= Hitmixes =

EP by Lady Gaga
- Released: August 25, 2009
- Genre: Dance-pop
- Length: 30:23
- Label: Streamline; KonLive; Cherrytree; Interscope
- Producer: Chew Fu; Guéna LG; Moto Blanco; RedOne; Martin Kierszenbaum; Space Cowboy

Lady Gaga chronology
The Cherrytree Sessions (2009)	Hitmixes (2009)	The Fame Monster (2009)

Hitmixes is the second extended play (EP) by American singer-songwriter Lady Gaga, released on August 25, 2009. Featuring remixes of songs from Gaga's debut album, The Fame (2008), the album was only released in Canada, by Universal Music Canada. Hitmixes features mixes from various musicians, including RedOne and Space Cowboy, who previously worked with Gaga. The EP hosts 1980s-influenced and house remixes. Hitmixes received positive reviews from the Calgary Herald and Blare Magazine, and peaked at number eight on the Canadian Albums Chart.

== Background and composition ==
Lady Gaga released her debut album, The Fame, on August 19, 2008; It spawned five singles: "Just Dance", "Poker Face", "Eh, Eh (Nothing Else I Can Say)", "LoveGame" and "Paparazzi". "Eh, Eh" was not released in North America, and was not remixed for Hitmixes. The other four singles all reached the top three of the Canadian Hot 100. The album's title track, "The Fame", was also remixed and included on the EP. Gaga's main producer, RedOne, produced a remix of "Just Dance" for the record; other producers were Robots to Mars, Chew Fu, Space Cowboy, Moto Blanco and Guéna LG. Hitmixes was released as a compact disc on August 25, 2009, in Canada only by Universal Music Canada. Moto Blanco's "Paparazzi" remix and the Glam as You remix of "The Fame" have 1980s influences, while the "LoveGame" Chew Fu Ghettohouse Fix and Space Cowboy's mix of "Poker Face" feature house styles, including incorporation of trance music and synthesizers. Rock singer Marilyn Manson and rapper Kardinal Offishall contribute additional vocals to the EP as featured artists.

== Reception ==
Due to its Canada-only release, Hitmixes did not receive many professional reviews. The Calgary Herald stated that several tracks were "artfully and decadently remixed". Dan Rankin of Blare Magazine gave the EP three-and-a-half stars out of five, saying that the mixes showed "varying degrees of success". Rankin especially praised Kardinal Offishall's vocals on the RedOne remix of "Just Dance" and singled it and the "LoveGame" Chew Fu Ghettohouse Fix as the best tracks on the album. Hitmixes debuted and peaked on the Canadian Albums Chart at number eight, on the issue dated September 12, 2009. The next week it fell to number sixteen, and spent its third and final week on the chart at number twenty-two.

== Track listing ==
Hitmixes track listing
No.	Title	Writer(s)	Remixer(s)	Length
1.	"LoveGame" (Chew Fu Ghettohouse fix; featuring Marilyn Manson)	Lady Gaga; RedOne	Chew Fu	5:20
2.	"Poker Face" (Space Cowboy remix)	Gaga; RedOne	Space Cowboy	4:53
3.	"Just Dance" (RedOne remix; featuring Kardinal Offishall)	Gaga; RedOne; Aliaune "Akon" Thiam	RedOne	4:18
4.	"Paparazzi" (Moto Blanco edit – radio version)	Gaga; Rob Fusari	Moto Blanco	4:06
5.	"The Fame" (Glam as You remix – radio edit version)	Gaga; Martin Kierszenbaum	Guéna LG	3:57
6.	"Just Dance" (Robots to Mars remix)	Gaga; RedOne; Thiam	Kierszenbaum	4:37
7.	"LoveGame" (Robots to Mars remix)	Gaga; RedOne	Kierszenbaum	3:12
Total length:				30:23

== Personnel ==
Credits for Hitmixes adapted from AllMusic.

- Akon – writing
- Jon Cohen – keyboards
- Rob Fusari – writing
- D. Harrison – programming, production, remixing
- Vincent Herbert – executive producer, artists and repertoire
- Martin Kierszenbaum – writing, remixing, artists and repertoire
- Lady Gaga – writing
- Moto Blanco – programming, producer, remixing
- Robert Orton – mixing
- Simon Paul – design
- RedOne – writing
- A. Smith – programming, producer, remixing
- Tony Ugval – engineering

== Charts ==
Chart performance for Hitmixes
Chart (2009)	Peak position
Canadian Albums (Billboard)	8
