= Make Her Say =

Single by Kid Cudi featuring Kanye West and Common

from the album Man on the Moon: The End of Day
- Released: June 9, 2009
- Recorded: 2009
- Studio: Avex Honolulu Studios (Honolulu, Hawaii)
- Genre: Dirty rap
- Length: 3:36 (album version); 3:57 (single version); 3:17 (video version)
- Label: Dream On; GOOD Music; Universal Motown
- Songwriters: Scott Mescudi; Kanye West; Lonnie Lynn; Stefani Germanotta; Nadir Khayat
- Producer: Kanye West

Kid Cudi singles chronology
"Welcome to the World" (2009)	"Make Her Say" (2009)	"Pursuit of Happiness" (2009)

Kanye West singles chronology
"Maybach Music 2" (2009)	"Make Her Say" (2009)	"Digital Girl" (2009)

Common singles chronology
"Announcement" (2008)	"Make Her Say" (2009)	"Ghetto Dreams" (2011)

Music video
- "Make Her Say" on YouTube

"Make Her Say" (originally "I Poke Her Face") is a song by American hip hop recording artist Kid Cudi, released as the second single from his debut album Man on the Moon: The End of Day (2009). The single was digitally released to iTunes on June 9, 2009. It features fellow American rappers Common and Kanye West, the latter of whom also produced the song. The song is perhaps best known for its sample of the US number-one hit single "Poker Face", as performed by American singer Lady Gaga. The song received a nomination for Best Rap Performance by a Duo or Group at the 52nd Annual Grammy Awards.

== Background and lyrical content ==
"Make Her Say" is performed by Kid Cudi, Kanye West, and Common. It was originally titled "I Poke Her Face", but was changed to make it more acceptable for radio. The song was written by all three artists, produced by West, and features scratches from DJ A-Trak. Lady Gaga (of whom West is a fan) and producer RedOne are credited as co-writers, because an acoustic version of Gaga's song "Poker Face" from The Cherrytree Sessions EP is sampled throughout the song. Gaga voiced approval of the track, saying that West "had so much insight into what the song was about." Incidentally, just a few weeks later, the two revealed plans to tour together; however, the tour was later canceled. In addition to the Lady Gaga sample, the song also makes musical references to T.I.'s "Whatever You Like", Asher Roth's "I Love College", C-Murder's "Down for My N's", and Jamie Foxx's "Blame It".

== Music video ==
The music video for "Make Her Say" was directed by Nez Khammal and released on July 20, 2009. The video carries a minimal aesthetic, with scenes taking place in empty, wide-open spaces. Although Kid Cudi, Kanye West, and Common all appear in the video, they never attended a film shoot together. The music video utilizes a split screen effect to create the illusion that the three artists were all filmed in the same location. In reality, they had shot their individual scenes on opposite coasts of the United States; Common and Kid Cudi were filmed in New York City while Kanye was filmed in Los Angeles. The group had wanted Lady Gaga to be included in the video, but she was too busy to make the appearance. The video uses a shortened version of the song that cuts out the outro.

The "Make Her Say" video is also the first music video to feature the hardware from Activision's DJ Hero.

== Live performances ==
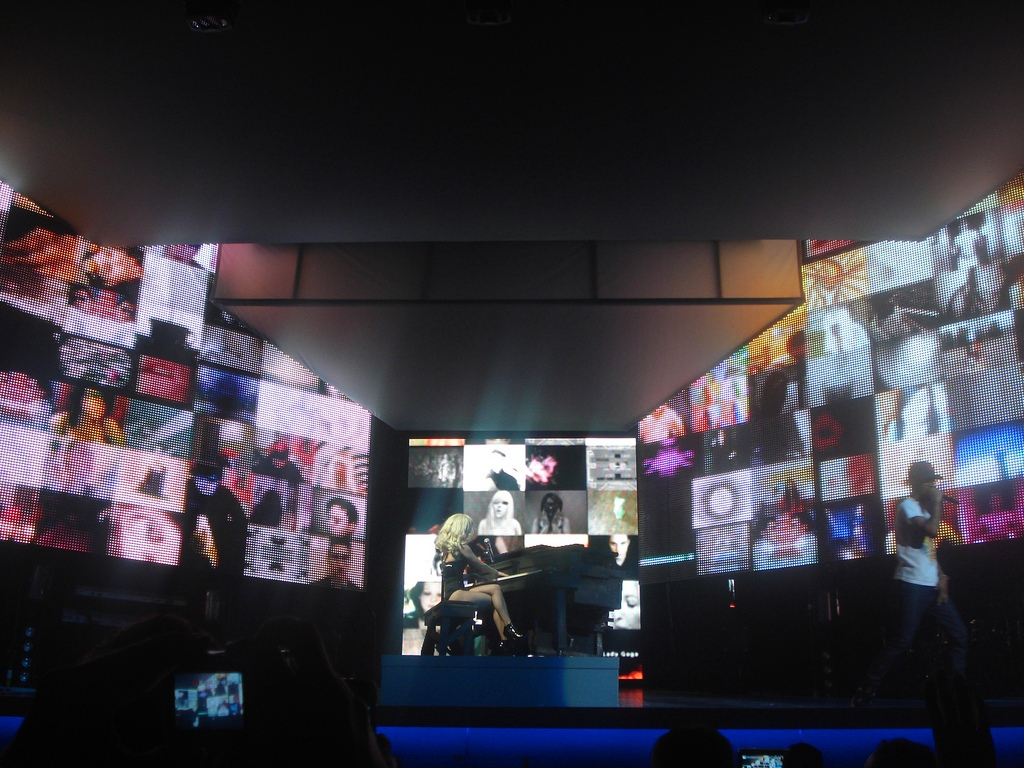
Lady Gaga and Kid Cudi performing the piano version of "Poker Face" and "Make Her Say" on The Monster Ball Tour

Kid Cudi performed the song solo during his set at the 2009 Bamboozle music festival. Kid Cudi also performed the song on June 13 in Chicago at The B96 Pepsi Summer Bash and in London at the 2009 O2 Wireless Festival. He also performed his verse of the song at Lollapalooza 2009 in Chicago, IL. He performed the song with Lady Gaga on her Monster Ball tour in Toronto, Ontario, Canada.

== Track listing ==
Man on the Moon CD: The End of Day

1. "Make Her Say" – 3:36

Digital single

1. "Make Her Say" – 3:57

Promotional CD single

1. "Make Her Say" (Clean) – 3:58
2. "Make Her Say" (Dirty) – 3:58
3. "Make Her Say" (Instrumental) – 3:57

Promotional CD single 2nd Version

1. "Make Her Say" – 3:58
2. "Make Her Say" (Instrumental) – 3:57
3. "Make Her Say" (Afrojack Remix) – 4:20
4. "Make Her Say" (Nadastrom 88 Dub) – 6:10

U.S. CD single

1. "Make Her Say" – 3:59
2. "Day 'N' Night" – 3:42
3. "Day 'N' Night" (Crookers Remix) – 4:41

== Chart performance ==
In the United States, "Make Her Say" debuted at number fifty-one on the Billboard Hot 100 on June 18, 2009. That same week, it also entered the Canadian Hot 100 at number seventy-eight. The song entered the Bubbling Under R&B/Hip-Hop Singles chart at number six for the issue date of July 4. The following week, it appeared on the Hot R&B/Hip-Hop Songs chart at number seventy-three.

== Charts ==
Chart (2009)	Peak position
Australia (ARIA)	62
Australia Urban (ARIA)	27
Belgium (Ultratip Bubbling Under Flanders)	18
Belgium (Ultratip Bubbling Under Wallonia)	7
Canada Hot 100 (Billboard)	78
Germany (GfK)	85
Israel (Media Forest)	10
New Zealand (Recorded Music NZ)	35
UK Singles (OCC)	67
UK Hip Hop/R&B (OCC)	24
US Billboard Hot 100	43
US Hot R&B/Hip-Hop Songs (Billboard)	39
US Hot Rap Songs (Billboard)	11
US Pop Airplay (Billboard)	39

== Certifications ==
Region	Certification	Certified units/sales
United States (RIAA)	Platinum	1,000,000^{‡}
^{‡} Sales+streaming figures based on certification alone.
