= The Fame Ball Tour =

2009 concert tour by Lady Gaga

- World tour by Lady Gaga
- Promotional poster
- Location: Asia; Europe; North America; Oceania
- Associated album: The Fame
- Start date: March 12, 2009
- End date: September 29, 2009
- Legs: 10
- No. of shows: 74
- Box office: $3.15 million ($4.73 in 2025 dollars)

Lady Gaga concert chronology
- The Fame Ball Tour (2009); Fame Kills: Starring Kanye West and Lady Gaga (2009–10; canceled)

The Fame Ball Tour was the debut concert tour by American singer Lady Gaga, in support of her debut studio album The Fame (2008). North American shows began in March, followed by dates in Oceania and a solo trek through Europe. Dates in Asia soon followed, as well as a performance at England's V Festival and two shows in North America that had been postponed from April. Gaga described the tour as a traveling museum show incorporating artist Andy Warhol's pop-performance art concept. Tickets were distributed for charity also. Alternate versions of the show with minimal variations were planned by Gaga to accommodate different venues.

The show consisted of four segments, with each segment being followed by a video interlude to the next segment, and it ended with an encore. The set list consisted of songs from her debut album, as well as an unreleased track called "Future Love". Gaga's performance involved multiple costume changes, and included an innovative dress made entirely of plastic bubbles. An alternate set list with minor changes were performed after the first North American leg of the tour. The show has received critical acclaim with critics complimenting her vocal clarity and fashion sense as well as her ability to pull off theatrics like a professional artist.

== Background ==
The tour was officially announced on January 12, 2009, through Gaga's official Myspace page. It was her first headlining tour; she has previously served as opening act for New Kids on the Block's New Kids on the Block: Live tour, as well as The Pussycat Dolls' Doll Domination Tour. Gaga stated, "I consider what I do to be more of an Andy Warhol concept: pop performance art, multimedia, fashion, technology, video, film. And it's all coming together, and it's going to be traveling museum show." Gaga started planning for the show while on the tour with The Pussycat Dolls. In an interview with MTV News, she described the concert series:

"It's not really a tour, it's more of a traveling party. I want it to be an entire experience from [the] minute you walk in [the] front door to [the] minute I begin to sing. And when it's all over, everyone's going to press rewind and relive it again. [...] It's going to be as if you're walking into New York circa 1974: There's an art installation in the lobby, a DJ spinning your favorite records in the main room, and then the most haunting performance that you've ever seen on the stage. [...] I'm on the phone every minute of every day, talking to people, being creative, planning this Ball, and my tour manager is constantly saying, 'Come on, we have to go, we've got to go right now,' [...] But to me, the Ball is so important. I want so much to make every depression dollar that everyone spends on my show worth it. And, yeah, I'm paying a lot for it — out of my own pocket. But that's OK. I just don't care about money."

Gaga prepared three versions of her show to cater to different sizes of the venues she played. In an interview with Billboard she said,

"I am so mental and sleepless and excited for this tour, [...] This is so different than anything you've seen from me in the past year. What's fantastic about [the show] was I was able to plan it while I was on another tour that was on a much smaller scale, opening for the Dolls. This is going to be, like, the ultimate creative orgasm for me 'cause I'm ready to move on. I'm not restricted to a certain structure for my show anymore. No limitations. I'm free. [...] I want to have a clear schedule of the dimensions for each venue so that we can properly execute all the technology and visuals. I need to mentally prepare days in advance if things are going to be taken out; otherwise, I won't have a good show...Every show's gonna be an A show by the time I'm done screaming at everyone – 'Hang it! Hang everything! Find a place to hang it!' That's gonna be my motto."

The set list consisted of songs from her debut album mainly, but some new songs like "Fashion" from the Confessions of a Shopaholic soundtrack were also considered. In May, during an interview with Edmonton Sun, Gaga announced that the tour would continue through European festivals in summer. She also declared plans for a bigger North American tour including Canada. Gaga explained that the show is supposed to be much bigger than the previous version. She said, "Oh, you have no idea, [...] The tour that we're about to announce is such a dream that I have to pinch myself almost every day to remind myself that it's happening."

== Concert synopsis ==
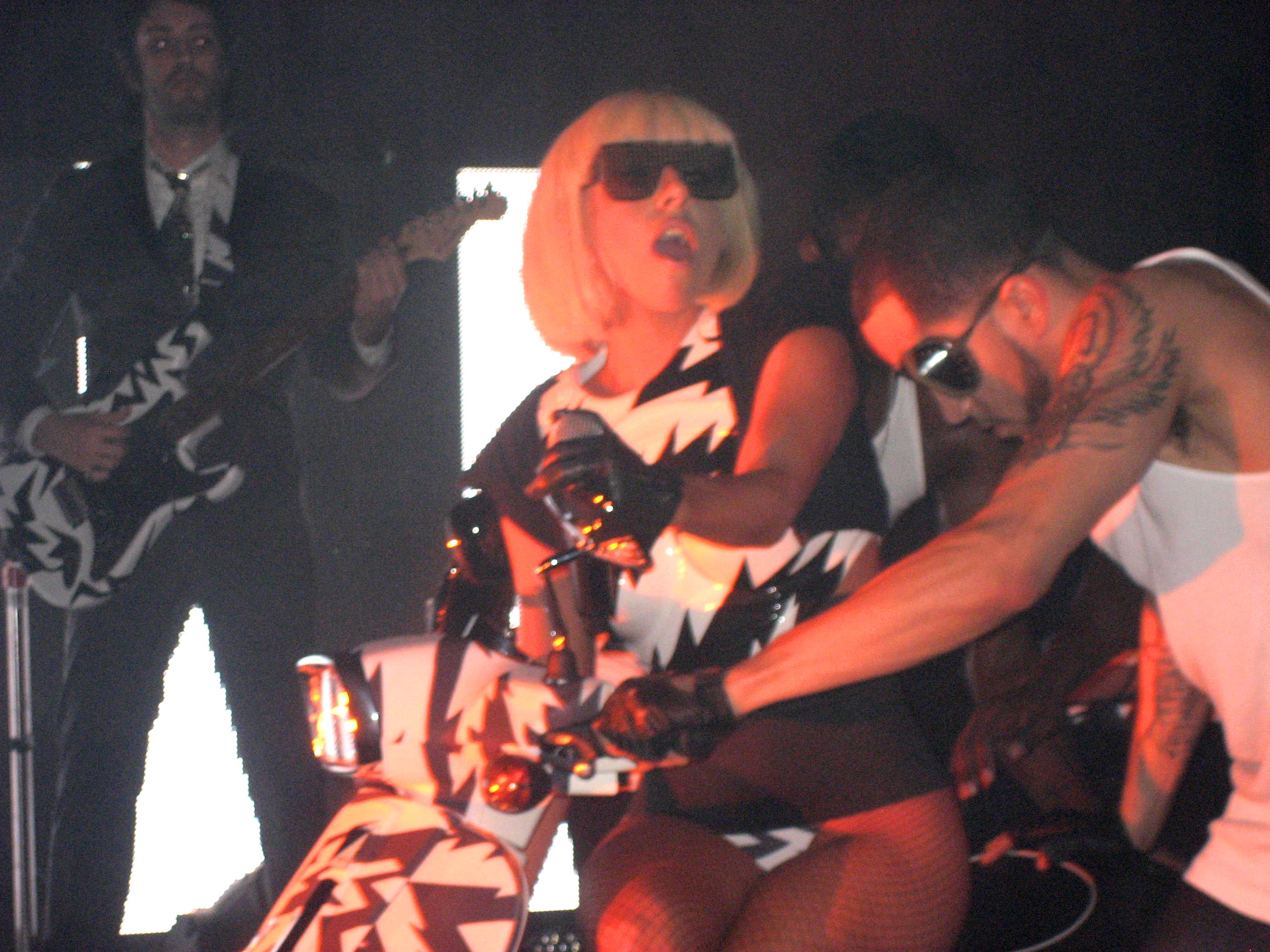
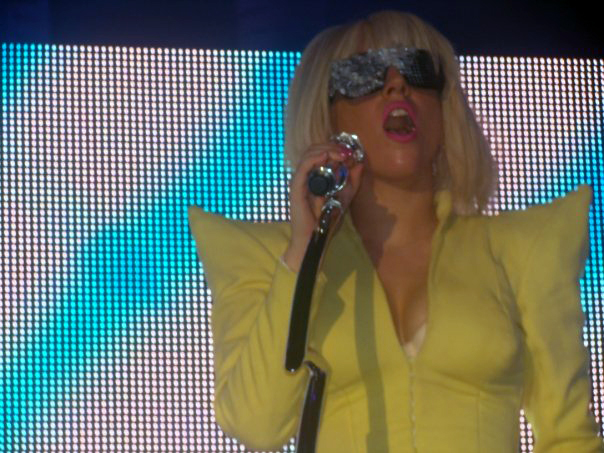
Lady Gaga riding a vespa while performing "Eh, Eh (Nothing Else I Can Say)" (left), and wearing a yellow dress for "Just Dance" (right)

The show is mainly divided into four parts with the last part being the encore. The main show began with a video introduction called "The Heart" where Gaga appeared as alter-ego Candy Warhol. She was shown dressing up and displayed the symbol of a pink heart on her T-shirt and said "My name is Lady Gaga, and this is my house." The video was projected on a giant screen in front of the stage. As the video approached towards the end, a countdown from ten to one happened, Gaga's face was shown wearing the video sunglasses, and flames engulfed the screen as it dropped. Gaga appeared in the middle of the stage being surrounded by her dancers holding glass encrusted plates which camouflage them. She wore a futuristic black dress in geometric patterns with a triangular piece on her right breast and peplum. DJ Space Cowboy was present at a corner, playing the backing music. Gaga came out in the center as the plates rolled around and started singing "Paparazzi".

The performance ends with continuous clicking of the camera. Gaga comes to the top of the pillar and sings a combination of "Starstruck" and "LoveGame" as she is joined by her dancers in tracks and jackets and hands Gaga her trademark disco stick. After "LoveGame", she talks a monologue about the year "3009". And says that "The kids came out of New York and shot the paparazzi." followed by saying "It was a thousand years before when the monster first entered the city, vanished for our hearts and for our brains and for our faces (referencing to the three video interludes of the tour)" and "we knew we could co-exist with this monster with our MUSIC!!! With our art and with our fashion. My name is Lady Gaga." and tells the crowd she feels "beautiful and dirty rich" and sang "Beautiful, Dirty, Rich". This leads to the end of the first part wherein a video introduction called "The Brain" starts with Gaga appearing again as Candy Warhol and brushing her hair. After the video ends, Gaga appears on the stage in a black and white leotard with high-pointed "puff" shoulders and lightning shaped symbols, while riding on a similarly colored vespa. She then starts singing "The Fame". This is followed by a speech. Gaga said she's been "travelling the whole world, but when I get back, I can still smell the stench of greed." And then she performs "Money Honey" with the dancers who are wearing backpacks. "Eh, Eh (Nothing Else I Can Say)" starts immediately, accompanied by hand-waving and Gaga wore a hat made of toppled dominoes.

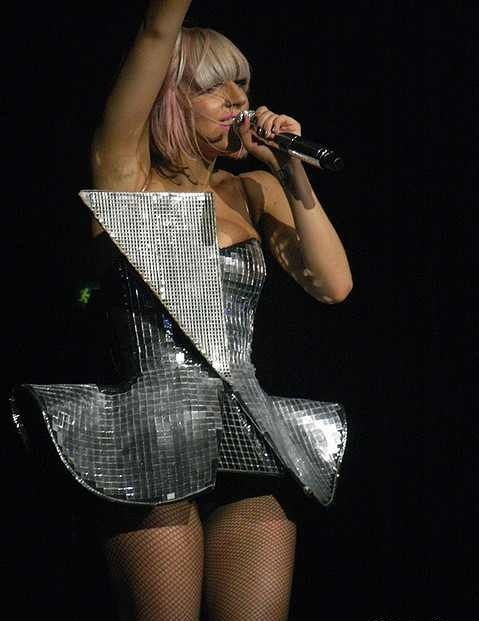
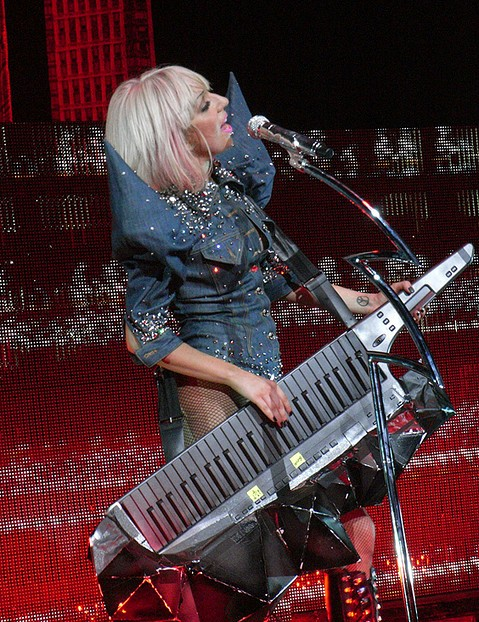
Lady Gaga performing "Beautiful, Dirty, Rich" in a tinfoil tutu (left), and playing on a keytar during "Money Honey" (right) in a London show

Gaga then leaves the stage only to appear shortly after in a dress completely made of plastic bubbles. She sits in front of a glass piano and starts singing an acoustic version of "Poker Face". She sometimes puts her leg on the piano and even plays it with her stilettos. And then, thanks the audience and surprises them by performing an unreleased and new song called "Future Love" whose lyrics referenced far-off galaxies, mechanical hearts and constellations. She was surrounded by a glowing mannequin while singing the song. The stage had a blue setting with mechanical fog. Gaga left for a costume change as the third video interlude titled The Face starts.

After the video ended, she then came on the stage wearing a tutu shaped dress with pointed shoulder pads and peplum. Her dancers were clad in Louis Vuitton Steven Sprouse printed trousers which matched Gaga's shoes. The backdrop changed to show blinking disco lights and Gaga stood in the center wearing her video sunglasses which display the line "Pop Music Will Never Be Low Brow". A remix of the intro for "Just Dance" started and Gaga was joined by her dancers on stage. When the song shifts to the bridge, Gaga once again is handed her disco stick and performs the bridge with it. The ending shifts to a remixed version of the song. Then Gaga and the dancers, joined by DJ Space Cowboy or DJ Nicodemus, take a bow in front of the audience. Gaga comes back with her dancers to perform the encore. The encore of the tour consisted of "Boys, Boys, Boys" and the original version of "Poker Face". Gaga was dressed in a khaki leotard embellished with crystals. She wore an admiral's cap and gloves on her hands, both were decorated with the word Gaga on them.

== Critical response ==
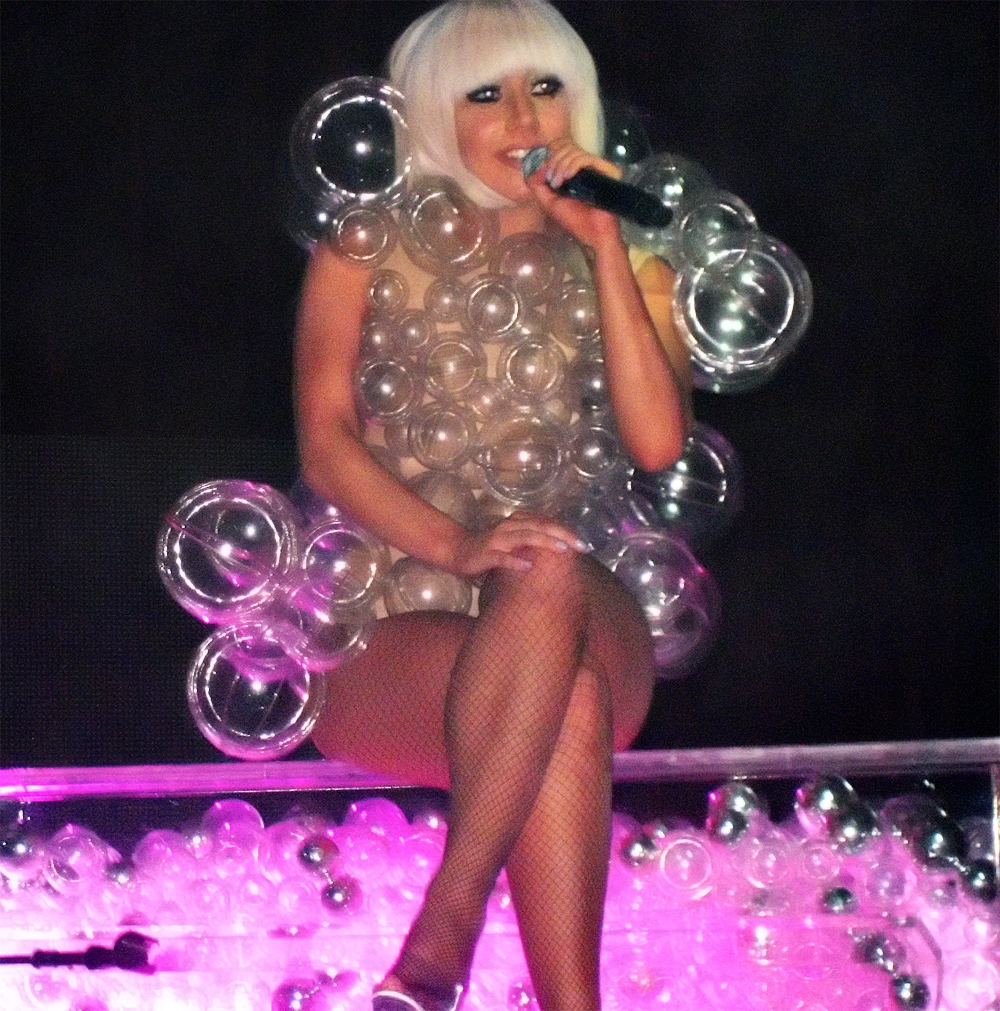
Gaga speaking to the audience while wearing a dress made of plastic bubbles

Sheri Linden from Yahoo! gave a positive review of the concert saying "Gaga's first theater tour is a hot ticket – and the Lady did not disappoint. Borrowing from Madonna, Grace Jones, David Bowie and Daryl Hannah's Blade Runner replicant, Gaga put on a compelling show revolving around her mysterious persona, a trio of leather-jacketed dancers, multiple costume changes and props and a lone DJ providing musical accompaniment." Christopher Muther from The Boston Globe reviewed the concert in House of Blues and said "The combination of song and spectacle was crowd-pleasing and exhilarating. Her club-ready songs were delivered by a woman who is clearly studied, intelligent, and talented." Lynn Saxberg from the Ottawa Citizen was also positive in her review, which she wrote after the concert at Bronson Centre in Ottawa and said, "Accompanied by a DJ who also played a funky electric guitar, the curvy dynamo (Gaga and Space Cowboy) fronted one of wildest spectacles ever mounted at Bronson Centre, an action-packed circus of sound, lights, video images, fog and choreography. Though heavy on theatrics, there was no skimping on the music." She also commented on Gaga's fashion sense and style in her costumes by saying, "In an hour, Gaga proved her star power by packing in all her hits, displaying influences that ranged from Motown to 80s pop, and exhibiting a fearless fashion sense in several costume changes, none of which covered her bum." Whitney Pastorek of Entertainment Weekly gave a mixed review of the concert, saying, "Her onstage banter was at times a bit silly and the visuals occasionally lacking in coherent theme, but her voice was strong and refreshingly free of overbearing tracking vocals. For all her cocky bluster, perhaps the most undeniable aspect of Gaga's talent is this: The girl can, and does, sing." The show was described to be a "sartorial experimentation that it made Rocky Horror look like cotillion. One presumed the Lady approved – and somewhere, to be sure, Andy Warhol stirred in his grave."

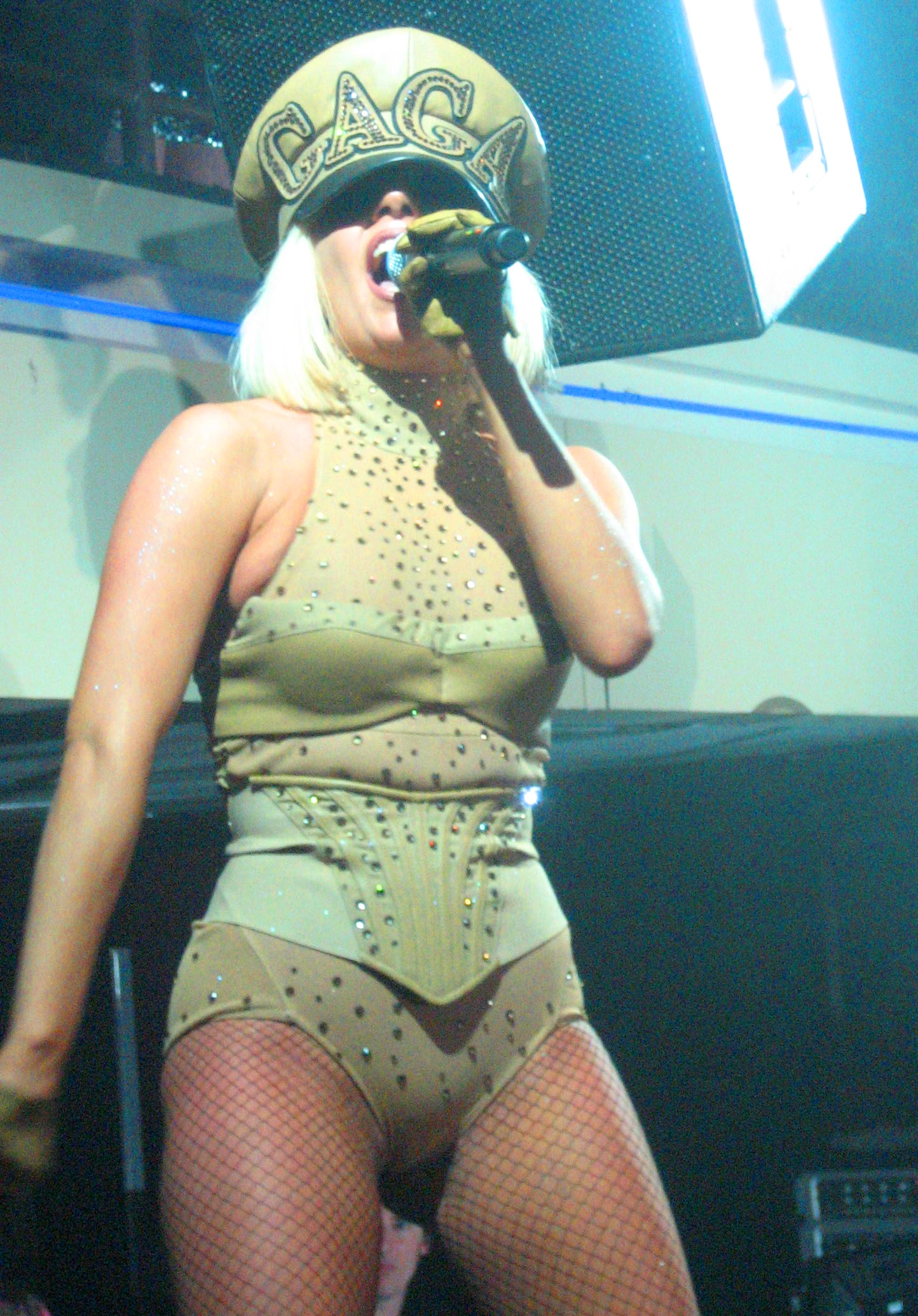
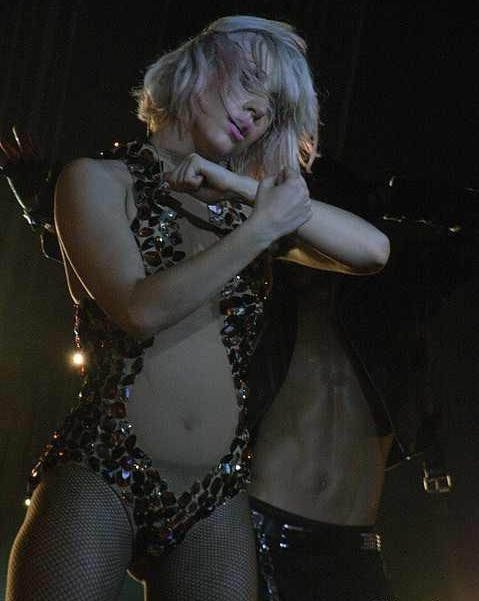
During the first North American leg, Gaga performed "Poker Face" in a khaki leotard and an admiral's cap (left), while during later shows, she performed it in a nude colored leotard (right).

Andy Downing from Chicago Tribune was impressed by the show at House of Blues and said "The work is paying off. Just weeks into her first nationwide headlining tour, the 22-year-old New Yorker [...] already commands the stage like a seasoned pro." Jill Menze from Billboard also gave a positive review for the performance and complimented songs like "Just Dance", "LoveGame", "Poker Face", "Boys Boys Boys" and the fame obsessed "Paparazzi". The reviewer also said that "[From] her chart success, Lady Gaga has proven herself to be an of-the-moment pop sensation. Dig deeper, and it's clear she's versatile and talented enough to have staying power." Mikel Wood from Rolling Stone also gave a positive review saying "The tongue-in-cheek tabloid-victim shtick that provides some laughs on The Fame grew somewhat tiresome at the Wiltern, especially when the singer started spewing half-baked media-studies nonsense like, 'Some say Lady Gaga is a lie'... Fortunately, this is a woman who knows how to lighten a mood: Within 10 minutes or so, she'd donned a flesh-colored leotard and a bedazzled admiral's cap and was rhyming 'boys in cars' with 'buy us drinks in bars'." Craig Rosen from The Hollywood Reporter said that "Lady Gaga showed she's a serious contender to Madonna's crown [...]. She might be a relative newcomer, but the artist born Stefani Joanne Germanotta commanded the stage with a royal air during her hourlong set, at times even sporting a glowing scepter."

== Opening acts ==
- The White Tie Affair (North America)
- Chester French (North America)
- Cinema Bizarre (North America)
- Gary Go (Great Britain)

== Set list ==
=== Original ===
This was the general setlist used from March 12 to June 19, 2009. It is not intended to represent every concert from this period.

1. "Paparazzi"
2. "LoveGame" (contains elements of "Starstruck")
3. "Beautiful, Dirty, Rich"
4. "The Fame"
5. "Money Honey"
6. "Eh, Eh (Nothing Else I Can Say)"
7. "Poker Face" (piano version)
8. "Future Love"
9. "Just Dance"
10. "Boys Boys Boys"
11. "Poker Face"

=== Revamped ===
This was the general setlist used from June 29 to September 29, 2009. It is not intended to represent every concert from this period.

1. "Paparazzi"
2. "LoveGame" (contains elements of the Chew Fu Ghettohouse Fix)
3. "Beautiful, Dirty, Rich"
4. "The Fame"
5. "Money Honey"
6. "Boys Boys Boys"
7. "Just Dance"
8. "Eh, Eh (Nothing Else I Can Say)"
9. "Brown Eyes"
10. "Poker Face" (piano version)
11. "Poker Face" (contains elements of the Space Cowboy Remix)

=== Notes ===
- On March 13, 2009, during the performance at the Wiltern Theatre, Gaga was presented with a plaque from the Recording Industry Association of America by social blogger Perez Hilton commemorating three million sales of her debut single "Just Dance".

== Tour dates ==
Date (2009)	City	Country	Venue
North America
March 12	San Diego	United States	House of Blues
March 13 (Note: This concert was originally scheduled to take place in Avalon.)	Los Angeles	United States	Wiltern Theatre
March 14	San Francisco	United States	Mezzanine; Two shows
March 16	Seattle	United States	Showbox at the Market
March 17	Portland	United States	Wonder Ballroom
March 18	Vancouver	Canada	Commodore Ballroom
March 21	Englewood	United States	Gothic Theatre
March 23	Minneapolis	United States	Fine Line Music Cafe
March 24	Chicago	United States	House of Blues; Two shows
March 25 (Note: This concert was originally scheduled to take place in Crofoot Ballroom.)	Royal Oak	United States	Royal Oak Music Theatre
March 26	Kitchener	Canada	Elements Nightclub
March 27	Ottawa	Canada	Bronson Centre Theatre
March 28	Montreal	Canada	Métropolis
March 30	Boston	United States	House of Blues
April 4 (Note: This concert was a part of the "Dinah Shore Weekend")	Palm Springs	United States	Oasis Hall
April 6	Orlando	United States	House of Blues
April 7	Tampa	United States	The Ritz Ybor
April 8	Fort Lauderdale	United States	Revolution Live
April 9	Atlanta	United States	Center Stage Theater
April 11 (Note: This concert was a part of the "White Party")	Palm Springs	United States	Oasis Hall
Europe
April 24	Madrid	Spain	La Cubierta
April 25	Moscow	Russia	Famous
April 28 (Note: This concert was a part of the "SWR3 Party")	Stuttgart	Germany	Club Zapata
North America
May 1	Philadelphia	United States	Electric Factory
May 2	New York City	United States	Terminal 5 Two shows
May 3 (Note: This concert was a part of Kiss 95.7's "Summer Kick Off")	Agawam	United States	Northern Star Arena
May 4 (Note: This concert was a part of the "Grammy Celebration Concert Tour")	Boston	United States	House of Blues
May 6 (Note: This concert was a part of the "Second Chance Prom")	Austin	United States	Austin Music Hall
May 8 (Note: This concert was a part of Channel 933's "Summer Kick Off")	Chula Vista	United States	Cricket Wireless Amphitheatre
May 9 (Note: This concert was a part of "Wango Tango")	Irvine	United States	Verizon Wireless Amphitheatre
May 10 (Note: This concert was a part of 107.9 The End's "EndFest 2009")	West Sacramento	United States	Raley Field
Oceania
May 25 (Note: This concert was a part of Kia Soul Live at The Chapel.)	Sydney	Australia	Paddington Uniting Church
Asia
June 8	Tokyo	Japan	Shibuya-AX
June 14	Clarke Quay	Singapore	The Dome on Merchant Loop
June 17	Seoul	South Korea	Club Answer
North America
June 19	Toronto	Canada	Kool Haus
Europe
June 26 (Note: This concert was a part of the "2009 Glastonbury Festival")	Pilton	England	Worthy Farm
June 29	Manchester	England	Manchester Academy
July 1 (Note: This concert was a part of "Live at the Marquee")	Cork	Ireland	The Marquee
July 3 (Note: This concert was a part of "Rock Werchter")	Werchter	Belgium	Werchter Festival Grounds
July 8 (Note: This concert was a part of "Isle of MTV")	Floriana	Malta	Fuq il-Fosos
July 9	Paris	France	L'Olympia
July 11 (Note: This concert was a part of "T in the Park")	Perth and Kinross	Scotland	Balado
July 12 (Note: This concert was a part of "Oxegen")	Naas	Ireland	Punchestown Racecourse
July 13 (Note: This concert was a part of "Orange Rockcorps Live Concert Event")	Manchester	England	Carling Apollo Manchester
July 14	London	England	O_{2} Academy Brixton
July 16	Munich	Germany	Zenith die Kulturhalle
July 17	Cologne	Germany	Palladium
July 18	Berlin	Germany	Columbiahalle
July 20	Amsterdam	Netherlands	Melkweg
July 21	Zürich	Switzerland	Maag Event Hall
July 22	Vienna	Austria	Gasometer Halle
July 24	Ibiza	Spain	Eden
July 25	Amsterdam	Netherlands	Paradiso
July 26	Hamburg	Germany	Stadtpark Freilichtbühne
July 28	Helsinki	Finland	Kulttuuritalo
July 30	Oslo	Norway	Sentrum Scene
July 31	Copenhagen	Denmark	K.B. Hallen
August 1 (Note: This concert was a part of "Storsjöyran")	Östersund	Sweden	Storsjöyran Festligterräng
August 2	Stockholm	Sweden	Stora Scen
Asia
August 7 (Note: These concerts were a part of the "Summer Sonic Festival")	Osaka	Japan	Maishima Sports Island
August 8	Chiba	Japan	Makuhari Messe
August 9	Seoul	South Korea	Olympic Hall
August 11	Quezon City	Philippines	Araneta Coliseum
August 12	Singapore		Fort Canning Park
August 15	Macau		Venetian Arena
August 19 (Note: This concert was a part of "Non-Stop Musix")	Tel Aviv	Israel	Expo Tel Aviv
Europe
August 23 (Note: This show was a part of "V Festival")	Chelmsford	England	Hylands Park
North America
September 28 (Note: This concert was originally scheduled to take place on April 3, 2009, in National Theater, but was moved to Landmark Theater and then cancelled.)	Richmond	United States	Landmark Theater
September 29	Washington, D.C.	United States	DAR Constitution Hall

== Box office score data ==
Venue	City	Attendance	Revenue
House of Blues	San Diego	1,000 / 1,000	$18,500
Wiltern Theatre	Los Angeles	2,700 / 2,700	$52,904
Gothic Theater	Englewood	1,088 / 1,088	$20,000
Royal Oak Music Theatre	Royal Oak	1,700 / 1,700	$34,000
Métropolis	Montreal	2,255 / 2,255	$50,387
The Ritz Ybor	Tampa	1,560 / 1,560	$31,065
DAR Constitution Hall	Washington, D.C.	3,500 / 3,500	$141,004
Total		13,803 / 13,803 (100%)	$347,860
