= Eh, Eh (Nothing Else I Can Say) =

2009 single by Lady Gaga

- Remixes EP cover art is similar, but it features two pink stripes.

Single by Lady Gaga

from the album The Fame
- Released: January 10, 2009
- Recorded: 2007–2008
- Studio: Cherrytree (Santa Monica, California)
- Genre: Synth-pop; bubblegum pop
- Length: 2:57
- Label: Streamline; KonLive; Cherrytree; Interscope
- Songwriters: Lady Gaga; Martin Kierszenbaum
- Producer: Martin Kierszenbaum

Lady Gaga singles chronology
"Poker Face" (2008)	"Eh, Eh (Nothing Else I Can Say)" (2009)	"LoveGame" (2009)

Music video
- "Eh, Eh (Nothing Else I Can Say)" on YouTube

"Eh, Eh (Nothing Else I Can Say)" is a song by American singer Lady Gaga, from her debut studio album, The Fame (2008). The track was written by Gaga alongside Martin Kierszenbaum, who also produced the track. It was released as the third single from the album in Australia, New Zealand and selected European countries, and the fourth single in France, on January 10, 2009, through Kierszenbaum's Cherrytree Records, alongside Streamline Records, KonLive, and Interscope Records. The song is a calypso-styled, mid-tempo ballad, and is about breaking up with one's old partner and finding someone new.

The song peaked at number fifteen on the Australian ARIA Charts and at number nine on the RIANZ charts of New Zealand. It proved to be even more successful in Sweden, where it managed to peak at number two on the Sverigetopplistan chart, as well as in the Czech Republic, France, and Hungary, where it reached the top-ten of their respective charts. "Eh, Eh (Nothing Else I Can Say)" received Gold certifications for its sales in Australia, Denmark, New Zealand, and the United States.

The accompanying Italian-American 1950s-themed music video portrayed Gaga and her friends roaming around the streets of the Little Italy neighborhood of New York City, Gaga riding a Vespa and also singing the song while at home with her boyfriend. The video was noted for its contrasting portrayal of Gaga doing feminine work, as compared to her previous endeavours. She performed "Eh, Eh (Nothing Else I Can Say)" on her first headlining concert tour, The Fame Ball Tour, wearing a black-and-white leotard, and during the first legs of The Monster Ball Tour, while standing inside a giant gyroscope.

== Background and composition ==
"Eh, Eh" was written by Gaga with Martin Kierszenbaum, who also produced the track. It was recorded at Cherrytree Recording Studios in Santa Monica, California. In 2005, Kierszenbaum founded Cherrytree Records along with Jimmy Iovine, then chairman of Interscope Records. After signing a number of artists, he worked with then-unknown Gaga on her debut album, The Fame, producing and writing four songs with her, including the title track. One of these songs was "Eh, Eh (Nothing Else I Can Say)". During recording the track, Gaga fashioned a nickname for Kierszenbaum, called "Cherry Cherry Boom Boom". They kept the nickname in all the four songs they had worked on. Kierszenbaum later carried on the nickname in all his future projects. Other personnel working on the song included Tony Ugval, who did the audio engineering, Robert Orton for audio mixing and Gene Grimaldi, who mastered the song at Oasis Mastering Studios in Burbank, California.

"Eh, Eh (Nothing Else I Can Say)"
An 18-second sample of Gaga's "Eh, Eh (Nothing Else I Can Say)", containing the opening lyrics. The sample demonstrates the ballad-like composition of the song, in contrast to the more dance-y songs on The Fame, as well as the 1980s synth-pop and bubblegum pop background music.

"Eh, Eh (Nothing Else I Can Say)" is credited as a ballad compared to the rest of the dance-fuelled tracks from The Fame. It is a 1980s-influenced synth-pop and bubblegum pop song, while incorporating the "Eh, Eh" hook from Rihanna's single "Umbrella", according to Freedom du Lac from The Washington Post. According to the sheet music published at Musicnotes.com by Sony/ATV Music Publishing, the song is set in the time signature of common time with a moderate tempo of 94 beats per minute. Gaga's vocal range spans from B_{3} to C♯_{5} with the main key in which the song is set being E major. The song follows in the chord progression of E–B–F♯m–E–B–F♯m. Gaga stated that the lyrics of "Eh, Eh (Nothing Else I Can Say)" are about love and she explained that "'Eh, Eh' is my simple pop song about finding someone new and breaking up with the old boyfriend." Writer James E. Perone mentioned in his book The Album: A Guide to Pop Music's Most Provocative, Influential, and Important Creations that with the lyrics, Gaga maintained a focus on transitory relationships. Although the lyrics explain to her former lover that she has found someone new and does not mean to hurt him with the news, the continuous repetition of the phrase "nothing else I can say" solidifies the transient nature of the relationship portrayed.

== Critical reception ==
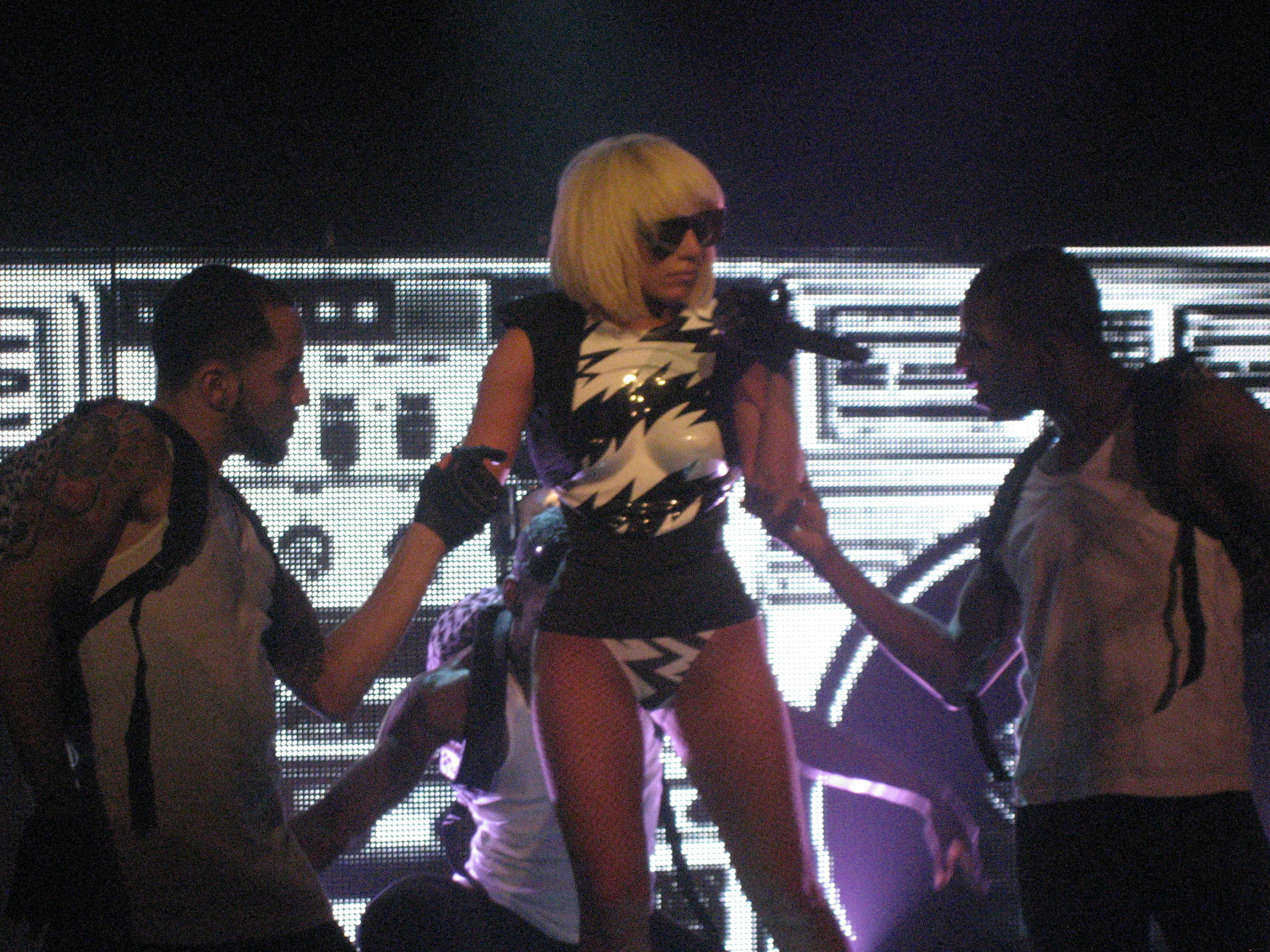
Gaga performing "Eh, Eh" at The Fame Ball Tour

Alexis Petridis from The Guardian noted that "Eh, Eh" bears the influence of early 1990s Europop and "is the first song in a long time that warrants comparison to the œuvre of Ace of Base. Matthew Chisling of AllMusic gave a negative review of the song saying "The Fame has it's [sic] 'ballad,' however the breezy 'Eh, Eh' doesn't hold water on this album; rather, it feels dry and lifeless, something which holds this album back". Sal Cinquemani of Slant Magazine said that "the breezy island vibe and soft demeanor of 'Eh, Eh (Nothing Else I Can Say)' is hard to buy when sandwiched between songs like 'Poker Face' and 'Beautiful, Dirty, Rich.'" In another article analyzing Gaga's music video releases, Oscar Moralde from Slant Magazine noted that "Eh, Eh" as a track "is an intriguing case: rather than the tech-assisted sexy-androgynous dance pop that dominates a good chunk of The Fame, it and its sister tracks 'Brown Eyes' and 'Again Again' are evidence of a stripped-down, simpler, sincere Gaga."

Evan Sawdey of PopMatters said that the song is the most embarrassing moment on The Fame, making the album come to an intermediate halt thus ruining the "bad-girl party atmosphere". Joey Guerra of the Houston Chronicle said that "Eh, Eh" is a bouncy standout with some vocal personality. He also added that "[It] would have made a killer Spice Girls single." Genevieve Koski of The A.V. Club called the track scaled-back and criticized Gaga's vocal abilities in the song. Jon Caramanica of The New York Times found the song listless. Catherine P. Lewis from The Washington Post called the song a chirpy ballad. Christina Martin from The Meridian Star felt that the song, along with "Summerboy" from The Fame, is breezy and upbeat in nature. Matt Busekroos from Quinnipiac Chronicle said that the song seemed like filler.

== Release and chart performance ==
"Eh, Eh (Nothing Else I Can Say)" was first released in New Zealand on January 10, 2009, and later in Australia on January 30, 2009. "Eh, Eh" was the second most added song on Australian radio on the week beginning December 15, 2008. It first began to receive airplay on all Today Network stations. The song was confirmed as an Australian single on Lady Gaga's official website on January 15, 2009. An official remix was also posted on her website that day followed by another one featuring the official cover art. On March 5, 2009, a Pet Shop Boys remix—named as "Random Soul Synthetic Mix"—became available for free download on Gaga's Australian website. Synth-pop musician Frankmusik remixed the track for Gaga's 2010 album, The Remix, where he manipulated Gaga's vocals and created a dreamy quality with them, as noted by Nicki Escuedo from Phoenix New Times.

"Eh, Eh (Nothing Else I Can Say)" debuted on the ARIA Singles Chart at number 38 on the issue of January 18, 2009. The following week it climbed to number 32 and ultimately peaked at number 15, on the issue of March 1, 2009, making it Gaga's third single to hit the top twenty there. "Eh, Eh" was later certified double platinum for sales of 140,000 equivalent units by the Australian Recording Industry Association (ARIA). In New Zealand, "Eh, Eh" debuted at number 40 on the issue dated January 19, 2009. The following weeks it continued its rise on the chart and ultimately peaked at number nine, spending three weeks there, and becoming her third consecutive top ten hit in New Zealand. The song was certified gold on May 24, 2009, by the Recording Industry Association of New Zealand (RIANZ), for shipment of 7,500 copies. The single debuted and reached a peak of number seven in France, and sold a total of 52,000 copies according to the SNEP, becoming Gaga's third top ten in the country after "Poker Face" who peaked atop earlier this year and "LoveGame" who reached number five earlier this year.

On the Billboard issue dated February 21, 2009, "Eh, Eh (Nothing Else I Can Say)" debuted on the Canadian Hot 100 chart at number 68, despite not being released as a single, but dropped off the chart the following week. It entered the chart again for two weeks in August 2010. Although "Eh, Eh (Nothing Else I Can Say)" was not released in the United States, it received a gold certification from the Recording Industry Association of America (RIAA) for selling over 500,000 equivalent units. The song also debuted at number 20 on the Swedish Singles Chart for the issue dated April 2, 2009, and peaked at number two. On the Digital Songs chart of Sweden, it peaked at the top in its fourth week. The song debuted on the Danish Singles Chart at number 28 on May 15, 2009, and peaked at number 14. Due to the moderate chart performance in the European markets, "Eh, Eh" only reached a peak of number 40 on Billboard's European Hot 100 Singles chart.

== Music video ==
=== Background and synopsis ===
Gaga as a housewife doing regular chores for her husband. Critic Oscar Moralde noted that the video "asserts the Lady Gaga of [her previous music videos] to be the real one, and the Gaga in 'Eh Eh' is a character that she is playing".

The Italian-American 1950s-inspired music video, directed by Joseph Kahn, was shot back to back with the video for the song "LoveGame" on the weekend of January 9–10, 2009, in Los Angeles. About the video, Gaga explained: "I wanted to show a different side of myself — perhaps a more domestic girly side. And I wanted to create beautiful, stunning '50s futuristic fashion imagery that would burn holes in everyone's brains." She further clarified that for the fashion aspects in the video she wanted to go in an opposite direction to her usual image. She wanted a yellow based wardrobe believing the color to become a big hit in the fashion world in 2009.

The video starts out showing Little Italy, an icon of the Madonna and Child, and then Gaga riding a Vespa. The first twenty seconds are mainly full of camera shots of different men, Gaga, and the city. The singer roams around with some friends, laughing and joking in a restaurant, while she stands on the seat. Gaga then comes from around the block walking with her friends in pace and singing in the camera. Next, she is shown sleeping in a bed, and waking up to reveal pink high-heeled shoes. She sings and cooks for a man in a house while dancing. She irons clothes while the man is on the phone screaming at someone. The two harlequin Great Danes who appear at the start of her "Poker Face" music video, also appear in this one. Finally she lies on a sofa with her legs up on the man. One of the last scenes shows her in a yellow dress made of flowers and wearing a yellow watch while singing to the song with a unique hairstyle which shows her hair pulled up and folded over. Then the camera quickly goes back to her in bed.

=== Reception ===
David Balls from Digital Spy noted Gaga's homage to her Italian-American roots in the video, but wondered if Gaga would "overexpose herself" with the video. Like his review of the single, Moralde found the video to be complementing the simplistic composition of the song. He believed that with the videos for previous singles, "Just Dance" and "Poker Face", Gaga's persona was established, but with the video for "Eh, Eh" she traversed her persona from the original Stefani Germanotta that she was born, to the character Lady Gaga. He explained: "What's striking about it is how much it feels like Lady Gaga is playacting: the video has a nostalgic, dreamlike tone. Set in a stylized pastel 1950s Little Italy, the video plays heavily with stereotypical and historical shorthand as it displays moustached chefs, macho men in wife beaters, cute Vespas, and spaghetti and meatballs." He noted that with all of these activities, Gaga created an essential fashion dollhouse, by playing feminine characters.

But Gaga addressed the viewer directly in the video while singing the song, which led Moralde to deduce that "She's not in the moment, but is instead playing a feminized role in a dreamlike space; this quality is accentuated by the bright and blown-out color palette, and the numerous shots of Gaga in bed or sleeping. The cumulative effect is that it asserts the Lady Gaga of the previous videos to be the real one, and the Gaga in 'Eh, Eh' is a character that she is playing." His view was shared by Chris Kingston from The Harvard Crimson who noted during the release of the music video for Gaga's 2010 single "Telephone", that the video shows "the crazy party girl we know [...] actually has a weirdly girlish, domestic side." In The Oxford Handbook of Sound and Image in Digital Media, author Carol Vernallis divided Gaga's persona into three categories. The personality portrayed in the "Eh, Eh" video was named as "Friendly Peer" archetype; someone with a girl-next-door image and approachable behavior.

== Live performances ==
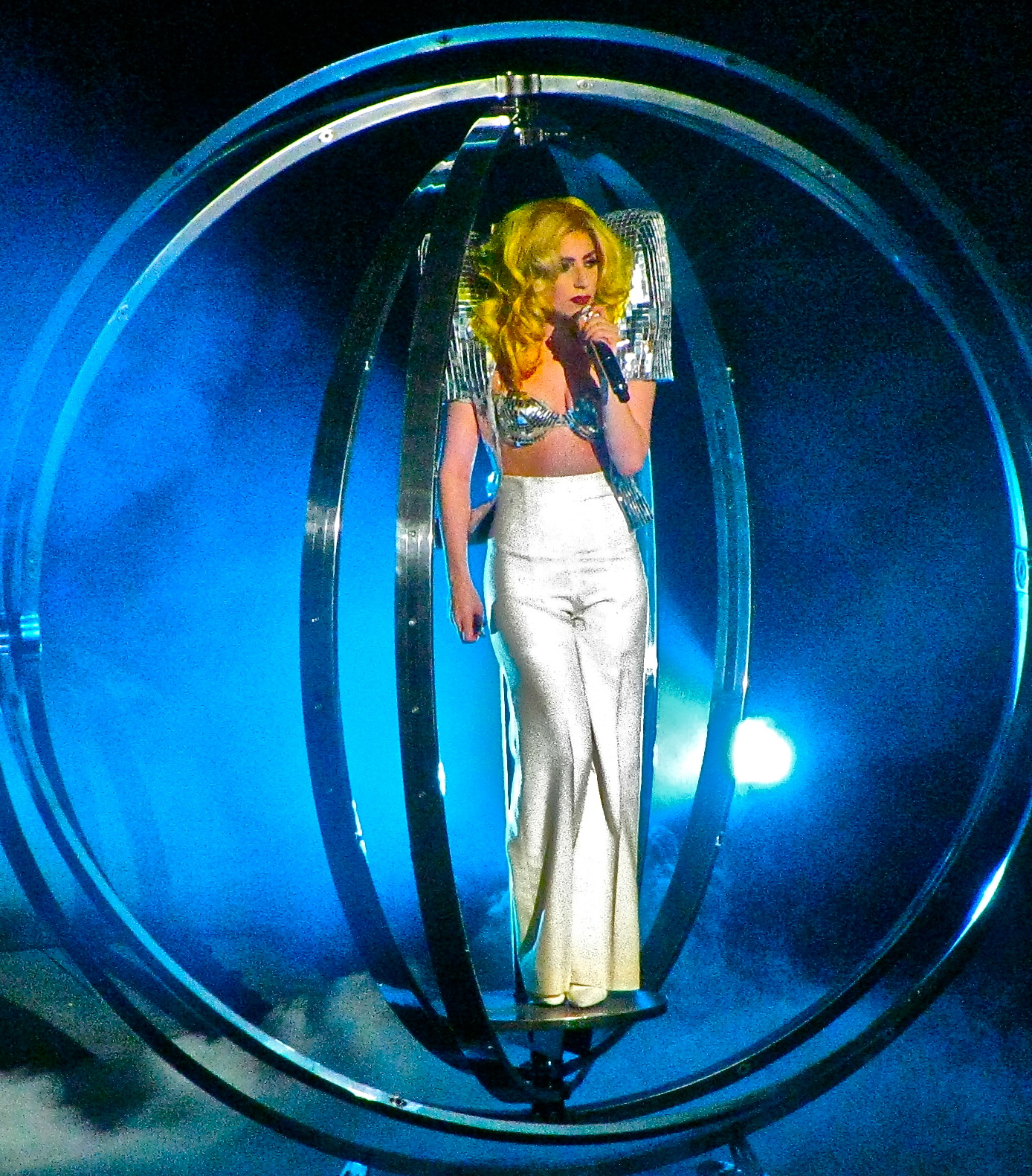
Gaga performing "Eh, Eh" on The Monster Ball Tour, in 2010

"Eh, Eh" was first performed in a beatbox version at the Cherrytree Studios and was released on Gaga's first EP, The Cherrytree Sessions. "Eh, Eh" was majorly performed at Gaga's The Fame Ball Tour in the second segment. Gaga was dressed in a white body plate leotard with black lightning shaped stripes and wore a hat made of toppled dominoes. As the performance of previous song "Money Honey" ended Gaga appeared on the stage beside Space Cowboy on a Vespa whence the music for "Eh, Eh" starts. The backdrops change to reveal lightning shapes in contrast to the sunny nature of the song. Gaga sang the song in its actual form backed by vocals from DJ Space Cowboy who spun the music from a corner of the stage. As the song reached the chorus Gaga asked the crowd to join her while singing and wave their arms. The New York Times called the live performance listless. However, The Hollywood Reporter said of the performance that, "In an age of too much information, one of the most refreshing things about Gaga is her mystery. She often hid behind shades, and her mostly incomprehensible, coy and semi-robotic stage patter did little to tell us who's that Lady."

Gaga also performed the song at the 2009 Glastonbury Festival. Although the show was part of The Fame Ball Tour, many elements were different from usual tour dates. For "Eh Eh", Gaga wore a pyrotechnic bra that fired sparkle-flames from her breast area while singing the chorus. In September 2009, Gaga appeared in French television show Taratata, where she performed "Eh, Eh" on the piano, while wearing a red mask. "Eh, Eh" was also performed during the original version of The Monster Ball Tour, where the song signified the singer's rebirth as she descended from the top amidst white lights and mechanical fog. She wore a giant human sized gyroscope around her, which was developed by the Haus of Gaga and was named "The Orbit". The song was removed from the setlist in early 2010.

== Track listing and formats ==
Australian CD Single (Extra Limited Edition)

1. "Eh, Eh (Nothing Else I Can Say)" – 2:57
2. "Poker Face" (Space Cowboy Remix) – 4:56

French CD Single (Limited Edition)

1. "Eh, Eh (Nothing Else I Can Say)" – 2:56
2. "Eh, Eh (Nothing Else I Can Say)" [Pet Shop Boys Radio Mix] – 2:49
3. "Eh, Eh (Nothing Else I Can Say)" [Random Soul Synthetic Club Remix] – 5:27

iTunes Remix Single

1. "Eh, Eh (Nothing Else I Can Say)" [Random Soul Synthetic Club Remix] – 5:29
2. "Eh, Eh (Nothing Else I Can Say)" [Pet Shop Boys Radio Mix] – 2:53

Italian iTunes download

1. "Eh, Eh (Nothing Else I Can Say)" [Electric Piano & Human Beatbox Version] – 3:03

iTunes Remix EP

1. "Eh, Eh (Nothing Else I Can Say)" – 2:57
2. "Eh, Eh (Nothing Else I Can Say)" [Pet Shop Boys Radio Mix] – 2:53
3. "Eh, Eh (Nothing Else I Can Say)" [Bollywood Remix] – 3:29
4. "Eh, Eh (Nothing Else I Can Say)" [FrankMusik 'Cut Snare Edit' Remix] – 3:50
5. "Eh, Eh (Nothing Else I Can Say)" [Electric Piano & Human Beat Box Version] – 3:03
6. "Eh, Eh (Nothing Else I Can Say)" [Mattafix Remix] – 3:21
7. "Eh, Eh (Nothing Else I Can Say)" [Random Soul Synthetic Club Remix] – 5:29
8. "Eh, Eh (Nothing Else I Can Say)" [Pet Shop Boys Club Remix] – 6:31

== Credits and personnel ==
Credits adapted from the liner notes of The Fame.

- Lady Gaga – vocals, songwriting
- Martin Kierszenbaum – songwriting, production
- Tony Ugval – audio engineering
- Robert Orton – audio mixing
- Gene Grimaldi – audio mastering at Oasis Mastering, Burbank, California
- Recorded at Cherrytree Recording Studios, Santa Monica, California

== Charts ==
=== Weekly charts ===
Weekly chart performance for "Eh, Eh (Nothing Else I Can Say)"
Chart (2009–2010)	Peak position
Australia (ARIA)	15
Belgium (Ultratip Bubbling Under Wallonia)	10
Canada Hot 100 (Billboard)	68
Canada CHR/Top 40 (Billboard)	39
Canada Hot AC (Billboard)	27
Czech Republic Airplay (ČNS IFPI)	6
Denmark (Tracklisten)	14
European Hot 100 Singles (Billboard)	40
France (SNEP)	7
Hungary (Dance Top 40)	22
Hungary (Single Top 40)	8
Netherlands (Dutch Top 40)	12
Netherlands (Single Top 100)	34
New Zealand (Recorded Music NZ)	9
Slovakia Airplay (ČNS IFPI)	67
Sweden (Sverigetopplistan)	2
US Dance/Electronic Digital Songs (Billboard)	31

=== Year-end charts ===
2009 year-end chart performance for "Eh, Eh (Nothing Else I Can Say)"
Chart (2009)	Position
Australia (ARIA)	81
France (SNEP)	66
Hungary (Dance Top 40)	134
Netherlands (Dutch Top 40)	80
Sweden (Sverigetopplistan)	34

== Certifications ==
Certifications and sales for "Eh, Eh (Nothing Else I Can Say)"
Region	Certification	Certified units/sales
Australia (ARIA)	2× Platinum	140,000^{‡}
Denmark (IFPI Danmark)	Gold	7,500^{^}
France	—	52,457
New Zealand (RMNZ)	Gold	7,500^{*}
Sweden (GLF)	Gold	10,000^{^}
United States (RIAA)	Gold	500,000^{‡}
^{*} Sales figures based on certification alone.^{^} Shipments figures based on certification alone.^{‡} Sales+streaming figures based on certification alone.

== Release history ==
Release dates and formats for "Eh, Eh (Nothing Else I Can Say)"
Region	Date	Format	Version	Label	Ref.
Australia	January 10, 2009	Digital download	Original	Interscope	
New Zealand	January 10, 2009	Digital download	Original	Interscope	
Denmark	February 20, 2009	Digital download	Random Soul Synthetic mix	Interscope	
Various	March 16, 2009	Digital download	Electric piano and human beat box version	Interscope	
Various	June 15, 2009	Digital download	Remixes EP	Interscope	
France	September 7, 2009	CD	Original	Polydor	
