= The Cherrytree Sessions =

EP by Lady Gaga
- Released: February 3, 2009
- Recorded: 2009
- Studio: The Cherrytree House
- Length: 8:48
- Labels: Streamline; KonLive; Cherrytree; Interscope
- Producers: Martin Kierszenbaum; RedOne

Lady Gaga chronology
The Fame (2008)	The Cherrytree Sessions (2009)	Hitmixes (2009)

The Cherrytree Sessions is the first extended play (EP) by American singer-songwriter Lady Gaga. It consists of three acoustic versions of "Poker Face", "Just Dance", and "Eh, Eh (Nothing Else I Can Say)". The EP was released on February 3, 2009, initially released only through Borders stores and via digital download, and was later reissued on CD in August 2010.

The Cherrytree Sessions received generally positive reviews from critics, who praised Gaga's vocal abilities and the instrumentation of the three tracks, including their unusual incorporation of styles such as cabaret and beatboxing. It reached number 32 on the Mexican Albums Chart.

== Background and composition ==
The Cherrytree Sessions is a series of EPs first envisaged by Cherrytree Records label head and producer Martin Kierszenbaum in order to promote his artists. With the assistance of Tony Ugval, Kierszenbaum was able to secure footage and music recordings of several performances from artists on the label's roster. Following requests from fans of the label's music, Kierszenbaum decided to release them commercially, and stated that "before long, we found ourselves with an extraordinary collection of recordings: intimate at times, unexpected at others."

Gaga's performances for The Cherrytree Sessions were first released as a video posted to the label's website. It begins with Gaga and producer Space Cowboy surprising Kierszenbaum in his office, known as The Cherrytree House. After discussing her international travels, Gaga performed an acoustic version of "Brown Eyes" at the piano where she had sung for Kierszenbaum the first time they met. She and Space Cowboy then performed a stripped-down version of "Just Dance" on their keyboards, before Gaga returned to the piano for an acoustic version of "Poker Face". The performance coincided with Gaga reaching number one on the Billboard Hot Digital Songs chart with "Just Dance" in 2008, and was available for streaming as a webisode on the Cherrytree Records website.

The EP itself consists of three tracks recorded live from the event, all of which had previously been successful singles released from Gaga's first studio album, The Fame (2008). AllMusic compared the "solo piano rendition" of "Poker Face" to the style of cabaret, while "Just Dance" had only synths as its instrumentation. The final song, "Eh, Eh (Nothing Else I Can Say)" makes use of keyboards (played by Martin Kierszenbaum) and beatboxing, which is performed by Space Cowboy.

== Critical reception ==
Professional ratings
Review scores
Source	Rating
AllMusic	3/5 stars
Bloomberg L.P.	3/4 stars
Daily Express	3/5 stars

The Cherrytree Sessions was released on February 3, 2009, in the United States and was an import in European nations, including France. Mark Beech of Bloomberg L.P. gave The Cherrytree Sessions a positive review, awarding it three out of four stars. He praised Gaga's singing abilities and noted that the EP "shows Lady Gaga isn't all combustible miniskirts and flame-throwing bras." Simon Gage of the Daily Express gave the album three out of five stars, expressing surprise at Gaga's singing abilities. "Often hidden under those dastardly catchy Eurobeats," he noted, "on these earlier, simpler versions of tracks such as Poker Face and Just Dance, her voice gets a bit more of a chance to shine, as do the songs." This sentiment was echoed by Stephen Thomas Erlewine of AllMusic, awarding three stars out of five, who felt that the performances were "effective showcases for Gaga's charisma and songwriting." Erlewine praised the music of "Eh, Eh (Nothing Else I Can Say)" in particular, noting that its "bare-bones mix" was complementary to the release's aesthetic.

== Commercial performance ==
The Cherrytree Sessions debuted at 45 on the Mexican Albums Chart on August 20, 2010, and moved to 32 the next week. Although it failed to enter any of the Billboard album charts, according to Nielsen SoundScan, the EP had sold 9,000 copies in the United States by September 2010.

== Track listing ==
The Cherrytree Sessions track listing
No.	Title	Writer(s)	Producer(s)	Length
1.	"Poker Face" (live at the Cherrytree House piano & voice version)	Lady Gaga; RedOne	Martin Kierszenbaum	3:39
2.	"Just Dance" (live at the Cherrytree House stripped down version)	Gaga; RedOne; Aliaune Thiam	RedOne; Kierszenbaum	2:06
3.	"Eh, Eh (Nothing Else I Can Say)" (electric piano & human beat box version)	Gaga; Kierszenbaum	Kierszenbaum	3:03
Total length:				8:48

=== Note ===
- Version of album included in boxset The Singles, have also song Christmas Tree featuring Space Cowboy.

== Personnel ==
Credits for The Cherrytree Sessions per AllMusic and liner notes.

- Mary Fagot – art direction
- Vincent Herbert – executive producer, A&R
- Martin Kierszenbaum – production, A&R
- Lady Gaga – vocals, piano
- Meeno – photography
- RedOne – production
- Space Cowboy – human beat box
- Tony Ugval – engineering, mixing

== Charts ==
Chart performance
Chart (2010)	Peak position
Mexican Albums (Top 100 Mexico)	32

== Release history ==
Release dates and formats
Region	Date	Format	Label
Canada	February 3, 2009	Digital download	Universal
United States	February 3, 2009	Digital download	Streamline; KonLive; Cherrytree; Interscope
United States (Borders only)	March 3, 2009	CD	Streamline; KonLive; Cherrytree; Interscope
United States	August 3, 2010	CD	Streamline; KonLive; Cherrytree; Interscope
France	August 3, 2010	CD	Streamline; KonLive; Cherrytree; Interscope
Germany	August 3, 2010	CD	Streamline; KonLive; Cherrytree; Interscope
United Kingdom	August 3, 2010	CD	Streamline; KonLive; Cherrytree; Interscope
Canada	August 10, 2010	CD	Universal
Mexico	August 10, 2010	CD; digital download	Universal
