= Poker Face (song) =

2008 single by Lady Gaga

Single by Lady Gaga

from the album The Fame
- B-side: "Just Dance"
- Released: September 23, 2008
- Studio: Record Plant (Los Angeles)
- Genre: Synth-pop; dance-pop
- Length: 3:58
- Label: Streamline; KonLive; Cherrytree; Interscope
- Songwriters: Lady Gaga; RedOne
- Producer: RedOne

Lady Gaga singles chronology
"Just Dance" (2008)	"Poker Face" (2008)	"Eh, Eh (Nothing Else I Can Say)" (2009)

Music video
- "Poker Face" on YouTube

"Poker Face" is a song by American singer Lady Gaga from her debut studio album, The Fame (2008). The track was released on September 23, 2008, as the album's second single, through Streamline Records, KonLive, Cherrytree Records, and Interscope Records. Gaga wrote the song alongside its producer, RedOne. It was also recorded at Record Plant Studios, based in Hollywood, Los Angeles. The song is a synth-pop and dance-pop tune in the key of G♯ minor, following in the footsteps of her previous single "Just Dance", but with a much darker musical tone. The song revolves around bisexuality, and was a tribute by Gaga to her rock and roll boyfriends. Its lyrics feature various sexual innuendos.

Upon being released, "Poker Face" was acclaimed by most critics, who praised the song's robotic hook and chorus. Commercially, it topped the charts in Australia, Austria, Belgium, Canada, Denmark, El Salvador, Finland, France, Germany, Ireland, the Netherlands, New Zealand, Norway, Romania, Scotland, Slovakia, Sweden, Switzerland, the United Kingdom, and the United States. With over 14 million copies sold, "Poker Face" is one of the world's best-selling singles ever and became the best-selling single of 2009 worldwide with over 9.8 million in sales that year alone. It was also certified diamond in Brazil, Canada, and the United States.

The song's accompanying music video, directed by Ray Kay, premiered on October 22, 2008, and features Gaga singing it in various costumes and playing strip poker in a getaway villa. She performed the song on the eighth season of the television show American Idol, besides multiple other television appearances, all of her concert tours, and the Super Bowl LI halftime show. "Poker Face" was nominated for both Song of the Year and Record of the Year at the 52nd Annual Grammy Awards, and won the Grammy Award for Best Dance Recording.

== Background ==
"Poker Face" was written by Gaga and RedOne, while production was also handled by RedOne. Gaga stated in an interview that "Poker Face" was written by her as a pop song and was a tribute to her "rock 'n' roll boyfriends". She also stated that the main idea behind the song was sex and gambling. When Rolling Stone magazine asked about the meaning of the line "bluffin' with my muffin", Gaga explained that it really was a metaphor for her vulva, noting "it's my pussy's poker face!". She added that it came from a lyric "Blueberry kisses, the muffin man misses them kisses" from an unreleased track called "Blueberry Kisses" where a girl wanted her boyfriend to perform cunnilingus on her.

During her Fame Ball Tour performance at Palm Springs, California, on April 11, 2009, Gaga explained to the crowd the true meaning behind the term "Poker Face" used in the song. She suggested that the song dealt with her personal experience with bisexuality. The idea behind the song was to be with a man but fantasizing about a woman, hence the man in the song needs to read her "Poker Face" to understand what is going through her mind.

== Composition ==
"Poker Face" is a synth-pop and dance-pop song, and follows the footsteps of Gaga's previous single "Just Dance". Whereas "Just Dance" was predominately electropop, "Poker Face" carries a dark sound with clear vocals on the chorus and a pop hook while combining the synths from "Just Dance" and the more dance-oriented beat of the next single "LoveGame". According to Kerri Mason of Billboard, the composition "carr[ies] the pleather-and-sequins vibe of the downtown New York scene out of the underground and onto the FM dial without losing its smut and sass."

'Poker Face'
A 23-second sample from "Poker Face" which plays the chorus, where Gaga's voice spans from B_{4} to F♯_{3}, followed by the stuttering hook which references Boney M.'s song "Ma Baker".

"Poker Face" is set in a common time time signature, with a fast tempo of 120 beats per minute. It is written in the key of G♯ minor with Gaga's vocal range spanning from the note F♯_{3} to the note B_{4}. It begins with a medium tempo followed by electronic chord arrangement and the "Mum-mum-mum-mah" hook. The chords follow in this order: G♯m–E/G♯–F♯, and then for the chorus G♯m–E–B-F♯. This is followed by the sound of dance music, produced by a powerful beat from the instruments, and a stuttering hook following the chorus.

Lyrically, "Poker Face" is all about sexual innuendo and teasing. According to Daily Star, the chorus repeats two alternating lyrics. After the hook "can't read my poker face", the backup singer says "she's got me like nobody". Gaga explained in an interview with them that the line carries a bit of an undertone of confusion about love and sex. However, the liner notes from the album booklet indicate both these lines only repeat "she's got me like nobody". According to the BBC, the "Mum-mum-mum-mah" hook used in the song references Boney M.'s 1977 hit "Ma Baker".

== Critical reception ==
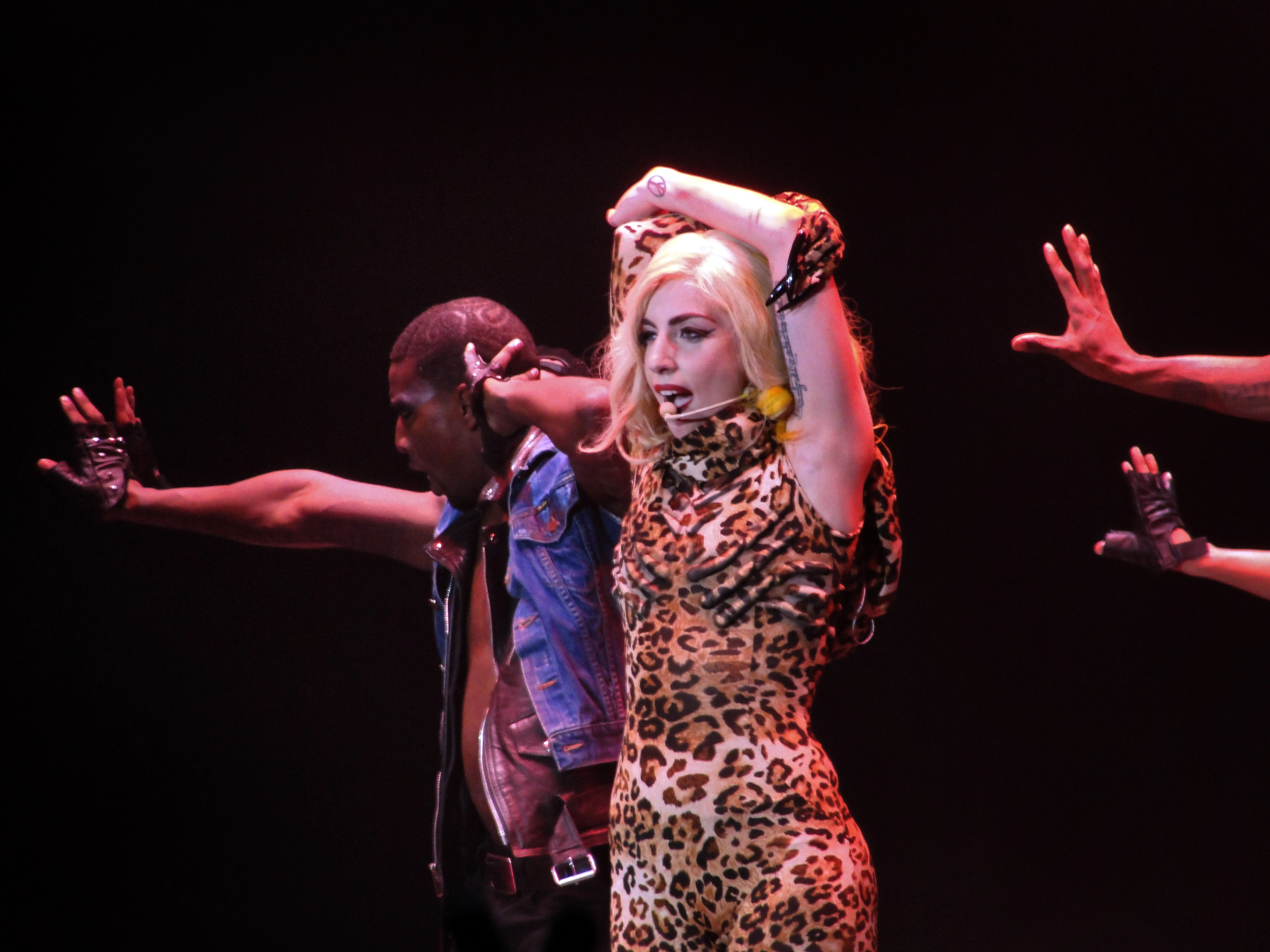
Gaga performing "Poker Face" during the 2010 leg of The Monster Ball Tour

Upon release, "Poker Face" received critical acclaim. Priya Elan from The Times, in a review of The Fame, said that "Poker Face" was one of the finest moments of the album with its "love-as-card-game cheek". BBC Music reviewed the "strut-tastic" single as "expressing her overwhelming desire for celebrity and fortune." Bill Lamb of About.com said, "'Poker Face' works well on pop radio, but with slight mixing alterations it would be equally at home in a dark, sweaty, late night party atmosphere. She has refreshed the pop world in the US and UK at one of the slowest times of the year. 'Poker Face' keeps the motors humming as everyone waits for the next step forward from Lady Gaga." Chris Williams of Billboard also gave a positive review of the song saying, "Once again, hooks are aplenty, with '80s-inspired synthesizers, robotic verses and a warm, sunny hook in the chorus, which is even more addictive than the previous single ('Just Dance')...With a focused artistic vision, a swagger in her interview style and above all, a fantastic collection of diverse pop nuggets, Gaga is playing her cards right—and "Poker" is another obvious ace."

Slant Magazine music reviewer Sal Cinquemani included "Poker Face" among the songs that work in The Fame, namely tracks like "Starstruck," "Paper Gangsta" and "Summerboy". Matthew Chisling from Allmusic called the song "infectious" and along with the title track "The Fame", complimented them for "rejuvenating the vibe on the album for its second half." Andy Downing from The Chicago Tribune called the song "jaunty" while reviewing Gaga's Fame Ball tour. Evan Sawdey from PopMatters.com felt that "Poker Face" along with the track "Paparazzi", duplicate much of the same "glitzy territory that previous single 'Just Dance' had covered, but never once does it feel like Gaga is deliberately repeating herself." Rolling Stone in a review for The Fame Ball Tour compared the live acoustic "bluesy" version of "Poker Face" with the music of singer Amy Winehouse. Erika Hobert from the New Times Broward-Palm Beach newspaper called the song "trashtastic Europop." The song was nominated for Grammy Awards in the categories for Song of the Year, Record of the Year, and Best Dance Recording, ultimately winning the last of these.

Rolling Stone ranked it number ninety-six on their list of 100 Best Songs of the 2000s decade. In October 2011, NME placed it at number 103 on its list "150 Best Tracks of the Past 15 Years". In rankings of Gaga's discography, Billboard placed "Poker Face" second on a list of her 15 greatest songs in 2019, while Marie Claire ranked it ninth in a list published the same year. The Guardian placed it seventh among 30 songs in 2020, and The Independent ranked it 14th in a ranking of all her songs published in 2025.

== Commercial performance ==
In the United States, the song debuted at number 92 on the Billboard Hot 100 for the week of January 3, 2009, and reached number six on March 7 of that year. The next week, the song climbed another three places, reaching the number three position and staying there for two additional weeks. On the Billboard issue dated April 11, 2009, the song topped the chart. "Poker Face" became Gaga's second consecutive number one song on the Billboard Hot 100, marking the first time a new artist has had their first two charting singles hit number one on that chart since Christina Aguilera did so with "Genie in a Bottle" and "What a Girl Wants" in 1999 and 2000. The song spent one week at the top of the chart, nine weeks at number two, 18 weeks in the Top 10 and stayed on the Hot 100 for a total of 40 weeks. "Poker Face" also peaked on both the Hot Dance Airplay and Hot Dance Club Play charts. It became the first single since Madonna's 2006 single "Sorry" to top all the three dance charts in a single week including the Hot Dance Singles Sales chart. The song has been certified Diamond by the Recording Industry Association of America (RIAA), and sold 7.5 million paid digital downloads in the United States as of February 2018, according to Nielsen SoundScan. Gaga is the first artist in digital history to top the six and seven million mark in paid downloads with two songs, the first being "Just Dance". "Poker Face" is Gaga's most digitally-sold track in the United States.

In Canada, the song debuted at number 41 on the Canadian Hot 100. On the chart dated December 13, 2008, "Poker Face" ascended to the number one spot and then spent nine non-consecutive weeks at the top. The song was later certified Diamond by Music Canada for sales of 800,000 copies. "Poker Face" entered the Australian charts at number 26, and in its seventh week peaked at number one. "Poker Face" has shipped over 1,050,000 copies in Australia, being certified fifteen times platinum by the Australian Recording Industry Association (ARIA). It held the record for the longest-charting song in ARIA Chart history of 106 weeks until this was broken in May 2015 by Vance Joy's "Riptide". In New Zealand, the song debuted on the official chart at number 21. In its sixth week, it peaked on the chart, spending 10 consecutive weeks at number one. "Poker Face" was later certified quintuple platinum, selling over 150,000 copies according to the Recording Industry Association of New Zealand (RIANZ).

In the United Kingdom, "Poker Face" debuted at number 30 on the UK Singles Chart. After three months, it climbed to number one and provided Gaga with her second consecutive British number one single. It was the biggest-selling digital single in the United Kingdom, before being overtaken by "I Gotta Feeling" by The Black Eyed Peas in June 2010. However, the song became the country's biggest-selling single of 2009, and was awarded The Record of the Year. By September 2017 the song had 1.18 million pure sales and had been streamed 8.27 million times. In January 2025, the song was awarded a quadruple platinum certification from the British Phonographic Industry (BPI) having sold 2.4 million copies in the UK with 155 million streams as of February 2025.

In Italy, the song debuted at number 19 and peaked at number two. The song has also reached the peak in a number of European countries including Austria, Belgium (Flanders and Wallonia), Denmark, Finland, France, Germany, Ireland, Netherlands, Norway, Poland, Sweden and Switzerland. In Germany, "Poker Face" became the most successful download single ever and the first to sell more than 500,000 downloads. The song also spent 16 non-consecutive weeks atop the Billboard European Hot 100 Singles chart. By November 2009, the song had sold over 9.8 million copies globally according to IFPI, making it the world's best-selling overall single that year. It went on to sell over 13.4 million copies by 2013, making it one of the best-selling singles ever. More than fifteen years after its release, "Poker Face" entered the Billboard Global 200, established in 2020, and later peaked at number 45 on May 17, 2025, spending 63 weeks on the ranking.

== Music video ==
Gaga playing poker in the music video, wearing her anvil-like shoulder pads. She said the design was meant to evoke a futuristic look, a theme that several journalists also noted in their commentary on the video's visual style.

The music video for "Poker Face", directed by Ray Kay, was filmed over the course of a day at a mansion in Malibu and featured bwin branded poker equipment as product placement. The video premiered on October 22, 2008. It is set by a pool, as well as in a mansion. It begins with Gaga emerging from the pool wearing a mirror masquerade mask and a black sleeveless latex bodysuit with a jagged shoulder pad, with two Great Danes beside her. She throws the mask aside, and the song begins with a facial shot of Gaga singing it. Gaga wears a metallic sticker on her left cheek in this shot. Featured in the video are scenes of Gaga in a mansion and dancing poolside with her dancers in a turquoise leotard. Gaga attends a wild party where every man and woman tries their luck on a strip poker game. The party gets wilder when all the party's guests strip down to their underwear, dance around, and share kisses with each other. The video also features several white mannequins on her swimming pool deck. During the musical interlude before the "I won't tell you that I love you" bridge, Gaga is shown in her trademark "Pop Music Will Never Be Low Brow" sunglasses while sitting beside the pool. The video ends with the head shot of Gaga singing the "mum-mum-mum-ma" hook.

Gaga explained the main idea behind the music video for "Poker Face" in the nineteenth episode of her "Transmission Gagavision" series: "I knew I wanted it to be sexy, so I thought no pants, because that's sexy, [...] And I knew I wanted it to be futuristic, so I thought shoulder pads, because that's my thing." The music video premiered on British MTV on February 17, 2009. In some versions of the video, the words "muffin" (being a slang term for a woman's vagina), "Russian Roulette" and "gun" are censored out (bleeped).

Tom Breihan of Stereogum believed the music video solidified Gaga as an artist whose music videos are always an "event", with the imagery sometimes being even more important than the music itself. He added, "if Gaga seemed slightly eccentric in the 'Just Dance' video, the 'Poker Face' clip revealed her to be some kind of sci-fi demon." An article by Rolling Stone called the video "robotic, dark", featuring elaborate fashion pieces, such as the "shoulder pads that look like anvils". Rolling Stone Australia opined the "Poker Face" video "introduced Gaga the fashionphile", with a "flurry of looks [that] were bewilderingly strange and sultry". Billboard's Hannah Dailey found it a "sleek, avant-garde project" featuring "futuristic outfits" and "stunning choreography". On June 21, 2009, the video won the Best International Artist Video at the 2009 MuchMusic Video Awards. The video received four nominations at the 2009 MTV Video Music Awards, in the categories of Video of the Year, Best New Artist, Best Female Video and Best Pop Video. Along with five other nominations for "Paparazzi", Gaga was tied with Beyoncé for most nominations each for that year. On June 15, 2022, the music video surpassed one billion views on YouTube, becoming Gaga's third video to reach the milestone.

In June 2010, Gaga held a reverse auction for one of the necklaces worn in the music video, designed by Brian Lichtenberg. All the proceeds from the auction went to the Lupus Foundation of America.

== Live performances ==
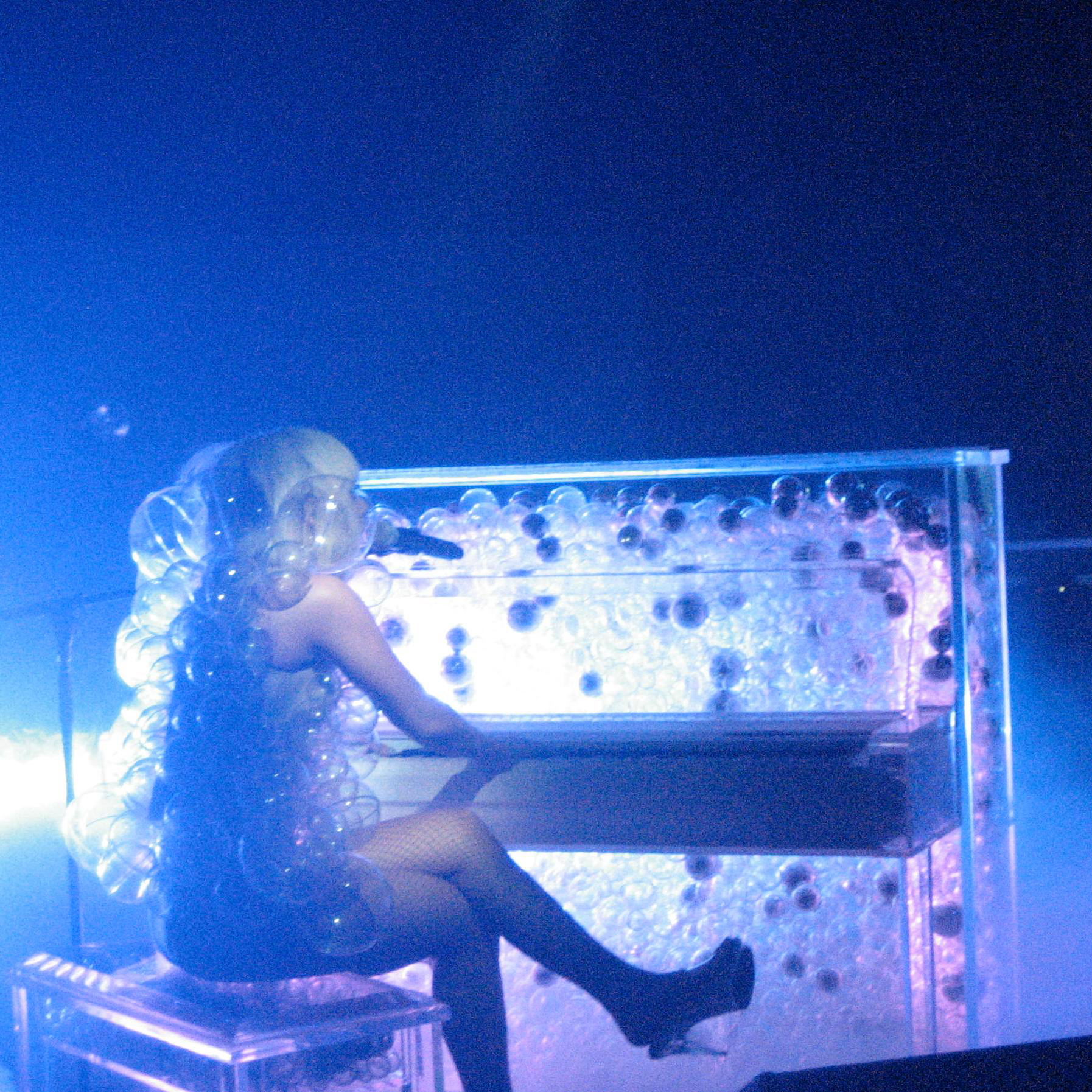
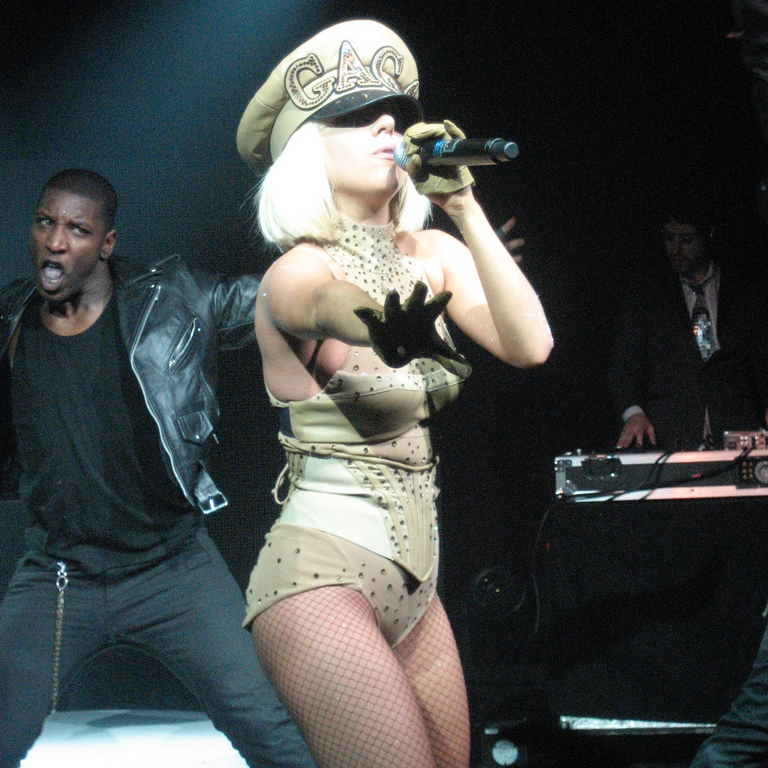
Gaga performing the piano version of "Poker Face" wearing a dress made of plastic bubbles (top), and singing its album version as the encore (bottom), both at The Fame Ball Tour in 2009

"Poker Face" has been performed by Gaga at a number of shows including the AOL Sessions, the Cherrytree House of Interscope Records, and also the MTV sessions. The song was performed by Gaga both in the original version and the acoustic piano version in her headlining The Fame Ball Tour. She performed the piano version wearing a dress made of plastic transparent bubbles and playing the glass piano with her stilletoes with a glowing mannequin, like the music video, standing in front of the stage. Gaga claimed that the transparent bubble filled piano was specifically made to match her dress. The actual version was performed by Gaga as the final song of the encore, after "Boys, Boys, Boys". She started the performance saying "Some say Lady Gaga is a lie, and they're right: I am a lie, and every day I kill to make it true." Gaga wore a nude corseted leotard embellished with crystals and an admiral's hat during the performance.

On April 1, 2009, both the acoustic and normal version of "Poker Face" were performed live on Fox's American Idol. The performance started with Gaga sitting at a Plexiglass piano filled with bubbles and bathed in pink light. She started singing the second verse of "Poker Face" in a Bette Midler style, accompanied by a violin player while wearing a shiny aluminum shoulder pad and platinum bleached blond wig. After the first chorus, the pace increased, and the original intro for the song started. Gaga got up from her seat and proceeded to perform the song in the middle of the stage. She wore a silvery leotard with a giant star on her shoulder and tassels. As the song progressed to the intermediate verse, the violinist played a hoe-down version of the music, and Gaga danced around frantically over the stage. The performance ended with Gaga staring towards the audience while revealing an open zipper, patched over her left eye. The performance was described as an "alien-disco performance art." Cortney Harding of Billboard wrote, "[it was] Gaga's crowning TV moment ... show[ing] middle America that she was a bona fide pop star."

The acoustic version was performed by Gaga at BBC Live & In-Session on April 19, 2009. On the same day, she had her first appearance on Italian TV, on the TV program Quelli che... il Calcio. She also performed "Poker Face" in the United Kingdom on The Paul O'Grady Show. First she played an acoustic version first before going on to the normal version, and a rock version on Friday Night with Jonathan Ross. On May 12, 2009, Gaga performed "Poker Face" on The Ellen DeGeneres Show while wearing a gyroscope on her head, designed by theatrical hat designer Nasir Mazhar and playing the piano while standing on the stool. Gaga referred to the gyroscope as her "Gaga barrier". It prevented Ellen DeGeneres from greeting her because of the size of the gear. A remixed version of "Poker Face" and "LoveGame" was performed at the 2009 MuchMusic Video Awards, during the indoor-outdoor streetside show. This performance, which included Gaga being trapped in a fake subway car surrounded by fake police officers, was billed as a tribute to New York City. Snippets of the song was performed by Gaga at the thirty-fifth season of American comedy show Saturday Night Live, while wearing a giant contraption ("The Orbit") of several metallic concentric rings that rotated around her. In September 2009, Gaga appeared in French television show Taratata, where she added an improvised verse in French while performing "Poker Face".

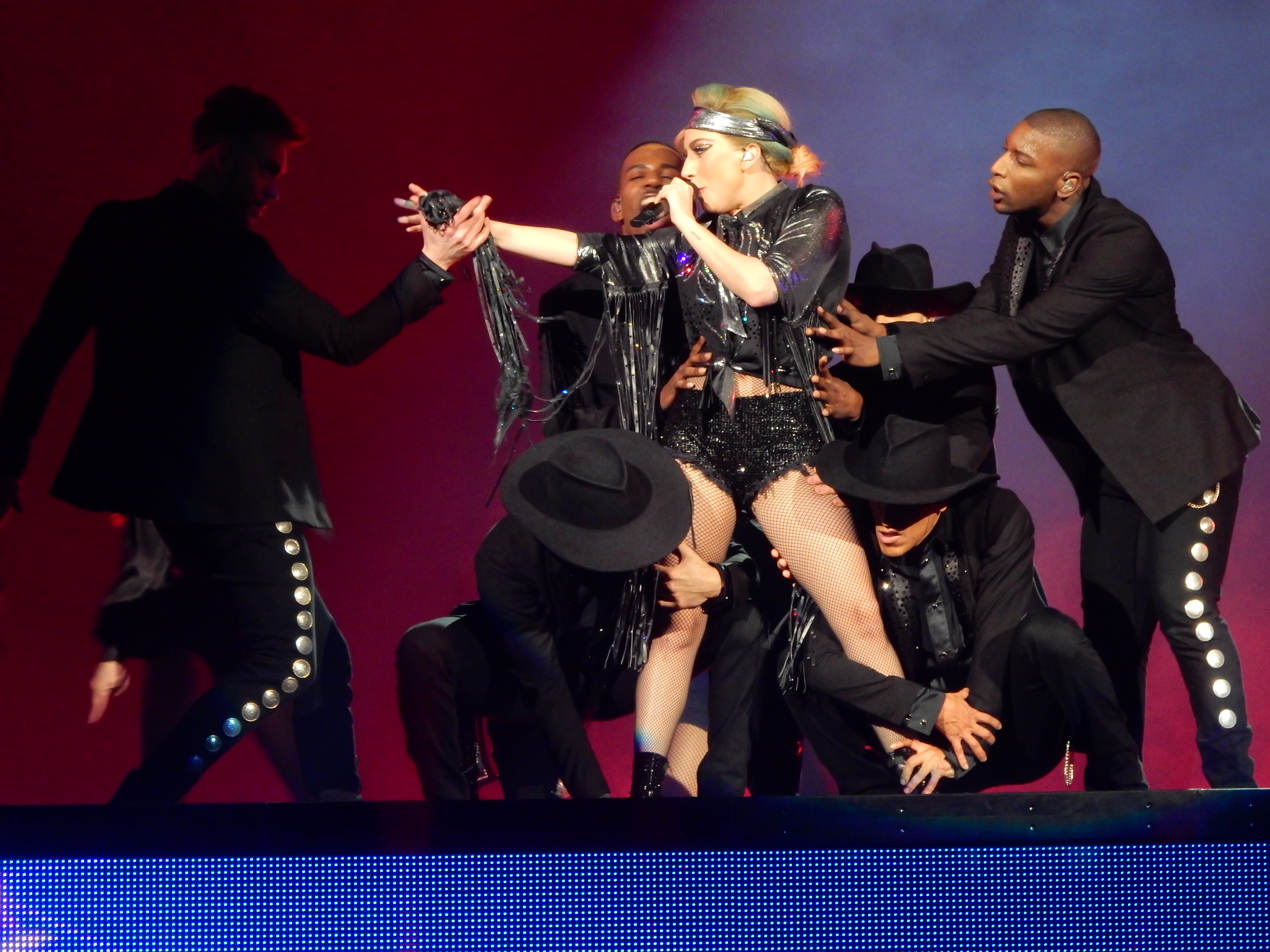
Gaga, surrounded by her male dancers, performing "Poker Face" in 2018 on the Joanne World Tour

The track was part of the setlist of Gaga's The Monster Ball Tour. The piano version was played by Gaga while balancing on the piano stool and holding one leg up in the air. Rapper Kid Cudi joined her then to perform his song "Make Her Say" which contains a sample of "Poker Face". The actual version was performed at the last segment of the show. Gaga wore a dress made of guns and during the performance she pumped her hands in the air. For the revamped Monster Ball shows in 2010–11, Gaga was dancing around the stage while whipping a chain. "Poker Face" was also performed at the 52nd Annual Grammy Awards, where Gaga opened the show with the song while standing on a pedestal. Midway through the performance, she was flung into the garbage chute of her 'Fame Factory' stage set, before emerging seated at a piano, facing Elton John. In May 2011, Gaga performed the song during Radio 1's Big Weekend in Carlisle, Cumbria. The song was included on the set list of her Born This Way Ball tour (2012–2013), where she sported a modified version of her infamous meat dress. Gaga and her dancers put themselves headfirst into enormous meat grinders during the performance. For her 2014 residency show, Lady Gaga Live at Roseland Ballroom she chose to perform the song in a piano-only rendition. In the same year, at the Artrave: The Artpop Ball tour, Gaga performed the song in a medley with "Just Dance" and "Telephone" while wearing knee-length white dress and heels, and a bob wig.

In October 2016, Gaga appeared in the Carpool Karaoke segment of The Late Late Show with James Corden, where "Poker Face" was one of the songs Gaga sang in the vehicle. On February 5, 2017, Gaga performed the song during the Super Bowl LI halftime show. After descending from the top of the building, she started singing "Poker Face" on a tall pillar, before continuing air acrobatics and performing the song while hanging on a rope in the air. "Poker Face" was later performed at the Coachella Festival, where Gaga performed it in the encore alongside "Bad Romance". The track was also part of the setlist of Gaga's Joanne World Tour (2017–2018), where she was wearing a black bejewelled fringe leotard for the performance. The singer performed the song during Lady Gaga Enigma + Jazz & Piano (2018–2021), her Las Vegas residency, which involved two different shows. During the Enigma shows, Gaga performed "Poker Face" as the second track of the setlist, while on the Jazz and Piano show, a stripped-down piano version of the song was performed. It was also performed on piano during Gaga's live-streamed concert on September 30, 2021, which was in celebration of her second collaborative album with Tony Bennett, called Love for Sale. In 2022, Gaga performed "Poker Face" at The Chromatica Ball stadium tour.

For Gaga's performance of "Poker Face" in her 2025 promotional concerts for Mayhem, which included a headlining set at Coachella 2025, the stage was transformed into a life-sized chessboard to accompany a choreographed dance sequence. The performance featured a stylized battle between two opposing groups—one led by Gaga and the other by a veiled figure dressed in white. The routine concluded with Gaga emerging victorious, prompting the audience to chant "Off with Her Head" toward the defeated figure. The number was later incorporated into the Mayhem Ball tour, following the same staging and choreography.

== Cover versions and adaptations ==
In 2009, a single by rapper Kid Cudi featuring Kanye West and Common titled "Make Her Say" was released; it contains a vocal sample of the acoustic version of "Poker Face" from The Cherrytree Sessions EP. It features Kanye West, who also produced the track, and Common, as well as scratches from DJ A-Trak. Actor Christopher Walken performed a special a cappella rendition of "Poker Face" on BBC1's Friday Night with Jonathan Ross for Halloween 2009. Rock band Faith No More covered the song live during several dates on their reunion tour in 2009–10. Gaga reacted to their cover on Twitter in June 2009, saying she was a "huge fan" of the band.

The song was also featured in the South Park episode titled "Whale Whores", sung on Rock Band by series character Eric Cartman, with guitar by Kyle Broflovski and drums by Kenny McCormick. During Cartman's performance, Stan interrupts to rant about Japanese whaling. After Stan gives a heartfelt speech and leaves on the verge of tears, the other boys resume the song, and Cartman replaces the next verse's second line with "I don't give a crap 'bout whales so go and hug a tree." On March 16, 2010, South Park's version of "Poker Face" became available as a downloadable song for the video game Rock Band, on the same day a Lady Gaga track pack featuring the original song was released.

Lea Michele and Idina Menzel, in character as Rachel Berry and Shelby Corcoran respectively, covered an acoustic version of "Poker Face" in the "Theatricality" episode of Glee. Their version debuted at position 100 on the Billboard Hot 100, and moved up to a peak of 20 the next week. It went on to become one of the show's most popular recordings; having sold 410,000 U.S. downloads, it remains the tenth best-selling song in the show's history.

"Weird Al" Yankovic included the chorus in his polka medley "Polka Face" from his 2011 album Alpocalypse. During the end credits of the 2012 The Simpsons season-finale episode "Lisa Goes Gaga", Homer Simpson performed a parody version entitled "Homer Face". On February 19, 2021, Kelly Clarkson sang a rock cover of the song during her talk show, The Kelly Clarkson Show, on the Kellyoke segment.

== Track listings and formats ==
Australian CD single

1. "Poker Face" (Album Version) – 3:58
2. "Just Dance" (Robots to Mars Mix) – 4:37

German CD single

1. "Poker Face" (Album Version) – 3:58
2. "Just Dance" (RedOne Remix featuring Kardinal Offishall) – 4:19

German CD maxi single

1. "Poker Face" (Album Version) – 3:57
2. "Poker Face" (Space Cowboy Remix) – 4:53
3. "Just Dance" (Robots to Mars Mix) – 4:37
4. "Poker Face" (video) – 3:39

French CD single

1. "Poker Face" (Main Version) – 3:58
2. "Poker Face" (Glam As You Club Mix by Guéna LG) – 7:51
3. "Poker Face" (Dave Audé Remix) – 8:12

US CD single – Remixes

1. "Poker Face" (Space Cowboy Remix) – 4:25
2. "Poker Face" (Jody den Broeder Remix) – 8:07
3. "Poker Face" (Dave Audé Remix) – 8:12
4. "Poker Face" (Album Version) – 3:57
5. "Poker Face" (Instrumental) – 3:59

UK CD single

1. "Poker Face" – 3:58
2. "Poker Face" (Tommy Sparks & The Fury Remix) – 3:58

UK 7" picture single

A. "Poker Face" – 3:57
B. "Poker Face" (Space Cowboy Remix) – 4:53

iTunes EP

1. "Poker Face" (Space Cowboy Remix) – 4:54
2. "Poker Face" (Dave Audé Club Remix) – 8:13
3. "Poker Face" (Jody den Broeder Club Remix) – 8:05

Spotify single – Remixes Part 1

1. "Poker Face" (Glam As You Radio Mix) – 3:49
2. "Poker Face" (Jody den Broeder Edit) – 4:21
3. "Poker Face" (LLG vs GLG Radio Mix by Guéna LG) – 4:02
4. "Poker Face" (Dave Audé Edit) – 3:50
5. "Poker Face" (Space Cowboy Remix) – 4:54

Spotify single – Remixes Part 2

1. "Poker Face" (Glam As You Club Mix) – 7:50
2. "Poker Face" (Jody den Broeder Remix) – 8:05
3. "Poker Face" (LLG vs GLG Club Mix) – 6:30
4. "Poker Face" (Dave Audé Remix) – 8:13

== Credits and personnel ==
Credits adapted from the liner notes of The Fame.

- Lady Gaga – lead vocals, backing vocals, songwriter, producer
- RedOne – backing vocals, engineering, instrumentation, songwriter, producer, programming
- Gene Grimaldi – mastering
- Robert Orton – mixing
- Dave Russell – engineering

== Charts ==
=== Weekly charts ===
Weekly chart performance
Chart (2008–2010)	Peak position
Australia (ARIA)	1
Austria (Ö3 Austria Top 40)	1
Belgium (Ultratop 50 Flanders)	1
Belgium (Ultratop 50 Wallonia)	1
Canada Hot 100 (Billboard)	1
Canada AC (Billboard)	28
Canada CHR/Top 40 (Billboard)	1
Canada Hot AC (Billboard)	1
CIS Airplay (TopHit)	1
Croatia International Airplay (Top lista)	1
Czech Republic Airplay (ČNS IFPI)	2
Denmark (Tracklisten)	1
El Salvador Airplay (EFE)	1
European Hot 100 Singles (Billboard)	1
Finland (Suomen virallinen lista)	1
France (SNEP)	1
Germany (GfK)	1
Greece Digital Song Sales (Billboard)	2
Hungary (Rádiós Top 40)	5
Hungary (Single Top 40)	6
Hungary (Dance Top 40)	1
Ireland (IRMA)	1
Israel International Airplay (Media Forest)	2
Italy (FIMI)	2
Luxembourg Digital Song Sales (Billboard)	3
Mexico Anglo Airplay (Monitor Latino)	1
Mexico Ingles Airplay (Billboard)	1
Netherlands (Dutch Top 40)	1
Netherlands (Single Top 100)	1
New Zealand (Recorded Music NZ)	1
Norway (VG-lista)	1
Portugal Digital Song Sales (Billboard)	3
Romania Airplay (Romanian Top 100)	1
Russia Airplay (TopHit)	1
Scottish Singles Sales (Official Charts)	1
Slovakia Airplay (ČNS IFPI)	1
South Korea International (Gaon)	7
Spain (Promusicae)	2
Sweden (Sverigetopplistan)	1
Switzerland (Schweizer Hitparade)	1
Ukraine Airplay (TopHit)	2
UK Singles (Official Charts)	1
US Billboard Hot 100	1
US Adult Pop Airplay (Billboard)	12
US Dance Club Songs (Billboard)	1
US Dance Airplay (Billboard)	1
US Hot Latin Songs (Billboard)	24
US Hot R&B/Hip-Hop Songs (Billboard)	75
US Pop Airplay (Billboard)	1
US Rhythmic Airplay (Billboard)	5
Chart (2011)	Peak position
CIS Airplay (TopHit)	100
Russia Airplay (TopHit)	103
Ukraine Airplay (TopHit)	147
Chart (2012)	Peak position
CIS Airplay (TopHit)	41
Russia Airplay (TopHit)	35
Ukraine Airplay (TopHit)	138
Chart (2017)	Peak position
US Hot Dance/Electronic Songs (Billboard)	8
Chart (2020)	Peak position
Finland Airplay (Radiosoittolista)	77
Chart (2022)	Peak position
Ukraine Airplay (TopHit)	107
Chart (2024–2025)	Peak position
Brazil Hot 100 (Billboard)	22
CIS Airplay (TopHit)	178
Czech Republic Singles Digital (ČNS IFPI)	87
Finland Airplay (Radiosoittolista)	96
Global 200 (Billboard)	45
Greece International (IFPI)	54
Lithuania (AGATA)	93
Poland (Polish Airplay Top 100)	79
Portugal (AFP)	132
Romania Airplay (TopHit)	196
Singapore (RIAS)	12
Slovakia Singles Digital (ČNS IFPI)	89
Switzerland (Schweizer Hitparade)	100
Ukraine Airplay (TopHit)	158

=== Monthly charts ===
Monthly chart performance
Chart (2009)	Peak position
Brazil (Brasil Hot 100 Airplay)	18
Brazil (Brasil Hot Pop Songs)	10
CIS Airplay (TopHit)	1
Russia Airplay (TopHit)	1
Ukraine Airplay (TopHit)	5

=== Year-end charts ===
Year-end chart performance
Chart (2008)	Position
Australia (ARIA)	14
New Zealand (Recorded Music NZ)	6
Sweden (Sverigetopplistan)	62
Chart (2009)	Position
Australia (ARIA)	11
Austria (Ö3 Austria Top 40)	1
Belgium (Ultratop Flanders)	1
Belgium (Ultratop Wallonia)	1
Brazil (Crowley)	22
Canada (Canadian Hot 100)	2
CIS Airplay (TopHit)	14
Croatia International Airplay (HRT)	1
Denmark (Tracklisten)	2
European Hot 100 Singles (Billboard)	1
Finland (Suomen virallinen lista)	1
France (SNEP)	4
Germany (Media Control GfK)	1
Hungary (Dance Top 40)	7
Hungary (Rádiós Top 40)	9
Ireland (IRMA)	3
Italy (FIMI)	4
Japan (Japan Hot 100)	82
Japan Adult Contemporary (Billboard)	3
Netherlands (Dutch Top 40)	15
Netherlands (Single Top 100)	4
New Zealand (Recorded Music NZ)	15
Norway (VG-lista)	4
Romania (Romanian Top 100)	9
Russia Airplay (TopHit)	17
Spain (PROMUSICAE)	13
Sweden (Sverigetopplistan)	4
Switzerland (Schweizer Hitparade)	1
Taiwan (Yearly Singles Top 100)	3
Ukraine Airplay (TopHit)	9
UK Singles (Official Charts)	1
US Billboard Hot 100	2
US Adult Top 40 (Billboard)	39
US Dance Club Songs (Billboard)	16
US Dance/Mix Show Airplay (Billboard)	2
US Hot Latin Songs (Billboard)	67
US Pop Airplay (Billboard)	4
US Radio Songs (Billboard)	9
US Rhythmic Airplay (Billboard)	23
Worldwide (IFPI)	1
Chart (2010)	Position
Belgium (Ultratop Flanders)	67
Belgium (Ultratop Wallonia)	50
European Hot 100 Singles (Billboard)	92
Italy (FIMI)	95
Japan Digital Track Chart (RIAJ)	62
UK Singles (Official Charts)	151
Chart (2017)	Position
US Hot Dance/Electronic Songs (Billboard)	51
Chart (2025)	Position
Global 200 (Billboard)	119

=== Decade-end charts ===
Decade-end chart performance
Chart (2000–09)	Position
Australia (ARIA)	4
Austria (Ö3 Austria Top 40)	3
CIS Airplay (TopHit)	85
Germany (Official German Charts)	2
Russia Airplay (TopHit)	110
Ukraine Airplay (TopHit)	44
UK Singles (Official Charts Company)	15
US Billboard Hot 100	42

=== All-time charts ===
All-time chart performance
Chart	Position
UK Official Best-Selling Singles	94
US Billboard Hot 100 (Women)	86

== Certifications and sales ==
Certifications and sales
Region	Certification	Certified units/sales
Australia (ARIA)	15× Platinum	1,050,000^{‡}
Austria (IFPI Austria)	3× Platinum	90,000^{*}
Belgium (BRMA)	Platinum	
Brazil (Pro-Música Brasil)	Diamond	250,000^{‡}
Canada (Music Canada)	Diamond	800,000^{‡}
Denmark (IFPI Danmark)	3× Platinum	270,000^{‡}
Finland (Musiikkituottajat)	Platinum	14,227
France	—	300,000
Germany (BVMI)	4× Platinum	1,200,000^{‡}
Italy (FIMI)	2× Platinum	60,000^{*}
Japan (RIAJ) Full-length ringtone	Platinum	250,000^{*}
Japan (RIAJ) Full-length ringtone (LLG VS GLG Radio Mix)	Platinum	250,000^{*}
Japan (RIAJ) PC download	Platinum	250,000^{*}
New Zealand (RMNZ)	6× Platinum	180,000^{‡}
Norway (IFPI Norway)	4× Platinum	240,000^{‡}
South Korea	—	1,304,202
Spain (Promusicae)	2× Platinum	80,000^{*}
Spain (Promusicae) Since 2015	Platinum	60,000^{‡}
Sweden (GLF)	2× Platinum	40,000^{^}
Switzerland (IFPI Switzerland)	3× Platinum	90,000^{^}
United Kingdom (BPI)	4× Platinum	2,400,000
United States (RIAA)	Diamond	10,000,000^{‡}
Streaming
Greece (IFPI Greece)	2× Platinum	4,000,000^{†}
^{*} Sales figures based on certification alone.^{^} Shipments figures based on certification alone.^{‡} Sales+streaming figures based on certification alone.^{†} Streaming-only figures based on certification alone.

== Release history ==
Release dates and formats
Region	Date	Format	Version(s)	Label(s)	Ref.
Various	September 23, 2008	Digital download	Original	Cherrytree; Interscope; KonLive; Streamline	
Australia	October 25, 2008	CD single	Original	Interscope	
Italy	October 31, 2008	Radio airplay	Original	Universal	
Various	December 16, 2008	Digital EP	Remixes	Interscope	
France	December 22, 2008	Digital EP	Remixes	Interscope	
France	January 23, 2009	Digital EP	Original; remixes	Interscope	
France	January 26, 2009	CD single	Original; remixes	Polydor	
United States	January 27, 2009	Contemporary hit radio	Original	Interscope	
Germany	February 20, 2009	CD single	Original	Interscope	
Germany	February 20, 2009	Digital EP	Original; Space Cowboy remix	Interscope	
Germany	February 24, 2009	Maxi single	Original; Space Cowboy remix	Interscope	
United States	March 10, 2009	CD single	Remixes	Cherrytree; Interscope; KonLive; Streamline	
United Kingdom	April 9, 2009	Digital EP	Original; remixes	Interscope	
United Kingdom	April 13, 2009	7-inch single	Original; Space Cowboy remix	Polydor	
United Kingdom	April 13, 2009	CD single	Original	Polydor	
Germany	June 3, 2009	Digital EP	Remixes	Interscope	
Canada	June 23, 2009	Digital download	Medley Live at MMVA 2009 ("LoveGame" / "Poker Face")	Interscope	
Various	February 1, 2010	Digital download	Live from the 52nd Annual Grammy Awards ("Poker Face" / "Speechless" / "Your Song")	Universal	
Poland	April 24, 2010	Digital download	Piano & Voice version	Universal	

== See also ==
- List of best-selling singles
- List of best-selling singles in the United States
- List of best-selling singles in Australia
- List of million-selling singles in the United Kingdom
- List of Dutch Top 40 number-one singles of 2009
- List of European number-one hits of 2009
- List of Hot 100 number-one singles of 2008 (Canada)
- List of Hot 100 number-one singles of 2009 (U.S.)
- List of number-one dance airplay hits of 2009 (U.S.)
- List of number-one dance singles of 2009 (U.S.)
- List of number-one singles in Australia in 2008
- List of number-one singles in Australia in 2009
- List of number-one hits of 2009 (Austria)
- List of number-one hits in Denmark
- List of number-one hits of 2009 (France)
- List of number-one hits of 2009 (Germany)
- List of number-one singles from the 2000s (New Zealand)
- List of number-one hits of 2009 (Sweden)
- List of number-one hits of 2009 (Switzerland)
- List of number-one singles from the 2000s (UK)
- List of Romanian Top 100 number ones of the 2000s
- List of Ultratop 40 number-one singles of 2009
- List of Ultratop 50 number-one singles of 2009
