= Fame Kills: Starring Kanye West and Lady Gaga =

Canceled 2009–10 concert tour by Kanye West and Lady Gaga

- Tour by Kanye West and Lady Gaga
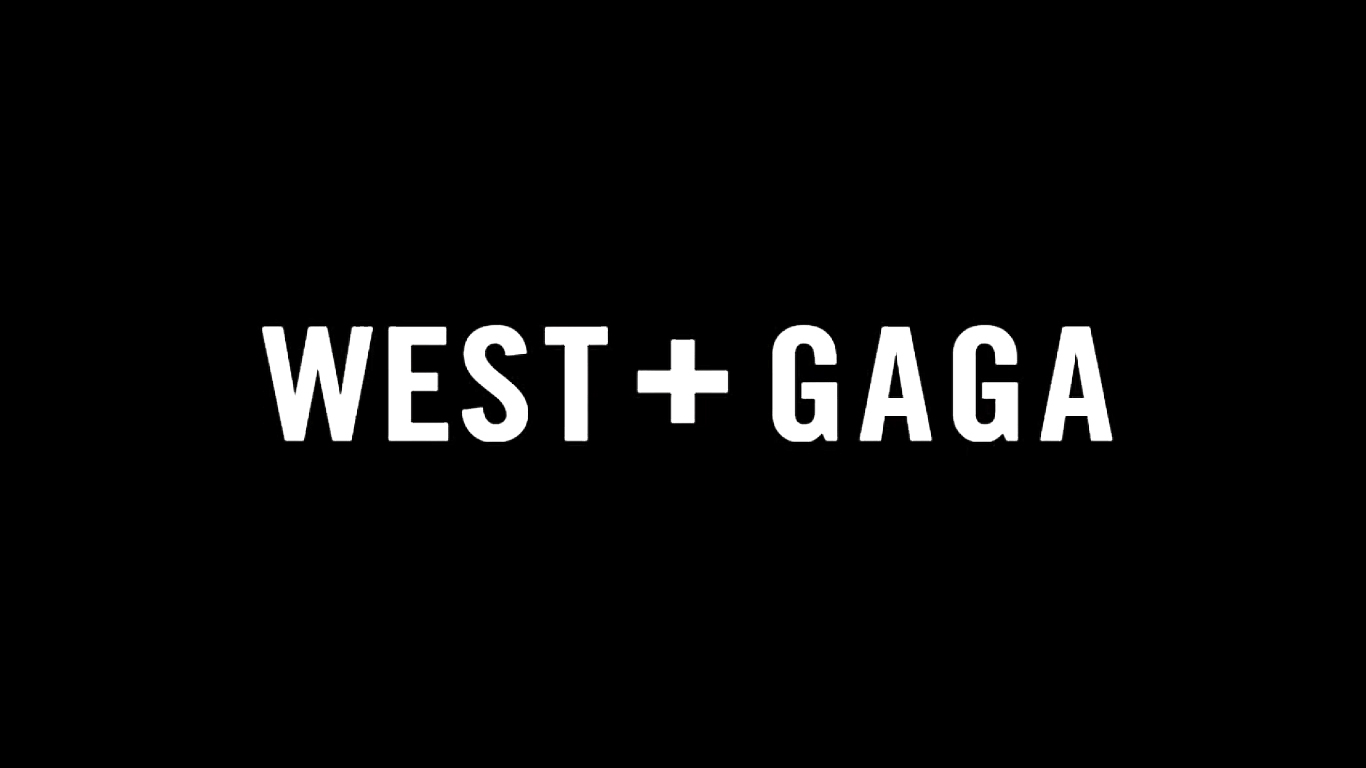
- Title card of the tour
- Associated albums: 808s & Heartbreak; The Fame Monster
- Start date: November 10, 2009
- End date: January 24, 2010
- Legs: 1
- No. of shows: 34 scheduled
Kanye West tour chronology
Glow in the Dark Tour (2007–2008)	Fame Kills (2009–2010; canceled)	Watch the Throne Tour (2011–2012)
Lady Gaga tour chronology
The Fame Ball Tour (2009)	Fame Kills (2009–2010; canceled)	The Monster Ball Tour (2009–2011)

Fame Kills: Starring Kanye West and Lady Gaga was a planned co-headlining concert tour by American rapper Kanye West and singer Lady Gaga. For the tour, which would have supported West's fourth album 808s & Heartbreak (2008) and Gaga's The Fame Monster EP (2009), the pair conceived a production that would unite their different musical audiences. The tour was scheduled to run from November 2009 to January 2010, but was canceled after public controversy regarding West's interruption of Taylor Swift's Best Female Video speech at the 2009 MTV Video Music Awards. Shortly after the cancellation, Gaga embarked on her own tour, The Monster Ball Tour, while West went on to make his album My Beautiful Dark Twisted Fantasy, released on November 22, 2010.

== Background and development ==
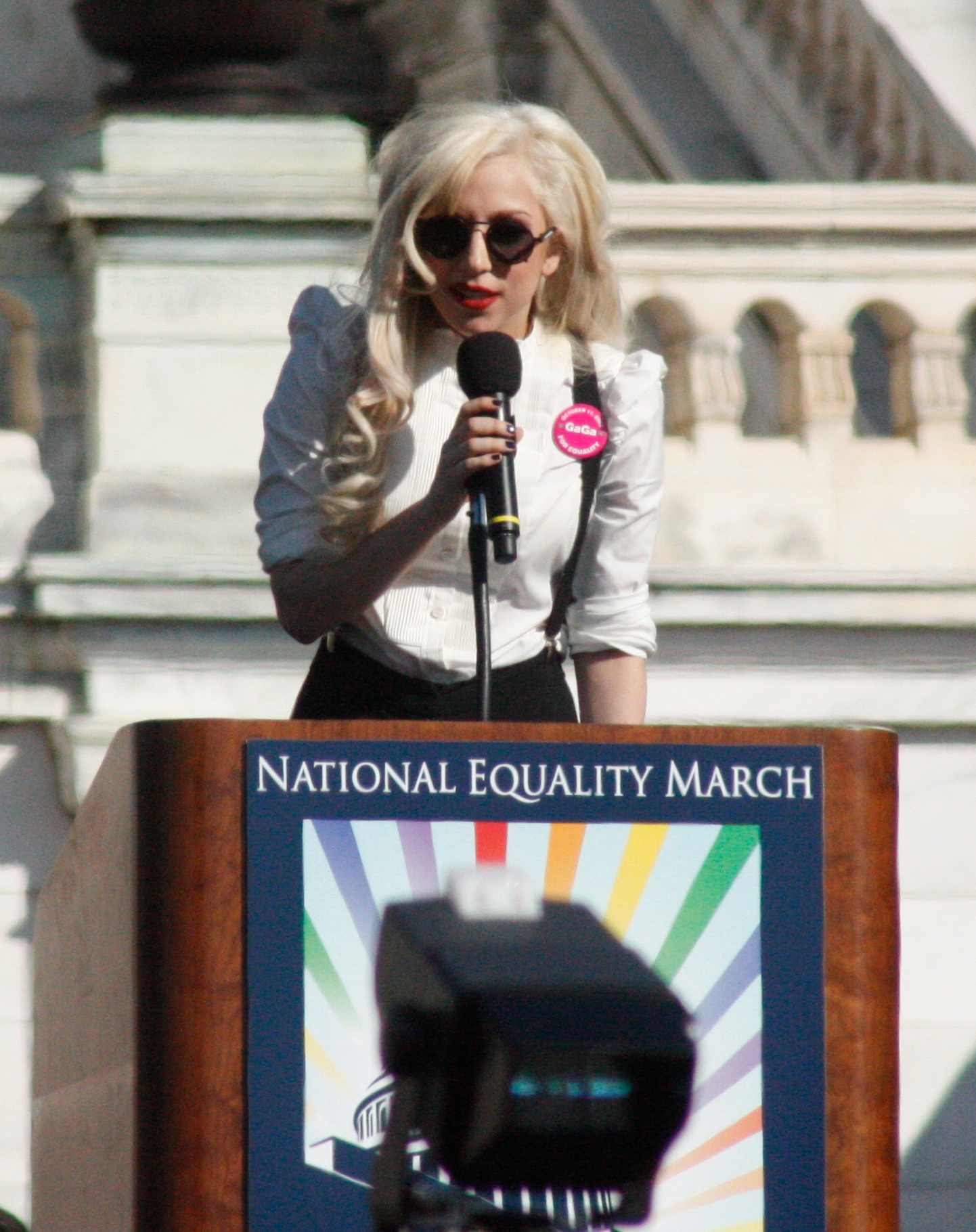
Gaga only agreed to tour with West under the condition that everything "remain gay".

In June 2009, Kanye West announced on The View he would be touring with Lady Gaga, but she would not perform as an opening act. "She's talented and so incredible that she's not an opening act", he said. "We're doing it together, with no opening act." In August, Gaga expressed her belief that the tour would be "one of the most groundbreaking moments in touring history." Before the singer agreed to collaborate with West, she demanded that the tour would remain accessible to her gay fans. "I'm gay", she recalled telling West in an interview with Out magazine, "my music is gay. My show is gay. And I love that it's gay. And I love my gay fans and they're all going to be coming to our show. And it's going to remain gay."

The tour's stage was designed by Gaga and West as a traverse; "Instead of being on just one end of the arena, the stage traverses the entire arena", Gaga noted. "It's not really in-the-round; it's more of a runway." The concept of the tour was to feature the performers on opposite ends of the stage, with Gaga's end representing "home and humble beginnings" and West's end representing "the fame", with the two fighting for each other's positions throughout the show. West would perform his singles, Gaga would perform hers, and then the duo would perform several duets.

Gaga said she enjoyed designing Fame Kills with West, calling themselves "creative kindreds." She explained that they did not plan to tour for themselves, but rather for "everybody else"; the goal of the tour would have been to bring two different groups of fans and music enthusiasts together. "I make pop music and Kanye's fans love pop music because he has changed what hip-hop means", she said. "For me, the tour is more about just bringing people together and having a big dance party. The show is a celebration of creativity, art, fashion and choreography." She also noted that West showed her a lot during the creative planning of the show, such as one instance where Gaga wanted to put side panels on the stage that would have obstructed the view for some fans. "He was like, 'I'm not selling a ticket to a fan who can't see the show,' and he's right", she said.

A promotional video for the tour was released in September 2009. West posted the video on his blog accompanied by the text, "What happened to all the rock stars? The fame killed them!" The 30-second clip features slow-motion footage of a topless Gaga being carried by a man presumed to be West. Daniel Kreps from Rolling Stone described it as "soft 70s porn", while adding that he had "no idea what [the text in the video] has to do with the 30-second clip, but we're sure it'll start to make more sense as more promos roll out as we approach the tour's launch." At Gaga's Fame Ball tour, she sang a short piano version of West's "Heartless".

== Cancellation ==
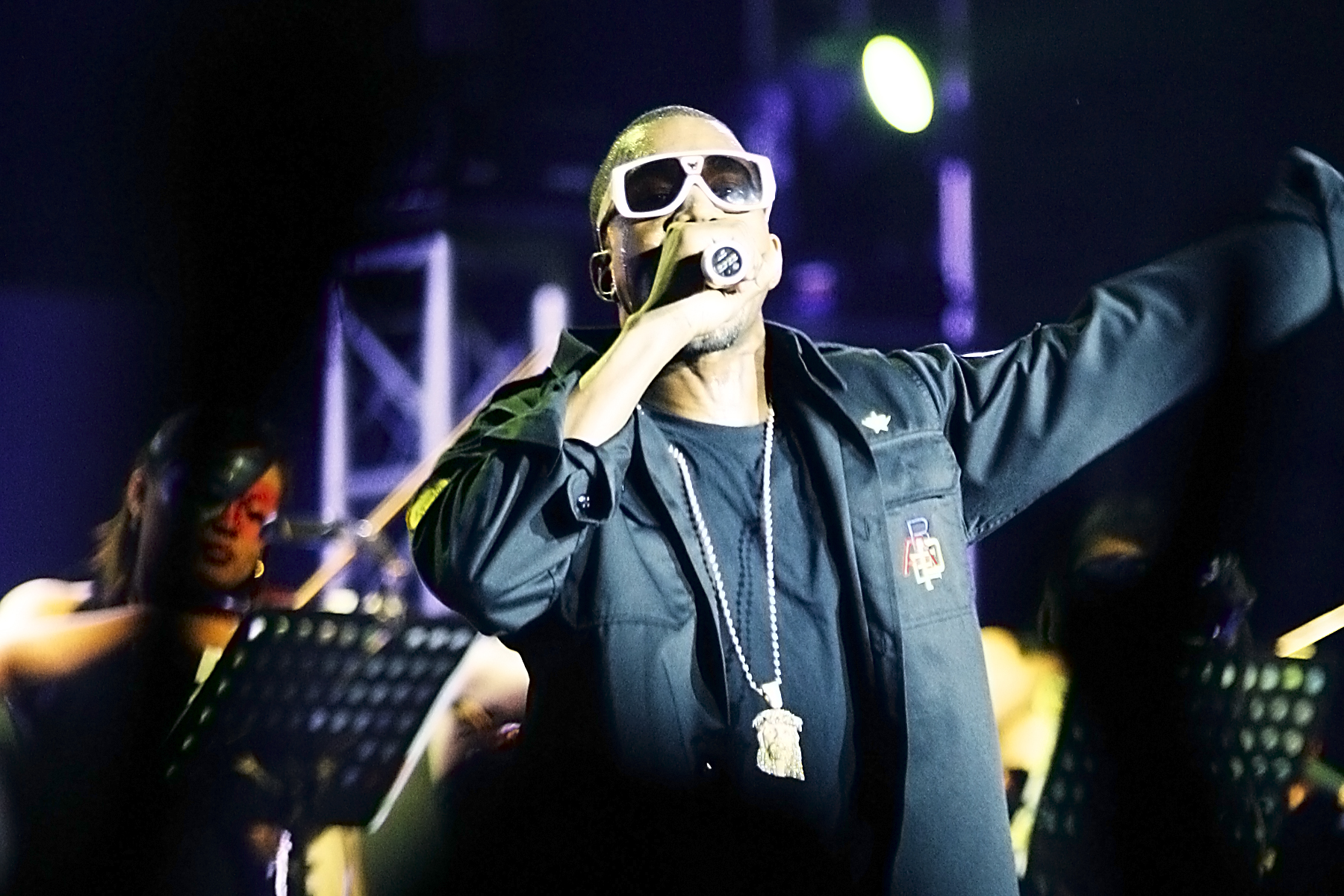
West (pictured) was criticized for his interruption of Taylor Swift's VMA speech. The incident reportedly put the fate of the Fame Kills tour in question.

Following singer Taylor Swift's win for the music video "You Belong with Me" at the 2009 MTV Video Music Awards for Best Female Video, West stormed the stage, grabbed Swift's microphone, and declared that singer Beyoncé deserved the award for her "Single Ladies (Put a Ring on It)" video. He declared, "Yo, Taylor, I'm really happy for you, I'mma let you finish, but Beyoncé had one of the best videos of all time!" West was profusely criticized by celebrities and fans alike over the incident. Following the interruption, the status of Fame Kills was rumored to be in question. A representative from a US urban radio station commented: "I think this could potentially affect his upcoming tour with Lady Gaga. This isn't an urban tour — urban audiences can be a bit more forgiving than mainstream audiences are. I can see him going on stage and people booing him. It's unfortunate." Less than a week after the ticket sales began, the tour was canceled but no reason was given.

Various rumors circulated as to why the tour was canceled. It was suspected that it was canceled due to poor ticket sales, feuding between Gaga and West's management teams, and Gaga's desire to play in smaller venues. Gaga's choreographer, Laurieann Gibson, said the tour was terminated due to "creative differences" between the singers. Gaga claimed that the cancellation was a mutual decision, and added that she would soon embark on her own headlining tour The Monster Ball Tour in the coming weeks, while West would be taking a break from his career. In contrast, West claimed in 2016 that Gaga had made the decision to cancel the tour following the fallout from his MTV VMAs incident.

Gaga was scheduled to begin The Monster Ball Tour in March 2010, but following the cancellation of Fame Kills, The Monster Ball Tour began in November 2009. Gaga said that while she was inspired by what she and West had planned to do with the Fame Kills tour, she decided not to use any of the ideas and concepts they created together, citing integrity.

== Scheduled tour dates ==
All tour dates were canceled.

List of concerts, showing date, city, country and venue
Date	City	Country	Venue
November 10, 2009	Phoenix	United States	US Airways Center
November 11, 2009	San Diego	United States	San Diego Sports Arena
November 13, 2009	Las Vegas	United States	Mandalay Bay Events Center
November 15, 2009	Anaheim	United States	Honda Center
November 16, 2009	Los Angeles	United States	Staples Center
November 18, 2009	Sacramento	United States	ARCO Arena
November 19, 2009	San Jose	United States	HP Pavilion at San Jose
November 24, 2009	Vancouver	Canada	General Motors Place
November 26, 2009	Calgary	Canada	Pengrowth Saddledome
November 28, 2009	Edmonton	Canada	Rexall Place
November 29, 2009	Saskatoon	Canada	Credit Union Centre
December 2, 2009	Denver	United States	Pepsi Center
December 4, 2009	St. Louis	United States	Scottrade Center
December 9, 2009	Miami	United States	American Airlines Arena
December 11, 2009	Atlanta	United States	Philips Arena
December 12, 2009	Greensboro	United States	Greensboro Coliseum
December 13, 2009	Norfolk	United States	Norfolk Scope
December 16, 2009	Worcester	United States	DCU Center
December 18, 2009	Philadelphia	United States	Wachovia Center
December 19, 2009	Baltimore	United States	1st Mariner Arena
December 20, 2009	Buffalo	United States	HSBC Arena
December 22, 2009	East Rutherford	United States	Izod Center
December 26, 2009	Hartford	United States	XL Center
December 30, 2009	Washington, D.C.	United States	Verizon Center
January 3, 2010	Uniondale	United States	Nassau Veterans Memorial Coliseum
January 6, 2010	Toronto	Canada	Air Canada Centre
January 8, 2010	Ottawa	Canada	Scotiabank Place
January 11, 2010	Montreal	Canada	Bell Centre
January 14, 2010	Auburn Hills	United States	The Palace of Auburn Hills
January 16, 2010	Chicago	United States	United Center
January 19, 2010	New Orleans	United States	New Orleans Arena
January 21, 2010	San Antonio	United States	AT&T Center
January 22, 2010	Houston	United States	Toyota Center
January 24, 2010	Dallas	United States	American Airlines Center
