= Space Cowboy discography =

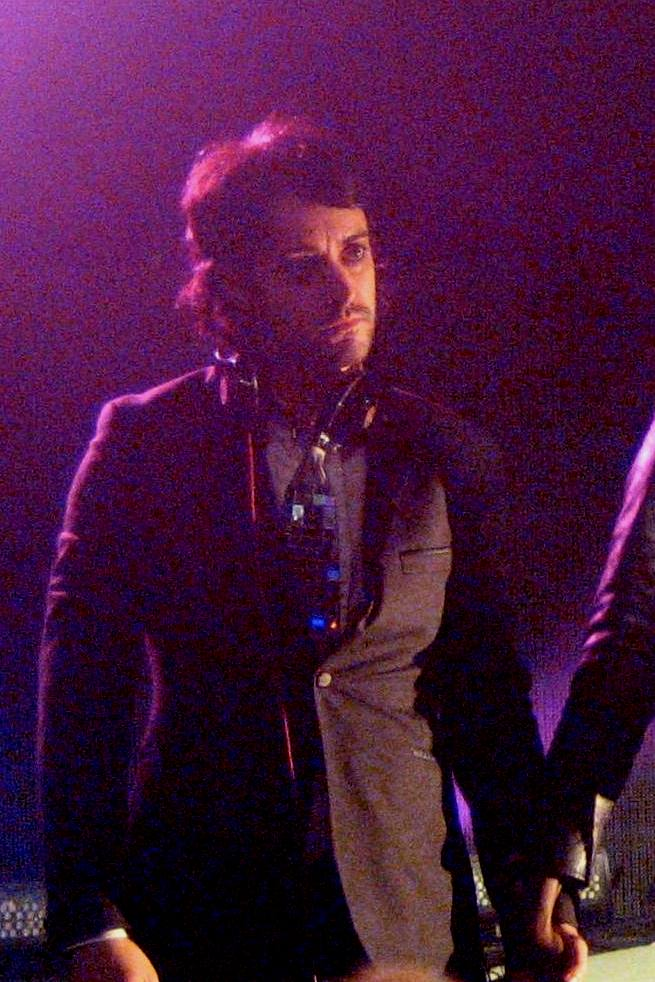
- Studio albums: 4
- Extended plays: 2
- Compilation albums: 1
- Singles: 5
- Music videos: 1

Space Cowboy is a French-British DJ and producer. He has released four studio albums, two extended plays, five singles, and one music video.

Space Cowboy released his first official single, a cover of Prince's song, "I Would Die 4 U" on 1 January 2002. The single peaked at number 55 on the UK Singles Chart. This was the only single from his first album, Across the Sky that was released on 3 November 2003 though Southern Fried Records and Epic Japan. Then another single was released, "Just Put Your Hand in Mine", on 21 July 2003. This song peaked on the UK Singles Chart at number 71. His second album, released through Sony Music Entertainment Japan and Epic Japan, Big City Nights was released on 22 June 2005. His third studio album, Digital Rock was released on 19 July 2006 though Sony and Tiger Trax. Space Cowboy's third, fourth, and fifth singles, "My Egyptian Lover", "Falling Down", and "I Came 2 Party", was released throughout 2009 to debut his fourth studio album, Digital Rock Star that was released on 20 October 2009 by Universal Music Group, Cherrytree Records, Interscope Records, and Tiger Trax. In 2010, Electro Pioneers (Interscope, Tiger Trax), the second extended play, was released on 12 January 2010.

Space Cowboy is known to be the DJ for Lady Gaga. He was featured on and co-produced "Starstruck" for her album The Fame. The two also collaborated on the promotional single "Christmas Tree". He also remixed some of Lady Gaga's songs, including "Just Dance", "LoveGame", and "Poker Face". He also worked with her on her second album The Fame Monster, co-writing and producing the tracks "Monster" and "So Happy I Could Die" with Lady Gaga and RedOne. Space Cowboy appeared in the Lady Gaga music videos for "Just Dance", "Beautiful, Dirty, Rich", and "Poker Face".

He also produced two albums by Nadia Oh, Hot Like Wow and Colours.

He also co-wrote the MSTRKRFT song "Heartbreaker" featuring American singer John Legend.

== Albums ==
=== Studio albums ===
Title	Album details
Across the Sky	Released: 3 November 2003; Label: Southern Fried, Epic; Format: CD, digital download
Big City Nights	Released: 22 June 2005; Label: Sony, Epic; Format: CD, digital download
Digital Rock	Released: 19 July 2006; Label: Sony, Tiger Trax; Format: CD, digital download
Digital Rock Star	Released: 20 October 2009; Label: Universal Music, Cherrytree, Interscope, Tiger Trax; Format: CD, digital download

=== Compilation albums ===
Year	Album details
Space Cowboy: The Collection	Released: 22 November 2010; Label: Southern Fried; Format: Digital download

== Extended plays ==
Title	EP details
Falling Down Remix	Released: 25 August 2009; Label: Cherrytree; Format: Digital download
Electro Pioneers	Released: 12 January 2010; Label: Interscope, Tiger Trax; Format: Digital download

== Singles ==
Year	Single	Peak chart positions				Album
Year	Single	UK	AUT	GER	SWE	Album
2002	"I Would Die 4 U"	55	—	—	—	Across the Sky
2003	"Just Put Your Hand in Mine"	71	—	—	—	Across the Sky
2009	"My Egyptian Lover"	45	—	—	—	Digital Rock
2009	"Falling Down"	—	—	63	27	Digital Rock Star
2009	"I Came 2 Party"	—	71	32	—	Digital Rock Star
"—" denotes a release that did not chart.

== Production discography ==
Also contains co-productions and co-writes

=== Albums ===
Year	Album	Artist	Release date
2008	Hot Like Wow	Nadia Oh	13 April 2008
2011	Colours	Nadia Oh	8 May 2011

=== Songs ===
Year	Song	Artist	Album
2008	"Starstruck"	Lady Gaga	The Fame
2008	"Christmas Tree"	Lady Gaga	Christmas Tree
2009	"Heartbreaker" (featuring John Legend)	MSTRKRFT	Fist of God
2009	"Monster"	Lady Gaga	The Fame Monster
2009	"So Happy I Could Die"	Lady Gaga	The Fame Monster
2009	"Earthquake"	Lady Gaga	—
2009	"Bubblegum"	Valeria	Freshly Squeezed
2009	"Lights Camera Action"	Valeria	Freshly Squeezed
2009	"Hot 4 U"	Valeria	Freshly Squeezed
2011	"All Around the World"	Mac Miller	Best Day Ever
2011	"All Fired Up"	The Saturdays	On Your Radar
2011	"Get Ready, Get Set"	The Saturdays	On Your Radar
2011	"No I.D."	Frankmusik featuring Colette Carr	Do It in the AM
2012	"Slapper (Ayye)"	Nadia Oh	—
2013	"Tube Stops and Lonely Hearts"	Annie	—
2013	"Tunnel Vision"	Nenna Yvonne	The Evolution of Blue Magic

== Remixes ==
Year	Song	Artist	Album
2005	"Around the World"	Ami Suzuki	Amix World
2006	"Girlfriend"	The Darkness	Girlfriend
2006	"Cherry Girl"	Koda Kumi	Cherry Girl
2007	"Glamorous"	Fergie	The Dutchess
2007	"Heart Shaped Glasses"	Marilyn Manson	Eat Me, Drink Me
2008	"Starstruck"	Lady Gaga	—
2008	"Just Dance"	Lady Gaga	The Remix
2008	"LoveGame"	Lady Gaga	The Remix
2009	"Poker Face"	Lady Gaga	The Remix
2009	"Monster"	Lady Gaga	—
2009	"Astronauta"	Jery Sandoval	—
2009	"2 in the Morning"	New Kids on the Block	The Block
2010	"Do You Think About Me"	50 Cent	Do You Think About Me
2010	"Nada De Más"	Belanova	Sueño Electro I
2010	"Fresh Out the Oven" (featuring Pitbull)	Jennifer Lopez	Fresh Out the Oven
2010	"Louboutins"	Jennifer Lopez	—
2011	"Addicted"	Mister Chase	—
2011	"All Fired Up"	The Saturdays	All Fired Up
2012	"Bounce"	DJ DLG	Bounce
2012	"All In"	Elixia	Secret Me
2012	"Better Than a BMX"	Hervé	Better Than a BMX
2014	"If You Wanna Console Me..."	Yoon Sang	If You Wanna Console Me...

== Music videos ==
Year	Title	Director
2008	"Just Dance" (featuring Colby O'Donis)	Melina Matsoukas
2008	"Beautiful, Dirty, Rich" (Lady Gaga)	Melina Matsoukas
2008	"Poker Face" (Lady Gaga)	Ray Kay
2009	"Falling Down" (featuring Chelsea Korka)	Good Fellas
2009	"Patron Tequila" (The Paradiso Girls featuring Lil Jon and Eve)	Ray Kay
2009	"I Came 2 Party" (Cinema Bizarre featuring Space Cowboy)	Lennart Brede
