= Chantelle Paige =

American singer

- Born: Chantelle Paige Soutas; February 3, 1988 (age 38)
- Origin: San Francisco, California U.S.
- Genres: Pop
- Occupations: Singer, influencer, entrepreneur
- Years active: 2005–present
- Label: Interscope Records
- Formerly of: Flipsyde

Chantelle Paige Mulligan (née Soutas), known professionally as Chantelle Paige, is an American singer. She is a former member of the R&B/rap group Flipsyde, signed to Interscope Records.

Chantelle is a content creator and founder of Senna Case, a line of gender neutral kids apparel with matching elements for adults.

== Early life ==
Chantelle was born in Los Gatos, California to Michael and Deborah Soutas. Chantelle was home schooled in grade school and attended Valley Christian High School (San Jose, California). Chantelle moved to Los Angeles after graduating high school when she signed with Interscope Records. She has a brother, Austin Soutas, and a sister, Savannah Rose LaBrant, who is a popular YouTuber.

== Music career ==
At the age of 17, Chantelle posted a track on MySpace that became a top played song on the site overnight. Due to her continued MySpace popularity as an unsigned artist, she opened for The Pussycat Dolls, Robin Thicke, Pretty Ricky, Tommy Lee and Bobby Valentino. At the age of 19, Paige was signed to Interscope/Cherrytree Records by Martin Kierszenbaum. She was added to Flipsyde; the group recorded State of Survival, and made two music videos ("When It Was Good" and "A Change")). A track from the State of Survival album, "Champion", was chosen as a theme song for the 2008 Summer Olympics in Beijing, China, as well as the primary song for EA Sports NBA Live 09 video game. In 2009, Flipsyde made a cameo in Lady Gaga's "Just Dance" music video, and Chantelle was featured as the love interest in the music video "I Wanna Touch You" (Colby O'Donis). As a member of Flipsdye, Chantelle toured in Europe with Sarah Connor and shared the stage in America with Akon, Ciara, N.E.R.D., Kevin Rudolf, T.I., and Ludacris. After the group went on hiatus, Chantelle continued as a solo artist, and in 2009 she recorded the song "Devastated" with Space Cowboy and Martin Kierszenbaum (Cherry Cherry Boom Boom). Chantelle performed the song with Space Cowboy as an opening act for LMFAO and Far East Movement on the Party Rock Tour.

== Personal life ==
She currently resides in San Francisco with her husband Coulter Mulligan and their two children Senna and Case Mulligan. She is most recently known for her gender neutral clothing line aka SennaCase, Instagram modeling, and being an influencer.

== Discography ==
- State of Survival (FLIPSYDE)

=== EPs ===
- Like This (2005)
- The Beautiful Minds (2010)
- Getaway (2018)
