= Digital Rock Star =

Studio album by Space Cowboy
- Released: 20 October 2009
- Genre: Electronic, dance, house, pop
- Length: 37:28
- Label: Cherrytree, Interscope, Tiger Trax
- Producer: Space Cowboy, Martin "Cherry Cherry Boom Boom" Kierszenbaum, RedOne

Space Cowboy chronology
Falling Down Remix (2009)	Digital Rock Star (2009)	Electro Pioneers (2010)

Singles from Digital Rock Star
- 1. "Falling Down" Released: 15 May 2009; 2. "I Came 2 Party" Released: 7 August 2009

Digital Rock Star is the fourth studio album by French-English recording artist Space Cowboy. It was released in the United States on 26 October 2009 by Cherrytree Records.

== Singles ==
In April 2009, a new song by Space Cowboy and Chelsea Korka from the Paradiso Girls, entitled "Falling Down", leaked onto the Internet. The song, as announced in the intro, was produced by RedOne. The video, directed by Good Fellas, premiered soon afterwards. The song was also played in a scene of the 2009 Walt Disney Pictures film G-Force. The physical single was released on 15 May 2009.

The album's second single, "I Came 2 Party", a collaboration with the German band Cinema Bizarre, was released on 7 August 2009. The song is also included on the band's second studio album ToyZ and their debut US album, BANG!. On his work with the band, Space Cowboy stated: "It's a pretty awesome time for people experimenting; we just did a song with a band called Cinema Bizarre, who are from Germany. The song's very glam-rock but with a synth-pop style and we just shot the video for it in a German country house."

== Track listing ==
No.	Title	Writer(s)	Producer(s)	Length
1.	"Just Play That Track" (featuring Natalia Kills)	Nick Dresti	Space Cowboy	0:48
2.	"Falling Down" (featuring Chelsea from the Paradiso Girls)	Dresti, Martin Kierszenbaum, Nadir Khayat	Space Cowboy, RedOne, Cherry Cherry Boom Boom	2:57
3.	"I Came 2 Party" (Cinema Bizarre featuring Space Cowboy)	Dresti, Kierszenbaum, Khayat	Space Cowboy, RedOne, Cherry Cherry Boom Boom	3:26
4.	"Boyfriends Hate Me"	Dresti, Kierszenbaum, Khayat, Savan Kotecha	RedOne	4:18
5.	"Devastated" (featuring Chantelle Paige and Cherry Cherry Boom Boom)	Dresti, Kierszenbaum	Space Cowboy	4:11
6.	"Invisible"	Dresti, Kierszenbaum	Space Cowboy	3:05
7.	"Party Like Animal" (featuring Kee and Vistoso Bosses)	Dresti, Khayat, Kinnda Hamid	RedOne	3:56
8.	"Talking in Your Sleep" (New Version)	Dresti, Kevin Rudolf	Space Cowboy	2:45
9.	"I'ma Be Alright (Rent Money)"	Dresti, Khayat, Novel Jannusi, Bilal Hajji	RedOne	3:24
10.	"I Want You Back"	Dresti	Space Cowboy	2:39
11.	"My Egyptian Lover" (New Version) (featuring Nadia Oh)	Dresti	Space Cowboy	2:52
12.	"Falling Down" (Party Rock Remix) (featuring Chelsea from the Paradiso Girls and LMFAO)	Dresti, Kierszenbaum, Khayat	Space Cowboy, RedOne, Cherry Cherry Boom Boom	3:03
Total length:				37:24

US iTunes bonus tracks
No.	Title	Writer(s)	Producer(s)	Length
13.	"Falling Down" (Stereotypes Remix) (featuring Far East Movement)	Dresti, Kierszenbaum, Khayat, Jonathon Yip, Roy Romulus & Jeremy Reeves	Space Cowboy, RedOne, Cherry Cherry Boom Boom (remix and additional production by Stereotypes)	2:58
Total length:				40:19

German bonus tracks
No.	Title	Length
13.	"Never Again"	2:53
Total length:		40:17

Japanese bonus tracks
No.	Title	Writer(s)	Producer(s)	Length
13.	"Falling Down" (Stereotypes Remix) (featuring Far East Movement)	Dresti, Kierszenbaum, Khayat	Space Cowboy, RedOne, Cherry Cherry Boom Boom	2:58
14.	"Never Again"			2:53
Total length:				43:15

== Release history ==
Country	Date	Label	Format
Germany	20 October 2009	Universal Music	CD, digital download
Japan	21 October 2009	Universal Music	CD, digital download
United States	26 October 2009	Cherrytree, Interscope, Tiger Trax	CD, digital download
