= Big City Nights =

Big City Nights may refer to:

- "Big City Nights" (song), a 1984 song by the German heavy metal band Scorpions
- Big City Nights (Scorpions album), 1998
- Big City Nights (Space Cowboy album), 2005
- Big City Nights, the title of the music video for Daft Punk's song Da Funk
