= No Bueno =

Single by Nadia Oh

from the album Colours
- Released: 4 September 2011
- Recorded: 2011; London, England
- Genre: Moombahton
- Length: 4:40
- Label: Tiger Trax
- Songwriter: Space Cowboy
- Producer: Space Cowboy

Nadia Oh singles chronology
"Taking Over The Dancefloor " (2011)	"No Bueno" (2011)	"Slapper (Ayye)" (2012)

"No Bueno" is the second single from British singer Nadia Oh's second studio album, Colours (2011). It was written and produced by Space Cowboy and has been noted for popularizing the Dave Nada-created genre Moombahton.

== Music video ==
The video premiered on August 1, 2011 and featured the censored edit of the song however the video only lasts 1 minute and 48 seconds long. The video sees Oh in front of numerous colour-changing screens donning white shirts with several slogans from past singles such as: "Taking Over the Dancefloor", "Hot Like Wow", and "N.A.D.I.A. O.H.".

== Reception ==
PopJustice featured the single as their "Song of the Day" saying:

"Several things about this song - for example the not exactly half-hearted use of Auto Tune - are fucking awful but the popmoombahton epic stands its ground with the fantastic pop chorus."

== Release ==
"No Bueno" was also released as a digital EP, featuring remixes by DJ DLG, SAiNT and Cory Martin, "who opts for a crowd-pleasing pop-dance vibe."

=== Track listing ===
No Bueno (Remixes) - EP

1. "No Bueno (Radio Edit)" – 3:09
2. "No Bueno (Original)" – 4:40
3. "No Bueno (DJ DLG Remix)" – 5:24
4. "No Bueno (SAiNT Remix)" – 4:31
5. "No Bueno (Cory Martin Remix)" – 4:37
