= Electro Pioneers =

EP by Space Cowboy
- Released: 12 January 2010
- Length: 12:16
- Label: Interscope; Tiger Trax
- Producer: Space Cowboy

Space Cowboy chronology
Digital Rock Star (2009)	Electro Pioneers (2010)	Space Cowboy: The Collection (2010)

Electro Pioneers is the second EP by the electronic artist Space Cowboy. It contains remixes of the songs "My Egyptian Lover", "Falling Down", and "Devastated". It was released by Tiger Trax Records through Interscope Records on 12 January 2010.

== Track listing ==
Electro Pioneers track listing
No.	Title	Length
1.	"Devastated" (Howard Jones Remix)	3:28
2.	"My Egyptian Lover" (Thomas Dolby Remix)	3:34
3.	"Falling Down" (Vince Clark Remix)	5:14
Total length:		12:16
