= Christmas Tree (Lady Gaga song) =

Promotional single by Lady Gaga featuring Space Cowboy
- Released: December 16, 2008
- Studio: Cherrytree Recording Studios
- Genre: Christmas; dance-pop; synthpop
- Length: 2:26
- Label: Streamline; Kon Live; Cherrytree; Interscope
- Songwriters: Lady Gaga; Nick Dresti; Martin Kierszenbaum
- Producers: Space Cowboy; Martin Kierszenbaum

Audio video
- "Christmas Tree" on YouTube

"Christmas Tree" is a song by American singer Lady Gaga. It was released on December 16, 2008, for digital download. Gaga wrote the song with its producers Space Cowboy and Martin Kierszenbaum, with the former being credited as a featured artist due to also providing vocals. Musically, "Christmas Tree" is a Christmas song with dance-pop and synthpop influences. It samples the classic Christmas song "Deck the Halls", as well as briefly using the lyrics "Rum pum pum pum" from the Christmas song "The Little Drummer Boy" in its intro. Lyrically, the song uses sexual innuendos.

The song received mixed reviews from music critics, with some commending its creativity and individuality from other Christmas songs and others criticizing its sexual innuendos and deeming it "not for the family". Due to digital downloads, "Christmas Tree" reached number 79 on the Canadian Hot 100 chart in January 2009. It also reached number 18 on the Japanese RIAJ Digital Track Chart and number 15 on the Billboard Holiday Digital Song Sales chart in the United States in January 2011. In December 2009, it was available for free download on Amazon as part of the site's "25 Days of Free" promotion.

== Background ==
"Christmas Tree" is a Christmas music-themed song, featuring vocals from Gaga and Space Cowboy. It was written and produced by Gaga, Space Cowboy and Martin Kierszenbaum. Space Cowboy and Gaga were introduced in Los Angeles by Martin Kierszenbaum, the head of Gaga's label, Cherrytree Records, an imprint of Interscope Records. Kierszenbaum recommended a collaboration between them after hearing Space Cowboy's single "My Egyptian Lover", released in January 2007 and featuring vocalist Nadia Oh. Kierszenbaum contacted Space Cowboy during December 2007 and Space Cowboy first spoke to Gaga by phone on New Year's Eve, "[getting] along so well right away" talking about sequins, disco balls, Prince, David Bowie and body paint. The pair worked together in Los Angeles to create "Christmas Tree" and "Starstruck", a song from revised editions of Lady Gaga's then-current album The Fame. Space Cowboy commented of working with Lady Gaga:

We figured out that we shared pretty much the same experiences; we'd been doing similar things on opposite sides of the Atlantic. Then I got invited to the studio to write some songs with Lady Gaga; we did "Starstruck", we did a song called "Christmas Tree" She's super-creative, she's amazing — the best writer I'd ever seen, and best performer.

— Space Cowboy, A Space Cowboy Odyssey, interview with URB.

== Composition ==
'Christmas Tree'
A 14-second sample from "Christmas Tree", which repeats the lines "Light me up, put me on top/Let's fa-la-la-la-la-la-la-la-la".

"Christmas Tree" is a version of the traditional Christmas song "Deck the Halls", with the same melody but with lyrics changed to be sexually suggestive, with many sexual innuendos and metaphors. Lyrically, the song is "lewdly celebratory" with lines such as "Light me up put me on top/ Let's fa-la-la-la-la-, la-la, la, la". In an analysis by Stelios Phili of the Washington Square News, Phili jokes that the meaning of the song is closer to the original version of "Deck the Halls", a Welsh folk song called "Nos Galan" (Welsh for "New Year's Eve") traditionally sung at New Year's Eve, than the English Christmas version. He cites the original first line, "Cold is the man who can't love", and says that Gaga "seeks not to warn against becoming a cold, loveless man, but to prevent that fate by way of some hot lovin'".

The Christmas song contains dance-pop and synthpop music with synthesizers and a "pounding, grind-worthy beat". Space Cowboy described the song as "futuristic". Referenced in the song lyrics is producer Kierszenbaum's nickname of "Cherry Cherry Boom Boom". Describing the song in episode 25 of her YouTube broadcast series Gaga-vision, Gaga said: ""Christmas Tree" is about the spirit of celebrating the most joyous holiday and I'll tell you why: because Christmas is the holiday that most makes boys and girls feel randy."

== Release ==
"Christmas Tree" was released as a digital download-only single on December 16, 2008, on Interscope Records while Gaga's first single "Just Dance", was charting. It was made available as an MP3 from Amazon and iTunes Store. In July 2009, it appeared as the penultimate track on the memory stick limited edition of The Fame. In December 2009, it was one of the songs free to download from Amazon.com as part of its "25 Days of Free" offer, whereby for the first twenty-five days in December a Christmas-themed song is made free to download from the website. "Christmas Tree" was made available on December 6. The song was included on several compilation albums: Canadian compilation album NOW! Christmas 4, Taiwanese compilation album Christmas 101 and the seasonal compilation album It's Christmas Time, all released for Christmas 2009. It was also included in the compilation albums Merry Xmas! and Now That's What I Call Christmas! 4, part of the Now That's What I Call Music series of compilation albums, both released for Christmas 2010. "Christmas Tree" was also included on The Singles, a box set of CD singles released exclusively in Japan in December 2010. It is on the ninth and last CD, which also includes the three live tracks from The Cherrytree Sessions.

== Critical reception ==
"Christmas Tree" received mixed reviews from critics. Alex Rawls of OffBeat gave a positive review as part of the "25 Days of Free" offer from Amazon.com. Joking that the artists of the more religious songs must be "praying" for Lady Gaga, Rawls described the song as "not so po-faced" as the five songs released before it was made available on December 6, 2009. Estrella Adeyeri, the music editor of Nouse, gave the song a positive review, complimenting its "synth beats and numerous yuletide innuendos". Diana Nabiruma of The Weekly Observer described it as "plain naughty and wacky". Jason Lewis for Fast Forward Weekly called the song "charmingly ludicrous" and called it among "the best 'new' holiday music out there". Chad Bullock of MTV included "Christmas Tree" in a list of "excellent" new Christmas music, describing it as "non-traditional and vaguely sexual".

Molly Gamble of Marquette Tribune gave "Christmas Tree" a negative review, criticising the song's "poorly veiled metaphor" for sex and calling the song "shameless". She commented that "Christmas Tree" is not a song one can listen to in the presence of family and that it "makes Christmas feel dirty". Katie Hasty and Melinda Newman of HitFix gave the song a very negative review, calling it "stupendously stupid and awful" and the "most terrible Christmas song ever in the whole wide world ever", criticising its obvious sexual metaphors. Cassaundra Baber of Observer-Dispatch listed the song on list of "Horrible holiday hits", criticising it for being "sexualized" and calling it "not for the kids". Kristen S. Hé of Vulture found the track to be Gaga's worst in her discography, describing it as overly tongue-in-cheek, saying it essentially "collapses under its own weight" and feels more like a joke than a real song. She criticized its simplistic lyrics, mismatched vocals and synths, and suggested that Space Cowboy's guest verse is best left unmentioned.

The song was described as "porn-tastic" in a review for Now! Christmas 4 by Eye Weekly reviewer Chris Bilton, quoting the lyric "My Christmas tree is delicious". Bilton also called it one of few tracks on the album that make it a "worthy stocking stuffer". Also in a review for Now! Christmas 4, Charlottetown Guardian reviewer Doug Gallant called "Christmas Tree" a "dreadful offering". Beverley Lunney, a reviewer for Winnipeg Free Press, gave the song a negative review, commenting that listeners would be "offended" by the song's "truly unfestive metaphors" and called it one of a "sea of unbearable original tunes" on Now! Christmas 4. In a review of Now! Christmas 4, John Lucas of The Georgia Straight described the song as a "filthy electro banger" and "so blatantly about [sex] that you have to wonder how in the hell it got past the usually vigilant Now! gatekeepers", calling it the "single exception" to an otherwise bland album. In a review for It's Christmas Time, Chester Chronicle reviewer Polly Weeks called the song something that "will keep teenagers happy". In a review for Now That's What I Call Christmas! 4, J Matthew Cobb of HiFi Magazine called "Christmas Tree" part of a "good list" of new material and described it as "naughty, but nice".

== Live performance ==
In December 2024, Gaga performed the song live for the first time, 16 years after its release, in a Christmas special of Carpool Karaoke released on the streaming service Apple TV+. She sang the track along with guest driver Zane Lowe.

== Chart performance ==
Due to high digital downloads, "Christmas Tree" entered the Canadian Hot 100 chart at number seventy-nine in the first week of January 2009, remaining on the chart for one week. In October 2010, "Christmas Tree" entered the Billboard Holiday Digital Song Sales chart in the US, peaking at position 15 in January 2011. In December 2010, it also ranked at position 23 on the "Hot 100 Holiday Christmas Songs" by Billboard, based on sales and airplay over the winter period as calculated by Nielsen SoundScan and Nielson BDS. In November 2010, "Christmas Tree" charted on the RIAJ Digital Track Chart of Japan, entering at position eighteen, its peak. The song then dropped to positions 51, 74, 81 and 100 before leaving the chart.

== Track listing ==
- Digital download
1. "Christmas Tree" (featuring Space Cowboy) – 2:22

== Charts ==
Chart performance for "Christmas Tree"
Chart (2008–10)	Peak position
Canada Hot 100 (Billboard)	79
Japan Digital Tracks (RIAJ)	18
US Holiday Digital Song Sales (Billboard)	15
