= We the People (Flipsyde album) =

Studio album by Flipsyde
- Released: July 12, 2005
- Genre: Alternative hip-hop
- Length: 51:25
- Label: Cherrytree; Interscope
- Producer: Michael Urbano

Flipsyde chronology
We the People (2005)	State of Survival (2009)

Singles from We the People
- 1. "Someday" Released: 2005; 2. "Happy Birthday" Released: 2005; 3. "Trumpets" Released: 2006; 4. "Angel" Released: 2006

Professional ratings
Review scores
Source	Rating
AllMusic	3.5/5 stars
laut.de	2/5 stars
RapReviews	8.5/10

We the People is the debut studio album by alternative hip-hop group Flipsyde. It was released on July 12, 2005 via Cherrytree/Interscope Records.

== Promotion ==
Flipsyde toured Europe with Snoop Dogg and the Black Eyed Peas in support of the album, and sales were spurred by the single "Someday" being played in advertising for NBC's broadcast of the 2006 Winter Olympics. We the People peaked at number 43 on Billboard's Top Heatseekers chart in 2006, and sold 62,000 copies. A limited-edition reissue including five additional tracks was released in 2006, packaged with an accompanying DVD.

== Reception ==
We the People was named the "best hip-hop album" of 2005 by Geoffrey Himes of The Washington Post, for its "combination of live instruments, political commentary, introspection and catchy melodies".

== Track listing ==
No.	Title	Length
1.	"Someday"	3:59
2.	"Spun"	3:54
3.	"US History"	5:13
4.	"Flipsyde"	4:36
5.	"Revolutionary Beat"	5:01
6.	"Time"	4:26
7.	"No More"	4:30
8.	"Train"	4:17
9.	"Get Ready"	3:22
10.	"Angel"	4:26
11.	"Skippin' Stones"	3:45
12.	"Trumpets"	3:56
Total length:		51:25

No.	Title	Length
13.	"Happy Birthday"

== Charts ==
Chart (2005–06)	Peak position
German Albums (Offizielle Top 100)	56
US Heatseekers Albums (Billboard)	43
