= Someday (Flipsyde song) =

Single by Flipsyde

from the album We the People
- Released: April 26, 2005
- Genre: Alternative hip-hop, R&B
- Length: 4:00
- Label: Cherrytree/Interscope

Flipsyde singles chronology
"Someday" (2005)	"Happy Birthday" (2006)

Music video
- "Someday" on YouTube

"Someday" is a single by alternative hip-hop group Flipsyde, from their 2005 debut album We the People.

== Release ==
"Someday" was chosen by NBC as the theme song to advertise their coverage of the 2006 Winter Olympics, as the network felt its sound would attract younger viewers. Though the single did not chart in the United States, the resulting exposure led to an increase in album sales and Flipsyde performing at the 2006 Winter X Games.

Two music videos were produced, one by NBC featuring ice skaters Michelle Kwan and Apolo Anton Ohno, and the other as the official video. The track was additionally included in the soundtrack of the 2008 film Never Back Down.

== Reception ==
Patrick Ryan of USA Today praised the single in 2016 as one of the "best Olympics theme songs" for its "unique combination of rap and Spanish guitar". However, Troy Farah of the Phoenix New Times wrote that it was "a transparent attempt by NBC to get the younger generation to pay attention to the Olympics", while Travis Jones of The Sydney Morning Herald criticized its selection due to its lyrical content that he felt had no connection to the event.

== Track listing ==
1. "Someday" — 4:00
2. "Someday (instrumental)" — 4:19

== Chart positions ==
Chart (2005)	Peak position
Finland Top 40 Singles	10
German Top 100 Singles	10
Swedish Top 40 Singles	29

== Release history ==
Release dates and formats for "Someday"
Region	Date	Format	Label(s)	Ref.
United States	March 21, 2006	Mainstream airplay	Interscope	
