= Beautiful, Dirty, Rich =

Promotional single by Lady Gaga

from the album The Fame
- Released: September 16, 2008
- Recorded: 2006
- Studio: 150 (Parsippany-Troy Hills, New Jersey)
- Genre: Dance-pop; disco-funk
- Length: 2:52
- Label: Streamline; KonLive; Cherrytree; Interscope
- Songwriters: Lady Gaga; Rob Fusari
- Producer: Rob Fusari

Music video
- "Beautiful, Dirty, Rich" on YouTube

"Beautiful, Dirty, Rich" is a song by American singer–songwriter Lady Gaga from her debut studio album, The Fame (2008). It was released as a promotional single from the album on September 16, 2008. Written by the singer and its producer Rob Fusari in 2006, it is an uptempo dance-pop and disco-funk song that makes heavy use of synthesizers. The lyrics focus on Gaga's experiences as a struggling artist on the Lower East Side. The song was met with positive reception, with reviewers complimenting the lyrics and the fun nature of the song. It also achieved minor commercial success, peaking at number 83 on the UK Singles Chart.

Two versions were released of the song's accompanying music video – one was intercut with clips of the ABC series Dirty Sexy Money, serving as a promotion for the show, and the other was the full-length video. Both versions feature Gaga and company dancing around in a mansion and burning money. Gaga has performed the song live on various occasions, including on her first headlining the Fame Ball Tour, where she performed the song while wearing a futuristic bustier with silver triangular panels, and later included it in the setlist of the Monster Ball Tour, and her Las Vegas residency, Enigma.

== Background ==
Gaga said the song "was just me trying to figure things out", and she later stated that she "was doing a lot of drugs" when she wrote the song. She claims it is about how "whoever you are or where[ver] you live – you can self-proclaim this inner fame based on your personal style, and your opinions about art and the world, despite being conscious of it", and also about her experiences as a struggling artist working on the Lower East Side. The line "Daddy, I'm so sorry, I'm so s-s-sorry, yeah", according to Gaga, was inspired by "rich kids" in the area who she would hear calling their parents for money to buy drugs with. She added that "ultimately what I want people to take from it is 'Bang-bang.' No matter who you are and where you come from, you can feel beautiful and dirty rich." The song was intended to be the second single from The Fame, but was cancelled in favor of "Poker Face".

== Composition ==
"Beautiful, Dirty, Rich"
A sample of Gaga's "Beautiful, Dirty, Rich". This section includes the "Daddy, I'm so sorry" pre-chorus.

"Beautiful, Dirty, Rich" is an uptempo dance-pop song which is more synth-heavy compared to the mostly electronic songs on The Fame. According to the sheet music published at Musicnotes.com by Sony/ATV Music Publishing, the song has a moderate electro-dance-pop groove and it is composed in the key of B minor with a tempo of 120 beats per minute. The song is set in common time, and Gaga's vocal range spans from A_{3} to D_{5}. It has a basic sequence of Bm–D_{5}–A♭–Bm–D_{5}–A♭ as its chord progression. Kristen S. Hé of Vulture classified "Beautiful, Dirty, Rich" as a disco-funk song that sounded like the Scissor Sisters and Prince, while The Independent's Adam White highlighted its "Fiona Apple-ish piano dramatics and lyrical allusions to daddy issues and violence".

During recording of the song, Gaga was reluctant to add any dance-oriented beats to the song, and insisted on keeping its original rock version. However, music producer Rob Fusari convinced her that a drum machine would not hurt her integrity, telling her that Queen, who was one of Gaga's musical inspirations, used it in their music. Fusari commented, "I think that's what finally got her to give it a shot, [...] We finished 'Beautiful, Dirty, Rich' that day. It's one of the songs on her debut album."

== Critical reception ==
"Beautiful, Dirty, Rich" received positive reviews from critics. Matthew Chisling of AllMusic used the song and "Paparazzi" as examples of how The Fame's lyrics "salt and pepper the album with a nasty, club-friendly feeling of fun and feistiness that an excellent, well-produced dance album should have." Genevieve Koski of The A.V. Club called "LoveGame" and this song "propulsive club anthems" that "chug along on wave after wave of synths and programmed drums, resulting in a dizzying sonic trip that approximates the high point of a chemically enhanced night of club-hopping." For Sputnikmusic's Daniel Incognito, the track "bounces about with a funky beat and great vocal layering." Sal Cinquemani of Slant Magazine said that Gaga "successfully [tosses] out dirties" on the song. Vulture's Kristen S. Hé felt "Beautiful, Dirty, Rich" portrayed Gaga as an outcast indulging in "tongue-in-cheek hedonism", adding that the song "perfectly encapsulates the attitude that would soon make her famous". Priya Elan of The Times was less positive, arguing that "Beautiful, Dirty, Rich", "Paparazzi" and the title track, despite forming the core of the album's celebrity theme, "don't ruminate on the addictive inanity of fame", instead "choosing to observe passively".

== Chart performance ==
The song debuted on the UK Singles Chart at number 89 due to strong digital downloads, on the issue dated February 21, 2009. On its second week, it rose to number 83 which is where it peaked, and the next week it dropped to number 87, which was its final appearance on the chart. As of March 2020, the song has sold 53,000 copies and acquired 2.57 million streams, making it Gaga's biggest non-single from The Fame in the UK.

On the Billboard Dance/Electronic Digital Songs chart of April 3, 2010, the song reached a peak of number 28. According to MRC Data, the song has sold 275,000 digital downloads in the United States.

== Music video ==
A music video was filmed for the song and directed by Melina Matsoukas in July 2008. There are two versions of the video — one intercut with clips from the ABC channel's TV series Dirty Sexy Money and created to promote the show, which premiered on September 29, 2008, and another without them which is the official video, which premiered on October 14, 2008. The video is set in a mansion, and starts with Gaga making her way down a hallway with several people who are either walking behind her, holding an umbrella over her, dancing in front of her, or tossing dollar bills around her. Gaga and company are then featured in many repeatedly-changing shots at various locations in the mansion. She is seen lying seductively on a table covered with money, crawling along a black grand piano and striking the keys with her leg several times, dancing around and later making out with a statue, and dancing in an elevator solo. There are also several close-up shots of her burning money and later stuffing it into her mouth. Over the course of the video, she undergoes numerous costume changes. Singer-songwriter Space Cowboy is also shown, most notably in scenes where he climbs a wall.

== Live performances ==
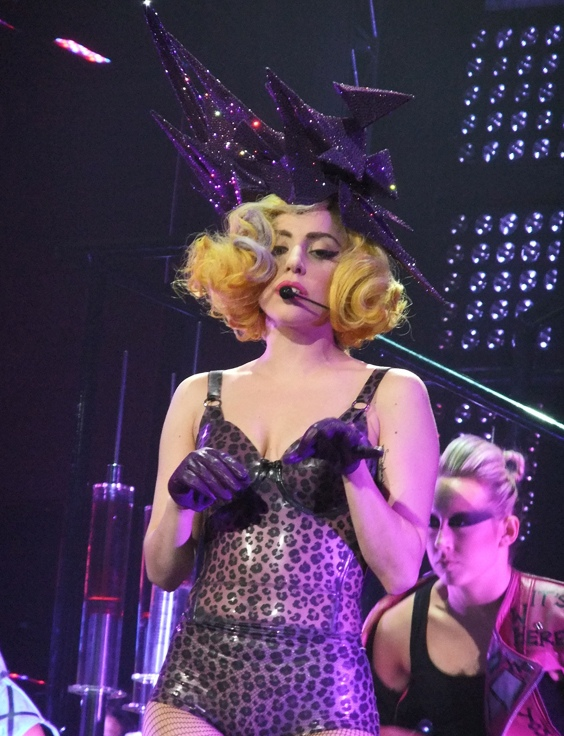
Gaga performing the song during The Monster Ball Tour, in 2010

Gaga performed "Beautiful, Dirty, Rich" live at the Sessions@AOL, where she also performed "Just Dance", an acoustic version of "Poker Face", "Paparazzi", and "LoveGame". She also performed it at the MTV UK Live Sessions, also singing "Just Dance", "LoveGame", and "Poker Face".

The singer performed the song on her first headlining tour, The Fame Ball. It was preceded by the opening song, "Paparazzi", and a brief medley of "Starstruck" and "LoveGame". The performance of "Beautiful, Dirty, Rich" followed, with Gaga frolicking with her dancers and wearing an "austere" blonde bob wig. The song was the end of the first of four parts of the show, and was followed by a video clip, "The Brain", which featured Gaga as her alter ego, Candy Warhol, brushing her hair. The performance of the song, along with the rest of the first quarter of the show, was praised by Jim Harrington of San Jose Mercury News for giving the show a strong beginning, and Gaga's vocal performance was also complimented.

"Beautiful, Dirty, Rich" was performed on both the original and revised versions of Gaga's The Monster Ball Tour (2009–2011). During the revamped show, Gaga performed the song while scaling various pieces of scaffolding and shouting at the audience to "get those guns out and shoot that money ... you don't need it!" The song was again performed on Gaga's 2018–2020 Las Vegas residency show, Enigma. Brittany Spanos of Rolling Stone felt that the performance of this song, along with another track, "The Fame", "celebrate those early, broke years as a starving artist stalking the streets of New York City’s Lower East Side", and helped the show's narrative in "revisiting [the singer's] past".

== Credits and personnel ==
Credits adapted from the liner notes of The Fame.

- Lady Gaga – vocals, songwriting, piano, synthesizer
- Rob Fusari – songwriting, production
- Tom Kafafian – guitar
- Calvin "Sci-Fidelty" Gaines – bass guitar, programming
- Dave Murga – drums
- Robert Orton – audio mixing
- Gene Grimaldi – audio mastering at Oasis Mastering, Burbank, California
- Recorded at 150 Studios, Parsippany-Troy Hills, New Jersey

== Charts ==
Weekly chart performance for "Beautiful, Dirty, Rich"
| Chart (2008–2010) | Peak position |
|---|---|
| UK Singles (Official Charts) | 83 |
| US Dance/Electronic Digital Songs (Billboard) | 28 |

== Certifications and sales ==
Certifications and sales for "Beautiful, Dirty, Rich"
| Region | Certification | Certified units/sales |
|---|---|---|
| United Kingdom | — | 53,000 |
| United States (RIAA) | Gold | 500,000^{^} |
^{^} Shipments figures based on certification alone.
