= Slapper (Ayye) =

"Slapper (Ayyee)"

Single by Nadia Oh
- Released: 15 March 2012
- Recorded: 2012; London, England
- Genre: Pop, dance, hip hop, trap
- Length: 2:35
- Label: Tiger Trax
- Songwriters: Space Cowboy, Nadia Oh
- Producer: Space Cowboy

Nadia Oh singles chronology
| "'No Bueno'" (2011) | "Slapper (Ayyee)" (2012) |

"Slapper (Ayye)" is the seventh single by British singer Nadia Oh. The song was written by Space Cowboy and Oh and produced by the former. It was released on 12 March 2012 via iTunes.

Its video, premiering 22 May 2012 focuses on 'Oh herself and is her first not to focus or heavily use green screen. The song has been well received by fans and by fellow artists, where DJ Diplo added the track to his radio playlist.

== Composition ==
Written and produced by Space Cowboy it contains elements of SL2's "On a Ragga Trip". It also contains references to Kim Kardashian, Rick Ross and the song's producer. It uses the reference towards the producer, "Space Cowboy Just Play That Track" for the single version, however the video version stops at "Cowboy". Another difference in the video edit is the reference towards Kardashian.

== Release ==
=== Release date ===
The song was released online on 7 March 2012, collecting a warm response it was released digitally on 15 March. It also received its first play on BBC Radio One by Diplo.

=== Music video ===
The music video was released online at YouTube. It sees 'Oh in front of fluorescent coloured walls and white backgrounds in numerous outfits, most notably as a mermaid and a French maid. The video begins with 'Oh in front of a white background placing her hands around her hips before an assortment of further scenes are quickly previewed such as The Mermaid, The Black Outfit and The Green Head Wear. Before 'Oh starts to sing. From then no more new clips are shown before concluding on the white background.

The video has received a positive response online with one calling it "Her best video" and others hailing it "my summer anthem", However the criticism came from the feel for a dance sequence. It currently has 100,000 hits; her highest viewed video yet and an estimated 90% approval from fans.

== Track list and formats ==
Download

1. Slapper (Ayye) - Explicit
2. Slapper (Ayye) - Censored
