= LoveGame =

2009 single by Lady Gaga

Single by Lady Gaga

from the album The Fame
- B-side: "LoveGame (space cowboy remix)"
- Released: March 23, 2009
- Recorded: 2008
- Studio: Record Plant (Hollywood); Chalice (Hollywood)
- Genre: Synth-pop; dance-pop; electro-R&B
- Length: 3:36
- Label: Streamline; KonLive; Cherrytree; Interscope
- Songwriters: Lady Gaga; RedOne
- Producer: RedOne

Lady Gaga singles chronology
"Eh, Eh (Nothing Else I Can Say)" (2009)	"LoveGame" (2009)	"Chillin" (2009)

Music video
- "LoveGame" on YouTube

"LoveGame" is a song released by American singer Lady Gaga from her debut studio album, The Fame (2008). The track was released as the album's third single in North America and Europe and the fourth single in Australia, New Zealand, and Sweden after "Eh, Eh (Nothing Else I Can Say)". It was also released as the fourth single in the United Kingdom, after "Paparazzi". A synth-pop, dance-pop, and electro-R&B song, "LoveGame" was written by Gaga herself, alongside the song's producer, RedOne.

Critics appreciated the song's rhythm and the "I wanna take a ride on your disco stick" hook. Gaga had explained that the term "disco stick" is a euphemism for a penis and was inspired by her sexual attraction to a stranger at a night club. Musically carrying the vibe of underground New York discos, "LoveGame" talks about love, fame, and sexuality which was the central theme of the album. The song received a number of remixes, one of them featuring rock musician Marilyn Manson. "LoveGame" was a commercial success, charting within the top ten in the United States, Australia, New Zealand, Canada, France, Germany, and other European countries. It became Gaga's third consecutive number-one song on the Billboard Mainstream Top 40 chart and achieved triple platinum certification from the Recording Industry Association of America (RIAA).

The New York underground-inspired music video for the song was directed by Joseph Kahn, and portrayed Gaga dancing at an underground subway station and in a parking lot. The music video was a tribute from the singer to the New York lifestyle including its glamour, fans and fashion. It was influenced by the music video for Michael Jackson's "Bad", which also took place in a subway station, and features Gaga wearing Nazi chic clothes. The music video was banned from broadcast at the PG-rated time slots in Australian television channels because of its sexual content. "LoveGame" has been performed live a number of times by Gaga, including television appearances, such as Dancing with the Stars and The Ellen DeGeneres Show, the 2009 MuchMusic Video Awards, and many of the singer's concert tours. She usually performs the song while holding her characteristic "disco stick" in one hand.

== Background and release ==
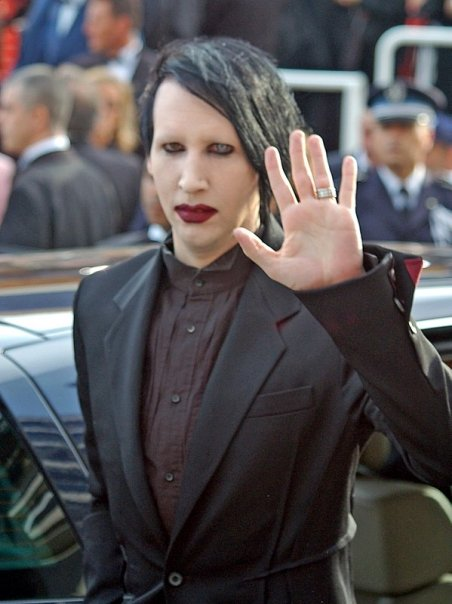
A remix of "LoveGame" features vocals by Marilyn Manson.

Towards the end of 2007, Lady Gaga's management company introduced her to songwriter and producer RedOne, whom they also managed. By 2008, Gaga relocated to Los Angeles in order to work extensively with her record label to complete her debut album, The Fame, and set up her own creative team called the Haus of Gaga. "LoveGame" was one of the songs written by Gaga and RedOne who also produced the track. With Rolling Stone, Gaga explained that she was at a nightclub and had a "sexual crush" on somebody. She went up to the person and uttered the line, "I wanna ride on your disco stick". Thinking it to be a thoughtful metaphor for penis, Gaga went to the recording studio the next day and wrote the song in roughly four minutes. Gaga also had ideas for the live performance of the song where she used "an actual stick—it looks like a giant rock-candy pleasuring tool—that lights up".

While commenting in regards to the lyrical content of the song on Australian talk show, Rove, Gaga said that she was unrepentant about her "disco stick" metaphor, though it led to a banning of the music video on Network Ten in Australia. She added that the metaphor was not meant to be subtle and was clear what the lyrics constituted off. "If anything, I happen to think people are frivolously hard on me", Gaga generalized. She went on to relegate "lot of youth-oriented pop music" as much racier than hers with their sexually provocative lyrics, but Gaga felt that the whole context of her visuals alongside the music was what made people react. "It's the music in relation to the visual, in relation to the way I move and the way I articulate the lyrics. But if I wanted to make music to make people sing 'la di da' that would be very boring," she concluded.

"LoveGame" was released as the album's third single in North America and Europe and the fourth single in Australia, New Zealand, and Sweden after "Eh, Eh (Nothing Else I Can Say)". In the US it was sent to Contemporary hit radio (CHR) formats for airplay from May 12, 2009. The track initially had been planned as the third single release in the United Kingdom, but deeming its lyrics and music video potentially controversial, it was decided that "Paparazzi" would be released instead. "LoveGame" has received a number of remix treatments, one of which featured vocals from rocker Marilyn Manson. Daniel Kreps from Rolling Stone reported that the remix was conceived during Gaga's photoshoot with the magazine in May 2009, when Manson arrived on the set. The rocker was impressed by the shoot and wanted to collaborate with Gaga on "LoveGame".

== Recording and composition ==
"LoveGame"
A 23-second sample of Gaga's "LoveGame" where the chorus is played backed by the line "I wanna take a ride on your disco stick."

"LoveGame" was recorded at Record Plant Studios and Chalice Recording Studios, both in Hollywood, California. Along with the production work of the track, RedOne also contributed to its background vocals, instrumentation, programming, audio engineering and recording. Other personnel involved in creating the final version of the song included Robert Orton who did the audio mixing, and Gene Grimaldi who mastered the song at Oasis Mastering in Burbank, California.

Musically, "LoveGame" is an uptempo synth-pop, dance-pop, and electro-R&B song. According to Kerri Mason of Billboard, the composition has a vibe of the New York downtown musical scene, but has a more mainstream appeal to it, making it perfect for radio, "without losing its smut and sass". The song does not have a massive sound like previous single "Poker Face", nor has a big melody like subsequent single, "Paparazzi". Instead the composition of the song is electro-R&B, consisting of big beats and a number of hooks, with Gaga repeating the word "huh!" from time to time.

Gaga explained that the lyrics of "LoveGame" were clear about what the song is all about. She thought that the lyrics portrayed a powerful message about love, fame, and sexuality which was the central theme of The Fame. According to the sheet music published at Musicnotes.com by Sony/ATV Music Publishing, "LoveGame" is set in the time signature of common time and is composed in the key of B minor with a moderate tempo of 104 beats per minute. Gaga's vocal range spans from B_{3} to G_{5}. It follows in the chord progression of Bm–Em–D–Bm–Em–D in the first two verse and chorus while progressing as Bm–Em–Bm–Em in the intermediate verse before the final chorus.

== Critical reception ==
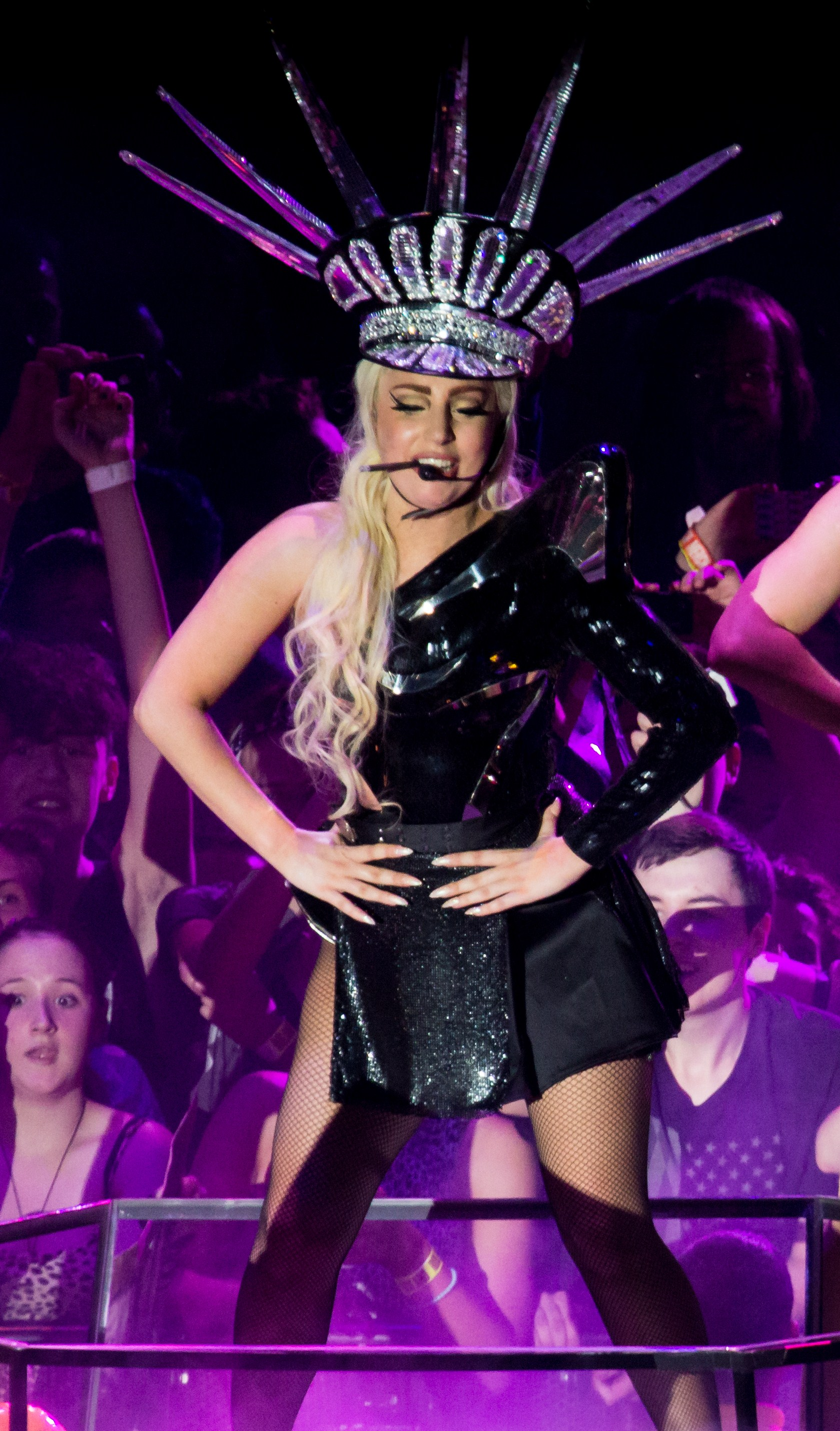
Gaga performing "LoveGame" on the Born This Way Ball tour (2012)

The song received mostly positive reviews from critics. The Phoenix music editor Daniel Brockman said that "Gaga ups the ante in terms of catchy song writing and sheer high-in-the-club-banging-to-the-beat abandon." He also commented on the lyrics saying that "'Let's have some fun, this beat is sick / I wanna take a ride on your disco stick' might be the trashiest-yet-awesomest refrain I've heard on a major-label record this year." Sal Cinquemani of Slant Magazine criticized the song for "cheap" lyrics and "painfully enunciat[ing] without any resemblance of actual sex appeal". While reviewing The Fame, BBC said that the song sounded robotic in the line "I wanna take a ride on your disco stick", though deemed it a brilliant track which "leaves us awarding Gaga the yearbook title of 'pop star most likely to kill'."

Nick Levine from Digital Spy believed that lines like "I wanna take a ride on your disco stick" was a direct reason of Gaga's commercial success. Although he felt that the song was "attention-seeking", he knew that it would provoke reaction from the masses, be it good or bad. Genevieve Koski from The A.V. Club called the song as a "propulsive club anthem" and complimented its synths and drum programming. She described it aurally as "a dizzying sonic trip that approximates the high point of a chemically enhanced night of club-hopping." Evan Sawdey from PopMatters complimented RedOne's production on the song, listing it as one of the best tracks on The Fame.

Ben Hogwood from MusicOMH declared the song as "top notch, diamond-encrusted pop" along with other tracks like "Starstruck" and "Paparazzi". He found the lyrics to be sometimes odd, especially the statement, "I'm on a mission, and it involves some heavy touchin'." Sarah Rodman of The Boston Globe said that the song "has a gutter level quippage with sinuous moves". Priya Elan from The Times was not impressed with the song and called it calculated. Billboard music editor Chris Williams gave the song a positive review, commenting that "It has all the winning ingredients of its predecessors: a radio-friendly, club/electropop feel; a provocative, yet silly enough catchphrase and hook; and a dash of '80s synth magic, so the adults can play along. On 'LoveGame' Gaga is in it to win it."

== Chart performance ==
Following its release, "LoveGame" debuted on the Billboard Hot 100 at number 96 for the week ending March 21, 2009, but fell off the chart the following week. After seven weeks it reached number ten on the Hot 100 by selling 107,000 digital downloads and becoming the week's greatest digital gainer. Two weeks later, "LoveGame" peaked at number five on the chart. It reached number-one on the Hot Dance Club Songs, and also became Gaga's third number-one on the Mainstream Top 40 chart. The Recording Industry Association of America (RIAA) certified "LoveGame" triple platinum for shipment of three million copies across United States. It has sold 2.67 million digital downloads in the United States as of February 2019, according to Nielsen Soundscan.

In Canada, the song debuted on the Canadian Hot 100 at number 68 before its official release as a single. Its second appearance was on the chart of January 10, 2009, at number 87. After a few weeks, "LoveGame" entered the top ten of the Canadian Hot 100 and climbed to number five. After fluctuating down the chart for a few weeks "LoveGame" reached a new peak of two on the chart. The song was certified double platinum by the Canadian Recording Industry Association (CRIA) in June 2009, for sales of 160,000 paid digital downloads.

In Australia, the song debuted at number 92 on the ARIA Charts, and then moved up the charts to number 41 the next week. On the issue dated May 11, 2009, the song peaked at number four, becoming Gaga's third top five single there. "LoveGame" was certified quadruple platinum by the Australian Recording Industry Association (ARIA) for sales of 280,000 equivalent units. In New Zealand, the song debuted at number 36 and moved up to a peak of number 12. Recorded Music NZ (RMNZ) certified it platinum for sales of 30,000 equivalent units. On the issue dated March 6, 2009, the song entered the Irish Singles Chart at number 49 and peaked at number 30, after eight weeks on the chart. It also debuted at number 19 in Finland and has since moved to a peak of number 12.

In early 2009, the song charted on the UK Singles Chart and peaked at number 89 based on downloads only. It re-entered the chart at number 64 after the release of the single was announced, and peaked at 19, becoming her lowest-charting single in the UK at that time. The British Phonographic Industry (BPI) certified it platinum, for sales and streams of 600,000 units. In the Netherlands the song debuted at number 28 and has peaked at number five. The song debuted at number six in France and moved to its peak of number five the next week, becoming Gaga's second top five after Poker Face, who peaked atop two months earlier. It debuted at numbers 19 and 38 on the Belgian Ultratop Flanders and Wallonia charts respectively. In Flanders it has reached a peak of six, while in Wallonia it moved to a peak of five. "LoveGame" also reached a peak of number seven on the Billboard European Hot 100 Singles chart.

== Music video ==
=== Background and development ===
"'LoveGame' is a genuine New York lifestyle video. It's got that feeling of 'gay, black New York,' of inclusion and glamour," [...] I wanted to really bring forth the girl that I was four years ago, and I wanted to put it in the setting of the underground subway. I worked with Joseph Kahn, and he did an amazing job. He didn't just capture the fashion; he captured the artist."

— Gaga talking about the inspiration behind the video

The music video was directed by Joseph Kahn, and was shot back-to-back with the video for "Eh, Eh (Nothing Else I Can Say)" on January 9–10, 2009, inside a warehouse at the Port of Los Angeles, located in San Pedro, California. The video premiered on March 23, 2009, in Australia, and on August 13, 2009, in the UK on 4Music channel. The video mainly takes place in a subway station, hence several scenes are reminiscent to Michael Jackson's "Bad" music video, which was also shot in a similar location. Although the video was filmed in Los Angeles, it nevertheless has a New York City setting.

Gaga spoke to Whitney Pastorek of Entertainment Weekly during a "Behind the Scenes" episode of the shoot, about her inspirations for the video. She wanted to have a "giant" dance video with "LoveGame", describing it as "plastic, beautiful, gorgeous, sweaty, tar on the floor". There would be scary and dangerous looking men also in the video. Gaga had the idea of portraying herself and her co-actors as New York inhabitants taking on the role of designers, performance artists, dancers etc. She enlisted people from downtown New York as dancers, who normally would not get cast in a video.

One of the props developed for the video was a pair of sunglasses made of wire. According to Gaga, she imagined "a downtown, bad-ass kid walking down the street with his buddies, grabbing a pair of pliers, and making a pair of sunglasses out of a fence on the street". She wore them on the opening shot of the music video along with a chain link hood garment, saying that "they look so hard. It looks like I plied them right out of the fence and put them on my face".

=== Synopsis ===
Gaga intimidating a circle of men with her disco stick while wearing chain-linked glasses in the music video for "LoveGame"

The video starts with the heading "Streamline presents" and three men moving through Times Square. They open a manhole cover on which "Haus of Gaga" is written. Gaga is then shown naked with blue and purple paint and glitter on her body, frolicking with two men who have the words "Love" and "Fame" shaved into their heads. The scene shifts to a subway where Gaga starts singing in a grey-white leotard with a hood. She carries her characteristic disco stick and wears chain-linked glasses. The chorus starts with Gaga and her dancers progressing through the subway and dancing down a staircase. Two harlequin Great Danes, are also shown on top of the staircase.

The video shifts to a train where the second verse takes place with choreographed dance routines and Gaga wearing black and white jackets. During the intermediate music, Gaga is shown entering a ticket booth with an inspector while kissing and caressing. As the camera pans from right to left the inspector changes from a man to woman in each frame. According to Emma Hope Allwood of Dazed, in the clip Gaga wears Nazi chic fashion based on an outfit Charlotte Rampling wore in The Night Porter (1974); Allwood noted that the outfit had previously been appropriated in the videos for Madonna's "Justify My Love" (1990) and Marilyn Manson's "The Fight Song" (2001). The final scene shows Gaga doing a choreographed dance routine with her crew of backup dancers. The video comes to an end as Gaga and her dancers hold their groins, gesturing towards the camera.

=== Censorship ===
The music video was censored in many countries after its release in 2009. The video faced censorship troubles in Australia where it was rated M by Network Ten for the "suggestive video footage involving bondage and sexual acts". The channel demanded an edited version of the video which would not violate censorship rules. Video Hits refused to air the video in its G- and PG-rated time slots. They cited "numerous sexual references both visually and lyrically" as the reason they could not create a child-friendly edit without bleeping the repeated hook "I wanna take a ride on your disco stick". However, Australian programs like Rage and cable networks Channel V and MTV aired the video in its original form.

The video also faced a ban from MTV Arabia citing the same reason as Australia. Since it was very rare to ban videos on MTV, head of MTV Arabia Samer al Marzouki commented, "We represent the young generation's mentality and culture so we can't play something that conflicts with that. If they can't watch something comfortably with their brother, sisters or friends then we will not play it." In the United States, VH1 and MTV played an edited version that removed the scenes showing Gaga naked, and blurred the label on a bottle of alcohol held by a dancer, but they did not change the lyrics.

== Live performances ==
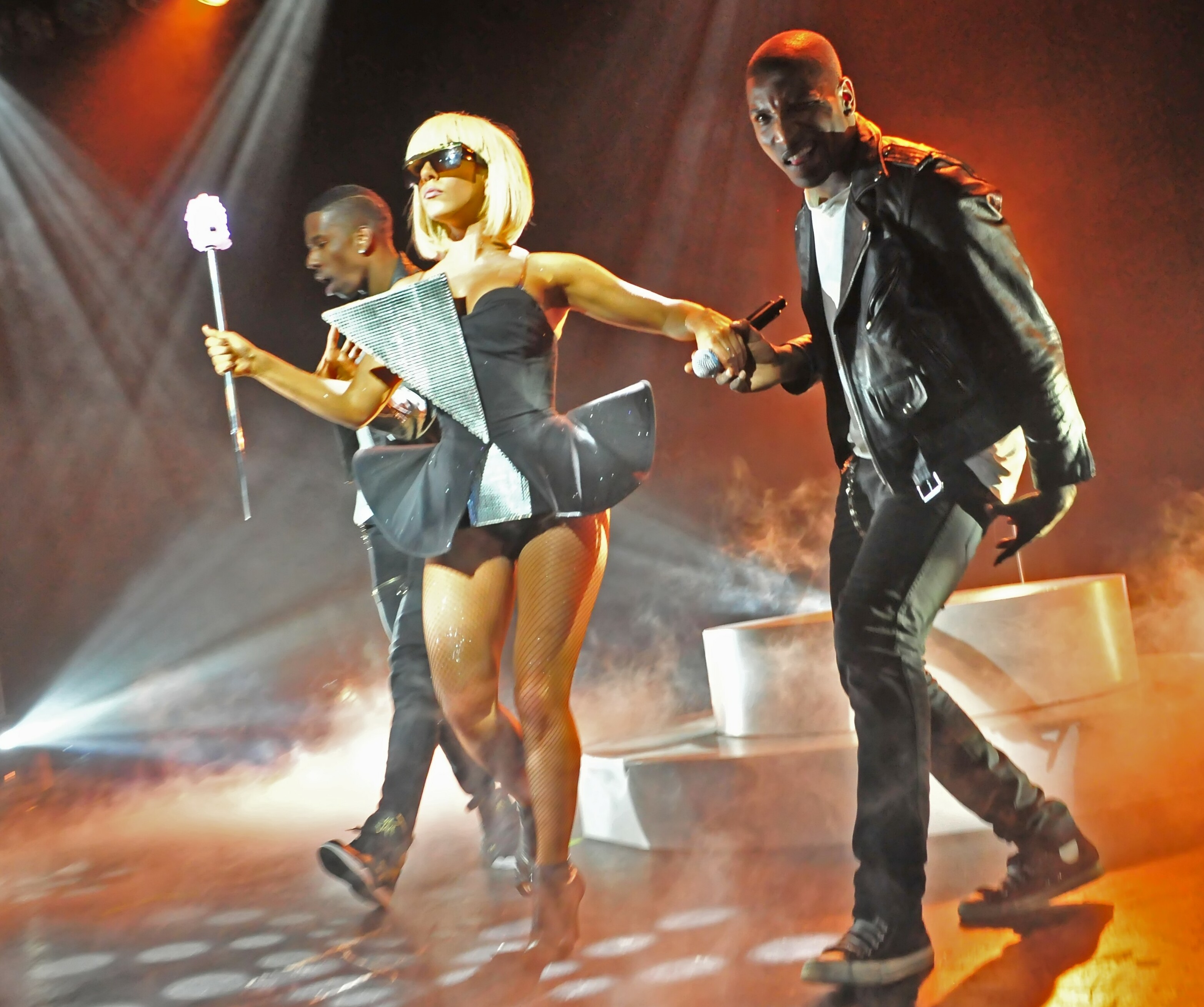
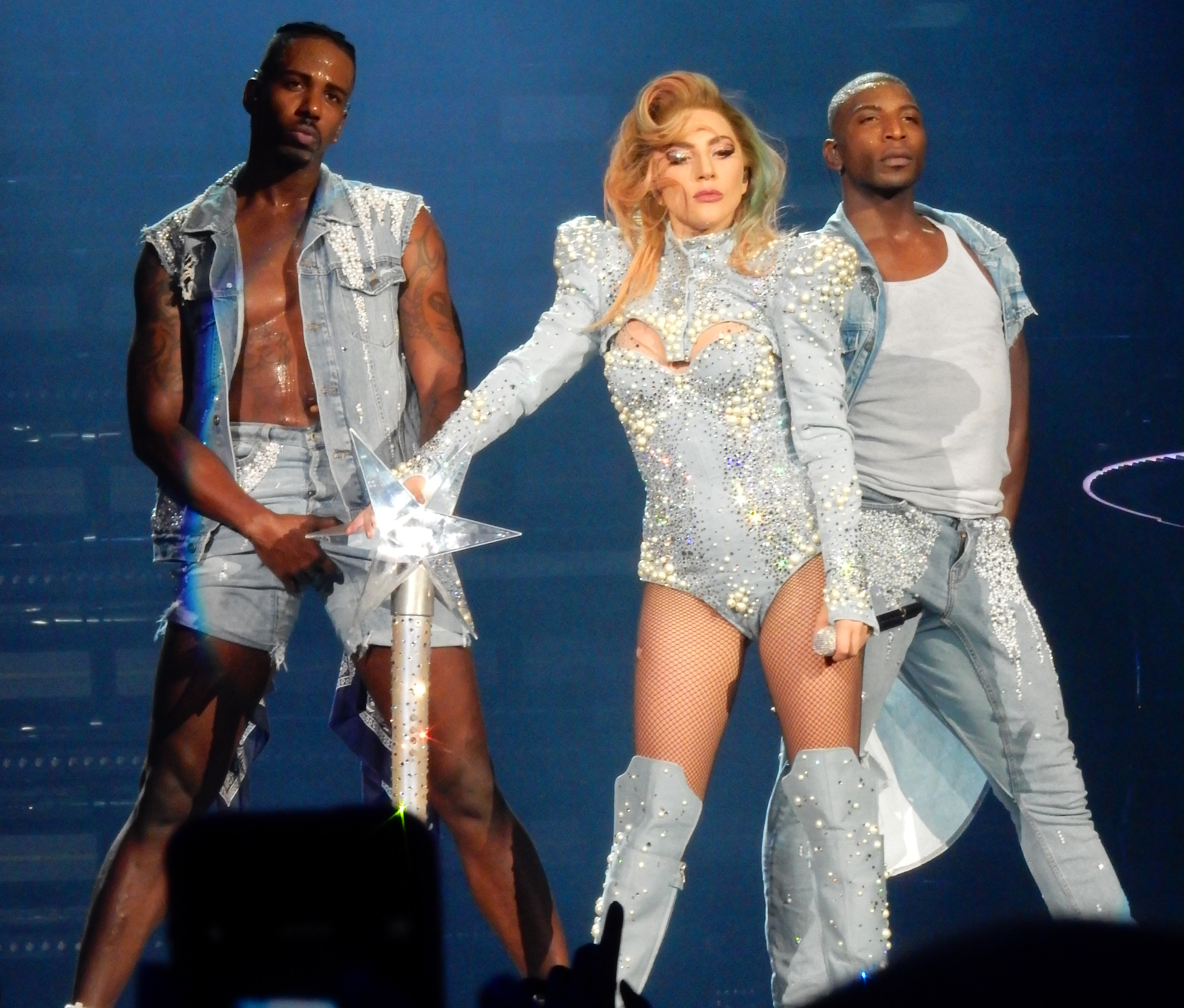
Gaga's live performances of "LoveGame" often involve a version of her disco stick prop, including at The Fame Ball Tour (top, pictured in 2009) and the Joanne World Tour (bottom, pictured in 2018).

Gaga first performed "LoveGame" live in June 2008 on the Isle of Malta special of MTV Asia. She later performed it on the UK program, The Album Chart Show, on February 4, 2009, while promoting The Fame. On March 20, 2009, the song was performed live at the AOL Sessions along with Gaga's other singles such as "Just Dance", "Paparazzi", "Beautiful, Dirty, Rich", and an acoustic version of "Poker Face". An acoustic version of "LoveGame" was performed at the MTV Sessions in January 2009.

The song was a major part of Gaga's The Fame Ball Tour as the second number of the set list, and was performed alongside album track, "Starstruck". Gaga wore a silver and black short skirt looking like a tutu and shaped like a peplum. She had a triangular piece attached on the dress on her right breast, and completed her look with high heeled ultra spike shoes. On May 17, 2009, Gaga performed the song live on Australian talk show, Rove. She also performed the song at the season finale of the eighth season of Dancing with the Stars. A remixed version of "Poker Face" and "LoveGame" was performed at the 2009 MuchMusic Video Awards (MMVA), during the indoor-outdoor street-side show. The performance, which included Gaga being trapped in a fake subway car surrounded by fake police officers, was billed as a tribute to New York City. In 2014, Toronto Sun listed the performance as the fifth most "jaw-dropping" moment in the history of MMVAs, when Gaga introduced her characteristic "flaming bra" during the song. On September 8, 2009, Gaga performed "LoveGame" at the season seven premiere of The Ellen DeGeneres Show. A version featuring a full live band was performed at the thirty-fifth season of American comedy show Saturday Night Live, while wearing a big gyroscope-like contraption that rotated around Gaga.

In late 2009, "LoveGame" was added to the set list of Gaga's The Monster Ball Tour. In the original version of the tour, the singer wore an off-white costume with skeletal lighted headgear and breastplates shaped like ribs. On the revamped shows of The Monster Ball (2010–2011) "LoveGame" was introduced during the second act and featured a New York City subway car on stage from which Gaga and her dancers emerged. While wearing a revealing plastic dress and an exaggerated nun's habit, Gaga wielded the disco stick, which was modified to look like a torch. The song was also included on the set list of the Born This Way Ball tour (2012–2013), where it was shortened and the singer performed it wearing a Statue of Liberty styled head piece. Gaga ventured into the crowd during the song, through the extended pathways from the stage. Joey Guerra from the Houston Chronicle believed that the appearance of "LoveGame" during the tour proved it to be a far superior track than the ones from Gaga's second studio album, Born This Way (2011).

In 2017, Gaga performed "LoveGame" during her headline performance at the Coachella Festival while wearing a black leotard. On the Joanne World Tour (2017–2018), Gaga performed the track decked in a light blue Swarovski-embellished bodysuit and knee-high boots, while holding a new disco stick in her hand. Gaga also performed the song on her 2018–2022 Las Vegas residency show, Enigma. At The Chromatica Ball tour (2022), "LoveGame" featured "grinding guitars" that gave the song a blend of dance-pop and heavy metal styles. During The Mayhem Ball (2025–2026), Gaga donned silver sequin boots while performing a seductive dance for the song.

== Track listing and formats ==
Australian CD single

1. "LoveGame" – 3:33
2. "LoveGame" (Robots to Mars Remix) – 3:13

UK 7-inch Vinyl (Limited Edition)

1. "LoveGame" – 3:32
2. "LoveGame" (Space Cowboy Remix) – 3:20

LoveGame (Chew Fu GhettoHouse Fix) iTunes single

1. "LoveGame" (Chew Fu GhettoHouse Fix) [feat. Marilyn Manson] – 5:20

UK iTunes Remix EP

1. "LoveGame" – 3:37
2. "LoveGame" (Chew Fu GhettoHouse Fix) [feat. Marilyn Manson] – 5:20
3. "LoveGame" (Space Cowboy Remix) – 3:20
4. "LoveGame" (Jody den Broeder Club Remix) – 6:27
5. "LoveGame" (Music Video Version) – 3:44

US and Canadian iTunes remix single

1. "LoveGame" (Dave Audé Radio Edit) – 3:32
2. "LoveGame" (Space Cowboy Remix) – 3:20
3. "LoveGame" (Robots to Mars Remix) – 3:13

iTunes remixes (Bonus Track Version)

1. "LoveGame" (Dave Audé Radio Edit) – 3:32
2. "LoveGame" (Jody den Broeder Radio Edit) – 3:53
3. "LoveGame" (Space Cowboy Remix) – 3:20
4. "LoveGame" (Robots to Mars Remix) – 3:13
5. "LoveGame" (Dave Audé Club Remix) – 8:35
6. "LoveGame" (Jody den Broeder Club Remix) – 6:28
7. "LoveGame" – 3:32

Germany 'The Remixes' CD single

1. "LoveGame (Chew Fu GhettoHouse Fix) [feat. Marilyn Manson] – 5:20
2. "LoveGame (Robots to Mars Remix) – 3:12
3. "LoveGame (Space Cowboy Remix) – 3:20
4. "LoveGame (Jody den Broeder Club Remix) – 6:27
5. "LoveGame (Dave Audé Club Remix) – 8:35
6. "LoveGame (Chester French Remix) – 3:15
7. "LoveGame" – 3:31

UK CD single

1. "LoveGame" – 3:37
2. "LoveGame" (Chew Fu GhettoHouse Fix) [feat. Marilyn Manson] – 5:20

== Credits and personnel ==
Credits adapted from the liner notes of The Fame.

- Lady Gaga – vocals, songwriting, background vocals
- RedOne – songwriting, production, background vocals, instrumentation, programming, audio engineering, recording at Record Plant Studios, Hollywood and Chalice Recording Studios, Los Angeles, California
- Robert Orton – audio mixing
- Gene Grimaldi – audio mastering at Oasis Mastering, Burbank, California

== Charts ==
=== Weekly charts ===
2009 weekly chart performance for "LoveGame"
Chart (2009)	Peak position
Australia (ARIA)	4
Austria (Ö3 Austria Top 40)	6
Belgium (Ultratop 50 Flanders)	6
Belgium (Ultratop 50 Wallonia)	5
Canada Hot 100 (Billboard)	2
Canada CHR/Top 40 (Billboard)	2
Canada Hot AC (Billboard)	2
Croatia International Airplay (HRT)	19
Czech Republic Airplay (ČNS IFPI)	10
European Hot 100 Singles (Billboard)	7
Finland (Suomen virallinen lista)	12
France (SNEP)	5
Germany (GfK)	7
Hungary (Dance Top 40)	6
Hungary (Single Top 40)	4
Israel International Airplay (Media Forest)	6
Ireland (IRMA)	30
Mexico (Billboard Mexican Airplay)	36
Netherlands (Dutch Top 40)	5
Netherlands (Single Top 100)	27
New Zealand (Recorded Music NZ)	12
Scottish Singles Sales (Official Charts)	5
Slovakia Airplay (ČNS IFPI)	10
Sweden (Sverigetopplistan)	12
Switzerland (Schweizer Hitparade)	15
UK Singles (Official Charts)	19
US Billboard Hot 100	5
US Adult Pop Airplay (Billboard)	23
US Dance Club Songs (Billboard)	1
US Hot R&B/Hip-Hop Songs (Billboard)	91
US Pop Airplay (Billboard)	1
US Rhythmic Airplay (Billboard)	7

2025 weekly chart performance for "LoveGame"
Chart (2025)	Peak position
Venezuela Airplay (Record Report)	78

=== Monthly charts ===
Monthly chart performance for "LoveGame"
Chart (2009)	Position
Brazil (Brasil Hot 100 Airplay)	27
Brazil (Brasil Hot Pop Songs)	14

=== Year-end charts ===
2009 year-end chart performance for "LoveGame"
Chart (2009)	Position
Australia (ARIA)	39
Austria (Ö3 Austria Top 40)	51
Belgium (Ultratop 50 Flanders)	30
Belgium (Ultratop 50 Wallonia)	49
Canada (Canadian Hot 100)	13
Croatia International Airplay (HRT)	25
European Hot 100 Singles (Billboard)	46
France (SNEP)	33
Germany (Media Control GfK)	68
Hungary (Dance Top 40)	64
Netherlands (Dutch Top 40)	55
Sweden (Sverigetopplistan)	53
Switzerland (Schweizer Hitparade)	89
UK Singles (Official Charts)	110
US Billboard Hot 100	35
US Dance Club Songs (Billboard)	26
US Pop Airplay (Billboard)	22
US Radio Songs (Billboard)	36
US Rhythmic Airplay (Billboard)	35

== Certifications and sales ==
Certifications and sales for "LoveGame"
Region	Certification	Certified units/sales
Australia (ARIA)	4× Platinum	280,000^{‡}
Austria (IFPI Austria)	Gold	15,000^{*}
Brazil (Pro-Música Brasil)	Platinum	60,000^{‡}
Canada (Music Canada)	2× Platinum	80,000^{*}
Denmark (IFPI Danmark)	Gold	45,000^{‡}
France	—	74,000
Germany (BVMI)	Gold	150,000^{‡}
New Zealand (RMNZ)	Platinum	30,000^{‡}
United Kingdom (BPI)	Platinum	600,000^{‡}
United States (RIAA)	3× Platinum	3,000,000^{‡}
^{*} Sales figures based on certification alone.^{‡} Sales+streaming figures based on certification alone.

== Release history ==
Release dates and formats for "LoveGame"
Region	Date	Format	Version	Label	Ref.
France	March 23, 2009	Digital download	Original	Interscope	
Various	March 31, 2009	Digital download	Robots to Mars remix	Interscope	
Australia	May 1, 2009	CD single	Original; Robots to Mars remix	Interscope	
Italy	May 8, 2009	Radio airplay	Original	Universal	
United States	May 12, 2009	Contemporary hit radio	Original	Streamline; KonLive; Cherrytree; Interscope	
Various	May 12, 2009	Digital EP	Remixes	Interscope	
France	May 25, 2009	Digital EP	Remixes	Interscope	
France	June 9, 2009	CD single	Remixes	Streamline; KonLive; Cherrytree; Interscope	
United States	June 9, 2009	CD single	Remixes	Streamline; KonLive; Cherrytree; Interscope	
Various	June 17, 2009	Digital download	Chew Fu Ghettohouse Fix	Interscope	
Canada	June 23, 2009	Digital download	Medley Live at MMVA 2009 ("LoveGame" / "Poker Face")	Interscope	
Brazil	June 26, 2009	Digital download	Original; Remixes	Interscope	
Finland	June 26, 2009	Digital download	Original; Remixes	Interscope	
France	June 26, 2009	Digital download	Original; Remixes	Interscope	
Germany	June 26, 2009	Digital download	Original; Remixes	Interscope	
Japan	June 26, 2009	Digital download	Original; Remixes	Interscope	
Germany	July 17, 2009	CD single	Remixes	Interscope	
United Kingdom	September 17, 2009	Digital EP	Original; Remixes	Interscope	
United Kingdom	September 21, 2009	7-inch single	Original; Space Cowboy remix	Interscope	
United Kingdom	September 21, 2009	CD single	Various	Interscope	

== See also ==
- List of Billboard Mainstream Top 40 number-one songs of 2009
- List of number-one dance singles of 2009 (U.S.)
