= Happy Birthday (Flipsyde song) =

Single by Flipsyde featuring Piper

from the album We the People
- Released: December 27, 2005
- Genre: Hip hop
- Length: 3:17
- Label: Interscope
- Songwriters: Jinho Ferreira, Martin Kierszenbaum

Flipsyde singles chronology
"Someday" (2005)	"Happy Birthday" (2005)	"Trumpets (Never Be the Same Again)" (2006)

Music video
- "Happy Birthday" on YouTube

"Happy Birthday" is a single by Flipsyde from their album We the People, released on December 27, 2005. The track's theme is a man apologizing for his involvement in an abortion, and features samples of "Gomenasai" by t.A.T.u., including their vocals on backup.

== Track listing ==
1. "Happy Birthday" (feat. Piper) — 3:15
2. "Peace" (feat. Piper & Black Albert) — 2:59
3. "Shaka" (feat. Piper) — 5:35
4. "Happy Birthday" (Multimedia Track)

== Chart positions ==
=== Weekly charts ===
Chart (2006)	Peak position
Austria (Ö3 Austria Top 40)	10
Czech Republic Airplay (ČNS IFPI)	1
Denmark Airplay (Tracklisten)	11
Germany (GfK)	4
Romania (Romanian Top 100)	88
Russia Airplay (TopHit)	12
Slovakia Airplay (ČNS IFPI)	59
Sweden (Sverigetopplistan)	3
Switzerland (Schweizer Hitparade)	11

=== Year-end charts ===
Chart (2006)	Position
Austria (Ö3 Austria Top 40)	47
Germany (Official German Charts)	28
Russia Airplay (TopHit)	86
Sweden (Sverigetopplistan)	54
Switzerland (Schweizer Hitparade)	76

2007 year-end chart performance for "Happy Birthday"
Chart (2007)	Position
Russia Airplay (TopHit)	106

=== Decade-end charts ===
Decade-end chart performance for "Happy Birthday"
Chart (2000–2009)	Position
Russia Airplay (TopHit)	176

== Certifications ==
Region	Certification	Certified units/sales
Germany (BVMI)	Gold	150,000^{‡}
Sweden (GLF)	Platinum	20,000^{^}
^{^} Shipments figures based on certification alone.^{‡} Sales+streaming figures based on certification alone.
