= Monster (Lady Gaga song) =

2009 song by Lady Gaga

Song by Lady Gaga

from the EP The Fame Monster
- Released: November 18, 2009
- Recorded: 2009
- Studio: Record Plant (Los Angeles)
- Genre: Europop; dance-pop
- Length: 4:09
- Label: Streamline; KonLive; Cherrytree; Interscope
- Songwriters: RedOne; Lady Gaga; Space Cowboy
- Producer: RedOne

Audio video
- "Monster" on YouTube

"Monster" is a song by American singer Lady Gaga from her third EP, The Fame Monster (2009). Inspired by her "Fear of Attachment Monster", the record was produced by Nadir "RedOne" Khayat, and written by Gaga, RedOne and Space Cowboy. Gaga had explained that "Monster" describes her fear of sex and relationships, and described the lyrics as being in love with the bad boy all the time, but instead of running away, one keeps going back to the same person. She added that the fear in "Monster" erupted from her need to have a stable relationship. Incorporating the usage of heavy bass lines, descending keyboard lines and "massive" choruses, "Monster" contains zombie-like metaphors and a reference to Gaga's debut single "Just Dance".

"Monster" received generally positive reviews from critics who appreciated the song's musical arrangement and frequently rated it as a top track from The Fame Monster, while some disliked its lyrics. "Monster" enjoyed brief commercial success in 2010, charting on four singles charts, as well as the Billboard Hot Dance Club Songs and Latin Pop Airplay. "Monster" was performed on Gaga's concert tours The Monster Ball (2009–11) and The Chromatica Ball (2022), with other performances including an appearance on The Oprah Winfrey Show and her 2014 residency show at Roseland Ballroom.

== Writing and production ==
"Monster" was written by Lady Gaga, RedOne and Space Cowboy, with RedOne producing the track. The song was recorded at the Record Plant Studio in Los Angeles. In an interview with MTV News, Gaga said that "Monster" describes her fear of sex and relationships and the literal meaning is about a "guy with a big dick". She elaborated, "It's the fear of attachment and the fear of loving something that's bad for you... If you listen to the lyrics, it's like being in love with the bad boy all the time, and you keep going back for more." Gaga added that the fear in "Monster" erupted from her need to have a stable relationship. She explained "I keep falling in love with the monster... But what I really need is the security and the safety and the womanhood, responsibility of my femininity. And so that's what that song is about."

== Composition ==
Monster
A snippet of the song, including male backing vocals.

A Europop and dance-pop song, "Monster" begins with Gaga's voice uttering the line, "Don't call me Gaga". It contains stuttering synths and 1980s drums that, according to PopMatters' Evan Sawdey, create a playful environment. The track uses heavy bass lines, descending keyboard lines and "massive" choruses, while a male voice sings about loving Gaga and expresses his wish of talking to her because she is "hot as hell". Gaga belts during the breakdown-like segment in the middle, which incorporates chiptune-like elements.

According to the sheet music published at Musicnotes.com by Sony/ATV Music Publishing, "Monster" is set in the time signature of common time, and composed in the key of C major, with a tempo of 120 beats per minute and Gaga's vocal range spanning from the low note of E_{3} to the high note of B_{4}. "Monster" has a basic sequence of F–G–Am–Em as its chord progression. Lyrically, "Monster" contains zombie-like metaphors about having one's heart eaten. The song also features references to "Just Dance", Gaga's debut single, with the line "I wanna ‘Just Dance’/ But he took me home instead". Michael Hubbard from MusicOMH believed that the lines in the last verse "get a bit gruesome at the end" with the lines saying "He tore my clothes right off/ He ate my heart and then he ate my brain."

== Critical reception ==
The song received generally positive reviews from critics. Michael Hubbard from MusicOMH called "Monster" "a potential single", praising its musical composition, but criticizing the lyrics. Evan Sawdey from PopMatters also criticized the metaphors contained in the lyrics of the song, but ultimately called it "one surprisingly effective pop cocktail". Ben Patashnik from NME felt that it was "slightly too disposable". Scott Plagenhoef of Pitchfork saw similarities between Gaga's voice on "Monster" and the work of Kylie Minogue. Brian Linder from IGN felt that the track was lighter compared to the other songs on The Fame Monster, and complimented the line "We French kissed on a subway train / He tore my clothes right off / He ate my heart and then he ate my brain", calling it a lyrical gem. He also added that "Monster" was a "dance floor riot". Jaime Gill from Yahoo! felt that "'Monster' is a squirmy little beast that wriggles into your brain slowly and is almost impossible to remove." Monica Herrera from Billboard called the song "80s adoring". A Vulture article considered "Monster" to be "among the best pop songs ever written about losing your innocence — how sex and intimacy can feel like you're being eaten alive." In 2022, NME's Nick Levine wrote about "Monster" that "it says a lot about Gaga's rock-solid songwriting at the start of her career that a 12-year-old deep cut still sounds like it should have been a single."

== Chart performance ==
In the United Kingdom, "Monster" debuted on the UK Singles Chart at 68, on December 12, 2009, but slipped off the chart the next week. On August 16, 2010, the song debuted at number 30 on the New Zealand Singles Chart due to digital downloads and radio airplay, and later peaked at number 29. The song was present on the chart for seven weeks. In Hungary, it debuted on the Mahasz Single Top 10 lista chart at number six on November 23, 2009, but fell off the next week. "Monster" debuted and peaked on the Australian ARIA Singles Chart at number 80 on the issue dated November 30, 2009. The song debuted on the United States Billboard Hot Dance Club Songs at number 49 on September 18, 2010, before moving to its highest position of number 29 on October 9, 2010, where it remained for another week. It fell off the chart after eight weeks. On the Latin Pop Airplay chart, the song was initially seen at number 32, and later peaked at number 22. "Monster" spent 14 weeks on the chart. According to Nielsen SoundScan, the song has sold 207,000 digital downloads in the US.

== Live performances ==
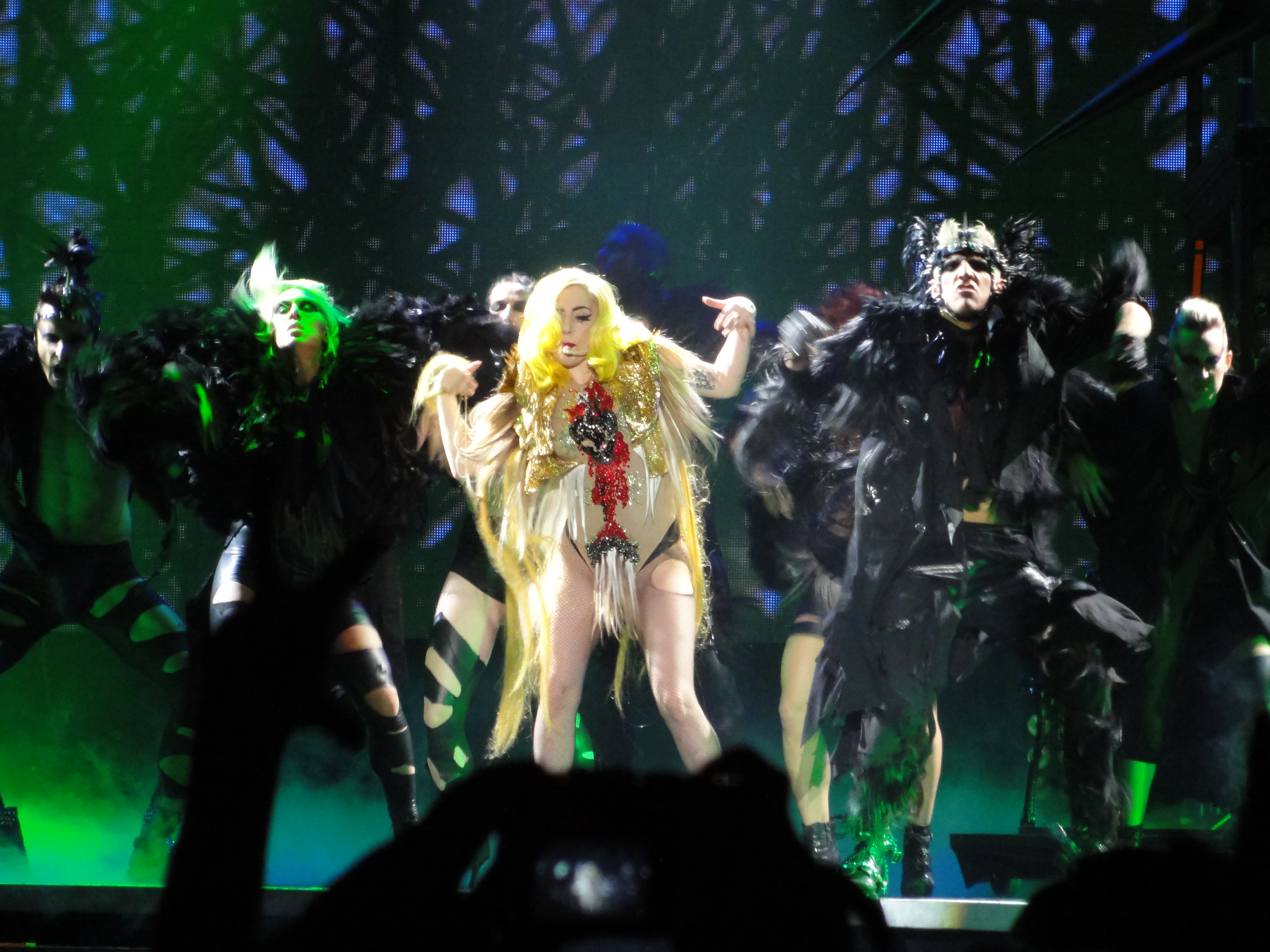
Gaga performing "Monster" during the 2010 shows of The Monster Ball Tour. She is seen here doing the Michael Jackson inspired choreography.

On January 15, 2010, Gaga performed "Monster" as part of a three-song medley on The Oprah Winfrey Show. The performance began with Gaga appearing on the stage wearing a dress, that looked both like a pantsuit and dress. Her hair was in spikes and she held a spiked ball and chain in her hand. "Monster" was the first song of the medley that she performed, others being "Bad Romance" and "Speechless". She also performed the song on all legs of The Monster Ball Tour. The performance was preceded by a video interlude featuring snarling dogs and brooding ravens. "Monster" began with Gaga emerging in a black feathered jacket and performing dance moves reminiscent of Michael Jackson. The backdrop featured the close-up of a black bird's wings.

During the 2010–2011 shows of the tour, the performance of "Monster" was revamped with new outfits and a new ending, which sees Gaga portrayed as getting killed by a murderer in blood, after which she lies "dying" in a pool of blood. Her performance of that scene in Manchester, England, triggered protests from family groups and fans in the aftermath of the Cumbria shootings, in which 12 people were murdered by a taxi driver. "What happened in Bradford is very fresh in people's minds and given all the violence which happened in Cumbria just hours earlier, it was insensitive," said Lynn Costello of Mothers Against Violence. Chris Rock later defended her flamboyant, provocative behavior. "Well, she's Lady Gaga," he said. "She's not 'Lady Behave Yourself.' Do you want great behavior from a person named Gaga? Is this what you were expecting?"

"Monster" was part of the setlist of Gaga's 2014 residency show, Lady Gaga Live at Roseland Ballroom. She performed the song while playing on a keytar decorated with red roses, wearing a crimson leather body suit. The intro of Gaga's Joanne World Tour (2017–2018) started with the line "Don't call me Gaga", taken from the song, before Gaga declaring that she instead wants to be called Joanne, and starting the show. In 2022, Gaga performed "Monster" at The Chromatica Ball stadium tour, retaining the choreography from the Monster Ball Tour. During the performance, Gaga put on an oversized red jacket which alluded to Michael Jackson's Thriller-era.

== Slayyyter cover ==
American singer Slayyyter released a cover of "Monster" on October 17, 2023, as a Spotify exclusive, recorded at the streaming service's New York City studios. She described "Monster" as one of her favorite pop songs and credited Lady Gaga's music with having a significant personal impact, stating that certain songs "saved [her] life".

== Credits and personnel ==
Credits adapted from the liner notes of The Fame Monster.

- Lady Gaga – vocals, songwriter, co-producer, vocal arrangement, background vocals
- Nadir "RedOne" Khayat – songwriter, producer, vocal editing, vocal arrangement, background vocals, audio engineering, instrumentation, programming, recording at Record Plant Studios, Los Angeles, California
- Nicolas Jean-Pierre Patrick "Space Cowboy" Dresti – songwriter, recording, background vocals
- Johnny Severin – vocal editing and audio engineering
- Dave Russel – audio engineering
- Robert Orton – audio mixing at Sarm Studios, London, England
- Gene Grimaldi – audio mastering at Oasis Mastering, Burbank, California

== Charts ==
=== Weekly charts ===
Weekly chart performance for "Monster"
Chart (2009–10)	Peak position
Australia (ARIA)	80
Canadian Digital Songs (Billboard)	73
Hungary (Single Top 40)	6
New Zealand (Recorded Music NZ)	29
Scottish Singles Sales (Official Charts)	55
UK Singles (Official Charts)	68
US Bubbling Under Hot 100 (Billboard)	12
US Dance Club Songs (Billboard)	29
US Dance/Electronic Digital Songs (Billboard)	20
US Latin Pop Airplay (Billboard)	22

=== Year-end charts ===
2010 year-end chart performance for "Monster"
Chart (2010)	Position
US Dance/Electronic Digital Songs (Billboard)	29

== Certifications ==
Certifications for "Monster"
Region	Certification	Certified units/sales
Australia (ARIA)	Gold	35,000^{‡}
New Zealand (RMNZ)	Gold	15,000^{‡}
United Kingdom (BPI)	Silver	200,000^{‡}
United States (RIAA)	Gold	500,000^{‡}
^{‡} Sales+streaming figures based on certification alone.
