= Flipsyde =

American hip hop group

- Origin: Oakland, California, United States
- Genres: Hip hop; rap rock; alternative hip hop; acoustic hip hop; alternative rock
- Years active: 2003–present
- Members: Steve Knight; Dave Lopez; The Piper (Jinho Ferreira)
- Past members: DJ D-Sharp; Chantelle Paige
- Website: Flipsyde.com

Flipsyde is an American hip hop group from Oakland, California.

== Career ==
Flipsyde currently consists of lead vocalist and guitarist Steve Knight, lead guitarist Dave Lopez, and rapper The Piper (Jinho Ferreira). Their 2005 debut album, We the People, was released by Interscope Records and featured the singles "Happy Birthday" and "Someday", with the latter chosen as a theme song by NBC for the 2006 Winter Olympic Games, and appeared on the soundtrack for the 2008 film Never Back Down.

Flipsyde's 2008 follow-up album, State of Survival, featured production by Akon and a minor hit in "When It Was Good", but the record did not chart. The group was subsequently dropped by Interscope Records. Flipsyde released two EP's independently in 2011 and 2012. The group is currently working on a new project together.

== Beyond Flipsyde ==
Ferreira is a graduate of San Francisco State University and has written two unproduced screenplays, one of which won a screenwriting prize at the Tribeca Film Festival in April 2009.

Ferreira discussed his experiences growing up, becoming a rapper, and choosing to become a cop to try to address racial injustice in From Oakland to Johannesburg: Can We Reform the Police?, an episode of World Affairs.

== Past members ==
- DJ D-Sharp (Derrick Robinson), a founding member of Flipsyde, departed after the release of We the People.
- Chantelle Paige joined the group for the album State of Survival. After the album she moved on to pursue a solo career.

== Discography ==
=== Studio albums ===
Year	Title	Chart position		Sales
Year	Title	US	US Heat.	Sales
2005	We the People: Released: July 12, 2005; Label: Cherrytree/Interscope; Format: CD	—	43	WW: — 62,000
2009	State of Survival: Released: 2009; Label: Cherrytree/Interscope; Format: CD	—	—	WW: 50,000
"—" denotes items which were not released in that country or failed to chart.

=== EPs ===
Year	Title	Chart position	
Year	Title	US	US Heat.
2011	The Phoenix: Released: July 26, 2011; Label: Flipsyde Music; Format: CD and digital download	—	—
2012	Tower of Hollywood: Released: September 11, 2012; Label: Flipsyde Music; Format: CD and digital download	—	—

=== Mixtapes ===
- The Pen and The Sword (2005)
- Focus (2011)
- Ignite (2012)
- Gift (2012)
- Transform (2012)

=== Singles ===
Title	Year	Peak chart positions										Album
Title	Year	US	CAN	FIN	AUT	SWE	GER	SWI	POL	DAN	SVK	Album
"Someday"	2005	—	—	10	—	28	49	—	—	—	—	We the People
"Happy Birthday" (feat. Piper)	2006	—	—	—	10	3	4	11	3	— (Note: "Happy Birthday" did not enter the Single Top-20, but peaked at number 11 on the Airplay Top-20 chart.)	59	We the People
"Trumpets (Never Be the Same Again)"	2006	—	—	11	54	—	26	—	—	—	86	We the People
"Angel"	2006	—	—	—	—	—	69	—	—	—	8	We the People
"Champion"	2008	—	—	—	—	—	—	—	—	—	—	State of Survival
"When It Was Good"	2009	—	92	—	—	7	42	—	9	35	31	State of Survival
"A Change"	2009	—	—	—	—	—	—	—	—	—	—	State of Survival
"Act Like A Cop Did It"	2011	—	—	—	—	—	—	—	—	—	—	The Phoenix
"Livin' It Up"	2011	—	—	—	—	—	—	—	—	—	—	The Phoenix
"One More Trip"	2012	—	—	—	—	—	—	—	—	—	—	Tower of Hollywood
"Believe"	2013	—	—	—	—	—	—	—	—	—	—	—
"—" denotes items which were not released in that country or failed to chart.

== See also ==
- List of former Interscope Records artists
