= Digital Rock (album) =

Studio album by Space Cowboy
- Released: 19 July 2006
- Recorded: 2006
- Length: 35:50
- Label: Tiger Trax
- Producer: Space Cowboy

Space Cowboy chronology
Big City Nights (2005)	Digital Rock (2006)	Falling Down Remix (2009)

Singles from Digital Rock Star
- 1. "My Egyptian Lover" Released: 22 January 2007

Digital Rock is the third studio album by French-English singer and producer Space Cowboy. It was released digitally on 31 July 2006 in Japan and physically on 29 January 2007 in the United Kingdom by Tiger Trax Records.

== Singles ==
The lead single "My Egyptian Lover", which features female singer-rapper and labelmate Nadia Oh, was playlisted on several radio stations, including BBC Radio 1, Kiss and Galaxy, with the hit video directed by James Sutton on frequent play on TV stations such as MTV. The single was released in the UK on 22 January 2007, reaching number forty-five on the UK Singles Chart.

== Track listing ==
No.	Title	Writer(s)	Producer(s)	Length
1.	"Intro!"	Nick Dresti	Space Cowboy	0:37
2.	"We Like to Party"	Dresti	Space Cowboy	4:01
3.	"Talking in Your Sleep"	Dresti	Space Cowboy	2:54
4.	"I Know What Girls Like"	Dresti, Chris Butler	Space Cowboy	3:46
5.	"Music Is My Life"	Dresti	Space Cowboy	3:46
6.	"Raise the Roof"	Dresti	Space Cowboy	2:13
7.	"That's What Dreams Are Made Of"	Dresti	Space Cowboy	2:16
8.	"Waiting 4 U" (Part I)	Dresti	Space Cowboy	3:11
9.	"Running Away"	Dresti	Space Cowboy	3:39
10.	"Waiting 4 U" (Part II)	Dresti	Space Cowboy	3:15
11.	"Sometimes"	Dresti	Space Cowboy	3:07
12.	"Computer Games"	Dresti	Space Cowboy	3:05
Total length:				35:50

Digital edition
No.	Title	Writer(s)	Producer(s)	Length
13.	"My Egyptian Lover" (featuring Nadia Oh)	Dresti	Space Cowboy	3:00
Total length:				38:50

Japanese edition
No.	Title	Writer(s)	Producer(s)	Length
13.	"My Egyptian Lover" (featuring Nadia Oh)	Dresti	Space Cowboy	2:38
14.	"So In Love With You"	Dresti	Space Cowboy	3:33
15.	"40 Thieves"	Dresti	Space Cowboy	5:00
Total length:				48:12

== Release history ==
Country	Date	Label	Format
Japan	19 July 2006	Sony	CD, digital download
United Kingdom	31 July 2006	Tiger Trax	Digital download
United Kingdom	29 January 2007	Tiger Trax	CD

== Personnel ==
- Nicolas Dresti - Composer, Engineer, Mixing, Multi Instruments, Producer, Programming, Vocals
- Chris Butler - Composer
- Jeff Knowler - Vocal Engineer
- George Miller - Technical Support, Web Design
- James Bryan Sutton - Artwork, Design
