= Hot Like Wow =

Studio album by Nadia Oh
- Released: 13 April 2008
- Recorded: 2006–2008
- Genre: Electropop, electro house, electro-grime, electro-hop, ghettotech
- Length: 33:32
- Label: Tiger Trax
- Producer: Space Cowboy

Nadia Oh chronology
Hot Like Wow (2008)	Colours (2011)

Alternative cover

Singles from Hot Like Wow
- 1. "My Egyptian Lover" Released: 22 January 2007; 2. "Something 4 the Weekend (club promo single)" Released: 4 April 2007; 3. "Hot Like Wow (club promo single)" Released: 7 March 2008; 4. "N.A.D.I.A. O.H. (promotional single)" Released: 31 March 2008; 5. "Got Your Number" Released: 22 May 2008; 6. "Rip It Up (promotional single)" Released: 29 February 2012

Professional ratings
Review scores
Source	Rating
The Phoenix	3.5/4 stars

Hot Like Wow is the debut album by British singer Nadia Oh. It was released in the United Kingdom on 13 April 2008 by Tiger Trax Records. It spawned four singles initially; "My Egyptian Lover", "Something for the Weekend", "N.A.D.I.A. O.H.", and "Got Your Number", all released between 2007 and 2008. Oh performed gigs in Tokyo to support the album. Although the album's final single was released in 2008, Oh released the album's fifth single, "Rip It Up", on 29 February 2012 via iTunes.

== Background ==
Entirely written and produced by Space Cowboy, the album includes two singles of his own in which Oh is featured: "My Egyptian Lover", released in January 2007, and "Something 4 the Weekend", released in March 2007. The first and only official single from the album was scheduled to be "Got Your Number".

"Got Your Number" was featured in the thirteenth episode of the first season of the television series Gossip Girl, entitled "The Thin Line Between Chuck and Nate", originally aired in the US on 9 January 2008 via The CW and in the UK on 19 June 2008 via ITV2. It was also included on the season's soundtrack, OMFGG – Original Music Featured on Gossip Girl No. 1. The song was also featured in the first episode of Japanese drama series Sunao ni Narenakute. "Hot Male" and "Bounce" were featured in an episode of Ugly Betty.

A music video for the track "N.A.D.I.A. O.H." was released on the video-sharing website YouTube. The song "Hot Like Wow" was used in a jazz-pop routine choreographed by Brian Friedman on the fifth season of the American dance reality show So You Think You Can Dance on 17 June 2009. Although the album's final single was released in 2008, Oh released a fifth and final single, "Rip It Up", on 29 February 2012 via iTunes.

== Singles ==
"My Egyptian Lover" was released 22 January 2007 as the first single. It peaked within the top 50 of the UK Singles chart and is still her highest-charting single. "Something for the Weekend" followed over a year later released 8 March 2008 in an EP with "Hot Like Wow". The third single, "N.A.D.I.A. O.H." was released later that month to positive reception from her fans, it was however a buzz track and was never officially released aside from being purchasable from the album. "Got Your Number", served as the first original single, exclusive to the album and was scheduled to be released in the summer of 2008 yet plans fell through where Oh proceeded to record her second studio album. Through iTunes, the fifth single, "Rip It Up", was released 29 February 2012 along with an instrumental track.

== Track listing ==
All tracks are written and produced by Nicolas Dresti.

No.	Title	Length
1.	"Hot Like Wow"	3:23
2.	"My Egyptian Lover" (featuring Space Cowboy)	2:22
3.	"Hot Male"	2:29
4.	"Bounce"	2:28
5.	"City Nights"	3:58
6.	"Rip It Up" (featuring Space Cowboy)	1:39
7.	"That Kind of Girl"	3:23
8.	"Got Your Number" (featuring Space Cowboy)	3:07
9.	"N.A.D.I.A. O.H."	2:38
10.	"Shake It"	2:03
11.	"S.E.X."	3:20
12.	"Something 4 the Weekend" (featuring Space Cowboy)	2:36
Total length:		33:32

Digital bonus track
No.	Title	Length
13.	"Freak"	2:38
Total length:		36:10

Japanese CD edition bonus track
No.	Title	Length
14.	"My Egyptian Lover" (Loose Cannons Luxurious Remix (remix/additional production by Kaiser Saucy & Lord Fader))	6:47
Total length:		42:57

== Release history ==
Country	Date	Label	Format
United Kingdom	13 April 2008	Tiger Trax Records	Digital download
Japan	4 February 2009	Avex Trax	CD
