= Colours (Nadia Oh album) =

Studio album by Nadia Oh
- Released: 8 May 2011 (Original); 18 September 2011 (Re-release)
- Recorded: 2009–11
- Genre: Electropop, electro house, moombahton, electro-grime, ghettotech
- Length: 32:26 (Original); 45:49 (Re-release)
- Label: Tiger Trax
- Producer: Space Cowboy

Nadia Oh chronology
Hot Like Wow (2008)	Colours (2011)

Singles from Colours
- 1. "Follow Me" Released: 3 September 2009; 2. "Amsterdam" Released: 25 September 2009; 3. "Colours" Released: 26 November 2010; 4. "Taking Over the Dancefloor" Released: 24 April 2011; 5. "I Like It Loud" Released: 1 June 2011; 6. "No Bueno" Released: 21 August 2011

Colours is the second and final studio album by British singer Nadia Oh. It was released in the United Kingdom and the United States on 8 May 2011 by Tiger Trax Records. Numerous viral videos have been released through the video-sharing website YouTube to promote the album as well as multiple fan promo videos. Like Oh's debut effort, the album only spawned one main single, "Taking Over the Dancefloor", released digitally on 24 April 2011, However Colours was re-released on 18 September 2011 to include four new tracks: "No Bueno" (which acted as the album's second single released, 21 August), "Shade", "I Like It Loud", and "Follow Me".

== Background ==
The album released 8 May 2011 was preceded by three tracks, Amsterdam Dub Version on 25 September 2009, Follow Me to the Dancefloor on 3 September 2009 and Colours, made viral in late November 2011. First single, Taking Over The Dancefloor gained recognition from DJ Scott Mills who gave it its first commercial play on Radio One, where it was also Popjustice's song of the day. Second single, No Bueno also gained Song of The Day stature on Popjustice.

== Release ==
The albums original release was on 8 May 2011 featuring only 10 tracks including first single; Taking Over The Dancefloor and Promo Single; Colours. It later saw a re-release 18 September 2011 to include "No Bueno" (which acted as the album's second single released, 21 August), "Shade", "I Like It Loud", and "Follow Me", which the latter was released as a buzz track in 2009 under the title, Follow Me to the Dancefloor and failed to be included on the first release.

=== Music Videos ===
For promotion purposes several videos were made viral consisting of 'Oh performing select album tracks. The first being Jump Out The Window on 22 April 2011. In this video she is seen in front of ever-changing colour backgrounds while the song's lyrics scroll across the bottom of the screen with intercepting scenes of 'Oh being interviewed. Second promo video, Amsterdam made viral the very next day and in the similar fashion only without the interview and with darker colours. The final promo video was Soopermodel on 1 June 2011 and also followed the similar style of the previous videos.

== Singles ==
Colours was scheduled to be released 23 January 2011 but was later cancelled in favour of Taking Over The Dancefloor. Released 24 April under the original title of Kate Middleton, it is notably for its use of the genre Moombahton. No further singles were released until the album saw a re-issue with four new tracks, one of which being No Bueno, the second single. It was released on 21 August 2011 in the form of an EP.

== Track listing ==
No.	Title	Length
1.	"Hocus Pocus"	3:56
2.	"Is That You"	2:45
3.	"Jump (Out the Window)"	3:40
4.	"Taking Over the Dancefloor"	6:10
5.	"Soopermodel"	2:48
6.	"So Unforgettable"	1:23
7.	"Amsterdam"	2:43
8.	"Beauty & a Beast"	2:53
9.	"Colours"	3:14
10.	"DJ's Girlfriend"	2:54
Total length:		32:26

Re-release
No.	Title	Length
1.	"Colours"	3:14
2.	"Amsterdam"	2:43
3.	"Beauty & a Beast"	2:53
4.	"DJ's Girlfriend"	2:54
5.	"Is That You"	2:45
6.	"No Bueno"	3:09
7.	"Jump (Out the Window)"	3:40
8.	"Hocus Pocus"	3:56
9.	"Shade"	4:19
10.	"Soopermodel"	2:48
11.	"I Like It Loud"	2:39
12.	"Taking Over the Dancefloor"	6:10
13.	"So Unforgettable"	1:23
14.	"Follow Me"	2:43
Total length:		45:49

== Release history ==
Country	Date	Label(s)	Format(s)	Edition(s)
United Kingdom	8 May 2011	Tiger Trax Records	Digital download	Standard
United Kingdom	18 September 2011	Tiger Trax Records	Digital download	Re-Issue
