= Big City Nights (Scorpions album) =

Compilation album by Scorpions
- Released: 11 July 1998
- Recorded: 1980–1995
- Genre: Heavy metal, hard rock
- Length: 49:51
- Label: Universal Special Products/Rebound

Scorpions compilations chronology
Hot & Slow: Best Masters of the 70's (1998)	Big City Nights (1998)	Best (1999)

Professional ratings
Review scores
Source	Rating
Allmusic	2/5 stars

Big City Nights is a compilation album by the German heavy metal band Scorpions, released in 1998.

The song "No One Like You" is listed as a live version on the album. However, on some pressings, the track is replaced with the studio version.

== Track listing ==
1. "Big City Nights" - 4:09 (from the album Love at First Sting - 1984)
2. "Animal Magnetism" - 5:57 (from the album Animal Magnetism - 1980)
3. "Send Me an Angel" - 4:43 (from the album Crazy World - 1990)
4. "Rock You Like a Hurricane" (live) - 4:13 (from the album World Wide Live - 1985)
5. "Still Loving You" (live) - 5:49 (from the album World Wide Live)
6. "No One Like You" (live) - 4:09 (from the album World Wide Live)
7. "Wind of Change" (live) - 5:45 (from the album Live Bites - 1995)
8. "Kicks After Six" - 3:49 (from the album Crazy World)
9. "Rhythm of Love" - 3:48 (from the album Savage Amusement - 1988)
10. "No Pain, No Gain" - 3:54 (from the album Face the Heat - 1993)
11. "Can't Live Without You" - 3:45 (from the album Blackout - 1982)
