= Across the Sky (album) =

Studio album by Space Cowboy
- Released: 3 November 2003
- Recorded: 2002–2003
- Genres: Electronica, house, synthpop
- Length: 45:53
- Labels: Southern Fried; Epic Japan
- Producer: Space Cowboy

Space Cowboy chronology
Across the Sky (2003)	Big City Nights (2005)

Singles from Across the Sky
- 1. "I Would Die 4 U" Released: 1 January 2002; 2. "Just Put Your Hand In Mine" Released: 21 July 2003

Across the Sky is the debut studio album by the French-British singer and producer Space Cowboy. It was released in 2003 through Southern Fried Records. The album contains the singles "I Would Die 4 U" and "Just Put Your Hand in Mine".

== Track listing ==
No.	Title	Length
1.	"Crazy Talk" (acoustic version)	2:07
2.	"Funky Love"	3:29
3.	"All 'bout Money"	2:28
4.	"Love Is the Reason"	4:36
5.	"Crazy Talk"	2:56
6.	"Just Put Your Hand in Mine"	4:49
7.	"Prove Me Wrong"	4:49
8.	"So You Like What You See"	3:43
9.	"I Don't Care"	3:11
10.	"Cuttin' N' Scratchin'"	4:48
11.	"Always and Forever"	3:35
12.	"I Would Die 4 U"	5:22
Total length:		45:53

Japanese bonus tracks
No.	Title	Length
13.	"Jump"	4:01
14.	"Let's Get It Poppin'"	7:53
Total length:		57:47

== Release history ==
Country	Date	Label	Format
United Kingdom	November 3, 2003	Southern Fried	CD, digital download
Japan	May 19, 2004	Epic Japan	CD, digital download
