= Big City Nights (Space Cowboy album) =

Studio album by Space Cowboy
- Released: 22 June 2005
- Length: 39:38
- Labels: Sony Music Entertainment; Epic Japan; Tiger Trax
- Producer: Space Cowboy

Space Cowboy chronology
Across the Sky (2003)	Big City Nights (2005)	Digital Rock (2006)

Big City Nights is the second studio album by the French-British singer and producer Space Cowboy. It is the second full-length release by the artist and was released on 22 June 2005.

== Track listing ==
No.	Title	Length
1.	"Welcome!" (Intro)	0:39
2.	"I Remember When + Breaker Breaks"	3:54
3.	"Shaker Baby"	3:34
4.	"These Dreams"	4:11
5.	"Space Cowboy"	5:01
6.	"Like A Train + Stars 'N' Stripes"	4:09
7.	"The Hustler"	2:17
8.	"Across the Sky"	3:09
9.	"Uno, Dos, Tres + Digital Boogie"	4:07
10.	"I Wanna Go Back"	2:22
11.	"Big City Nights + Hard Rock Hams"	5:24
12.	"Superheroes Theme" (Outro)	0:51
Total length:		39:38

Japanese bonus tracks
No.	Title	Length
13.	"Are You Gonna Go My Way"	3:44
14.	"Still Got Love 4 U"	2:40
15.	"On The Dancefloor"	2:25
Total length:		48:27

== Release history ==
Country	Date	Label	Format
Japan	22 June 2005	Sony / Epic Japan	CD, digital download
United Kingdom	1 November 2005	Tiger Trax	CD, digital download

== Personnel ==
- Nicolas Dresti - Composer, Instrumentation, Mixing, Producer, Programming, Scratching, Vocals
- Matt Hughes - Drums
- Rosie Cole - Composer, Guest Appearance
- James Cruz - Mastering
- Lenny Kravitz - Composer
- Kele Le Roc - Guest Appearance
- George Miller - Technical Support
