= Falling Down (Space Cowboy song) =

Single by Space Cowboy featuring Chelsea Korka

from the album Digital Rock Star
- Released: 15 May 2009 (UK)
- Recorded: 2008
- Genre: Electropop
- Length: 2:58
- Label: Cherrytree Records
- Songwriter(s): Nicolas Dresti, Red One
- Producer(s): Nicolas Dresti, Red One, Cherry Cherry Boom Boom

Space Cowboy singles chronology
"Something 4 the Weekend" (2007)	"Falling Down" (2009)	"I Came 2 Party" (2009)

"Falling Down" is the first single from Space Cowboy's album, "Digital Rock Star". It was written and co-produced by RedOne and Nick Dresti. It features Chelsea Korka from the Paradiso Girls providing guest vocals, while the video shows the entire group dancing. The track was released as the album's lead single on 19 May 2009 throughout Europe, after being leaked in April.

== Track listing ==
No.	Title	Length
1.	"Falling Down" (featuring Chelsea Korka)	2:58
2.	"Falling Down" (featuring Chelsea Korka) (Shine DJs Remix)	3:35
3.	"Falling Down (Party Rock Remix)" (featuring LMFAO)	3:01
Total length:		9:34

== Music video ==
The music video is set in a club scene with a colourful backdrop and features Space Cowboy and Chelsea Korka dancing, along with the rest of Korka's band, the Paradiso Girls however, only Korka is featured vocally on the single. Colby O'Donis is also featured non-vocally in the video. (He is seen briefly dancing with Chelsea a few times)

The video can be seen here at the Cherrytree Record website.

== Falling Down Remix EP ==
Falling Down Remix

EP by Space Cowboy
- Released: 25 August 2009
- Genre: Electronic, dance, house, pop
- Length: 11:11
- Label: Cherrytree Records

Space Cowboy chronology
Digital Rock (2006)	Falling Down Remix (2009)	Digital Rock Star (2009)

Falling Down Remix is the first extended play by the French-born English recording artist Space Cowboy. It contains remixes by Frankmusik, Robots to Mars, and Space Cowboy himself. It was released by Cherrytree Records on 25 August 2009.

No.	Title	Length
1.	"Falling Down" (Frankmusik Remix)	3:37
2.	"Falling Down" (Robots To Mars Mix)	3:10
3.	"Falling Down" (Space Cowboy Remix)	4:24
Total length:		11:11

== Charts ==
Chart (2009)	Peak position
German Singles Chart	63
UK Dance Singles Chart	3
Swedish Singles Chart	27
