= Nadia Oh =

British former singer, rapper, producer and model

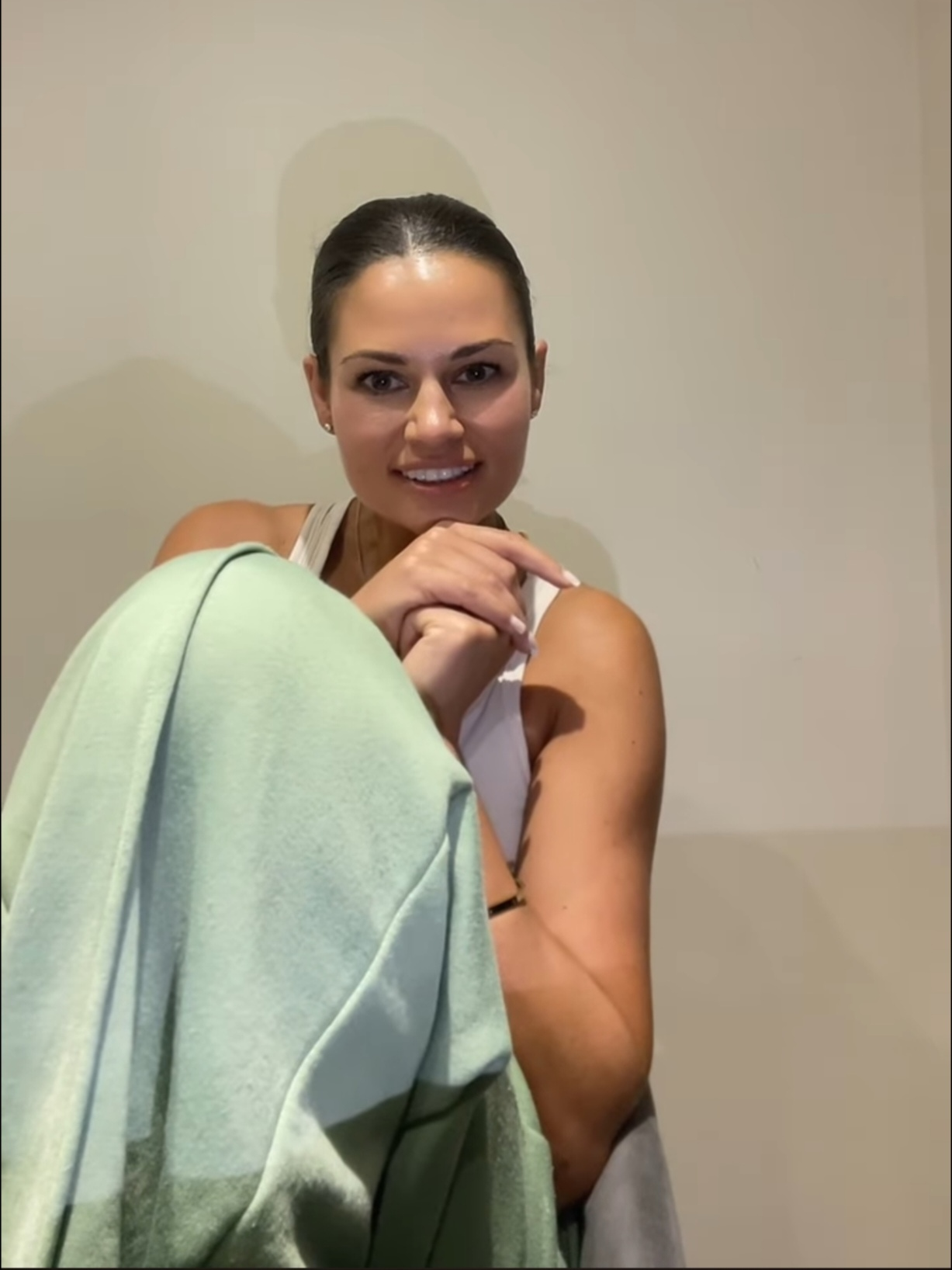
- Oh in 2025

Background information
- Born: Nadia Georgina Oates; 26 May 1990 (age 36); London, England
- Genres: Electropop; electro house; grime; ghettotech; moombahton
- Occupations: Singer; rapper; producer; model; aesthetician
- Years active: 2006–2012
- Labels: Tiger Trax; Avex Trax
- Website: www.nadiaoh.com

Nadia Georgina Oates (born 26 May 1990), known professionally as Nadia Oh, is a former British singer, rapper, producer and model. She was featured on Space Cowboy's 2007 single "My Egyptian Lover". She has since released two studio albums—Hot Like Wow (2008) and Colours (2011)—both entirely produced by Space Cowboy.

== History ==
=== Hot Like Wow, 2007 to 2008 ===
Oh's debut album Hot Like Wow was produced by Space Cowboy and released in the United Kingdom on 13 April 2008 by Tiger Trax Records, with songs featured on the American TV shows Ugly Betty, Gossip Girl and So You Think You Can Dance. On 16 July 2011, the title track "Hot Like Wow" was featured on So You Think You Can Dance for the second time. The album was preceded by three singles: "My Egyptian Lover", "Something 4 The Weekend" and "N.A.D.I.A Oh" from 2007 to 2008. The album was however supported by the release of the single, "Got Your Number", that bought her international attention on the American TV series, Gossip Girl.

=== Colours, 2009 to 2012 ===
Oh worked once again with Space Cowboy on her second studio album, Colours, released on 8 May 2011. Singles from the album, "Taking Over the Dancefloor" (originally titled "Kate Middleton"), which received airplay on BBC Radio 1's The Scott Mills Show, and "No Bueno", showcase a moombahton style and were named Song of the Day by Popjustice on 21 March and 27 June 2011, respectively. Colours was re-issued in September 2011 to include "No Bueno", "Shade", "I Like It Loud" and "Follow Me".

Oh had been working on new music since mid-late 2011, with two tracks being released on SoundCloud as free downloads so far; "Vampire Night" featuring Space Cowboy and "Fqn Amazing". In early 2012, she released "Slapper (Ayye)" through iTunes however since this she has not released any new material.

=== 2013–present: Hiatus, modelling and legacy ===
Since 2012, Oh has retired from music, stating in 2025 that she "doesn't think she'd be able to [return to music]". A song called "Radio Religion" was slated to release in October 2012, but was not released. Following her retirement from music she briefly pursued a career in modelling. As of 2026, Oh works as a skin/microneedling specialist and HiFU practitioner at TAG Aesthetics in Leigh-on-Sea.

In 2025, she joined TikTok and discussed her career for the first time since her retirement.

== Legacy and influence ==
In a September 2019 interview with Paper, Liz stated that her track "Lottery" was an ode to Nadia Oh and that Oh's work with Space Cowboy paved the way for contemporary "pop girls". Her music is often cited online as a pre-cursor to the hyperpop sound that would be developed by PC Music.

== Discography ==
=== Albums ===
- Hot Like Wow (2008)
- Colours (2011)

=== Singles ===
Year	Single	Chart		Album
Year	Single	UK	UK dance	Album
2007	"My Egyptian Lover" (Space Cowboy featuring Nadia Oh)	45	12	Hot Like Wow
2007	"Something 4 the Weekend" (Space Cowboy featuring Nadia Oh)	—	—	Hot Like Wow
2008	"Got Your Number" (featuring Space Cowboy)	—	—	Hot Like Wow
2011	"Taking Over the Dancefloor"	188	30	Colours
2011	"No Bueno"	123	54	Colours
2012	"Slapper (Ayye)"	109	—	—
2012	"FQN Amazing"	—	—	—
2012	"Vampire Night"	—	—	—

==== Promotional singles ====
- "N.A.D.I.A. O.H." (2008)
- "I Like It Loud" (2011)
- "Shade" (2011)
- "Rip It Up" (2012)
