= Space Cowboy (musician) =

French-British singer

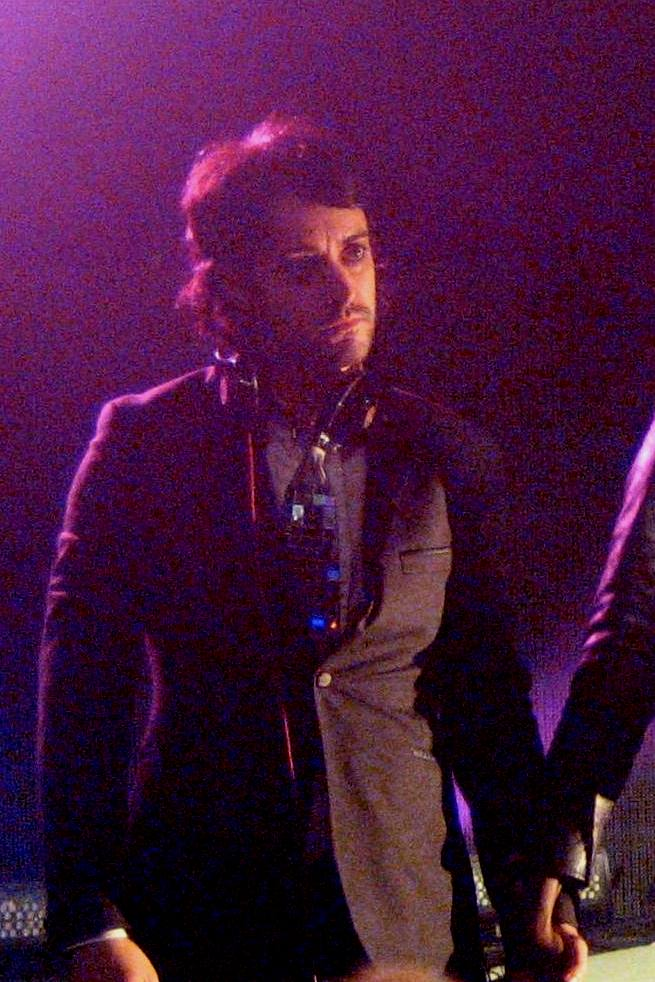
- Dresti in 2008

Background information
- Also known as: DJ Supreme; DJ Chrome; Kings of Rhythm; Loop Da Loop; Nicky Fabulous; Mission Accomplished; Vibes
- Born: Nicolas Jean-Pierre Patrick Dresti; 5 March 1975 (age 51); Nogent-sur-Seine, France
- Origin: London, England
- Genres: Electronic; house; big beat; hip-hop
- Occupations: Producer; DJ; songwriter
- Years active: 1992–2014
- Labels: Southern Fried; Tiger Trax; Cherrytree; Interscope; Xenomania

Nicolas Jean-Pierre Patrick Dresti (born 5 March 1975), better known by his stage name Space Cowboy, is a French-British singer-songwriter, DJ, and producer. He is best known for his collaborations with Lady Gaga.

Born in France and raised in England, Dresti first recorded in 1992 under the names of Vibes and DJ Apex, releasing breakbeat hardcore tracks. He then changed his stage name to Nicky Fabulous and produced a four track extended play, Pussy Galore in 1995. He has recorded under various pseudonyms including: DJ Supreme, Kings of Rhythm, Loop Da Loop, and DJ Chrome. In 2002, Dresti changed his stage name to Space Cowboy and did a cover of Prince's song, "I Would Die 4 U." In 2003, Space Cowboy debuted his first studio album Across the Sky. On 22 June 2005, he released his second full-length album Big City Nights and his third album, Digital Rock, the next year. Digital Rock Star, a re-release of Digital Rock, debuted as his fourth studio album on 20 October 2009.

== Early life ==
Dresti was born in Nogent-sur-Seine, France and raised in England. He started doing his early work while he was in college studying audio engineering. After college Dresti went to work in a studio and the senior owner called him Space Cowboy all the time.

== Music career ==
=== DJ Supreme (1996–1998) ===
Dresti changed his stage name to DJ Supreme in 1996. While under that stage name, he released a single, "Tha Wildstyle", on 31 December 1996 through Distinct'ive Records. The single also included six remixes of that song. It was one of four UK chart hits as DJ Supreme, the other three being "Enter the Scene" (with Rhythm Masters), "Tha Horns of Jericho" and "Up to the Wildstyle" (with the Porn Kings).

=== Loop Da Loop (1996–2002) ===
Dresti was also known as Loop Da Loop from 1996, releasing house, speed garage and big beat records and remixes on the Manifesto label. He scored two UK chart hits with "Go with the Flow" in 1997 and "Hazel" in 1999.

=== DJ Chrome (2002) ===
As DJ Chrome, Dresti released a version of Journey's "Who's Crying Now" on Perfecto which reached No. 83 in the UK.

=== Space Cowboy (2002–present) ===
As Space Cowboy, he released his first official single, a cover of Prince's song, "I Would Die 4 U" on 1 January 2002. The single peaked at number 55 on the UK Singles Chart. This was the only single from his first album, Across the Sky which was released on 3 November 2003 though Southern Fried Records and Epic Japan. Another single was released, "Just Put Your Hand in Mine", on 21 July 2003. This song peaked on the UK Singles Chart at number 71. His second album, Big City Nights was released on 22 June 2005 through Sony Music Entertainment Japan and Epic Japan. His third studio album, Digital Rock was released on 19 July 2006 though Sony and Tiger Trax. Space Cowboy's third, fourth and fifth singles, "My Egyptian Lover", "Falling Down" and "I Came 2 Party" was released throughout 2009 to debut his fourth studio album, Digital Rock Star which was released 20 October 2009 by UMG, Cherrytree, Interscope and Tiger Trax. "My Egyptian Lover" peaked on the UK Singles Chart at number 45. In 2010, Electro Pioneers (Interscope, Tiger Trax), the second extended play, was released on 12 January 2010.

Space Cowboy is known to be the DJ for Lady Gaga. He was the featured artist and co-producer on "Starstruck" for the album The Fame. The two collaborated on the promotional single "Christmas Tree". He also remixed some of Lady Gaga's songs, including "Just Dance", "LoveGame" and "Poker Face". He also worked with her on her second album The Fame Monster, co-writing and producing the tracks "Monster" and "So Happy I Could Die" with Lady Gaga and RedOne. Space Cowboy also appeared in the Lady Gaga music videos for "Just Dance", "Beautiful, Dirty, Rich" and "Poker Face".

He also produced two albums by Nadia Oh, Hot Like Wow (2008) and Colours (2011) and co-wrote MSTRKRFT's song "Heartbreaker" featuring American singer John Legend.

Dresti has also co-written songs for the Saturdays ("All Fired Up"), Mac Miller ("All Around the World") and Frankmusik ("No I.D.").

== Discography ==
- Across the Sky (2003)
- Big City Nights (2005)
- Digital Rock (2006)
- Digital Rock Star (2009)

== Awards ==
=== Grammy Awards ===
Space Cowboy has been nominated for one Grammy Award in 2010 for his appearance on Lady Gaga's album The Fame.

Year	Nominee / work	Award	Result
2010	The Fame (as featured artist and Producer)	Album of the Year	Nominated
2011	The Fame Monster (as Producer)	Album of the Year	Nominated
