= My Egyptian Lover =

Single by Space Cowboy featuring Nadia Oh

from the album Digital Rock and Hot Like Wow
- Released: 22 January 2007
- Recorded: 2006
- Genre: Electro house
- Length: 2:22
- Label: Tiger Trax
- Songwriter: Space Cowboy
- Producer: Space Cowboy

Space Cowboy singles chronology
"I Would Die 4 U" (2002)	"My Egyptian Lover" (2007)	"Something 4 the Weekend" (2007)

"My Egyptian Lover" is the lead single from French-British musician Space Cowboy's third studio album, Digital Rock (2006). It features British singer Nadia Oh and has been playlisted on BBC Radio 1, Kiss and Galaxy FM, with support from DJ Scott Mills, who made it his "Record of the Week". "My Egyptian Lover" is also included on Oh's debut studio album, Hot Like Wow. It was released with remixes by the Loose Cannons, Ben Macklin, Paul Jackson, and Rogerseventytwo. The song was also used heavily by the American singer Lady Gaga throughout 2008 to promote her singles "Just Dance" and "Poker Face", to which the song's producer partook in the promotion.

== Track listing ==
UK CD single

1. "My Egyptian Lover" (Original Radio Edit) – 2:23
2. "My Egyptian Lover" (Extended Club Mix) – 2:59
3. "My Egyptian Lover" (Loose Cannons 'Luxorious' Mix) – 6:46
4. "My Egyptian Lover" (Video) – 2:27

== Charts ==
Chart performance for "My Egyptian Lover"
Chart (2007)	Peak position
UK Singles (Official Charts)	45
UK Dance (Official Charts)	12
UK Indie (Official Charts)	2
