= Martin Kierszenbaum =

- Born: 1967 (age 58–59)
- Occupations: Record executive; songwriter; record producer
- Title: Chairman of the Cherrytree Music Company

Martin Kierszenbaum, also known by his pseudonym Cherry Cherry Boom Boom, is an American songwriter, musician, music producer and record executive. He founded Cherrytree Records (or The Cherrytree Music Company) in 2005, a record label and management company through which he has signed artists including Lady Gaga, Sting, Keane, LMFAO, Disclosure, Ellie Goulding, Far East Movement, Feist, La Roux, the Knux, Robyn, t.A.T.u., and Natalia Kills. He has been credited on releases by Madonna, Mylène Farmer, Tokio Hotel, Feist, Ai, Samantha Fish, and Alexandra Burke.

Kierszenbaum releases music under his own name and his stage name Cherry Cherry Boom Boom.

== Biography ==
Kierszenbaum grew up studying piano. He lived in Argentina, UK and continental Europe before eventually moving to New Haven, Connecticut. He then moved to Michigan.

He graduated from the University of Michigan with a B.A. in Music, Spanish Literature, and Communication. He then went on to the Annenberg School of University of Southern California to complete his Master’s degree in communications management.

== Career ==
Kierszenbaum co-founded independent record label Arb Recordings, which released the hip-hop duo Maroon, which he also co-founded under the moniker Mk Chilly Dog. The band existed 1985–1994.

Kierszenbaum then got a job at the PolyGram Music Group mailroom. During 1989-1991 he worked as an international publicity manager at Warner Bros. Records. Later, he worked as publicist in the international division of A&M Records and by 1998 he was working for its new owner Interscope Records (Universal's unit) as the head of international marketing. Kierszenbaum was promoted to head of international operations and was responsible for discovering and signing non-American artists. His idea to promote t.A.T.u's single "All the Things She Said", whose lyrics he wrote, in Japan through karaoke bars led to 1.7 mil copies sold in the country. He promoted Eminem and Limp Bizkit on the European market.

In 2005, he founded the music management, record label and publishing firm Cherrytree Music Company.

He was also working as President of A&R Pop/Rock at Interscope Records and head of international operations at Interscope Geffen A&M Records. There he signed Lady Gaga, LMFAO, Disclosure and t.A.T.u.

== Music ==
Kierszenbaum wrote and produced songs for 200 km/h in the Wrong Lane by t.A.T.u. He also wrote and produced on Lady Gaga's debut album The Fame.

His pseudonym, Cherry Cherry Boom Boom, is referred to in the Lady Gaga songs "Christmas Tree", "Eh, Eh (Nothing Else I Can Say)", "The Fame", "I Like It Rough" and "Starstruck". Also in the song "I Wanna Touch You" by Colby O'Donis and "White Flag" by Far East Movement featuring Kayla Kai, from their album Free Wired. It is also referenced in some of Space Cowboy's music such as his singles "Falling Down", "I Came 2 Party" (that featured Cinema Bizarre), and the first part of his pseudonym "cherry cherry" is referred to in "Not in Love" by Natalia Kills.

He featured on a remix of Far East Movement's "Like a G6" with Colette Carr called "G6 (V6 Reflip)". He also features on backing vocals on “Eh, Eh (Nothing Else I Can Say)” by Lady Gaga and "Not In Love", a track from Natalia Kills's debut album, Perfectionist. Kierszenbaum is also a co-writer on Halsey's "Nightmare" (2019).

Kierszenbaum produced Sting's "57th & 9th" album, several songs on the GRAMMY-award-winning "44/876" album by Sting & Shaggy, Mylène Farmer's platinum "Interstellaires" album and the Samantha Fish album “Faster.” He also co-produced Sting's “The Bridge” album with Sting.

Kierszenbaum produced and co-wrote many of the songs on the 2021 Samantha Fish album Faster.
