= So Happy I Could Die =

2009 Song by Lady Gaga

Song by Lady Gaga

from the EP The Fame Monster
- Released: November 18, 2009
- Recorded: 2009
- Studio: Record Plant (Los Angeles)
- Genre: Europop
- Length: 3:55
- Label: Streamline; KonLive; Cherrytree; Interscope
- Songwriters: Lady Gaga; RedOne; Space Cowboy
- Producers: RedOne; Lady Gaga; Space Cowboy

Audio video
- "So Happy I Could Die" on YouTube

"So Happy I Could Die" is a song from American singer Lady Gaga, taken from her second major release and her third EP, The Fame Monster (2009). It was written and produced by herself, Nadir "RedOne" Khayat, and Nicolas "Space Cowboy" Dresti. Inspired by Gaga's fear of what she described as the "Alcohol Monster", the song is about the influences of alcoholism, and also explores several sexual themes in its lyrics as well as liberalism. Musically, it is a Europop song with Auto-Tune effects.

Upon the release of The Fame Monster, "So Happy I Could Die" received mostly positive reviews, with critics complimenting its sexual nature. The song charted in Hungary, Sweden, and the United Kingdom, despite not being released as a single. Live performances for the song transpired during The Monster Ball Tour (2009–2011), during which Gaga wore a mechanically controlled moving dress while singing the song.

== Background and recording ==
Lady Gaga collaborated with RedOne and Space Cowboy in writing and producing "So Happy I Could Die". All three were the main instrumentalists behind the song and recorded it at Record Plant Studios in Los Angeles. Other personnel who worked on the song includes Johny Severin for vocal editing and audio engineering, Dave Russell for audio engineering and Mike Orton for mixing the song at Sarm West Studios. An occasional drinker, the song represents Gaga's fear of what she describes as the "Alcohol Monster", as evident of several lyrics in the song, such as the chorus; "Happy in the club with a bottle of red wine, stars in our eyes cause we're having a good time." In an interview with MTV, Gaga professed that the song is about the euphoric effects of alcohol—the so-called "happy place"—and explained that her fear is split between two songs. "My fear of alcohol. My fear of drugs... fear of addiction. [...] But alcohol is funny because it takes you down to this very happy place and just like forgetting all your problems and for just a minute you're so happy, and then all of a sudden, [your] stomach turns and go way down... And that's my relationship with consumption and abuse." Other meaning behind the song was given by a writer for Elle magazine, which described it as "about masturbating while thinking about a woman". While writing the song, Gaga was inspired by English singer Lily Allen and Tasmin Archer's hit "Sleeping Satellite" (1992).

== Music and lyrical interpretation ==
"So Happy I Could Die" is a mid-tempo Europop song, makes use of an Auto-Tune effect. According to the music sheet published by Sony/ATV Music Publishing on the website Musicnotes.com, the song is written in the time signature of common time, and is composed in the key of A minor with a tempo of 100 beats per minute. Gaga's voice ranges from the tonal nodes of A_{3} to A_{4} and the song follows a basic sequence of F–G–Em–Am as its chord progression. As Gaga sings the chorus, its melody emulates Natasha Bedingfield's "Pocketful of Sunshine" (2008). Paul Lester of BBC suggested that "So Happy I Could Die" is reflective of the LGBT themes common in Gaga's songs, while Slant Magazine journalist Sal Cinquemani asserted that it telegraphed the "instructive" execution of the singer's rejection of "any and all intimacy with others". "'So Happy I Could Die' is a love song," he remarked, "but the object of her affection is herself—looking at herself, drinking with herself, dancing with herself, touching herself."

Academic Jennifer M. Woolston found parallels between the song and the fairy tale "Little Red Riding Hood". She noted that through the song's lyrics, Gaga embodied both the young girl as well as the "ravenous" wolf. Gaga acts as the viewer, the drinker as well as the sexual aggressor. In the book, The Performance Identities of Lady Gaga, Woolston writes:

In the wilderness of the dance floor, Gaga recognizes the wolf-woman she has become and refuses to misrepresent herself any longer. She notes that in the quiet of the night, despite falsehoods and tears, she can feel satisfaction by touching herself. By stroking herself and perhaps her metaphorical wolf-pelt, Gaga is engaging in a moment of self-acceptance and self-soothing. Lady Gaga realizes that it will be difficult to maintain her dualistic nature, and alludes to upcoming death when she tells audiences that she is so content that she would welcome death. These words appear to foreshadow the end of [The Fame Monster], as the singer alludes to a calm acceptance of her spiritual/ghostly side.

Comparisons between the song and Britney Spears's "Touch of My Hand" from the latter's fourth studio album In the Zone (2003) were made by music critics. However, Bradley Stern of the music website MuuMuse remarked that its lyrics and music were "too dark to place [it] in the same realm as Spears' ode to self-exploration". During the chorus Gaga sings, "Happy in the club with a bottle of red wine / Stars in our eyes 'cause we're having a good time / Hey-ey, Hey-ey / So happy I could die." Melinda Newman from the website HitFix compared the song's sound with Madonna while also noting similarities in the refrain containing the lines "hey-ey-hey-ey" to Rihanna. Tony Hardy from the website Consequence of Sound described "So Happy I Could Die" as a "chilled" song with lyrics open to interpretation. He felt that potential themes of the song may be Sapphic desires, the singer's alter ego and "transient" effects of wine and fame. A writer of Popjustice compared the song's "ravey" beats with work by DJ Tiësto.

== Critical response ==
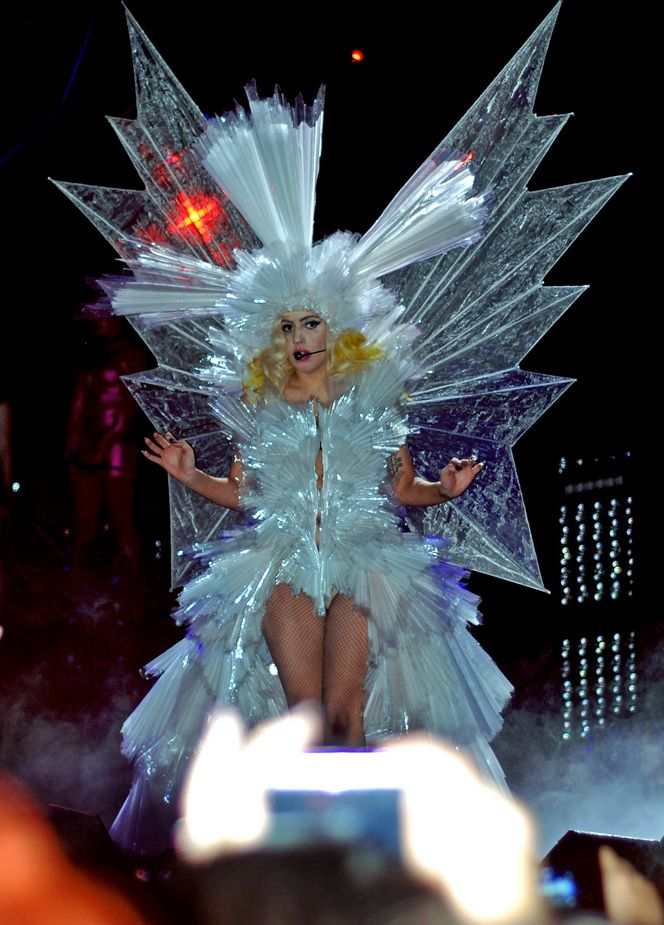
Gaga performing "So Happy I Could Die" on The Monster Ball Tour, while wearing the "Living Dress"

Describing it as a "pop fluff" song, Simon Price of The Independent wrote that "there's always a suggestion of something interesting going on behind those glitter-encrusted eyes". NME's Ben Patashnik applauded the song's suggestive nature; "'So Happy I Could Die' perfectly evokes the feeling of being alone in a crowded room with its icy beats, suggesting Gaga takes refuge in masturbation as the only way to retain control." "So Happy I Could Die" was declared as the twenty-seventh best Lady Gaga song by Rolling Stone, who concluded: "Gaga exults in the pleasures of club-hopping, drinking and bi-curiosity." Under the Radar columnist Nick Hyman avouched that "So Happy I Could Die" was an uninspiring track, while Evan Sawdey of PopMatters felt that Gaga's vocals were the worst out of any of her songs. "It's a bit of a disappointment, too, because for someone who is so painfully deliberate in crafting their unique visual image, it’s a let down to see that some of that quality control couldn’t be applied to the song selection that will ultimately define their legacy."

Bradley Stern of MuuMuse felt that the song was a continuation to Gaga's own "Starstruck" from The Fame, as they had the same "squeaky synthesizers and urban flavoring to engage in some self-indulgence". He went on to describe its music and lyrics as "dark" while also calling the song "[m]inimal and moody". Digital Spy's Nick Levine described the singer as "titillating" in the song while singing about "'touching herself' at the sight of a 'lavender blonde'". Melinda Newman from the website HitFix felt the song gave a chance to Gaga to explore her singing talents and concluded, "Hypnotic and a fun sing-along, this could be a single." Tony Hardy from Consequence of Sound noted that the song, which had a "promising" title was "not that bad". An editor of Popjustice felt that the song was not suitable for a single release but noted it was important to "the whole 'Fame Monster' thing". A more mixed review came from a writer of the website MusicOMH who felt that the pace of The Fame Monster "slowed slightly" with "So Happy I Could Die". He went on to describe its lyrics as "too contrived" and added that it "lacks the fizz of the earlier tracks". Similarly, Andrew Ryce from Beats Per Minute felt that the song was an "unconvincing anthem for hedonism, sounding more like a wistful lament than a party track".

== Chart performance ==
Upon release of the album, "So Happy I Could Die" garnered minor commercial success. It attained its highest position in Hungary, where it peaked at number ten on the Hungarian Singles Chart on the chart issue dated November 23, 2009. In Europe, it managed to debut in musical charts in Sweden and the United Kingdom, where it debuted at number fifty-three and eighty-four, respectively. In the US, the song charted at number 35 on the Billboard Dance/Electronic Digital Songs for the issue dated April 3, 2010.

== Live performances ==
"So Happy I Could Die" was part of the setlist of Gaga's second headlining concert tour, The Monster Ball (2009–2011). On the first version of the tour, Gaga performed the song alongside "Teeth", wearing a black leather corset. During the revamped Monster Ball shows, it was performed after playing some of her songs on the piano. She was then caught by a "tornado", which was portrayed by a cylinder shaped video screen lowered from the ceiling, covering the singer. Reappearing on stage, Gaga started performing the song while a hydraulic lift raised her high up in the air. She was seen wearing her "Living Dress", a white costume that moves on its own accord, complete with wings and a long train. The dress was mechanically and remotely controlled for its movements. It was inspired by the creations of designer Hussein Chalayan and was made by Vin Burnham. Gaga's references for the performance was both Dorothy as well as Glinda the Good Witch, from the 1939 film, The Wizard of Oz. According to Academic Richard J. Gray, Gaga merged both the characters in the performance, demonstrating the overall story arc of the tour, about self-sufficiency towards freedom and personal growth. He also listed is as the "most awe-inspiring and show stopping sight of the [tour]."

== Credits and personnel ==
Credits adapted from the liner notes of The Fame Monster.

- Lady Gaga – vocals, songwriter, producer, keyboards, background vocals, arrangement
- Nadir "RedOne" Khayat – songwriter, producer, programming, keyboards, arrangement, audio engineering
- Nicolas "Space Cowboy" Dresti – songwriter, producer, programming, keyboards
- Johny Severin – vocal editing, audio engineering
- Dave Russell – audio engineering
- Mike Orton – audio mixing

== Charts ==
Weekly chart performance for "So Happy I Could Die"
Chart (2009-2010)	Peak position
Hungary (Single Top 40)	10
Scottish Singles Sales (Official Charts)	72
Sweden (Sverigetopplistan)	53
UK Singles (Official Charts)	84
US Dance/Electronic Digital Songs (Billboard)	35
