= The Monster Ball Tour =

2009–11 concert tour by Lady Gaga

- World tour by Lady Gaga
- Promotional poster
- Location: Asia; Europe; North America; Oceania
- Associated album: The Fame Monster
- Start date: November 27, 2009
- End date: May 6, 2011
- Legs: 8
- No. of shows: 202
- Supporting acts: Kid Cudi; Semi Precious Weapons; Jason Derulo; Alphabeat; Far East Movement; Scissor Sisters
- Box office: $227.4 million ($325.46 in 2025 dollars)

Lady Gaga concert chronology
- Fame Kills: Starring Kanye West and Lady Gaga (2009–10; canceled); The Monster Ball Tour (2009–2011); Born This Way Ball (2012–2013)

The Monster Ball Tour was the second worldwide concert tour by American singer-songwriter Lady Gaga. Staged in support of her third EP, The Fame Monster (2009), the concert largely comprised songs from that recording as well as Gaga's debut album, The Fame (2008). The tour visited various arenas and stadiums, performing over 200 shows between November 2009 and May 2011. With the tour separated into three respective North American and European legs, as well as visiting Australia, New Zealand and Japan, the Monster Ball is the highest-grossing tour for a debut headlining artist in history.

Described as "the first-ever pop electro opera" by Gaga, the tour was announced in October 2009, after an originally planned joint concert tour with rapper Kanye West was abruptly cancelled; instead, the Monster Ball officially began just four days after the release of The Fame Monster, in November 2009. An updated version of the show was created after only a few months of touring due to the singer's concerns that the original had been rushed-through during its initial stages. The stage for the original show looked like a "frame", similar to a hollowed-out television set.

As The Fame Monster dealt with topics of overexposure and toxic celebrity culture, including the paranoia Gaga herself had experienced, the main theme of the shows became personal growth and human evolution, while elements of the originally planned tour (with Kanye West) were retained in some parts. From 2010 on, the shows took on a "Big Apple" theme, telling a story in which Gaga and her friends are lost in New York City and must find their way to the "Monster Ball". Both versions of the show were divided into five acts, with an encore finale. Each section featured Gaga and her dancers in new outfits, performing music relating to the theme of each respective act; acts were separated by video interludes.

The tour received positive reviews, with critics praising Gaga's live vocals, musicianship, and the theatrics of the show. The Monster Ball was also a commercial success, with high demand for tickets creating multiple-date extensions to the itinerary. The Monster Ball ultimately grossed an estimated US$227.4 million from 203 reported shows, attended by an audience of 2.5 million. At the 2010 Billboard Live Music Awards, Gaga won the Breakthrough Performer Award as well as the Concert Marketing & Promotion Award. HBO recorded a special of the Monster Ball during Gaga's February 2011 shows at Madison Square Garden in New York City; interspersed with backstage footage and interviews, Lady Gaga Presents the Monster Ball Tour: At Madison Square Garden aired on HBO in May 2011 and was released on DVD and Blu-ray on November 21 of that year.

== Background ==
Rapper Kanye West and Lady Gaga initially planned to launch a joint tour in October 2009, known as Fame Kills: Starring Kanye West and Lady Gaga. Amid negative response to his controversial outbursts at the 2009 MTV Video Music Awards, West declared that he would take a hiatus from his music career. Nevertheless, the complete schedule for Fame Kills was released, with the tour set to begin on November 10, 2009, in Phoenix, Arizona. Shortly afterwards, the tour was officially cancelled without any explanation. Gaga addressed the situation at Billboard's annual Women in Music luncheon, where she cited creative differences as the reason for the tour's cancellation. In an interview she stated, "[Kanye] is going to take a break, but the good news is, I am not."

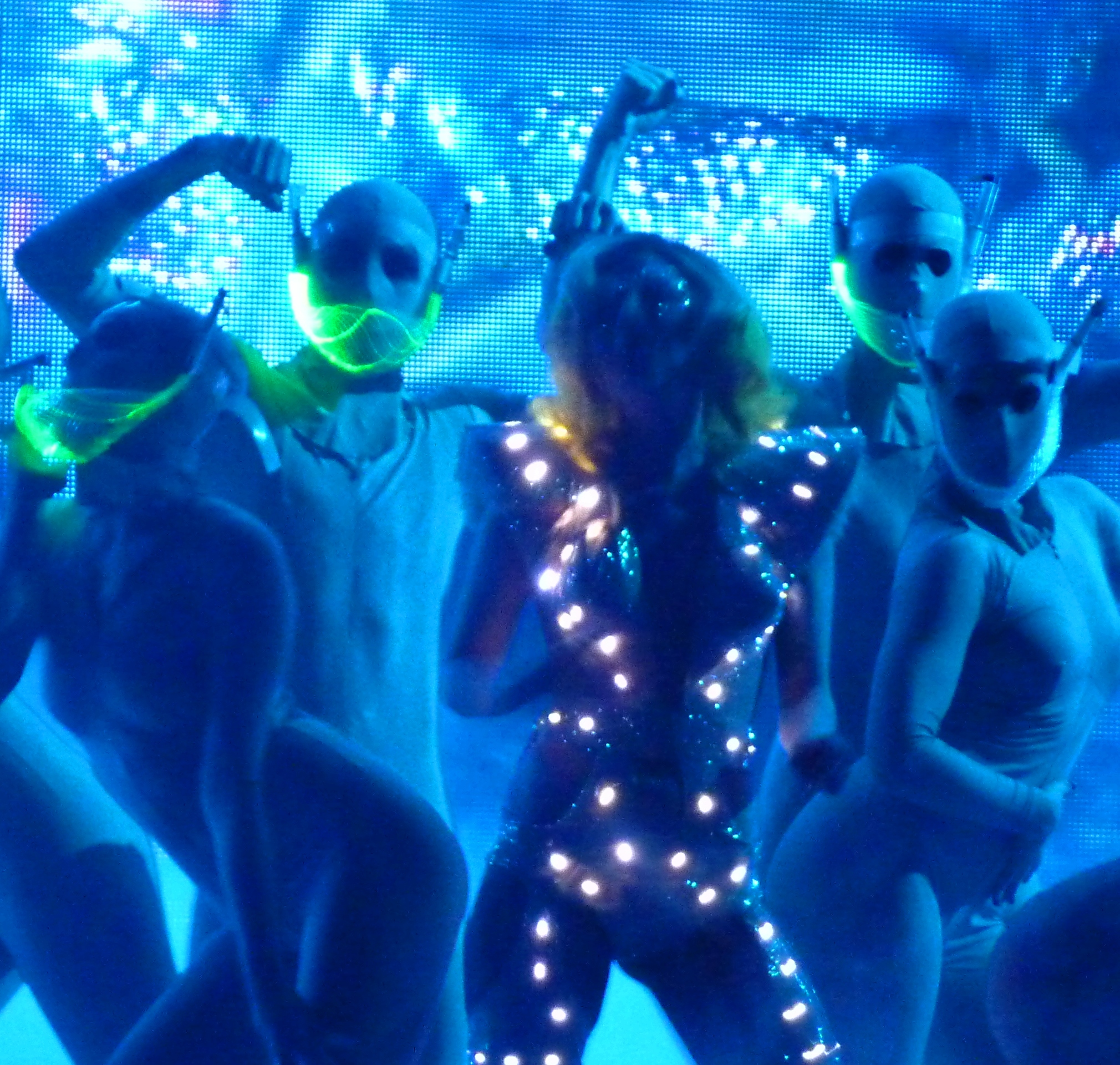
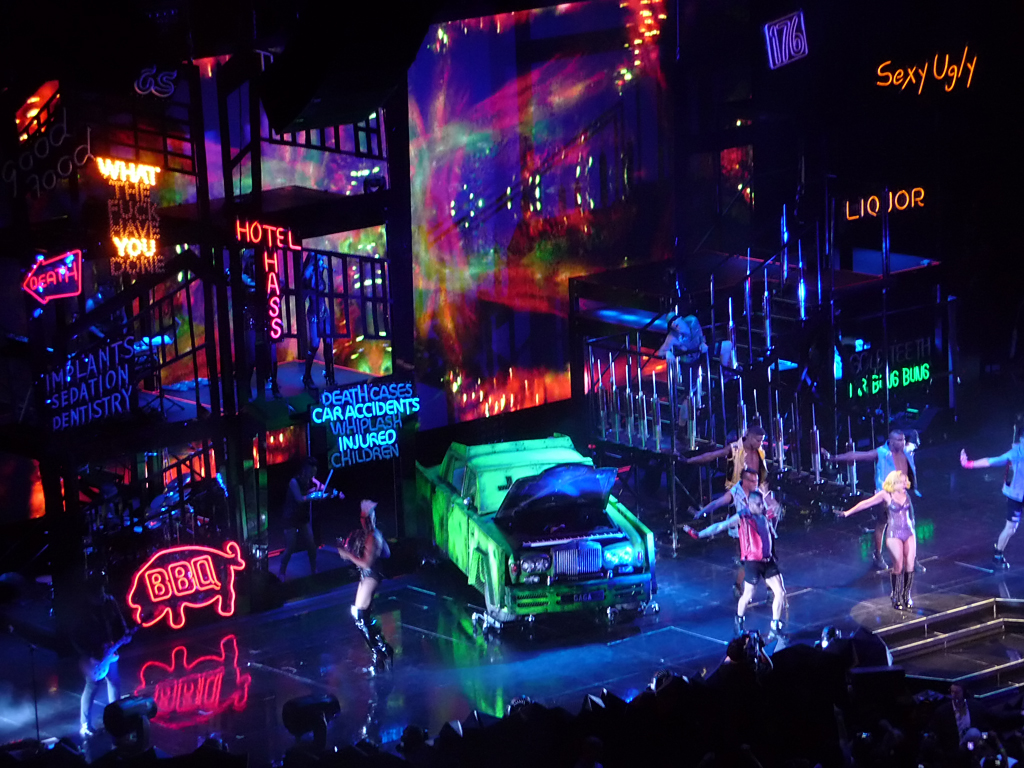
The original and the revised shows began with a club remix of "Dance in the Dark". In the original show (left), Gaga appeared behind scrim lighting, while the revised show (right) presented a New York City night scene.

After assuring the public that she would be embarking on her own tour, Gaga officially announced the Monster Ball Tour on October 15, 2009. It was originally planned to debut in London in early 2010, but ended up kicking off on November 27, 2009, in Montreal. Rapper Kid Cudi and singer Jason Derulo were confirmed as the supporting acts for the tour, with Cudi supporting Gaga from the beginning of the tour, and Derulo joining from December 28, 2009. The official poster for the tour featured Gaga in Versace 676 sunglasses and wearing a gyroscope around her called "The Orbit", which she first wore on the October 3, 2009, episode of Saturday Night Live. The contraption was designed by Nasir Mazhar in collaboration with Gaga's own creative production company, Haus of Gaga. The tour's sponsor of the American leg was Virgin Mobile USA, who introduced the "Free I.P." program which offered free show tickets to fans who volunteered their time to homeless youth organizations.

== Development ==
=== Original concept ===
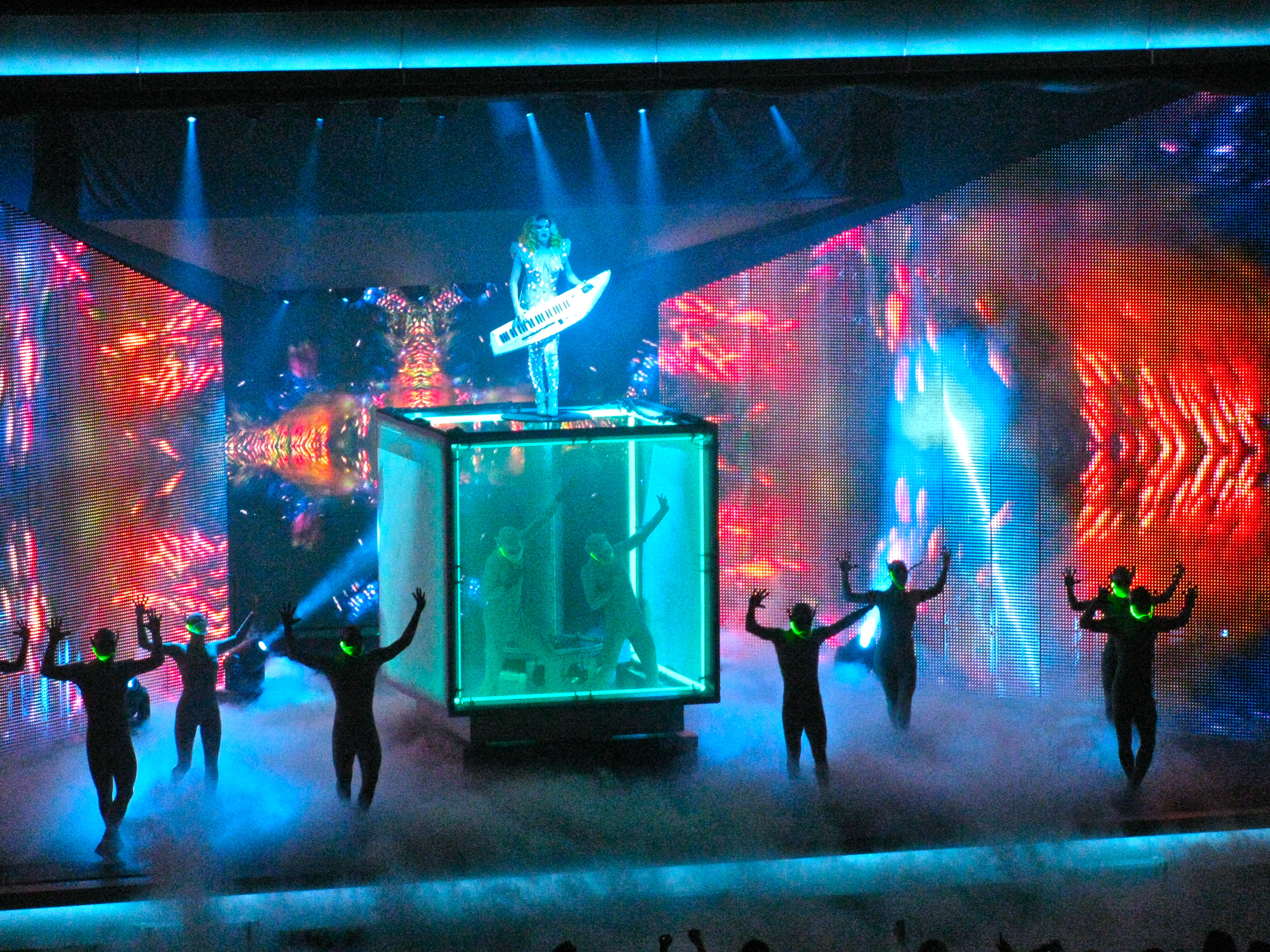
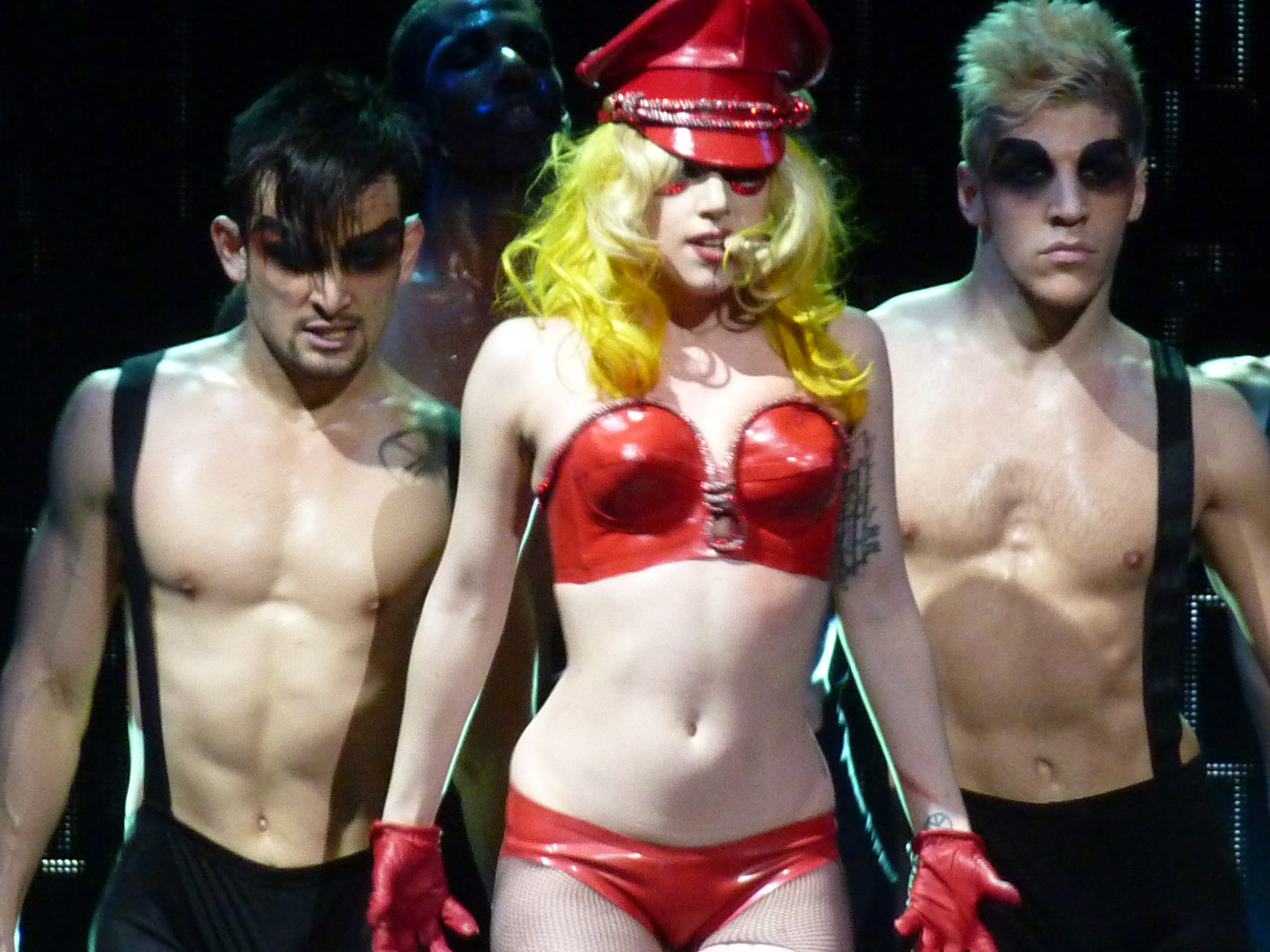
The performance of "Just Dance" on the original show (left) had Gaga coming out from a white cube, while "Boys Boys Boys" was performed in a red leather bikini (right).

In an interview with Rolling Stone, Gaga explained that she wanted to put together an expensive looking, beautiful show which would be affordable for her fans. She asserted that the tour was a "pop-electro opera" because the theatrics and story elements interwoven within it played out like an opera. According to her, the design of the show was innovative and forward in terms of creativeness. Gaga wanted to change the shape of the stage and designed one with Haus of Gaga that was "essentially a frame with forced perspective, and the frame is put inside the stage." The stage had a triangular inset, like a diamond, and everywhere the show took place, the dimensions were measured in such a way that the box fit any stage. "So no matter where I go, my fans get the same experience. So often you go into theaters and there's ambient light flying in from all sorts of places, and the audience is in different spots, and the stage is in different shapes and lengths and widths and depths, so this is a way for me to control all the light and all of the different elements of the show", she added.

The show revolved around themes of evolution, as well as her paranoias represented on The Fame Monster. While developing the tour Gaga spoke about original sin and demons inside human beings; "So we talked about growth, and that led us into this kind of scientific space, and we started talking about evolution and the evolution of humanity and how we begin as one thing, and we become another." This theme of monsters and evolution played a part in the fashion for the tour, which according to Gaga was "another level from where we were with the Fame Ball. [...] It's going to be a truly artistic experience that is going to take the form of the greatest post-apocalyptic house party that you've ever been to." Although Gaga stated that she was inspired by the things she and West were doing with the Fame Kills tour, she concluded that she did not want to use any of the things that they had designed together. Later, she said that Fame Kills was "the great lost tour", but confirmed that some of the elements of it were incorporated into the Monster Ball.

In an interview with MTV News, Gaga further described the tour:

"I begin as a cell and I grow and change throughout the show. And it's also done in what now is becoming my aesthetic, which is, you know, it's part pop, part performance art, part fashion installation—so all of those things are present... It's a story, it's me battling all my monsters along the way. I'm playing all the music from The Fame, all the music from The Fame Monster. And the stage that I designed with the Haus [of Gaga] is a giant cube that sits. Imagine you were to hollow out a TV and just break the fourth wall on a TV screen. It forces you to look at the center of the TV. It's my way of saying, 'My music is art.'"

For the performance of "Paparazzi", Gaga had collaborated with her Haus of Gaga creative partner Matthew "Matty Dada" Williams. She had a different vision for it in the beginning. Dada thought that Gaga should wear her hair braided, which Gaga had never done before. Dada's explanation for the concept was the look of Rapunzel, the fairy-tale character. He felt that "it's something people deeply understand. And when you're wearing sunglasses on a scaffolding piece with a giant alien dancing behind you, I promised [to Gaga] it's not going to look like Rapunzel.'"

=== Revamped concept ===
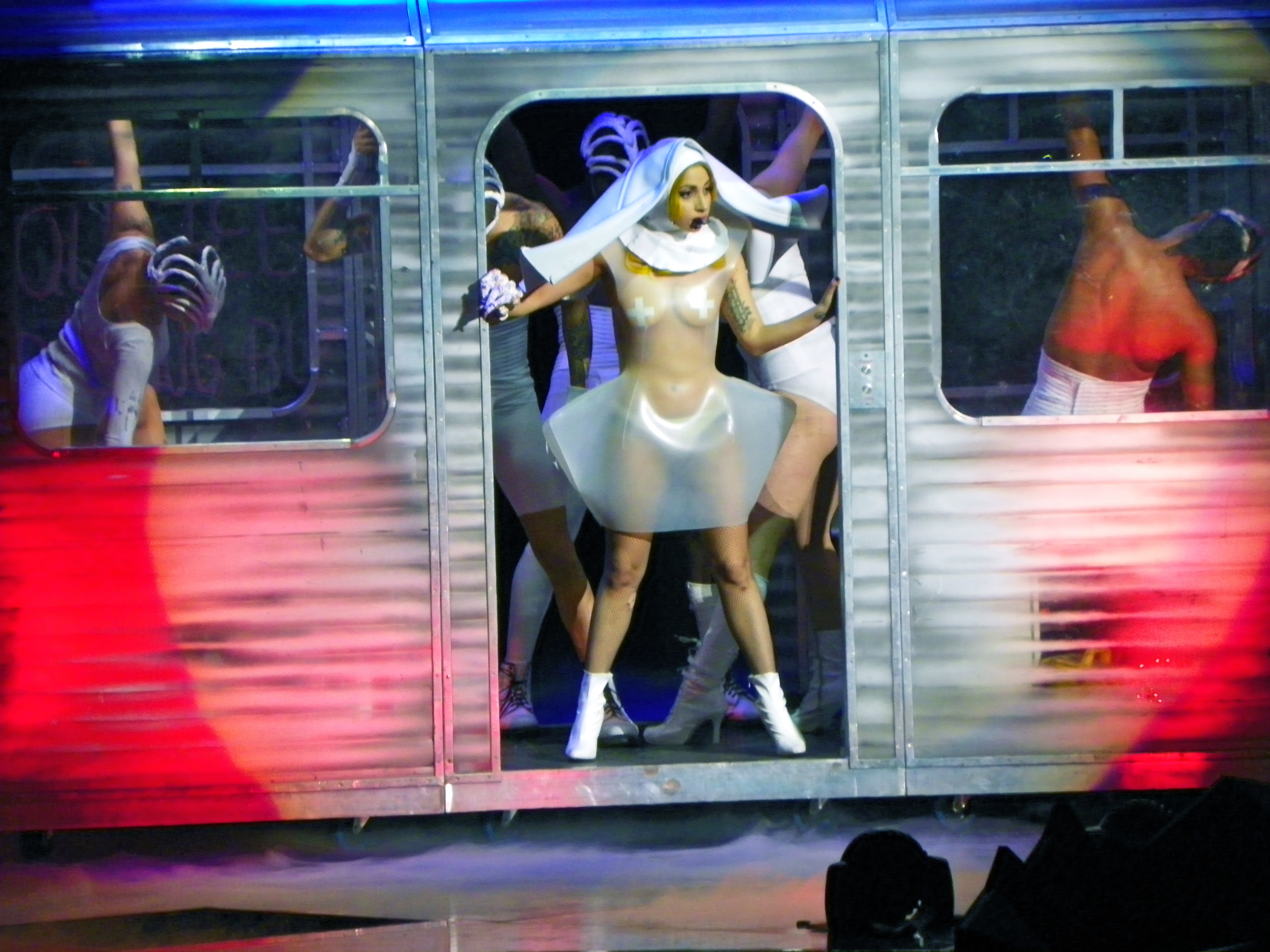
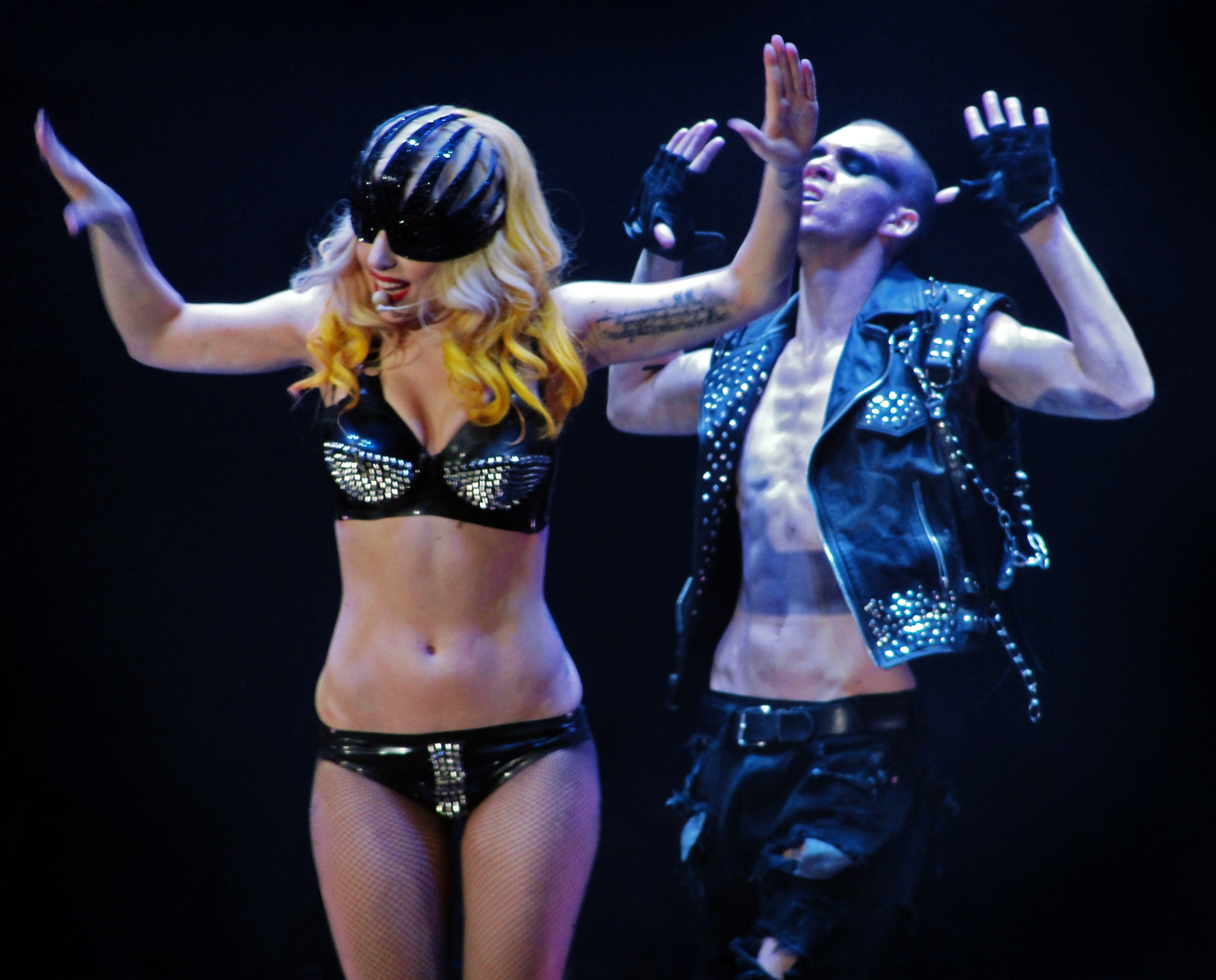
On the revamped show, "LoveGame" was performed (left) decked in a nun's habit, and dancing inside a subway coach. During "Telephone", Gaga danced to the choreography seen in the song's video (right).

In December 2009, Gaga revealed that she planned to cancel the concept of the original shows of the Monster Ball Tour and start afresh. She felt that the revamp of the show was needed as the original tour was constructed in a very short span of time. Gaga recalled that after West and she split up for this tour, she was unsure if she could get a show together in time, but nevertheless wanted to promote The Fame Monster. Hence she was able to put together "something that, in truth, I never would have done if I had a longer amount of time". The revamp of the tour was planned from the arena shows in the United Kingdom from February 2010. "My team thinks I'm completely psychotic. But I don't fucking care what they think. [...] Well, just to give you an idea, the stage is about four times the size of the one we're on now and conceptually, it's completely different. One thing that has been lost over the past 10-15 years, in pop music, is the idea of showbiz. And this is definitely going to bring that back", clarified Gaga. According to James Montgomery of MTV, the show recalled the Broadway performance musicals The Wizard of Oz (1939) and West Side Story (1961), the Broadway stage musical Metropolis (1989), and the television mini-series Angels in America (2003).

During an interview with London's 95.8 Capital FM radio station, Gaga further elaborated on the changes in the show. She said that the show was constructed like a piece of musical theater. It also incorporated a number of contemporary and old musical pieces, some of them being re-recorded specifically for the show itself. A new keytar was constructed for the show and was named Emma. The instrument was created by the Haus of Gaga and the singer said, "We have this new instrument that I brought to the Brits tonight, 'Emma', which is what I was playing on the stage. She's a hybrid from all these other instruments." During an interview on KISS-FM with Ryan Seacrest, on his show On Air with Ryan Seacrest, Gaga explained that the concert tour was still called "The Monster Ball", but it had become more of a musical and less of a concert. It had a New York theme at its core; telling a story where Gaga and her friends travel to the Monster Ball, but get lost.

== Concert synopsis ==
=== Pre-revisions ===
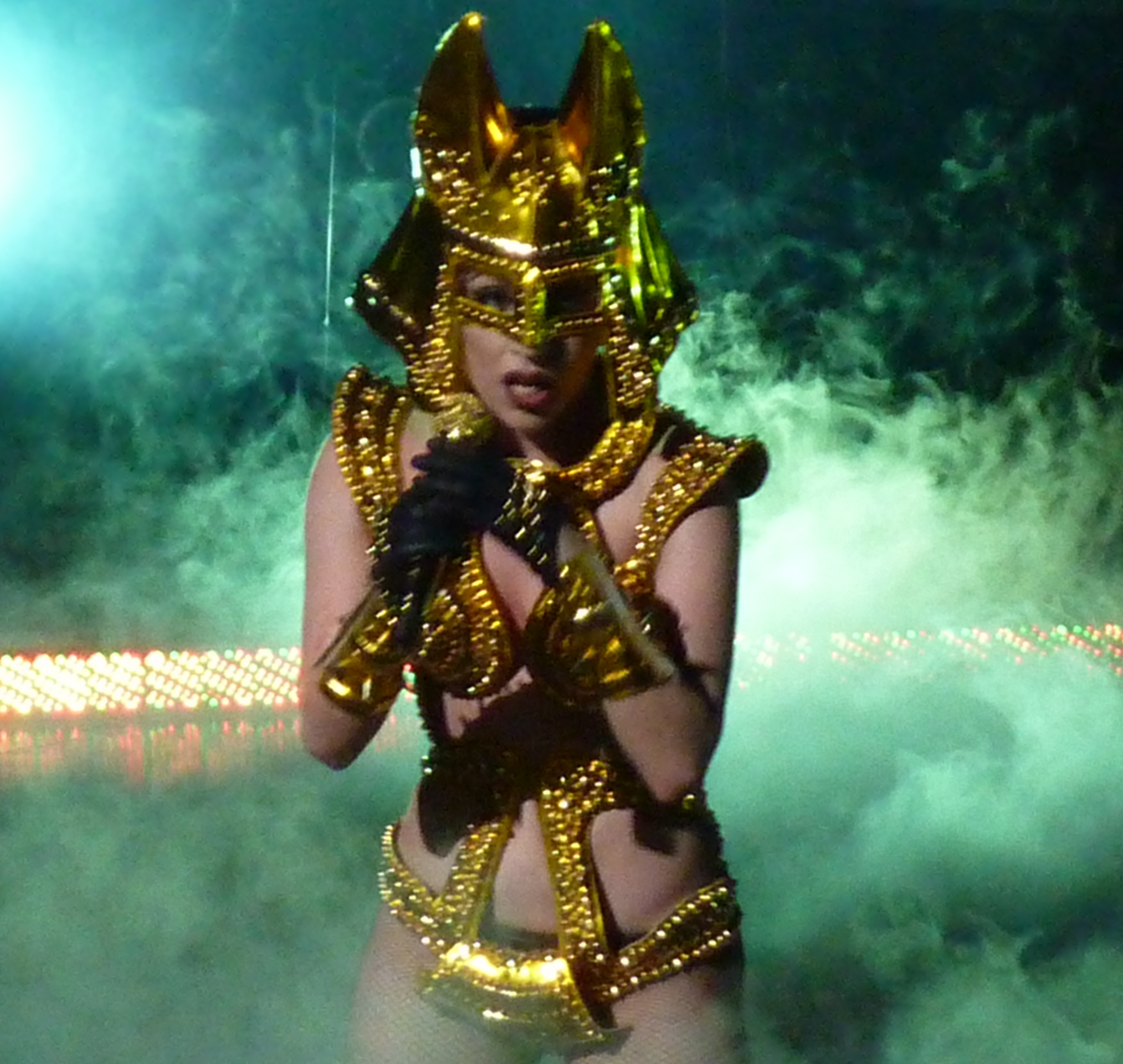
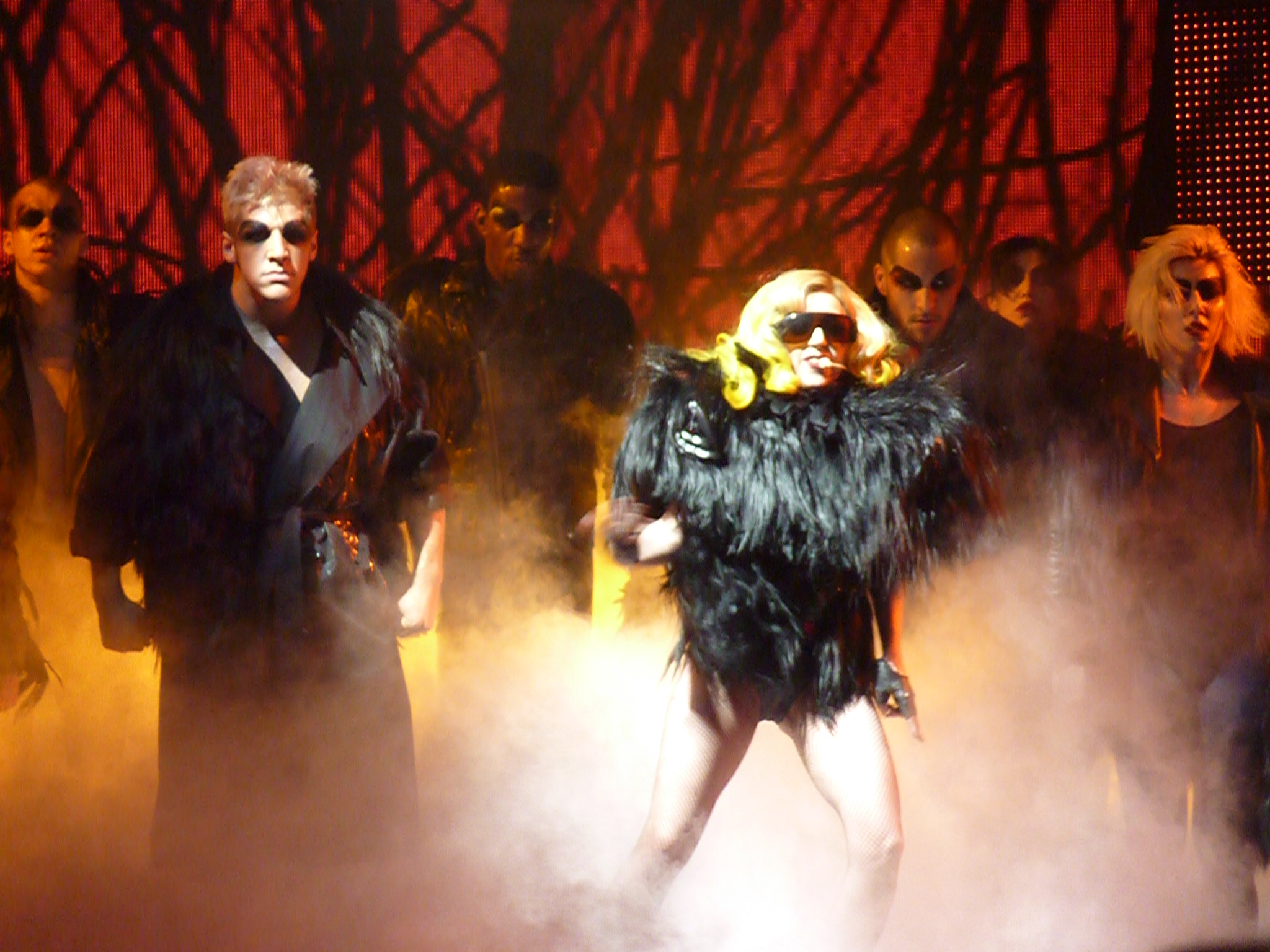
In the original show, "Fashion" was performed in a gold, Egyptian-style outfit (left), while during the performance of "Monster" Gaga wore a black feathered jacket (right).

Beginning behind a giant, green, laser lit video screen featuring scrim lights, Gaga appeared in a bulb-covered futuristic silver jeweled jumpsuit with matching eye makeup and mask and sang "Dance in the Dark" as dancers, dressed in white balaclavas and white jumpsuits, moved around her. The video screen, resembling an electric mathematical grid, was eventually lifted during the performance. After the song, Gaga strapped a portable silver jeweled keyboard to herself and began to perform "Just Dance" while emerging from the inside of a white cube on a platform. This was followed by a brief video intermission and Gaga returned onstage in an off-white costume, that resembled an alien ecto-skeleton, while the dancers wore skeletal headgear. She started performing "LoveGame", which ended with Gaga pointing towards her groin. Flames appeared on the video screens, as she got out of her ecto-skeleton outfit. After stripping down to a silver bodysuit she performed "Alejandro", and was carried by her crotch by one of her male dancers, and later lowered onto another one of them.

The section was followed by a video interlude featuring snarling dogs and brooding ravens. The performance of "Monster" began with Gaga emerging in a black feathered jacket and performing dance moves reminiscent of Michael Jackson as the backdrops featured a black bird's wings. She continued with two songs from The Fame Monster titled "So Happy I Could Die" and "Teeth", after which she removed the feathered dress. Gaga then started performing the song "Speechless" on piano, and continued with an acoustic version of "Poker Face". Rapper Kid Cudi joined her then to perform his song "Make Her Say" which contains a sample of "Poker Face". This segment was followed by the performance of "Fashion" and "The Fame", during which Gaga wore a gold Egyptian styled crown and matching body suit, compared to the garment of a viking. Gaga crawled atop her piano during the follow-up songs "The Fame" and "Money Honey", after which she returned to the stage, dressed in black vinyl and nearly nude in a red patent leather bikini, to perform "Boys Boys Boys", backed by a squadron of skinny and shirtless leather boys. During "Poker Face", she wore a bondage inspired black leather dress with guns hanging from it and a hat made of muzzles, and pumped her hands in the air while performing the song. This was followed by Gaga sitting on a dentist's chair and spreading her legs during "Paper Gangsta". Another video interlude followed, displaying arty poses of Gaga in gothic looks.

She returned to the stage while wearing multiple donned braided extensions for "Paparazzi". Gaga was perched atop a railing and from each of her braids, a dancer was attached on the stage. A backdrop of stars were shown during the performance. The performance ended with the railing taking Gaga high above the stage, where she faked her death. This was followed by "Eh, Eh (Nothing Else I Can Say)" as she descended from the top—which signified her rebirth—amidst white lights and mechanical fog. She wore a giant gyroscope around her, akin to "The Orbit" by Haus of Gaga. The last song of the show was "Bad Romance" which she performed in an '80s-inspired white power suit with exaggerated high shoulders and high-waisted pants. The show ended with a video of Gaga getting a heart-shaped tattoo on her shoulder, with the word "Dad" in the center of it.

=== Post-revisions ===
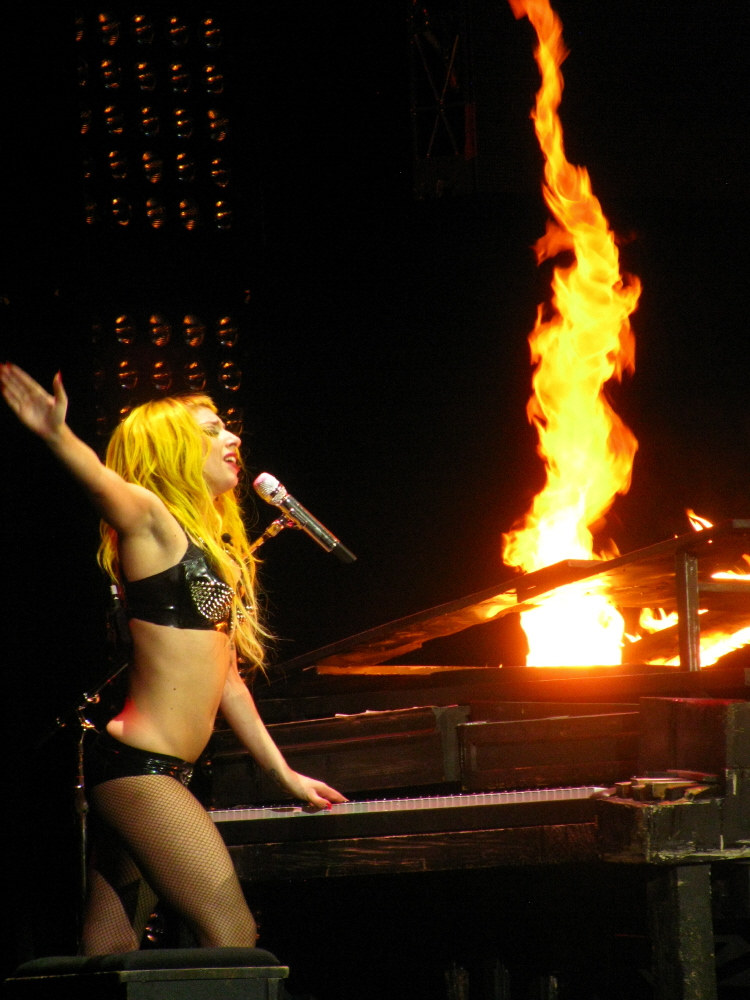
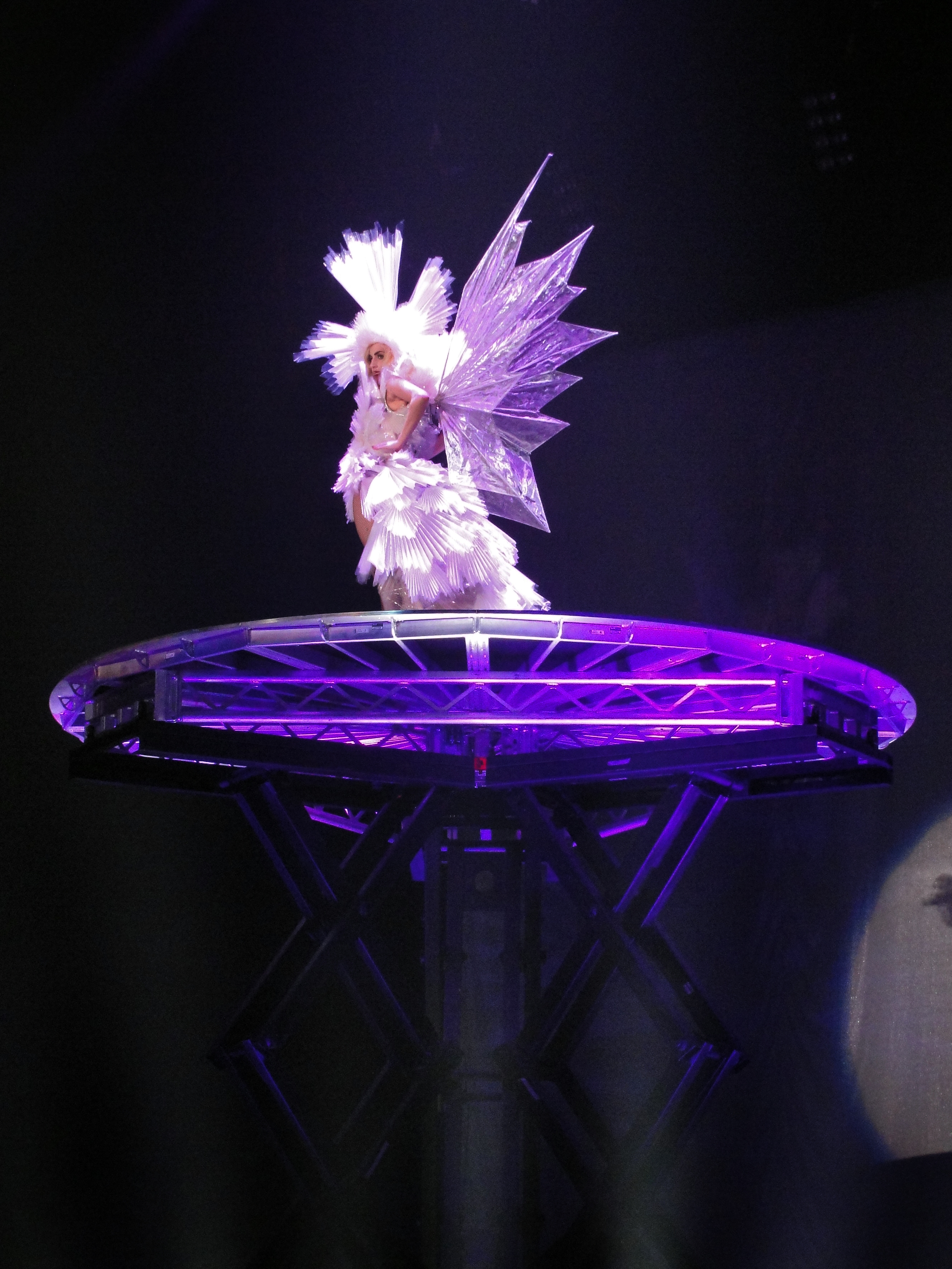
During the performance of "Speechless", Gaga's piano spouts flames (left), while during "So Happy I Could Die" she wore a white dress that could move on its own accord.

After revisions, the show was divided into four sections: City, Subway, Forest, Monster Ball and concluded with an encore. It began with a projected video onto a curtain—which contained images of Gaga doing a 360 degree jump—while a club remix of "Dance in the Dark" played. Surrounded by violet light, her silhouette appeared on the curtain while she performed "Dance in the Dark". Once the curtain was removed and the chorus reached, the New York cityscape and neon lights were revealed. Gaga gyrated on the set dressed in a "futuristic, angular, glitter ball suit". After descending from her fire escape, she poked around in the hood of a dilapidated green Rolls-Royce while performing "Glitter and Grease". Upon checking under the vehicle's bonnet, Gaga revealed a keyboard and began to play the opening notes of "Just Dance". Gaga then performed "Beautiful, Dirty, Rich" while scaling various pieces of scaffolding and subsequently "The Fame" where she rose from beneath the stage and played her keytar Emma, wearing a giant red cape.

"LoveGame" saw the beginning of the Subway section, with Gaga wearing a translucent nun's habit, and a skeletal hand. The song was performed with the aid of a gilded subway car and a "disco stick" while her next number "Boys Boys Boys" featured muscly male dancers cavorting in spandex shorts. After a costume change, Gaga burst into "Money Honey" with an extended keytar solo after emerging from beneath the stage as the New York scenery disappeared around her. As she walked towards the Glitter way, Gaga recalls when she was in jail and her friend Beyoncé bailed her out, thus performing the song "Telephone". A piano is then brought in and Gaga goes into the song "Brown Eyes", after which she performs "Speechless" while the piano starts spitting fire. This segment also saw the performance of "You and I" in some of the shows; the song was eventually included on Gaga's second studio album, Born This Way. During this song, she tells the audience about her life as a teen in New York, and how she became who she is today. Gaga and her friends then continue down the Glitter Way, and soon they run into an angel, who plays an angelic tune that summons a twister, taking them closer to the Monster Ball, but landing them in a strange place that they did not know. Gaga sings "So Happy I Could Die", decked in a white dress, that moves on its own accord.

The third segment begins with Gaga returning on the stage and singing "Monster", inside a forest with black, thornlike trees. Her dancers conglomerate around her near the end and Gaga reveals herself to be covered with blood. She then states that the thing she hates more than money is the truth and performs "Teeth", while introducing her band. Gaga and her friends then find the Eternal Fountain, which pours out red colored liquid and Gaga explains that it bleeds for anyone. She starts singing "Alejandro" while jumping into the fountain and singing, as blood pours over her. Gaga then returns and sings "Poker Face" on the cat-walk. After the performance, she and her friends find themselves in a dark place, and after some dialogue, Gaga's friends run off, leaving her alone to deal with the Fame Monster, a giant angler fish. Gaga starts singing "Paparazzi" and eventually kills the Fame Monster by shooting sparks from her pyrotechnic bra and underwear. She then leaves for the Monster Ball and after appearing there, meanwhile fans assume the show is not over yet, suddenly Gaga appears on stage and performs the song, "Bad Romance" while standing inside a giant gyroscope. After the song, she says that she can do one more song for an encore to the audience. "Born This Way" is performed with Gaga singing with a hand microphone and wearing a plastic two-piece ensemble and during the bridge, she performs an organ solo of Johann Sebastian Bach's Toccata and Fugue in D minor. After the end of the song, she creates a monster paw with her dancers and finally the show is over as the curtain goes down.

== Critical response ==
=== Original show ===
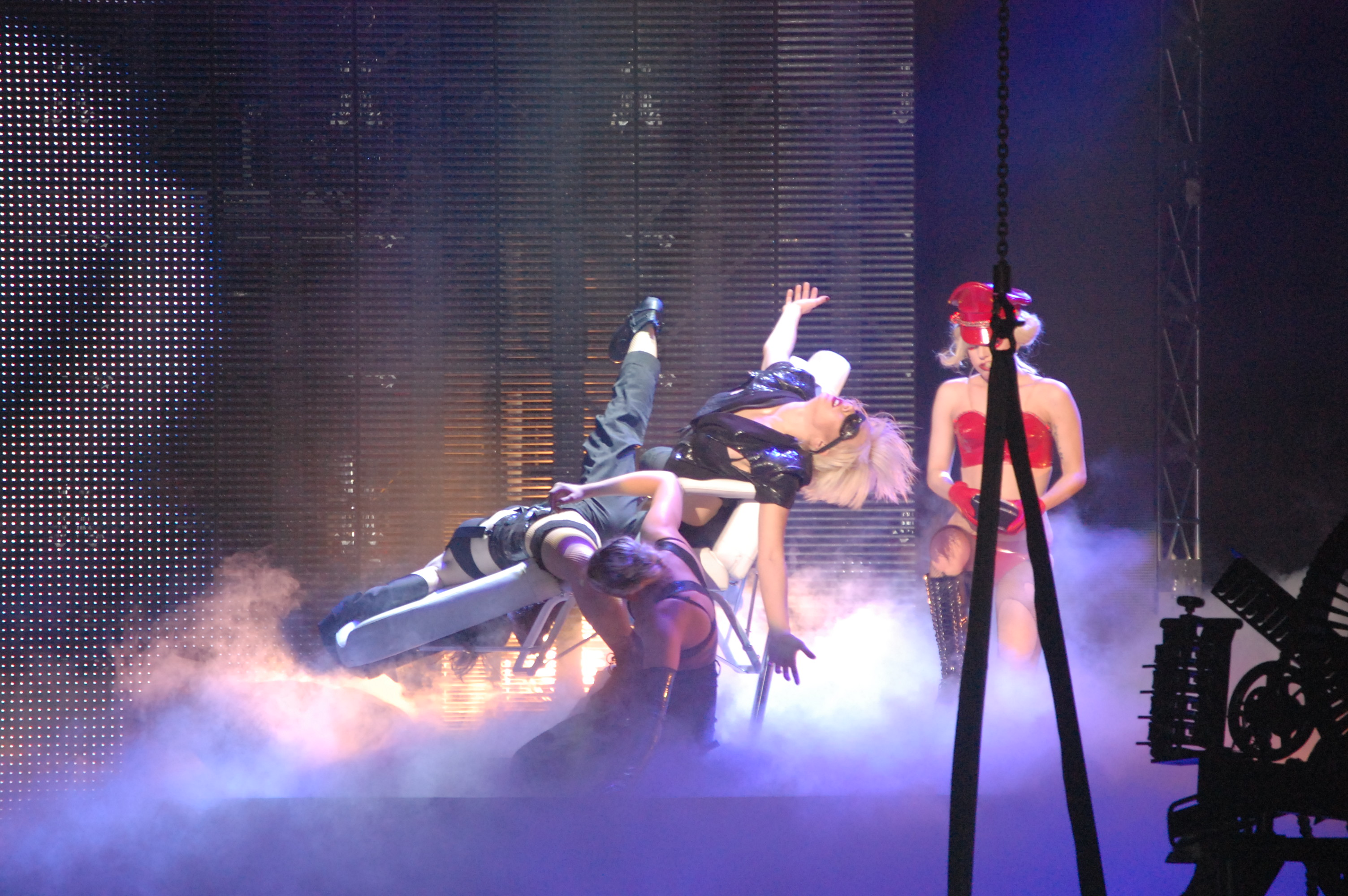
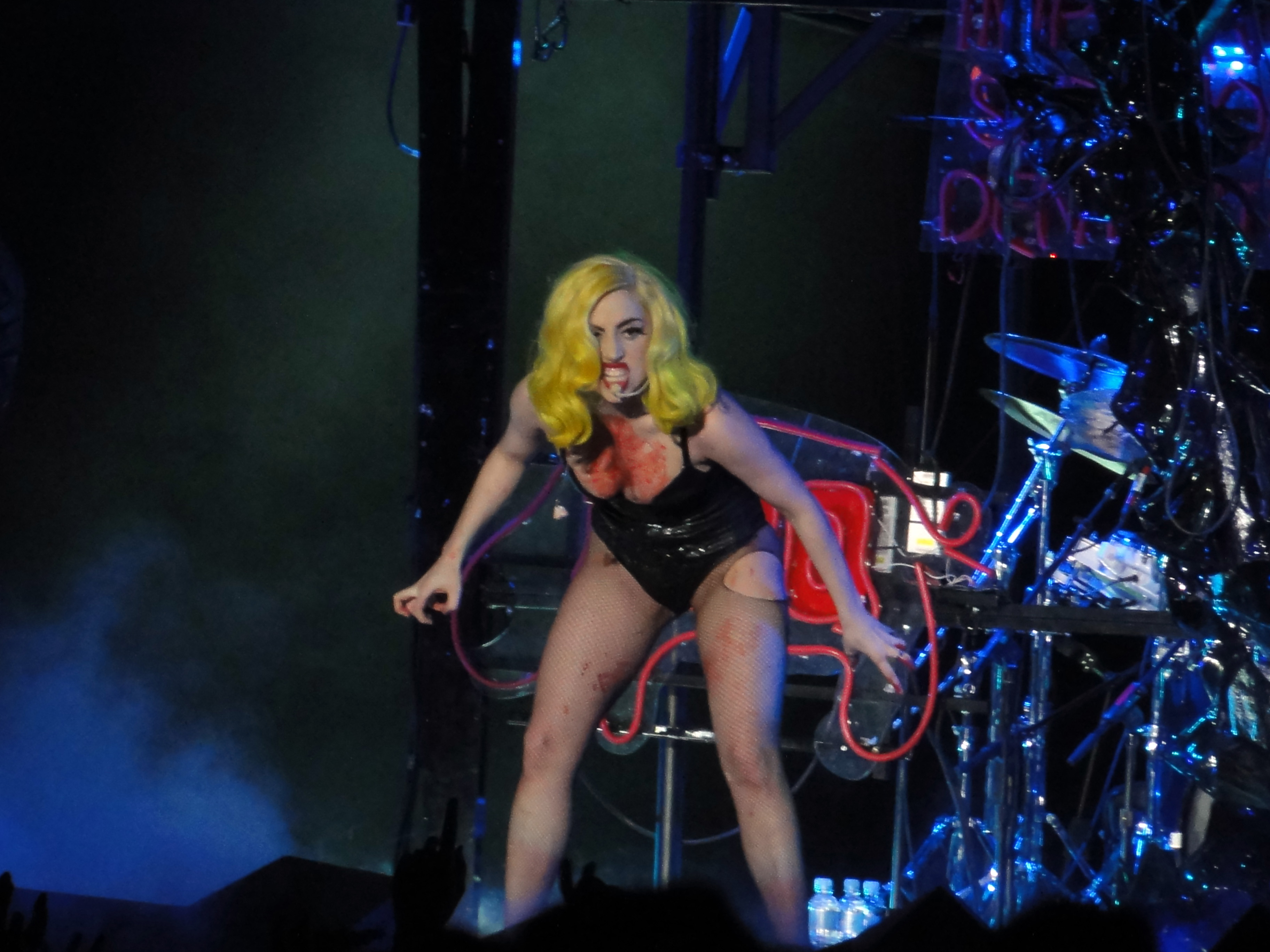
During the performance of "Paper Gangsta" on the original show, Gaga strapped her dancers to a dentist's chair (left). On the revamped show, Gaga was covered in fake blood for the performance of "Teeth" (right).

The original version of the tour received generally positive reviews from critics. Jane Stevenson from Toronto Sun gave the concert four out of five stars and said that Lady Gaga came across as a "confident, colourful, and campy performer. [...] Gaga's success was evident with slick-looking videos, lights, elaborate costumes, dancers, and yes, a band, even if her stage was sometimes left dark as she left to make numerous changes." T'Cha Dunlevy for The Gazette noted that the performance was lacking—adding that the show never reached its peak until the end, when Gaga performed the "real rendition" of "Poker Face" and "Bad Romance". "Better late than never", Dunlevy concluded. Aedan Helmer from Jam! magazine said that "At first blush, it might seem the real driving force behind Gaga's meteoric rise to fame is her hand-picked cadre of costume and set designers—dubbed Haus of Gaga—who seemingly know no bounds when it comes to pushing the envelope of haute couture and the theatre of the absurd. [...] But what really sets Gaga apart from the middling masses of lip-synching Britney clones and Idol wannabes is her pure, unadulterated musical talent. [...] The Lady can sing." Theatre critic Kelly Nestruck, while writing for The Guardian, said "While the Monster Ball has nothing on the great operas or the golden age of musical theatre, Lady Gaga's 'electro-pop opera' is at least twice as entertaining and infinitely fresher than any stage musical written over the last decade." Lauren Carter from Boston Herald praised the show saying "[Gaga] only has two albums under her belt but who cares? Every song feels like a hit, and Gaga-as-star is already taking on Madonna-like proportions. [...] After [the show] at the Wang Theater, fans could justifiably walk away thinking Lady Gaga is crazy, brilliant or both." Jeremy Adams from Rolling Stone reviewed the performance at Wang Center in Boston and said that "Throughout the evening, Gaga [..] aimed for a kind of pop theatricality that might potentially cement her burgeoning status as performance artist."

Aidin Vaziri of San Francisco Chronicle said that "During her 90-minute performance—not so much a live concert as a meticulously choreographed spectacle—Lady Gaga also evoked Kanye West with the futuristic set, Britney Spears in her heavy-lidded stage movements, Courtney Love with her interminable between-song monologues highlighted by four-letter squelches and—who else?—Madonna for, oh, just about everything else." Jim Harrington from San Jose Mercury News felt that the show would have been better technically if around thirty minutes were lessened from it. James Montogomery from MTV reviewed the concert at San Diego and said that "[Gaga] powered through and turned the San Diego Sports Arena into a raucous, delightfully raw discotheque." Writing for the Las Vegas Sun, Joe Brown observed that "Lady Gaga out-Cher-ed Cher, made Cirque du Soleil and Britney's 'Circus Tour' look like county fair carnivals, and made New Year's Eve in Las Vegas anticlimactic." Los Angeles Times writer Ann Powers avouched that the tour was "an invigoratingly ambitious show, executed with vigor by its star and her expressive dancers." Jon Pareles from The New York Times said that the tour always provided "something worth a snapshot: a sci-fi tableau, perhaps, or a skimpy, glittery costume. The more her image gets around, the better Lady Gaga does."

=== Revamped show ===
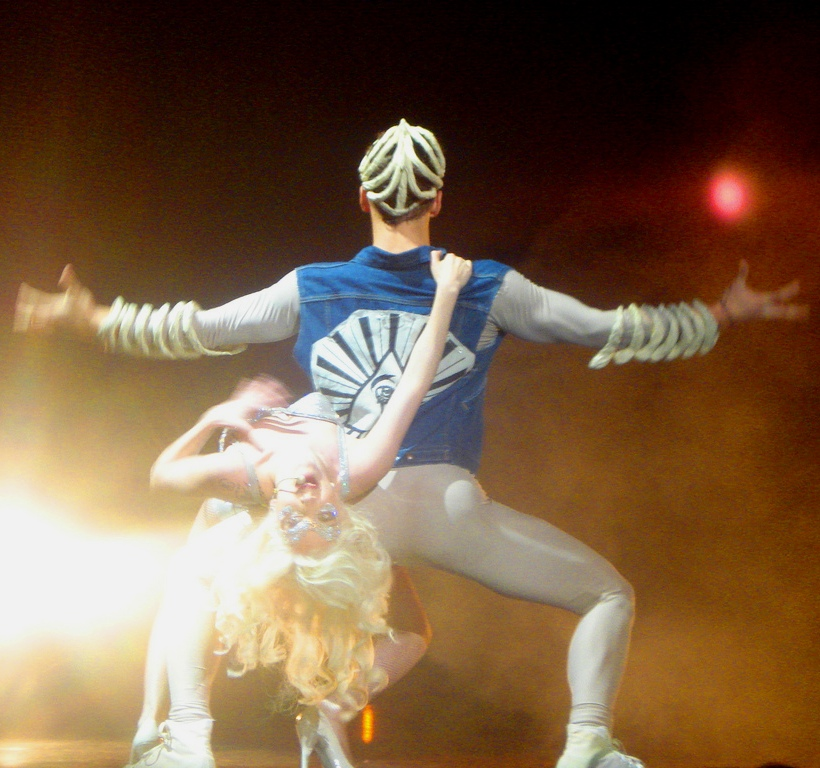
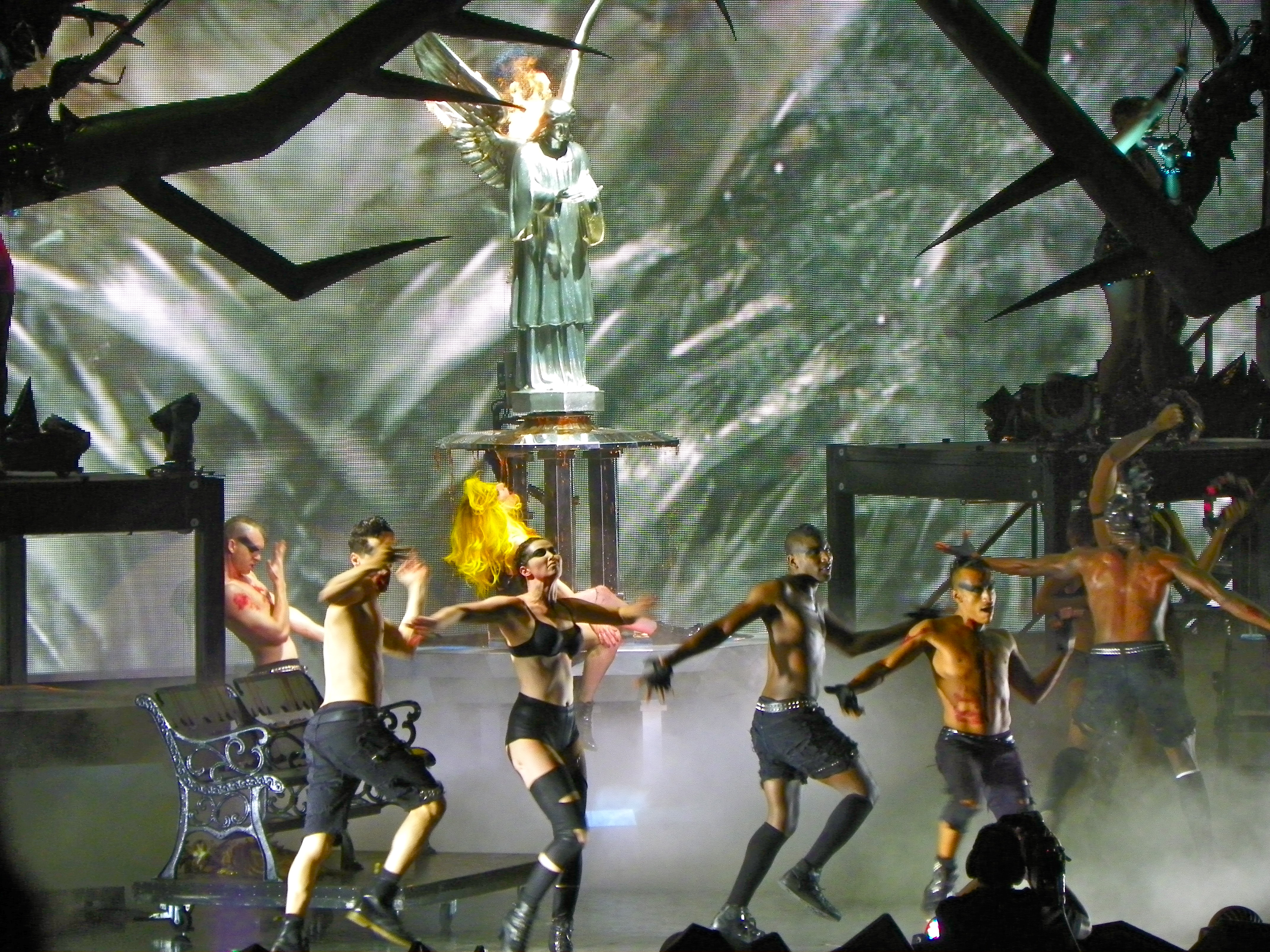
The performance of "Alejandro" on the original show portrayed sexual innuendo between Gaga and her dancer (left), while on the revamped show, she took a bath in a fountain, reminiscent of the one at Bethesda Terrace (right).

The revamped concerts were also met with critical acclaim. Mark Savage from BBC Online reviewed the first of the revised performances in the United Kingdom. Savage described the concert as a hugely ambitious, terrifyingly loud show, "spread over four acts and held together by a flimsy 'narrative' about Gaga and her dancer friends trying to get to a party." He was also impressed that the entire spectacle was put together in just four weeks. MTV's James Montogomery reviewed the first North American performance of the tour in Montreal, Quebec, Canada. He said that the tour was "packed with more wattage than an overheated power plant and more costume changes than a thousand Vegas reviews, it's the kind of show that leaves you with wide eyes, ringing ears, aching limbs and absolutely zero chance of making it to work in the morning." New York Daily News writer Jim Farber expected that the theatricality of the show might have obscured the songs, but instead felt that Gaga's voice was perfect and the concert actually "pushed Gaga a long way towards her obvious goal – to be the queen of this pop moment." Glenn Gamboa from Newsday said that Gaga "built her monster-sized fame on knowing how to create a spectacle and then having the substance to back it up. For every coat made of Kermit the Frog dolls or headdresses that covered her face in red lace, there was a stomping disco anthem or tender piano ballad to match. That back and forth is the centerpiece of her Monster Ball Tour." Dan Aquilante from the New York Post was critical of the show, calling it "scripted, silly, and tired, right down to Gaga's patter." He added that the 15 costumes Gaga wore during the two-hour plus gig were "more successful helping her cement the notion of an erotic and exotic otherworld." Writing in the Telegram & Gazette, Craig S. Semon was appreciative of the show, calling it "an out-of-this-world blast and end-of-the-world blow-out that must be seen to be believed."

Rick Massimo, reviewing the concert for The Providence Journal, wrote that as a musical theater, the Monster Ball was not that exciting, but "that leaves the music, and when you lay two hours of her songs end-to-end, it's easy to see the vision, the intelligence and a serious songwriting talent at work." Jay N. Miller from The Enterprise was impressed with the show, saying that the music was somewhere between industrial disco and house music with a rock edge, but "always danceable". Philip Borof from Bloomberg Television reviewed the concert in New York's Madison Square Garden and found it average, calling the crowd decked in various costumes as the "most entertaining". Toronto Star's Ben Rayner appreciated the show, exclaiming "hot damn, that was one hell of a show Gaga brought to the Air Canada Centre Sunday night and suddenly it doesn't seem redundant to add one more voice to the Lady Gaga choir." Mariel Concepción from Billboard felt that Gaga "may be best known for her gaudy outfits and over-the-top stage shows, but at her hometown headlining debut at Madison Square Garden last night, the pop phenomenon proved she's a regular girl at heart." The Seattle Times staff writer Marian Liu declared that as "one of the most anticipated touring acts of the year, [Gaga] stimulated the crowd's senses on Saturday night in a way few artists can. She brought spectacle and backed it up with soul." The Guardian journalist Alexis Petridis reviewed the opening show of the European leg, and commented that "it takes a certain je ne sais quoi to open your show doing something that looks suspiciously like mime on a rickety metal staircase while wearing an outfit with shoulderpads the size of the deck on a small aircraft carrier."

== Commercial reception ==
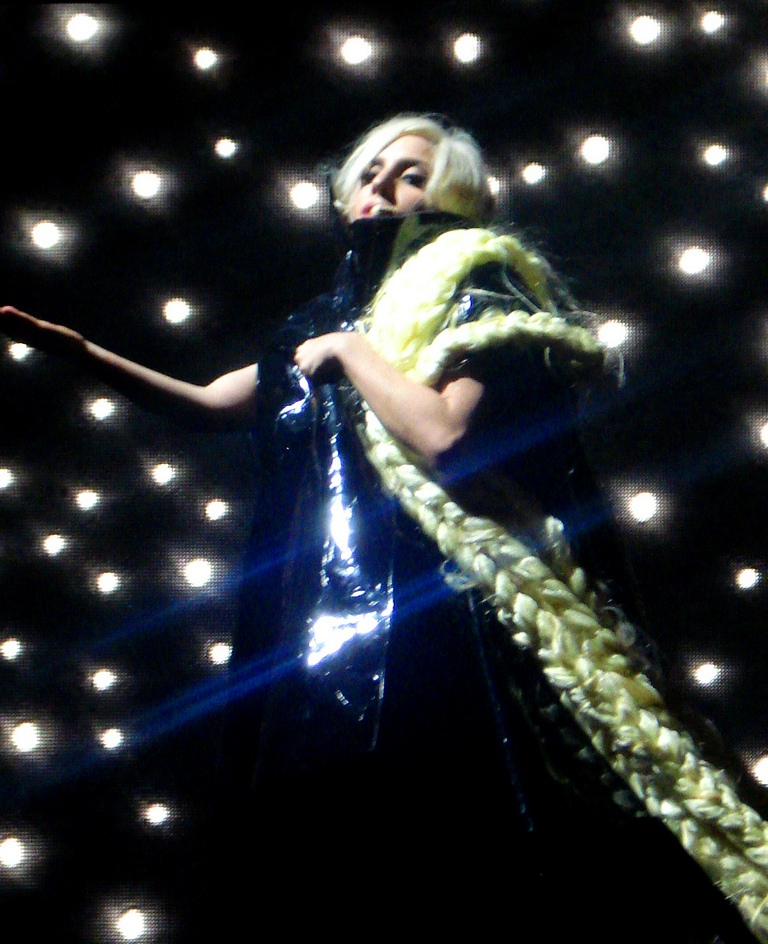
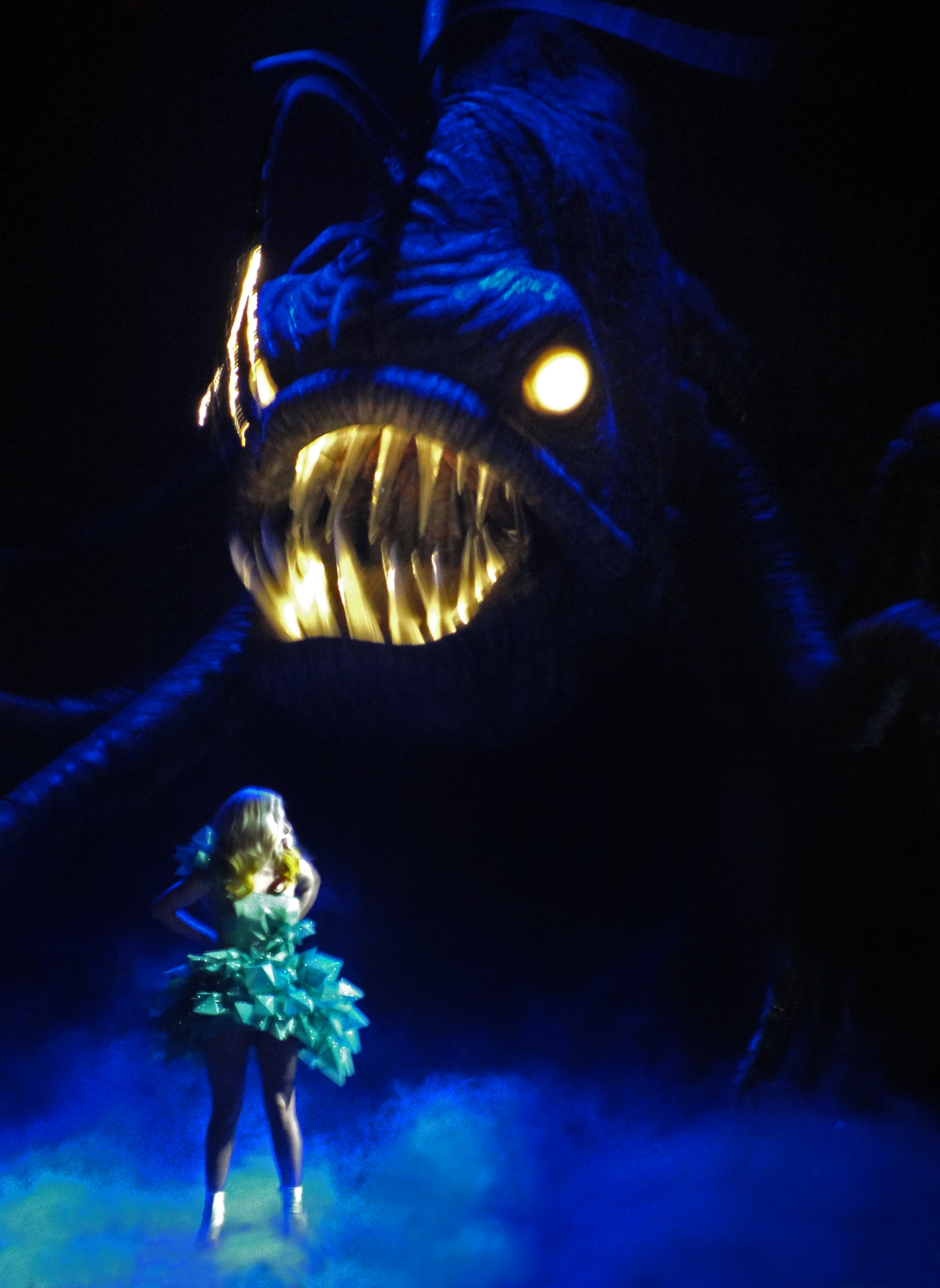
For "Paparazzi", Gaga developed a Rapunzel-inspired performance on the original show (left), while the revamped show featured a giant Anglerfish as the Fame Monster, with Gaga trying to kill it (right).

As soon as the dates for the show were announced, there was high demand for tickets. As sponsor of the North American Monster Ball Tour, Virgin Mobile customers had access to presale tickets. Bob Stohrer, VP of Marketing for Virgin Mobile USA said "We are excited to take our partnership with Lady Gaga and the Monster Ball Tour to another level. [...] We'll also build on our partnership around combating youth homelessness and continue to enhance the tour experience for fans and our customers." Shows in the first leg of the tour were sold-out completely, prompting Live Nation Inc. to announce that Gaga will return to the U.S. in February 2011 for another run of U.S. dates. The 2011 dates for the North American Monster Ball Tour were announced as starting from February 19 in Atlantic City, with ten arena dates confirmed through April 18. Additional shows were announced, and Semi Precious Weapons collaborated with Gaga until the tour ended. Live Nation Entertainment's global touring division, headed by chairman Arthur Fogel, held the reins as promoter/producer of the Monster Ball tour.

Fogel commented on Gaga's lack of experience in a tour and said that it was an opportunity for her. "As an artist with that kind of talent and vision emerges, it creates a lot of excitement, and ticket sales worldwide demonstrate that people are really excited to see the show. Over the course of the next many months we're trying to play to as many people in as many places as possible", Fogel added. "It's an across the board home run." Demands increased and another additional six dates were added to the announced itinerary. The Monster Ball sold-out shows in Toronto, Vancouver and San Jose who were compelled to add second dates in each city. In Los Angeles, to ensure that concert goers had the best possible access to tickets, a second performance was announced prior to the onsale of the first shows, and both Staples Center concerts were completely sold out. Billboard estimated that by the time the tour wraps up in 2011, it would have grossed close to US$200 million worldwide.

The ticket money from the final performance at Radio City was donated for the Haiti earthquake relief. Gaga announced on the rescheduled show at Elliott Hall of Music on January 26, 2010, that about US$500,000 was collected for the relief. At the 2010 Billboard Touring Awards, Gaga won the Breakthrough Performer Award, as well as the Concert Marketing & Promotion Award, the latter being an acknowledgement of her partnership with Virgin Mobile. Billboard also placed the Monster Ball Tour at position four on their Year-end Top 25 Tours of 2010. They reported that the tour had grossed US$116 million from 122 shows, with an audience of 1.3 million. By the end of the year, Pollstar announced that the tour had earned a total of US$133.6 million from 138 shows, making her the only woman to be placed in their list of the Top 10 Tours of 2010. Yet, for all the success of the tour, the first extension of the Monster Ball Tour almost bankrupted Lady Gaga, she told The Financial Times it left her $3m in debt.

The top grosser of the Monster Ball Tour were the two concerts at the Bell Centre in Montreal, which collectively earned over US$10 million. By amassing an audience of 111,060 from two shows, the performances at the Foro Sol in Mexico City attained the largest audience of the tour. Gaga's show at the United Center in Chicago became the highest-grossing concert of the third American leg; it earned an estimated US$1.8 million from 15,845 sold seats at a February 28, 2011 performance. The largest crowd, however, came from the Nashville market with 14,925 present at the Bridgestone Arena performance on April 19. The tour continued its presence in the Atlanta market on April 18, 2011, where she performed to 10,864 people at the Arena at Gwinnett Center. The third American leg concluded in Uniondale, New York with a sellout crowd of 13,195 at Nassau Veterans Memorial Coliseum on April 23, 2011. At the conclusion of 2011, the Monster Ball Tour grossed over US$70 million from 45 shows. By May 2011, the tour had grossed a total of US$227.4 million from the 200 reported shows, drawing an audience of 2.5 million, making it the highest-grossing tour in history by a debut headlining artist.

== Controversies ==
The tour became subject to numerous controversies. Kid Cudi's resignation as an opening act of the tour received widespread media attention. Many reports Cudi's resignation is due to during the Vancouver show on December 12, 2009, Cudi allegedly punched a fan. According to eyewitness accounts, the rapper mistook the fan, Michael Sharpe, for another concertgoer who had thrown a wallet onto the stage during his opening set. Sharpe has since said he has no plans to press charges against Cudi.

In Manchester, the June 3rd 2010 show, Gaga's performance of Alejandro where fake blood will spurt down on her chest as part of the performance, caused an outrage among fans and locals saying its overly sensitive after the shooting incident in Cumbria, England that happened a day before the said show. Gaga later downplayed this incident in the Washington, D.C. show on September 7, 2010, referring to the fake blood as "only fake monster fighting" during the concert.

Prior to the July 31st show in Phoenix, Arizona, Gaga has been receiving petitions from fans, activists, and numerous celebrities to cancel the said show of the tour due to Arizona's newly enacted immigration law SB1070. During the show, Gaga responded to “actively protest prejudice and injustice” to her fans. “I got a phone call from a couple really big rock ‘n’ rollers, big pop stars, big rappers, and they said, ‘We’d like you to boycott Arizona…because of SB 1070,’” Gaga also told the crowd. “And I said, ‘You really think that us dumb fucking pop stars are going to collapse the economy of Arizona?'”. Gaga’s stance contrasted with that of The Sound Strike, an organized effort by dozens of artists, including Rage Against the Machine’s Zack de La Rocha, to refuse live gigs in the state until SB 1070 is repealed. “I’ll tell you what we have to do about SB 1070,” Gaga said. “We have to be active. We have to actively protest, and the nature of the Monster Ball is to actively protest prejudice and injustice, and the bullshit that is put on our society.” “I will not cancel my show,” the star continued. “I will yell, and I will scream louder, and I will hold you, and we will hold each other, and we will peaceably protest this state. Do not be afraid, because if it wasn’t for all of you immigrants, this country wouldn’t have shit.”

== Broadcast and recordings ==
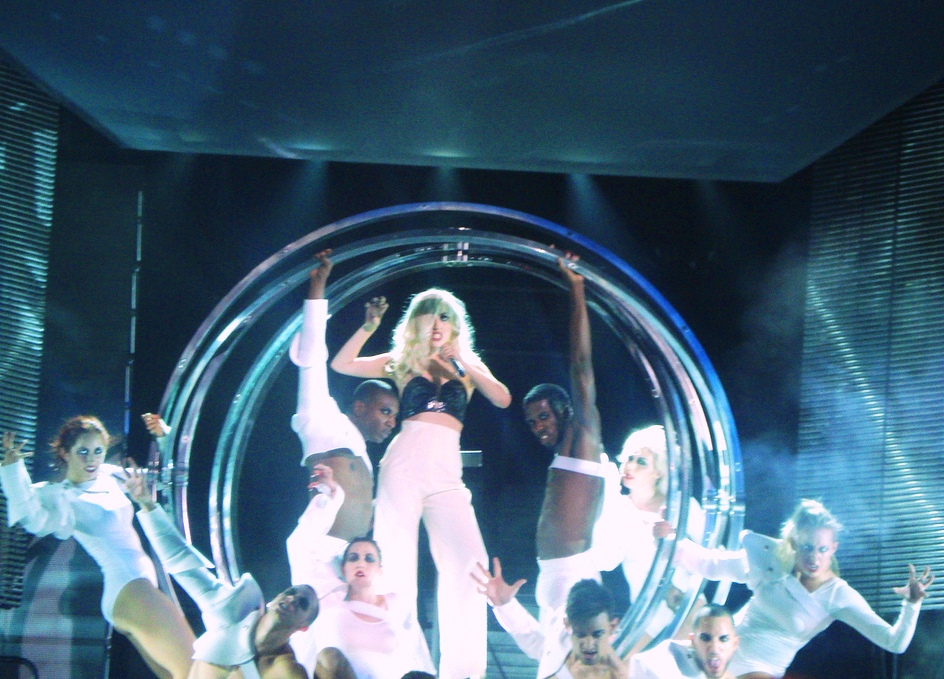
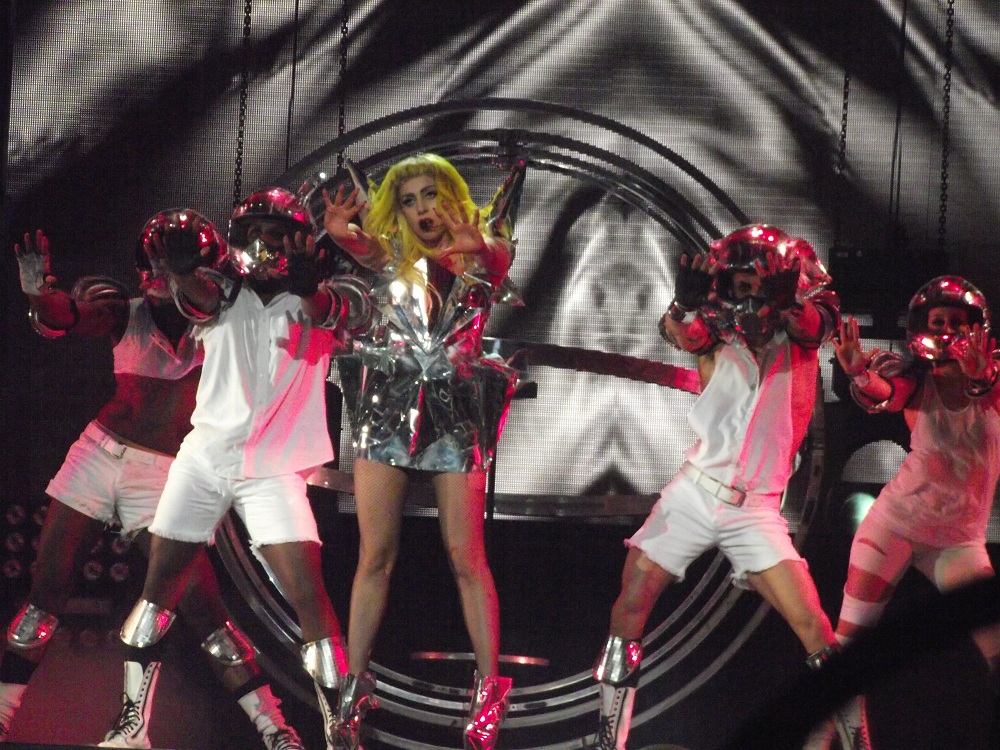
Both the performances of "Bad Romance" on the original (left) and the revamped (right) shows featured a giant gyroscope.

HBO filmed a special of the Monster Ball Tour during Gaga's February 21–22, 2011 shows at Madison Square Garden. The special, titled Lady Gaga Presents the Monster Ball Tour: At Madison Square Garden, aired on HBO on May 7, 2011, and Sky1 on May 21, 2011, in the United States and the United Kingdom respectively. Prime showed the special in New Zealand on June 2, 2011. The special showed the whole of the Monster Ball Tour, and some backstage footage, which was shown in black-and-white. It ended with another black-and-white backstage scene where Gaga and her backup singers perform "Born This Way" a capella.

After its broadcast, the special received critical acclaim; critics praised Gaga's performance, but doubted her sincerity during her on-stage rambling and in pre-concert scenes. The special was nominated for five honors at the 63rd Primetime Emmy Awards: Outstanding Variety, Music or Comedy Special; Outstanding Directing for a Variety, Music or Comedy Special; Outstanding Technical Direction, Camerawork, Video Control for a Miniseries, Movie or a Special; Outstanding Picture Editing for a Special (Single or Multi-Camera); and Outstanding Lighting Design/Lighting Direction for a Variety, Music or Comedy Special.

A video album was released for the special and includes extra footage like a capella performances and photo gallery. The 5.1 surround sound of the release utilized DTS-HD Master Audio and new technology to provide the viewer an optimum experience of watching the live concert. Emphasis was given on the main music and the vocals sung during the concert, while adjusting them against the screaming and the cheering of the crowd. The release was a commercial success, reaching the top of the DVD charts in the United States, France and Italy and the top-ten in other nations. It received double platinum certifications in Australia and France, while in the United Kingdom, it was certified gold.

== Set list ==
=== Original show ===
This set list is representative of the show on November 27, 2009. It does not represent all concerts for the duration of the tour.

1. "Dance in the Dark"
2. "Just Dance"
3. "LoveGame"
4. "Alejandro"
5. "Monster"
6. "So Happy I Could Die"
7. "Teeth"
8. "Speechless"
9. "Poker Face" (piano version)
10. "Fashion"
11. "The Fame"
12. "Money Honey"
13. "Beautiful, Dirty, Rich"
14. "Boys Boys Boys"
15. "Paper Gangsta"
16. "Poker Face"
17. "Paparazzi"

Encore

18. "Eh, Eh (Nothing Else I Can Say)"
19. "Bad Romance"

=== Revamped show ===
This set list is representative of the show on February 18, 2010. It does not represent all concerts for the duration of the tour.

1. "Dance in the Dark"
2. "Glitter and Grease"
3. "Just Dance"
4. "Beautiful, Dirty, Rich"
5. "Vanity"
6. "The Fame"
7. "LoveGame"
8. "Boys Boys Boys"
9. "Money Honey"
10. "Telephone"
11. "Brown Eyes"
12. "Speechless"
13. "You and I"
14. "So Happy I Could Die"
15. "Monster"
16. "Teeth"
17. "Alejandro"
18. "Poker Face"
19. "Paparazzi"

Encore

20. "Bad Romance"

=== Notes ===
- During the first performance in Saint Paul, Lady Gaga performed one of her unreleased songs, "Living on the Radio".
- The show in Budapest was interrupted with Gaga's acceptance speeches when she accepted her MTV EMA trophies via live satellite as the award show was at the same time as the concert.
- "Born This Way" was added to the encore on February 19, 2011.
- "Americano" and "Judas" were added to the set list on May 3, 2011.

== Shows ==
List of 2009 concerts
Date	City	Country	Venue	Opening acts	Attendance	Revenue
November 27, 2009	Montreal	Canada	Bell Centre	Kid Cudi; Semi Precious Weapons	12,013 / 12,832	$564,821
November 28, 2009	Toronto	Canada	Air Canada Centre	Kid Cudi; Semi Precious Weapons	12,265 / 12,265	$619,497
November 29, 2009	Ottawa	Canada	Scotiabank Place	Kid Cudi; Semi Precious Weapons	7,645 / 7,645	$375,875
December 1, 2009	Boston	United States	Wang Theatre	Kid Cudi; Semi Precious Weapons	7,056 / 7,056	$385,924
December 2, 2009	Boston	United States	Wang Theatre	Kid Cudi; Semi Precious Weapons	7,056 / 7,056	$385,924
December 3, 2009	Camden	United States	Susquehanna Bank Center	Kid Cudi; Semi Precious Weapons	7,143 / 7,143	$291,295
December 9, 2009	Vancouver	Canada	Queen Elizabeth Theatre	Kid Cudi; Semi Precious Weapons	8,220 / 8,220	$479,149
December 10, 2009	Vancouver	Canada	Queen Elizabeth Theatre	Kid Cudi; Semi Precious Weapons	8,220 / 8,220	$479,149
December 11, 2009	Vancouver	Canada	Queen Elizabeth Theatre	Kid Cudi; Semi Precious Weapons	8,220 / 8,220	$479,149
December 13, 2009	San Francisco	United States	Bill Graham Civic Auditorium	Kid Cudi; Semi Precious Weapons	17,000 / 17,000	$840,960
December 14, 2009	San Francisco	United States	Bill Graham Civic Auditorium	Kid Cudi; Semi Precious Weapons	17,000 / 17,000	$840,960
December 17, 2009	Las Vegas	United States	Pearl Concert Theater	—N/a	—N/a	—N/a
December 18, 2009	Las Vegas	United States	Pearl Concert Theater	—N/a	—N/a	—N/a
December 19, 2009	San Diego	United States	San Diego Sports Arena	—N/a	9,904 / 10,681	$445,680
December 21, 2009	Los Angeles	United States	Nokia Theatre L.A. Live	Kid Cudi; Semi Precious Weapons	20,559 / 20,559	$944,680
December 22, 2009	Los Angeles	United States	Nokia Theatre L.A. Live	Kid Cudi; Semi Precious Weapons	20,559 / 20,559	$944,680
December 23, 2009	Los Angeles	United States	Nokia Theatre L.A. Live	Kid Cudi; Semi Precious Weapons	20,559 / 20,559	$944,680
December 27, 2009	New Orleans	United States	Lakefront Arena	Jason Derulo; Semi Precious Weapons	6,217 / 6,217	$262,015
December 28, 2009	Atlanta	United States	Fabulous Fox Theatre	Jason Derulo; Semi Precious Weapons	8,897 / 8,897	$489,849
December 29, 2009	Atlanta	United States	Fabulous Fox Theatre	Jason Derulo; Semi Precious Weapons	8,897 / 8,897	$489,849
December 31, 2009	Miami	United States	Knight Theater	Jason Derulo; Semi Precious Weapons	9,365 / 9,365	$445,933
December 31, 2009	Miami Beach	United States	Fontainebleau Miami Beach	—N/a	—N/a	—N/a

List of 2010 concerts
Date	City	Country	Venue	Opening acts	Attendance	Revenue
January 2, 2010	Miami	United States	Knight Theater	Jason Derulo; Semi Precious Weapons	(Note: This score data is combined from the two shows held at the Knight Center on December 31, 2009 and January 2, 2010 respectively)	
January 3, 2010	Orlando	United States	UCF Arena	Jason Derulo; Semi Precious Weapons	6,753 / 6,785	$283,886
January 7, 2010	St. Louis	United States	Fox Theatre	Jason Derulo; Semi Precious Weapons	4,236 / 4,258	$278,885
January 8, 2010	Rosemont	United States	Rosemont Theatre	Jason Derulo; Semi Precious Weapons	12,712 / 13,032	$610,177
January 9, 2010	Rosemont	United States	Rosemont Theatre	Jason Derulo; Semi Precious Weapons	12,712 / 13,032	$610,177
January 10, 2010	Rosemont	United States	Rosemont Theatre	Jason Derulo; Semi Precious Weapons	12,712 / 13,032	$610,177
January 12, 2010	Detroit	United States	Joe Louis Arena	Jason Derulo; Semi Precious Weapons	16,084 / 16,648	$750,090
January 13, 2010	Detroit	United States	Joe Louis Arena	Jason Derulo; Semi Precious Weapons	16,084 / 16,648	$750,090
January 20, 2010	New York City	United States	Radio City Music Hall	Jason Derulo; Semi Precious Weapons	23,684 / 23,684	$1,360,515
January 21, 2010	New York City	United States	Radio City Music Hall	Jason Derulo; Semi Precious Weapons	23,684 / 23,684	$1,360,515
January 23, 2010	New York City	United States	Radio City Music Hall	Jason Derulo; Semi Precious Weapons	23,684 / 23,684	$1,360,515
January 24, 2010	New York City	United States	Radio City Music Hall	Jason Derulo; Semi Precious Weapons	23,684 / 23,684	$1,360,515
January 26, 2010 (Note: Originally scheduled for January 14, 2010, but was postponed due to exhaustion and dehydration.)	West Lafayette	United States	Elliott Hall of Music	Jason Derulo; Semi Precious Weapons	5,765 / 5,765	$198,893
February 18, 2010	Manchester	England	Manchester Evening News Arena	Alphabeat; Semi Precious Weapons	16,764 / 16,909	$759,233
February 20, 2010	Dublin	Ireland	The O_{2}	Alphabeat; Semi Precious Weapons	25,194 / 25,194	$1,225,970
February 21, 2010	Dublin	Ireland	The O_{2}	Alphabeat; Semi Precious Weapons	25,194 / 25,194	$1,225,970
February 22, 2010	Belfast	Northern Ireland	Odyssey Arena	Alphabeat; Semi Precious Weapons	10,038 / 10,038	$426,986
February 24, 2010	Liverpool	England	Echo Arena Liverpool	Alphabeat; Semi Precious Weapons	—N/a	—N/a
February 26, 2010	London	England	The O_{2} Arena	Alphabeat; Semi Precious Weapons	33,636 / 33,636	$1,564,080
February 27, 2010	London	England	The O_{2} Arena	Alphabeat; Semi Precious Weapons	33,636 / 33,636	$1,564,080
March 1, 2010	Glasgow	Scotland	Scottish Exhibition Hall 4	Alphabeat; Semi Precious Weapons	—N/a	—N/a
March 3, 2010	Cardiff	Wales	Cardiff International Arena	Alphabeat; Semi Precious Weapons	—N/a	—N/a
March 4, 2010	Newcastle	England	Metro Radio Arena	Alphabeat; Semi Precious Weapons	10,607 / 10,802	$466,898
March 5, 2010	Birmingham	England	LG Arena	Alphabeat; Semi Precious Weapons	14,750 / 14,750	$666,516
March 13, 2010	Auckland	New Zealand	Vector Arena	Semi Precious Weapons	23,084 / 23,936	$1,056,840
March 14, 2010	Auckland	New Zealand	Vector Arena	Semi Precious Weapons	23,084 / 23,936	$1,056,840
March 17, 2010	Sydney	Australia	Sydney Entertainment Centre	Semi Precious Weapons	35,460 / 35,460	$2,533,140
March 18, 2010	Sydney	Australia	Sydney Entertainment Centre	Semi Precious Weapons	35,460 / 35,460	$2,533,140
March 20, 2010	Newcastle	Australia	Newcastle Entertainment Centre	Alphabeat; Semi Precious Weapons	7,182 / 7,225	$527,770
March 23, 2010	Melbourne	Australia	Rod Laver Arena	Semi Precious Weapons	39,299 / 39,299	$2,679,010
March 24, 2010	Melbourne	Australia	Rod Laver Arena	Semi Precious Weapons	39,299 / 39,299	$2,679,010
March 26, 2010	Brisbane	Australia	Brisbane Entertainment Centre	Semi Precious Weapons	25,222 / 25,476	$2,065,210
March 27, 2010	Brisbane	Australia	Brisbane Entertainment Centre	Semi Precious Weapons	25,222 / 25,476	$2,065,210
March 29, 2010	Canberra	Australia	AIS Arena	Semi Precious Weapons	4,990 / 5,058	$328,569
April 1, 2010	Perth	Australia	Burswood Dome	Semi Precious Weapons	18,383 / 22,891	$1,746,560
April 3, 2010	Adelaide	Australia	Adelaide Entertainment Centre	Semi Precious Weapons	9,186 / 9,791	$629,515
April 5, 2010	Wollongong	Australia	WIN Entertainment Centre	Semi Precious Weapons	5,183 / 5,746	$349,420
April 7, 2010	Sydney	Australia	Sydney Entertainment Centre	Semi Precious Weapons	(Note: This score data is combined from the three shows held at the Sydney Entertainment Centre on March 17, March 18, and April 7 respectively)	
April 9, 2010	Melbourne	Australia	Rod Laver Arena	Semi Precious Weapons	(Note: This score data is combined from the three shows held at the Rod Laver Arena on March 23, March 24, and April 9 respectively)	
April 14, 2010	Kobe	Japan	Kobe World Kinen Hall	Far East Movement	—N/a	—N/a
April 15, 2010	Kobe	Japan	Kobe World Kinen Hall	Far East Movement	—N/a	—N/a
April 17, 2010	Yokohama	Japan	Yokohama Arena	Far East Movement	—N/a	—N/a
April 18, 2010	Yokohama	Japan	Yokohama Arena	Far East Movement	—N/a	—N/a
May 7, 2010	Stockholm	Sweden	Ericsson Globe	Semi Precious Weapons	26,213 / 33,853	$2,460,767
May 8, 2010	Stockholm	Sweden	Ericsson Globe	Semi Precious Weapons	26,213 / 33,853	$2,460,767
May 10, 2010	Hamburg	Germany	O2 World Hamburg	Semi Precious Weapons	7,010 / 10,500	$600,688
May 11, 2010	Berlin	Germany	O_{2} World	Semi Precious Weapons	8,263 / 13,304	$729,435
May 15, 2010	Arnhem	Netherlands	GelreDome XS	Semi Precious Weapons	20,371 / 34,561	$1,687,606
May 17, 2010	Antwerp	Belgium	Sportpaleis	Semi Precious Weapons	31,818 / 31,818	$2,483,340
May 18, 2010	Antwerp	Belgium	Sportpaleis	Semi Precious Weapons	31,818 / 31,818	$2,483,340
May 21, 2010	Paris	France	Palais Omnisports de Paris-Bercy	Semi Precious Weapons	31,474 / 31,552	$2,763,340
May 22, 2010	Paris	France	Palais Omnisports de Paris-Bercy	Semi Precious Weapons	31,474 / 31,552	$2,763,340
May 24, 2010	Oberhausen	Germany	König Pilsener Arena	Semi Precious Weapons	9,074 / 11,113	$828,477
May 25, 2010	Strasbourg	France	Zénith de Strasbourg	Semi Precious Weapons	10,869 / 10,869	$1,031,874
May 27, 2010	Nottingham	England	Trent FM Arena	Semi Precious Weapons	—N/a	—N/a
May 28, 2010	Birmingham	England	LG Arena	Semi Precious Weapons	14,153 / 14,968	$1,477,280
May 30, 2010	London	England	The O_{2} Arena	Semi Precious Weapons	34,159 / 34,176	$3,057,250
May 31, 2010	London	England	The O_{2} Arena	Semi Precious Weapons	34,159 / 34,176	$3,057,250
June 2, 2010	Manchester	England	Manchester Evening News Arena	Semi Precious Weapons	23,563 / 23,563	$2,247,800
June 3, 2010	Manchester	England	Manchester Evening News Arena	Semi Precious Weapons	23,563 / 23,563	$2,247,800
June 4, 2010	Sheffield	England	Motorpoint Arena	Semi Precious Weapons	—N/a	—N/a
June 28, 2010	Montreal	Canada	Bell Centre	Semi Precious Weapons	16,036 / 16,036	$1,686,050
July 1, 2010	Boston	United States	TD Garden	Semi Precious Weapons	—N/a	—N/a
July 2, 2010	Boston	United States	TD Garden	Semi Precious Weapons	—N/a	—N/a
July 4, 2010	Atlantic City	United States	Boardwalk Hall	Semi Precious Weapons	13,335 / 13,335	$1,824,963
July 6, 2010	New York City	United States	Madison Square Garden	Semi Precious Weapons	45,461 / 45,461	$5,083,454
July 7, 2010	New York City	United States	Madison Square Garden	Semi Precious Weapons	45,461 / 45,461	$5,083,454
July 9, 2010	New York City	United States	Madison Square Garden	Semi Precious Weapons	45,461 / 45,461	$5,083,454
July 11, 2010	Toronto	Canada	Air Canada Centre	Semi Precious Weapons	—N/a	—N/a
July 12, 2010	Toronto	Canada	Air Canada Centre	Semi Precious Weapons	—N/a	—N/a
July 14, 2010	Cleveland	United States	Quicken Loans Arena	Semi Precious Weapons	16,044 / 16,044	$1,719,165
July 15, 2010	Indianapolis	United States	Conseco Fieldhouse	Semi Precious Weapons	—N/a	—N/a
July 17, 2010	St. Louis	United States	Scottrade Center	Semi Precious Weapons	—N/a	—N/a
July 20, 2010	Oklahoma City	United States	Chesapeake Energy Arena	Semi Precious Weapons	—N/a	—N/a
July 22, 2010	Dallas	United States	American Airlines Center	Semi Precious Weapons	25,955 / 28,073	$2,965,424
July 23, 2010	Dallas	United States	American Airlines Center	Semi Precious Weapons	25,955 / 28,073	$2,965,424
July 25, 2010	Houston	United States	Toyota Center	Semi Precious Weapons	—N/a	—N/a
July 26, 2010	Houston	United States	Toyota Center	Semi Precious Weapons	—N/a	—N/a
July 28, 2010	Denver	United States	Pepsi Center	Semi Precious Weapons	—N/a	—N/a
July 31, 2010	Phoenix	United States	U.S. Airways Center	Semi Precious Weapons	—N/a	—N/a
August 3, 2010	Kansas City	United States	Sprint Center	Semi Precious Weapons	14,209 / 14,209	$1,497,528
August 6, 2010 (Note: The August 6, 2010 show was a part of the 2010 Lollapalooza.)	Chicago	United States	Grant Park	—N/a	80,000 / 80,000	$17,251,715
August 11, 2010	Los Angeles	United States	Staples Center	Semi Precious Weapons	29,211 / 29,593	$3,532,782
August 12, 2010	Los Angeles	United States	Staples Center	Semi Precious Weapons	29,211 / 29,593	$3,532,782
August 13, 2010	Las Vegas	United States	MGM Grand Garden Arena	Semi Precious Weapons	—N/a	—N/a
August 16, 2010	San Jose	United States	HP Pavilion	Semi Precious Weapons	—N/a	—N/a
August 17, 2010	San Jose	United States	HP Pavilion	Semi Precious Weapons	—N/a	—N/a
August 19, 2010	Portland	United States	Rose Garden	Semi Precious Weapons	13,149 / 13,149	$1,386,255
August 21, 2010	Tacoma	United States	Tacoma Dome	Semi Precious Weapons	—N/a	—N/a
August 23, 2010	Vancouver	Canada	Rogers Arena	Semi Precious Weapons	—N/a	—N/a
August 24, 2010	Vancouver	Canada	Rogers Arena	Semi Precious Weapons	—N/a	—N/a
August 26, 2010	Edmonton	Canada	Rexall Place	Semi Precious Weapons	28,282 / 28,282	$2,794,870
August 27, 2010	Edmonton	Canada	Rexall Place	Semi Precious Weapons	28,282 / 28,282	$2,794,870
August 30, 2010	Saint Paul	United States	Xcel Energy Center	Semi Precious Weapons	—N/a	—N/a
August 31, 2010	Saint Paul	United States	Xcel Energy Center	Semi Precious Weapons	—N/a	—N/a
September 2, 2010	Milwaukee	United States	Bradley Center	Semi Precious Weapons	—N/a	—N/a
September 4, 2010	Auburn Hills	United States	The Palace of Auburn Hills	Semi Precious Weapons	—N/a	—N/a
September 5, 2010	Pittsburgh	United States	Consol Energy Center	Semi Precious Weapons	—N/a	—N/a
September 7, 2010	Washington, D.C.	United States	Verizon Center	Semi Precious Weapons	14,528 / 14,528	$1,646,434
September 8, 2010	Charlottesville	United States	John Paul Jones Arena	Semi Precious Weapons	—N/a	—N/a
September 14, 2010	Philadelphia	United States	Wells Fargo Center	Semi Precious Weapons	30,487 / 30,487	$3,299,707
September 15, 2010	Philadelphia	United States	Wells Fargo Center	Semi Precious Weapons	30,487 / 30,487	$3,299,707
September 16, 2010	Hartford	United States	XL Center	Semi Precious Weapons	—N/a	—N/a
September 18, 2010	Charlotte	United States	Time Warner Cable Arena	Semi Precious Weapons	—N/a	—N/a
September 19, 2010	Raleigh	United States	RBC Center	Semi Precious Weapons	—N/a	—N/a
October 13, 2010	Helsinki	Finland	Hartwall Arena	Semi Precious Weapons	20,848 / 20,848	$1,917,300
October 14, 2010	Helsinki	Finland	Hartwall Arena	Semi Precious Weapons	20,848 / 20,848	$1,917,300
October 16, 2010	Oslo	Norway	Oslo Spektrum	Semi Precious Weapons	19,000 / 19,000	$1,900,000
October 17, 2010	Oslo	Norway	Oslo Spektrum	Semi Precious Weapons	19,000 / 19,000	$1,900,000
October 20, 2010	Herning	Denmark	Jyske Bank Boxen	Semi Precious Weapons	11,000 / 11,000	$1,342,000
October 26, 2010	Dublin	Ireland	The O_{2}	Semi Precious Weapons	37,676 / 37,676	$3,943,342
October 27, 2010	Dublin	Ireland	The O_{2}	Semi Precious Weapons	37,676 / 37,676	$3,943,342
October 29, 2010	Dublin	Ireland	The O_{2}	Semi Precious Weapons	37,676 / 37,676	$3,943,342
October 30, 2010	Belfast	Northern Ireland	Odyssey Arena	Semi Precious Weapons	—N/a	—N/a
November 1, 2010	Belfast	Northern Ireland	Odyssey Arena	Semi Precious Weapons	—N/a	—N/a
November 2, 2010	Belfast	Northern Ireland	Odyssey Arena	Semi Precious Weapons	—N/a	—N/a
November 5, 2010	Zagreb	Croatia	Arena Zagreb	Semi Precious Weapons	16,968 / 16,968	$1,484,755
November 7, 2010	Budapest	Hungary	Budapest Sports Arena	Semi Precious Weapons	13,000 / 13,000	$1,105,000
November 9, 2010	Turin	Italy	Torino Palasport Olimpico	Semi Precious Weapons	—N/a	—N/a
November 11, 2010	Vienna	Austria	Wiener Stadthalle	Semi Precious Weapons	11,100 / 11,100	$1,331,953
November 14, 2010	Zürich	Switzerland	Hallenstadion	Semi Precious Weapons	27,200 / 27,200	$3,025,800
November 15, 2010	Zürich	Switzerland	Hallenstadion	Semi Precious Weapons	27,200 / 27,200	$3,025,800
November 17, 2010	Prague	Czechia	O_{2} Arena	Semi Precious Weapons	17,000 / 17,000	$1,400,000
November 19, 2010	Malmö	Sweden	Malmö Arena	Semi Precious Weapons	—N/a	—N/a
November 22, 2010	Antwerp	Belgium	Sportpaleis	Semi Precious Weapons	31,941 / 31,941	$2,772,040
November 23, 2010	Antwerp	Belgium	Sportpaleis	Semi Precious Weapons	31,941 / 31,941	$2,772,040
November 26, 2010	Gdańsk	Poland	Ergo Arena	Semi Precious Weapons	15,000 / 15,000	$1,350,000
November 29, 2010	Rotterdam	Netherlands	Rotterdam Ahoy	Semi Precious Weapons	—N/a	—N/a
November 30, 2010	Rotterdam	Netherlands	Rotterdam Ahoy	Semi Precious Weapons	—N/a	—N/a
December 2, 2010	Lyon	France	Halle Tony Garnier	Semi Precious Weapons	—N/a	—N/a
December 4, 2010	Milan	Italy	Mediolanum Forum	Semi Precious Weapons	—N/a	—N/a
December 5, 2010	Milan	Italy	Mediolanum Forum	Semi Precious Weapons	—N/a	—N/a
December 7, 2010	Barcelona	Spain	Palau Sant Jordi	Semi Precious Weapons	—N/a	—N/a
December 10, 2010	Lisbon	Portugal	Pavilhão Atlântico	Semi Precious Weapons	16,000 / 16,000	$1,400,000
December 12, 2010	Madrid	Spain	Palacio de Deportes	Semi Precious Weapons	—N/a	—N/a
December 16, 2010	London	England	The O_{2} Arena	Semi Precious Weapons	33,222 / 36,800	$4,770,997
December 17, 2010	London	England	The O_{2} Arena	Semi Precious Weapons	33,222 / 36,800	$4,770,997
December 20, 2010 (Note: Both shows in Paris were originally scheduled for October 22 and 23, 2010, but were rescheduled due to security measures.)	Paris	France	Palais Omnisports de Paris-Bercy	Semi Precious Weapons	31,374 / 36,151	$2,912,633
December 21, 2010	Paris	France	Palais Omnisports de Paris-Bercy	Semi Precious Weapons	31,374 / 36,151	$2,912,633

List of 2011 concerts
Date	City	Country	Venue	Opening acts	Attendance	Revenue
February 19, 2011	Atlantic City	United States	Boardwalk Hall	Scissor Sisters	13,492 / 13,492	$1,609,752
February 21, 2011	New York City	United States	Madison Square Garden	Scissor Sisters	28,949 / 28,949	$3,211,580
February 22, 2011	New York City	United States	Madison Square Garden	Scissor Sisters	28,949 / 28,949	$3,211,580
February 24, 2011	Washington, D.C.	United States	Verizon Center	Scissor Sisters	15,080 / 15,080	$1,670,331
February 26, 2011	Pittsburgh	United States	Consol Energy Center	Scissor Sisters	14,713 / 14,713	$1,554,415
February 28, 2011	Chicago	United States	United Center	Scissor Sisters	15,845 / 15,845	$1,801,457
March 1, 2011	Grand Rapids	United States	Van Andel Arena	Scissor Sisters	11,992 / 11,992	$1,227,096
March 3, 2011	Toronto	Canada	Air Canada Centre	Scissor Sisters	16,488 / 16,488	$1,887,085
March 4, 2011	Buffalo	United States	HSBC Arena	Scissor Sisters	15,512 / 15,512	$1,580,602
March 6, 2011	Ottawa	Canada	Scotiabank Place	Scissor Sisters	14,250 / 14,250	$1,515,657
March 8, 2011	Boston	United States	TD Garden	Scissor Sisters	14,361 / 14,361	$1,525,663
March 10, 2011	Columbus	United States	Schottenstein Center	Scissor Sisters	13,229 / 13,229	$1,369,378
March 12, 2011	Louisville	United States	KFC Yum! Center	Scissor Sisters	17,270 / 17,270	$1,678,962
March 14, 2011	Dallas	United States	American Airlines Center	Scissor Sisters	13,546 / 13,546	$1,369,067
March 15, 2011	San Antonio	United States	AT&T Center	Scissor Sisters	14,257 / 14,257	$1,462,754
March 17, 2011	Omaha	United States	Qwest Center Omaha	Scissor Sisters	15,313 / 15,313	$1,606,232
March 19, 2011	Salt Lake City	United States	EnergySolutions Arena	Scissor Sisters	14,385 / 14,385	$1,313,005
March 22, 2011	Oakland	United States	Oracle Arena	Scissor Sisters	15,913 / 15,913	$1,563,797
March 23, 2011	Sacramento	United States	ARCO Arena	Scissor Sisters	14,285 / 14,285	$1,302,951
March 25, 2011	Las Vegas	United States	MGM Grand Garden Arena	Scissor Sisters	14,119 / 14,119	$1,712,826
March 26, 2011	Phoenix	United States	U.S. Airways Center	Scissor Sisters	14,166 / 14,166	$1,386,115
March 28, 2011	Los Angeles	United States	Staples Center	Scissor Sisters	14,883 / 14,883	$1,555,784
March 29, 2011	San Diego	United States	Viejas Arena	Scissor Sisters	9,655 / 9,655	$1,147,055
March 31, 2011	Anaheim	United States	Honda Center	Scissor Sisters	13,026 / 13,026	$1,380,353
April 4, 2011	Tulsa	United States	BOK Center	Semi Precious Weapons	13,710 / 13,710	$1,322,897
April 6, 2011	Austin	United States	Frank Erwin Center	Semi Precious Weapons	12,904 / 12,904	$1,295,938
April 8, 2011	Houston	United States	Toyota Center	Semi Precious Weapons	13,412 / 13,412	$1,401,330
April 9, 2011	New Orleans	United States	New Orleans Arena	Semi Precious Weapons	13,513 / 13,513	$1,392,998
April 12, 2011	Sunrise	United States	BankAtlantic Center	Semi Precious Weapons	13,398 / 13,398	$1,442,679
April 13, 2011	Miami	United States	American Airlines Arena	Semi Precious Weapons	14,695 / 14,695	$1,573,090
April 15, 2011	Orlando	United States	Amway Center	Semi Precious Weapons	13,451 / 13,451	$1,460,286
April 16, 2011	Tampa	United States	St. Pete Times Forum	Semi Precious Weapons	15,134 / 15,134	$1,506,017
April 18, 2011	Duluth	United States	Arena at Gwinnett Center	Semi Precious Weapons	10,864 / 10,864	$1,173,392
April 19, 2011	Nashville	United States	Bridgestone Arena	Semi Precious Weapons	14,925 / 14,925	$1,485,607
April 22, 2011	Newark	United States	Prudential Center	Semi Precious Weapons	14,809 / 14,809	$1,500,885
April 23, 2011	Uniondale	United States	Nassau Coliseum	Semi Precious Weapons	13,195 / 13,195	$1,393,404
April 25, 2011	Montreal	Canada	Bell Centre	Semi Precious Weapons	16,417 / 16,417	$1,765,492
April 27, 2011	Cleveland	United States	Quicken Loans Arena	Semi Precious Weapons	14,857 / 14,857	$1,499,897
May 3, 2011	Guadalajara	Mexico	Estadio Tres de Marzo	Semi Precious Weapons	29,047 / 29,047	$2,559,232
May 5, 2011	Mexico City	Mexico	Foro Sol	Semi Precious Weapons	111,060 / 111,060	$6,699,708
May 6, 2011	Mexico City	Mexico	Foro Sol	Semi Precious Weapons	111,060 / 111,060	$6,699,708
Total					1,583,999 / 1,598,857 (99%)	$137,346,115

== Personnel ==
Credits and personnel as per the Monster Ball Tour (original and revised show) booklets.

- Show Director – Arthur Fogel
- Creative Directors – Matthew "Dada" Williams and Willo Perron
- Choreographer – Laurie-Ann Gibson, Travis Payne
- Assistant Choreographer – Richard Jackson
- Stylist – Nicola Formichetti
- Stylist Assistant – Anna Trevelyan, Emily Eisen
- Hair Stylist – Frederic Aspiras
- Make Up Artists – Tara Savelo and Sarah Nicole Tanno
- Video Director – Nick Knight and Haus of Gaga
- Video Editor – Ruth Hogben, Kevin Stenning (BURSTvisual)
- Video Programmer – Matt Shimamoto
- Lighting Company – Production Resource Group (PRG)
- Live Video – Nocturne Video
- Lighting Design – Willie Williams
- Lighting Director – Ethan Weber
- Management – Troy Carter
- Finances – TMI Productions
- Legal – Ziffren Brittenham LLP
- Promoters – Live Nation Global Touring (Worldwide) and AEG Live (UK)
- Tour Sponsors – Virgin Mobile (US) and M.A.C Cosmetics (Worldwide)
- Dancers – Michael Silas, Ian McKenzie, Asiel Hardison, Graham Breitenstein, Montana Efaw, Sloan Taylor-Rabinor, Amanda Balen, Molly d'Amour, Mark Kanemura, Jeremy Hudson, Cassidy Noblett, and Victor Rojas

Original shows (2009–10)

- Musical Director – Jeff Bhasker
- Set Design – Es Devlin
- Set Builder – Tait Towers
- The Orbit – Nasir Mazhar and Haus of Gaga
- Costume Design – Haus of Gaga with Franc Fernandez, Gary Card, Maison Martin Margiela, Miguel Villalobos, Oscar O Lima and Zaldy Goco
- Keytar – Lady Gaga
- Guitar – Adam Smirnoff
- Drums – Charles Haynes
- Keyboards – Pete Kuzma
- Keyboards/Bass – Mitch Cohn

Revised shows (2010–11)

- Musical Director – Joe "Flip" Wilson
- Set Design – Roy Bennett
- Set Builder – Tait Towers
- Set Sculptures – Nick Knight and Kevin Stenning
- Costume Design – Haus of Gaga with Giorgio Armani, Miuccia Prada, Philip Treacy, Charlie le Mindu, Jaiden rVa James, Rachel Barrett, Gary Card, Keko Hainswheeler, Atsuko Kudo, Alex Noble, Zaldy Goco, Alun Davies, Marko Mitanovski, Alexander McQueen, and NOKI
- Emma and Keytar – Lady Gaga
- Guitars – Ricky Tillo and Kareem Devlin
- Drums – George "Spanky" McCurdy
- Keyboards – Brockett Parsons
- Bass – Lanar "Kern" Brantley
- Electric Violin – Judy Kang
- Harp – Rashida Jolley
- Backing vocals – Posh, Charity Davis, Ameera Perkins, Lenesha Randolph, Taneka Samone Duggan, Chevonne Ianuzzi, and Jasmine Morrow

== See also ==
- List of highest-grossing concert tours by women
