= Alejandro (song) =

2010 single by Lady Gaga

Single by Lady Gaga

from the EP The Fame Monster
- Released: April 20, 2010
- Studio: FC Walvisch (Amsterdam)
- Genre: Dance-pop; synth-pop
- Length: 4:34
- Label: Streamline; KonLive; Cherrytree; Interscope
- Songwriters: RedOne; Lady Gaga
- Producer: RedOne

Lady Gaga singles chronology
| "Telephone" (2010) | "Alejandro" (2010) | "Dance in the Dark" (2010) |

Music video
- "Alejandro" on YouTube

"Alejandro" is a song by the American singer Lady Gaga from her third extended play (EP), The Fame Monster (2009)—the reissue of her album The Fame (2008). It was released as the third single from The Fame Monster on April 20, 2010. Written and co-produced by Gaga alongside the Moroccan-Swedish producer RedOne, "Alejandro" was inspired by Gaga's fear of men and is about her bidding farewell to her Latino lovers named Alejandro, Roberto and Fernando. Musically, it is a dance-pop and synth-pop song with Europop and Latin pop beats, and it opens with a sample from the main melody of Vittorio Monti's "Csárdás".

Upon its release, "Alejandro" received generally mixed reviews from music critics; some praised the song's catchiness and production while others criticized it as unoriginal, mainly due to the influence from the Swedish pop groups ABBA and Ace of Base. Retrospective reviewers ranked the song as one of Gaga's best singles. Commercially, "Alejandro" was a global success, topping the record charts in Croatia, Finland, Greece, Hungary, Mexico, Poland, Russia and Venezuela. It was a Top 5 hit single in Australia, Brazil, Canada, Denmark, France, Germany, Italy, Spain and the United States. In a 2017 journal, which studied structural patterns in melodies of earworm songs, the American Psychological Association (APA) called "Alejandro" one of the world's catchiest.

The accompanying music video, directed by American fashion photographer Steven Klein, was inspired by Gaga's admiration of her gay friends and gay love. In the video, Gaga dances with male soldiers in a cabaret, interspersed with scenes of near-naked men holding machine guns and the singer playing a nun who swallows a rosary. Critics complimented the music video's idea and dark nature, and compared it with the work of 1980s artists. The Catholic League criticized Gaga's use of religious symbols in the video. Retrospective commentators analyzed the music video's themes, including BDSM, anti-fascism, sexual violence and religion. Gaga performed "Alejandro" on the ninth season of American Idol and many of her concert tours and residency shows.

== Background and release ==
Lady Gaga and RedOne wrote "Alejandro"; they also worked on vocal arrangement and background vocals. RedOne served as the main producer, with Gaga co-producing with him. He also solely handled instrumentation, programming and recording, and worked with Eelco Bakker on audio engineering. The song was mixed by Robert Orton and mastered by Gene Grimaldi. Johnny Severin did vocal editing. "Alejandro" was recorded at FC Walvisch Studios in Amsterdam.

Interscope Records planned to release "Dance in the Dark" as the third single from the extended play (EP) The Fame Monster (2009)—the reissue of Gaga's debut studio album, The Fame (2008). Her own choice, "Alejandro", initially saw poor airplay and was not seen as a viable choice. Following a quarrel between Gaga and her label, "Alejandro" was chosen as the third single. Through her account on Twitter, Gaga remarked on the decision, "Alejandro is on the radio. Fuck it sounds so good, we did it little monsters." The single was officially sent to radio on April 20, 2010, in the United States. She told Fuse TV that the inspiration behind "Alejandro" was her "Fear of Men Monster". According to NME, Gaga longs for the affection of her ex-lovers but rejects them, fearing commitment and abandonment.

== Music and lyrics ==
"Alejandro" is a dance-pop and synth-pop song with what Billboard describes as a "romping, stomping Euro-pop beat". "Alejandro" opens with the main melody from the piece "Csárdás" (1904) by Italian composer Vittorio Monti played on violin, as a distressed Gaga states in a Spanish accent: "I know that we are young, and I know that you may love me/But I just can't be with you like this anymore, Alejandro." In a Cambridge University Press-published journal analyzing Gaga's "musical intertexts" on The Fame Monster, authors Lori Burns, Alyssa Woods and Marc Lafrance described her voice during this passage as "compressed and filtered to create a distant but focused effect". Gaga sings the pre-chorus where she describes her relationship as problematic and lets her lover know about making a choice: "You know that I love you, boy/Hot like Mexico, rejoice!/At this point I've got to choose/Nothing to lose." By the song's end, Gaga bids her lovers—Alejandro, Fernando, and Roberto—farewell.

"Alejandro"
A 27-second sample of the song's Latin pop-influenced chorus, backed by synth-beats. The lyrics have Gaga reject her three lovers.

According to the sheet music published at Musicnotes.com by Sony/ATV Music Publishing, the song is set in the time signature of common time, with a moderate tempo of 99 beats per minute. It is composed in the key of B minor with Gaga's vocal range spanning from F♯_{3} to G_{4}. The song has a basic sequence of Bm–D–F♯m as its chord progression. "Alejandro" is influenced by Ace of Base and ABBA, particularly the latter's 1975 song "Fernando". Burns, Woods and Lafrance believed by referencing "Fernando", which was popular within the gay community, Gaga identifies as an advocate for the rights of marginalized minorities. This is solidified by the influence of Latin pop songs in the chorus, especially Shakira's "Whenever, Wherever" (2001) and Madonna's "La Isla Bonita" (1987), which had commercial success in the LGBTQ community. Comparing the song with Ace of Base's "Don't Turn Around" (1994)—which tells the story of a woman left by her male lover—Burns, Woods and Lafrance added that "Alejandro" switches this concept where Gaga initiates the break-up. As such, the song shows Gaga's commitment to feminism and "liberat[ing]" performance art. Eve Barlow of Vulture praised Gaga's outspoken sex-positive feminism in the song, exemplified by the lyrics "don't want to kiss, don't want to touch/Just smoke my cigarette and hush".

In the European Journal of Media Studies, Anne Kustritz wrote that "Alejandro" showed Gaga's use of "unending semiotic shell game". She felt that the names Alejandro, Roberto and Fernando, the word "Mexico", and the brief Spanish lyrics confirmed either that the song is set in Latin America or Gaga's lover is Hispanic. Kustritz believed that, beyond these instances, the song conveyed little about Mexico, Latin America or intercultural relationships. Confused by the song's constant shift of viewpoint from "I" to "You" to "She", Kustritz noted how certain phrases (Note: "Halo", which she believed references Christianity and "boyfriend like a dad", which has "potential feminist or psychoanalytic concerns") introduce themes but do not develop them further and "merely appear, like drunken lyrical mad lib fill-ins. Words seem to have been positioned in 'Alejandro' not because they convey meaning but because of how they sound, a strategy which reverses the usual insistence that the signified trumps the formal properties of the signifier."

== Critical reception and accolades ==
Earlier critical reception to "Alejandro" was mixed. The song was called a summer-friendly track (BBC), a "lush paean to a love that's 'hot like Mexico'" (MTV News), "brilliantly catchy, deceptively simple and wonderfully melancholy" (MusicOMH), and light-hearted (NME and Los Angeles Times). Robert Copsey of Digital Spy praised the song's melodies, describing them as "deceptively catchy" and the lyrics as "wistful". In a mixed review, Jon Blistein of L Magazine wrote that "Alejandro" and "Monster", another track from The Fame Monster, are "half-decent club/pop songs in their own right—and much more well-organized than 'Bad Romance'—they don't seem like complete thoughts".

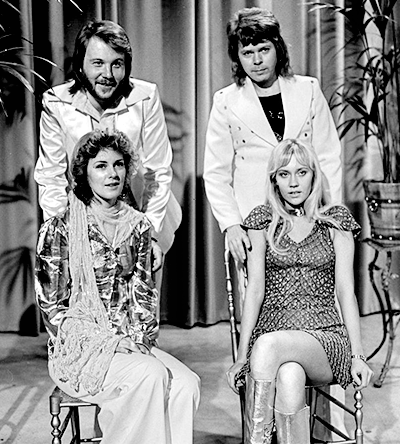
"Alejandro" was compared in multiple reviews to the music of Swedish band ABBA (pictured in 1974), particularly their 1975 single, "Fernando".

Comparisons with other artists, especially ABBA and Ace of Base's work, were constant in reviews. Reviews from Slant Magazine and Rolling Stone believed the song paid a delightful tribute to ABBA. It was described as a modernized version of an ABBA song by AllMusic and Pitchfork critics. In a five-out-of-five-star review, Copsey recognized similarities to "La Isla Bonita" and Ace of Base songs, but felt that Gaga added "her own inimitable twist too". Comparing the song to "Don't Turn Around" and "Fernando", Lindsey Fortier from Billboard added, "By the song's end, Alejandro, Fernando and Roberto aren't the only ones sent packing—the listener is dancing out right behind them." Sociologist Mathieu Deflem dismissed the criticism of the song as an "ABBA rip-off" as he believed the reference to the band was intentional by RedOne who is also from Sweden. Other comparisons of the song included with Madonna's 1987 single "Who's That Girl" and Shakira in the chorus.

Some reviews were negative. Sarah Hajibagheri from The Times dismissed it as a "painful Latino warble [and] a would-be Eurovision reject". The Boston Globe's James Reed criticized it as "a tepid dance track" where she needlessly repeats the song's title. Nathan Pensky of PopMatters felt that it is "a song truly made up of nothing, not even bothering to revel in its vacuity". Acknowledging its catchiness, Pensky opined that making a simple pop song was not enough, especially considering the quality of Gaga's other songs—"Bad Romance" and "Telephone".

In retrospect, the song was ranked as one of Gaga's best by NME, The Guardian, Belfast Telegraph, Rolling Stone, Billboard and Vulture. (Note: Attributed to multiple references) It was considered one of "Gaga's most enduring singles" by The Guardian, and one of her catchiest pop songs by Vulture. Belfast Telegraph approvingly highlighted "the inexplicably European lilt" in the spoken-word lyrics and "the femme-fatale chilliness of its chorus". For Billboard, "The sweaty, stomping production ramps up during one of Gaga's simplest, most effective hooks to date." On the song's 10-year anniversary, Mike Wass of Idolator complimented it for still sounding "as audacious and addictive as it did back then", concluding that "every element of 'Alejandro' comes together perfectly to create dance-pop bliss".

"Alejandro" won an International Dance Music Award for Best Pop Dance Track and a BMI Pop Award for Most-Performed Songs of the Year. It received nominations for a Gaygalan Award for International Song of the Year and a Rockbjörnen prize for Foreign Song of the Year. A 2017 journal, published by Psychology of Aesthetics, Creativity, and the Arts studying structural patterns in the melodies of earworm songs, compiled lists of catchiest tracks from 3,000 participants, in which "Alejandro" ranked number eight.

== Commercial performance ==
In the United States, "Alejandro" debuted at number 72 on the Billboard Hot 100 for the chart issue dated April 17, 2010. The same week, the song debuted on the Mainstream Top 40 chart at number 35, and the Hot Digital Songs chart at number 71, after selling 24,000 paid digital downloads according to Nielsen Soundscan. The song went on to reach a peak of number five on the Hot 100, becoming Gaga's seventh consecutive top ten single in the nation. As a result, she became the most recent female artist to have her first seven singles reach top-ten threshold in the US, since R&B singer Monica did so from 1995 to 1999, with Gaga eclipsing this rate by doing so in only 17 months. On the Mainstream Top 40 chart, "Alejandro" peaked at number four, becoming Gaga's first single not to reach the number one position there. It also debuted on the Hot Dance Club Songs chart at 40 and reached the top spot on the chart issue dated July 7, 2010. The song has sold 2.63 million digital downloads in the US as of February 2019, making Gaga the second artist in digital history to amass seven consecutive two million sellers as a lead act. The track was certified quadruple platinum by the Recording Industry Association of America (RIAA) in October 2017. On the Canadian Hot 100, "Alejandro" peaked at number four on the issue dated May 8, 2010.

On the ARIA Singles Chart (Australia), "Alejandro" peaked at number two, becoming Gaga's seventh top-five hit in the country. "Alejandro" was certified quadruple platinum by the Australian Recording Industry Association (ARIA) for shipment of 280,000 copies of the single. The song peaked at number 11 on the New Zealand Top 40. With the release of The Fame Monster in November 2009, "Alejandro" charted on the UK Singles Chart at number 75. It peaked at number seven in 2010, becoming her sixth top ten song in the UK. According to the Official Charts Company, "Alejandro" has sold a total of 436,000 copies as of February 2014, and was certified platinum by the British Phonographic Industry (BPI) in 2020. They listed it as the 37th best-selling vinyl single in the UK for the 2010s. Across Europe, the song reached the top five in Austria, the Ultratop charts of Belgium (Flanders and Wallonia), Czech Republic, Denmark, France, Germany, Hungary, Ireland, Italy, Netherlands, Norway, Slovakia, Sweden and Switzerland, topping the charts in Finland, Greece, Poland, Romania and Russia.

== Music video ==
=== Development and release ===
In January 2010, Gaga began casting for the music video of "Alejandro". It was directed by photographer Steven Klein, whom Gaga considered the right choice as he understood her "I am what I wear" lifestyle, theater background, "love of music and love of the lie in art". She discussed her respect for Klein. "[W]e've been excited to collaborate and have a fashion photographer tell us a story, the story of my music through his lens and this idea of fashion and lifestyle."

The video thematizes military homoeroticism and celebrates Gaga's admiration of the gay community. She explained it is about the "purity of my friendships with my gay friends, and how I've been unable to find that with a straight man in my life. It's a celebration and an admiration of gay love—it confesses my envy of the courage and bravery they require to be together. In the video I'm pining for the love of my gay friends—but they just don't want me to be with them." For Klein, the video is "about a woman's desire to resurrect a dead love and who can not face the brutality of her present situation. The pain of living without your true love."

On the television talk show Larry King Live (2010), Gaga released a black-and-white portion from the video, in which she and her dancers perform variations on a sharp military march throughout. The video premiered on Gaga's official website and her YouTube and Vevo accounts on June 8, 2010. Days after the video's release, Gaga posted on her Twitter account: "Men are men ... A soldier is a soldier." Anne Kustritz wrote that it was posted at a time when she was publicly opposing "don't ask, don't tell", a policy by the United States Armed Forces, which prohibited discrimination against closeted homosexuals but also barred openly gay people from military service. Kustritz opined the video hardly portrayed this and it was unclear whether it was for or against the policy.

=== Synopsis ===
The video was inspired by the Broadway musical Cabaret (1966), anti-fascism, religion, BDSM, sexual violence and the gay scene in 1920s Berlin. It begins with soldiers in black leather uniforms (designed by Emporio Armani) in a cabaret. This is followed by a close-up of a soldier passed out in fishnet stockings and heels as another lone soldier stares into the distance. The scene then cuts to male dancers performing elaborate choreography while marching forward with a Star of David. As the song's intro begins, Gaga is shown leading a funeral procession and carrying the Sacred Heart on a pillow. When the lyrics begin, she sits on a throne in an elaborate headpiece and binocular-like eyepieces, holding a smoking pipe and watching her dancers perform a rigorous routine in the snow. Playing the character Sally Bowles from Cabaret in the following scene, Gaga dances and simulates sex acts with three men on a stage with twin beds, intercut with shots of her lying on a larger bed dressed in a red latex nun outfit.

Gaga appears dressed in a white hooded robe reminiscent of Joan of Arc, interspersed with a shot of her as a nun consuming rosary beads. Gaga and her dancers in military uniforms are shown in a black-and-white sequence, performing a tribute to the late choreographer Bob Fosse, the director of the film version of Cabaret. Gaga is seen in a blonde bob and a similar outfit to one of Liza Minnelli's performance costumes. The video shows a scene of her in a machine gun-equipped bra and her dancers. After a shot of her in an empty club, scenes of war breaking out flash by, and the lone soldier appears again. Going back to the Joan of Arc scene, she struggles with her dancers and disrobes. The video ends with her dressed as the nun, and the picture burns outwards.

Anne Kustritz believed the video is possibly set in post-World War II Argentina where Gaga's character is seduced by Nazi fugitives assuming false Spanish identities but opined that the video barely shows Latin America or Mexico. Author Joshua S. Walden saw vague allusions to a Hispanic location through the Catholic references with crucifix iconography, the red nun habit and the rosary. James Montgomery thought the video was a tribute to pre-Nazi Germany, elaborating that the "carefully crafted close-ups, languorously smoked cigarettes and oppressively cut costumes" evoke the "artistically fertile but politically and economically difficult era" before Adolf Hitler's rise to power.

=== Reception ===
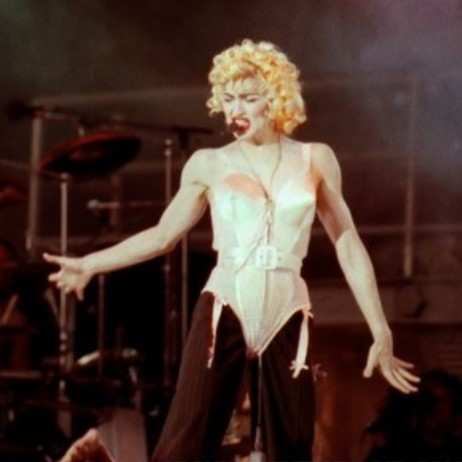
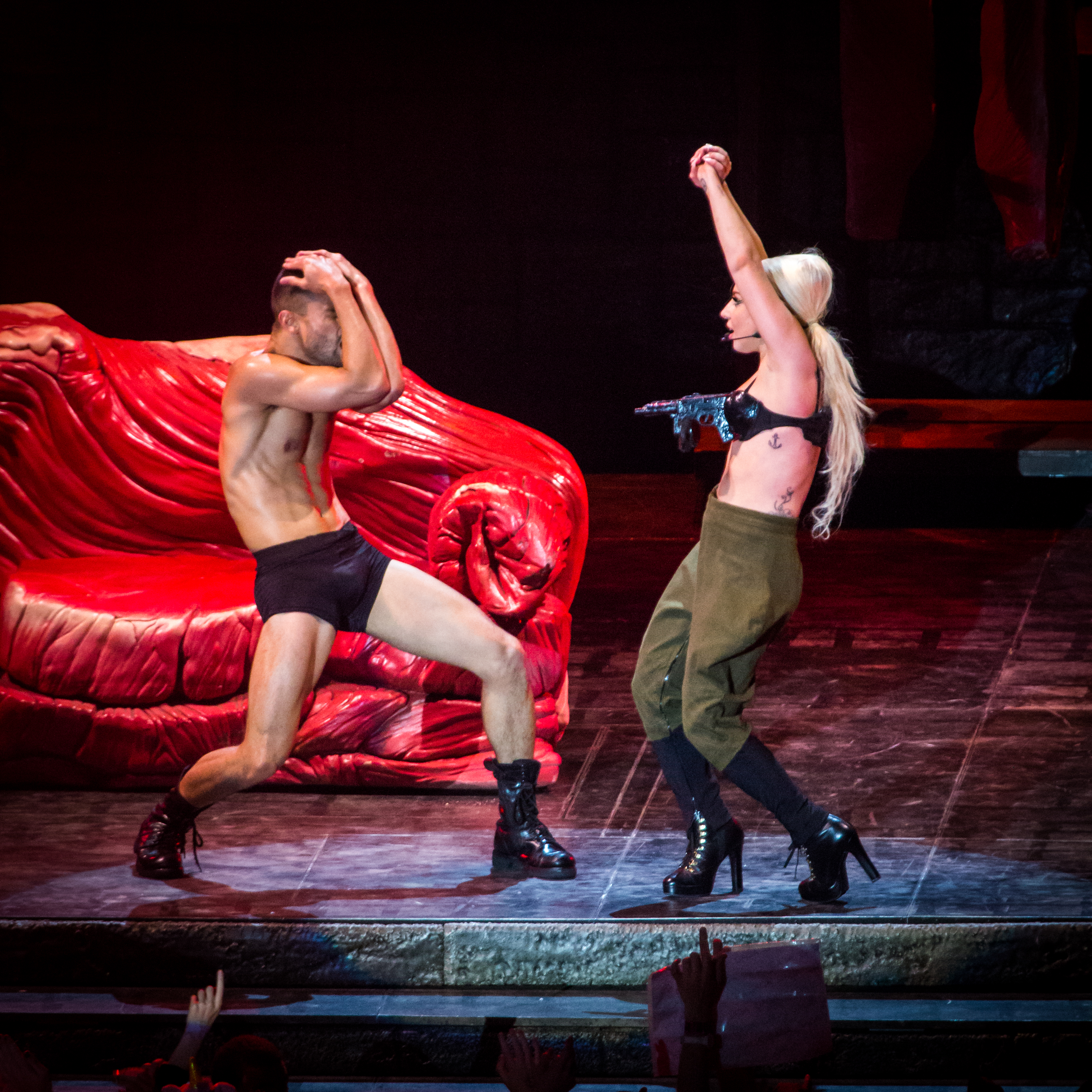
Elements of the video were compared to the work of Madonna (pictured left in 1990), including Gaga's gun bra, which she again donned for the performance of "Alejandro" (pictured right) during her Born This Way Ball (2012–2013).

The music video received mostly positive critical reviews. It was nominated for a MuchMusic Video Award for Most Streamed Video of the Year. Praise focused on the video's dark themes and imagery. James Montgomery from MTV News commented that "Gaga has created a world that, while oppressive, also looks great" and added in another piece that "she may have finally reached the point in her career where not even she can top herself." Rolling Stone's Daniel Kreps labeled the video a "cinematic epic", and Nate Jones of Time was impressed with the combination of "self-conscious ballsiness of Gaga and director Steven Klein". Randall Roberts from the Los Angeles Times said that "the clip reinforces the notion that no one understands the convergence of image and music right now better than Gaga." Other critics praised the video's quality but thought it was not on par with Gaga's previous videos, mainly "Bad Romance" and "Telephone".

Critics took note of the video's length, shock value and complicated storyline. Jen Dose from National Post commented that "Alejandro" was another instance of Gaga's extravagance in her work. The story was described as complicated by some critics, although Jed Gottlieb from the Boston Herald noted its lack of a happy ending. Anthony Benigno from New York Daily News felt that "the shock songstress' new music video ... is chock full of bed-ridden S&M imagery that makes it look like the softcore answer to The Matrix" (1999).

Reviewers saw references to artists Janet Jackson, Madonna, Laibach and The Three Stooges, as well as the films Frankenstein (1931), Triumph of the Will (1935) and Snow White and the Seven Dwarfs (1937). Because of the video's military theme, comparisons were made to Jackson's Rhythm Nation (1989). The connection to Madonna was made mainly with her film Evita (1996), and the videos for her songs "Like a Prayer" (1989), "Human Nature" (1995), "Express Yourself" (1989) and "Vogue" (1990). According to Devon Thomas from CBS News, "Express Yourself" influenced Gaga's short, cropped hair and black blazer "set against the stark, post-industrialist mood" in "Alejandro". Thomas considered the video "a visual love letter" to Madonna, particularly of the Blond Ambition World Tour era. The resemblance to "Vogue" was the black-and-white cinematography, Dolce & Gabbana vest, Francesco Scognamiglio pantsuit and machine-gun bra. (Note: Madonna wore a cone bra in the music video for "Vogue".) Some reviewers defended Gaga; James Montgomery believed comparing the two artists merely because of the black and white cinematography and Gaga's bowl haircut was unfounded: "[T]hat's sort of selling their vision short". Kreps thought the video's similarity to Madonna's work was because Klein had worked with her before filming "Alejandro". Kara Warner of MTV News viewed that unlike Madonna, the style of "Alejandro" is "more cutting, masculine and militant".

=== Religious iconography and themes ===
"Alejandro" created a media uproar after the release of the video because of its use of religious imagery. One of the most discussed scenes in the video was when Gaga, wearing a nun's habit, swallowed rosary beads. The Catholic League criticized the video for its use of religious imagery, accusing Gaga of "playing a Madonna copy-cat". This was echoed by Mónica Herrera, who said Gaga's use of the rosary and nun's habit to make sexual references was reminiscent of Madonna's "Like a Prayer" video. In an interview with MTV, Klein explained that this scene was Gaga's act of theophagy—"the desire to take in the holy". He said that the religious imagery was not supposed to signify anything negative, but only Gaga's "battle between the darker and lighter forces" as consolidated by Gaga's nun outfit. Klein added that the significance behind her mouth and eyes disappearing was "because she is withdrawing her senses from the world of evil and going inward towards prayer and contemplation".

Gaga dressed as a nun in a red latex habit, swallowing rosary beads. The Catholic League criticized the video's religious imagery.

Many critics agreed that the religious imagery was a calculated move by Gaga to create controversy. One of them was Simon Voxick-Levinson from Entertainment Weekly: "Gaga wants to offend people. She's a provocateur. Gaga would probably be disappointed if no one was offended by her latest video. She's doing that stuff for a reason." He found the risks unoriginal and not as exciting as the ones in "Telephone". The New York Times' Jon Caramanica viewed the controversy as Gaga's attempt to take the "Queen of Pop" title from Madonna and found the religious imagery obvious and lazy. Singer Katy Perry wrote in her Twitter account, "Using blasphemy as entertainment is as cheap as a comedian telling fart jokes." HuffPost suggested this was directed at Gaga even if she was not explicitly mentioned. Perry responded that the tweet was not only about Gaga but more about her personal views of religion. Her comments were criticized as hypocritical by BBC's Fraser McAlpine, who accused her of capitalizing on bi-curiosity with her song "I Kissed a Girl" (2008).

Critics analyzed the military look and scenes. The soldiers wore German underwear from the Interwar period and black shirts and leather jackets; for the authors Sally Gray and Anusha Rutnam, they represented "Italian fascist-inflected male sartorial aesthetics". In the Journal of LGBT Youth, Gilad Padva wrote that the military look is "queered by the explicit homoerotic photography, stylized choreography, the revealing outfits, their exposed muscles, and their sensual interactions". Padva wrote that the intimate interactions between the male dancers "(choreo)graphically challenge the hegemonic heteromasculinity and machismo", and Gaga's dominance reverses "the notorious heteronormative power relations" where she becomes "the penetrator rather than the penetrated". Literary critic Craig N. Owens wrote that some scenes of Gaga and the soldiers feature misplacement of the heart and the penis. For example, the beginning shows a muscular young man in a helmet and black briefs; he covers his crotch with a pistol. Owens thought the gun symbolizes the covered penis and indicates its displacement onto the upward-facing finial on the top of the helmet on his head. Owens believed the ending portrays organ replacement in that the top of Gaga's suit is changed into a machine gun-carrying bra. He found that this alluded to the ending scene of Gaga's "Bad Romance" video, in which she wears a pyrotechnic bra.

== Live performances ==
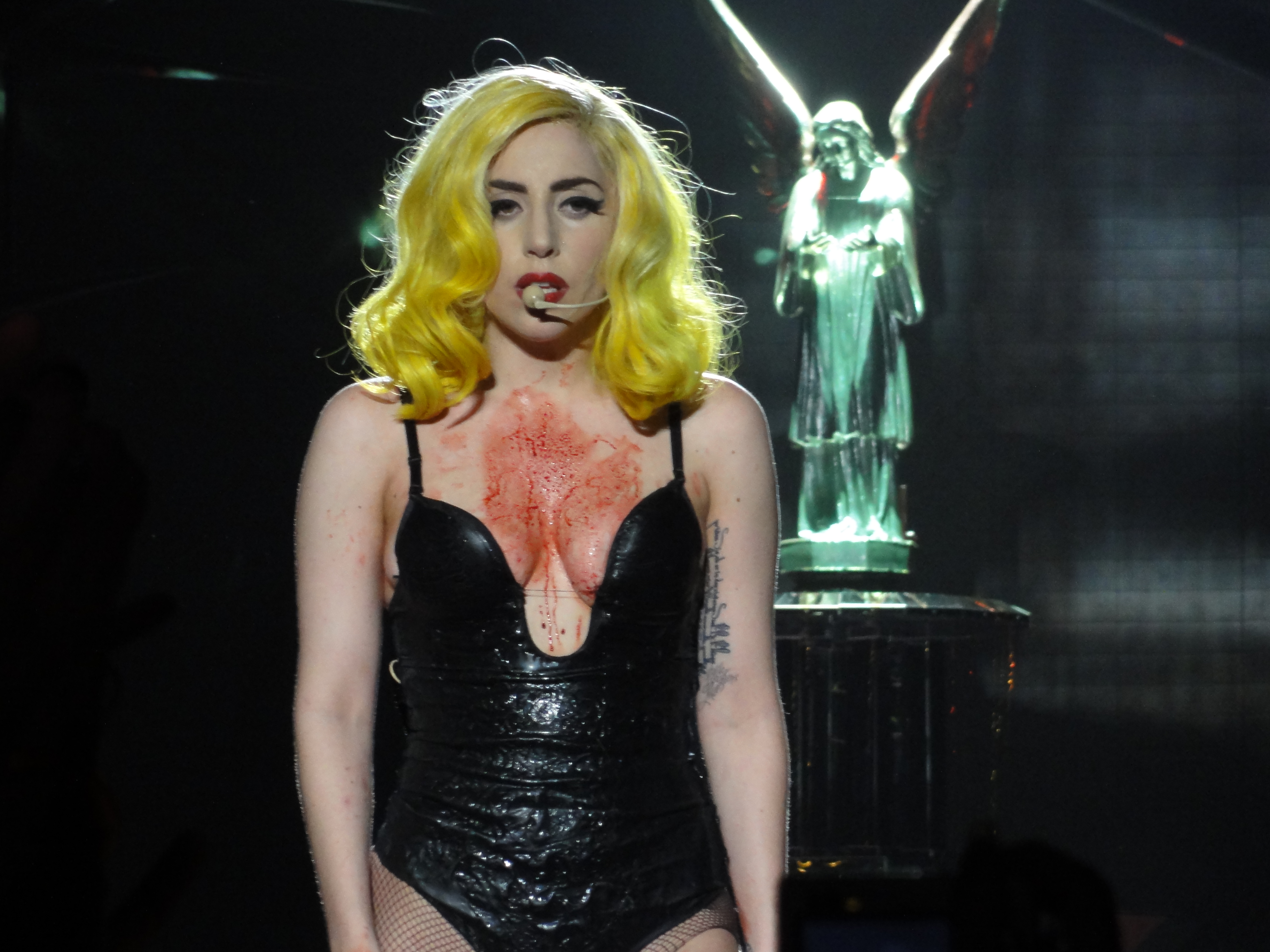
Gaga performing "Alejandro" on the revamped Monster Ball Tour (2011), which included a replica of Bethesda Fountain in New York's Central Park.

Between 2009 and 2011, Gaga performed "Alejandro" on The Monster Ball Tour. On the original version of the tour, she wore a silver bodysuit and was then carried by her crotch by one of her male dancers and lowered onto another male dancer, engaging in a threesome with them. T'Cha Dunlevy from The Gazette said that "the song followed in fast order, with not quite enough to set [it] apart. It was one choreographed dance number after the next." Jeremy Adams from Rolling Stone commented that the performance was "[one] of several moments ... that gave parents in the audience consternation". Jim Harrington from The Mercury News compared Gaga's performance with that of an erotic dancer. On the revamped show, Gaga smeared herself with fake blood during "Alejandro", as she took a bath in a fountain-like architecture on the stage, a replica of Bethesda Fountain in New York's Central Park. Katrin Horn, a postdoctoral fellow in American studies, wrote that while performing "Alejandro", Gaga approached her audiences differently. She asked them to "put your hands up for equal rights!" instead of screaming to "dance" or "put your paws up" as she usually does. In this respect, she declared her desire to support political causes.

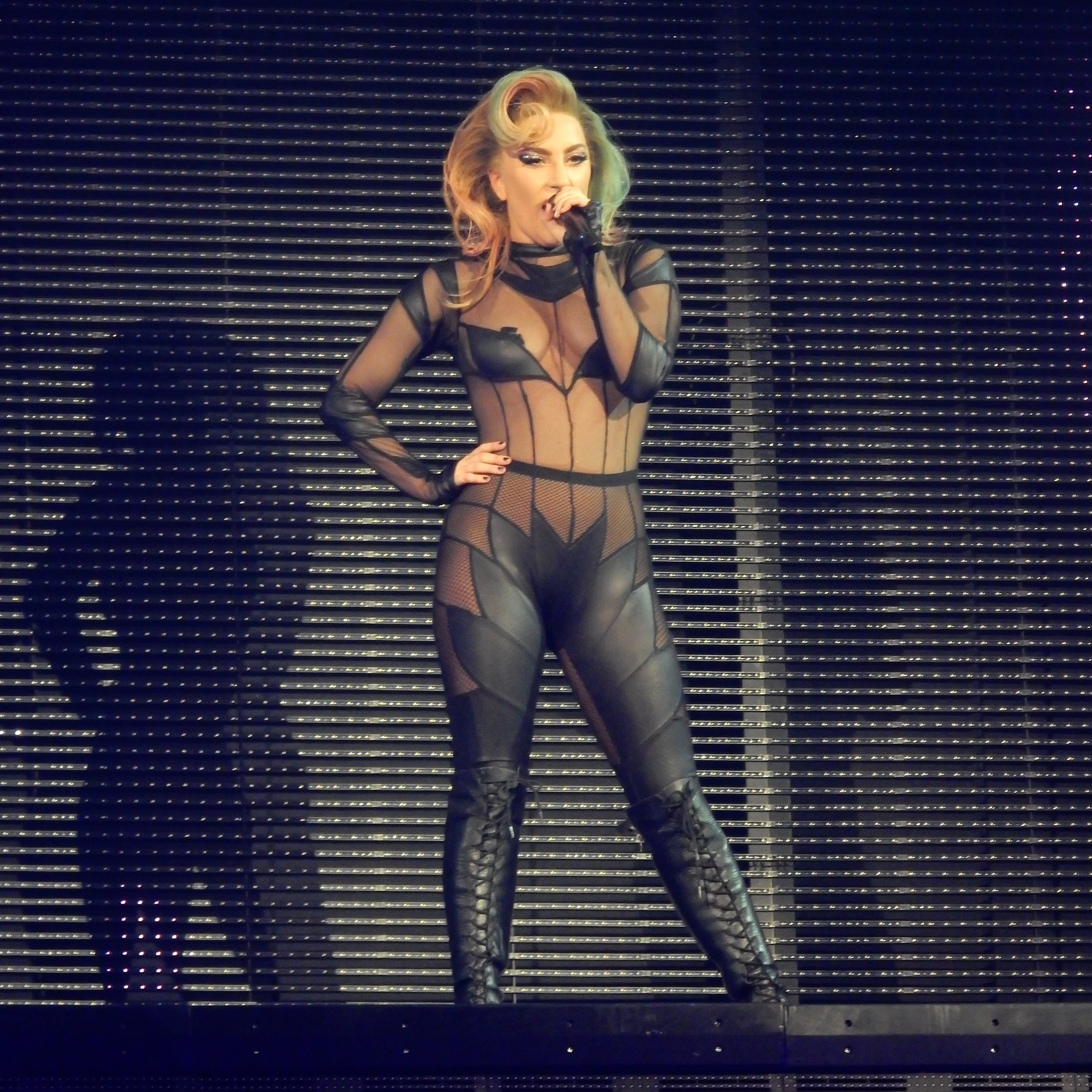
Gaga performing "Alejandro" on the Joanne World Tour in a mesh leather cut-out bodysuit (2018)

In April 2010, Gaga performed "Alejandro" at the MAC AIDS Fund Pan-Asia Viva Glam launch in Tokyo. In a performance billed as "GagaKoh", she wore a doily lace dress and entered the stage in a procession inspired by a Japanese wedding. As the lights dimmed, she sat at her piano on the rotating stage and belted out "Speechless", followed by the performance of "Alejandro" where she was picked up by one of her dancers covered in talcum powder. Gaga taped a medley of "Bad Romance" and "Alejandro" for the ninth season of American Idol in an episode aired in May 2010. She was dressed in a black outfit while surrounded by shirtless dancers. During the chorus, a statue of the Virgin Mary had flames pouring out of its top, after which fog filled the stage as Gaga and her dancers performed a dance routine. Luchina Fisher from ABC News called it a "thinly-veiled performance dripping with sex and violins" and "Gaga doing her best Madonna impression". In July 2010, Gaga sang "Alejandro" on Today on a stage outside the studio.

Gaga performed "Alejandro" at the Robin Hood Gala on May 9, 2011, to benefit the Robin Hood Foundation, and on May 15, 2011, during Radio 1's Big Weekend in Carlisle, Cumbria. On September 24, 2011, she performed it at the first iHeartRadio Music Festival, at the MGM Grand Garden Arena in Las Vegas. It was also part of the setlist to Gaga's Born This Way Ball tour (2012–2013). The performance included her lounging on a meat couch and wearing her gun bra with half-naked men dancing around her. For her 2014 tour, the ArtRave: The Artpop Ball, Gaga wore a green wig and leather hot pants for the performance of the song. She performed "Alejandro" during her shows at the 2017 Coachella Festival, wearing a red crop-top sweatshirt, and the Joanne World Tour (2017–2018), in a mesh leather cut-out bodysuit. It was later part of Gaga's setlist for her Las Vegas residency show, Enigma (2018–2020), and her 2025 promotional concerts for Mayhem, including a headlining set at Coachella 2025.

== Track listing and formats ==
Digital download

1. "Alejandro" – 4:34

The Remixes EP

1. "Alejandro" (Afrojack Remix) – 4:48
2. "Alejandro" (Rusko's Papuseria Remix) – 3:53
3. "Alejandro" (Dave Audé Remix) – 7:15
4. "Alejandro" (Skrillex Remix) – 6:17
5. "Alejandro" (Kim Fai Remix) – 7:20
6. "Alejandro" (The Sound of Arrows Remix) – 3:57
7. "Alejandro" (Bimbo Jones Remix) – 6:40
8. "Alejandro" (Kleerup Remix) – 5:22

French CD single and iTunes EP

1. "Alejandro" (radio edit) – 3:58
2. "Alejandro" (Dave Audé Radio Remix) – 3:51
3. "Alejandro" (Bimbo Jones Radio Edit Remix) – 3:19

UK CD single

1. "Alejandro" – 4:34
2. "Alejandro" (Dave Audé Remix) – 7:15

UK 7-inch vinyl

1. "Alejandro" – 4:34
2. "Alejandro" (Bimbo Jones Remix) – 6:40

UK iTunes bundle

1. "Alejandro" – 4:34
2. "Alejandro" (music video) – 8:44

== Credits and personnel ==
Credits are adapted from the liner notes of The Fame Monster.

- Lady Gaga – vocals, songwriter, co-producer, vocal arrangement, background vocals
- Nadir "RedOne" Khayat – songwriter, producer, vocal editing, vocal arrangement, background vocals, audio engineering, instrumentation, programming, recording at FC Walvisch, Amsterdam
- Eelco Bakker – audio engineering
- Johnny Severin – vocal editing
- Robert Orton – audio mixing at Sarm Studios, London, England
- Gene Grimaldi – audio mastering at Oasis Mastering, Burbank, California

== Charts ==
=== Weekly charts ===
Weekly chart performance
| Chart (2010–2012) | Peak position |
|---|---|
| Australia (ARIA) | 2 |
| Austria (Ö3 Austria Top 40) | 2 |
| Belgium (Ultratop 50 Flanders) | 4 |
| Belgium (Ultratop 50 Wallonia) | 3 |
| Brazil (Crowley Broadcast Analysis) | 5 |
| Bulgaria (BAMP) | 1 |
| Canada Hot 100 (Billboard) | 4 |
| Canada AC (Billboard) | 2 |
| Canada CHR/Top 40 (Billboard) | 4 |
| Canada Hot AC (Billboard) | 2 |
| CIS Airplay (TopHit) | 1 |
| Croatia International Airplay (HRT) | 1 |
| Czech Republic Airplay (ČNS IFPI) | 1 |
| Denmark (Tracklisten) | 4 |
| Europe (European Hot 100 Singles) | 2 |
| Finland (Suomen virallinen lista) | 1 |
| France (SNEP) | 3 |
| Germany (GfK) | 2 |
| Greece Digital Song Sales (Billboard) | 1 |
| Hungary (Dance Top 40) | 3 |
| Hungary (Rádiós Top 40) | 1 |
| Hungary (Single Top 40) | 5 |
| Ireland (IRMA) | 3 |
| Italy (FIMI) | 2 |
| Italy Airplay (EarOne) | 2 |
| Luxembourg Digital Song Sales (Billboard) | 2 |
| Mexico Anglo (Monitor Latino) | 1 |
| Netherlands (Dutch Top 40) | 4 |
| Netherlands (Single Top 100) | 7 |
| New Zealand (Recorded Music NZ) | 11 |
| Norway (VG-lista) | 3 |
| Poland Airplay (ZPAV) | 1 |
| Portugal Digital Song Sales (Billboard) | 1 |
| Romania (Romanian Top 100) | 1 |
| Romania Airplay (Media Forest) | 1 |
| Romania TV Airplay (Media Forest) | 1 |
| Russia Airplay (TopHit) | 1 |
| Scottish Singles Sales (Official Charts) | 8 |
| Slovakia Airplay (ČNS IFPI) | 2 |
| South Korea International Singles (Gaon) | 64 |
| Spain (Promusicae) | 3 |
| Sweden (Sverigetopplistan) | 3 |
| Switzerland (Schweizer Hitparade) | 3 |
| Ukraine Airplay (TopHit) | 4 |
| UK Singles (Official Charts) | 7 |
| US Billboard Hot 100 | 5 |
| US Adult Contemporary (Billboard) | 13 |
| US Adult Pop Airplay (Billboard) | 13 |
| US Dance Club Songs (Billboard) | 1 |
| US Hot Latin Songs (Billboard) | 34 |
| US Pop Airplay (Billboard) | 4 |
| US Rhythmic Airplay (Billboard) | 11 |
| Venezuela Pop Rock (Record Report) | 1 |

Weekly chart performance
| Chart (2013) | Peak position |
|---|---|
| Ukraine Airplay (TopHit) | 111 |

Weekly chart performance
| Chart (2015) | Peak position |
|---|---|
| Ukraine Airplay (TopHit) | 154 |

Weekly chart performance
| Chart (2016) | Peak position |
|---|---|
| Ukraine Airplay (TopHit) | 127 |

Weekly chart performance
| Chart (2017) | Peak position |
|---|---|
| Ukraine Airplay (TopHit) | 182 |

Weekly chart performance
| Chart (2019) | Peak position |
|---|---|
| Ukraine Airplay (TopHit) | 200 |

Weekly chart performance
| Chart (2021) | Peak position |
|---|---|
| Finland Airplay (Radiosoittolista) | 76 |

Weekly chart performance
| Chart (2022) | Peak position |
|---|---|
| CIS Airplay (TopHit) | 190 |

Weekly chart performance
| Chart (2023) | Peak position |
|---|---|
| CIS Airplay (TopHit) | 176 |
| Poland (Polish Airplay Top 100) | 54 |
| Romania Airplay (TopHit) | 123 |

Weekly chart performance
| Chart (2024–2026) | Peak position |
|---|---|
| Brazil Hot 100 (Billboard) | 74 |
| Finland Airplay (Radiosoittolista) | 87 |
| Poland (Polish Airplay Top 100) | 50 |
| Romania Airplay (TopHit) | 85 |

=== Monthly charts ===
Monthly chart performance
| Chart (2010) | Position |
|---|---|
| Brazil (Brasil Hot 100 Airplay) | 4 |
| Brazil (Brasil Hot Pop Songs) | 1 |
| CIS Airplay (TopHit) | 2 |
| Russia Airplay (TopHit) | 1 |
| Ukraine Airplay (TopHit) | 6 |

Monthly chart performance
| Chart (2011) | Position |
|---|---|
| CIS Airplay (TopHit) | 78 |
| Russia Airplay (TopHit) | 75 |

Monthly chart performance
| Chart (2024) | Peak position |
|---|---|
| Romania Airplay (TopHit) | 96 |

=== Year-end charts ===
Year-end chart performance
| Chart (2010) | Position |
|---|---|
| Australia (ARIA) | 50 |
| Australia (ARIA Dance) | 10 |
| Austria (Ö3 Austria Top 40) | 10 |
| Belgium (Ultratop Flanders) | 17 |
| Belgium (Ultratop Wallonia) | 15 |
| Canada (Canadian Hot 100) | 14 |
| CIS Airplay (TopHit) | 6 |
| Croatia International Airplay (HRT) | 2 |
| Denmark (Tracklisten) | 19 |
| Europe (European Hot 100 Singles) | 16 |
| France (SNEP) | 31 |
| Germany (Official German Charts) | 19 |
| Hungary (Dance Top 40) | 12 |
| Hungary (Rádiós Top 40) | 6 |
| Italy (FIMI) | 4 |
| Italy Airplay (EarOne) | 20 |
| Netherlands (Dutch Top 40) | 19 |
| Netherlands (Single Top 100) | 21 |
| Romania (Romanian Top 100) | 2 |
| Russia Airplay (TopHit) | 6 |
| Spain (PROMUSICAE) | 8 |
| Sweden (Sverigetopplistan) | 18 |
| Switzerland (Schweizer Hitparade) | 8 |
| Ukraine Airplay (TopHit) | 12 |
| UK Singles (Official Charts) | 46 |
| US Billboard Hot 100 | 33 |
| US Adult Contemporary (Billboard) | 30 |
| US Adult Pop Airplay (Billboard) | 43 |
| US Dance Club Songs (Billboard) | 21 |
| US Pop Airplay (Billboard) | 25 |
| US Radio Songs (Billboard) | 30 |

Year-end chart performance
| Chart (2011) | Position |
|---|---|
| CIS Airplay (TopHit) | 102 |
| Hungary (Dance Top 40) | 91 |
| Hungary (Rádiós Top 40) | 93 |
| Russia Airplay (TopHit) | 100 |
| Ukraine Airplay (TopHit) | 150 |

Year-end chart performance
| Chart (2023) | Position |
|---|---|
| Hungary (Rádiós Top 40) | 71 |

Year-end chart performance
| Chart (2024) | Position |
|---|---|
| Hungary (Rádiós Top 40) | 82 |

== Certifications and sales ==
Certifications and sales
| Region | Certification | Certified units/sales |
|---|---|---|
| Australia (ARIA) | 4× Platinum | 280,000^{‡} |
| Austria (IFPI Austria) | Platinum | 30,000^{*} |
| Belgium (BRMA) | Platinum | 30,000^{*} |
| Brazil (Pro-Música Brasil) | Diamond | 250,000^{‡} |
| Denmark (IFPI Danmark) | Platinum | 30,000^{^} |
| France (SNEP) | Gold | 150,000^{*} |
| Germany (BVMI) | Platinum | 300,000^{^} |
| Italy (FIMI) | 2× Platinum | 60,000^{*} |
| New Zealand (RMNZ) | Platinum | 30,000^{‡} |
| Norway (IFPI Norway) | Platinum | 60,000^{‡} |
| Russia (NFPF) Ringtone | 4× Platinum | 800,000^{*} |
| Spain (Promusicae) | Platinum | 40,000^{*} |
| Spain (Promusicae) Since 2015 | Gold | 30,000^{‡} |
| Sweden (GLF) | Platinum | 40,000^{‡} |
| Switzerland (IFPI Switzerland) | Platinum | 30,000^{^} |
| United Kingdom (BPI) | Platinum | 600,000^{‡} |
| United States (RIAA) | 4× Platinum | 4,000,000^{‡} |
^{*} Sales figures based on certification alone.^{^} Shipments figures based on certification alone.^{‡} Sales+streaming figures based on certification alone.

== Release history ==
Release dates and formats
| Region | Date | Format(s) | Version | Label | Ref. |
|---|---|---|---|---|---|
| Belgium | November 9, 2009 (Note: Released as a promotional single.) | Digital download | Original | Interscope | |
| France | November 9, 2009 | Digital download | Original | Interscope | |
| Sweden | November 9, 2009 | Digital download | Original | Interscope | |
| United States | April 20, 2010 | Contemporary hit radio; rhythmic contemporary radio | Original | Interscope | |
| Europe | May 10, 2010 | Digital download | Remixes | Interscope | |
| Canada | May 18, 2010 | Digital download | Remixes | Interscope | |
| United States | May 18, 2010 | Digital download | Remixes | Interscope | |
| France | June 8, 2010 | Radio airplay | Original | Universal | |
| United States | June 15, 2010 | CD | Remixes | Interscope | |
| France | June 21, 2010 | CD; MCD | Original | Interscope | |
| Italy | June 25, 2010 | Radio airplay | Original | Universal | |
| United Kingdom | June 28, 2010 | 7-inch; CD; MCD | Original | Polydor | |
| Germany | July 2, 2010 | CD | Original | Interscope | |

== See also ==
- List of Billboard Hot 100 top-ten singles in 2010
- List of German airplay number-one songs
- List of number-one songs of the 2010s (Czech Republic)
- List of number-one singles of 2010 (Finland)
- List of number-one singles of the 2010s (Hungary)
- List of number-one singles of 2010 (Poland)
- List of Romanian Top 100 number ones of the 2010s
- List of number-one dance singles of 2010 (U.S.)

== Literary sources ==
- Burns, Lori; Woods, Alyssa; Lafrance, Marc (March 2015). "The Genealogy of a Song: Lady Gaga's Musical Intertexts on The Fame Monster (2009)". Twentieth-Century Music. 12 (1). Cambridge University Press: 3–35. doi:10.1017/S1478572214000176. S2CID 194128676.
- Deflem, Mathieu (2017). "Art Pop: The Styles of Lady Gaga". Lady Gaga and the Sociology of Fame: the Rise of a Pop Star in an Age of Celebrity. Palgrave Macmillan. pp. 189–210. ISBN 978-1-137-58468-7.
- Horn, Katrin (2017). "Taking Pop Seriously: Lady Gaga as Camp". Women, Camp, and Popular Culture: Serious Excess. Palgrave Macmillan. pp. 193–252. ISBN 978-3-319-64845-3.
- Jakubowski, Kelly; Finkel, Sebastian; Stewart, Lauren; Müllensiefen, Daniel (May 2017). "Dissecting an Earworm: Melodic Features and Song Popularity Predict Involuntary Musical Imagery" (PDF). Psychology of Aesthetics, Creativity, and the Arts. 11 (2). American Psychological Association: 122–135. doi:10.1037/aca0000090. Archived (PDF) from the original on October 4, 2022.
- Iddon, Martin; Marshall, Melanie L., eds. (2014). Lady Gaga and Popular Music: Performing Gender, Fashion, and Culture. Routledge Studies in Popular Music. Routledge. ISBN 978-1-134-07987-2.
  - Gray, Sally; Rutnam, Anusha (2014). "Her Own Real Thing: Lady Gaga and the House of Fashion". Lady Gaga and Popular Music : Performing Gender, Fashion, and Culture. Routledge. pp. 43–66. ISBN 978-1-134-07987-2.
  - Owens, Craig N. (2014). "Celebrity without Organs". Lady Gaga and Popular Music : Performing Gender, Fashion, and Culture. Routledge. pp. 94–116. ISBN 978-1-134-07987-2.
- Kustritz, Anne (2012). "MP3s, rebundled debt, and performative economics – Deferral, derivatives, and digital commodity fetishism in Lady Gaga's spectacle of excess". NECSUS European Journal of Media Studies. 2 (23–54). Amsterdam University Press: 35–54. doi:10.5117/NECSUS2012.2.KUST.
- Padva, Gilad (January 2, 2018). "Queer Nostalgia in Cinema and Pop Culture". Journal of LGBT Youth. 15 (1). Palgrave Macmillan: 173–199. doi:10.1057/9781137266347. ISBN 978-1-137-26633-0.
- Walden, Joshua S. (2014). "Conclusion". Sounding authentic: the rural miniature and musical modernism. Oxford University Press. pp. 203–210. ISBN 978-0-199-33467-4.
