= List of number-one dance singles of 2010 (Poland) =

This is a list of the number-one singles on the Polish Top – Dyskoteki chart in 2010, ranking the most-played songs in nightclubs across Poland. It was compiled by DJ Promotion and published by the Polish Society of the Phonographic Industry (ZPAV). It launched in April 2010 and was published biweekly, with the exception of period May–July when it was published only once a month.

== List of number ones ==
| Issue date | Song | Artist(s) | Source |
|---|---|---|---|
| 1 April | "Sexy Bitch" | David Guetta featuring Akon | |
| 16 April | "Memories" | David Guetta featuring Kid Cudi | |
| 1 May | "Memories" | David Guetta featuring Kid Cudi | |
| 1 June | "Memories" | David Guetta featuring Kid Cudi | |
| 1 July | "Alors on danse" | Stromae | |
| 1 August | "We No Speak Americano" | Yolanda Be Cool featuring DCUP | |
| 16 August | "We No Speak Americano" | Yolanda Be Cool featuring DCUP | |
| 1 September | "We No Speak Americano" | Yolanda Be Cool featuring DCUP | |
| 16 September | "We No Speak Americano" | Yolanda Be Cool featuring DCUP | |
| 1 October | "We No Speak Americano" | Yolanda Be Cool featuring DCUP | |
| 16 October | "We No Speak Americano" | Yolanda Be Cool featuring DCUP | |
| 1 November | "We No Speak Americano" | Yolanda Be Cool featuring DCUP | |
| 16 November | "We No Speak Americano" | Yolanda Be Cool featuring DCUP | |
| 1 December | "Loca" | Shakira featuring Dizzee Rascal | |
| 16 December | "Only Girl (In the World)" | Rihanna | |

== See also ==
- List of number-one singles of 2010 (Poland)
- List of number-one albums of 2010 (Poland)
