= Only Girl (In the World) =

2010 single by Rihanna

Single by Rihanna

from the album Loud
- Released: September 10, 2010
- Recorded: 2010
- Studio: Roc the Mic (New York City); Westlake (Los Angeles); The Bunker (Paris)
- Genre: Dance-pop; Eurodance; Euro hop; Electro hop; R&B
- Length: 3:55
- Label: Def Jam; SRP
- Songwriters: Crystal Johnson; Mikkel S. Eriksen; Tor Erik Hermansen; Sandy Wilhelm
- Producers: StarGate; Sandy Vee; Kuk Harrell

Rihanna singles chronology
"Love the Way You Lie" (2010)	"Only Girl (In the World)" (2010)	"What's My Name?" (2010)

Music video
- "Only Girl (In the World)" on YouTube

"Only Girl (In the World)" is a song by Barbadian singer Rihanna from her fifth studio album, Loud (2010). It was released as the album's lead single on September 10, 2010, by Def Jam Recordings. Crystal Johnson wrote the song in collaboration with its producers Stargate (Mikkel S. Eriksen and Tor Erik Hermansen) and Sandy Vee. Rihanna contacted Stargate before Loud's production and asked the duo to create lively, upbeat music. "Only Girl (In the World)" was the first song composed for the album and Rihanna decided to include it on the track list before she recorded her vocals. Backed by a strong bassline and synthesizers, the song is a dance-pop, Eurodance and "rave" R&B track that has an electronic composition. Its lyrics describe the singer demanding attention from her lover.

Upon its release, "Only Girl (In the World)" received favorable reviews from music critics, who praised the song's composition and Rihanna's decision to move away from the dark themes of her fourth studio album, Rated R (2009). The song won the Grammy Award for Best Dance Recording at the 53rd Annual Grammy Awards. Commercially, "Only Girl (In the World)" was an international success, topping the record charts in Australia, Austria, Canada, Ireland and New Zealand, and peaking within the top five of the charts in France, Germany and Switzerland. It spent two weeks at number one on the UK Singles Chart and is the 19th-bestselling single of all time by a female artist, with over one million units sold. In the United States, "Only Girl (In the World)" topped the Billboard Hot 100 chart two weeks after Loud's second single, "What's My Name?", reached number one. It was the first time in the history of Billboard magazine that an album's lead single reached number one after its second single. "Only Girl (In the World)" has over two billion streams on Spotify.

The accompanying music video for "Only Girl (In the World)" was directed by Anthony Mandler and depicts Rihanna alone in an open natural landscape, suggesting that she is the only female in the world, echoing the song's title and lyrics. The music video was praised by critics for its bright, colorful theme. Rihanna performed the song on Saturday Night Live, The X Factor and a shortened version at the 31st Brit Awards. The singer also performed "Only Girl (In the World)" at the Super Bowl LVII halftime show in a medley with her 2012 single "Where Have You Been".

== Background and release ==
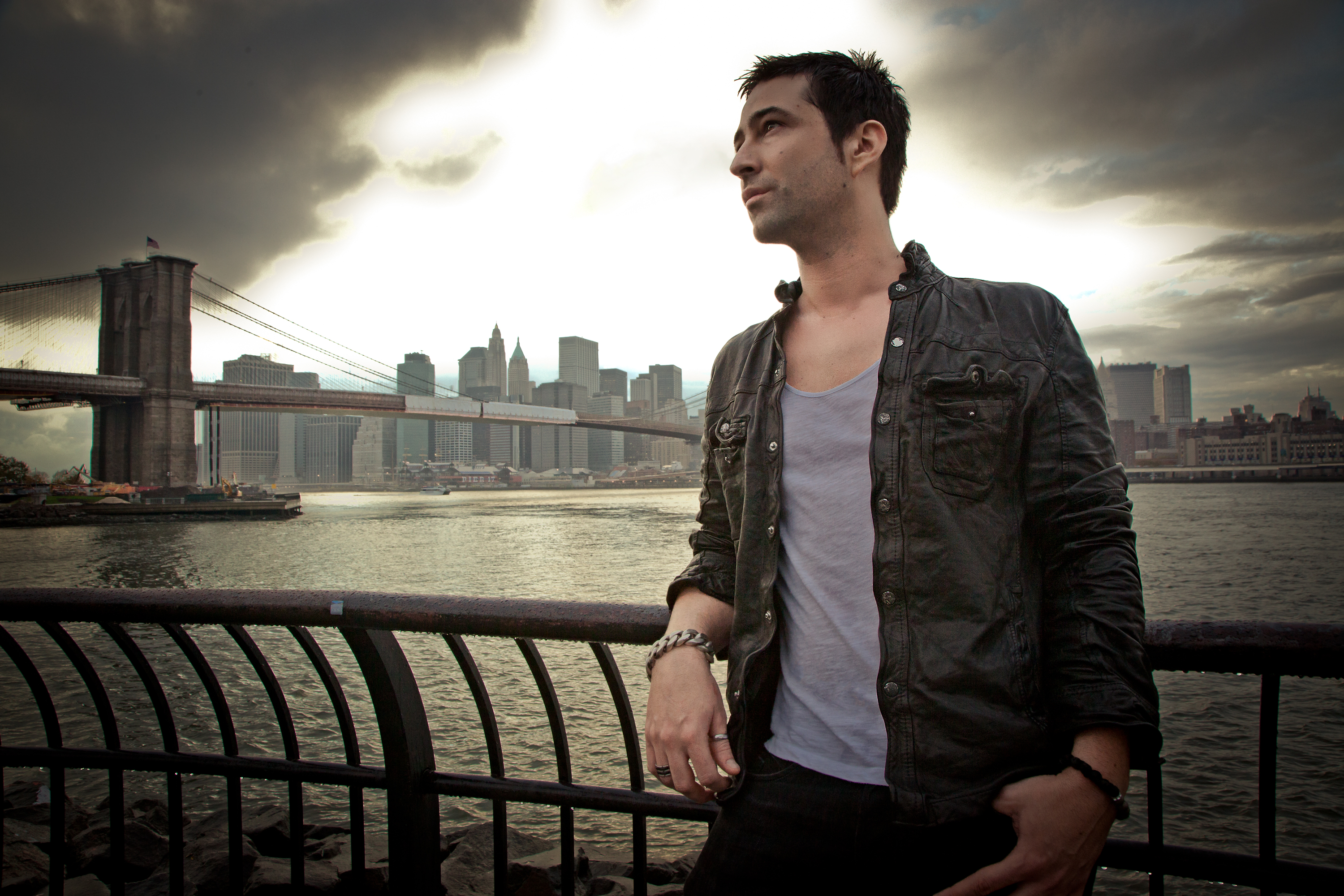
Sandy Vee (pictured) co-wrote and produced "Only Girl (In the World)".

"Only Girl (In the World)" was written by Crystal Johnson with the song's producers, Stargate and Sandy Vee. Rihanna had previously worked with Stargate on the singles "Hate That I Love You", "Don't Stop the Music" and "Rude Boy". In February 2011, Stargate said that Rihanna approached the Norwegian production duo before she began recording the then-untitled project, saying that she wanted to have fun and produce happy, uptempo songs. According to Tor Erik Hermansen of Stargate, "Only Girl (In the World)" was the first song created for Loud and Rihanna decided to include it on the album before recording her vocals. Furthermore, American singer Katy Perry expressed interest in recording "Only Girl (In the World)", but the song was specifically composed by Stargate for Rihanna. In a webchat with fans, Rihanna said that she wanted to take the next step as an artist: "I didn't want to go backward and remake Good Girl Gone Bad. I wanted the next step in the evolution of Rihanna, and it's perfect for us. You guys are always defending me, so now you've got some great songs to justify it." The singer described "Only Girl (In the World)" as having a "bigger sound" than "Rude Boy".

In preparation for recording "Only Girl (In the World)", Rihanna took a few days to mentally prepare and rest her voice. Johnson recorded a demo of the song and sent it to Rihanna before she officially recorded it. All the elements, including the giggles and ad-libs in the first line of lyrics, were pre-planned and executed beforehand. The instrumental of "Only Girl (In the World)" was recorded by Mikkel Storleer Eriksen of Stargate and Miles Walker at Roc the Mic Studios in New York City and Westlake Recording Studios in Los Angeles, and by Vee at the Bunker in Paris. Kuk Harrell produced Rihanna's vocals, recording them with Josh Gudwin and Marcos Tovar. Inaam Haq, Dane Liska and Brad Shea recorded additional vocals. The song was mixed by Phil Tan at the Ninja Beat Club in Atlanta and by Vee at The Bunker, with engineering by Damien Lewis. Eriksen, Vee and Hermansen provided the instrumentation, and Johnson sang background vocals. The cover of "Only Girl (In the World)" maintains the semi-nude aesthetic seen in Rated R but introduces a red color scheme, serving as a bridge between the two themes. In the image, Rihanna is depicted kneeling in a field, holding a red dress to preserve modesty. Adorned with a necklace and sporting a bandage on her arm, the singer's hip tattoo is prominently visible. The 'R' symbol is situated in the upper left corner of the album cover, with the song title placed in the bottom middle.

On August 31, 2010, Rihanna posted an announcement on Twitter, tagging Ryan Seacrest's username, that she would release a special song that everyone could listen to repeatedly just like the only girl in this world in less than 10 days. A few days later, the singer announced that she would premiere "Only Girl (In the World)" on the On Air with Ryan Seacrest website on September 7 at 3 a.m. PT. The song officially became available as a digital download single on September 10 and 13 in various countries worldwide. On September 21, 2010, Rihanna sent "Only Girl (In the World)" to contemporary hit and rhythmic contemporary radio stations in the United States.

== Composition ==
"Only Girl (In the World)" is a dance-pop, Eurodance and "rave" R&B song. The sheet music for the song shows two to three sharps in common time with a suggested tempo of "moderately fast." Its instrumentation includes synthesizers, a "heavy whipping bass" and a "strobing" electro beat. Brad Wete of Entertainment Weekly described the song as a "stronger, sexier" version of her 2007 single, "Don't Stop the Music".

Rihanna's voice spans one-and-a-half octaves in "Only Girl (In the World)", from F♯_{3} to C♯_{5}, and her vocal has a "silky", "seductive" tone. In the song's lyrics Rihanna yearns for her lover's attention, which makes her feel like the only girl in the world. The singer "pours her heart out" in the chorus: "Want you to make me feel like I'm the only girl in the world/ Like I'm the only one that you'll ever love/ Like I'm the only one who knows your heart/ Only girl in the world." According to Digital Spy writer Nick Levine, the chorus "thumps like a rabbit having an epileptic fit." Rihanna sings suggestively, "Baby, I'll tell you all my secrets that I'm keepin'/ You can come inside/ And when you enter, you ain't leavin'/ Be my prisoner for the night." Fraser McAlpine of the BBC compared the song's message to that of the German fairy tale "Rapunzel"; Rihanna is not willing to throw her hair out of the castle for just any man to come and satisfy her, "particularly not someone who isn't prepared to make the climb up to her scarily high window."

== Critical reception ==
The song received a generally positive response from music critics. Chloe Govan remarked that "Only Girl (In the World)" symbolizes Rihanna's newfound and bold personality, reflecting not only a shift in style but also in sound. Gerrick D. Kennedy of the Los Angeles Times called the track a "surefire hit" and something of a "comeback". MTV News writer James Dinh praised the uptempo song, comparing it to the "stark" lead single "Russian Roulette" from Rihanna's previous Rated R. Monica Herrera wrote for Billboard that "Only Girl (In the World)" "aims squarely for dance-floor domination." Nick Levine of Digital Spy gave the song four stars out of five, calling it a "crowd-pleaser" but not overly original.

According to Levine and Jim Farber of the New York Daily News, "Only Girl (In the World)" was Rihanna's most pop-sounding song since "Don't Stop the Music". Analyzing the song, the BBC's Fraser McAlpine questioned why "Only Girl (In the World)" leaves a "positive impression" on the listener despite its arrogant, domineering tone. Critical at first ("Listen to the pneumatic hiss at the heart of this song. Try and endure the pumping thrust without getting winded. There is simply too much pressure being stuffed into our ears, with too much brutal force"), he concluded that Rihanna sings the song with great passion and gave it four stars out of five. James Dolan gave the song two-and-a-half stars out of five in Rolling Stone, writing that "the trance beat won't keep you in the club unless someone else is paying for the drinks."

== Chart performance ==
=== North America ===
In the United States, "Only Girl (In the World)" debuted at number 75 on the Billboard Hot 100 on September 25, 2010, jumping to number three the following week, before peaking at number one (Rihanna's ninth) on November 25. Loud's second single, "What's My Name?" (featuring Drake), topped the Hot 100 two weeks before; it was the first time in chart history that an album's first single reached number one after its second. "Only Girl (In the World)" was Rihanna's fourth number-one song of 2010, and she was the first female and the first artist since Usher (in 2004) with four number-one singles in a calendar year. The singer also had the most number-one singles (nine) since 2000. "Only Girl (In the World)" appeared on the Billboard Hot 100 year-end chart in 2010 and 2011 at numbers 47 and 40, respectively.

The song debuted on the Digital Songs chart at number one with sales of 249,000, Rihanna's eighth number-one single and her sixth to debut atop the chart (the most in both categories by any artist since the chart's 2005 introduction). The singer set a Mainstream Top 40 (Pop Songs) radio-airplay chart record when "Only Girl (In the World)" rose from number two to number one on November 25, 2010, her seventh number-one. The song was number 46 and number 33, respectively, on the 2011 Billboard Digital Songs and Pop Songs year-end charts. "Only Girl (In the World)" was Rihanna's twelfth number-one on the Dance Club Songs songs chart and number 46 on the 2010 Billboard year-end chart. The song has been certified six times platinum by the Recording Industry Association of America (RIAA), and has sold 3.6 million copies in the US as of June 2015. In Canada, "Only Girl (In the World)" debuted at number 65 on September 25, 2010, and rose to number one for a week the following week. On November 6 the song returned to number one for three consecutive weeks, remaining on the chart for a total of 35 weeks.

=== United Kingdom ===
In the United Kingdom "Only Girl (In the World)" debuted at number two on the UK Singles Chart on October 31, 2010, with 126,000 copies sold. Cheryl Cole debuted at number one with "Promise This", selling 157,000 copies, and Cole and Rihanna had the highest and second-highest debut sales figures of the year. The song rose to number one the next week for two consecutive weeks. It was Rihanna's fourth UK number-one single, following "Umbrella" (2007), "Take a Bow" (2008) and "Run This Town" (2009). By December 2011 "Only Girl (In the World)" was the 108th song to sell more than a million copies in the United Kingdom, the fifteenth by a female artist, Rihanna's first as primary artist and second overall; the 107th million-seller was Eminem's "Love the Way You Lie" six weeks before, on which Rihanna was featured.

Rihanna was the second non-United Kingdom, non-North American million-selling artist; the first was Danish singer Whigfield with her 1994 song, "Saturday Night". Although at the time the only other female two-song million-seller was Canadian singer Celine Dion, two of Rihanna's subsequent singles—"We Found Love" (2011) and "Diamonds" (2012)—have also sold more than a million copies each. "Only Girl (In the World)" is the nineteenth-bestselling single by a female artist and the 99th overall of all time in the United Kingdom. The song was the fourth- and 68th-bestselling single, respectively, of 2010 and 2011. Certified platinum by the British Phonographic Industry (BPI) for shipments exceeding 600,000 copies, it has sold 1,080,000 copies. "Only Girl (In the World)" peaked at number one on the UK Single Downloads Chart and the Scottish Singles Chart.

=== Elsewhere ===
Internationally, and particularly in Europe, the song had widespread acclaim and achieved massive success, topping several charts and reaching top ten-hits on music markets. Thus, "Only Girl (In the World)" debuted at number 22 on Wallonian Ultratop 50. Three weeks later, the song peaked at number one, becoming Rihanna's third chart-topper in the Wallonian region in Belgium. "Only Girl (In The World)" will spend 25 weeks. In the Flemish region, the song failed to top the charts but peaked at number 2, blocked by "Barbra Streisand" by Duck Sauce. There, the song will spend 21 weeks. The song also topped the Austrian Ö3 Austria Top 40, which it debuted at number 12 in mid-October 2010 and peaked the summit end of the month, becoming Rihanna's fourth number one after "Umbrella" (2007), "Don't Stop the Music" (2007) and "Love The Way You Lie" with Eminem (2010). In Norway, "Only Girl (In The World)" debuted with success at number one immediately, becoming Rihanna's first number one debut in the country and fourth number one overall after "Umbrella" (2007), "Russian Roulette" (2009) and "Love The Way You Lie" (2010). The song spent 22 weeks in total in the Norwegian Singles Chart. The song topped the Italian Singles Chart, the Croatian Singles Charts and the Polish Singles Chart. "Only Girl (In the World)" peaked at number 2 in Germany, Finland, Netherlands, Sweden and Spain.

In France, the song debuted immediately at second position due to strong digital sales, blocked by "Mignon Mais Gros" by "René La Taupe". It spent 5 weeks at number 2. "Only Girl" will spend 13 weeks in top ten and 72 weeks overall in the French Singles Chart from 2010 to 2024, due to many re-entries. The longest-running charting song by Rihanna in the country, it will be later surpassed by "Man Down" (2010), from the same album, which stayed 73 weeks in total on the Singles Chart, then "We Found Love" (2011), who would spend 111 weeks, which would be surpassed by "Diamonds" (2012), two years later.

== Music video ==
In a scene from the video Rihanna, wearing a large white shawl, is standing on a mountain trail surrounded by large balloons in assorted colors. The video was praised by critics for its simplicity and colorful, pleasant imagery.

Director Anthony Mandler filmed the music video for "Only Girl (In the World)" at a location two hours from Los Angeles in August 2010. Prior to shooting the music video, Rihanna proactively shared photos and reference videos with several directors, aspiring to materialize the specific concept she envisioned. However, the scripts developed by most directors seemed inauthentic and failed to resonate with the singer. Eventually, Rihanna found Anthony Mandler's approach to be the most fitting. Mandler curated a selection of diverse photos, ranging from the most recent to those dating back nine years, which he sent to Rihanna for her approval. Rihanna told JustJared.com that the video was filmed in a "big landscape" so she was the only person in the frame, echoing the song's title. While filming, the Barbadian singer faced challenges due to the presence of numerous insects and snakes at the location. Despite these difficulties, she maintained a positive outlook, believing that the end result would be stunning and worth the effort. The singer is also "frolicking in a red field and lying in a bed of flowers." The video features large balloons in different colours, a swing hanging from the sky and a tree with multi-colored lights. Rihanna's outfits include a mohair sweater, a floral miniskirt and a white-bra-and-boyshorts two-piece.

Entertainment Weekly writer Tanner Stransky praised the video's simplicity, noting that it seems "as if Rihanna is speaking directly to you, the viewer, and she is your one and only amid swallowing rolling, beautiful, swallowing landscapes. It's an effect that makes you focus squarely on [Rihanna], who's ensconced in flirty outfits." According to Joyce Lee of CBS, Rihanna appeared to have progressed from the "edgy" music videos of the Rated R singles to a more feminine, colourful tone. Seth Sommerfield of Spin echoed Lee's comments, calling it "whimsical [and] beautiful". Billboard reviewer Jason Lipshutz described the tree with flashing lights as "surreal imagery."

== Usage in media ==
The song has appeared on the videogames Just Dance 3 (Note: Exclusive to copies sold by Target/Zellers.) and Grand Theft Auto V. The song was also featured in the 2015 DreamWorks Animation movie Home.

== Live performances and covers ==
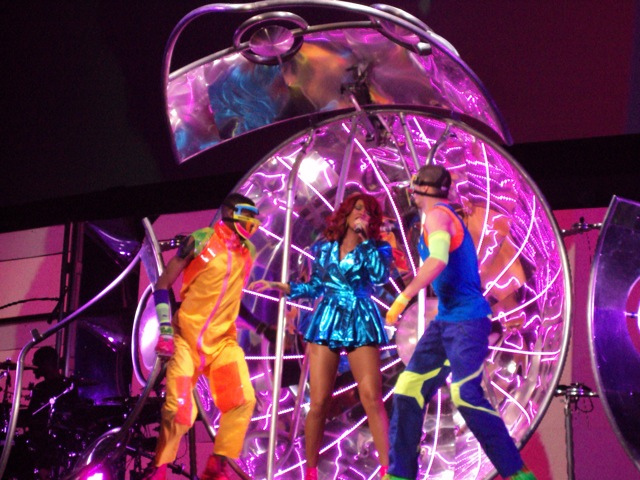
Rihanna performing "Only Girl (In the World)" on the Loud Tour (2011)

Rihanna performed "Only Girl (In the World)" and a solo version of "What's My Name?" on Saturday Night Live in New York City on October 30, 2010. The next day, she flew to London to perform the song on The X Factor. On November 7 she performed the song at the MTV Europe Music Awards in Madrid. Two days later, Rihanna sang "Only Girl (In the World)" on the Italian version of The X Factor in a floral-print bikini, boots and a red pigtail. The next day she flew to France to sing the song on Le Grand Journal, on a set covered with white balloons.

The singer returned to London on November 11 to record an interview for The Graham Norton Show, which included a live performance of "Only Girl (In the World)". Rihanna opened the American Music Awards with a medley of songs from Loud. She began with an a cappella version of "Love the Way You Lie (Part II)", sitting on a stylized tree of lights above "a field of sable-colored blades of grass." Rihanna then sang a solo version of "What's My Name?" and a short version of "Only Girl (In the World)". According to Mawuse Ziegbe of MTV News, the singer "kicked up the island theme" as drummers in tribal dress circled her.

Rihanna performed a short version of "Only Girl (In the World)" at the 31st Brit Awards on February 15, 2011, as part of a medley with two other singles from Loud: "S&M" and "What's My Name?". She had planned to perform "S&M" only (to coincide with its United Kingdom release), but was asked by the British Phonographic Industry to "tone down the sexual references in the song's lyrics". Rihanna was reportedly angered at the request and a related one to perform a different song. She made the changes because the BPI wanted to avoid complaints like those received after the seventh-series finale of The X Factor on December 11, 2010. Rihanna performed "Only Girl (In the World)", "California King Bed", "What's My Name?" and "S&M" on NBC's May 27, 2011 Today as part of its summer concert series. The song, which was included on the Loud, 777 and the Diamonds World Tours, was the opener for her performance at Radio 1's Hackney Weekend on June 24, 2012. She also performed the song at the 2016 MTV Video Music Awards. She performed the song as part of her setlist during the halftime show of Super Bowl LVII, mashed up with "Where Have You Been".

Katy Perry covered "Only Girl (In the World)" as part of an acoustic mash-up with Willow Smith's "Whip My Hair" on her California Dreams Tour (2011). Ellie Goulding covered the song during her appearance on Radio 1's Live Lounge, and the cover was the B-side of her single "Lights". American experimental band Xiu Xiu covered the song on a 7-inch single in 2011.

== Track listing ==
- Digital download
1. "Only Girl (In the World)" – 3:55
- Digital download (Extended Club)
1. "Only Girl (In the World)" (Extended Club) – 5:38
- German CD single
1. "Only Girl (In the World)" – 3:55
2. "Only Girl (In the World)" (Extended Club Mix) – 5:39
- UK CD single
1. "Only Girl (In the World)" (Album Version) – 3:55
2. "Only Girl (In the World)" (Instrumental) – 3:55
- Digital download (Remixes)
1. "Only Girl (In the World)" (The Bimbo Jones Radio) – 3:52
2. "Only Girl (In the World)" (Rosabel's "Only Radio Edit In The World") – 4:09
3. "Only Girl (In the World)" (Mixin Marc & Tony Svejda Radio Mix) – 4:10
4. "Only Girl (In the World)" (CCW Radio Mix) – 3:42
5. "Only Girl (In the World)" (The Bimbo Jones Club) – 7:17
6. "Only Girl (In the World)" (Rosabel's "Only Club In The World") – 8:35
7. "Only Girl (In the World)" (Mixin Marc & Tony Svejda Club Mix) – 6:25
8. "Only Girl (In the World)" (CCW Blow It Up Club Mix) – 9:44
9. "Only Girl (In the World)" (The Bimbo Jones Dub) – 7:32
10. "Only Girl (In the World)" (Rosabel's "Only Dub In The World") – 8:21
11. "Only Girl (In the World)" (Mixin Marc & Tony Svejda Instrumental) – 6:23
12. "Only Girl (In the World)" (CCW Dub) – 7:27

== Awards ==
Year	Ceremony	Award	Result	Ref.
2011	53rd Annual Grammy Awards	Best Dance Recording	Won	
2011	International Dance Music Awards	Best Pop Dance Track	Nominated	
2011	International Dance Music Awards	Best R&B/Urban Dance Track	Won	
2011	2011 Soul Train Music Awards	Best Dance Performance	Nominated	
2011	ASCAP Pop Music Awards	Most Performed Song	Won	
2012	ASCAP Pop Music Awards	Most Performed Song	Won	
2012	BMI Awards	BMI Pop Awards	Won	

== Charts ==
=== Weekly charts ===
Weekly chart performance
Chart (2010–2011)	Peak position
Australia (ARIA)	1
Australian Urban (ARIA)	1
Austria (Ö3 Austria Top 40)	1
Belgium (Ultratop 50 Flanders)	2
Belgium Dance (Ultratop Flanders)	2
Belgium (Ultratop 50 Wallonia)	1
Belgium Dance (Ultratop Wallonia)	2
Canada Hot 100 (Billboard)	1
CIS Airplay (TopHit)	14
Croatia International Airplay (HRT)	1
Czech Republic Airplay (ČNS IFPI)	5
Denmark (Tracklisten)	2
Europe (European Hot 100 Singles)	1
Finland (Suomen virallinen lista)	2
France (SNEP)	2
Germany (GfK)	2
Hungary (Dance Top 40)	4
Hungary (Rádiós Top 40)	1
Ireland (IRMA)	1
Italy (FIMI)	1
Italy Airplay (EarOne)	31
Japan Hot 100 (Billboard)	8
Luxembourg Digital Song Sales (Billboard)	2
Mexico Anglo (Monitor Latino)	2
Netherlands (Dutch Top 40)	2
Netherlands (Single Top 100)	2
New Zealand (Recorded Music NZ)	1
Norway (VG-lista)	1
Poland Airplay (ZPAV)	1
Poland Dance (ZPAV)	1
Portugal Digital Song Sales (Billboard)	1
Romania (Romanian Top 100)	3
Romania Airplay (Media Forest)	1
Romania TV Airplay (Media Forest)	1
Russia Airplay (TopHit)	16
Scottish Singles Sales (Official Charts)	1
Slovakia Airplay (ČNS IFPI)	1
South Korea Foreign (Circle)	6
Spain (Promusicae)	2
Sweden (Sverigetopplistan)	2
Switzerland (Schweizer Hitparade)	2
UK Singles (Official Charts)	1
Ukraine Airplay (TopHit)	60
US Billboard Hot 100	1
US Adult Contemporary (Billboard)	17
US Adult Pop Airplay (Billboard)	11
US Dance Club Songs (Billboard)	1
US Hot Latin Songs (Billboard)	14
US Pop Airplay (Billboard)	1
US Rhythmic Airplay (Billboard)	1

2023–2026 weekly chart performance
Chart (2023–2026)	Peak position
Canada (Canadian Hot 100)	50
Global 200 (Billboard)	74
Greece International (IFPI)	62
Portugal (AFP)	199
Slovakia Singles Digital (ČNS IFPI)	80
US Digital Song Sales (Billboard)	11
US Hot Dance/Electronic Songs (Billboard)	4

=== Year-end charts ===
2010 year-end chart performance
Chart (2010)	Position
Australia (ARIA)	7
Australian Urban (ARIA)	4
Austria (Ö3 Austria Top 40)	18
Belgium (Ultratop 50 Flanders)	22
Belgium (Ultratop 50 Wallonia)	22
Brazil (Crowley)	35
Canada (Canadian Hot 100)	30
CIS (TopHit)	183
Croatia International Airplay (HRT)	80
Denmark (Tracklisten)	15
France (SNEP)	17
Germany (Official German Charts)	18
Hungary (Dance Top 40)	92
Hungary (Rádiós Top 40)	75
Ireland (IRMA)	5
Italy (FIMI)	40
Japan Adult Contemporary (Billboard)	83
Netherlands (Dutch Top 40)	22
Netherlands (Single Top 100)	23
New Zealand (RMNZ)	14
South Korea Foreign (Circle)	41
Spain (PROMUSICAE)	26
Sweden (Sverigetopplistan)	8
Switzerland (Schweizer Hitparade)	11
Taiwan (Yearly Singles Top 100)	77
UK Singles (OCC)	4
US Billboard Hot 100	47
US Dance Club Songs (Billboard)	46
US Mainstream Top 40 (Billboard)	45
US Rhythmic (Billboard)	48

2011 year-end chart performance
Chart (2011)	Position
Australia (ARIA)	74
Australian Urban (ARIA)	24
Austria (Ö3 Austria Top 40)	67
Belgium (Ultratop 50 Flanders)	68
Belgium (Ultratop 50 Wallonia)	70
Brazil (Crowley)	31
Canada (Canadian Hot 100)	27
Germany (Official German Charts)	82
Hungary (Dance Top 40)	29
Hungary (Rádiós Top 40)	15
Italy (Musica e dischi)	61
Japan (Japan Hot 100)	94
Netherlands (Dutch Top 40)	54
Netherlands (Single Top 100)	92
Romania (Romanian Top 100)	44
Russia Airplay (TopHit)	170
Sweden (Sverigetopplistan)	32
Switzerland (Schweizer Hitparade)	42
UK Singles (OCC)	68
Ukraine Airplay (TopHit)	198
US Billboard Hot 100	40
US Adult Contemporary (Billboard)	37
US Adult Top 40 (Billboard)	43
US Latin Pop Songs (Billboard)	30
US Mainstream Top 40 (Billboard)	33
US Rhythmic (Billboard)	23

2023 year-end chart performance
Chart (2023)	Position
US Hot Dance/Electronic Songs (Billboard)	52

2025 year-end chart performance
Chart (2025)	Position
Belgium (Ultratop 50 Flanders)	194
Hungary (Rádiós Top 40)	88
Poland (Polish Airplay Top 100)	83

=== All-time charts ===
All-time chart performance
Chart	Position
UK Singles (OCC)	99

== Certifications and sales ==
Region	Certification	Certified units/sales
Australia (ARIA)	14× Platinum	980,000^{‡}
Belgium (BRMA)	Platinum	30,000^{*}
Brazil (Pro-Música Brasil)	2× Diamond	500,000^{‡}
Denmark (IFPI Danmark)	3× Platinum	270,000^{‡}
France	—	205,000
Germany (BVMI)	5× Gold	750,000^{‡}
Italy (FIMI)	Platinum	30,000^{*}
New Zealand (RMNZ)	5× Platinum	150,000^{‡}
Spain (Promusicae)	Platinum	60,000^{‡}
Sweden (GLF)	4× Platinum	160,000^{‡}
Switzerland (IFPI Switzerland)	2× Platinum	60,000^{^}
United Kingdom (BPI)	4× Platinum	2,400,000^{‡}
United States (RIAA)	7× Platinum	7,000,000^{‡}
Streaming
Greece (IFPI Greece)	2× Platinum	4,000,000^{†}
^{*} Sales figures based on certification alone.^{^} Shipments figures based on certification alone.^{‡} Sales+streaming figures based on certification alone.^{†} Streaming-only figures based on certification alone.

== Release history ==
Release dates and formats
Region	Date	Format	Version	Label	Ref.
Various (Note: Countries released on September 10, 2010: Australia, Denmark, Germany, Italy, Japan, Netherlands, New Zealand.)	September 10, 2010	Digital download	Original	Island Def Jam	
Various (Note: Countries released on September 13, 2010: Belgium, Canada, Finland, France, Norway, Portugal, Spain, Sweden, Switzerland, United States.)	September 13, 2010	Digital download	Original	Island Def Jam	
United States	September 21, 2010	Contemporary hit radio; rhythmic contemporary radio	Original	Island Def Jam	
United Kingdom	October 25, 2010	CD	Original; instrumental	Mercury	
United Kingdom	October 25, 2010	Digital download	Original	Mercury	

== See also ==
- List of number-one singles of 2010 (Australia)
- List of number-one hits of 2010 (Austria)
- List of Canadian Hot 100 number-one singles of 2010
- List of European number-one hits of 2010
- List of number-one singles of 2010 (Ireland)
- List of number-one hits of 2010 (Italy)
- List of number-one singles from the 2010s (New Zealand)
- List of number-one songs in Norway
- List of number-one singles of 2010 (Poland)
- List of number-one dance singles of 2010 (Poland)
- List of number-one digital songs of 2010 (U.S.)
- List of UK Singles Chart number ones of the 2010s
- List of Billboard Hot 100 number ones of 2010
- List of Billboard Hot Dance Club Songs number ones of 2010
- List of number-one dance airplay hits of 2010 (U.S.)
- List of Billboard Mainstream Top 40 number-one songs of 2010
- List of Eurodance songs
- List of highest-certified singles in Australia
