= Today Was a Fairytale =

2010 single by Taylor Swift

Single by Taylor Swift

from the album Valentine's Day (Original Motion Picture Soundtrack)
- Released: January 19, 2010
- Recorded: 2009
- Genre: Country
- Length: 4:02
- Label: Big Machine
- Songwriter: Taylor Swift
- Producers: Taylor Swift; Nathan Chapman

Taylor Swift singles chronology
"Fearless" (2010)	"Today Was a Fairytale" (2010)	"Half of My Heart" (2010)

Audio video
- "Today Was a Fairytale" on YouTube

2011 re-release cover

"Today Was a Fairytale (Taylor's Version)"

Song by Taylor Swift

from the album Fearless (Taylor's Version)
- Released: April 9, 2021
- Studio: Blackbird Studio (Nashville, TN); Kitty Committee Studio (London, England); Prime Recording (Nashville, TN)
- Length: 4:02
- Label: Republic
- Songwriter: Taylor Swift
- Producers: Taylor Swift; Christopher Rowe

Lyric video
- "Today Was a Fairytale (Taylor's Version)" on YouTube

"Today Was a Fairytale" is a song written and recorded by the American singer-songwriter Taylor Swift. Produced by Swift and Nathan Chapman, it was released digitally on January 19, 2010, by Big Machine Records as a single from the soundtrack for the 2010 film Valentine's Day, in which she acted. Swift had previously written the song and offered it to producers for the film's soundtrack. Musically, "Today Was a Fairytale" is a country ballad and, lyrically, it speaks of a magical date.

Some critics deemed "Today Was a Fairytale" the best song on the Valentine's Day soundtrack, but some others deemed it bland. The song peaked at number one in Canada, number two in the United States, and number six in Australia. Swift included the track on a revised set list for the continuation of her Fearless Tour in 2010. The song was re-recorded and released as "Today Was a Fairytale (Taylor's Version)", as part of Swift's 2021 re-recorded album, Fearless (Taylor's Version).

== Background and release ==
Swift solely penned "Today Was a Fairytale" in the summer of 2008 and stored it away for a while. After being cast as Felicia Miller on Valentine's Day, Swift offered the song to the film producers for the soundtrack as she did not believe it fit on her upcoming album. "When this movie opportunity came about, I reached back into my pocket and thought, 'I think this is perfect for the soundtrack. I hope it's perfect for the soundtrack'", Swift told The Tennessean. "Today Was a Fairytale" was released as a single from the Valentine's Day soundtrack on January 19, 2010, exclusively through the iTunes Store. The single was re-released on February 15, 2011, with a more country mix compared to the original version. Swift released a re-recorded version, "Today Was a Fairytale (Taylor's Version)", as the twentieth track on her re-recorded album Fearless (Taylor's Version), on April 9, 2021.

== Composition ==
"Today Was a Fairytale" has a length of four minutes and two seconds. It is set in common time and has a ballad tempo of 80 beats per minute. It is written in the key of G major and Swift's vocals span a little more than one octave, from G_{3} to C_{5}. It follows the chord progression G–C–Em–D. Jody Rosen and Jonas Weiner of Slate magazine noted that although Swift typically sings country pop, "with the possible exception of that woodsy acoustic guitar" in the song's introduction "Today Was a Fairytale" displays no aspects of country music in either its instrumentation or vocals. "Taylor's vowels have gotten flattened and Yankee-ified," commented Rosen, though Weiner pointed out that Swift's pop-heavy music was the primary reason for her success. Hannah Mylrea from NME, meanwhile, described it as a country song. Melanie Bertoldi of Billboard believed Swift's vocals displayed a newfound maturity. There are two different versions of the song's intro: the first one having much more electronic production while the second one is only accompanied by an acoustic guitar.

The song's lyrics describe a magical date. Like many of Swift's songs, the lyrics invoke princess imagery with lines such as "Today was a fairytale/You were the prince/I used to be a damsel in distress." Bertoldi said the lyrics were "driven more by sweeping emotion than [...] specific, youth-focused imagery". Occasionally, Swift does interrupt the fairytale construct with modern day, real world details like the time her date arrives or the color of his shirt.

== Critical reception ==
The song received generally positive reviews from contemporary critics. Melanie Bertoldi of Billboard compared the song's lyrics to those of Swift's previous singles "You Belong with Me" and "Fifteen"; she was convinced that "Today Was a Fairytale" would "help [Swift] reach an even broader audience." Leah Greenblatt of Entertainment Weekly did not see a departure from Swift, recalling lyrics to be familiar of those of "Love Story" and "You Belong with Me". However, she ended with "What do we know? The song sounds Taylor-made (oh, the wit!) for her fans, and we’re just happy she's still sweet, neat, and [...] age-appropriate." An uncredited review from People magazine said the track led the Valentine's Day soundtrack. Brittany Talarico of British magazine OK! called the song's refrains "catchy" and described the overall feel as "sweet." Andrew Leahey of AllMusic said that there was special attention placed on Swift's tracks on the soundtrack, particularly on the song. Jody Rosen of Slate magazine declared "Today Was a Fairytale" "track of the week", highlighting its imagery that, according to her, "sharpen the focus instead of softening it." Jonah Weiner, also of Slate, wrote, "This song is a funny mix: some of her tightest songwriting to date, but some of her laziest lyrics." He mentioned that in the lyrics, Swift mainly "invoke[d] the cliché and hope[d] it [did] her heavy lifting for her." In June 2022, Insider ranked "Today Was a Fairytale" as Swift's second worst soundtrack song.

== Commercial performance ==
On the week ending February 6, 2010, "Today Was a Fairytale" debuted at number two on the Billboard Hot 100 (below Kesha's "Tik Tok"). This was due to the sales of 325,000 digital downloads, which broke the record for largest first-week download sales by a female artist previously set by Britney Spears's "Womanizer". In the succeeding week, the song descended to number 22. It spent a total of 18 weeks on the chart. "Today Was a Fairytale" additionally peaked at number one on the Digital Song Sales chart, number 20 on the Mainstream Top 40 chart, number 21 on the Adult Contemporary chart, and number 41 on the Hot Country Songs chart. It was certified platinum by the Recording Industry Association of America (RIAA) for the sales of over one million units. As of November 2014, "Today Was a Fairytale" had sold 1.6 million digital downloads in the United States.

"Today Was a Fairytale" was Swift's first song to peak at number one on the Canadian Hot 100. The song peaked at number six in Australia and was certified platinum by the Australian Recording Industry Association (ARIA) for sales of 70,000 units. It peaked at number 29 in New Zealand, number 41 in Ireland, number 57 in the United Kingdom, and number 63 in Japan.

== Live performances ==
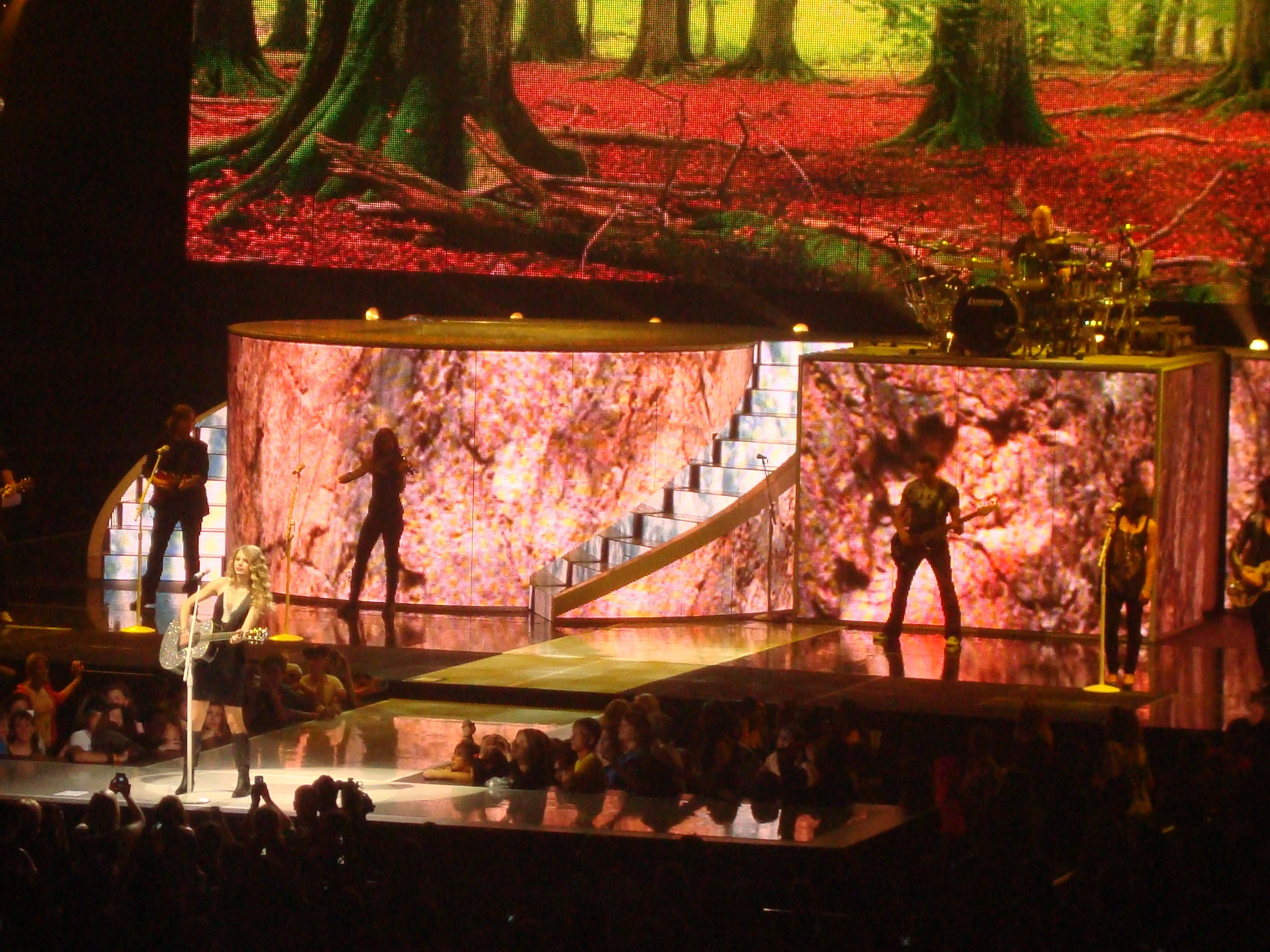
Swift performing "Today Was a Fairytale" on the second North American leg of the Fearless Tour

Swift performed a medley, which included the song, at the 52nd Grammy Awards. Swift performed "Today Was a Fairytale", with a wooden acoustic guitar. After performing the track, she announced "It's a fairy tale and an honor to share the stage with Stevie Nicks." Following, the two performed a cover of Fleetwood Mac's "Rhiannon" (1976). Swift and Nicks then performed a twangy version of Swift's "You Belong with Me". Eric Ditzian of MTV News was disappointed at Swift and Nicks's harmonies, but said the two "made for a compelling twosome". The performance followed much backlash in regards to Swift's off-key singing, which caused Scott Borchetta, the CEO of Big Machine Records, to issue a statement defending the performance.

Swift annexed "Today Was a Fairytale" to a revised set list for the continuation of her Fearless Tour in 2010. During the performances, which was the penultimate of each concert, Swift was usually costumed in a black cocktail dress with a v-neck cut and black, leather boots. She performed with a rhinestoned acoustic guitar center-stage as a forest was projected on the stage; concluding the performance, clips from Valentine's Day were depicted and, following its completion, confetti dropped from the ceiling. At the May 22, 2010 concert at the Air Canada Centre in Toronto, Ontario, Canada, Jane Stevenson of The Toronto Sun said that Swift wearing a Toronto Maple Leafs jersey "didn't hurt [her] popularity either in this hockey-mad town." Molly Trust of Billboard noted the performance at the tour's final concert on June 5, 2010 at Gillette Stadium in Foxborough, Massachusetts "sported a touch of a hometown feel, as Swift literally and figuratively played to the crowd in a Patriots shirt." Swift later performed the song on select dates on the Red Tour (2013–2014) in place of "I Almost Do"; and during the Eras Tour (2023–2024) as a surprise song for the second Houston show and the third Warsaw show as a mashup with "I Think He Knows".

== Chart performance ==
=== Weekly charts ===
Chart (2010)	Peak position
Australia (ARIA)	3
Canada Hot 100 (Billboard)	1
Canada AC (Billboard)	45
Canada CHR/Top 40 (Billboard)	38
Canada Hot AC (Billboard)	36
Ireland (IRMA)	41
Japan Hot 100	63
New Zealand (Recorded Music NZ)	29
Scottish Singles Sales (Official Charts)	46
UK Singles (Official Charts)	57
US Billboard Hot 100	2
US Adult Contemporary (Billboard)	21
US Adult Pop Airplay (Billboard)	21
US Hot Country Songs (Billboard)	41
US Pop Airplay (Billboard)	20

=== Year-end charts ===
Chart (2010)	Position
Australia (ARIA)	72
US Billboard Hot 100	84

== Certifications ==
Certifications for "Today Was a Fairytale"
Region	Certification	Certified units/sales
Australia (ARIA)	2× Platinum	140,000^{‡}
United States (RIAA)	Platinum	1,600,000
^{‡} Sales+streaming figures based on certification alone.

== Release history ==
List of release dates with formats and record labels
Country	Date	Format	Label
United States	January 19, 2010	Digital download	Big Machine
Australia	January 22, 2010	Digital download	Big Machine
Japan	January 22, 2010	Digital download	Big Machine
United States	February 9, 2010	Contemporary hit radio	Big Machine; Republic
Germany	March 12, 2010	Digital download	Universal
United States	February 15, 2011	Digital download (re-release)	Big Machine

== See also ==
- List of Billboard Hot 100 top-ten singles in 2010
- List of number-one digital songs of 2010 (U.S.)
- List of Hot 100 number-one singles of 2010 (Canada)
