= List of number-one digital songs of 2010 (U.S.) =

2010 highest-selling digital singles in the United States

The highest-selling digital singles in the United States are ranked in the Hot Digital Songs chart, published by Billboard magazine. The data are compiled by Nielsen SoundScan based on each single's weekly digital sales, which combines sales of different versions of a single for a summarized figure.

== Chart history ==
Key
†	Indicates best-charting digital song of 2010

Issue date	Song	Artist(s)	Weekly sales	Ref(s)
January 2	"Tik Tok" †	Kesha	221,000	
January 9	"Tik Tok" †	Kesha	610,000	
January 16	"Tik Tok" †	Kesha	394,000	
January 23	"Tik Tok" †	Kesha	252,000	
January 30	"Tik Tok" †	Kesha	244,000	
February 6	"Today Was a Fairytale"	Taylor Swift	325,000	
February 13	"Tik Tok"	Kesha	200,000	
February 20	"Imma Be"	The Black Eyed Peas	236,000	
February 27	"We Are the World 25 for Haiti"	Artists for Haiti	267,000	
March 6	"We Are the World 25 for Haiti"	Artists for Haiti	208,000	
March 13	"Imma Be"	The Black Eyed Peas	187,000	
March 20	"Break Your Heart"	Taio Cruz featuring Ludacris	273,000	
March 27	"Break Your Heart"	Taio Cruz featuring Ludacris	202,000	
April 3	"Break Your Heart"	Taio Cruz featuring Ludacris	176,000	
April 10	"Hey, Soul Sister"	Train	182,000	
April 17	"Hey, Soul Sister"	Train	219,000	
April 24	"Hey, Soul Sister"	Train	204,000	
May 1	"Nothin' on You"	B.o.B featuring Bruno Mars	184,000	
May 8	"Nothin' on You"	B.o.B featuring Bruno Mars	179,000	
May 15	"OMG"	Usher featuring will.i.am	217,000	
May 22	"Not Afraid"	Eminem	380,000	
May 29	"California Gurls"	Katy Perry featuring Snoop Dogg	294,000	
June 5	"OMG"	Usher featuring will.i.am	236,000	
June 12	"California Gurls"	Katy Perry featuring Snoop Dogg	269,000	
June 19	"California Gurls"	Katy Perry featuring Snoop Dogg	318,000	
June 26	"California Gurls"	Katy Perry featuring Snoop Dogg	359,000	
July 3	"California Gurls"	Katy Perry featuring Snoop Dogg	337,000	
July 10	"Love the Way You Lie"	Eminem featuring Rihanna	338,000	
July 17	"Love the Way You Lie"	Eminem featuring Rihanna	280,000	
July 24	"Love the Way You Lie"	Eminem featuring Rihanna	314,000	
July 31	"Love the Way You Lie"	Eminem featuring Rihanna	352,000	
August 7	"Love the Way You Lie"	Eminem featuring Rihanna	332,000	
August 14	"Love the Way You Lie"	Eminem featuring Rihanna	300,000	
August 21	"Mine"	Taylor Swift	297,000	
August 28	"Love the Way You Lie"	Eminem featuring Rihanna	254,000	
September 4	"Right Above It"	Lil Wayne featuring Drake	225,000	
September 11	"Teenage Dream"	Katy Perry	259,000	
September 18	"Teenage Dream"	Katy Perry	221,000	
September 25	"Just the Way You Are"	Bruno Mars	209,000	
October 2	"Only Girl (In the World)"	Rihanna	249,000	
October 9	"Just the Way You Are"	Bruno Mars	188,000	
October 16	"Like a G6"	Far East Movement featuring The Cataracs and Dev	216,000	
October 23	"Like a G6"	Far East Movement featuring The Cataracs and Dev	221,000	
October 30	"Back to December"	Taylor Swift	241,000	
November 6	"Like a G6"	Far East Movement featuring The Cataracs and Dev	204,000	
November 13	"We R Who We R"	Kesha	280,000	
November 20	"What's My Name?"	Rihanna featuring Drake	235,000	
November 27	"Teenage Dream"	Glee Cast	214,000	
December 4	"Forget You"	Glee Cast featuring Gwyneth Paltrow	192,000	
December 11	"Firework"	Katy Perry	232,000	
December 18	"Firework"	Katy Perry	212,000	
December 25	"Firework"	Katy Perry	201,000	

== See also ==
- 2010 in music
- Hot Digital Songs
