= List of number-one singles of 2010 (Poland) =

This is a list of the songs that reached number-one position in official Polish single chart in ZPAV in 2010.

== Chart history ==
Issue Date	Song	Artist(s)	Reference(s)
March 27	"Monday Morning"	Melanie Fiona	
April 3	"Monday Morning"	Melanie Fiona	
April 10	"Nothing Compares 2 U"	Sinéad O'Connor	
April 17	"Young Forever"	Jay-Z featuring Mr. Hudson	
April 24	"Young Forever"	Jay-Z featuring Mr. Hudson	
May 1	"Young Forever"	Jay-Z featuring Mr. Hudson	
May 8	"Monday Morning"	Melanie Fiona	
May 15	"I Like"	Keri Hilson	
May 22	"Secrets"	OneRepublic	
May 29	"Secrets"	OneRepublic	
June 5	"In My Head"	Jason Derulo	
June 12	"Who Wants to Be Alone"	Tiësto featuring Nelly Furtado	
June 19	"Whataya Want from Me"	Adam Lambert	
June 26	"Whataya Want from Me"	Adam Lambert	
July 3	"Whataya Want from Me"	Adam Lambert	
July 10	"Alejandro"	Lady Gaga	
July 17	"California Gurls"	Katy Perry featuring Snoop Dogg	
July 24	"Can't Fight This Feeling"	Junior Caldera featuring Sophie Ellis-Bextor	
July 29	"Alejandro"	Lady Gaga	
August 7	"Alejandro"	Lady Gaga	
August 14	"Morena"	Tom Boxer featuring Antonia	
August 21	"Waka Waka (This Time for Africa)"	Shakira featuring Freshlyground	
August 28	"Club Can't Handle Me"	Flo Rida featuring David Guetta	
September 4	"Club Can't Handle Me"	Flo Rida featuring David Guetta	
September 11	"Club Can't Handle Me"	Flo Rida featuring David Guetta	
September 18	"Club Can't Handle Me"	Flo Rida featuring David Guetta	
September 25	"Club Can't Handle Me"	Flo Rida featuring David Guetta	
October 2	"Club Can't Handle Me"	Flo Rida featuring David Guetta	
October 9	"Club Can't Handle Me"	Flo Rida featuring David Guetta	
October 16	"Love the Way You Lie"	Eminem featuring Rihanna	
October 23	"Wonderful Life"	Hurts	
October 30	"Wonderful Life"	Hurts	
November 6	"Wonderful Life"	Hurts	
November 13	"Not Giving Up on Love"	Armin van Buuren featuring Sophie Ellis-Bextor	
November 20	"Loca"	Shakira featuring Dizzee Rascal	
November 27	"Loca"	Shakira featuring Dizzee Rascal	
December 4	"Loca"	Shakira featuring Dizzee Rascal	
December 11	"Only Girl (In the World)"	Rihanna	
December 18	"Only Girl (In the World)"	Rihanna	
December 24	"Only Girl (In the World)"	Rihanna	

== Number-one artists ==
Position	Artist	Weeks at #1
1	Flo Rida	7
1	David Guetta	7
2	Shakira	4
2	Rihanna	4
3	Jay-Z	3
3	Adam Lambert	3
3	Lady Gaga	3
3	Melanie Fiona	3
3	Hurts	3
3	Dizzee Rascal	3
4	OneRepublic	2
4	Sophie Ellis-Bextor	2
5	Sinéad O'Connor	1
5	Katy Perry	1
5	Keri Hilson	1
5	Jason Derülo	1
5	Tiësto	1
5	Junior Caldera	1
5	Tom Boxer	1
5	Eminem	1
5	Armin van Buuren	1
5	Mr. Hudson	1
5	Nelly Furtado	1
5	Snoop Dogg	1
5	Freshlyground	1
5	Antonia	1

== See also ==
- List of number-one dance singles of 2010 (Poland)
- List of number-one albums of 2010 (Poland)
