= Psychology of Aesthetics, Creativity, and the Arts =

Quarterly peer-reviewed academic journal

- Language: English
- Edited by: Amy Belfi, Selcuk Acar

Publication details
- History: 2007-present
- Publisher: American Psychological Association
- Frequency: Bimonthly (February, April, June, August, October and December)
- Impact factor: 2.7 (2024)

Standard abbreviations
- ISO 4: Psychol. Aesthet. Creat. Arts

Indexing
- ISSN: 1931-3896 (print); 1931-390X (web)

Links
- Journal homepage; Online access

Psychology of Aesthetics, Creativity, and the Arts is a bimonthly peer-reviewed academic journal published by the American Psychological Association. The journal covers research on the psychology of the production and appreciation of the arts and all aspects of creative endeavor. The current editors-in-chief are Amy Belfi and Selcuk Acar. The founding co-editors of the journal were Jeffrey Smith, Lisa Smith, and James C. Kaufman.

== Abstracting and indexing ==
The journal is abstracted and indexed in the Social Sciences Citation Index. According to the Journal Citation Reports, the journal has a 2024 impact factor of 2.7.
