= List of number-one albums of 2010 (Poland) =

These are the Polish number one albums of 2010, per the OLiS Chart.

== Chart history ==
Issue Date	Album	Artist(s)	Reference(s)
January 11	My Christmas	Andrea Bocelli	
January 18	The Fame Monster	Lady Gaga	
January 25	Magia Del Tango	Marcin Wyrostek	
February 1	Magia Del Tango	Marcin Wyrostek	
February 8	Magia Del Tango	Marcin Wyrostek	
February 15	Soldier of Love	Sade	
February 22	Soldier of Love	Sade	
March 1	Soldier of Love	Sade	
March 8	Dodekafonia	Strachy na Lachy	
March 15	Tylko dla dorosłych	O.S.T.R.	
March 22	Soldier of Love	Sade	
March 29	Soldier of Love	Sade	
April 6	Soldier of Love	Sade	
April 12	Ania Movie	Ania	
April 19	Ania Movie	Ania	
April 26	Ania Movie	Ania	
May 4	Ania Movie	Ania	
May 17	Ania Movie	Ania	
May 24	Ania Movie	Ania	
May 31	Ania Movie	Ania	
June 7	The House	Katie Melua	
June 14	The House	Katie Melua	
June 21	Totem leśnych ludzi	DonGURALesko	
June 28	The House	Katie Melua	
July 5	The House	Katie Melua	
July 12	Zapiski z 1001 nocy	Eldo	
July 19	Zapiski z 1001 nocy	Eldo	
July 26	Symphonicities	Sting	
August 2	Symphonicities	Sting	
August 9	Symphonicities	Sting	
August 16	Symphonicities	Sting	
August 23	Symphonicities	Sting	
August 30	Vivere – The Best Of	Andrea Bocelli	
September 6	Italia	Chris Botti	
September 13	Italia	Chris Botti	
September 20	Debiut	Czesław Śpiewa	
September 27	Debiut	Czesław Śpiewa	
October 4	Symphonicities	Sting	
October 11	Guitar Heaven: The Greatest Guitar Classics of All Time	Carlos Santana	
October 18	Guitar Heaven: The Greatest Guitar Classics of All Time	Carlos Santana	
October 25	Guitar Heaven: The Greatest Guitar Classics of All Time	Carlos Santana	
November 2	Come Around Sundown	Kings of Leon	
November 8	Come Around Sundown	Kings of Leon	
November 15	Siesta 6 – Muzyka świata – prezentuje Marcin Kydryński	Różni wykonawcy	
November 22	XXX	Perfect	
November 29	Muza	Dżem	
December 6	MTV Unplugged Kult	Kult	
December 13	MTV Unplugged Kult	Kult	
December 20	Szanuj	Stard Guard Muffin	
December 27	MTV Unplugged Kult	Kult	

== See also ==
- List of number-one singles of 2010 (Poland)
