= The Remix (Lady Gaga album) =

- United States, United Kingdom and Asia album cover

Remix album by Lady Gaga
- Released: March 3, 2010
- Genres: Electronic; dance
- Length: 77:15
- Labels: Streamline; KonLive; Cherrytree; Interscope
- Producers: Various: Alphabeat; Chew Fu; Crookers; Deewaan; Frankmusik; Rob Fusari; Fernando Garibay; Guéna LG; Grum; Rodney Jerkins; Kaskade; Martin Kierszenbaum; Lady Gaga; Manhattan Clique; Monarchy; Passion Pit; Pet Shop Boys; Stuart Price; RedOne; Skrillex; The Sound of Arrows; Space Cowboy; Starsmith; Richard Vission; Yuksek

Lady Gaga chronology
The Fame Monster (2009)	The Remix (2010)	Born This Way (2011)

Alternative cover
- International album cover

The Remix is a remix album by American singer-songwriter Lady Gaga. Released in Japan on March 3, 2010, it contains remixes of the songs from her first studio album, The Fame (2008), and its reissue, The Fame Monster (2009). A revised version of the track list was prepared for release in additional markets, beginning with Mexico on May 4, 2010. Remixers on the album include Pet Shop Boys, Passion Pit and The Sound of Arrows.

The album received mixed reviews from contemporary critics. It reached the top of charts in Greece and the Dance/Electronic Albums chart of Billboard magazine in the United States. The Remix charted within the top ten in Belgium (Flanders and Wallonia region), Canada, Ireland, Japan, Mexico, the United Kingdom and the Billboard 200 chart of United States. It was certified platinum in Japan and Brazil and received gold certifications in Belgium and Russia. Worldwide the album has sold over 500,000 copies and it is among the best-selling remix albums of all time.

== Background ==
On April 15, 2010, The Guardian reported that a number of artists, including Pet Shop Boys, Passion Pit and Marilyn Manson, would contribute to a remix album by Lady Gaga, titled The Remix. The remixes included in the package had been previously released alongside Gaga's single releases in the past years. The album was originally released in Japan on March 3, 2010, containing sixteen of the remixes. The revised version, consisting of seventeen remixes, was released on May 4, 2010, the first market being Mexico. Manson features on the Chew Fu remix of "LoveGame", while Passion Pit remixed "Telephone" and Pet Shop Boys remixed "Eh, Eh (Nothing Else I Can Say)". Other artists who remixed Gaga's songs included Alphabeat, Frankmusik, Stuart Price, Monarchy and Robots to Mars. The album was released in the United Kingdom on May 10, 2010 and featured a different artwork for that region. The US release of the album was announced by Interscope Records in July 2010 and it was released on August 3, 2010.

== Composition ==
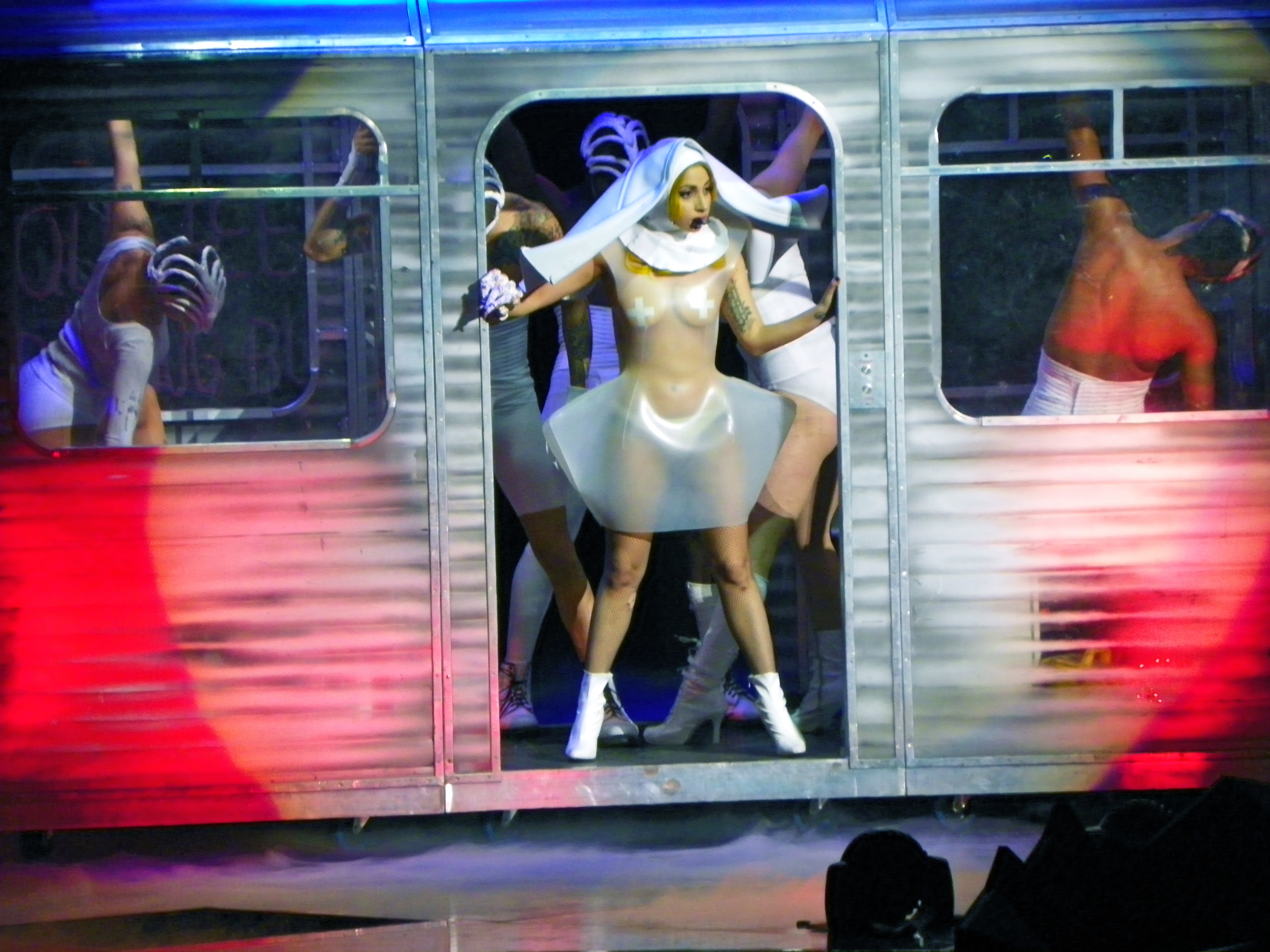
Gaga used fragments of the Chew Fu Ghettohouse Fix version during the performance of "LoveGame" in The Monster Ball Tour.

Chuck Campbell from the California Chronicle felt that the main "trick" adopted by the producers behind The Remix, was to preserve the integrity of Gaga's nuances in her songs, at the same time bringing something new to her music. The second song in the track list, the "LLG vs GLG Radio Mix" of "Poker Face", features a computerized chanting of the "mum-mum-mum-mah" hook of the song. Stuart Price remixed "Paparazzi" into an electronic version, changing the original mid-tempo composition of the song. New vocals were added on top of the song, giving it a jungle-like vibe, according to Nicki Escuerdo from Phoenix New Times. She also felt that the remix of "LoveGame" featuring Manson, changed the original composition by "giving the originally innocent and fun song an almost demonic quality".

According to Campbell, The Monarchy Stylites remix of "Dance in the Dark" "pump[ed] extra oomph" into the song, with addition of drum beats. Richard Vission's remix of "Just Dance" introduced an elastic rhythm in the song, while Frankmusik changed the soft composition of "Eh, Eh (Nothing Else I Can Say)" to a more upbeat one, also manipulating Gaga's vocals in the process. Campbell also added that the Passion Pit remix of "Telephone" felt like a "theatrical set up for a song that feels like it's going somewhere, but never does"; the remix consists of synths, with a thumping beat accompanying the song. Sound of Arrows remixed "Alejandro", changing the dark nature of its music into a bright, summery jam while "Bad Romance" was remixed by Starsmith, making it a complete dance track.

== Critical reception ==
Professional ratings
Aggregate scores
Source	Rating
Metacritic	54/100
Review scores
Source	Rating
AllMusic	3/5 stars
The A.V. Club	C
Billboard	3.5/5 stars
Bloomberg Television	3/5 stars
Daily Express	3/5 stars
Digital Spy	4/5 stars
Entertainment Weekly	B−
The New Zealand Herald	4/5 stars
PopMatters	3/10
Rolling Stone	3/5 stars

Upon its release, the album was met with mixed reviews. At Metacritic it holds an aggregate score of 54 out of 100 points, indicating generally mixed or average reviews. Simon Cage from the Daily Express gave the album three out of five stars and felt that although she "has a winning way with ostentatious hats", Gaga's true talent lies in selling the same album over and over again. "It’s great but... enough already!" Music critic J. D. Considine, while reviewing the album for The Globe and Mail, complimented the piano and voice version of "Poker Face" adding that the latter was "the smartest track on her newest remix album". He felt that the song "brings out her inner Elton John. And yes, this move, too, is probably just another bit of calculated image management, but that doesn’t make it any less brilliant." Robert Copsey from Digital Spy noted that the release of The Remix was a more natural progression than music labels trying to "cash-in" by releasing something not associated with the artist. He complimented the remixers featured in the album, calling them "as vital to keeping the singer's music fresh as her Haus Of GaGa designers are to her image."

Stephen Thomas Erlewine from AllMusic gave the album three out of five stars, but felt that the track list could have been shortened. Erlewine complimented some of the remixes, including those by Pet Shop Boys and Space Cowboy, adding that The Remix "is not an essential addition to Gaga’s canon goes without saying... but there’s glitz and glamour to enjoy here." Mark Beech, reviewing the album for Bloomberg Television, noticed that the already familiar tracks from Gaga "are given a new sheen by the Pet Shop Boys and sometime Madonna producer Stuart Price." Nicki Escudero from Phoenix New Times gave a positive review saying that the songs featured in The Remix can be a great addition during workouts, as well as staple dance floor music. She listed the Chew Fu remix of "LoveGame" as a highlight from the album. Monica Herrera from Billboard complimented the album saying "Gaga has employed a collection of more-than-capable producers to make her dance-ready smashes from The Fame and The Fame Monster even more danceworthy." Giving it three out of five stars, Caryn Ganz from Rolling Stone noted an uneven sequencing among the tracks in The Remix. She felt that the Passion Pit remix of "Telephone" was the best remix on the album.

== Commercial performance ==
Following the album's release in Japan, it debuted at number nine on the Oricon Albums Chart. On the issue dated May 17, 2010, the album moved to a new peak of number seven and has since been certified platinum by the Recording Industry Association of Japan (RIAJ) for shipments of 250,000 copies. In Australia, The Remix entered the ARIA Albums Chart at its peak position of number 12 on May 16, 2010, remaining on the chart for a total of five weeks. In the United Kingdom, the album debuted at number three on the official UK Albums Chart dated May 22, 2010, and has sold 166,440 copies according to the Official Charts Company, being certified gold by the British Phonographic Industry (BPI). Across Europe, the album debuted at seven on the European Top 100 Albums chart of Billboard. The Remix also reached the top of the charts in Greece, while attaining top-ten positions in Belgium (Flanders and Wallonia), Czech Republic, Ireland, the Netherlands and New Zealand.

In the United States, The Remix charted at number six on the Billboard 200 dated August 21, 2010, with 39,000 copies sold. It became Gaga's third top ten album on the Billboard 200. The record also debuted at number one on Billboard's Dance/Electronic Albums making this Gaga's third number one entry on the chart. The same week, her other releases, The Fame and The Fame Monster were at positions two and three, respectively. Billboard chart manager Keith Caulfield noted that Gaga became the first act to occupy the chart's top three positions, in its nine-year history. She additionally charted on the Billboard 200, with The Fame at number 12 and The Fame Monster at number 27, marking the first time an artist placed three concurrent titles in the top 30 since January 23, 1993, when Garth Brooks placed four sets in the top 30: The Chase at number two, Beyond the Season at number 23, Ropin' the Wind at number 26 and No Fences at number 29. According to Nielsen SoundScan, The Remix has sold 315,000 copies in US as of February 2018. In Canada, the album debuted at number five on the Canadian Albums Chart issue dated May 22, 2010, and remained on the chart for a total of ten weeks. The Remix has sold more than 500,000 copies worldwide, and it is among the best-selling remix albums of all time.

== Track listing ==
Non-US and non-Japan edition
No.	Title	Length
1.	"Just Dance" (Richard Vission Remix)	6:13
2.	"Poker Face" (LLG vs. GLG Radio Mix)	4:03
3.	"LoveGame" (Chew Fu Ghettohouse Fix) (featuring Marilyn Manson)	5:21
4.	"Eh, Eh (Nothing Else I Can Say)" (Frankmusik "Cut Snare Edit" Remix)	3:49
5.	"Paparazzi" (Stuart Price Remix)	3:21
6.	"Boys Boys Boys" (Manhattan Clique Remix)	6:37
7.	"The Fame" (Glam as You Remix)	3:57
8.	"Bad Romance" (Starsmith Remix)	4:57
9.	"Telephone" (featuring Beyoncé) (Passion Pit Remix)	5:14
10.	"Alejandro" (Sound of Arrows Remix)	3:59
11.	"Dance in the Dark" (Monarchy 'Stylites' Remix)	6:10
12.	"Just Dance" (Deewaan Remix) (featuring Ashking, Wedis, Lush and Young Thoro)	4:16
13.	"LoveGame" (Robots to Mars Remix)	3:12
14.	"Eh, Eh (Nothing Else I Can Say)" (Pet Shop Boys Remix)	2:49
15.	"Poker Face" (Live from the Cherrytree House)	3:39
16.	"Bad Romance" (Grum Remix)	4:53
17.	"Telephone" (featuring Beyoncé) (Alphabeat Remix)	4:48
Total length:		77:47

US edition
No.	Title	Length
1.	"Just Dance" (Richard Vission Remix)	6:13
2.	"Poker Face" (LLG vs. GLG Radio Mix)	4:03
3.	"LoveGame" (Chew Fu Ghettohouse Fix) (featuring Marilyn Manson)	5:21
4.	"Eh, Eh (Nothing Else I Can Say)" (Frankmusik "Cut Snare Edit" Remix)	3:49
5.	"Paparazzi" (Stuart Price Remix)	3:21
6.	"The Fame" (Glam as You Remix)	3:57
7.	"Bad Romance" (Starsmith Remix)	4:57
8.	"Telephone" (featuring Beyoncé) (Passion Pit Remix)	5:14
9.	"Alejandro" (Sound of Arrows Remix)	3:59
10.	"Dance in the Dark" (Monarchy 'Stylites' Remix)	6:10
Total length:		46:55

Japan edition
No.	Title	Length
1.	"Just Dance" (Space Cowboy Remix)	5:02
2.	"Just Dance" (RedOne Remix)	4:18
3.	"Poker Face" (Space Cowboy Remix)	4:54
4.	"Poker Face" (LLG vs. GLG Radio Mix)	4:03
5.	"Eh, Eh (Nothing Else I Can Say)" (Electric Piano and Human Beat Box Version – The Cherrytree Sessions Version)	3:03
6.	"Eh, Eh (Nothing Else I Can Say)" (Pet Shop Boys Remix)	2:49
7.	"LoveGame" (Space Cowboy Remix)	3:21
8.	"LoveGame" (Chew Fu Ghettohouse Fix) (featuring Marilyn Manson)	5:21
9.	"Paparazzi" (Yuksek Remix)	4:54
10.	"Paparazzi" (Stuart Price Remix)	3:21
11.	"Bad Romance" (Skrillex Remix)	4:24
12.	"Bad Romance" (Starsmith Remix)	4:57
13.	"Bad Romance" (Kaskade Remix)	4:22
14.	"Telephone" (featuring Beyoncé) (Alphabeat Remix)	4:48
15.	"Telephone" (featuring Beyoncé) (Passion Pit Remix)	5:14
16.	"Telephone" (featuring Beyoncé) (Crookers Vocal Remix)	4:51
Total length:		63:43

== Personnel ==
Credits adapted from the liner notes of UK pressings of The Remix. Track numbers correspond to international (non-US and Japan) pressings.

- Max Abadian – photography
- Alphabeat – remix and additional production (track 17)
- Ashking – featured artist (track 12)
- Beyoncé – featured artist (tracks 9 and 17)
- Troy Carter – management
- Chew Fu – production, all instruments, and programming (track 3)
- Deewaan – additional production, recording, and programming (track 12)
- Rohan Dwyer – engineering (track 12)
- Frankmusik – remix and additional production (track 4)
- Grum – remix and additional production (track 16)
- Guéna LG – remix and additional production (tracks 2 and 7)
- Vincent Herbert – executive producer; artists and repertoire
- Martin Kierszenbaum – remix production (track 13); artists and repertoire
- Lady Gaga – primary artist
- Paul Lewis – engineering (track 12)
- Lush – featured artist (track 12)
- Manhattan Clique – remix and additional production (track 6)
- Marilyn Manson – featured artist, additional vocals (track 3)
- Monarchy – remix and additional production (track 11)
- Passion Pit – remix and additional production (track 9)
- Pet Shop Boys – remix and additional production (track 14)
- Stuart Price – remix and additional production (track 5)
- Sound of Arrows – remix and additional production (track 10)
- Starsmith – remix and additional production (track 8)
- Tony Ugval – engineering (tracks 13 and 15); mixing (track 15)
- Richard Vission – remix and additional production (track 1)
- Wedis – featured artist (track 12)
- Young Thoro – featured artist (track 12)

== Charts ==
=== Weekly charts ===
Weekly chart performance for The Remix
Chart (2010)	Peak position
Australian Albums (ARIA)	12
Australian Dance Albums (ARIA)	2
Belgian Albums (Ultratop Flanders)	3
Belgian Albums (Ultratop Wallonia)	6
Brazilian Albums (ABPD)	10
Canadian Albums (Billboard)	5
Croatian International Albums (HDU)	5
Czech Albums (ČNS IFPI)	7
Dutch Albums (Album Top 100)	36
Europe (European Top 100 Albums)	7
Finnish Albums (Suomen virallinen lista)	17
French Albums (SNEP)	19
Greek Albums (IFPI)	1
Hungarian Albums (MAHASZ)	29
Irish Albums (IRMA)	10
Italian Albums (FIMI)	22
Japanese Albums (Oricon)	7
Mexican Albums (Top 100 Mexico)	5
New Zealand Albums (RMNZ)	9
Polish Albums (ZPAV)	13
Russian Albums (NFPF)	1
Scottish Albums (Official Charts)	2
South Korean International Albums (Circle)	39
Spanish Albums (Promusicae)	12
Swedish Albums (Sverigetopplistan)	40
UK Albums (Official Charts)	3
US Billboard 200	6
US Top Dance Albums (Billboard)	1
US Indie Store Album Sales (Billboard)	9

=== Year-end charts ===
2010 year-end chart performance for The Remix
Chart (2010)	Position
Australian Dance Albums (ARIA)	11
Belgian Albums Chart (Flanders)	56
Belgian Albums Chart (Wallonia)	59
Canadian Albums (Billboard)	47
Croatian International Albums (HDU)	34
Japanese Albums (Oricon)	41
Mexican Albums (Top 100 Mexico)	40
UK Albums (OCC)	120
US Dance/Electronic Albums (Billboard)	5

2011 year-end chart performance for The Remix
Chart (2011)	Position
US Dance/Electronic Albums (Billboard)	9

=== Decade-end charts ===
Decade-end chart performance for The Remix
Chart (2010–2019)	Position
US Dance/Electronic Albums (Billboard)	32

== Certifications and sales ==
Certifications and sales for The Remix
Region	Certification	Certified units/sales
Belgium (BRMA)	Gold	15,000^{*}
Brazil (Pro-Música Brasil)	Platinum	40,000^{*}
Japan (RIAJ)	Platinum	250,000^{^}
Russia (NFPF)	Gold	5,000^{*}
United Kingdom (BPI)	Gold	166,440
United States	—	315,000
^{*} Sales figures based on certification alone.^{^} Shipments figures based on certification alone.

== Release history ==
Release dates and formats for The Remix
Region	Date	Format	Label
Japan	March 3, 2010	CD, digital download	Universal Music
Philippines	March 3, 2010	CD, digital download	Universal Music
Australia	April 30, 2010	CD, digital download	Universal Music
Poland	April 30, 2010	CD, digital download	Universal Music
Canada	May 4, 2010	CD, digital download	Universal Music
Colombia	May 4, 2010	CD	Universal Music, Interscope
Italy	May 4, 2010	CD, digital download	Universal Music
Mexico	May 4, 2010	CD, digital download	Universal Music
United Kingdom	May 4, 2010	CD, digital download	Interscope
Brazil	May 5, 2010	CD, digital download	Universal Music
Germany	May 7, 2010	CD, digital download	Universal Music
United States	August 3, 2010	CD, vinyl, digital download	Streamline, KonLive, Cherrytree, Interscope

== See also ==
- List of best-selling remix albums worldwide
- List of Billboard number-one electronic albums of 2010
