= List of Billboard number-one electronic albums of 2010 =

These are the albums that reached number one on the Billboard Dance/Electronic Albums chart in 2010.

== Chart history ==
Key
†	Indicates best-performing album of 2010

Issue date	Album	Artist	Reference
January 2	The Fame †	Lady Gaga	
January 9	The Fame †	Lady Gaga	
January 16	The Fame †	Lady Gaga	
January 23	The Fame †	Lady Gaga	
January 30	The Fame †	Lady Gaga	
February 6	The Fame †	Lady Gaga	
February 13	The Fame †	Lady Gaga	
February 20	The Fame †	Lady Gaga	
February 27	The Fame †	Lady Gaga	
March 6	The Fame †	Lady Gaga	
March 13	The Fame †	Lady Gaga	
March 20	The Fame †	Lady Gaga	
March 27	The Fame †	Lady Gaga	
April 3	The Fame †	Lady Gaga	
April 10	The Fame †	Lady Gaga	
April 17	The Fame †	Lady Gaga	
April 24	The Fame †	Lady Gaga	
May 1	The Fame †	Lady Gaga	
May 8	The Fame †	Lady Gaga	
May 15	The Fame †	Lady Gaga	
May 22	The Fame †	Lady Gaga	
May 29	The Fame †	Lady Gaga	
June 5	This Is Happening	LCD Soundsystem	
June 12	The Fame †	Lady Gaga	
June 19	The Fame †	Lady Gaga	
June 26	The Fame †	Lady Gaga	
July 3	The Fame †	Lady Gaga	
July 10	The Fame †	Lady Gaga	
July 17	Streets of Gold	3OH!3	
July 24	The Fame †	Lady Gaga	
July 31	Maya	M.I.A.	
August 7	The Fame †	Lady Gaga	
August 14	The Fame †	Lady Gaga	
August 21	The Remix	Lady Gaga	
August 28	The Fame †	Lady Gaga	
September 4	The Fame †	Lady Gaga	
September 11	The Fame †	Lady Gaga	
September 18	The Fame †	Lady Gaga	
September 25	The Fame †	Lady Gaga	
October 2	The Fame †	Lady Gaga	
October 9	The Fame †	Lady Gaga	
October 16	The Fame †	Lady Gaga	
October 23	The Fame †	Lady Gaga	
October 30	The Fame †	Lady Gaga	
November 6	The Fame †	Lady Gaga	
November 13	The Fame †	Lady Gaga	
November 20	The Fame †	Lady Gaga	
November 27	The Fame †	Lady Gaga	
December 4	The Fame †	Lady Gaga	
December 11	The Fame †	Lady Gaga	
December 18	The Fame Monster	Lady Gaga	
December 25	Tron: Legacy	Daft Punk	
