= List of Billboard number-one electronic albums of 2011 =

These are the albums that reached number one on the Billboard Dance/Electronic Albums chart in 2011.

== Chart history ==
Key
†	Indicates best-performing album of 2011

Issue date	Album	Artist	Reference
January 1	Tron: Legacy	Daft Punk	
January 8	Tron: Legacy	Daft Punk	
January 15	Tron: Legacy	Daft Punk	
January 22	Tron: Legacy	Daft Punk	
January 29	Tron: Legacy	Daft Punk	
February 5	Tron: Legacy	Daft Punk	
February 12	Tron: Legacy	Daft Punk	
February 19	Tron: Legacy	Daft Punk	
February 26	The Fame	Lady Gaga	
March 5	The Fame	Lady Gaga	
March 12	The Fame	Lady Gaga	
March 19	The Fame	Lady Gaga	
March 26	The Fame	Lady Gaga	
April 2	The Fame	Lady Gaga	
April 9	I Am the Dance Commander + I Command You to Dance: The Remix Album	Kesha	
April 16	The Fame	Lady Gaga	
April 23	Tron: Legacy Reconfigured	Daft Punk	
April 30	Tron: Legacy	Daft Punk	
May 7	The Fall	Gorillaz	
May 14	The Fame	Lady Gaga	
May 21	The Fame	Lady Gaga	
May 28	The Fame	Lady Gaga	
June 4	The Fame	Lady Gaga	
June 11	Born This Way †	Lady Gaga	
June 18	Born This Way †	Lady Gaga	
June 25	Born This Way †	Lady Gaga	
July 2	Born This Way †	Lady Gaga	
July 9	Born This Way †	Lady Gaga	
July 16	Born This Way †	Lady Gaga	
July 23	Born This Way †	Lady Gaga	
July 30	Born This Way †	Lady Gaga	
August 6	Born This Way †	Lady Gaga	
August 13	Born This Way †	Lady Gaga	
August 20	Born This Way †	Lady Gaga	
August 27	Born This Way †	Lady Gaga	
September 3	Born This Way †	Lady Gaga	
September 10	Born This Way †	Lady Gaga	
September 17	Nothing but the Beat	David Guetta	
September 24	Born This Way †	Lady Gaga	
October 1	Born This Way †	Lady Gaga	
October 8	Born This Way †	Lady Gaga	
October 15	Born This Way †	Lady Gaga	
October 22	Born This Way †	Lady Gaga	
October 29	Biophilia	Björk	
November 5	Hurry Up, We're Dreaming	M83	
November 12	Fire & Ice	Kaskade	
November 19	Sorry for Party Rocking	LMFAO	
November 26	Sorry for Party Rocking	LMFAO	
December 3	Sorry for Party Rocking	LMFAO	
December 10	Sorry for Party Rocking	LMFAO	
December 17	Sorry for Party Rocking	LMFAO	
December 24	The Path of Totality	Korn	
December 31	Sorry for Party Rocking	LMFAO	
