= List of Billboard number-one electronic albums of 2008 =

These are the albums that reached number one on the Billboard Dance/Electronic Albums chart in 2008.

== Chart history ==
Key
†	Indicates best-performing album of 2008

Issue date	Album	Artist	Reference
January 5	Kala †	M.I.A.	
January 12	High School Musical 2: Non-Stop Dance Party	Various artists	
January 19	High School Musical 2: Non-Stop Dance Party	Various artists	
January 26	High School Musical 2: Non-Stop Dance Party	Various artists	
February 2	Total Dance 2008	DJ Skribble	
February 9	Ultra.Dance 09	Various artists	
February 16	Hannah Montana 2: Non-Stop Dance Party	Hannah Montana	
February 23	Hannah Montana 2: Non-Stop Dance Party	Hannah Montana	
March 1	Hannah Montana 2: Non-Stop Dance Party	Hannah Montana	
March 8	Hannah Montana 2: Non-Stop Dance Party	Hannah Montana	
March 15	Hannah Montana 2: Non-Stop Dance Party	Hannah Montana	
March 22	Hannah Montana 2: Non-Stop Dance Party	Hannah Montana	
March 29	Hannah Montana 2: Non-Stop Dance Party	Hannah Montana	
April 5	The Odd Couple	Gnarls Barkley	
April 12	The Odd Couple	Gnarls Barkley	
April 19	The Odd Couple	Gnarls Barkley	
April 26	Ghosts I–IV	Nine Inch Nails	
May 3	The Odd Couple	Gnarls Barkley	
May 10	The Odd Couple	Gnarls Barkley	
May 17	The Odd Couple	Gnarls Barkley	
May 24	The Odd Couple	Gnarls Barkley	
May 31	The Odd Couple	Gnarls Barkley	
June 7	Metro Station	Metro Station	
June 14	Metro Station	Metro Station	
June 21	Metro Station	Metro Station	
June 28	Total Club Hits	DJ Skribble	
July 5	Total Club Hits	DJ Skribble	
July 12	Metro Station	Metro Station	
July 19	Metro Station	Metro Station	
July 26	Metro Station	Metro Station	
August 9	The Slip	Nine Inch Nails	
August 16	The Slip	Nine Inch Nails	
August 23	Total Dance 2008: Vol. 2	Striker	
August 30	Total Dance 2008: Vol. 2	Striker	
September 6	Kala †	M.I.A.	
September 13	Kala †	M.I.A.	
September 20	Kala †	M.I.A.	
September 27	Kala †	M.I.A.	
October 4	Kala †	M.I.A.	
October 11	Radio Retaliation	Thievery Corporation	
October 18	Kala †	M.I.A.	
October 25	Kala †	M.I.A.	
November 1	Kala †	M.I.A.	
November 8	Kala †	M.I.A.	
November 15	The Fame	Lady Gaga	
November 22	The Fame	Lady Gaga	
November 29	The Fame	Lady Gaga	
December 6	The Fame	Lady Gaga	
December 13	The Fame	Lady Gaga	
December 20	The Fame	Lady Gaga	
December 27	The Fame	Lady Gaga	
