= List of Billboard number-one electronic albums of 2021 =

These are the albums that reached number one on the Billboard Dance/Electronic Albums chart in 2021.

== Chart history ==
Key
| † | Indicates best-performing album of 2021 |

| Issue date | Album | Artist | Reference |
|---|---|---|---|
| January 2 | Chromatica | Lady Gaga | |
| January 9 | Chromatica | Lady Gaga | |
| January 16 | Chromatica | Lady Gaga | |
| January 23 | Chromatica | Lady Gaga | |
| January 30 | Chromatica | Lady Gaga | |
| February 6 | Chromatica | Lady Gaga | |
| February 13 | Chromatica | Lady Gaga | |
| February 20 | The Fame † | Lady Gaga | |
| February 27 | The Fame † | Lady Gaga | |
| March 6 | Discovery | Daft Punk | |
| March 13 | The Fame † | Lady Gaga | |
| March 20 | The Fame † | Lady Gaga | |
| March 27 | The Fame † | Lady Gaga | |
| April 3 | The Fame † | Lady Gaga | |
| April 10 | The Fame † | Lady Gaga | |
| April 17 | The Fame † | Lady Gaga | |
| April 24 | The Fame † | Lady Gaga | |
| May 1 | The Fame † | Lady Gaga | |
| May 8 | Nurture | Porter Robinson | |
| May 15 | The Fame † | Lady Gaga | |
| May 22 | The Fame † | Lady Gaga | |
| May 29 | The Fame † | Lady Gaga | |
| June 5 | The Fame † | Lady Gaga | |
| June 12 | The Fame † | Lady Gaga | |
| June 19 | The Fame † | Lady Gaga | |
| June 26 | Chromatica | Lady Gaga | |
| July 3 | The Fame † | Lady Gaga | |
| July 10 | Chromatica | Lady Gaga | |
| July 17 | The Fame † | Lady Gaga | |
| July 24 | The Fame † | Lady Gaga | |
| July 31 | Fallen Embers | Illenium | |
| August 7 | The Fame † | Lady Gaga | |
| August 14 | The Fame † | Lady Gaga | |
| August 21 | The Fame † | Lady Gaga | |
| August 28 | Loving in Stereo | Jungle | |
| September 4 | The Fame † | Lady Gaga | |
| September 11 | The Fame † | Lady Gaga | |
| September 18 | Dawn of Chromatica | Lady Gaga | |
| September 25 | The Fame † | Lady Gaga | |
| October 2 | The Fame † | Lady Gaga | |
| October 9 | The Fame † | Lady Gaga | |
| October 16 | The Fame † | Lady Gaga | |
| October 23 | The Fame † | Lady Gaga | |
| October 30 | The Fame † | Lady Gaga | |
| November 6 | The Fame † | Lady Gaga | |
| November 13 | The Fame † | Lady Gaga | |
| November 20 | The Fame † | Lady Gaga | |
| November 27 | The Fame † | Lady Gaga | |
| December 4 | Collage | The Chainsmokers | |
| December 11 | The Golden Age of Apocalypse | Thundercat | |
| December 18 | The Fame † | Lady Gaga | |
| December 25 | Tron: Legacy | Daft Punk | |
