= The Fame =

- Original cover (Note: The text on the American version is colored red instead of blue, and the image has a slight red tint.)

Studio album by Lady Gaga
- Released: August 19, 2008
- Recorded: 2006–2008
- Studios: Record Plant: Chalice (Los Angeles); Cherrytree (Santa Monica); 150 (Parsippany-Troy Hills); Poe Boy (Miami); 333, Dojo (New York City)
- Genres: Electropop; synth-pop; dance-pop
- Length: 50:20
- Labels: Streamline; KonLive; Cherrytree; Interscope
- Producers: Brian & Josh; Rob Fusari; Martin Kierszenbaum; RedOne; Space Cowboy

Lady Gaga chronology
The Fame (2008)	The Cherrytree Sessions (2009)

Singles from The Fame
- 1. "Just Dance" Released: April 8, 2008; 2. "Poker Face" Released: September 23, 2008; 3. "Eh, Eh (Nothing Else I Can Say)" Released: January 10, 2009; 4. "LoveGame" Released: March 23, 2009; 5. "Paparazzi" Released: July 6, 2009

The Fame is the debut studio album by the American singer-songwriter Lady Gaga. It was released on August 19, 2008, by Interscope Records. After joining KonLive Distribution and Cherrytree Records in 2008, Gaga began working on the album with different producers, primarily RedOne, Martin Kierszenbaum, and Rob Fusari. Musically, The Fame is an electropop, synth-pop, and dance-pop record that displays influences from 1980s music. Lyrically, it explores Gaga's interest in fame while also dealing with subjects such as love, sex, money, drugs, and sexual identity. The album was primarily promoted through The Fame Ball Tour and multiple television appearances, and was reissued as a deluxe edition with The Fame Monster on November 18, 2009.

On release, The Fame received generally favorable reviews from critics, who commended its lyrical content, Gaga's musicianship, and vocal ability. The first two singles from the album, "Just Dance" and "Poker Face", gained international success, topping the charts in several countries worldwide including the United States, the United Kingdom, and Australia. The subsequent singles, "LoveGame" and "Paparazzi", were commercial successes as well, charting within the top-ten of over ten countries worldwide. "Eh, Eh (Nothing Else I Can Say)" had a limited single release in Australia, New Zealand, and select European countries, where it became a modest success, while "Beautiful, Dirty, Rich" served as a promotional single. The title track and "Starstruck" (featuring Space Cowboy and Flo Rida) also charted.

The Fame charted at number one in Austria, Canada, Germany, Ireland, Poland, Scotland, South Africa, Switzerland, and the United Kingdom. In the United States, The Fame topped the Dance/Electronic Albums chart for 193 nonconsecutive weeks, the most time on top in history. It has been certified diamond in France and multi-platinum in Australia, Austria, Belgium, Brazil, Canada, Chile, Denmark, Germany, Hungary, Ireland, Italy, New Zealand, the Philippines, Poland, Singapore, Switzerland, the United Kingdom, and the United States. The Fame became the fifth best-selling album of 2009, and has sold over 4.9 million copies in the United States as of January 2019. Worldwide, the album has sold over 15 million copies, making it one of the best-selling albums of the 21st century.

The Fame has won multiple awards since its release. The album was nominated for a total of five Grammy Awards at the 52nd Annual Grammy Awards, including Album of the Year. It won Best Electronic/Dance Album and Best Dance Recording for its single "Poker Face", and also won Best International Album at the 2010 Brit Awards. The album helped kick-start the late-2000s and early-2010s era of recession pop, alongside artists such as Kesha and Katy Perry. In 2013 and 2022, Rolling Stone named The Fame as one of the "100 Greatest Debut Albums of All-Time". As of 2023, it is the 12th biggest album of all time on the US Billboard 200.

== Background and development ==
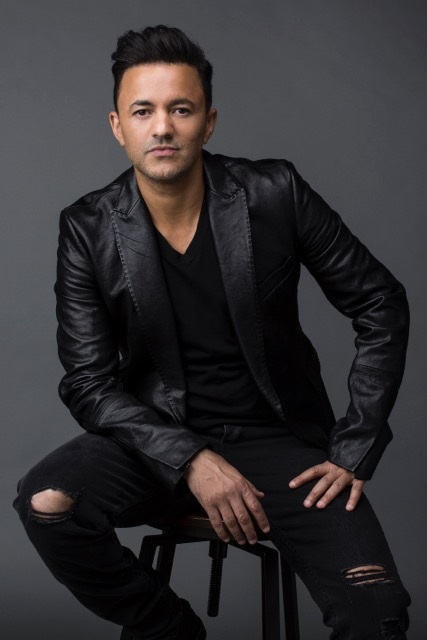
RedOne (pictured in 2017) produced a large portion of The Fame.

While establishing herself as an artist and working her way up through the New York underground club scene, Lady Gaga released her debut studio album, The Fame. Speaking about the title and concept of the album, Gaga explained: "The Fame is about how anyone can feel famous. ... Pop culture is art. It doesn't make you cool to hate pop culture, so I embraced it and you hear it all over The Fame. But, it's a sharable fame. I want to invite you all to the party. I want people to feel a part of this lifestyle." Gaga stated in an interview with MTV UK that she had been working on the album for two and a half years and completed half of it during the first week of January 2008. In addition to writing the lyrics, Gaga worked on the melodies and synth work of the album, with record producer RedOne. According to Gaga, the first track "Just Dance" is a joyous, heart-themed song, which appeals to people going through tough times in their life. "LoveGame", the second track, was inspired by Gaga's sexual attraction to a stranger in a nightclub to whom she said, "I wanna ride on your disco stick". It was written in four minutes based on the disco stick hook. "Paparazzi" has been interpreted with different meanings. However, Gaga explained in an interview with About.com that the song was inspired by her struggles and hunger for fame and love. Essentially a love song, "Paparazzi" dealt with enticing the media and asked whether someone can have both fame and love.

"Poker Face" was inspired by Gaga's boyfriends who enjoyed gambling, and also dealt with her personal experience of bisexuality; her fantasies about women while having sex with men, thus representing her 'poker face'." "Boys Boys Boys" was inspired by the similarly titled Mötley Crüe song "Girls, Girls, Girls". Gaga explained that she wanted a female version of the song that rockers would like too. "Beautiful, Dirty, Rich" summed up her time of self-discovery, living on the Lower East Side and dabbling in drugs and the party scene. "Eh, Eh (Nothing Else I Can Say)" was about breaking up with a boyfriend and finding someone new. "Brown Eyes" was inspired by the British rock band Queen and, according to Gaga, is the most vulnerable song on the album.

Gaga further clarified the ideas behind The Fame, and her inspirations and visions for the album. She believed that the most important thing missing from pop music at the time was the combination of the visual imagery of the artist with the music. Gaga incorporated theatrics in her live performances of the songs from the album. Hence she hoped that people would take notice of the performance art, which she was trying to bring back with the album and its music; according to her, the music put the lifestyle in front of it.

"I just feel like this record is really different- you[']ve got club bangers to more 70s glam to more singer-songwriter records to rock music. ... The Fame is not about who you are—it's about how everybody wants to know who you are! Buy it and listen to it before you go out or in the car. ... I think you've really got to allow artists' creativity to marinate. It took me a while but really delving into myself I finally got it. I couldn't be more proud of it. It's not just a record[,] it's a whole pop art movement[.] It's not just about one song."

== Composition ==
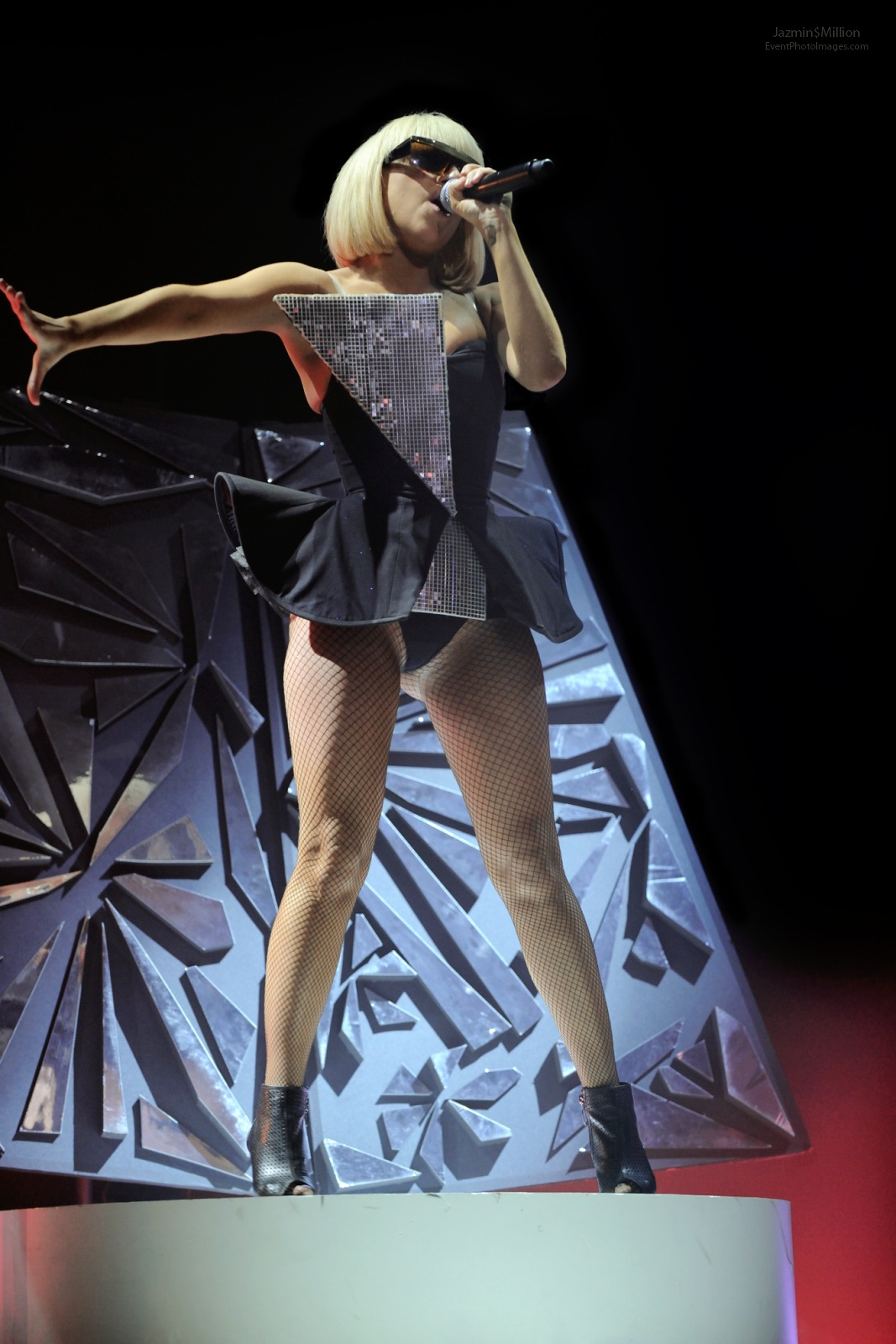
Lady Gaga performing "Paparazzi" on The Fame Ball Tour. The song talks about the desire of capturing attention.

Musically, the album combines electropop, synth-pop, and dance-pop, while drawing influences from 1980s music. Songs like "Poker Face", "Just Dance" and "LoveGame" are uptempo dance songs, with "Poker Face" carrying a dark sound with clear vocals on the chorus and a pop hook. "Just Dance" is synth-based, while "LoveGame" has a more dance-oriented beat, and "Money Honey" has a moderate techno groove. All of them combine clipped marching beats, sawing electronics, and restrained R&B-infused beats. "Paparazzi" carries a sultry beat while "Summerboy" draws influence from the music of Blondie. Both "Starstruck" and "Paper Gangsta" feature auto-tuned vocals by Gaga. The former is a bass-heavy R&B track, while the latter is hip-hop and showcases Gaga blending half-rap and half-sung verses. The title track, "The Fame", showcases guitar riffs reminiscent of David Bowie's style. "Disco Heaven" is "disco pastiche", "Again Again" is "bluesy piano-rock", while "Retro, Dance, Freak" is a Prince-inspired track. "Eh, Eh (Nothing Else I Can Say)" is a slower tempo, bubblegum-pop track with a 1980s synth-pop feel to it. "Brown Eyes" is a piano ballad that was compared to music by Bowie and Queen.

Lyrically, many of the songs on The Fame talk about being famous and achieving popularity. The title track has been described as a "tongue-in-cheek ode to hedonism", and "a mission statement and declaration of self for early Gaga". "LoveGame" portrays a message about love, fame and sexuality. "Paparazzi" portrays a stalker who is following somebody being their biggest fan. The lyrics also portray the desire to capture the attention of the camera as well as achieving fame. Gaga explained that,

"This idea of The Fame runs through and through. Basically, if you have nothing—no money, no fame—you can still feel beautiful and dirty rich. It's about making choices, and having references—things you pull from your life that you believe in. It's about self-discovery and being creative. The record is slightly focused, but it's also eclectic. ... The music is intended to inspire people to feel a certain way about themselves, so they'll be able to encompass, in their own lives, a sense of inner fame that they can project to the world, and the carefree nature of the album is a reflection of that aura. I like to funnel interesting ideas to the rest of the world through a pop lens."

"Just Dance" talks about being intoxicated at a party, with lyrics like "What's going on on the floor? / I love this record, baby but I can't see straight anymore". "Poker Face" is about sexual innuendo and teasing. Gaga explained to the Daily Star that the lyrics carry a bit of an undertone of confusion about love and sex. According to the BBC, the "Mum-mum-mum-mah" hook used in the song is sampled from Boney M.'s 1977 hit "Ma Baker". "I Like it Rough" was described as "kink bop". The album's "Brown Eyes" is a breakup song where, instead of expressing tenderness, Gaga delivers the lyrics with a raw, almost defiant tone, even calling it "just a silly song about you". In "Eh, Eh (Nothing Else I Can Say)", Gaga gently parts ways with a former lover.

== Promotion ==
=== Singles ===
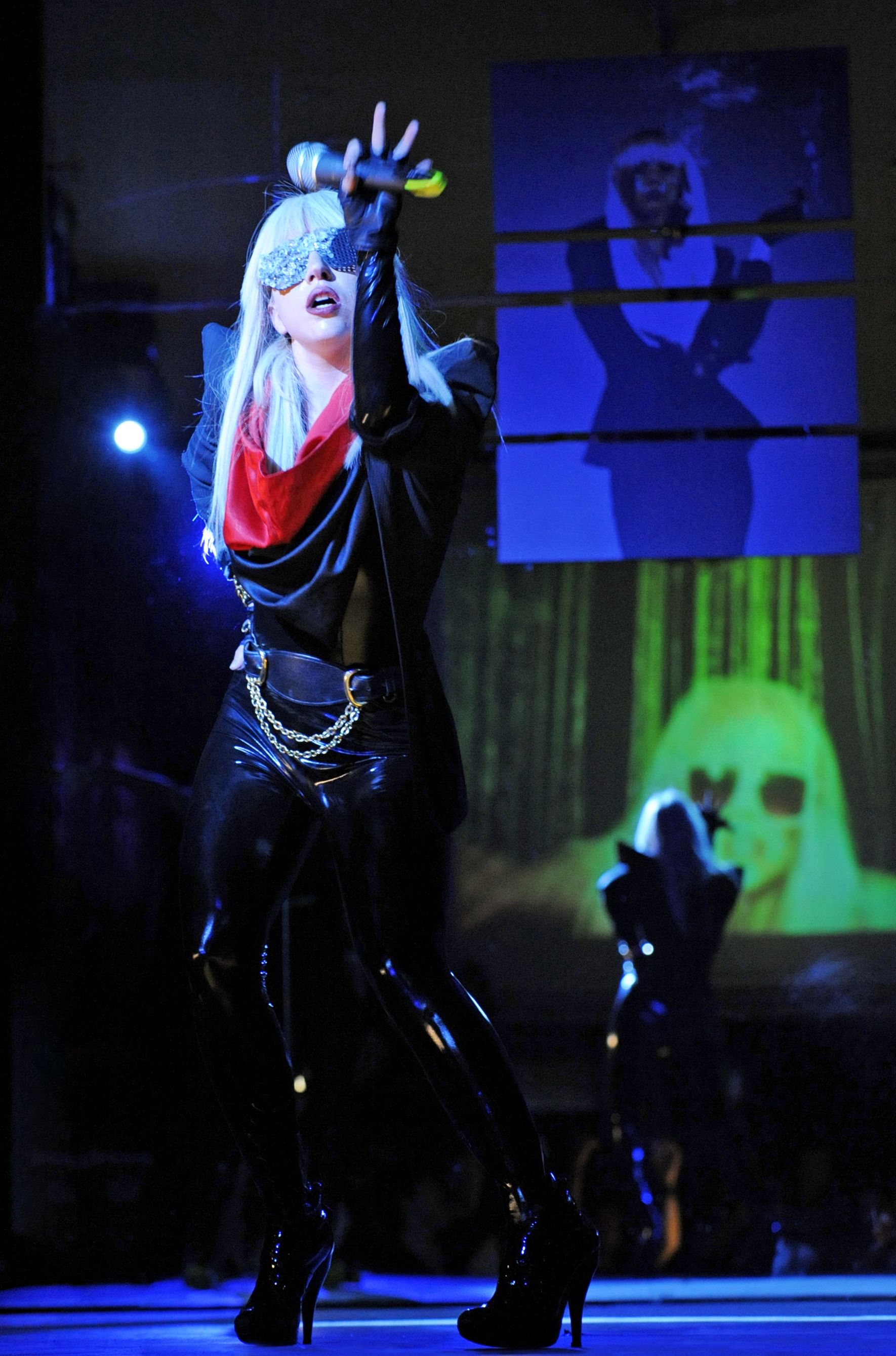
Gaga performing the lead single, "Just Dance" in a Montreal club. Before embarking on her first tour, Gaga had performed songs from the album in several small clubs.

"Just Dance" was released as the album's lead single worldwide on June 17, 2008, through digital distribution. The song was critically acclaimed with reviewers praising its club-anthem quality and the synth-pop associated with it. It achieved commercial success by topping charts in the United States, Australia, Canada, the Republic of Ireland, the Netherlands and the United Kingdom, as well as reaching the top 10 in 16 other countries. The song received a Grammy nomination in the Best Dance Recording category but lost to electronic duo Daft Punk for their song "Harder, Better, Faster, Stronger".

"Poker Face" was released as the second single from the album. It was also well received by critics, most of whom praised the robotic hook and the chorus. The single achieved greater success than "Just Dance" by topping the charts in nearly every country where it was released. "Poker Face" became Gaga's second consecutive number one on the Hot 100. On December 2, 2009, "Poker Face" received three Grammy nominations in the categories of Song of the Year, Record of the Year, and won for Best Dance Recording.

"Eh, Eh (Nothing Else I Can Say)" was the album's third single in Australia, New Zealand, Sweden and Denmark and fourth in France. The song received mixed reviews. Some critics compared it to nineties Europop while others criticized it for bringing the party-like nature of the album to a halt. It failed to match the success of the previous singles in Australia and New Zealand by reaching 15 and nine, respectively. It peaked at two in Sweden and at seven in France.

"LoveGame" was released as the third single in the United States, Canada and some European nations. It was the fourth single in Australia, New Zealand, and the United Kingdom. The song was critically appreciated for its catchy tune and the "I wanna take a ride on your disco stick" hook. The song has reached the top 10 in countries such as the United States, Australia and Canada and the top 20 in others.

"Paparazzi" was announced as the third single in the United Kingdom and Ireland with a release date of July 6, 2009, the fourth single in the United States, and the fifth single overall. The song reached the top five in Australia, Canada, Ireland and the United Kingdom. It also reached the top 10 in the United States. The song received critical acclaim for its playful, club-friendly style and is deemed the most memorable and telling song from the album. The associated music video for the song was shot as a mini-movie with Gaga starring as a doomed starlet who is almost killed by her boyfriend, but in the end takes her revenge and reclaims her fame and popularity.

"Beautiful, Dirty, Rich" was initially announced as Gaga's second single. However, "Poker Face" was chosen instead, and the song was released as a promotional single only. The song charted on the UK Singles Chart from digital downloads and spent three weeks on the charts, peaking at number 83. To celebrate the launch of the show Dirty Sexy Money, ABC created a music video of Gaga's song "Beautiful, Dirty, Rich", directed by Melina Matsoukas. There were two videos released for the song – the first version, which was composed of clips from the show and the second version, being the official music video. In 2010, during a live performance of "Speechless", Gaga revealed that her label discouraged her from writing an immediate follow-up to The Fame in 2009, and instead wanted her to prolong the album's success by releasing "Boys Boys Boys" as a single. She refused and stated her belief in her new material, which eventually became The Fame Monster (2009).

=== Live performances and media appearances ===
To promote the album, Gaga gave several performances worldwide. Her first televised appearance was on Logo's NewNowNext Awards on June 7, 2008. She also performed on Michalsky StyleNite at Berlin Fashion Week, So You Think You Can Dance, Jimmy Kimmel Live!, The Tonight Show with Jay Leno, as well as in Vietnam for the 57th Miss Universe beauty pageant during the swimsuit competition. On January 31, 2009, she performed on television in Ireland on RTÉ One's show Tubridy Tonight. Three songs from The Fame were used in the second season of The CW's series Gossip Girl: "Paparazzi" in the episode "Summer, Kind of Wonderful", "Poker Face" in "The Serena Also Rises", and "Money Honey" in "Remains of the J". Gaga also performed "Poker Face" on American Idol on April 1, 2009.

At the 2009 MTV Video Music Awards, Gaga gave a performance of "Paparazzi". Her performance involved choreographed dance moves, playing on the piano, theatrical blood dripping from her ribcage, and ended with the singer hung lifeless with one hand rising above her dancers and blood smeared on her face. It is widely considered to be one of Gaga's most acclaimed performances, and according to Billboard's Ashley Laderer, "this was the performance that really made Lady Gaga. It proved she was more than just a superficial pop star—she was an artist".

=== Tour ===
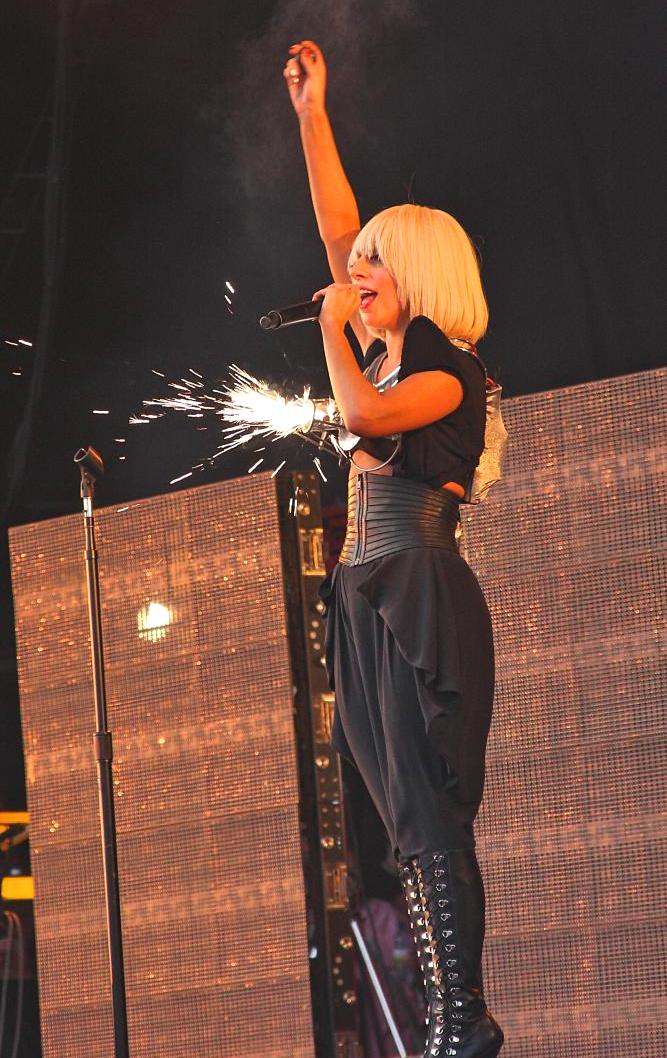
Gaga singing "Eh, Eh (Nothing Else I Can Say)" at the 2009 Glastonbury Festival as part of her headlining Fame Ball Tour, which visited festivals and concert venues around the world

In addition to opening select shows on New Kids on the Block's 2008 tour and The Pussycat Dolls' 2009 Doll Domination Tour, Gaga embarked on her first headlining concert tour, The Fame Ball Tour, to promote the album. It started on March 12, 2009, in San Diego, California. It was Gaga's first concert tour with North American shows in March, followed by dates in Oceania and a solo trek through Europe. Dates in Asia soon followed, along with two performances at England's V Festival and two shows in North America that had been postponed from April. Gaga described the tour as a traveling museum show incorporating artist Andy Warhol's pop-performance art concept. Tickets were also distributed for charity. Alternate versions of the show with minimal variations were planned by Gaga to accommodate different venues.

The show consisted of four segments, with each segment being followed by a video interlude to the next segment, and it ended with an encore. The set list consisted of songs from The Fame only. An alternate set list with minor changes was performed for European dates. Gaga appeared on the stage in new costumes including an innovative dress made entirely of plastic bubbles, and premiered an unreleased song called "Future Love", which she described as an "endorsement to same-sex marriage".

The show received positive reviews, with critics praising Gaga's vocal clarity and fashion sense as well as her ability to pull off theatrics like a professional artist. In June 2009, Gaga delivered an hour-long set at the Glastonbury Festival, as part of the tour. Will Dean of The Guardian wrote that she "didn't disappoint", praising "her dancing, bizarre mid-song banter and costumes (including a boob flamethrower!)" for offering as much entertainment as the music.

== Critical reception ==
Professional ratings
Aggregate scores
Source	Rating
AnyDecentMusic?	6.1/10
Metacritic	71/100
Review scores
Source	Rating
AllMusic	4.5/5 stars
The A.V. Club	B−
The Boston Phoenix	3/4 stars
Entertainment Weekly	B−
The Guardian	3/5 stars
The Irish Times	3/5 stars
PopMatters	7/10
The Rolling Stone Album Guide	3.5/5 stars
The Sunday Times	3/5 stars
URB	3.5/5 stars

The Fame received generally positive reviews from music critics. At Metacritic, which assigns a normalized rating out of 100 to reviews from mainstream critics, the album received an average score of 71, based on 13 reviews. AllMusic editor Stephen Thomas Erlewine called the album "music that sounds thickly sexy with its stainless steel synths and dark disco rhythms", and wrote that it is "glorious pop trash and a wicked parody of it". Nicole Powers of URB praised its "irony-laden lyrics, delivered in a style that owes a little something to Gwen Stefani", as well as the album's "deluxe ditties". Mikael Wood of Entertainment Weekly called it "remarkably (and exhaustingly) pure in its vision of a world in which nothing trumps being beautiful, dirty, and rich. In this economy, though, her high-times escapism has its charms".

Alexis Petridis of The Guardian found it "packing an immensely addictive melody or an inescapable hook, virtually everything sounds like another hit single", and predicted that it "certainly sounds like it could be big". Daniel Brockman from The Boston Phoenix wrote that "Gaga ups the ante in terms of catchy songwriting and sheer high-in-the-club-banging-to-the-beat abandon." Ben Hogwood of musicOMH praised Gaga's "blend of sassy attitude, metallic beats and sharp, incisive songwriting", elements which he felt are integral to "creating pop music".

Although he panned "Eh, Eh (Nothing Else I Can Say)", "Paper Gangsta", and "Brown Eyes", Evan Sawdey of PopMatters called The Fame "a solid dance album" and wrote that "much of the album's success can be attributed to rising club producer RedOne". Joey Guerra from the Houston Chronicle felt that although the songs present in the album are not innovative, Gaga deserved credit for bringing real dance music to the mass. Genevieve Koski of The A.V. Club felt that the "whole point" of the album is "glitter-laced, dance-inciting energy that bodes well for extended club play". Slant Magazine's Sal Cinquemani viewed that Gaga's lyrics veer between "cheap" and "nonsensical drivel", while her singing is "uneven at best". He added that the highlights such as "Poker Face", "Starstruck", "Paper Gangsta", and "Summerboy" rely "almost solely on their snappy production and sing-along hooks".

Freedom du Lac from The Washington Post criticized the album for lacking originality. MSN Music's Robert Christgau gave the album an "honorable mention" and quippedly referred to it as "shallowness at its most principled". The Fame garnered five Grammy nominations at the 52nd Annual Grammy Awards on December 2, 2009. The album itself was nominated for Album of the Year and won Best Electronic/Dance Album. It also won Best International Album at the 2010 Brit Awards. In 2013 and 2022, Rolling Stone named The Fame as one of the "100 Greatest Debut Albums of All-Time". In 2025, Billboard named The Fame the tenth best album of the first quarter of the 21st century, based on its performance on the weekly Billboard 200 chart. The album accumulated a total of 396 weeks on the chart during the first 25 years of the century and remained on the Billboard 200 every year from 2008 to 2012, and again from 2016 to 2024. It is also the highest-charting debut album on the list and the fourth highest among works by female artists.

== Commercial performance ==
In the United States, The Fame debuted at number 17 on the Billboard 200 with sales of 24,000 on the issue dated November 15, 2008. After fluctuating down the charts, the album reached number 10 on the issue dated March 7, 2009. The album also topped Billboard's Dance/Electronic Albums chart; it has stayed at the number-one spot for 193 nonconsecutive weeks, as of week of May 24, 2025, and holds the record for the most time on top in the chart's history. In March 2020, the album was certified six-times Platinum for shipments of six million copies, by the Recording Industry Association of America (RIAA). With the release of The Fame Monster, which was also combined with The Fame as a deluxe edition, the album jumped from 34 to 6 on the Billboard 200 with sales of 151,000. It reached its highest sales week on the issue dated January 9, 2010 with 169,000 copies sold. On the issue dated January 16, 2010, The Fame moved to a new peak of two on the Billboard 200 after being on the charts for 62 weeks. By the end of 2009, The Fame became the fifth best-selling album of the year.

The Fame has sold 4.9 million copies in the United States as of March 2019 and is the seventh best-selling digital album, selling 1.086 million digital copies. Including equivalent album units, The Fame has sold 8.8 million in the country. It was ranked at number 12 on the Billboard Top 200 Albums of All Time list. Following Gaga's Super Bowl LI halftime show performance, The Fame re-entered the Billboard 200 at number 6, selling 17,000 copies and 38,000 total album-equivalent units. It has spent over 400 weeks on the chart.

In Canada, the album reached number-one, and has been certified seven times platinum by Music Canada for shipment of 560,000 copies. It had sold 476,000 copies as of March 2011. The album debuted at number six, and peaked at number two in New Zealand as well as being certified double platinum. In Australia, the album debuted at number 12 and peaked at number three. The album has been certified sextuple platinum in Australia, by the Australian Recording Industry Association (ARIA) for shipments of 420,000 copies.

The Fame debuted in the United Kingdom at number three with first week sales of 25,228 copies. After spending 10 weeks in the top 10, it replaced Ronan Keating's Songs for My Mother at the top position. Since then, the album spent four consecutive weeks at the number-one spot. It has since been certified twelve-times platinum by the British Phonographic Industry (BPI), and has sold 3 million copies as of October 2018. It also became the first album to reach the platinum certification based on digital sales after selling 300,000 units in the UK. The album is the ninth best-selling album in the UK of the 21st century, and the 31st best-selling album in UK chart history.

In France, The Fame debuted at number 73 and peaked at number two for five weeks. It has been certified triple diamond by the Syndicat National de l'Édition Phonographique (SNEP) and, as of February 2012, has sold 630,000 copies. In Ireland, the album entered the charts at number-eight, and in its fifth week climbed to number-one for two consecutive weeks. In mainland Europe, the album peaked at number one on the European Top 100 Albums, the Austrian Albums Chart and the German Album Chart. In Germany, it became the fourth most downloaded album ever. It also reached the top 20 in Mexico, Belgium, the Czech Republic, Denmark, Finland, Greece, Hungary, Italy, the Netherlands, Norway, Poland, Russia, and Switzerland. Internationally, the album has sold over 15 million copies as of 2016.

== Legacy ==
With the release of The Fame, Gaga was credited for reviving electronic dance music during the late 2000s on radio. Jonathan Bogart from The Atlantic stated, "EDM came in by no back door but right through the front gate, with Lady Gaga's 'Just Dance' in 2008" and that "the sound didn't take long to spread". DJ Tommie Sunshine told MTV that "there wouldn't be a David Guetta top 10 hit... there wouldn't be this Black Eyed Peas record, if it wasn't for The Fame. The influence of that record is epic, and we are hearing talking about all of this because of that." St. Louis Post-Dispatch's journalist Kevin C. Johnson with his article "Lady Gaga helps bring EDM to the masses", acknowledged the impact. In the article, Rob Lemon said Gaga "definitely has had influence" and that she "is exposing people to the music, and anybody exposing people to it is part of the machine".

Radio personality Zane Lowe and record producer/DJ Calvin Harris addressed the impact of the album in a Beats 1 radio interview. Lowe stated: "Mike Skinner told me this, cause we were having a debate about Lady Gaga and he was like 'One thing you gotta remember about Lady Gaga, she put four-on-the-floor back on American radio'" and that "up until that moment there was nothing resembling four-on-the-floor in pop music". Harris added: "A 100%. They even had a hip-hop version of 'Poker Face', for radio" and that "it was the 4/4 one that hit, and then it just went ridiculous." In 2020, Stephen Daw from Billboard stated that "The Fame not only changed the course of Gaga's career, but corrected the course of modern pop music for generations to come."

== The Fame Monster ==
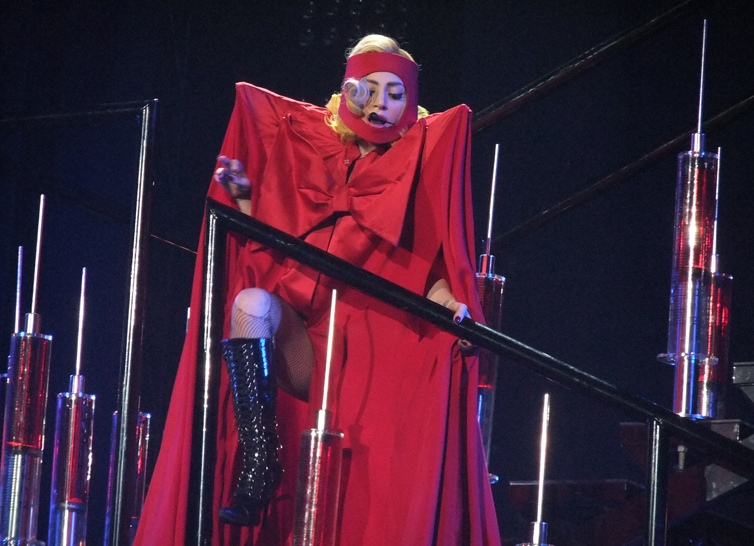
Gaga performing The Fame's title track on The Monster Ball Tour, which was in support of the album's reissue

The Fame Monster is a reissue of The Fame, released on November 18, 2009. Initially planned solely as a part of the deluxe edition of The Fame, Interscope later decided to release the eight new songs as a standalone EP in selected territories. The decision was also due to Gaga believing the re-release was too expensive and that the albums were conceptually different, describing them as yin and yang. The deluxe edition of the album contains The Fame in its entirety on a second disc along with The Fame Monster. The album deals with the darker side of fame, as experienced by Gaga over the course of 2008–09 while traveling around the world, and expressed through a monster metaphor. The two album covers were shot by Hedi Slimane. One of the covers has a gothic look and was initially declined by her record company, but Gaga persuaded them otherwise. The composition takes its inspiration from Gothic music and fashion shows.

Music critics gave the album mostly positive reviews, with many praising the songs "Bad Romance", "Telephone", "Dance in the Dark", and "Monster". In some countries the album charted together with The Fame while in others like the United States, Canada and Japan, it charted as a separate album. It reached the top 10 in most major markets. Gaga embarked on her second headlining tour, The Monster Ball, in support of the album, which started on November 27, 2009, in Montreal, Canada, and finished on May 6, 2011, in Mexico City, Mexico.

== Track listing ==
The Fame track listing
No.	Title	Writer(s)	Producer(s)	Length
1.	"Just Dance" (featuring Colby O'Donis)	Lady Gaga; RedOne; Aliaune Thiam	RedOne	4:02
2.	"LoveGame"	Gaga; RedOne	RedOne	3:36
3.	"Paparazzi"	Gaga; Rob Fusari	Fusari; Gaga^{[a]}	3:28
4.	"Poker Face"	Gaga; RedOne	RedOne	3:57
5.	"Eh, Eh (Nothing Else I Can Say)"	Gaga; Martin Kierszenbaum	Kierszenbaum	2:57
6.	"Beautiful, Dirty, Rich"	Gaga; Fusari	Fusari	2:53
7.	"The Fame"	Gaga; Kierszenbaum	Kierszenbaum	3:42
8.	"Money Honey"	Gaga; RedOne; Bilal Hajji	RedOne	2:50
9.	"Starstruck" (featuring Space Cowboy and Flo Rida)	Gaga; Kierszenbaum; Nick Dresti; Tramar Dillard	Kierszenbaum; Space Cowboy	3:37
10.	"Boys Boys Boys"	Gaga; RedOne	RedOne	3:20
11.	"Paper Gangsta"	Gaga; RedOne	RedOne	4:23
12.	"Brown Eyes"	Gaga; Fusari	Fusari; Gaga^{[a]}	4:03
13.	"I Like It Rough"	Gaga; Kierszenbaum	Kierszenbaum	3:22
14.	"Summerboy"	Gaga; Brian Kierulf; Josh Schwartz	Brian & Josh	4:13
Total length:				50:20

10th anniversary USB bonus tracks
No.	Title	Writer(s)	Producer(s)	Length
15.	"Disco Heaven"	Gaga; Fusari; Tom Kafafian	Fusari	3:41
16.	"Again Again"	Gaga; Fusari	Fusari	3:05
17.	"Retro, Dance, Freak"	Gaga; Fusari	Fusari	3:23
Total length:				60:45

=== Notes ===
- ^{^[a]} signifies an additional co-producer
- Original international edition included the track "Again Again", featured alternate mixes of "LoveGame" and "Money Honey", and had a different track order. Track list was revised to its final form by removing "Again Again", adding "Starstruck" and "Paper Gangsta", "Beautiful, Dirty, Rich" and "Poker Face" switching places, and standardizing mixes.
- UK, Irish and Japanese editions reordered "I Like It Rough" before and "Starstruck" after "Eh, Eh (Nothing Else I Can Say)".
- "Disco Heaven" was initially available exclusively on the International and US iTunes Store editions.
- After its initial track list appearance, "Again Again" was made available exclusively on the UK, Irish and Japanese edition.
- "Retro Dance Freak" was initially available exclusively on the Japanese edition.
- Germany Saturn limited edition includes the piano and voice version of "Poker Face", the stripped down version of "Just Dance", the electric piano and human beat box version of "Eh, Eh (Nothing Else I Can Say)", and "Again Again".
- Japanese deluxe edition includes a DVD which features the music videos of "Just Dance", "Poker Face", "Eh, Eh (Nothing Else I Can Say)", "LoveGame", and "Paparazzi".
- USB edition includes a live piano & voice version of "Poker Face", several remixes of "Eh, Eh (Nothing Else I Can Say)", "Just Dance", "LoveGame", "Paparazzi", and "The Fame", the holiday track "Christmas Tree", the bonus track "Retro Dance Freak" and four music videos.
- 10th anniversary USB edition also includes the tracks of The Fame Monster, eight music videos and an EPK.

== Personnel ==
Personnel adapted from The Fame liner notes.

- Akon – background vocals
- Victor Bailey – bass guitar
- Vicki Boyd – A&R coordinator
- Troy Carter – management
- Lisa Einhorn-Gilder – production coordinator
- Flo Rida – rapping
- Rob Fusari – production, co-executive producer
- Calvin "Sci-Fidelty" Gaines – programming, bass guitar
- Gene Grimaldi – mastering
- Vincent Herbert – executive producer, A&R
- Pieter Henket – photography
- Atelier 99 – retouching, photograph manipulation
- Tom Kafafian – guitar
- Dyana Kass – marketing director
- Martin Kierszenbaum – production, A&R
- Brian Kierulf – production, arrangement
- Lady Gaga – lead and background vocals, production, piano, synthesizers, keys
- Leah Landon – management
- Candice Lawler – photography
- Dave Murga – drums
- Colby O'Donis – vocals, background vocals
- Robert Orton – mixing
- Jennifer Paola – A&R admin
- RedOne – production, instruments, programming, recording, background vocals, co-executive producer
- Andrea Ruffalo – A&R coordinator
- Dave Russell – engineering
- Warwick Saint – photography
- Joshua M. Schwartz – production, arrangement
- Space Cowboy – production, vocals
- Joe Tomino – drums
- Tony Ugval – engineering
- Liam Ward – design

== Charts ==
=== Weekly charts ===
Weekly chart performance
Chart (2008–2024)	Peak position
Australian Albums (ARIA)	3
Austrian Albums (Ö3 Austria)	1
Belgian Albums (Ultratop Flanders)	4
Belgian Albums (Ultratop Wallonia)	8
Brazilian Albums (ABPD)	15
Canadian Albums (Billboard)	1
Czech Albums (ČNS IFPI)	2
Danish Albums (Hitlisten)	2
Dutch Albums (Album Top 100)	12
European Albums (Billboard)	1
Finnish Albums (Suomen virallinen lista)	3
French Albums (SNEP)	2
German Albums (Offizielle Top 100)	1
Greek Albums (IFPI)	2
Hungarian Albums (MAHASZ)	2
Irish Albums (IRMA)	1
Italian Albums (FIMI)	13
Japanese Albums (Oricon)	6
Lithuanian Albums (AGATA)	57
Mexican Albums (Top 100 Mexico)	2
New Zealand Albums (RMNZ)	2
Norwegian Albums (VG-lista)	4
Polish Albums (ZPAV)	1
Portuguese Albums (AFP)	3
Russian Albums (2M)	5
Scottish Albums (Official Charts)	1
South African Albums (RISA)	1
Spanish Albums (Promusicae)	3
Swedish Albums (Sverigetopplistan)	15
Swiss Albums (Schweizer Hitparade)	1
Taiwan International Albums (G-Music)	2
UK Albums (Official Charts)	1
US Billboard 200	2
US Top Dance Albums (Billboard)	1
US Indie Store Album Sales (Billboard)	1

=== Decade-end charts ===
Decade-end chart performance
Chart (2000–09)	Position
Australian Albums (ARIA)	89
UK Albums (Official Charts)	73
US Dance/Electronic Albums (Billboard)	3

Decade-end chart performance
Chart (2010–19)	Position
Germany (Official German Charts)	48
UK Albums (Official Charts)	15
US Billboard 200	31
US Dance/Electronic Albums (Billboard)	1

=== Year-end charts ===
Year-end chart performance
Chart (2008)	Position
Australian Dance Albums (ARIA)	3
New Zealand Albums (RMNZ)	20
US Top Dance/Electronic Albums (Billboard)	18

Year-end chart performance
Chart (2009)	Position
Australian Albums (ARIA)	9
Australian Dance Albums (ARIA)	1
Austrian Albums (Ö3 Austria)	2
Belgian Albums (Ultratop Flanders)	8
Belgian Albums (Ultratop Wallonia)	36
Canadian Albums (Billboard)	3
Danish Albums (Hitlisten)	10
Dutch Albums (Album Top 100)	24
European Albums (Billboard)	1
Finnish Albums (Suomen virallinen lista)	4
French Albums (SNEP)	22
German Albums (Offizielle Top 100)	4
Hungarian Albums (MAHASZ)	6
Irish Albums (IRMA)	3
Italian Albums (FIMI)	82
Japanese Albums (Oricon)	42
Mexican Albums (Top 100 Mexico)	10
New Zealand Albums (RMNZ)	3
Polish Albums (ZPAV)	70
Swedish Albums (Sverigetopplistan)	56
Swiss Albums (Schweizer Hitparade)	2
UK Albums (Official Charts)	2
US Billboard 200	8
US Digital Albums (Billboard)	4
US Top Dance/Electronic Albums (Billboard)	1
Worldwide Albums (IFPI)	5

Year-end chart performance
Chart (2010)	Position
Australian Dance Albums (ARIA)	14
Austrian Albums (Ö3 Austria)	1
Brazil Albums (Pro-Música Brasil)	3
Canadian Albums (Billboard)	3
European Albums (Billboard)	1
German Albums (Offizielle Top 100)	3
Hungarian Albums (MAHASZ)	3
Japanese Albums (Oricon)	14
Mexican Albums (Top 100 Mexico)	5
Spanish Albums (PROMUSICAE)	16
Swiss Albums (Schweizer Hitparade)	1
UK Albums (Official Charts)	3
US Billboard 200	4
US Digital Albums (Billboard)	2
US Top Dance/Electronic Albums (Billboard)	1

Year-end chart performance
Chart (2011)	Position
Australian Dance Albums (ARIA)	11
Austrian Albums (Ö3 Austria)	68
Hungarian Albums (MAHASZ)	34
Japan Hot Albums (Billboard Japan)	74
Japanese Albums (Oricon)	86
Mexican Albums (Top 100 Mexico)	91
Swiss Albums (Schweizer Hitparade)	66
UK Albums (Official Charts)	30
US Billboard 200	56
US Top Dance/Electronic Albums (Billboard)	3

Year-end chart performance
Chart (2012)	Position
UK Albums (Official Charts)	147

Year-end chart performance
Chart (2017)	Position
Australian Dance Albums (ARIA)	39
US Billboard 200	157
US Catalog Albums (Billboard)	40
US Top Dance/Electronic Albums (Billboard)	4

Year-end chart performance
Chart (2018)	Position
Australian Dance Albums (ARIA)	15
US Top Dance/Electronic Albums (Billboard)	4

Year-end chart performance
Chart (2019)	Position
Australian Dance Albums (ARIA)	8
Belgian Albums (Ultratop Flanders)	190
US Top Dance/Electronic Albums (Billboard)	2

Year-end chart performance
Chart (2020)	Position
Australian Albums (ARIA)	97
Australian Dance Albums (ARIA)	2
Belgian Albums (Ultratop Flanders)	102
Belgian Albums (Ultratop Wallonia)	164
US Top Dance/Electronic Albums (Billboard)	2

Year-end chart performance
Chart (2021)	Position
Australian Albums (ARIA)	90
Australian Dance Albums (ARIA)	1
Belgian Albums (Ultratop Flanders)	62
Belgian Albums (Ultratop Wallonia)	122
US Top Dance/Electronic Albums (Billboard)	1

Year-end chart performance
Chart (2022)	Position
Australian Albums (ARIA)	63
Australian Dance Albums (ARIA)	1
Austrian Albums (Ö3 Austria)	58
Belgian Albums (Ultratop Flanders)	61
Belgian Albums (Ultratop Wallonia)	99
Swiss Albums (Schweizer Hitparade)	87
UK Albums (Official Charts)	88
US Billboard 200	158
US Top Dance/Electronic Albums (Billboard)	2

Year-end chart performance
Chart (2023)	Position
Australian Albums (ARIA)	59
Australian Dance Albums (ARIA)	1
Austrian Albums (Ö3 Austria)	49
Belgian Albums (Ultratop Flanders)	49
Belgian Albums (Ultratop Wallonia)	61
Dutch Albums (Album Top 100)	66
German Albums (Offizielle Top 100)	90
Hungarian Albums (MAHASZ)	69
Swiss Albums (Schweizer Hitparade)	31
UK Albums (Official Charts)	63
US Billboard 200	111
US Top Dance/Electronic Albums (Billboard)	3

Year-end chart performance
Chart (2024)	Position
Australian Albums (ARIA)	60
Australian Dance Albums (ARIA)	2
Austrian Albums (Ö3 Austria)	30
Belgian Albums (Ultratop Flanders)	40
Belgian Albums (Ultratop Wallonia)	42
Dutch Albums (Album Top 100)	54
German Albums (Offizielle Top 100)	38
Hungarian Albums (MAHASZ)	40
Swiss Albums (Schweizer Hitparade)	22
UK Albums (Official Charts)	66
US Billboard 200	121
US Top Dance/Electronic Albums (Billboard)	2

Year-end chart performance
Chart (2025)	Position
Australian Albums (ARIA)	53
Australian Dance Albums (ARIA)	3
Austrian Albums (Ö3 Austria)	16
Belgian Albums (Ultratop Flanders)	23
Belgian Albums (Ultratop Wallonia)	34
Dutch Albums (Album Top 100)	32
German Albums (Offizielle Top 100)	23
Hungarian Albums (MAHASZ)	26
Swiss Albums (Schweizer Hitparade)	12
UK Albums (Official Charts)	46
US Billboard 200	91
US Top Dance Albums (Billboard)	3

== Certifications and sales ==
Certifications and sales
Region	Certification	Certified units/sales
Australia (ARIA)	6× Platinum	420,000^{‡}
Austria (IFPI Austria)	7× Platinum	140,000^{*}
Belgium (BRMA)	2× Platinum	60,000^{*}
Brazil (Pro-Música Brasil)	2× Platinum	120,000^{*}
Canada (Music Canada)	7× Platinum	560,000^{^}
Central America	Gold	5,000
Chile	2× Platinum	
Denmark (IFPI Danmark)	2× Platinum	60,000^{^}
Finland (Musiikkituottajat)	Platinum	25,358
France (SNEP)	3× Diamond	1,500,000^{‡}
GCC (IFPI Middle East)	Platinum	6,000^{*}
Germany (BVMI)	13× Gold	1,300,000^{‡}
Greece (IFPI Greece)	Platinum	15,000^{^}
Hungary (MAHASZ)	2× Platinum	12,000^{^}
Ireland (IRMA)	9× Platinum	135,000^{^}
Italy (FIMI)	5× Platinum	250,000^{‡}
Japan (RIAJ)	Million	1,000,000^{^}
Lebanon (IFPI Middle East)	Gold	1,000
Mexico (AMPROFON)	Platinum+Gold	120,000^{^}
Netherlands (NVPI)	Gold	30,000^{^}
New Zealand (RMNZ) Combined with The Fame Monster	11× Platinum	165,000^{‡}
Norway (IFPI Norway)	Platinum	20,000^{‡}
Philippines Combined with The Fame Monster	9× Platinum	
Poland (ZPAV)	3× Platinum	60,000^{*}
Portugal (AFP)	Platinum	20,000^{^}
Russia (NFPF) Combined with The Fame Monster	3× Gold	30,000^{*}
Singapore (RIAS)	2× Platinum	20,000^{*}
Spain (Promusicae)	Platinum	80,000^{^}
Sweden (GLF)	Platinum	40,000^{‡}
Switzerland (IFPI Switzerland)	4× Platinum	120,000^{^}
United Kingdom (BPI)	12× Platinum	3,600,000^{‡}
United States (RIAA)	6× Platinum	6,000,000^{‡}
Summaries
Europe (IFPI)	4× Platinum	4,000,000^{*}
Worldwide	—	15,000,000
^{*} Sales figures based on certification alone.^{^} Shipments figures based on certification alone.^{‡} Sales+streaming figures based on certification alone.

== Release history ==
Release dates and formats
Region	Date	Format(s)	Edition	Label	Ref.
Canada	August 19, 2008	CD; LP; digital download	Canadian	Universal Music	
Australia	September 5, 2008	CD; digital download	standard	Universal Music	
Australia	October 28, 2008	CD; digital download	international	Universal Music	
United States	October 28, 2008	CD; LP; digital download	standard	Streamline; KonLive; Interscope; Cherrytree	
Italy	October 31, 2008	CD; digital download	standard	Universal Music	
Germany	December 2, 2008	CD; digital download	standard	Universal Music	
United Kingdom	January 12, 2009	CD; digital download	standard	Polydor	
Italy	January 30, 2009	CD; digital download	international	Universal Music	
Argentina	February 16, 2009	CD	standard	Universal Music	
Spain	February 24, 2009	CD; digital download	standard	Universal Music	
Brazil	March 31, 2009	CD	standard	Universal Music	
China	May 4, 2009	CD	standard	Universal Music	
Japan	May 20, 2009	CD	Japanese	Universal Music	
Japan	July 22, 2009	CD; DVD	Japanese	Universal Music	
United States	December 14, 2018	USB drive	10th anniversary limited	Streamline; Kon Live; Interscope; Cherrytree	

== See also ==
- List of best-selling albums by women
- List of best-selling albums in Austria
- List of best-selling albums in Germany
- List of best-selling albums in the United Kingdom
- List of UK Albums Chart number ones of the 2000s
- List of UK Albums Chart number ones of the 2010s
- List of European number-one hits of 2009
- List of European number-one hits of 2010
- List of number-one albums of 2009 (Canada)
- List of number-one albums of 2009 (Ireland)
- List of number-one albums of 2010 (Ireland)
- List of number-one albums of 2011 (Poland)
- List of Billboard number-one electronic albums of 2008
- List of Billboard number-one electronic albums of 2009
- List of Billboard number-one electronic albums of 2010
- List of Billboard number-one electronic albums of 2011
- List of Billboard number-one electronic albums of 2017
- List of Billboard number-one electronic albums of 2018
- List of Billboard number-one electronic albums of 2020
- List of Billboard number-one electronic albums of 2021
- List of Billboard number-one electronic albums of 2022
- List of number-one hits of 2009 (Austria)
- List of number-one hits of 2010 (Germany)
- List of number-one hits of 2010 (Switzerland)
