= List of songs recorded by Lady Gaga =

Songs by the American singer Lady Gaga

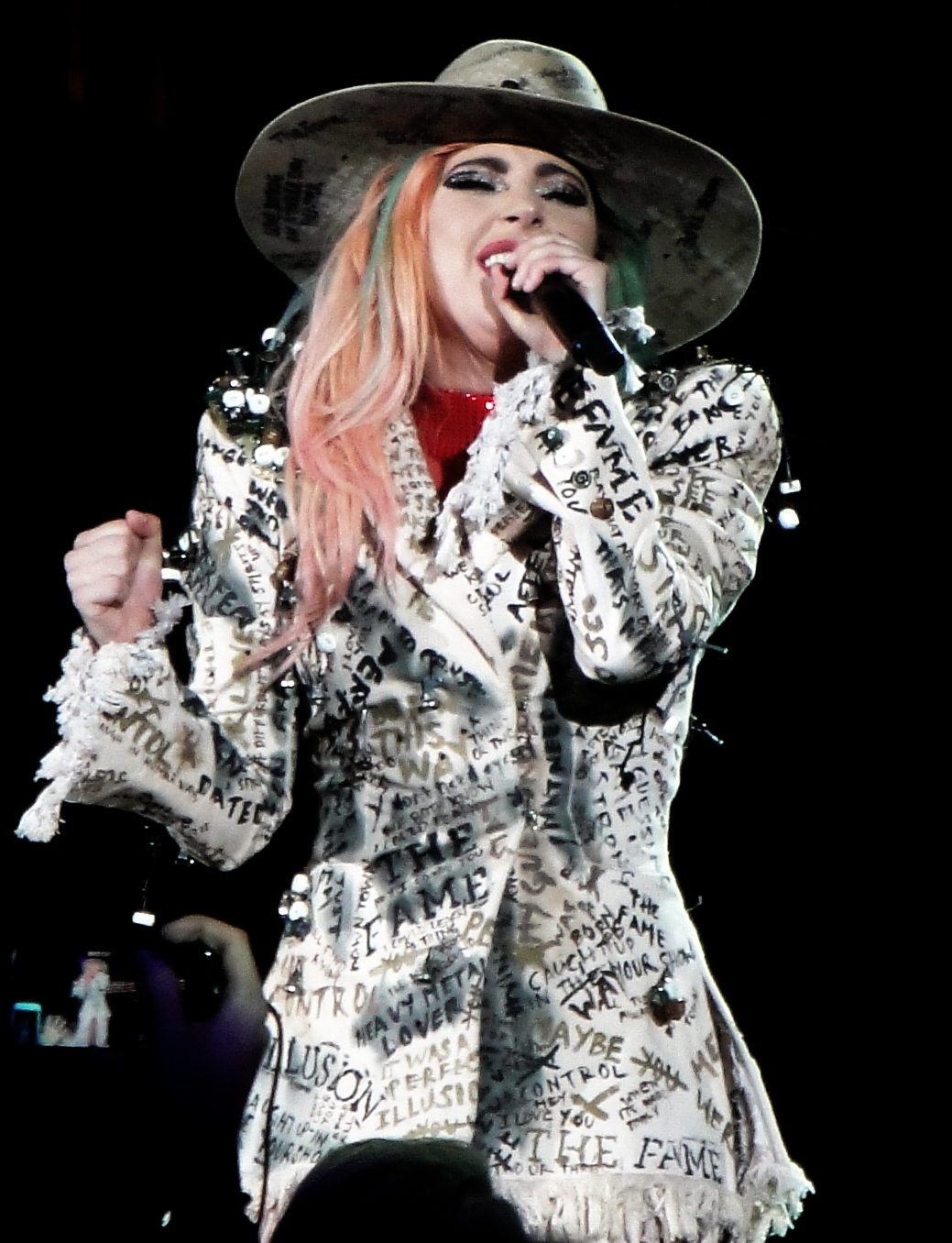
Lady Gaga performing at the Joanne World Tour (2017–2018) in a white outfit covered in song and album titles and lyrics excerpts

The American singer Lady Gaga has recorded material for eight studio albums and three extended plays (EP), and has been featured on songs on other artists' respective albums. After being dropped from a solo contract with Def Jam Recordings, Gaga worked as a songwriter for Sony/ATV Music Publishing, where Akon helped her sign a joint deal with Interscope Records and his own label KonLive Distribution. She released her debut album The Fame (2008), which produced the global chart-topping singles "Just Dance" and "Poker Face". She collaborated with different producers, primarily RedOne, Fernando Garibay, Martin Kierszenbaum, and Rob Fusari. With influences of the 1980s pop music, the album discusses Gaga's desire for fame, love, sexuality, money and drugs. A reissue of her first album, titled The Fame Monster (2009), explores the darker side of fame and contained eight newly recorded songs, including "Speechless" – written solely by Gaga – "Alejandro", "Telephone" and "Bad Romance".

On her second full-length album, Born This Way (2011), Gaga reunited with RedOne and Garibay, and sought new collaborators, including DJ Snake, DJ White Shadow, Jeppe Laursen, and Robert John "Mutt" Lange; the lattermost produced the country rock song "You and I", written solely by Gaga. The album's themes include sexuality, religion, freedom, feminism and individualism. Primarily influenced by synthpop and dance-pop, it incorporated musical genres which had not been previously explored by Gaga, such as electronic rock and techno. "Americano" and "Scheiße" included Spanish and faux-German lyrics, respectively. Gaga's third album Artpop (2013) included the singles "Applause" and "Do What U Want". As executive producer, she enlisted longtime collaborators DJ White Shadow and RedOne, and for the first time Zedd and Madeon. Described as "a celebration and a poetic musical journey", the album revolves around her personal views of fame, love, sex, feminism, self-empowerment, overcoming addiction and reactions to media scrutiny.

In 2014, Gaga and Tony Bennett released a collaborative album titled Cheek to Cheek, which consists of jazz standards and swing classics from composers such as George Gershwin, Cole Porter, Jerome Kern, Duke Ellington and Irving Berlin. Her fifth studio album, Joanne (2016), which had Mark Ronson as the executive producer, is a more personal album, with family influences. In 2020, she released Chromatica, a house-influenced album with lyrics that thematize mental health, depression and finding love through hardship. It features guest vocals from Ariana Grande on "Rain on Me", Blackpink on "Sour Candy" and Elton John on "Sine from Above". Her second album with Bennett, titled Love for Sale, followed in 2021, where the duo covered Cole Porter songs.

In addition to her studio work, Gaga has recorded songs for film soundtracks, including "Fashion" from Confessions of a Shopaholic (2009), and "Til It Happens to You" from The Hunting Ground (2015). She and Bradley Cooper recorded the soundtrack for the movie A Star Is Born, released in 2018, which they composed with other collaborators. It contains elements of blues rock, country and pop. For the 2022 film Top Gun: Maverick, Gaga wrote the song "Hold My Hand", and also composed its score alongside Hans Zimmer and Harold Faltermeyer. During 2025, she released the album Mayhem and a new single from September of the same year titled "The Dead Dance".

== Songs ==
Key
•	Indicates songs containing non-English lyrics
#	Indicates songs with background vocals by Lady Gaga
†	Indicates songs covered by Lady Gaga
‡	Indicates songs written solely by Lady Gaga

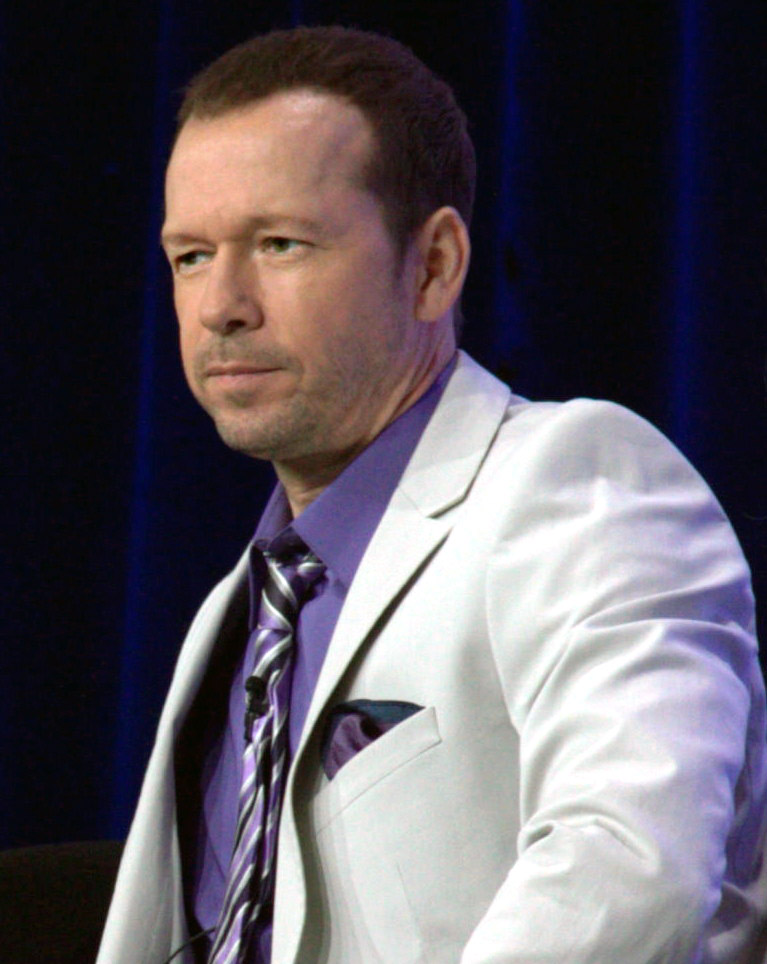
Donnie Wahlberg was one of the co-writers of "Big Girl Now", a song by New Kids on the Block, featuring Gaga.

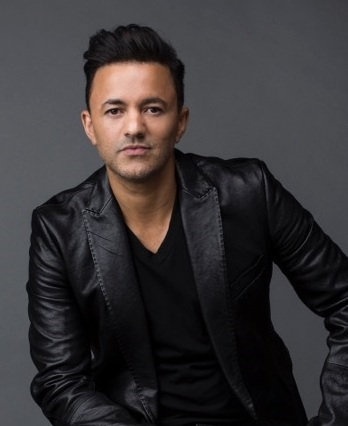
RedOne has co-written several songs with Gaga, including her debut single "Just Dance", which reached the peak position on the Billboard Hot 100.

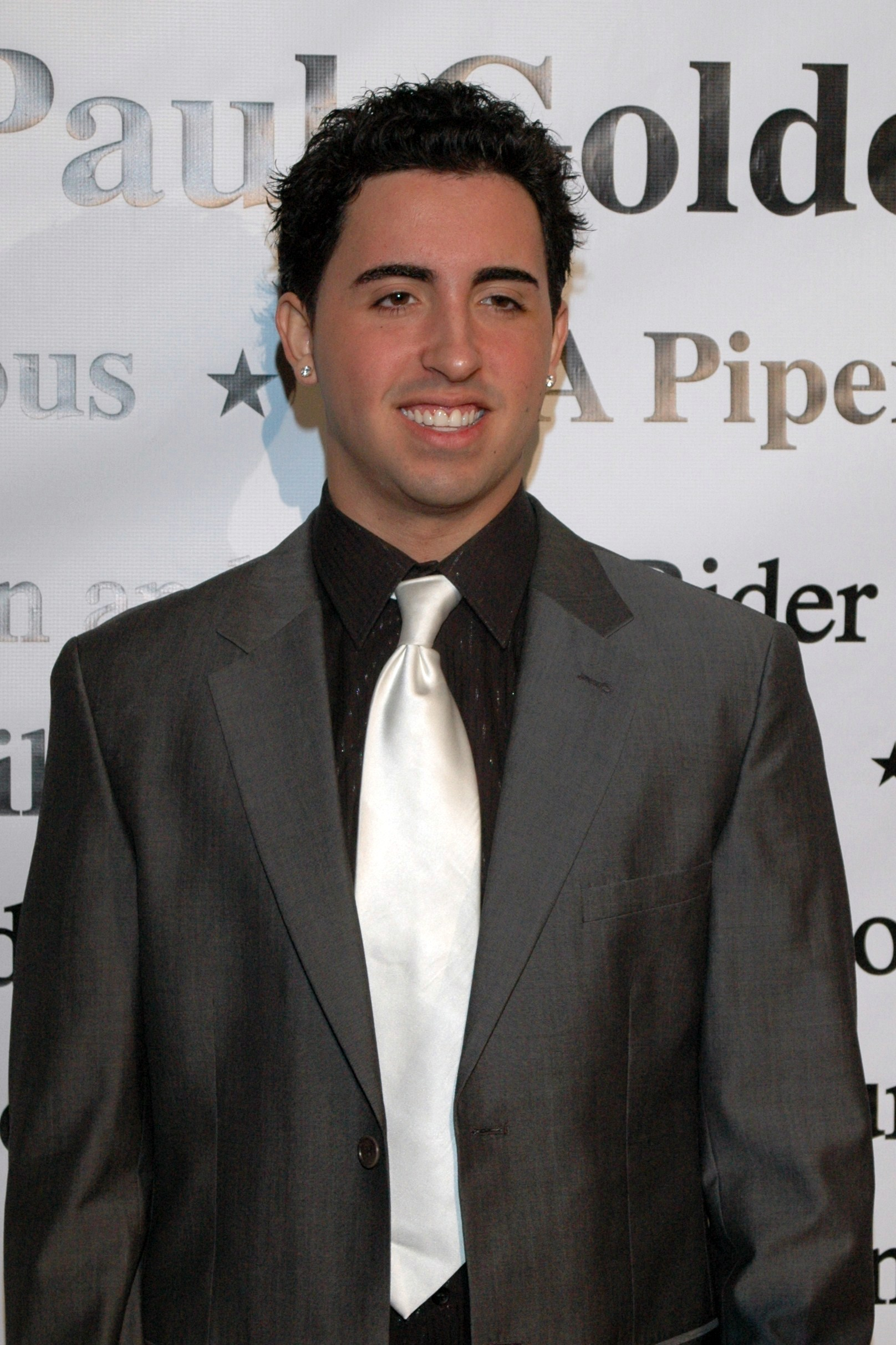
Colby O'Donis appears as a featured artist in the song "Just Dance".

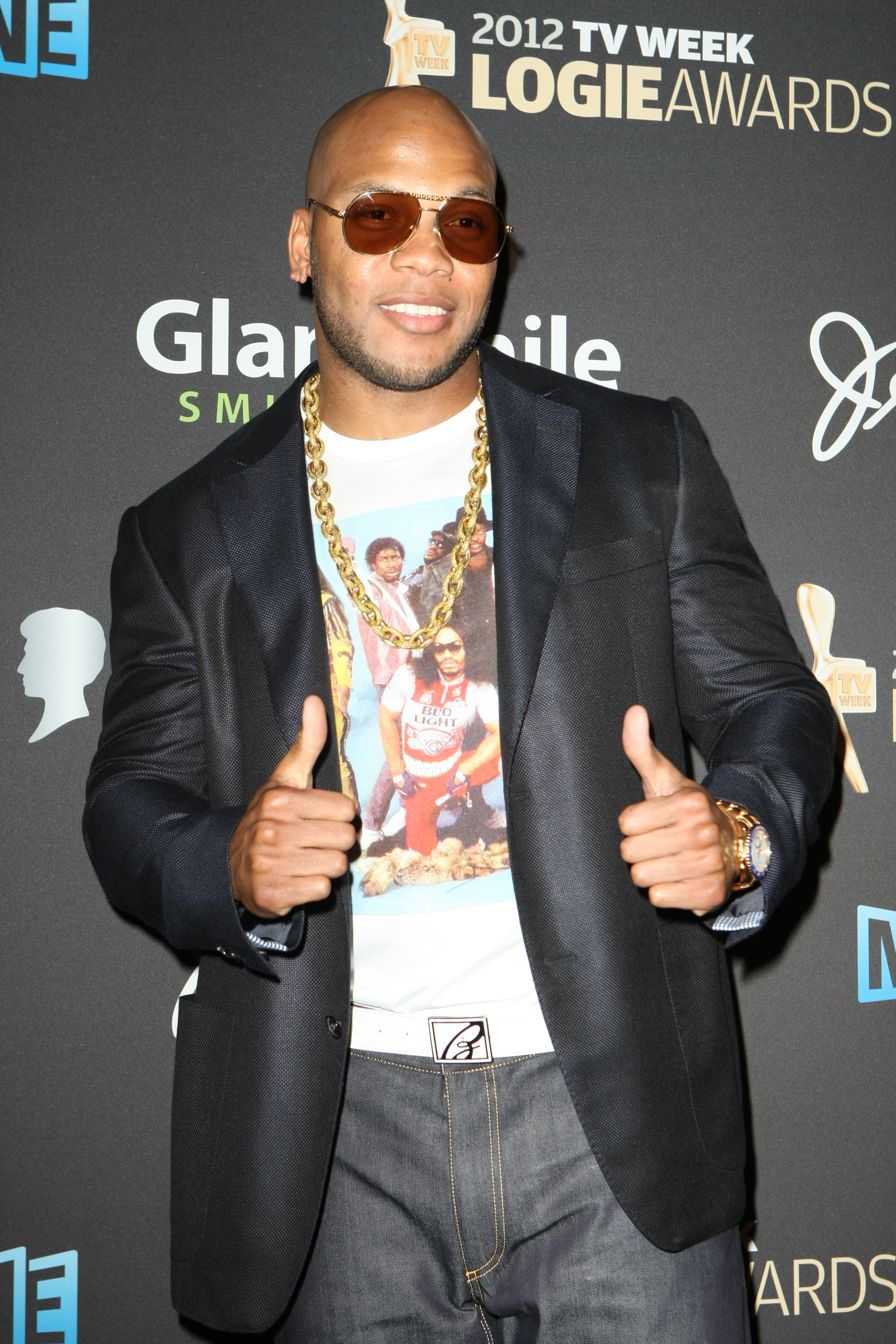
Flo Rida co-wrote and features in the song "Starstruck".

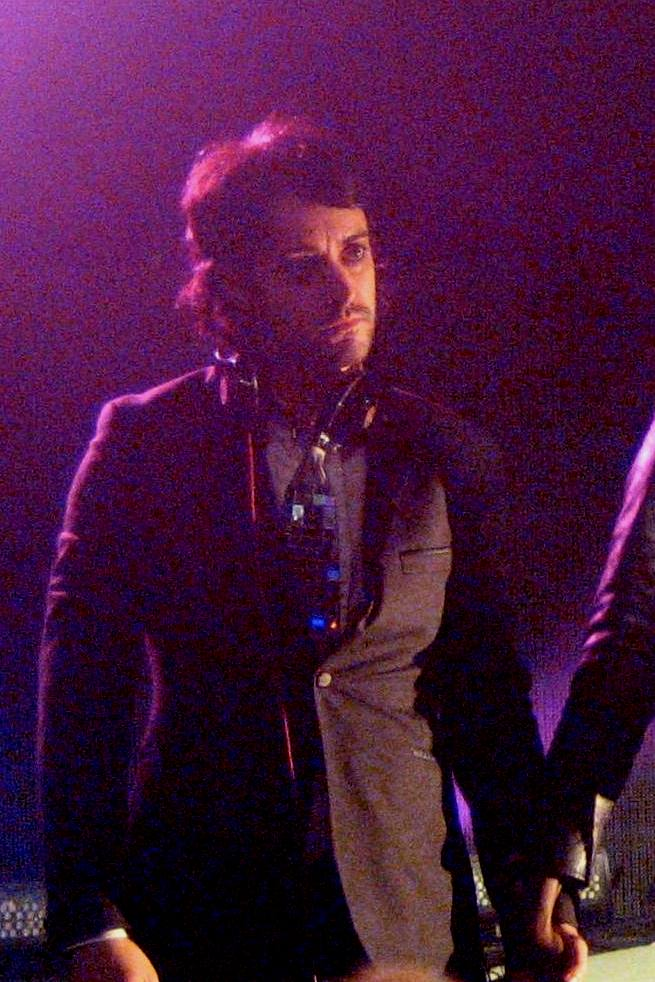
Nick Dresti wrote the songs "Monster", "So Happy I Could Die", and "Starstruck" with Gaga.

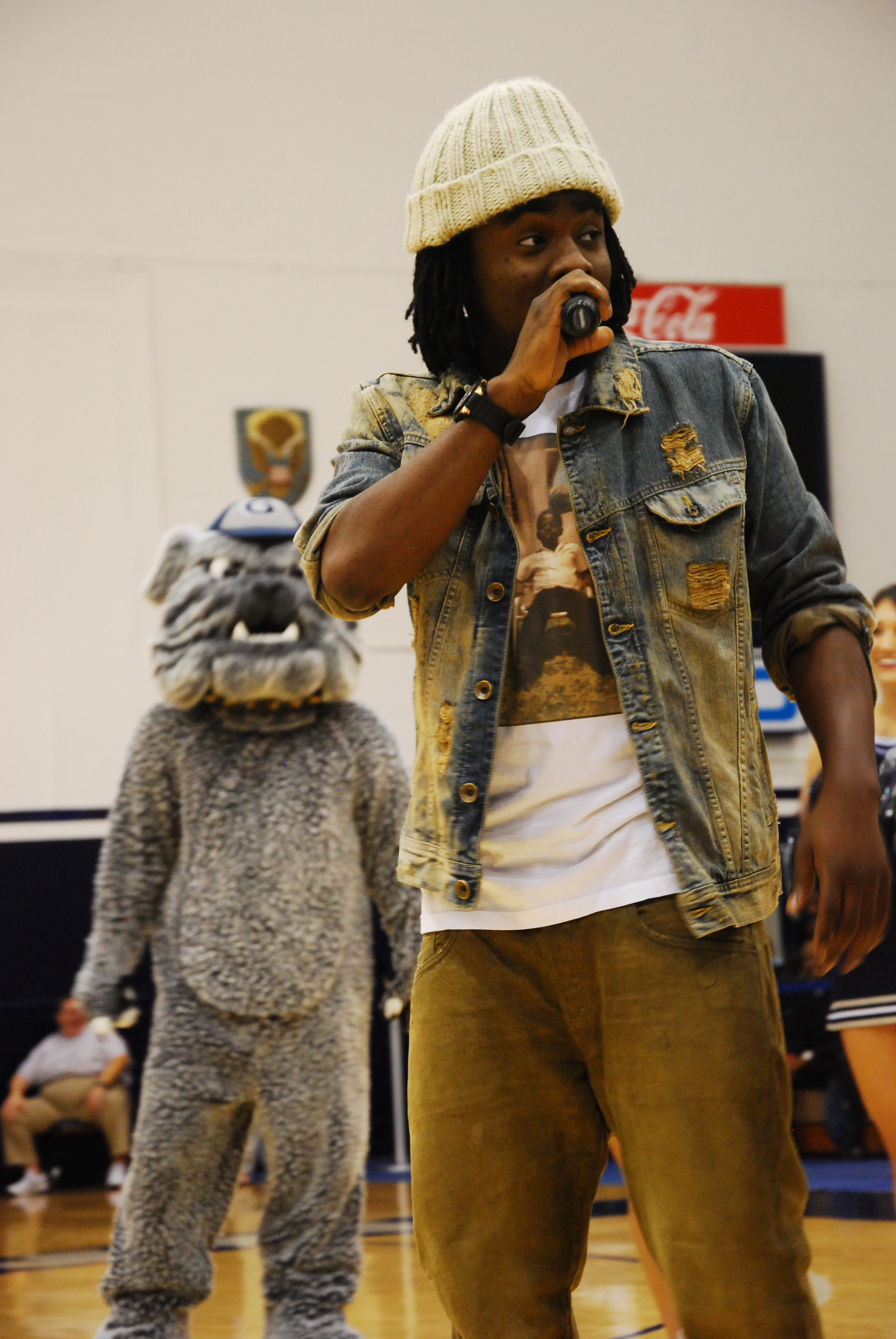
Gaga was the featured artist in rapper Wale's song, "Chillin".

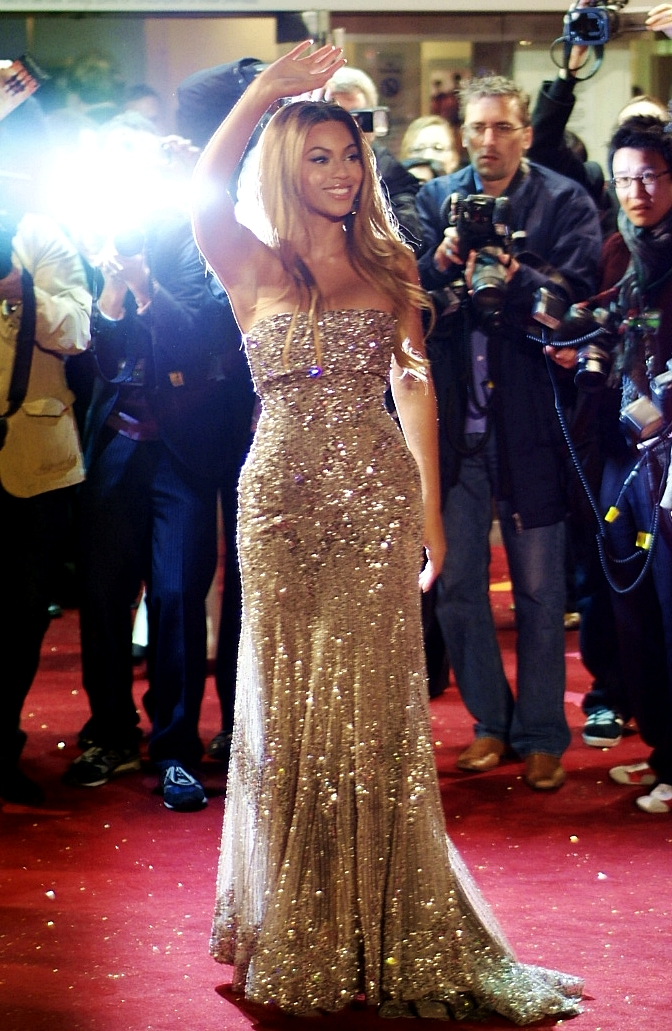
Beyoncé co-wrote and features in the song "Telephone". She also worked with Gaga on the remix of "Video Phone".

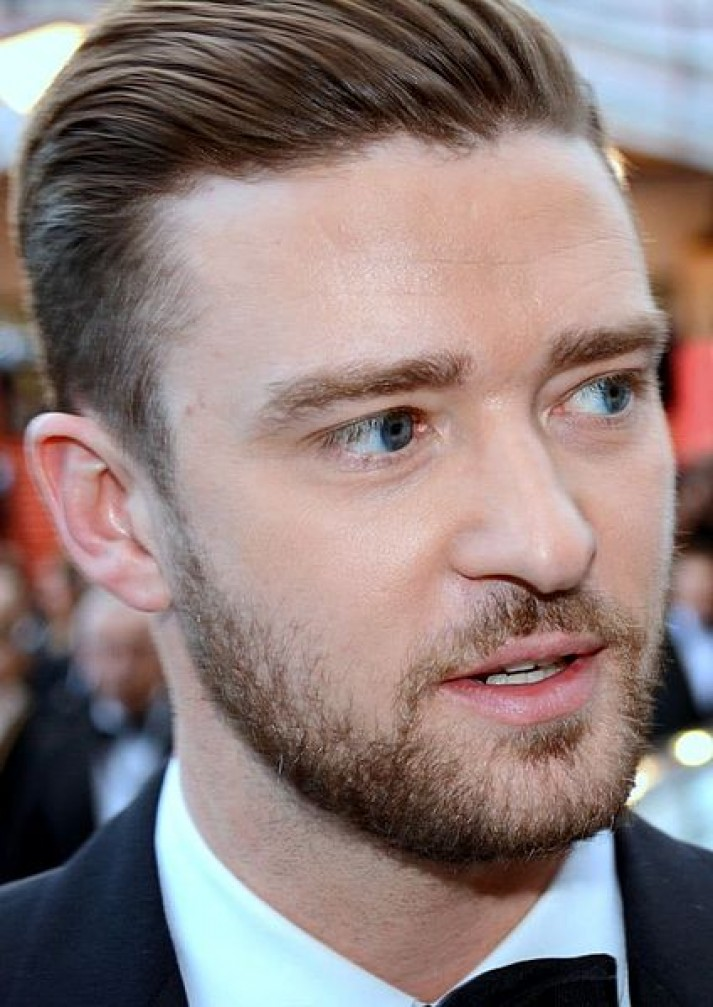
Justin Timberlake and Gaga feature in The Lonely Island's "3-Way (The Golden Rule)".

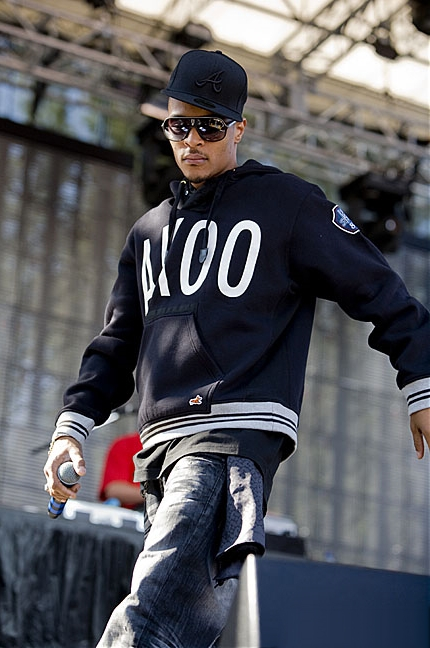
T.I. co-wrote "Jewels N' Drugs" and appears as a featured artist.

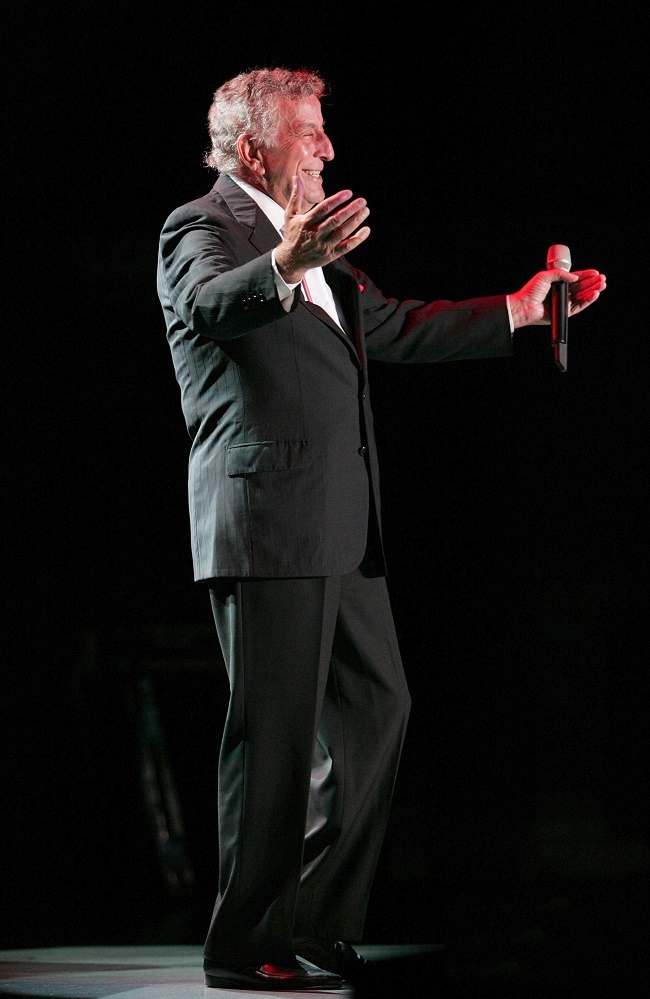
Tony Bennett collaborated with Gaga on the song "The Lady Is a Tramp" as well as the albums Cheek to Cheek (2014) and Love for Sale (2021).

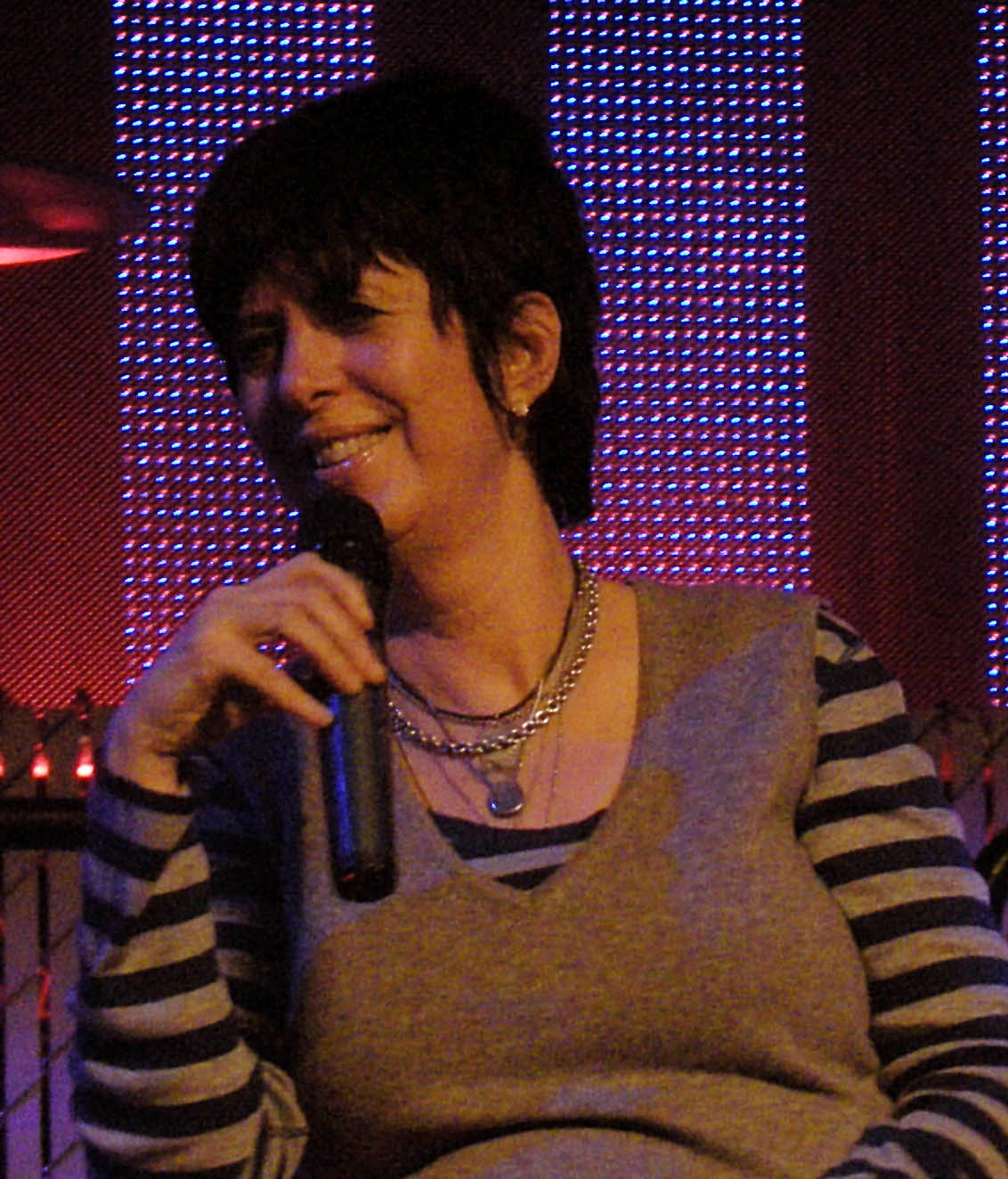
Diane Warren co-wrote "Til It Happens to You" for the 2015 documentary film The Hunting Ground.

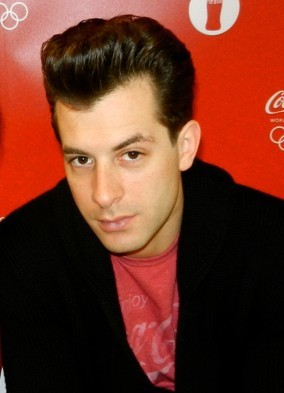
Mark Ronson co-wrote and served as Joanne's (2016) executive producer.

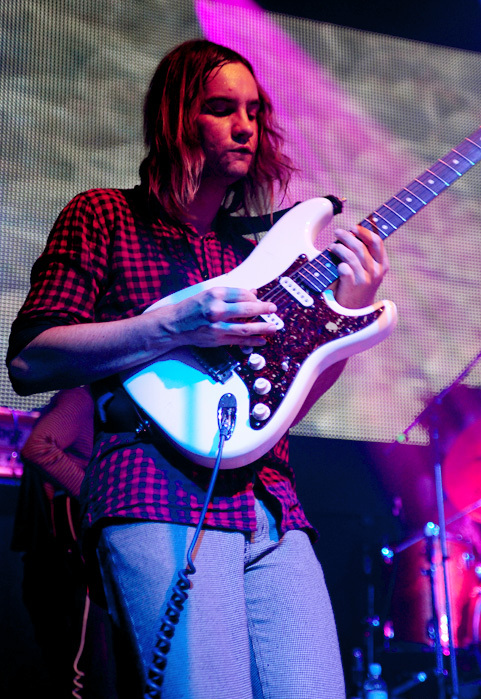
Kevin Parker co-wrote and co-produced "Perfect Illusion".

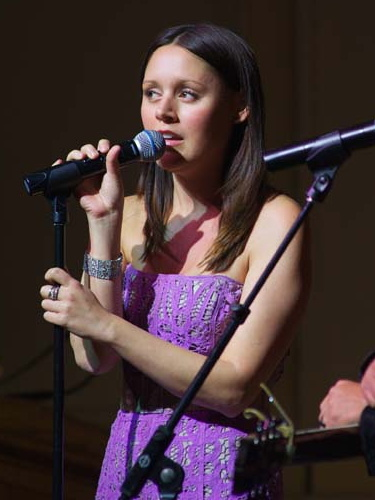
Hillary Lindsey co-wrote "A-Yo", "Million Reasons" and "Grigio Girls".

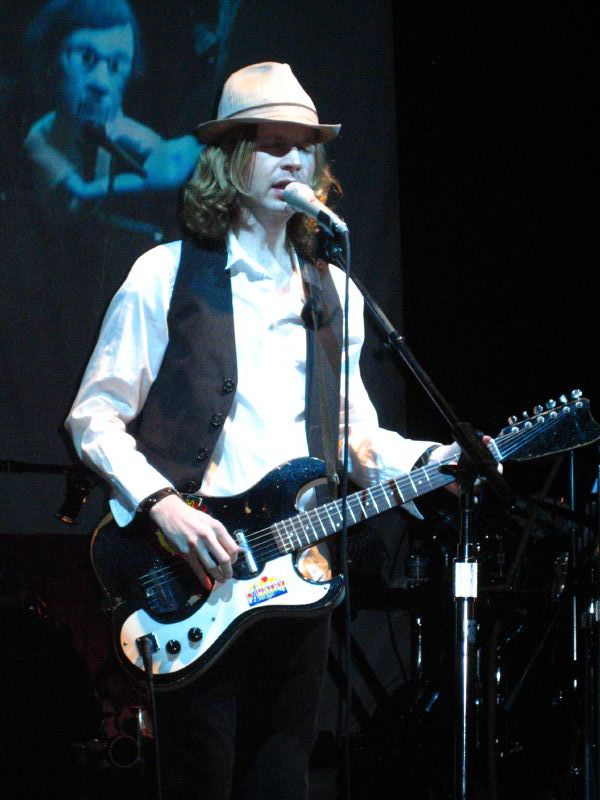
Beck co-wrote "Dancin' in Circles".

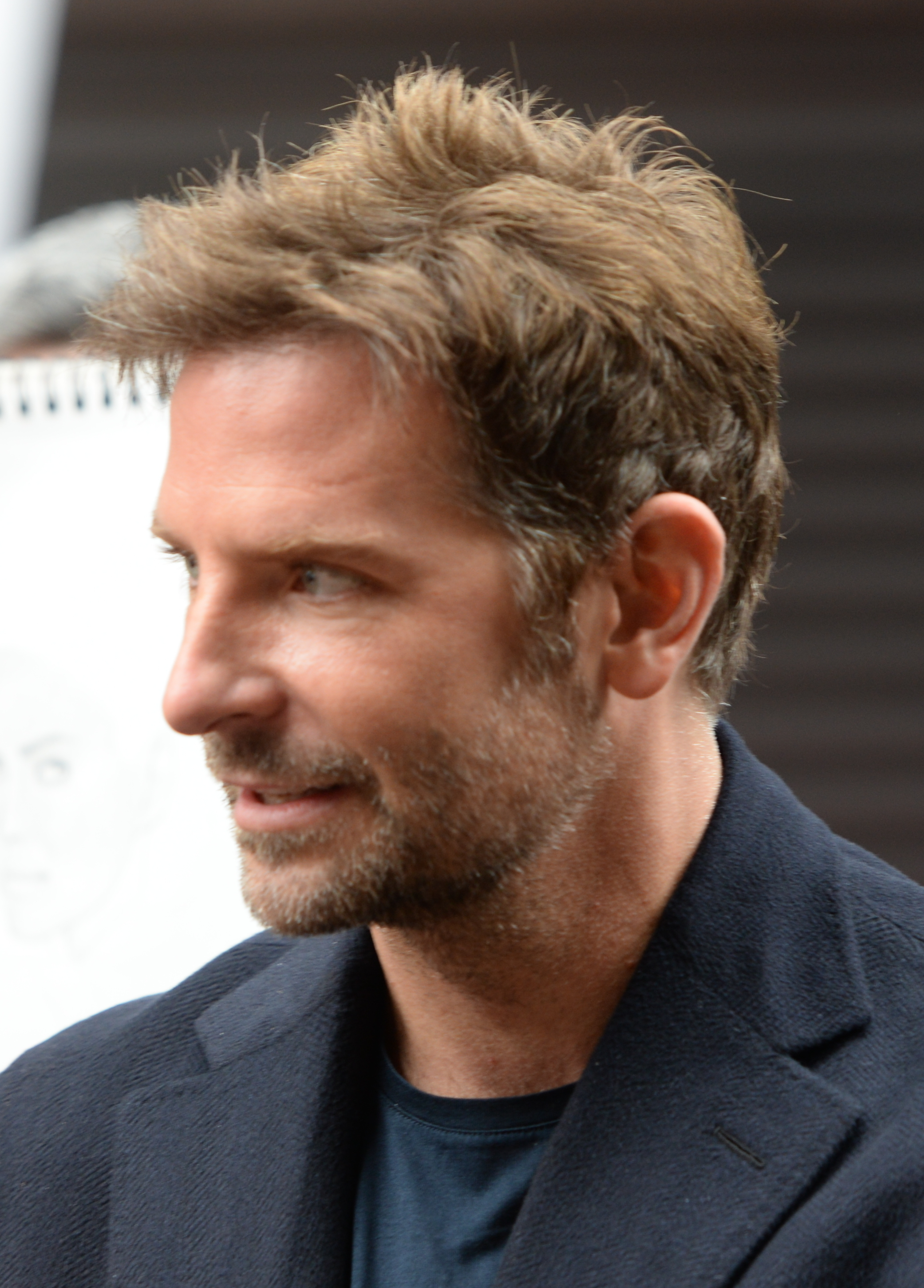
Bradley Cooper collaborated with Gaga on the soundtrack to A Star Is Born (2018).

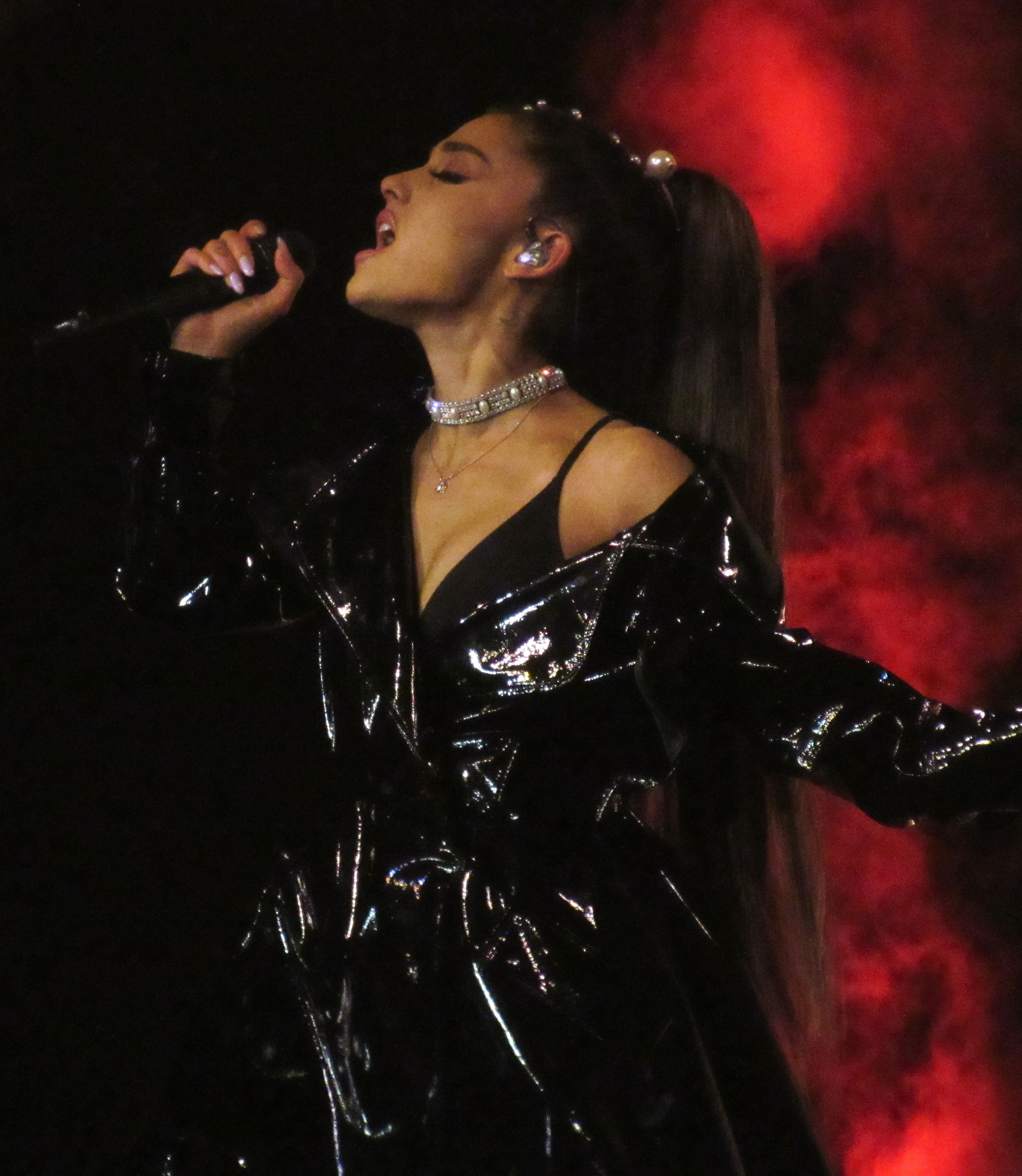
Ariana Grande co-wrote "Rain on Me" and appears as a featured artist.

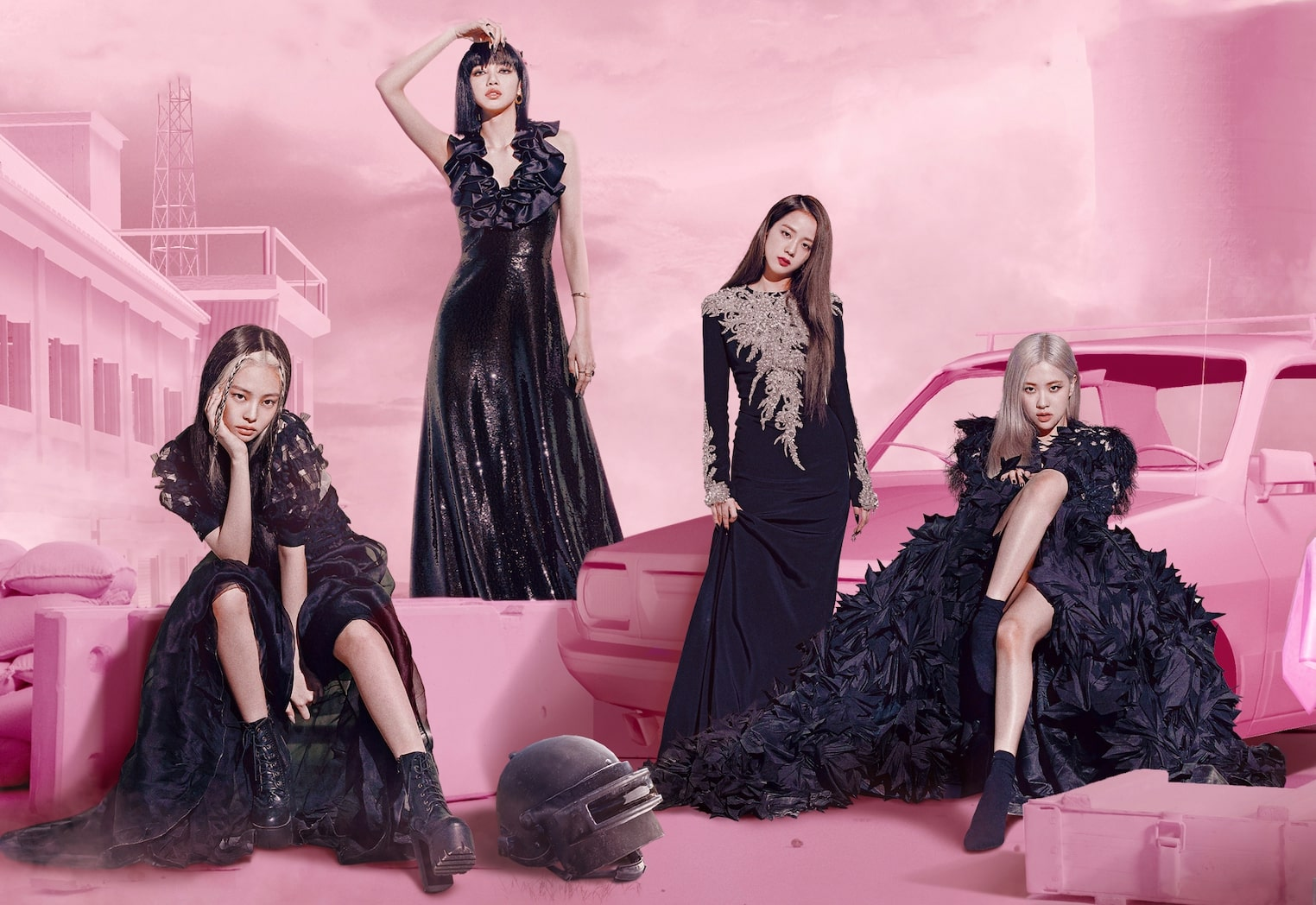
South Korean girl group Blackpink collaborated with Gaga on the song "Sour Candy".

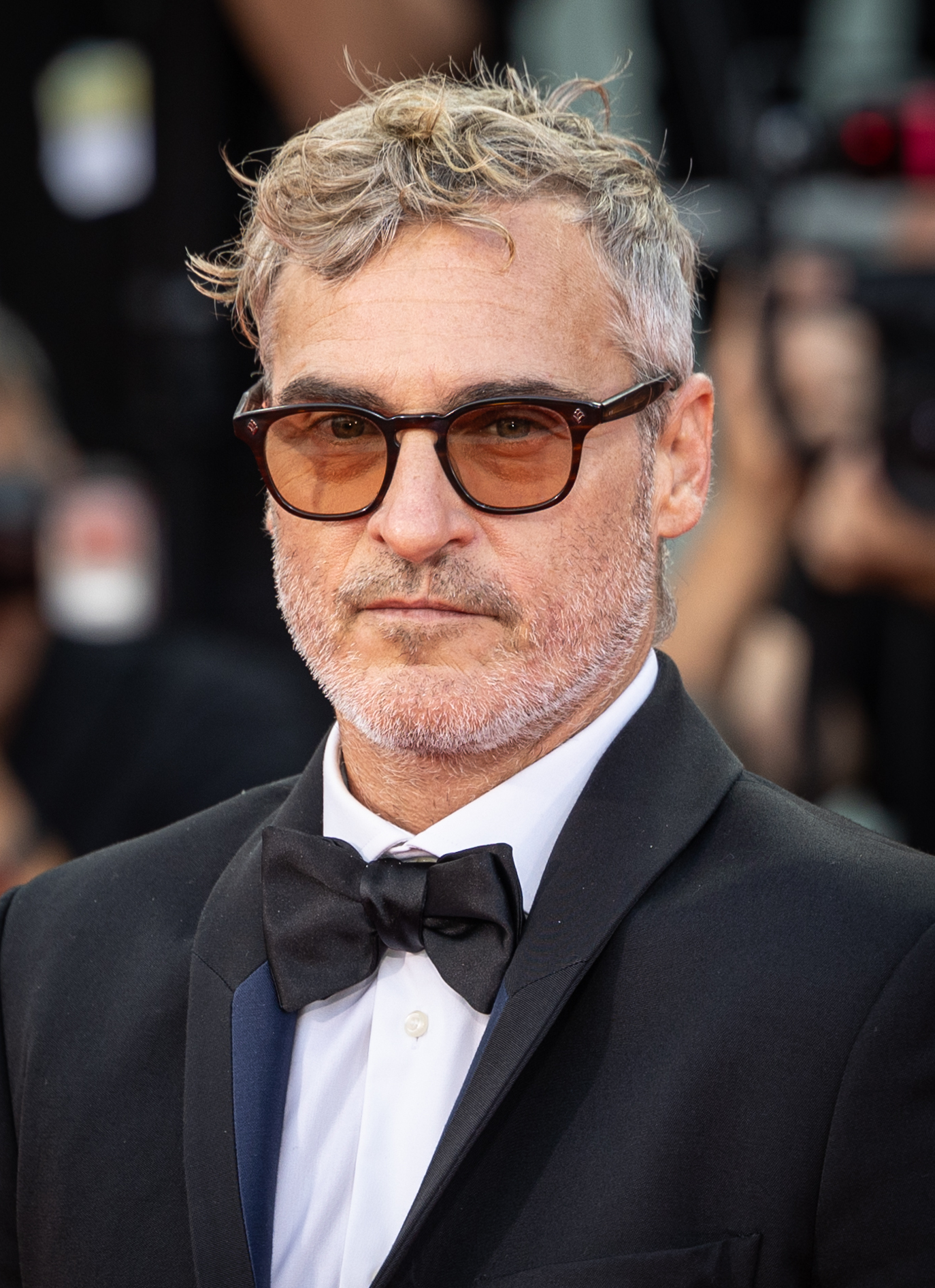
Joaquin Phoenix collaborated with Gaga on the soundtrack to Joker: Folie à Deux (2024).

Name of song, featured performers, writers, originating album, and year released
Song	Other performer(s)	Writer(s)	Album	Year	Ref(s).
"1000 Doves"	None	Lady Gaga; BloodPop; Martin Joseph Léonard Bresso	Chromatica	2020	
"1000 Doves" (Piano Demo)	None	Unknown (Note: There are no published credits for "1000 Doves" (Piano Demo) according to the album booklet.)	Chromatica	2020	
"3-Way (The Golden Rule)"	The Lonely Island; Justin Timberlake	Andy Samberg; Akiva Schaffer; Jorma Taccone; Justin Timberlake; Alex Schwartz; Joe Khajadourian	The Wack Album	2011	
"911"	None	Lady Gaga; BloodPop; Madeon; Justin Tranter	Chromatica	2020	
"A-Yo"	None	Lady Gaga; Hillary Lindsey; Mark Ronson; BloodPop	Joanne	2016	
"Abracadabra"	None	Lady Gaga; Andrew Watt; Henry Walter; Susan Ballion; Peter Edward Clarke; John McGeoch; Steven Severin	Mayhem	2025	
"Again Again"	None	Lady Gaga; Rob Fusari	The Fame	2008	
"Alejandro" • (Note: Gaga performs one line in Spanish on "Alejandro".)	None	Lady Gaga; RedOne	The Fame Monster	2009	
"Alice"	None	Lady Gaga; BloodPop; Axel Hedfors; Justin Tranter; Johannes Klahr	Chromatica	2020	
"Always Remember Us This Way"	None	Lady Gaga; Natalie Hemby; Hillary Lindsey; Lori McKenna	A Star Is Born	2018	
"Americano" • (Note: Gaga performs "Americano" in both English and Spanish.)	None	Lady Gaga; Fernando Garibay; Paul "DJ White Shadow" Blair; Cheche Alara	Born This Way	2011	
"Angel Down"	None	Lady Gaga; RedOne	Joanne	2016	
"Angel Down" (Work Tape)	None	Lady Gaga; RedOne	Joanne	2016	
"Anything Goes" †	Tony Bennett	Cole Porter	Cheek to Cheek	2014	
"Applause"	None	Lady Gaga; Paul "DJ White Shadow" Blair; Dino Zisis; Nick Monson; Martin Bresso; Nicholas Mercier; Julien Arias; William Grigahcine	Artpop	2013	
"Artpop"	None	Lady Gaga; Paul "DJ White Shadow" Blair; Dino Zisis; Nick Monson	Artpop	2013	
"Aura"	None	Lady Gaga; Anton Zaslavski; Amit Duvdevani; Erez Eisen	Artpop	2013	
"Baby, It's Cold Outside" † (Note: Gaga and Bennett recorded "Baby, It's Cold Outside" for Barnes & Noble's 2015 holiday campaign.)	Tony Bennett	Frank Loesser	None	2015	
"Babylon"	None	Lady Gaga; BloodPop; Matthew Burns	Chromatica	2020	
"Bad Kids"	None	Lady Gaga; Jeppe Laursen; Fernando Garibay; Paul "DJ White Shadow" Blair	Born This Way	2011	
"Bad Romance" • (Note: Gaga performs a few lines in French on "Bad Romance".)	None	Lady Gaga; RedOne	The Fame Monster	2009	
"Bang Bang (My Baby Shot Me Down)" (Live from Jazz at Lincoln Center) †	None	Sonny Bono	Cheek to Cheek	2014	
"The Beast"	None	Lady Gaga; Andrew Watt; Henry Walter; Michael Polansky	Mayhem	2025	
"Beautiful, Dirty, Rich"	None	Lady Gaga; Rob Fusari	The Fame	2008	
"Before I Cry"	None	Lady Gaga; Mark Nilan Jr. Nick Monson; Paul "DJWS" Blair	A Star Is Born	2018	
"Bewitched" (Note: "Bewitched" and "Bewitched, Bothered and Bewildered" are the same song under different titles.) †	Joaquin Phoenix	Richard Rodgers; Lorenz Hart	Joker: Folie à Deux	2024	
"Bewitched, Bothered and Bewildered" (Live from Jazz at Lincoln Center) †	None	Richard Rodgers; Lorenz Hart	Cheek to Cheek	2014	
"Big Girl Now"	New Kids on the Block	RedOne; Donnie Wahlberg; Jordan Knight	The Block	2008	
"Bitch, Don't Kill My Vibe" (The LG Mix)	Kendrick Lamar	Lady Gaga; Kendrick Duckworth; Mark Spears; Robin Braun; Vindahl Friis; Lykke Schmidt	None	2012	
"Black Jesus + Amen Fashion"	None	Lady Gaga; Paul "DJ White Shadow" Blair	Born This Way	2011	
"Blade of Grass"	None	Lady Gaga; Andrew Watt; Gesaffelstein; Michael Polansky	Mayhem	2025	
"Bloody Mary" • (Note: Gaga performs a few lines in French and Spanish on "Bloody Mary".)	None	Lady Gaga; Fernando Garibay; Paul "DJ White Shadow" Blair	Born This Way	2011	
"Born This Way" • (Note: Gaga performs a few words in Italian on "Born This Way".)	None	Lady Gaga; Jeppe Laursen	Born This Way	2011	
"Born This Way" (The Country Road Version) • (Note: Gaga recorded alternate vocals and lyrics for "Born This Way" (The Country Road Version).)	None	Lady Gaga; Jeppe Laursen	Born This Way	2011	
"Born This Way" (Live from the Apollo) • (Note: The live EP contains "Poker Face", "Born This Way" and "You and I" from her special performance of Enigma at the Apollo Theater in collaboration with SiriusXM and Pandora.)	None	Lady Gaga; Jeppe Laursen	Lady Gaga Live from the Apollo (as Broadcast on SiriusXM)	2019	
"Boys Boys Boys"	None	Lady Gaga; RedOne	The Fame	2008	
"Brown Eyes"	None	Lady Gaga; Rob Fusari	The Fame	2008	
"But Beautiful" †	Tony Bennett	Jimmy Van Heusen; Johnny Burke	Cheek to Cheek	2014	
"Can't Stop the High"	None	Lady Gaga; Andrew Watt; Henry Walter	Mayhem	2025	
"Carolina" #	Lukas Nelson & Promise of the Real; Lucius	Lukas Nelson & Promise of the Real	Lukas Nelson & Promise of the Real	2017	
"Cheek to Cheek" †	Tony Bennett	Irving Berlin	Cheek to Cheek	2014	
"Chillin'"	Wale	Lady Gaga; Olubowale Akintimehin; Gary De Carlo; Dale Frashuer; Roy C Hammond; Paul Leka; Andre Christopher Lyon; Makeba Riddick; Kirk Robinson; Marcello Valenzano	Attention Deficit	2009	
"Christmas Tree"	Space Cowboy	Lady Gaga; Nicolas Dresti	None	2008	
"Chromatica I"	None	Lady Gaga; Morgan Kibby	Chromatica	2020	
"Chromatica II"	None	Lady Gaga; Morgan Kibby	Chromatica	2020	
"Chromatica III"	None	Lady Gaga; Morgan Kibby	Chromatica	2020	
"Close to You" (Note: "Close to You" and "(They Long to Be) Close to You" are the same songs under different titles.) †	None	Burt Bacharach; Hal David	Harlequin	2024	
"Come to Mama"	None	Lady Gaga; Josh Tillman; Mark Ronson; Emile Haynie	Joanne	2016	
"The Cure"	None	Lady Gaga; Paul "DJ White Shadow" Blair; Lukas Nelson; Mark Nilan; Nick Monson	None	2017	
"Dance in the Dark"	None	Lady Gaga; Fernando Garibay	The Fame Monster	2009	
"Dancin' in Circles"	None	Lady Gaga; Beck; BloodPop; Mark Ronson	Joanne	2016	
"Diamond Heart"	None	Lady Gaga; Mark Ronson; Josh Homme	Joanne	2016	
"Die with a Smile"	Bruno Mars	Lady Gaga; Bruno Mars; Dernst Emile II; Andrew Watt; James Fauntleroy	Mayhem	2024	
"Diggin' My Grave"	Bradley Cooper	Paul Kennerley	A Star Is Born	2018	
"Disco Heaven"	None	Lady Gaga; Rob Fusari; Tom Kafafian	The Fame	2008	
"Disease"	None	Lady Gaga; Andrew Watt; Henry Walter; Michael Polansky	Mayhem	2024	
"Do I Love You" †	None	Cole Porter	Love for Sale	2021	
"Do What U Want"	R. Kelly	Lady Gaga; Paul "DJ White Shadow" Blair; Martin Bresso; R. Kelly; William Grigahcine	Artpop	2013	
"Do What U Want" (Remix)	Christina Aguilera	Lady Gaga; Paul "DJ White Shadow" Blair; Martin Bresso; R. Kelly; William Grigahcine	None	2014	
"Donatella"	None	Lady Gaga; Anton Zaslavski	Artpop	2013	
"Don't Call Tonight"	None	Lady Gaga; Andrew Watt; Henry Walter; Michael Polansky	Mayhem	2025	
"Don't Let Me Be Misunderstood" †	Brian Newman	Bennie Benjamin; Gloria Caldwell; Sol Marcus	Showboat	2018	
"Dope"	None	Lady Gaga; Paul "DJ White Shadow" Blair; Nick Monson; Dino Zisis	Artpop	2013	
"Dream Dancing" †	Tony Bennett	Cole Porter	Love for Sale	2021	
"The Dead Dance"	None	Lady Gaga; Andrew Watt; Henry Walter	Mayhem	2025	
"The Edge of Glory"	None	Lady Gaga; Fernando Garibay; Paul "DJ White Shadow" Blair	Born This Way	2011	
"The Edge of Glory" (Live Version) (Note: Gaga re-recorded "The Edge of Glory" and "You and I" with new vocals for her extended play, A Very Gaga Holiday (2011).)	None	Lady Gaga; Fernando Garibay; Paul "DJ White Shadow" Blair	A Very Gaga Holiday	2011	
"Eh, Eh (Nothing Else I Can Say)" • (Note: Gaga performs one word in French.)	None	Lady Gaga; Martin Kierszenbaum	The Fame	2008	
"Eh, Eh (Nothing Else I Can Say)" (Electric Piano & Human Beat Box Version) • (Note: Gaga re-recorded "Eh, Eh (Nothing Else I Can Say)", "Just Dance", and "Poker Face" with new vocals for her extended play, The Cherrytree Sessions (2009).)	None	Lady Gaga; Martin Kierszenbaum	The Cherrytree Sessions	2009	
"Electric Chapel"	None	Lady Gaga; Paul "DJ White Shadow" Blair	Born This Way	2011	
"Enigma"	None	Lady Gaga; Morgan Kibby; Matthew Burns; Jacob "Jkash" Hindlin	Chromatica	2020	
"Ev'ry Time We Say Goodbye" †	None	Cole Porter	Cheek to Cheek	2014	
"The Fame"	None	Lady Gaga; Martin Kierszenbaum	The Fame	2008	
"Fashion"	None	Lady Gaga; RedOne	Confessions of a Shopaholic	2009	
"Fashion!"	None	Lady Gaga; Paul "DJ White Shadow" Blair	Artpop	2013	
"Fashion of His Love"	None	Lady Gaga; Fernando Garibay	Born This Way	2011	
"Find Yourself" #	Lukas Nelson & Promise of the Real	Lukas Nelson & Promise of the Real	Lukas Nelson & Promise of the Real	2017	
"Firefly" †	Tony Bennett	Cy Coleman; Carolyn Leigh	Cheek to Cheek	2014	
"Folie à Deux"	None	Lady Gaga ‡	Harlequin	2024	
"Folie à Deux" (Film Version)	None	Lady Gaga ‡	Joker: Folie à Deux	2024	
"Fountain of Truth"	Melle Mel	Lady Gaga; Melle Mel; Cricket Casey	The Portal in the Park (bonus CD audio book)	2006	
"Free Woman"	None	Lady Gaga; BloodPop; Axel Hedfors; Johannes Klahr	Chromatica	2020	
"Fun Tonight"	None	Lady Gaga; BloodPop; Matthew Burns; Rami Yacoub	Chromatica	2020	
"G.U.Y."	None	Lady Gaga; Anton Zaslavski	Artpop	2013	
"Garden of Eden"	None	Lady Gaga; Andrew Watt; Mike Lévy; Henry Walter	Mayhem	2025	
"Get Happy (2024)" †	None	Harold Arlen; Ted Koehler; Lady Gaga; Michael Polansky	Harlequin	2024	
"Gimme Shelter" (Live) †	The Rolling Stones	Jagger–Richards	Grrr Live!	2023	
"Glamorous Life"	None	Lady Gaga; Andrew Watt; Henry Walter; Michael Polansky	The Devil Wears Prada 2	2026	
"Gonna Build a Mountain" †	None	Leslie Bricusse; Anthony Newley	Harlequin	2024	
"Gonna Build a Mountain" (Film Version) †	Joaquin Phoenix	Leslie Bricusse; Anthony Newley	Joker: Folie à Deux	2024	
"Good Morning" †	None	Nacio Herb Brown; Arthur Freed; Lady Gaga; Michael Polansky	Harlequin	2024	
"Goody Goody" †	Tony Bennett	Matty Malneck; Johnny Mercer	Cheek to Cheek	2014	
"Government Hooker" • (Note: Gaga performs a few lines in faux-Italian and one line in Spanish on "Government Hooker".)	None	Lady Gaga; Fernando Garibay; Paul "DJ White Shadow" Blair	Born This Way	2011	
"Grigio Girls" • (Note: Gaga performs one word in Italian.)	None	Lady Gaga; Hillary Lindsey; Mark Ronson; BloodPop	Joanne	2016	
"Gypsy"	None	Lady Gaga; Paul "DJ White Shadow" Blair; RedOne	Artpop	2013	
"Hair"	None	Lady Gaga; RedOne	Born This Way	2011	
"Happy Mistake"	None	Lady Gaga; BloodPop	Harlequin	2024	
"Hair Body Face"	None	Lady Gaga; Mark Nilan Jr. Nick Monson; Paul "DJWS" Blair	A Star Is Born	2018	
"Heal Me"	None	Lady Gaga; Mark Nilan Jr. Nick Monson; Paul "DJWS" Blair; Julia Michaels; Justin Tranter	A Star Is Born	2018	
"Heavy Metal Lover"	None	Lady Gaga; Fernando Garibay	Born This Way	2011	
"Hello, Hello" (Note: The duet of Elton John and Gaga for "Hello, Hello" was featured in the film Gnomeo & Juliet, but the soundtrack version only features John.)	Elton John	Lady Gaga; Bernie Taupin; Elton John	None	2011	
"Hey Girl"	Florence Welch	Lady Gaga; Florence Welch; Mark Ronson	Joanne	2016	
"Highway Unicorn (Road to Love)"	None	Lady Gaga; Fernando Garibay; Paul "DJ White Shadow" Blair; RedOne	Born This Way	2011	
"Hold My Hand"	None	Lady Gaga; BloodPop	Top Gun: Maverick (Music from the Motion Picture)	2022	
"How Bad Do U Want Me"	None	Lady Gaga; Andrew Watt; Henry Walter; Michael Polansky	Mayhem	2025	
"I Can't Give You Anything But Love †	Tony Bennett	Jimmy McHugh; Dorothy Fields	Cheek to Cheek	2014	
"I Concentrate on You" †	Tony Bennett	Cole Porter	Love for Sale	2021	
"I Don't Know What Love Is"	Bradley Cooper	Lady Gaga; Lukas Nelson	A Star Is Born	2018	
"I Get a Kick Out of You" †	Tony Bennett	Cole Porter	Love for Sale	2021	
"I Like It Rough"	None	Lady Gaga; Martin Kierszenbaum	The Fame	2008	
"I Wanna Be With You" (Live at iTunes Festival 2013) (Note: Gaga performed few songs from Artpop (2013) at the iTunes Festival 2013, including "I Wanna Be with You", in which was later renamed to "Dope".)	None	Unknown	Artpop	2013	
"I Want Your Love" (Note: Gaga recorded "I Want Your Love" in 2015 for Tom Ford's 2016 spring/summer campaign but it was not released as a single, for individual purchase or streaming, or as part of an album until an updated and extended version was officially released in 2018 on Chic's studio album It's About Time.)	Nile Rodgers; Chic	Nile Rodgers; Bernard Edwards	It's About Time	2018	
"I Won't Dance" †	Tony Bennett	Jerome Kern; Oscar Hammerstein II; Otto Harbach	Cheek to Cheek	2014	
"I'll Never Love Again" (Extended Version)	None	Lady Gaga; Natalie Hemby; Hillary Lindsey; Aaron Raitiere	A Star Is Born	2018	
"I'll Never Love Again" (Film Version)	Bradley Cooper	Lady Gaga; Natalie Hemby; Hillary Lindsey; Aaron Raitiere	A Star Is Born	2018	
"I've Got the World on a String" (Note: "I've Got the World on a String" and "World on a String" are the same song under different titles.) (Film Version) †	None	Harold Arlen; Ted Koehler	Joker: Folie à Deux	2024	
"I've Got You Under My Skin" †	Tony Bennett	Cole Porter	Love for Sale	2021	
"If My Friends Could See Me Now" †	None	Cy Coleman; Dorothy Fields; Lady Gaga; Michael Polansky	Harlequin	2024	
"If My Friends Could See Me Now" (Film Version) †	Joaquin Phoenix	Cy Coleman; Dorothy Fields	Joker: Folie à Deux	2024	
"Is That Alright?"	None	Lady Gaga; Mark Nilan Jr. Nick Monson; Paul "DJWS" Blair; Aaron Raitiere	A Star Is Born	2018	
"It Don't Mean a Thing (If It Ain't Got That Swing)" †	Tony Bennett	Duke Ellington; Irving Mills	Cheek to Cheek	2014	
"It's De-Lovely" †	Tony Bennett	Cole Porter	Love for Sale	2021	
"Jewels N' Drugs"	T.I. Too Short; Twista	Lady Gaga; Paul "DJ White Shadow" Blair; Nick Monson; Dino Zisis; Twista; Too Short; Clifford Harris	Artpop	2013	
"Joanne"	None	Lady Gaga; Mark Ronson	Joanne	2016	
"Joanne (Where Do You Think You're Goin'?)" [Piano Version] (Note: Gaga recorded alternate vocals and lyrics for "Joanne (Where Do You Think You're Goin'?)" [Piano Version], which won the Grammy Award for Best Pop Solo Performance in the 2019 edition.)	None	Lady Gaga; Mark Ronson	None	2018	
"John Wayne"	None	Lady Gaga; Mark Ronson	Joanne	2016	
"The Joker" †	None	Leslie Bricusse; Anthony Newley	Harlequin	2024	
"Judas"	None	Lady Gaga; RedOne	Born This Way	2011	
"Just Another Day"	None	Lady Gaga ‡	Joanne	2016	
"Just Dance"	Colby O'Donis	Lady Gaga; Aliaun Thiam; RedOne	The Fame	2008	
"Just Dance" (Stripped Down Version)	None	Lady Gaga; Aliaun Thiam; RedOne	The Cherrytree Sessions	2009	
"Kill for Love"	None	Lady Gaga; Andrew Watt; Henry Walter	Mayhem	2025	
"Killah"	Gesaffelstein	Lady Gaga; Andrew Watt; Mike Lévy; Henry Walter	Mayhem	2025	
"La Vie en rose" • † (Note: Gaga performs "La Vie en rose" in French.)	None	Édith Piaf; Louiguy; Marguerite Monnot	A Star Is Born	2018	
"La Vie en rose" (Live) • † (Note: Gaga performed "La Vie en rose" and "The Lady Is a Tramp" live at the 2016 television special Tony Bennett Celebrates 90: The Best Is Yet to Come.)	None	Édith Piaf; Louiguy; Marguerite Monnot	Tony Bennett Celebrates 90	2016	
"The Lady Is a Tramp" †	Tony Bennett	Richard Rodgers; Lorenz Hart	Duets II	2011	
"The Lady Is a Tramp" (Live) †	None	Richard Rodgers; Lorenz Hart	Tony Bennett Celebrates 90	2016	
"Let's Do It (Let's Fall In Love)" †	None	Cole Porter	Love for Sale	2021	
"Let's Face the Music and Dance" †	Tony Bennett	Irving Berlin	Cheek to Cheek	2014	
"Look What I Found"	None	Lady Gaga; Mark Nilan Jr. Nick Monson; Paul "DJWS" Blair; Lukas Nelson; Aaron Raitiere	A Star Is Born	2018	
"LoveDrug"	None	Lady Gaga; Andrew Watt; Henry Walter; Michael Polansky	Mayhem	2025	
"Love for Sale" †	Tony Bennett	Cole Porter	Love for Sale	2021	
"Love Me Right"	None	Lady Gaga; BloodPop; Burns	Chromatica	2020	
"LoveGame"	None	Lady Gaga; RedOne	The Fame	2008	
"Lush Life" †	None	Billy Strayhorn	Cheek to Cheek	2014	
"Make Her Say" #	Kid Cudi; Kanye West; Common	Kid Cudi; Kanye West; Common; Lady Gaga; RedOne	Man on the Moon: The End of Day	2009	
"Manicure"	None	Lady Gaga; Paul "DJ White Shadow" Blair; Dino Zisis; Nick Monson	Artpop	2013	
"Marry the Night"	None	Lady Gaga; Fernando Garibay	Born This Way	2011	
"Mary Jane Holland"	None	Lady Gaga; Hugo Leclercq	Artpop	2013	
"Million Reasons"	None	Lady Gaga; Hillary Lindsey	Joanne	2016	
"Million Reasons" (Work Tape)	None	Lady Gaga; Hillary Lindsey	Joanne	2016	
"Money Honey"	None	Lady Gaga; Bilal Hajji; RedOne	The Fame	2008	
"Monster"	None	Lady Gaga; Nick Dresti; RedOne	The Fame Monster	2009	
"Murder My Heart" #	Michael Bolton	Lady Gaga; Michael Bolton; Michael Mani; Jordan Omley	One World One Love	2009	
"Music to My Eyes"	Bradley Cooper	Lady Gaga; Lukas Nelson	A Star Is Born	2018	
"Nature Boy" †	Tony Bennett	eden ahbez	Cheek to Cheek	2014	
"Night and Day" †	Tony Bennett	Cole Porter	Love for Sale	2021	
"Oh, When the Saints" †	None	Traditional; Lady Gaga; Michael Polansky	Harlequin	2024	
"Orange Colored Sky" †	None	Milton DeLugg; Willie Stein	A Very Gaga Holiday	2011	
"Paparazzi"	None	Lady Gaga; Rob Fusari	The Fame	2008	
"Paper Gangsta"	None	Lady Gaga; RedOne	The Fame	2008	
"Perfect Celebrity"	None	Lady Gaga; Andrew Watt; Mike Lévy; Henry Walter	Mayhem	2025	
"Perfect Illusion"	None	Lady Gaga; Kevin Parker; Mark Ronson	Joanne	2016	
"Plastic Doll"	None	Lady Gaga; BloodPop; Skrillex; Rami Yacoub; Jacob "Jkash" Hindlin	Chromatica	2020	
"Poker Face"	None	Lady Gaga; RedOne	The Fame	2008	
"Poker Face" (Live from the Apollo)	None	Lady Gaga; RedOne	Lady Gaga Live from the Apollo (as Broadcast on SiriusXM)	2019	
"Poker Face" (Piano & Voice Version)	None	Lady Gaga; RedOne	The Cherrytree Sessions	2009	
"The Queen"	None	Lady Gaga; Fernando Garibay	Born This Way	2011	
"Quicksand" #	Britney Spears	Lady Gaga; Fernando Garibay	Circus	2008	
"Rain on Me"	Ariana Grande	Lady Gaga; BloodPop; Ariana Grande; Matthew Burns; Nija Charles; Rami Yacoub Martin Joseph Léonard Bresso; Alexander Ridha	Chromatica	2020	
"Replay"	None	Lady Gaga; BloodPop; Matthew Burns	Chromatica	2020	
"Retro Dance Freak"	None	Lady Gaga; Rob Fusari	The Fame	2009	
"Runway"	Doechii	Lady Gaga; Andrew Watt; Bruno Mars; Dernst Emile II; Cirkut; Jayda Love; Doechii	The Devil Wears Prada 2	2026	
"Scheiße" • (Note: Gaga performs "Scheiße" in both English and faux-German.)	None	Lady Gaga; RedOne	Born This Way	2011	
"Sexxx Dreams"	None	Lady Gaga; Paul "DJ White Shadow" Blair; Martin Bresso; William Grigahcine	Artpop	2013	
"Shadow of a Man"	None	Lady Gaga; Andrew Watt; Henry Walter	Mayhem	2025	
"Shallow"	Bradley Cooper	Lady Gaga; Mark Ronson; Anthony Rossomando; Andrew Wyatt	A Star Is Born	2018	
"Shape of a Woman"	None	Lady Gaga; Andrew Watt; Henry Walter; Mike Lévy	The Devil Wears Prada 2	2026	
"Sine from Above"	Elton John	Lady Gaga; BloodPop; Elton John; Axel Hedfors; Rami Yacoub; Richard Zastenker; Vincent Pontare; Sebastian Ingrosso; Johannes Klahr; Benjamin Rice; Ryan Tedder; Salem Al Fakir	Chromatica	2020	
"Sine from Above" (Piano Version) (Note: Gaga, accompanied by a group of models, recorded a piano version of "Sine from Above" for Valentino's Voce Viva fragrance campaign.)	None	Lady Gaga; BloodPop; Elton John; Axel Hedfors; Rami Yacoub; Richard Zastenker; Vincent Pontare; Sebastian Ingrosso; Johannes Klahr; Benjamin Rice; Ryan Tedder; Salem Al Fakir	None	2020	
"Sinner's Prayer"	None	Lady Gaga; Josh Tillman; Mark Ronson; Thomas Brenneck	Joanne	2016	
"Smile" †	None	Charlie Chaplin; John Turner; Geoffrey Parsons	Harlequin	2024	
"So Happy I Could Die"	None	Lady Gaga; Nick Dresti; RedOne	The Fame Monster	2009	
"Sour Candy" • (Note: Blackpink performs "Sour Candy" in both English and Korean.)	Blackpink	Lady Gaga; BloodPop; Matthew Burns; Rami Yacoub; Madison Emiko Love; Teddy Park	Chromatica	2020	
"Speechless"	None	Lady Gaga ‡	The Fame Monster	2009	
"Stache" (Princess High Stache Mix)	Zedd	Anton Zaslavski; Lady Gaga	None	2012	
"Starstruck"	Space Cowboy; Flo Rida	Lady Gaga; Martin Kierszenbaum; Nick Dresti; Tramar Dillard	The Fame	2008	
"Stuck on Fuckin' You"	None	Lady Gaga ‡	None	2011	
"Stupid Love"	None	Lady Gaga; BloodPop; Max Martin; Martin Joseph Léonard Bresso; Ely Rise	Chromatica	2020	
"Summerboy"	None	Lady Gaga; Brian Kierulf; Josh Schwartz	The Fame	2008	
"Summer of Love" #	U2	Jacknife Lee; Ryan Tedder; Brent Kutzle	Songs of Experience	2017	
"Sweet Sounds of Heaven"	The Rolling Stones; Stevie Wonder	Keith Richards; Mick Jagger	Hackney Diamonds	2023	
"Swine"	None	Lady Gaga; Paul "DJ White Shadow" Blair; Dino Zisis; Nick Monson	Artpop	2013	
"Teeth"	None	Lady Gaga; Taja Riley	The Fame Monster	2009	
"Telephone"	Beyoncé	Lady Gaga; Beyoncé Knowles; LaShawn Daniels; Lazonate Franklin; Rodney Jerkins	The Fame Monster	2009	
"That's Entertainment" †	None	Arthur Schwartz	Harlequin	2024	
"That's Entertainment" (Film Version) †	None	Arthur Schwartz; Howard Dietz	Joker: Folie à Deux	2024	
"That's Life" †	None	Dean Kay; Kelly Gordon	Harlequin	2024	
"That's Life" (Film Version) †	None	Dean Kay; Kelly Gordon	Joker: Folie à Deux	2024	
"They All Laughed" †	Tony Bennett	George Gershwin; Ira Gershwin	Cheek to Cheek	2014	
"(They Long to Be) Close to You" (Film Version) †	Joaquin Phoenix	Burt Bacharach; Hal David	Joker: Folie à Deux	2024	
"Til It Happens to You"	None	Lady Gaga; Diane Warren	The Hunting Ground	2015	
"To Love Somebody" †	Joaquin Phoenix	Barry Gibb; Robin Gibb	Joker: Folie à Deux	2024	
"Vanish into You"	None	Lady Gaga; Andrew Watt; Henry Walter; Michael Polansky	Mayhem	2025	
"Vanity”	None	Lady Gaga; Rob Fusari; Thomas Kafafian	None	2008	
"Venus"	None	Lady Gaga; Paul "DJ White Shadow" Blair	Artpop	2013	
"Video Phone" (Extended Remix)	Beyoncé	Beyoncé Knowles; Lady Gaga; Sean Garrett; Shondrae Crawford	I Am... Sasha Fierce	2009	
"We're Doing a Sequel"	The Muppets; Tony Bennett	Bret McKenzie	Muppets Most Wanted	2014	
"White Christmas" †	None	Irving Berlin	A Very Gaga Holiday	2011	
"Why Did You Do That?"	None	Lady Gaga; Dianne Warren; Mark Nilan Jr. Nick Monson; Paul "DJWS" Blair	A Star Is Born	2018	
"Winter Wonderland" †	Tony Bennett	Felix Bernard; Richard B. Smith	None	2014	
"World Family Tree"	Melle Mel	Melle Mel; Lady Gaga	The Portal in the Park (bonus CD audio book)	2006	
"World on a String" †	None	Harold Arlen; Ted Koehler	Harlequin	2024	
"You and I"	None	Lady Gaga ‡	Born This Way	2011	
"You and I" (Live from the Apollo)	None	Lady Gaga ‡	Lady Gaga Live from the Apollo (as Broadcast on SiriusXM)	2019	
"You and I" (Live Version)	None	Lady Gaga ‡	A Very Gaga Holiday	2011	
"Your Song" †	None	Elton John; Bernie Taupin	Revamp: Reimagining the Songs of Elton John & Bernie Taupin	2018	
"You're the Top" †	Tony Bennett	Cole Porter	Love for Sale	2021	
"Zombieboy"	None	Lady Gaga; Andrew Watt; Henry Walter; James Fauntleroy	Mayhem	2025	
