= Teen Lust =

Teen Lust can refer to:

- Teen Lust (1979 film), a 1979 film
- Teen Lust (2014 film), a 2014 Canadian film
