= A Very Gaga Holiday =

EP / live album by Lady Gaga
- Released: November 22, 2011
- Recorded: October 2011
- Venues: Convent of the Sacred Heart (New York City)
- Genre: Jazz pop · Christmas
- Length: 14:21
- Labels: Streamline; Interscope; KonLive

Lady Gaga chronology
Born This Way: The Collection (2011)	A Very Gaga Holiday (2011)	Artpop (2013)

A Very Gaga Holiday is a live EP released by American singer-songwriter Lady Gaga, containing songs performed on the ABC holiday television special A Very Gaga Thanksgiving. It was made available for purchase in the United States on November 22, 2011, exclusively on the iTunes Store and Amazon, and on November 24 in the rest of the world. The EP is made up of jazz covers of the songs "Orange Colored Sky" and "White Christmas", the latter featuring an extra verse added by Gaga herself, and acoustic versions of "You and I" and "The Edge of Glory", both songs originally from the singer's studio album, Born This Way (2011). A recurring theme on the EP is Gaga stopping midway through singing to talk about background information on the songs with her listeners.

Following its release, A Very Gaga Holiday received mostly positive reviews from music critics. Reviewer Stephen Thomas Erlewine, writing for Allmusic, listed "White Christmas" and "Orange Colored Sky" as highlights. A Very Gaga Holiday entered the album charts of Canada, France, and the United States, while "White Christmas" entered the single charts of Belgium, Japan, and the United Kingdom.

== Background and recording ==
Gaga covered "Orange Colored Sky" during a surprise appearance at the Oak Room in New York City on September 29, 2010, and again on January 5, 2011. Brian Newman served as a guest performer on trumpet for performances at the Robin Hood Gala on May 9, 2011, to benefit the Robin Hood Foundation, and at BBC Radio 1's Big Weekend in Carlisle, England on May 15, 2011. Gaga later performed it on the ABC Christmas special A Very Gaga Thanksgiving, along with a jazz-influenced rendition of "White Christmas". Gaga added an extra verse to "White Christmas", explaining that she considered the original song "too short". The new verse describes a snowman with a carrot nose and charcoal eyes, whom Gaga reassures that Santa Claus is on his way. The songs on A Very Gaga Holiday were recorded during the shooting of A Very Gaga Thanksgiving at the Convent of the Sacred Heart, New York City.

On November 22, 2011, A Very Gaga Holiday was released as a digital EP. Both "Orange Colored Sky" and "White Christmas" were included in the release, along with two other tracks which were also performed: minimalist versions of Gaga's 2011 singles "The Edge of Glory" and "You and I", both songs which originally featured on Gaga's second studio album, Born This Way (2011). The EP's release followed the opening of Gaga's holiday workshop at Barneys New York, which Gaga inaugurated on November 21, 2011. It was released in the United States to the iTunes Store and Amazon and had a worldwide release to iTunes after four days.

== Composition ==
Gaga's cover of "White Christmas" is a "jazzy rendition" and features an extra verse about a snowman. Halfway into the cover, before beginning the new verse, Gaga says, "So as you can tell, I'm very outgoing and a little bit shy, but I've decided that this song is just too short. It's such a beautiful Christmas song but it's only one verse, so I added an extra one." "You and I" is devoid of the musical arrangements from the version in Born This Way, and features instrumentation from a piano and a trumpet, which is played halfway through the song. From time to time, Gaga shouts the word "America" while singing the song. Her acoustic version of "The Edge of Glory" begins with a monologue, explaining her dedication of the song to her grandfather: "It's the second Thanksgiving I'm spending without my grandpa, and I wrote this song about him, so here it is. So Grandma, if you're watching at home, this one's for you." Her acoustic rendition of "The Edge of Glory" begins with a dedication to her late grandfather: "It's the second Thanksgiving I'm spending without my grandpa, and I wrote this song about him [...] So Grandma, if you're watching at home, this one's for you." Following the first chorus, Gaga stops playing her piano and tells a story about Italian cookies. A recurring theme for the songs is Gaga stopping midway through singing to engage in conversation with the listeners.

== Release and reception ==
Professional ratings
Review scores
Source	Rating
AllMusic	3/5 stars
Entertainment Weekly	Positive
Evigshed Magazine	Positive

In the United States, the EP debuted at number 52 on the Billboard 200 with sales of 22,000 copies, for the week ending December 10, 2011. The same week, the special also affected Gaga's second studio album, Born This Way, which moved up the Billboard 200 chart from position 72 to 21, with sales of 47,000 copies (up 416% from previous week). As of April 2016, A Very Gaga Holiday has sold 44,000 copies in the US according to Nielsen SoundScan. Gaga's version of "White Christmas" entered the UK Singles Chart at number 87, for the week ending December 3, 2011. The same version also entered the Belgium (Flanders) Singles Chart at number 86, for the week ending dated December 24, 2011, and the Japan Hot 100 singles at number 93. In Canada, A Very Gaga Holiday debuted at number 74 on the Canadian Albums Chart and in France, it entered the SNEP Download Albums Chart at number 26.

Stephen Thomas Erlewine from AllMusic awarded the EP three out of five stars, saying that the release was an "attractive holiday bauble" and that although Gaga's main persona was about authenticity, she appeared to "push her affectations" much more than required on the songs. Erlewine picked "White Christmas" and "Orange Colored Sky" as his top choices from the EP. Evigshed Magazine's Sylvia Lesas complimented the musical arrangement of the tracks, saying that Gaga's vocals were a highlight of the EP and adding, "'The Edge of Glory' featuring beautiful piano line gives me chills. It is a truly moving version. [Gaga] makes every song special." Erin Strecker from Entertainment Weekly gave a glowing review of the release, explaining that Gaga's fans might have been expecting a release like A Very Gaga Holiday which gave prominence to the singer's vocals. She added that the songs showed "how much her voice really is well-suited for the big-band and jazz-era stylings on these tunes".

== Track listing ==
A Very Gaga Holiday track listing
No.	Title	Writer(s)	Length
1.	"White Christmas"	Irving Berlin; Lady Gaga	3:22
2.	"Orange Colored Sky"	Milton DeLugg; Willie Stein	2:33
3.	"You and I"	Lady Gaga	3:34
4.	"The Edge of Glory"	Lady Gaga; Fernando Garibay; DJ White Shadow	4:52
Total length:			14:21

== Personnel ==
Credits and personnel adapted from digital booklet.

- Lady Gaga – vocals, producer, piano
- Phil DeTolve – sound editor, recording at Convent of the Sacred Heart, New York City
- Brian Riordan – sound re-recording mixer
- Alex Smith – piano
- Brian Newman – trumpet
- Paul Francis – drums
- Scott Ritchie – bass
- Steven Kortyka – saxophone

== Charts ==
=== Weekly charts ===
Weekly chart performance for A Very Gaga Holiday
Chart (2011)	Peak position
Canadian Albums (Billboard)	74
French Digital Albums (SNEP)	26
Italy (FIMI)	66
US Billboard 200	52
US Top Holiday Albums (Billboard)	9
US Digital Albums (Billboard)	9

=== "White Christmas" ===
Weekly chart performance for "White Christmas"
Chart (2011)	Peak position
Belgium (Ultratip Bubbling Under Flanders)	83
Japan Hot 100 (Billboard)	93
UK Singles (Official Charts)	87

== Release history ==
Release dates and formats for A Very Gaga Holiday
Country	Date	Format	Label	Ref.
United States	November 22, 2011	Digital download	Interscope Records	
Worldwide	November 24, 2011	Digital download	Interscope Records	
