= Underground (play) =

- Original language: English
- Written by: Michael Sloane
- Characters: 9
- Genre: Thriller
- Setting: London Underground train carriage

Premiere
- Date: 1983
- Place: Prince of Wales Theatre, London

Underground, a thriller written by Michael Sloane (sometimes spelt Sloan) and produced at the Royal Alexandra Theatre, Toronto and following a UK tour, at the Prince of Wales Theatre, London, opening on 4 July 1983. It was directed by Simon Williams.

== Plot ==
Described by the script publisher as follows:

A tense and claustrophobic thriller emerges when twelve people become trapped in a London Underground train carriage. The fear of being trapped underground with very little air and apparently no rescue service underway becomes very real as we witness the initial panic and fear experienced by the passengers. As the temperature rises and tempers fray, an electrical shortage on the train shrouds a brutal murder and when the lights eventually come up we are faced with a new and more chilling revelation – there is a murderer aboard and nowhere to run.

== Cast ==
At the Prince of Wales Theatre, London, July 1983

- Raymond Burr as Jim Maclaine
- Alfred Marks as Tony Porter
- Gerald Flood as Bill Fellows
- Peter Wyngarde as Alexander Howard
- Linda Hayden
- Ian Cullen as Graham Craig
- Ronald Leigh-Hunt as Tramp
- Elspeth March as Felicity Allender
- Marc Sinden as Michael Preston
- Liz Edmiston as Sue Thomas
- Eric Carte as John Brooks
- Glynn Mills as Guard
