= Orange Colored Sky =

Song by Milton Delugg and Willie Stein

Song
- Published: 1950, by Frank Music
- Songwriters: Milton Delugg and Willie Stein

"Orange Colored Sky" is a popular song written by Milton Delugg and Willie Stein and published in 1950. The first known recording was on July 11, 1950, on King Records catalog number 15061, with Janet Brace singing and Milton Delugg conducting the orchestra.

== Nat King Cole recording ==
The best-known version of the song was recorded by Nat King Cole (with Stan Kenton's orchestra) on August 16, 1950, and released by Capitol Records as catalog number 1184. It first reached the Billboard Best Seller chart on September 22, 1950, and lasted 13 weeks on the chart, peaking at number 11. (Some sites list a 1945 date for this recording, but this is apparently in error.) A number of other singers have recorded it, including Cole's daughter, Natalie.

== Other recordings ==
- Doris Day's recording the song with the Page Cavanaugh Trio on August 21, 1950, was released by Columbia Records as catalog number 38980 on a 78 and 6–811 on 45.
- Danny Kaye and Patty Andrews recorded the song on September 28, 1950, in a version released by Decca Records as catalog number 27261.
- The recording by Jerry Lester was released by Coral Records as catalog number 60325. It debuted on the Billboard Best Seller chart on November 24, 1950, and lasted one week in the chart, peaking at No. 30. Lester hosted the late-night NBC series Broadway Open House, with co-writer Delugg as musical director. "Orange Colored Sky" has been said to be one of the first songs to become a hit through television exposure.
- In 1950, Betty Hutton recorded with the Pete Rugolo Orchestra, RCA Victor 20–3908, and the song peaked at 24 on the charts.
- In Australia, Larry Stellar, with Les Welch and his orchestra, recorded the song in January 1951. It was by Pacific Records as catalog number 10-0052.
- Screamin' Jay Hawkins' version of the song is the first track on his 1958 album At Home With Screamin' Jay Hawkins.
- Actor Burt Ward of Batman fame recorded a number of tracks produced by Frank Zappa in 1966, including "Orange Colored Sky", which was released as a 7" single on MGM Records.
- The song is the title track of a 1971 album by German songwriter and composer Bert Kaempfert.
- Tony-nominated actress Alison Fraser included the song on her solo album A New York Romance.
- English singer-songwriter Richard Thompson included the song on his live album 1000 Years of Popular Music.
- Japanese jazz singer Meg covered it on her 2006 album Grace.
- In 2006, a version of the song by Paul Anka was included on the soundtrack of the film Confetti.
- Canadian crooner Michael Bublé recorded a version as a bonus track on his 2007 album Call Me Irresponsible.
- Lady Gaga covered the song during a surprise appearance at The Oak Room in New York City on September 29, 2010, and again on January 5, 2011. Brian Newman was a guest performer on trumpet for her performances at the Robin Hood Gala on May 9, 2011, to benefit the Robin Hood Foundation; and on May 15, 2011, at BBC Radio 1's Big Weekend in Carlisle, England. Gaga's further performances of the song included the ABC special A Very Gaga Thanksgiving; and she recorded it for her first Christmas EP, A Very Gaga Holiday.

== Popular culture ==
- Adam West performed the song live in his Batman costume on a 1966 episode of Hollywood Palace.
- The song was sung by American actress Lynda Carter with various Muppets in her episode of The Muppet Show.
- In the movie The Majestic, Jim Carrey's character listens to the tune while driving his convertible in Hollywood.
- The song is featured in the Fallout video game series, with Fallout 4 and Fallout 76 featuring the Nat King Cole version on the in-game radio station. Additionally, the song is also featured in the opening scene of the Fallout TV Series.
- The song is included in the score of the musical revue Unforgettable: The Nat King Cole Story, which premiered at West End's Garrick Theatre in 1995.
- The song is included in the score of the musical Lights Out: Nat “King” Cole, which debuted on the West coast at Geffen Playhouse in 2019 and later debuted off-Broadway at New York Theatre Workshop in 2025.
