= The Joke's on Us =

Canadian game show

- Created by: Willie Stein; Nat Ligerman
- Presented by: Monty Hall
- Starring: Sylvie Garant
- Announcer: Sandy Hoyt
- Country of origin: Canada

Production
- Production locations: Global Television; Toronto, Ontario
- Running time: 26 Minutes
- Production company: Take a Break Productions

Original release
- Network: Global Television Network; Syndication
- Release: September 9, 1983 – February 24, 1984

The Joke's On Us is a Canadian game show that aired from September 1983 to 1984. It was hosted by Monty Hall, joined by Sylvie Garant as assistant very early on in the run, with Sandy Hoyt as the show's announcer. Taped at Showline Milton Stage in Toronto, Ontario in association with the Global Television Network, the show was created and produced by two American game show veterans, Willie Stein and Nat Ligerman. Each episode featured a rotating panel of four comedians.

== History ==
Monty Hall was selected by Global Television Network to host The Joke's on Us in early 1983. Hall accepted the offer as he noted that NBC had repeatedly contacted him with interest in reviving Let's Make a Deal, of which he was both creator and host, but he refused as he thought that show's format was dated. Hall taped 25 episodes in early 1983 with the intent of testing the show's viability and intent for syndication in the United States as well as Canada. The show debuted on September 9, 1983 with Nipsey Russell, Jack Carter, Marty Allen, and Maurice LaMarche as the first guests.

== Rules ==
The show pitted two contestants against each other. Each took turns listening to a joke told by one member of the panel, while the other panel members each delivered a different punchline to the joke. The contestant had to determine which of the punchlines was the original punchline to the joke. If correct, that player scored; otherwise, the points went to his/her opponent. Values were 5 points in round 1, 10 points in round 2, and 50 points in the 3rd and final round (which was played slightly differently from the first two: Monty himself read the joke, 3 of the panelists supplied punchlines, and both contestants guessed on the same joke. The 4th panelist revealed the correct punchline). The player with the most points at the end of this round won the game and $250; in the event of a tie, a tie-breaker was played in the same way as a high-low question on Card Sharks.

Later episodes featured an all-cash format where correct answers were worth $25 in round 1 and $50 in round 2. The final joke was worth $100. Unlike the first format, the opponent did not score for an incorrect answer.

== Add-a-Word Round ==
The winner played the "Add-a-Word" bonus round, based on an old party game. A phrase such as "I always forget my..." would appear on a board, under which eight letters would be uncovered one at a time. The celebrities had to go around twice adding a word to the chain that began with the next letter. For the above example, if "A" were uncovered, the first celebrity might say "I always forget my apples." Then if a "B" were uncovered, the second would have to say "I always forget my apples and my balloons." This would continue for all eight letters.

If the celebrity could not remember a previous word, the contestant could tell them. After all eight words were given, the contestant then had to repeat the entire phrase. The celebrities could not tell the contestant the next word, but could mime or gesture to assist. The contestant had 60 seconds to build the chain and repeat it in order to win $500.

== Critical reception ==
Reception to the show was largely negative. An uncredited review in The Toronto Star found the show lacking in humor and criticized the obscurity of some of the guests. Waterloo Region Record writer Bonnie Malleck called the show "long on whiskered old shtick and short on everthing else". Writing for The Ottawa Citizen, Jim Slotek called the show "the most dubious event" among Canadian television debuts that year, also panning the show's humor and low budget.
