= A Very Gaga Thanksgiving =

Television special

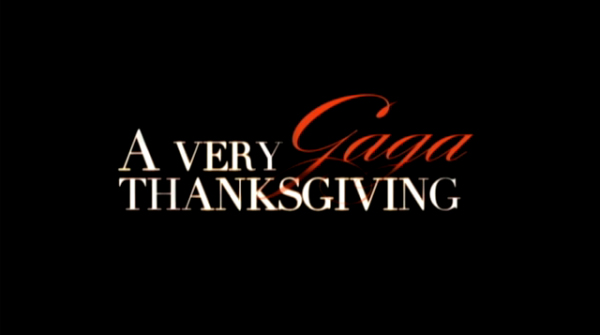
- Title card
- Directed by: Lady Gaga
- Starring: Lady Gaga
- Country of origin: United States

Production
- Executive producers: Lady Gaga; Vincent Herbert; Troy Carter; Mo Morrison; Rudy Bednar; David Saltz
- Producers: Steven Johnson; Nicole Ehrlich
- Editors: Mike Polito; Joel Viertel
- Running time: 90 minutes
- Production companies: Factory Films; Lincoln Square; Streamline; Interscope; Panther; Kon Live

Original release
- Network: ABC
- Release: November 24, 2011

A Very Gaga Thanksgiving is a Thanksgiving television special that originally aired on November 24, 2011, in the United States on the ABC network. Conceived and directed by Lady Gaga, it discusses her personal life and the inspiration behind her music. A 30-second preview of the special premiered on November 20, 2011, on Lady Gaga's YouTube channel. Principal photography took place at the Convent of the Sacred Heart in New York City.

The program features guest appearances by Katie Couric, Art Smith, and Tony Bennett. Gaga performed stripped down, acoustic versions of five songs from her second studio album, Born This Way, along with two Christmas songs and a duet with Bennett. The special received critical acclaim and gave ABC its best ratings in four years for its respective time slot on Thanksgiving Day. At the 2012 Dorian Awards, the special was nominated in the category of Best TV Musical Program of the Year but did not win the award. A live EP of performances from the special, titled A Very Gaga Holiday, was made available for purchase from the iTunes Store. The EP debuted on the Billboard 200 albums chart in the United States at number 52.

== Synopsis ==
Katie Couric interviews Lady Gaga about her life and the inspiration behind her music at the Convent of the Sacred Heart in Manhattan, the school she attended as a child. Gaga also performs nine songs to a small audience of friends and family, including "Born This Way", "Marry the Night", "You and I", "Hair" and "The Edge of Glory", as well as covers of Irving Berlin's holiday classic "White Christmas" and Nat King Cole's "Orange Colored Sky". She also sings a duet with Tony Bennett of "The Lady Is a Tramp", originally from the 1937 musical comedy Babes in Arms, featuring the work of Gaga's trumpeter, Brian Newman. Gaga sings "Bad Romance" onstage during a different scene. American chef Art Smith makes a turkey dinner and waffles with Gaga. In another scene, a small group of children gather around her as she blows glitter on them.

== Production ==
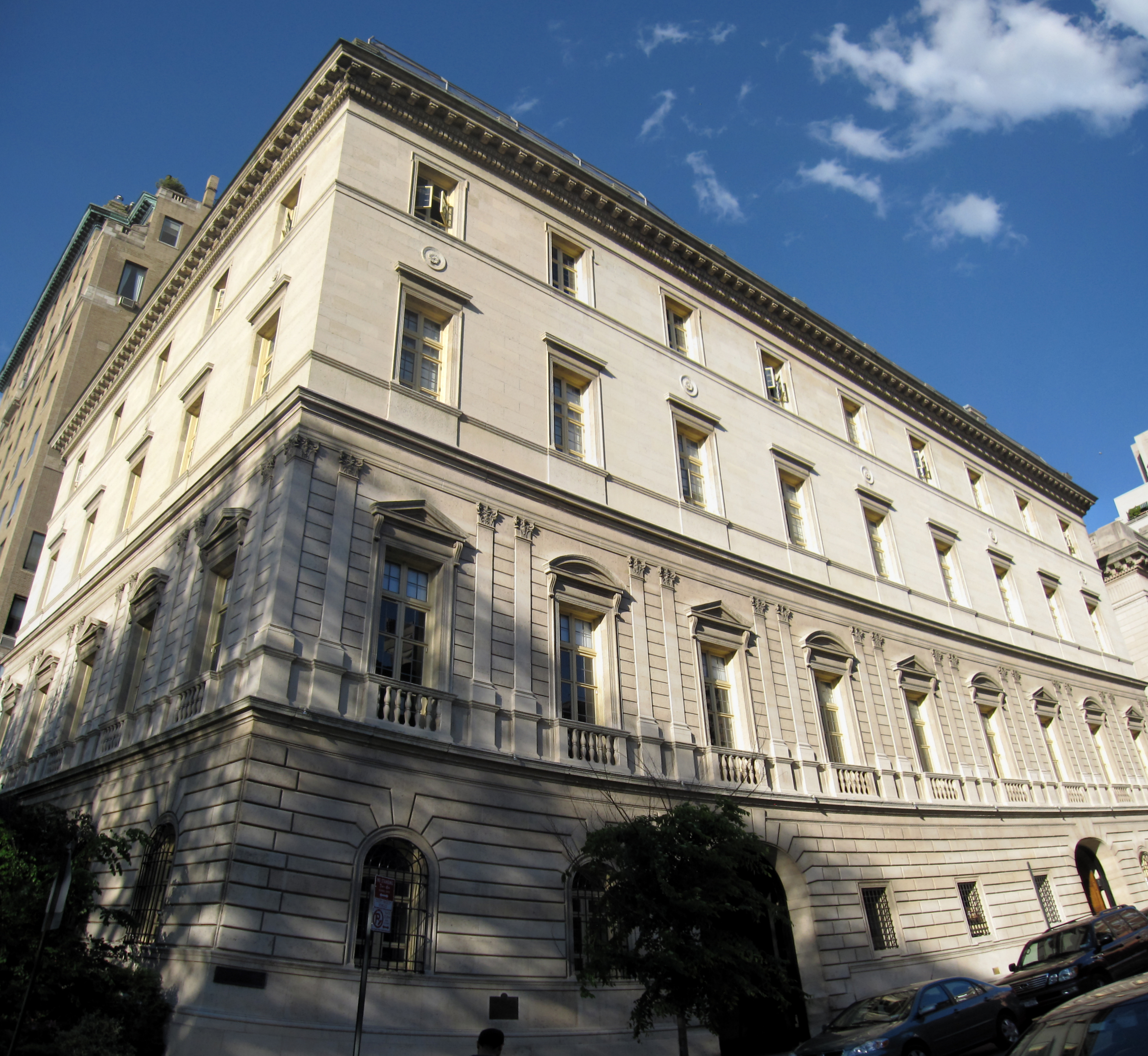
Filming for the special took place at the Convent of the Sacred Heart in New York City.

A Very Gaga Thanksgiving was conceived and directed by Gaga; it was produced by Steven Johnson, Rudy Bendar, and David Saltz. Principal photography took place at the Convent of the Sacred Heart in New York City. Gaga told Women's Wear Daily: "My dad will be so excited. I actually directed it. It's the first of two things I directed. I directed this as well as the video for 'Marry The Night,' my new single... So we'll be watching that and eating turkey and doing what all New Yorkers do, which is getting ready for every window to be filled with Christmas cheer the next day."

Gaga received dresses designed by Giorgio Armani, Stéphane Rolland, Azzedine Alaïa, and Martin Grant. A promotional photo of Gaga was released that shows her "going full ice princess", which Erin Strecker of Entertainment Weekly presumed would be her primary apparel. In a press statement early in November 2011, Couric commented that the special's story will amaze viewers and show a different side of Gaga:

This is a chance to see more of who she is beneath the wild costumes and staged musical numbers ... Lady Gaga as a high school student still bruised by being excluded from the party, Lady Gaga as a devoted daughter and caring sister, Lady Gaga as a 25-year-old woman embracing fame and fortune that seemed to come overnight. She will impress you, delight you and surprise you.

Smith commented, "It's important for people to see that this amazing woman [Gaga] has a family that supports her." A 30-second preview of the special was released on November 20, 2011, on Lady Gaga's YouTube channel. A later three-minute teaser trailer showed Gaga making crafts and sharing holiday food with third-grade children. The special aired on November 24, 2011, at 9:30 pm ET.

== Reception ==
=== Ratings ===
A Very Gaga Thanksgiving aired on November 24, 2011, in the United States on ABC. It attracted 5.749 million viewers and garnered a 1.8/5 rating in the 18–49 demographic in its first hour. Gaga's special aired simultaneously with reruns of The Simpsons on FOX, Person of Interest on CBS, and The Secret Circle on The CW. In its second hour, total viewership and ratings declined to 5.388 million viewers and a 1.6/5 rating in the 18–49 demographic, despite airing at the same time as a recap of the Macy's Thanksgiving Day Parade on NBC and a rerun of The Mentalist on CBS. A Very Gaga Thanksgiving failed to beat other Thanksgiving specials in the ratings, including A Charlie Brown Thanksgiving. The program had the highest rating in the 18–49 demographic in its time slot. Total viewership increased by 23% (1.3 million viewers) from the previous year's Thanksgiving special, singer Beyoncé's 2009 concert I Am... World Tour. It gave ABC its best ratings in four years for the Thanksgiving Day time slot.

=== Critical response ===
The program was met with acclaim from television critics. Calling it engaging, Ken Tucker of Entertainment Weekly opined that A Very Gaga Thanksgiving was "disarmingly direct, sincere, and unpretentious". Tucker praised Lady Gaga's performances in the television special, saying they were a "warm, low-key collection of solid performances of her hits and pop standards". Dave Itzkoff of The New York Times said that while viewers might have thought they were viewing a "dream or a hallucination", they were watching "an actual holiday special". The Guardian 's Hadley Freeman wrote, "It was all inoffensive, silly and knowing, and laid down the groundwork for what looks likely to be the singer's next career: as America's in-house eccentric, fearless enough to satirize the country's traditions but canny enough to know that while you can deface as many Irving Berlin songs as you like, the turkey is non-negotiable." In contrast, A Very Gaga Thanksgiving was panned by Jen Carlson of Gothamist, who felt that it was a "very transparent marketing ploy for the new Gaga holiday release".

The Washington Post's Sarah Anne Hughes wrote that she was shocked at how traditional Gaga was in the television special. Cavan Sieczkowski of the International Business Times described A Very Gaga Thanksgiving as a "charming throwback to holiday specials of times past". Sieczkowski praised the outfits and drew comparisons to those of Elizabeth Taylor and Ava Gardner. Joe Drake agreed, writing on TVology: "This special was [fabulous]. I have nothing bad to say about it. Lady Gaga proves, yet again, that she is the artist of our generation. Her talent, beauty, personality and spirit make her such an incredible person to look up to and respect." At the 2012 Dorian Awards, the special was nominated in the category of Best TV Musical Program of the Year but lost to Glee and Gaga's own concert special, Lady Gaga Presents the Monster Ball Tour: At Madison Square Garden.

== Music ==
On November 22, 2011, iTunes Store began selling an exclusive EP of the live performances from the special, which included "White Christmas", "Orange Colored Sky", "You and I", and "The Edge of Glory". The EP was made available for purchase only. Titled A Very Gaga Holiday, it entered the Billboard 200 chart at number 52, selling 22,000 copies, and number nine on the Top Holiday Albums chart. The same week, the special also increased sales of Gaga's second studio album, Born This Way, which moved up the Billboard 200 chart from 72 to 21, with sales of 47,000 copies (up 416% from the previous week).

== See also ==
- List of Thanksgiving television specials
