= Perry Lang =

Television director and actor

Perry Lang (born December 24, 1959, in Palo Alto, California) is an American director, writer, and actor.

== Acting ==
Lang has appeared in several films and television shows, such as Teen Lust, and directed himself in Men of War (1994). He had roles in Alligator (1980), Eight Men Out (1988), and Sunshine State (2002) — all written and directed by John Sayles. He also appeared in 1941 (1979), The Big Red One (1980), The Hearse (1980), Cattle Annie and Little Britches (1981), Body and Soul (1981), Tag: The Assassination Game (1982), O'Hara's Wife (1982), Spring Break (1983), Sahara (1983), Jocks (1987), and Jennifer 8 (1992).

== Directing ==
He has directed episodes of television series such as Cracker, Arli$$, ER, Millennium, Dawson's Creek, NYPD Blue, Nash Bridges, Fantasy Island, Weeds, Gilmore Girls, Army Wives, The Twilight Zone, Alias, Las Vegas, Jack & Bobby, Everwood, and Greek. He also directed himself in Men of War (1994).

== Family ==
He is married to former actress Sage Parker-Lang, with whom he has two children.

== Filmography ==
=== Film ===
Perry Lang film credits
Year	Title	Role	Notes
1977	The Date	Rob	16mm film
1978	Big Wednesday	Tall Kid	
1978	Teen Lust	Terry Davis	
1979	A Great Ride	Jim Dancer	
1979	1941	Dennis DeSoto	
1980	The Hearse	Paul Gordon	
1980	The Big Red One	Private Kaiser - 1st Squad	
1980	Alligator	Officer Jim Kelly	
1981	Cattle Annie and Little Britches	Elrod	
1981	Body and Soul	Charles Golphin	
1982	Tag: The Assassination Game	Frank English	
1982	O'Hara's Wife	Rob O'Hara	
1983	Spring Break	Adam	
1983	A Rose for Emily	Deputy Binford	(Short)
1983	Sahara	Andy	
1983	Flyers	Tim Johnson	(Short)
1986	Jocks	Jeff	
1988	Mortuary Academy	Sam Grimm	
1988	Jailbird Rock	Denny	
1988	Eight Men Out	Fred McMullin	
1990	Jacob's Ladder	Jacob's Assailant	
1990	Little Vegas	Steve	
1991	Grave Images	Byron	(Video)
1992	Dead On: Relentless II	Ralph Boshi	(Video)
1992	Jennifer 8	Travis	
1994	Men of War	Lyle	
2002	Sunshine State	Greg	

=== Television ===
Perry Lang television credits
Year	Title	Role	Notes
1977	ABC Afterschool Specials	Hewitt Calder	Episode: "Hewitt's Just Different"
1977	The Fitzpatricks	Buddy Bonkers	Episode: "Say Goodbye to Buddy Bonkers"
1977	James at 15		Episode: "The Apple Tree, the Singing and the Gold"
1978	What Really Happened to the Class of '65?	Brian	Episode: "The Most Likely to Succeed"
1978	Police Story	Al	Episode: "A Chance to Live"
1978	Zuma Beach	Billy	TV movie
1979	How the West Was Won	Willie Johnson	Episode: "The Innocent"
1979	The Death of Ocean View Park	Billy Robbins	TV movie
1979	Flying High	Roberts	Episode: "The Challenges"
1980	A Rumor of War	Woodward	miniseries
1982	M*A*S*H	Sandler	Episode: "Hey, Look Me Over"
1983–1984	Bay City Blues	"Frenchy Nuckles"	8 episodes
1985	The Equalizer	Bobby	Episode: "The Children's Song"
1986	Miami Vice	Skip Mueller	Episode: "Trust Fund Pirates"
1987	Tales from the Darkside	Sandy Darhaus	Episode: "My Own Place"
1988	Monsters	Lenny	Episode: "Holly's House"
1989	China Beach	Lieutenant Commander Frederick Emmanuel	Episode: "Crossing the Great Water"
1990	Revealing Evidence: Stalking the Honolulu Strangler		TV movie
1990	The Bakery	Wes "Hotshot" Williams	TV movie
1992	Civil Wars	Phil Partridge	Episode: "A Partridge in a Pair's Tree"
1994	Betrayed by Love	Earl McNally	TV movie
1995	The Commish	Martin Swope	Episode: "The Trial"
1995	Dead Weekend	Captain	TV movie
1996	NYPD Blue	The Bartender	Episode: "Girl Talk"
1997	Nash Bridges	Justin Previn	Episode: "Most Wanted"
2000	Popular	TV Director	Episode: "All About Adam"
2002	Glory Days		Episode: "The Devil Made Me Do It"
2010	Blue Belle	David	
