= The Majestic (film) =

2001 film by Frank Darabont

- Theatrical release poster
- Directed by: Frank Darabont
- Written by: Michael Sloane
- Produced by: Frank Darabont
- Starring: Jim Carrey; Bob Balaban; Brent Briscoe; Jeffrey DeMunn; Amanda Detmer; Allen Garfield; Hal Holbrook; Laurie Holden; Martin Landau; Ron Rifkin; David Ogden Stiers; James Whitmore
- Cinematography: David Tattersall
- Edited by: Jim Page
- Music by: Mark Isham
- Production companies: Castle Rock Entertainment; Village Roadshow Pictures; NPV Entertainment; Darkwoods Productions
- Distributed by: Warner Bros. Pictures
- Release date: December 21, 2001 (United States)
- Running time: 153 minutes
- Country: United States
- Language: English
- Budget: $72 million
- Box office: $37.3 million

The Majestic is a 2001 American romantic drama film directed and produced by Frank Darabont, written by Michael Sloane, and starring Jim Carrey in the leading role, Bob Balaban, Brent Briscoe, Jeffrey DeMunn, Amanda Detmer, Allen Garfield, Hal Holbrook, Laurie Holden, Martin Landau, Ron Rifkin, David Ogden Stiers, and James Whitmore. The film depicts a 1950s Hollywood screenwriter suspected of being a communist. After suffering amnesia as the result of a road accident, he is taken in by the residents of a small town, who mistake him for a local resident who went missing in action while serving in the military during World War II.

Carrey's performance was a significant departure from his previous work, which until then had mostly been comedy films. The film premiered on December 11, 2001, and was released in the United States by Warner Bros. Pictures on December 21, 2001. It received generally negative reviews from critics and grossed $37.3 million worldwide against a budget of $72 million, losing an estimated $35 million.

== Plot ==
In 1951 while McCarthyism goes unchecked, Peter Appleton is a Hollywood screenwriter. His agent Leo Kubelsky and his attorney Kevin Bannerman relay he was labeled a communist for attending a "Bread Instead of Bullets" antiwar club meeting during college to impress a girl he was wooing. Peter's new film Ashes to Ashes is delayed for months, his movie star girlfriend Sandra Sinclair dumps him, and the studio drops his contract. Peter gets drunk and drives up the California coast, accidentally crashing off a bridge to avoid an opossum. After striking his head, he regains consciousness on the beach, experiencing amnesia.

Stan Keller finds and helps Peter to the nearby town of Lawson. Doc Stanton tends his wounds as Sheriff Cecil Coleman is called. Harry Trimble arrives, believing Peter is his son Luke who went missing in action during World War II, sometime after D-Day. Coleman tells Doc to "break it to her gently," referring to Doc's daughter, Adele. Hesitantly, Peter accepts being treated as Luke by the townspeople, led by Mayor Ernie Cole, and gets to know Adele, who had been engaged to Luke the night before going to war nine and a half years earlier.

Peter helps renovate the derelict Majestic movie theater. Veteran Bob Leffert is skeptical that Peter is Luke, fearing he will disappoint the town further, after having lost sixty young men to the war. Nevertheless, Peter's theater restoration invigorates the townspeople, and encourages Mayor Cole to display a memorial commissioned by President Franklin D. Roosevelt, which Lawson did not previously have the heart to display.

Peter's disappearance reinforces House Un-American Activities Committee member Elvin Clyde's belief that Peter is a communist, sending federal agents Ellerby and Saunders to apprehend him. They pick up the trail when Joey finds Peter's car on the beach.

Peter's amnesia ends while The Majestic shows his first movie Sand Pirates of the Sahara, and he discovers his name on the poster. Harry suffers a heart attack, which Stanton says will be fatal. Peter decides to allow Harry to die believing he really is his son Luke.

After the funeral, Peter tells Adele the truth, which she already suspected. Federal agents and state police officers arrive with Leo, Ellery and Saunders, who reveal Peter's identity to the whole town. Frank is summoned to the congressional hearing in Los Angeles. Leo advises Peter to name other communists to "purge" his own "indiscretions."

The Majestic's usher Emmett reveals, he knew Peter wasn't Luke after hearing Peter play "that fine roadhouse boogie" at the "welcome-home dance" because Luke played classical music, not jazz. But Emmett remained silent because "the town needed Luke" to recover from post-war grief.

Peter goes to the cemetery to return Luke's Medal of Honor to his memorial case. He and Adele argue. He decides to submit to the committee to be removed from the Hollywood blacklist, but she wants him to fight as Luke would have done. At the train station, Doc gives Peter a package from Adele. It is a copy of the Constitution and Luke's WWII letter telling Adele his readiness to die to honor their cause, to beat down bullies who rise up.

In Los Angeles, Peter changes his mind and testimony to the committee, which is broadcast by radio to Lawson citizens. He confronts Clyde and Congressman Doyle, giving an impassioned speech about American ideals, reading from the First Amendment to the United States Constitution concerning freedom of speech, while holding Luke's Medal of Honor. Peter sways the crowd and newsreporters, compelling the committee to release him. Kevin tells Peter it was Lucille Angstrom, for whom he attended the "Bread Instead of Bullets" meeting, who named him to the committee. Peter resumes his screenwriting career, but he rejects the studio executives' ridiculous ideas and leaves Hollywood.

After sending Adele a telegram, Peter returns to Lawson, fearing Adele will not be there to greet him. Instead, he receives a hero's welcome from the town's citizens, who have come to respect him as an individual. Peter resumes management of The Majestic, marries Adele, and they have a son together, as revealed by photos in their apartment above the theater.

== Cast ==
- Jim Carrey as Peter Appleton/Luke Trimble, a screenwriter who flees Hollywood after being accused of having communist sympathies. He loses his memory after a car accident and is mistaken for Luke Trimble, a soldier feared to be missing in action during WWII.
- Bob Balaban as Elvin Clyde, a member of Congress presiding over the Congressional hearing to interrogate Peter
- Brent Briscoe as Cecil Coleman, the sheriff of Lawson
- Jeffrey DeMunn as Ernie Cole, the Mayor of Lawson who is also a pharmacist
- Amanda Detmer as Sandra Sinclair, Peter's movie star ex-girlfriend who plays Emily in Sand Pirates of the Sahara
- Allen Garfield as Leo Kubelsky, Peter's Hollywood talent agent
- Hal Holbrook as Congressman Doyle, a member of the Congressional hearing
- Laurie Holden as Adele Stanton, the girlfriend of Luke Trimble
- Martin Landau as Harry Trimble, the father of Luke Trimble
- Ron Rifkin as Kevin Bannerman, Peter's studio attorney
- David Ogden Stiers as Doc Stanton, the resident doctor of Lawson and the father of Adele
- James Whitmore as Stan Keller, the elderly clock store owner who finds Peter on the beach following his car accident
- Gerry Black as Emmett Smith, the usher and repairman of The Majestic
- Karl Bury as Bob Leffert, a one-handed veteran and diner chef at Mabel's who knew Luke Trimble
- Catherine Dent as Mabel, a waitress and proprietor of her self-titled diner in Lawson
- Shawn Doyle as Federal Agent Saunders, a federal agent searching for Peter
- Brian Howe as:
  - Carl Leffert, the cousin of Bob Leffert
  - The Head of the Studio
- Chelcie Ross as Avery Wyatt, the owner of a hardware store in Lawson
- Daniel von Bargen as Federal Agent Ellerby, a federal agent searching for Peter
- Susan Willis as Irene Terwilliger, the candy server at The Majestic's snack bar and a music tutor
- Matt G. Wiens as Spencer Wyatt, the son of Avery Wyatt who plays the clarinet in the town band and helps out in his father's store
- Mario Roccuzzo as Jerry, a bartender at a bar that Peter visits before his car accident
- Frank Collison as a man who gives Peter a subpoena to appear before the Congressional committee in Los Angeles, California
- Bill Gratton as Daley, a resident of Lawson
- Ginger Williams as Louise, a candy usher at Grauman's Chinese Theater
- Csilia Horvath as Nurse Muriel, a nurse who works for Doc Stanton
- April Ortiz as Vera, a resident of Lawson
- Scotty Leavenworth as Joey, the kid who finds Peter's car on the beach
- Bob Wells as the reverend who presides over Harry's funeral

Sand Pirates of the Sahara cameo performers

- Bruce Campbell as Roland the Intrepid Explorer, the main protagonist portrayed by actor Brett Armstrong
- Cliff Curtis as The Evil But Handsome Prince Khalid, the main antagonist portrayed by actor Ramón Jamón
- Michael Sloane as the Kindly Old Professor Meredith

=== Voices ===
- Earl Boen as the voice of the Newsreel Announcer
- Matt Damon as the voice of Luke Trimble, the soldier whom Peter is believed to be. His voice is heard as Peter reads his farewell letter

Unseen studio executives providing vocal cameos include Garry Marshall, Paul Mazursky, Sydney Pollack, Carl Reiner, and Rob Reiner.

== Production ==
The original script by Michael Sloane had the working title of The Bijou, and was the title when Jim Carrey signed on in August 2000.

The town of Ferndale, California provided many of the interior and exterior locations for The Majestic. The namesake theater was built as a false-front in the Ferndale municipal parking lot, and many Main Street buildings were modified by the film company.

Train scenes were recorded on the California Western Railroad in Fort Bragg, California. The lighthouse used was Point Cabrillo Light.

The film is Frank Darabont's sole theatrical film that isn't a film adaptation of one of Stephen King's works.

== Reception ==
=== Box office ===
The Majestic earned $27 million at the box office in the United States and another $9 million outside the United States, which brings the worldwide total to $37 million. The film's failure at the box office was partly due to competition with The Lord of the Rings: The Fellowship of the Ring, Ocean's Eleven, Jimmy Neutron: Boy Genius and Harry Potter and the Sorcerer's Stone. The film was released in the United Kingdom on May 24, 2002, and failed to reach the Top 10.

=== Critical response ===
The Majestic received generally negative reviews from critics. On the review aggregator website Rotten Tomatoes, the film has a rating of 42% based on 142 reviews, with an average rating of 4.90/10. The website's critical consensus reads, "Ponderous and overlong, The Majestic drowns in forced sentimentality and resembles a mish mash of other, better films." On Metacritic, the film has a score of 27 out of 100, based on 30 critics, indicating "generally unfavorable reviews". Audiences polled by CinemaScore gave the film an average grade of "B+" on an A+ to F scale.

Kenneth Turan of Los Angeles Times commented that it was a "derivative, self satisfied fable that couldn't be more treacly and simple-minded if it tried".

One exception to this was Roger Ebert, who awarded the film three and a half stars and praised the film and its ideals: "It flies the flag in honor of our World War II heroes, and evokes nostalgia for small-town movie palaces and the people who run them... Frank Darabont has deliberately tried to make the kind of movie Capra made, about decent small-town folks standing up for traditional American values. In an age of Rambo patriotism, it is good to be reminded of Capra patriotism – to remember that America is not just about fighting and winning, but about defending our freedoms." Ebert also praised Jim Carrey's performance stating that he "has never been better or more likable".

In 2008 interview with Empire magazine, Darabont said,

The Majestic is a movie I'm very proud of and I really love. It achieved exactly what I set out to make. And I find it very moving. But in your very magazine, somebody who praised the hell out of Shawshank said, "Frank Darabont needs to apologise for making The Majestic." And I thought, "Really? What did I do? I need to apologise? Kiss my ass!"

== See also ==
- McCarthyism
- World War II
