= Michael Sloane =

American screenwriter (born 1959)

- Born: January 29, 1959 (age 67); Los Angeles, California
- Occupations: Screenwriter, actor, playwright

Michael Sloane (born January 29, 1959) is an American actor and screenwriter, known for writing the 2001 drama film The Majestic, starring Jim Carrey.

== Early life ==
Sloane was born in Los Angeles, California. He attended Hollywood High School, where he became friends with future filmmaker and collaborator Frank Darabont. He also worked as a standup comedian.

== Career ==
His acting credits include Teen Lust (1979) and Revenge of the Red Baron (1994). He debuted as a screenwriter with the Capraesque drama The Majestic (it had the working title of The Bijou). The film, directed by Darabont, depicts a Hollywood screenwriter suspected of being a communist in 1951. After suffering amnesia as the result of a road traffic collision, he is taken in by the locals of a small town, who mistake him for a local missing soldier.

Sloane wrote and directed a 2002 short film, Two Paths. Working again with Darabont, he collaborated on the television series Mob City, writing episode 3. Sloane's stage play The Ravine, produced in association with the Latino Theatre Company, was scheduled to premiere in 2020, but was pushed back due to the COVID-19 pandemic. He also wrote Tall Woman With Red Fan.
