= Oak Room (Plaza Hotel) =

Bar and restaurant in New York City

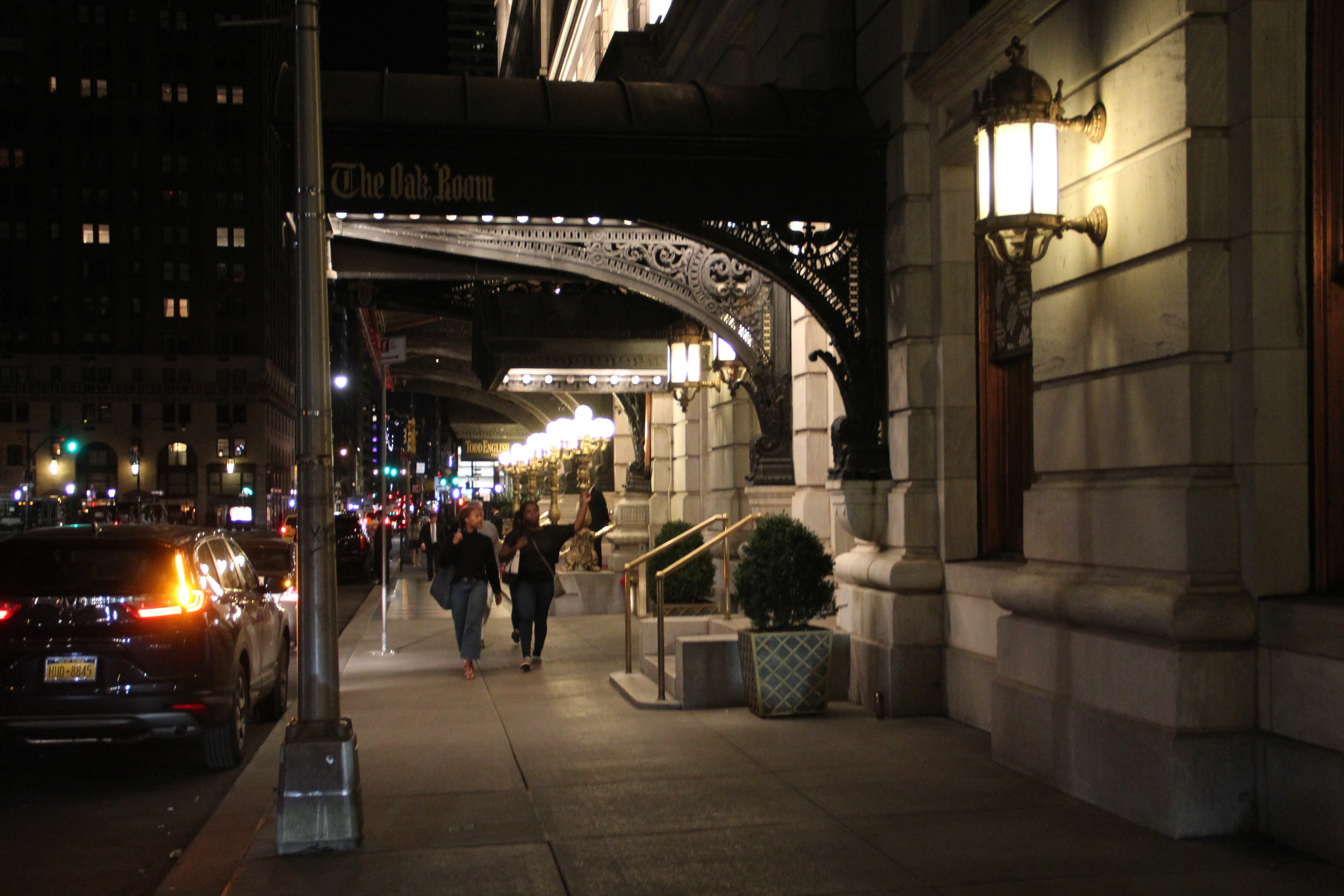
- Oak Room entrance on 59th Street
- Interactive map of Oak Room

Restaurant information
- Established: 1907
- Closed: 2011
- Location: New York City, New York, New York, United States
- Coordinates: 40°45′53″N 73°58′28″W

The Oak Room was a bar and later a restaurant in the Plaza Hotel in New York City that operated from 1907 to 2011. It was distinct from the adjoining Oak Bar. As of 2025, the hotel rents the space for private events.

== Description ==
The Oak Room was long a grand, opulent, and elegant space. Designed by Plaza Hotel architect Henry Janeway Hardenbergh in a German Renaissance style, the room had walls of English or Flemish oak, frescoes of Bavarian castles (by a painter whose identity is now lost to history), faux wine casks carved into the woodwork, and, hanging from the 20-foot ceiling, a grape-laden chandelier topped by a barmaid hoisting a stein. In 1971, critic Ada Louise Huxtable contrasted the "dignity, scale and period authenticity" of the Oak Room to other more modernized spaces in the hotel.

It was frequented, like the Plaza's other spaces, by the rich and famous. George M. Cohan was a regular; his booth was named Cohan's Corner and a commemorative plaque was installed after his death in 1942.

=== The Oak Bar ===
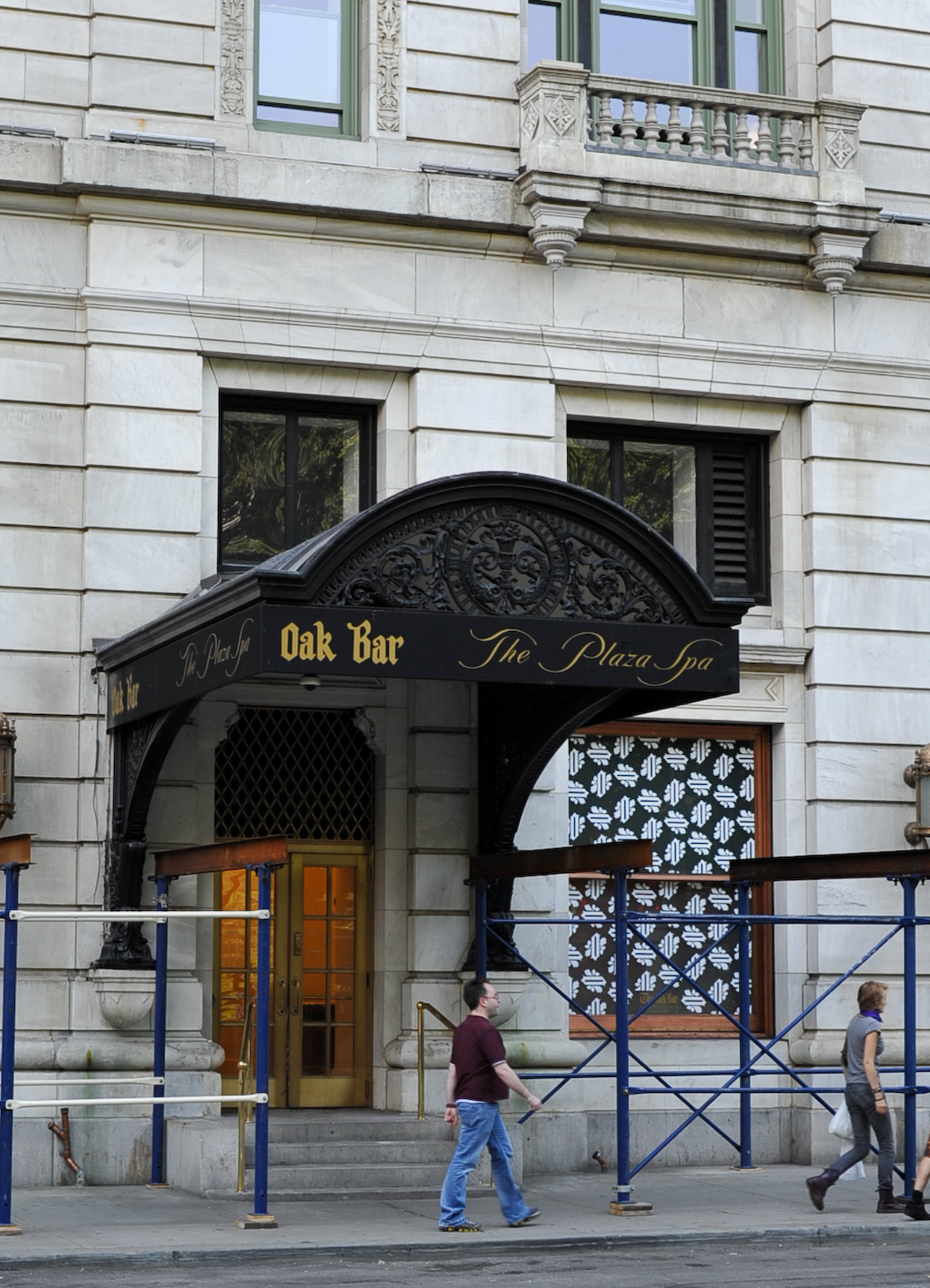
Entrance to The Oak Bar in August 2008

The Oak Bar was closely associated with the Oak Room and adjoined it but was a separate entity. The Oak Bar was established in its current location on the northwest corner of the Plaza Hotel in 1945 when the hotel was owned by Conrad Hilton. (This may have represented a re-establishment, as the area may have been part of the Men's Bar between 1912 and 1920.) At least part, and possibly all, of the area occupied by the Oak Bar had been the offices of E. F. Hutton until the 1945 renovation.

The Oak Bar is in Tudor Revival style with a plaster ceiling, strapwork, and floral and foliage motifs. During the 1945 renovation, a 38-foot (12 m) oakwood bar was installed. and three Everett Shinn murals were commissioned. The murals remain in place.

== History ==
It opened in 1907 as the Men's Bar; women would be barred for decades. Men used the Men's Bar to talk business, in contrast with the Men's Grill (now the Plaza Hotel's Edwardian Room restaurant), which acted as a social club where business discussion was socially inappropriate. The bar closed during Prohibition (1920–1933) during which time it was known as the Café or Oak Lounge.

The Men's Bar re-opened in 1934 as a restaurant under the name Oak Room. Starting in the late 1940s, women were allowed in the Oak Room during the summers. By the early 1950s, women were allowed inside the Oak Room and Bar during the evenings year-round, though still barred until 3 p.m. on weekdays, while the stock exchanges operated. In February 1969, Betty Friedan and other members of the National Organization for Women held a sit-in and then picketed to protest this; the gender restriction was removed a few months later.

The restaurant closed along with the hotel for renovation in 2005, reopening in 2008 after renovations with interior design by Annabelle Selldorf.

The restaurant closed in 2011 after a dispute between the owners of the Plaza Hotel (various investors led by the El-Ad Group) and Eli Gindi, owner of the Oak Room and lessee of the Plaza Hotel. The hotel alleged that the restaurant owners had failed to pay the rent, among other matters, but a major point of contention was the "Day and Night" parties held on Saturday afternoons. These events (crucial to the Oak Room's profitability, bringing in $180,000 in an afternoon) were rowdy and featured loud music, and were described by the hotel's owners as damaging to the hotel's reputation and disturbing to the hotel's guests.

== Notable performers ==
Although the hotel's Rose Club (formerly the Persian Room) has long been the hotel's premier nightclub and venue for entertainment, the Oak Room has also hosted performers including Alexa Ray Joel and Brian Newman. Lady Gaga appeared in impromptu performances with Newman in the Oak Room on September 29, 2010 (wearing a dress made of hair) and again on January 5, 2011.

== In popular culture ==
Several movies and television shows include scenes shot in the Oak Room, including:

- The 1981 film Arthur
- The 1992 film Scent of a Woman.
- A scene in Steven Spielberg's 2017 film The Post was shot in the Oak Bar, in which Katharine Graham, played by Meryl Streep, has dinner with A. M. Rosenthal, played by Michael Stuhlbarg, and Rosenthal's wife.
- The Oak Room was seen in the Gossip Girl episode "The Goodbye Gossip Girl", when Serena (Blake Lively) texted "Gossip Girl" to meet her at the Oak Room or she would reveal her identity but, instead, the whole class appears.
- As mentioned in Eloise at the Plaza, the Oak Room is the only place the titular protagonist is not allowed to go into.
- In the movie Remember Me (2010 film), Tyler, played by Robert Pattinson, his father, Charles, played by Pierce Brosnan and Abby, played by Emilie de Ravin are seen having dinner at the Oak Room.

Other shows mention or allude to the Oak Room, including:

- Alfred Hitchcock's 1959 film North by Northwest sets Cary Grant's opening scene in the Oak Bar, though it was shot elsewhere for space reasons.
- In the 1968 play Plaza Suite and its 1971 film adaptation, set at the hotel, a character mentions going to the Oak Room to get drunk.
- In the 2013 film The Great Gatsby, the Oak Room inspired the set used for a scene at the Plaza.
- Todd Haynes' 2015 film Carol sets the final scene, when Carol (Cate Blanchett) invites Therese (Rooney Mara) to join her for dinner, in the Oak Room. The scene was actually shot in Cincinnati.
- In a 2015 episode ("The Forecast") of Mad Men, Joan Harris (Christina Hendricks) suggests meeting Richard Burghoff for a date at the Oak Room.
