= Teen Lust (1979 film) =

1979 film by James Hong

- Directed by: James Hong
- Starring: Kirsten Baker; Perry Lang; Leslie Cederquist; Rick Singer
- Release date: 1979
- Country: United States
- Language: English

Teen Lust (also known as The Girls Next Door and Mom Never Told Me in the United States, and released as Police Girls Academy in the United Kingdom) is a 1979 American sexploitation comedy film directed by actor James Hong.

== Plot ==
Two young women move to a quiet suburban neighborhood, where they attract the romantic interest of several local men.

== Cast ==
- Kirsten Baker as Carol Hill
- Perry Lang as Terry Davis
- Leslie Cederquist as Neeley Carter
- Rick Singer as Hotrod
- Lee Ann Barnes as De De
- Robert Gribbin as Officer Drury
- Michael Heit as Officer Turner
- Dalene Young as Mother
- Stan Kamber as Father
- Michael Allyn as Ted
- Michael Sloane as Dustin
- George 'Buck' Flower as Mr. Sykes
