= Brian Newman =

American jazz musician and singer

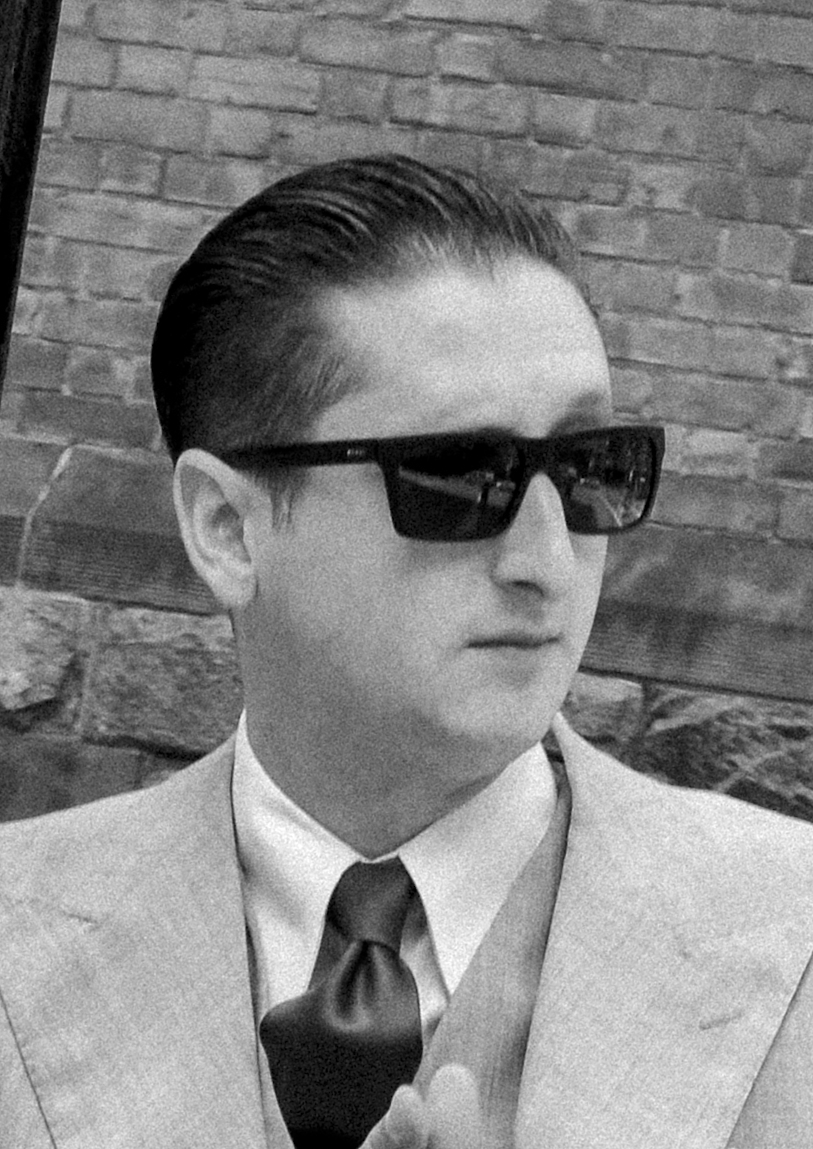
- Newman in New York City

Background information
- Born: June 10, 1981 (age 45); Ohio, United States
- Genres: Jazz rock; jazz fusion; traditional pop
- Occupations: Musician; Band director; Podcast host
- Instrument: Trumpet
- Years active: 1990–present
- Label: Sistilia Records
- Spouse: Angie Pontani (m. 2013)
- Website: briannewman.com

Brian Anthony Newman (born June 10, 1981) is an American musician, band director, producer, and podcast host. He is most known for his numerous performances with Lady Gaga and Tony Bennett. Alongside his wife Angie Pontani, Newman produces their live variety show After Dark, which they have performed at the NoMad Library at the Park MGM in Las Vegas and The Box in New York City.

Newman has released three full-length albums: Eyes on the City (2016), Showboat (2018) and Electric Lounge (2020).

Newman and Pontani co-host a podcast called Showing Off with Brian Newman & Angie Pontani.

== Early life ==
Newman was born on June 10, 1981, and raised in Mentor, Ohio, and Concord Township, Ohio, near Cleveland. He told his mother at age 12 that he wanted to grow up to be a New York City jazz musician. He began playing at age nine and made his public debut at age 14. He is a 1999 graduate of Notre Dame-Cathedral Latin High School. Concerning his youth in Cleveland, Newman stated, "That's one thing Cleveland and my family taught me well—the importance of hard work...There are a lot of hard workers in Cleveland." He attended the University of Cincinnati's College-Conservatory of Music in Cincinnati, Ohio.

== Career ==
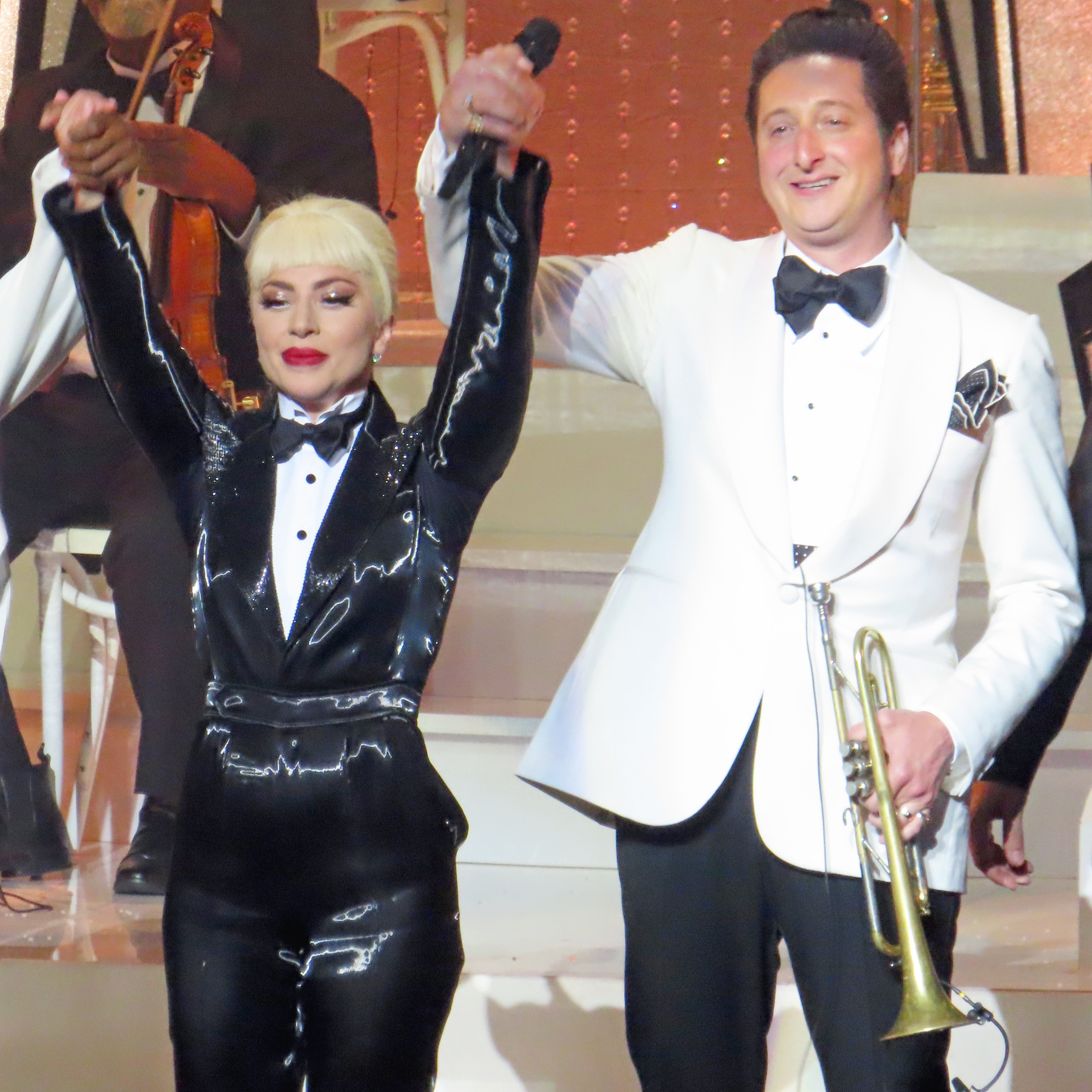
Newman with Lady Gaga during her residency in Las Vegas (pictured in 2022)

Along with other graduates from Cincinnati's College-Conservatory of Music, Newman began performing in venues across New York City including the Oak Room at the Plaza Hotel, and Duane Park. Newman has also performed trumpet for Tony Bennett and Mark Murphy. When he first arrived in New York, Newman served bar and waited tables between performances to help make ends meet. Newman's music was featured in the 2011 film, Friends with Kids. In 2018, he released the LP Showboat.

=== Collaboration with Lady Gaga ===
While in New York City, Newman befriended Lady Gaga's boyfriend, Luc Carl, which led to a friendship with Lady Gaga. He has performed with Gaga on the special, A Very Gaga Thanksgiving (and its follow-up EP, A Very Gaga Holiday), The Today Show, the MTV Video Music Awards, and BBC Radio. He arranged and appeared on Lady Gaga's jazz album with Tony Bennett, Cheek to Cheek (2014), and later their second album, Love for Sale (2021). Gaga has also made random surprise appearances at Newman's gigs throughout the city which have been covered by major media outlets including E!, MTV, and VH1. His trumpet performance can also be heard on the track "Just Another Day", from Gaga's 2016 album Joanne. He also collaborated with Gaga on "Don't Let Me Be Misunderstood" from his Showboat album. Their later collaborations include the television special One Last Time: An Evening with Tony Bennett and Lady Gaga, and Gaga's Las Vegas residency, Jazz & Piano.

== Personal life ==
In 2013, Newman married Angie Pontani, a burlesque dancer who was Miss Exotic World 2008. They have a daughter named Sistilia. Her godmother is Lady Gaga, and Sistilia's baptism is featured in the documentary Gaga: Five Foot Two.

== Discography ==
- Live from New York City (2012)
- Eyes on the City (2016)
- Showboat (2018)
- Electric Lounge (2020)
- Songs For Lonely Lovers (2026)
