= Willie Stein =

American songwriter

- Born: c. 1917
- Died: 5 September 2009
- Genres: Various
- Occupations: Television producer, songwriter.

Willie Stein was an American television producer and songwriter.

In 1950, Stein and Milton DeLugg cowrote the song "Orange Colored Sky", which became a hit for Nat King Cole, and later his daughter Natalie.

Among his television productions were To Tell the Truth, Sale of the Century, Spin-Off, The $128,000 Question and The David Letterman Show, the NBC daytime series. In 1979, he was the producer of Say Powww, TV's original interactive game show, directed by Sidney M. Cohen in Los Angeles. They later co-created Thrill of a Lifetime, one of TV's first reality shows.

Together with veteran game show writer Nat Ligerman, Stein co-created and co-produced the Canadian comedy game The Joke's on Us, which was hosted by Ligerman's longtime boss, Monty Hall.

Willie Stein died at home on September 5, 2009, at the age of 92, of complications from stomach cancer.
