= Gagadon =

Gagadon Temporal range: Ypresian

Scientific classification
- Kingdom: Animalia
- Phylum: Chordata
- Class: Mammalia
- Infraclass: Placentalia
- Order: Artiodactyla
- Family: †Homacodontidae
- Genus: †Gagadon; Stucky & Covert, 2014
- Species: †G. minimonstrum

Binomial name
- †Gagadon minimonstrum Stucky & Covert, 2014

Extinct genus of mammals

Gagadon ("Gaga tooth") is an extinct genus of even-toed ungulate that lived in the early Eocene of North America. The type and only known species, Gagadon minimonstrum, was described in 2014 based on lower teeth and jaw fragments found in the Wasatch Formation of Bitter Creek, Wyoming. The genus is named in honor of the singer Lady Gaga, while the species name minimonstrum ("mini monster") refers simultaneously to the small size and presence of unusual cusps on the teeth and to Gaga's name for her fans, the "little monsters".

== See also ==
- Gaga (plant), a genus of ferns also named after Lady Gaga
- Aleiodes gaga, a wasp also named after Lady Gaga
- List of organisms named after famous people (born 1975–present)
