= Hillary Clinton presidential campaign endorsements =

Hillary Clinton presidential campaign endorsements may refer to:

- List of Hillary Clinton 2008 presidential campaign endorsements
- List of Hillary Clinton 2016 presidential campaign endorsements (disambiguation)
  - List of Hillary Clinton 2016 presidential campaign non-political endorsements
  - List of Hillary Clinton 2016 presidential campaign political endorsements
