= List of Hillary Clinton 2016 presidential campaign endorsements =

For a list of Hillary Clinton 2016 presidential campaign endorsements, see:

- List of Hillary Clinton 2016 presidential campaign political endorsements
- List of Hillary Clinton 2016 presidential campaign non-political endorsements
  - List of Hillary Clinton 2016 presidential campaign celebrity endorsements
    - List of Hillary Clinton 2016 presidential campaign screen and stage performer endorsements
