= Aleiodes gaga =

Scientific classification
- Kingdom: Animalia
- Phylum: Arthropoda
- Clade: Pancrustacea
- Class: Insecta
- Order: Hymenoptera
- Family: Braconidae
- Genus: Aleiodes
- Species: A. gaga

Binomial name
- Aleiodes gaga Quicke & Butcher, 2012

Species of wasp

Aleiodes gaga is a species of parasitoid wasp belonging to the family Braconidae. It was first described by Donald Quicke and Buntika Butcher in 2012 after a single individual was discovered in the Chae Son National Park in Thailand. The species is named after Lady Gaga. This species is one of 179 species identified by the first "turbo-taxonomic" search of DNA barcoding of cytochrome oxidase I (COI).

== See also ==
- Gaga, a genus of ferns also named after Lady Gaga
- Gagadon, a fossil genus of prehistoric mammals also named after Lady Gaga
- List of organisms named after famous people (born 1975–present)
