= Lady Gaga =

American singer, songwriter and actress (born 1986)

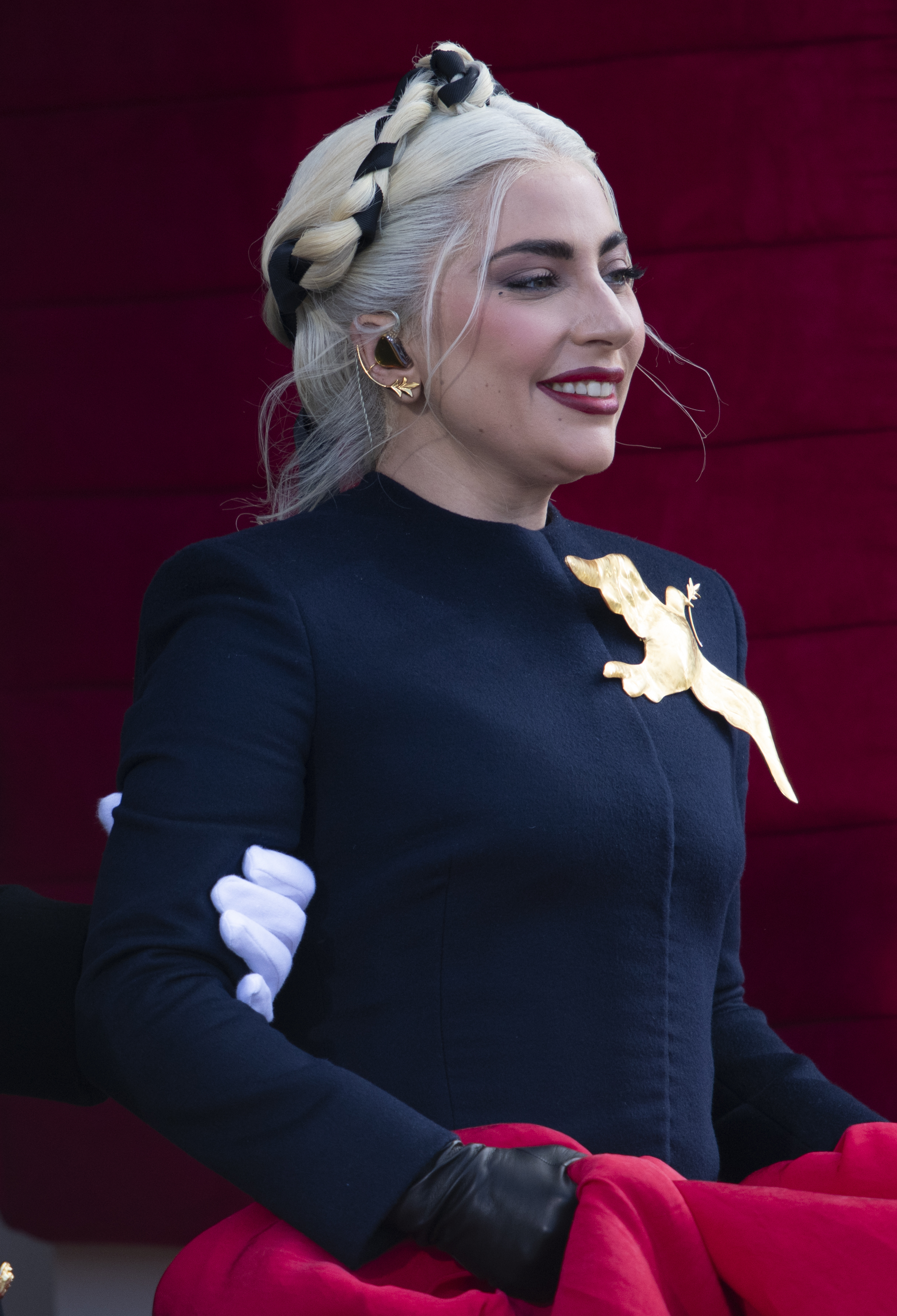
- Gaga at the inauguration of Joe Biden in 2021
- Born: Stefani Joanne Angelina Germanotta; March 28, 1986 (age 40); New York City, US
- Occupations: Singer; songwriter; actress
- Years active: 2000–present
- Organizations: Born This Way Foundation; Haus Labs
- Works: Discography; songs; videography; performances
- Partner: Michael Polansky (eng. 2024)
- Children: 1
- Mother: Cynthia Germanotta
- Awards: Full list
- Musical career
- Genres: Pop; dance; electronic; jazz
- Instruments: Vocals; piano; keyboards
- Labels: Def Jam; Cherrytree; KonLive; Streamline; Interscope
- Gaga's voice Gaga singing "The Star-Spangled Banner" at Joe Biden's inauguration Recorded January 20, 2021
- Website: ladygaga.com

Stefani Joanne Angelina Germanotta (Note: Pronunciation: /ˈstɛfəni ˌdʒɜːrməˈnɒtə/ STEF-ən-ee JUR-mə-NOT-ə) (born March 28, 1986), known professionally as Lady Gaga, is an American singer, songwriter, and actress. An influential figure in popular music, she is known for her image reinventions, flamboyant fashion, and versatility across the entertainment industry. With estimated sales of 124 million records, she is one of the best-selling music artists of all time.

After signing with Interscope Records in 2007, Gaga achieved global recognition with her debut album, The Fame (2008), and its reissue, The Fame Monster (2009). The project's singles "Just Dance", "Poker Face", and "Bad Romance" each received Diamond certifications from the Recording Industry Association of America (RIAA). Her second studio album, Born This Way (2011), explored electronic rock and techno-pop and sold 1.1 million copies in the US in its first week. Its title track became the fastest-selling song on the iTunes Store, with over one million downloads in less than a week. Following her electronic dance music-influenced third album, Artpop (2013), she pursued jazz on the album Cheek to Cheek (2014) with Tony Bennett, and delved into soft rock on the album Joanne (2016).

Gaga also ventured into acting, gaining praise for her leading roles in the miniseries American Horror Story: Hotel (2015–2016) and the films A Star Is Born (2018) and House of Gucci (2021). Her contributions to the A Star Is Born soundtrack, which spawned the chart-topping single "Shallow", made her the first person to win an Academy, BAFTA, Golden Globe, and Grammy Award in one year. Gaga returned to her early sound with the pop-oriented albums Chromatica (2020) and Mayhem (2025), which respectively included the number-one singles "Rain on Me" and "Die with a Smile". She also continued to explore jazz with Love for Sale (2021), her second and final album with Bennett, and the soundtrack Harlequin (2024).

Gaga has seven number-one albums on the Billboard 200 and six number-one songs on the Billboard Hot 100. She is the first female artist with four singles that each sold at least 10 million copies globally and holds the record for the most-attended concert by a woman. The highest-paid female musician of 2011, she has received 16 Grammy Awards, 22 MTV Video Music Awards, 2 Golden Globe Awards, a Sports Emmy Award, and a recognition from the Songwriters Hall of Fame. Gaga's philanthropy and activism focus on mental health awareness and LGBTQ rights. Her business ventures include vegan cosmetics brand Haus Labs and the non-profit Born This Way Foundation, which supports the wellness of young people.

== Life and career ==
=== 1986–2004: Early life ===
Stefani Joanne Angelina Germanotta was born on March 28, 1986, at Lenox Hill Hospital in the Lenox Hill neighborhood of Manhattan in New York City. Her parents are Cynthia Louise (née Bissett), a philanthropist and business executive, and Joseph Germanotta, an Internet entrepreneur; both have Italian ancestry. According to Gaga, her parents came from lower-class families and worked hard for everything. They raised Gaga and her younger sister, Natali, in an upper-middle-class Catholic family on the Upper West Side. From age 11, Gaga attended the Convent of the Sacred Heart, a private all-girls Catholic school on the Upper East Side. She has described her high-school self as "very dedicated, very studious, very disciplined" and somewhat insecure. She considered herself a misfit and was mocked for being provocative and eccentric.

At age four, Gaga began playing the piano when her mother insisted that she become "a cultured young woman". She took piano lessons and practiced throughout her childhood. The lessons taught her to learn music by ear, which she preferred over reading sheet music. Her parents encouraged her to pursue music and enrolled her in Creative Arts Camp. As a teenager, she played at open mic nights. She played the lead roles of Adelaide in the play Guys and Dolls and Philia in the play A Funny Thing Happened on the Way to the Forum at Regis High School. She also studied method acting at the Lee Strasberg Theatre and Film Institute for 10 years. Her screen debut was a background appearance in the 2000 music video for the AC/DC song "Stiff Upper Lip". Gaga unsuccessfully auditioned for New York theater productions; she appeared in a background role as a high-school student in a 2001 episode of The Sopranos titled "The Telltale Moozadell". Fan interest in that episode increased when a clip of Gaga's scene surfaced online in 2010.

In 2003, Gaga gained early admission to Collaborative Arts Project 21, a music school at New York University's Tisch School of the Arts. There, she improved her songwriting skills by writing essays on art, religion, social issues, and politics, including a thesis on the pop artists Spencer Tunick and Damien Hirst. In 2005, Gaga withdrew from school during the second semester of her second year to focus on her music career. That year, she also played a restaurant customer on MTV's Boiling Points, a prank reality television show.

In a 2014 interview, Gaga discussed being raped at age 19 by her producer, and undergoing emotional and physical therapy for the trauma. She later revealed that following the assault, her rapist dropped her off pregnant near her parents' house because she was sick and vomiting. Gaga has post-traumatic stress disorder which she attributes to the rape; she said the trauma has changed her as a person and will never leave her.

=== 2005–2007: Career beginnings ===
In 2005, Gaga recorded two songs with rapper Melle Mel for an audiobook accompanying the Cricket Casey children's novel The Portal in the Park. She also formed a band called the SGBand with some friends from NYU. They played gigs around New York and became a fixture of the downtown Lower East Side club scene. After the 2006 Songwriters Hall of Fame New Songwriters Showcase at the Cutting Room in June, talent scout Wendy Starland recommended Gaga to music producer Rob Fusari. He collaborated with Gaga, helping her develop songs and compose new material. He said they began dating in May 2006, and claimed he was the first person to call her "Lady Gaga", which was derived from the Queen song "Radio Ga Ga". According to Fusari, the name was coined when he attempted to call her "Radio Ga Ga" in a text message, and his phone's spell checker autocorrected "Radio" to "Lady". Their relationship lasted until January 2007.

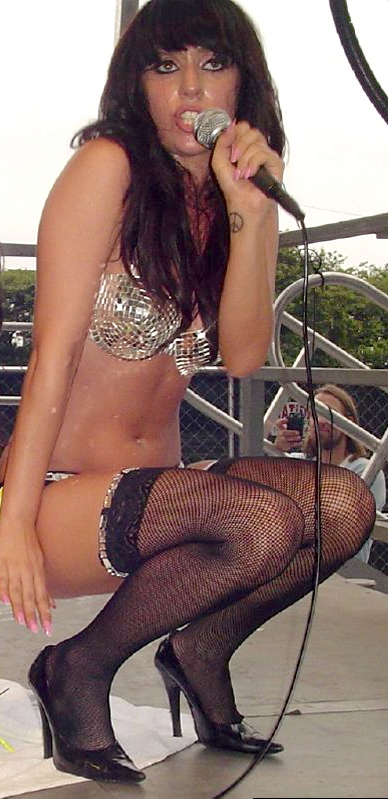
Gaga performing at Lollapalooza in 2007

Fusari and Gaga established a company called Team Lovechild, LLC to promote her career. They recorded and produced electropop tracks, sending them to music industry executives. Joshua Sarubin, the head of Artists and Repertoire at Def Jam Recordings, responded positively and, after approval from his boss Antonio "L.A." Reid, Gaga was signed to Def Jam in September 2006. She was dropped from the label three months later, a decision which Reid later said was the biggest mistake of his life. Following this, Gaga began performing at neo-burlesque shows, and said these represented freedom to her. During this time, she met the performance artist Lady Starlight, who helped mold her onstage persona. The pair began performing at downtown club venues like the Mercury Lounge, the Bitter End, and the Rockwood Music Hall. Their live performance art piece, known as "Lady Gaga and the Starlight Revue" and billed as "The Ultimate Pop Burlesque Rockshow", was a tribute to 1970s variety acts. They also performed at the 2007 Lollapalooza music festival.

Having initially focused on avant-garde electronic dance music, Gaga began to incorporate pop melodies and the glam rock style of David Bowie and Queen into her songs. While Gaga and Starlight were performing, Fusari continued to develop the songs he had created with her, sending them to the producer and record executive Vincent Herbert. In November 2007, Herbert signed Gaga to his label Streamline Records, an imprint of Interscope Records, which had been established that month. Gaga later credited Herbert as the man who discovered her. Having served as an apprentice songwriter during an internship at Famous Music, Gaga struck a music publishing deal with Sony/ATV Music Publishing. As a result, she was hired to write songs for Britney Spears, New Kids on the Block, Fergie, and the Pussycat Dolls.

At Interscope, the singer Akon was impressed with Gaga's singing ability when she sang a reference vocal for one of his tracks in studio. Akon convinced Jimmy Iovine, chairman and CEO of Interscope Geffen A&M Records (a sister company of Def Jam), to form a joint deal by having Gaga also sign with his own label KonLive Distribution, and described her as his "franchise player". According to Gaga, some radio stations found her early music too "racy", "dance-oriented", and "underground" for the mainstream market, to which she responded: "My name is Lady Gaga, I've been on the music scene for years, and I'm telling you, this is what's next."

=== 2008–2010: Breakthrough with The Fame and The Fame Monster ===
By 2008, Gaga had relocated to Los Angeles to complete her debut album, The Fame, and to set up her own creative team called the Haus of Gaga, modeled on Andy Warhol's The Factory. Gaga collaborated with the songwriter-producers RedOne and Martin Kierszenbaum on The Fame, which was released on August 19, 2008 by Cherrytree Records, an Interscope imprint established by Kierszenbaum. (Note: Attributed to multiple references:) The album reached number one in Austria, Canada, Germany, Ireland, Switzerland and the UK, as well as the top five in Australia and the US. Its first two singles, "Just Dance" and "Poker Face", reached number one in Australia, Canada, the UK and the US. "Poker Face" was also the world's best-selling single of 2009, with 9.8 million copies sold, and spent a record 83 weeks on Billboard magazine's Digital Songs chart. Three other singles, "Eh, Eh (Nothing Else I Can Say)", "LoveGame" and "Paparazzi", were released from the album, with "Paparazzi" reaching number one in Germany. Remixed versions of the singles from The Fame, except "Eh, Eh (Nothing Else I Can Say)", were included on Gaga's extended play (EP) Hitmixes in August 2009. At the 52nd Annual Grammy Awards, The Fame and "Poker Face" won Best Dance/Electronic Album and Best Dance Recording, respectively. Gaga was the most awarded artist at the 2010 Brit Awards, winning in three categories.

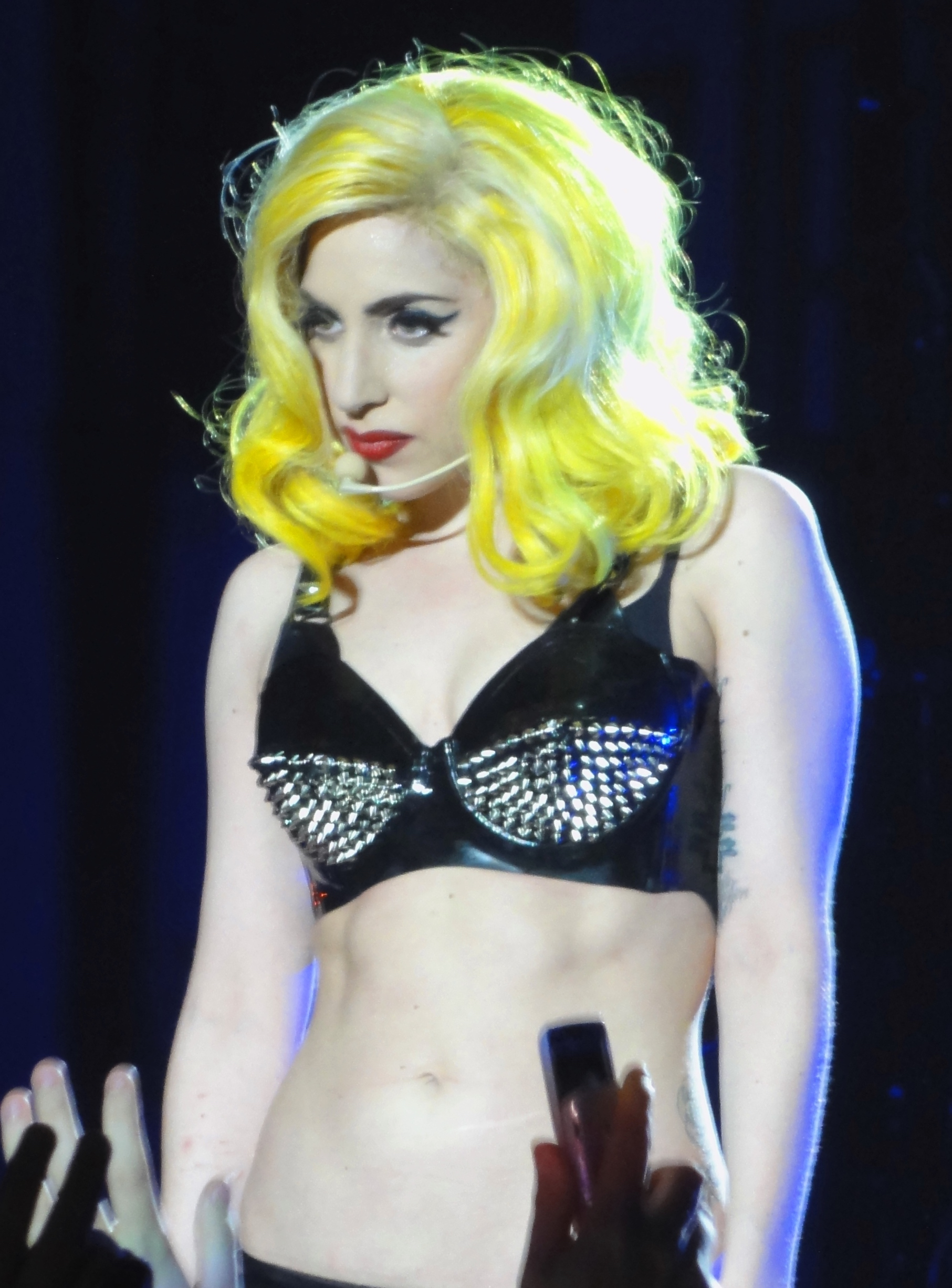
Gaga in 2010 on The Monster Ball Tour, which grossed $227 million to become the highest-grossing concert tour for a debut headlining artist

Following her opening act on the Pussycat Dolls' 2009 Doll Domination Tour in Europe and Oceania, Gaga headlined her worldwide The Fame Ball Tour, which ran from March to September 2009. While traveling the globe, she wrote eight songs for The Fame Monster, a reissue of The Fame. The new songs were also released as a standalone EP on November 18, 2009. The first single, "Bad Romance", was released one month earlier and was number one in Canada and the UK, and number two in Australia, New Zealand and the US. "Telephone", with Beyoncé, followed as the second single from the EP and became Gaga's fourth UK number one. The record's third single was "Alejandro", which reached number one in Finland; its music video was deemed blasphemous by the Catholic League. Both "Telephone" and "Alejandro" reached the top five in the US. The video for "Bad Romance" became the most watched video on YouTube in April 2010. That October, Gaga became the first person with more than one billion total YouTube views.

At the 2010 MTV Video Music Awards, Gaga won eight awards from 13 nominations, including Video of the Year for "Bad Romance". She was the most nominated artist for a single year, and the first woman to receive two nominations for Video of the Year at the same ceremony. The Fame Monster won the Grammy Award for Best Pop Vocal Album, and "Bad Romance" won Best Female Pop Vocal Performance and Best Short Form Music Video at the 53rd Annual Grammy Awards. Rolling Stone featured "Bad Romance" and its music video on their respective lists of the "500 Greatest Songs of All Time" and "100 Greatest Music Videos of All Time" in 2021.

In 2009, Gaga spent a record 150 weeks on the UK Singles Chart and became the most downloaded female act in a year in the US, with 11.1 million downloads, earning an entry in the Guinness Book of World Records. Worldwide, The Fame and The Fame Monster together have sold more than 15 million copies, and the latter was 2010's second best-selling album. (Note: Attributed to multiple references:) Its success allowed Gaga to start her second worldwide concert tour, The Monster Ball Tour, and release The Remix, her final record with Cherrytree Records and among the best-selling remix albums of all time. The Monster Ball Tour ran from November 2009 to May 2011 and grossed $227.4 million, making it the highest-grossing concert tour for a debut headlining artist. Concerts performed at Madison Square Garden in New York City were filmed for an HBO television special, Lady Gaga Presents the Monster Ball Tour: At Madison Square Garden.

During this era, Gaga ventured into business, collaborating with consumer electronics company Monster Cable Products to create in-ear, jewel-encrusted headphones called Heartbeats by Lady Gaga. She also partnered with Polaroid in January 2010 as their creative director and announced a suite of photo-capture products called Grey Label. Her collaboration with her past record producer and ex-boyfriend Rob Fusari led to a lawsuit against her production team, Mermaid Music LLC. (Note: In 2010, Fusari claimed he was entitled to a 20% share of the company's earnings, but the New York Supreme Court dismissed both the lawsuit and a counter-suit by Gaga.) At this time, Gaga was tested borderline positive for lupus but claimed not to be affected by the symptoms and hoped to maintain a healthy lifestyle.

=== 2011–2014: Born This Way, Artpop, and Cheek to Cheek ===
In February 2011, Gaga released "Born This Way", the lead single from her studio album of the same name. The song sold more than one million copies within five days, earning the Guinness World Record for the fastest selling single on iTunes. It debuted atop the Billboard Hot 100, becoming the 1,000th number-one single in the history of the charts. Its second single "Judas" followed two months later, and "The Edge of Glory" served as its third single. Both reached the top 10 in the US and the UK. Her music video for "The Edge of Glory", unlike her previous work, portrays her dancing on a fire escape and walking on a lonely street, without intricate choreography and back-up dancers.

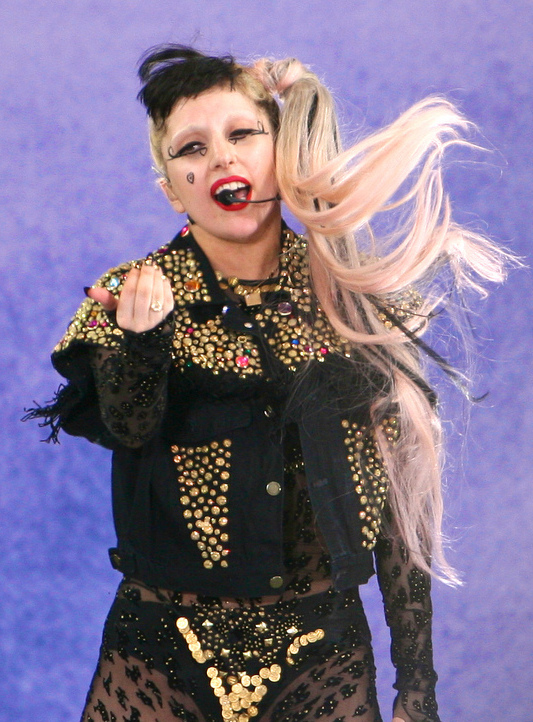
Gaga promoting Born This Way with a performance on Good Morning America in 2011

Born This Way was released on May 23, 2011, and debuted atop the Billboard 200 with first-week sales of 1.1 million copies. It sold eight million copies worldwide and received three Grammy nominations, including Gaga's third consecutive nomination for Album of the Year. Rolling Stone listed the record among "The 500 Greatest Albums of All Time" in 2020. Born This Way's following singles were "You and I" and "Marry the Night", which reached numbers 6 and 29 in the US, respectively. Its track, "Bloody Mary", became a resurgent success and was released as a single in 2022. While filming the "You and I" music video, Gaga met and started dating actor Taylor Kinney in July 2011, who played her love interest. She also embarked on the Born This Way Ball tour in April 2012, which was scheduled to conclude the following March, but ended one month earlier when Gaga canceled the remaining dates due to a labral tear of her right hip that required surgery. While refunds for the cancellations were estimated to be worth $25 million, the tour grossed $183.9 million globally.

In 2011, Gaga also worked with Tony Bennett on a jazz version of "The Lady Is a Tramp", with Elton John on "Hello Hello" for the animated feature film Gnomeo & Juliet, and with The Lonely Island and Justin Timberlake on "3-Way (The Golden Rule)". On October 15, 2011, she performed an exclusive, one-off concert in Los Angeles for the "A Decade of Difference" event, celebrating the 65th birthday of former US President Bill Clinton. In November 2011, she was featured in a Thanksgiving television special titled A Very Gaga Thanksgiving, which attracted 5.7 million American viewers and spawned the release of her fourth EP, A Very Gaga Holiday. In 2012, Gaga guest-starred as an animated version of herself in an episode of The Simpsons called "Lisa Goes Gaga", and released her first fragrance, Lady Gaga Fame, followed by a second one, Eau de Gaga, in 2014. (Note: Both of the fragrances were released in association with Coty.)

Gaga began work on her third studio album, Artpop, in early 2012, during the Born This Way Ball tour. She crafted the album to mirror "a night at the club". In August 2013, Gaga released the album's lead single "Applause", which reached number one in Hungary, number four in the US, and number five in the UK. A lyric video for Artpop track "Aura" followed in October to accompany Robert Rodriguez's Machete Kills, where Gaga plays an assassin named La Chameleon. The film received generally mixed reviews and earned less than half of its $33 million budget. The second Artpop single, "Do What U Want", featured singer R. Kelly and was released later that month, topping the charts in Hungary and reaching number 13 in the US. Artpop was released on November 6, 2013, to mixed reviews. Helen Brown of The Daily Telegraph criticized Gaga for making another album about her fame and doubted the record's originality, but found it "great for dancing". The album debuted atop the Billboard 200 chart, and sold more than 2.5 million copies worldwide as of July 2014. "G.U.Y." was released as the third single in March 2014 and peaked at number 76 on the US Billboard Hot 100.

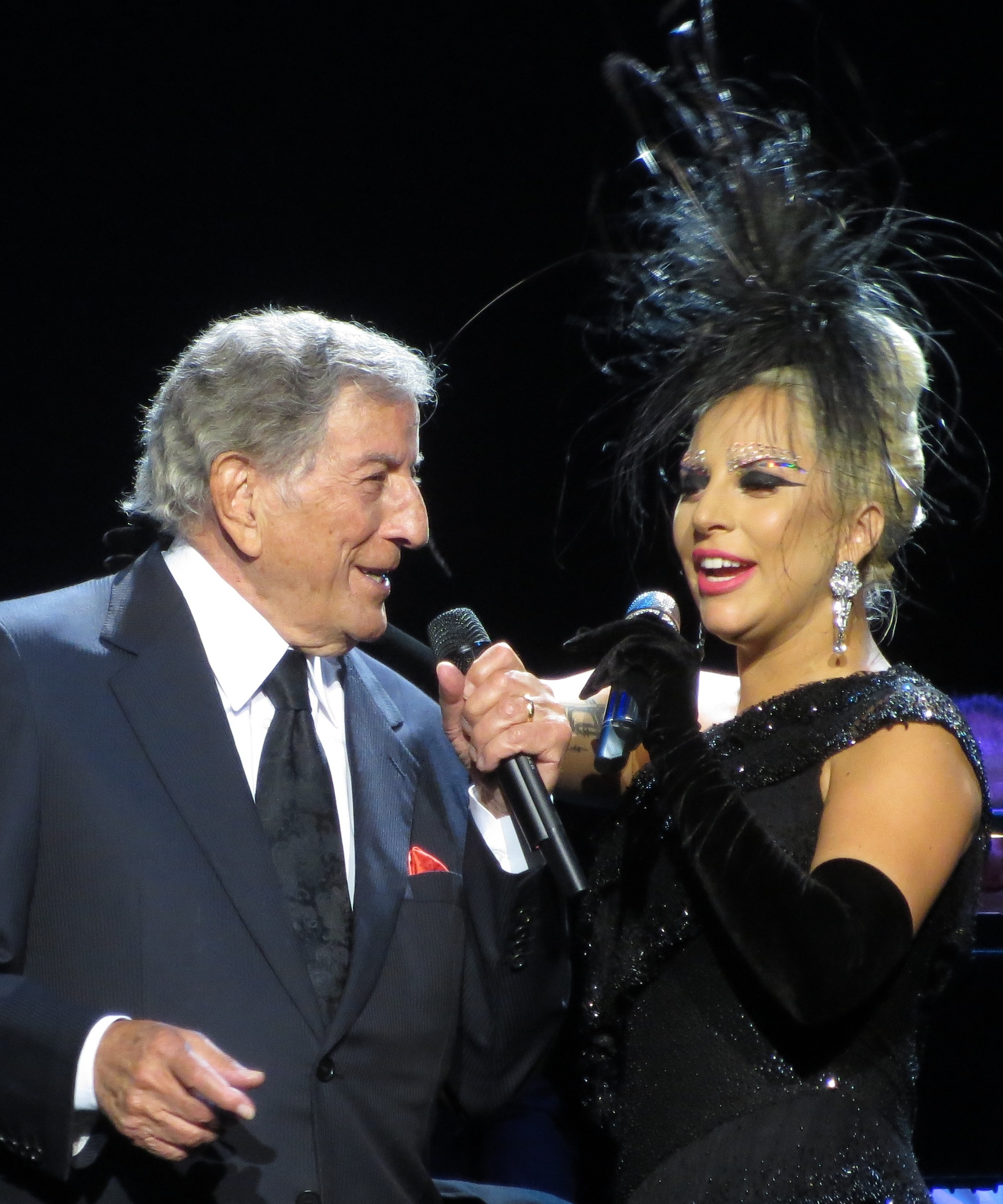
With the Cheek to Cheek era, Gaga (seen here performing on the Cheek to Cheek Tour alongside Tony Bennett) ushered in an overhaul of her image

Gaga hosted an episode of Saturday Night Live in November 2013. After holding her second Thanksgiving Day television special on ABC, Lady Gaga and the Muppets Holiday Spectacular, she performed a special rendition of "Do What U Want" with Christina Aguilera on the fifth season of the American reality talent show The Voice. In March 2014, Gaga had a seven-day concert residency commemorating the last performance at New York's Roseland Ballroom before its closure. Two months later, she embarked on the ArtRave: The Artpop Ball tour, building on concepts from her ArtRave promotional event. Earning $83 million, the tour included cities canceled from the Born This Way Ball tour itinerary. In the meantime, Gaga split from longtime manager Troy Carter over "creative differences", and by June 2014, she and new manager Bobby Campbell joined Artist Nation, the artist management division of Live Nation Entertainment. She briefly appeared in Rodriguez's Sin City: A Dame to Kill For, and was confirmed as Versace's spring-summer 2014 ambassador with a campaign called "Lady Gaga for Versace".

In September 2014, Gaga released a collaborative jazz album with Tony Bennett titled Cheek to Cheek. The inspiration behind the album came from her friendship with Bennett, and fascination with jazz music since her childhood. He stated that Gaga is "the most talented artist I have ever met". Before the album was released, it produced the singles "Anything Goes" and "I Can't Give You Anything but Love". Cheek to Cheek received generally favorable reviews; The Guardian's Caroline Sullivan praised Gaga's vocals and Howard Reich of the Chicago Tribune wrote that "Cheek to Cheek serves up the real thing, start to finish". The record was Gaga's third consecutive number-one album on the Billboard 200, and won a Grammy Award for Best Traditional Pop Vocal Album. The duo recorded the concert special Tony Bennett and Lady Gaga: Cheek to Cheek Live!, and embarked on the Cheek to Cheek Tour from December 2014 to August 2015.

=== 2015–2017: American Horror Story, Joanne, and Super Bowl performances ===
In February 2015, Gaga became engaged to Taylor Kinney. After the lukewarm response to Artpop, Gaga began to reinvent her image and style. According to Billboard, this shift started with the release of Cheek to Cheek and the attention she received for her performance at the 87th Academy Awards, where she sang a medley of songs from The Sound of Music in a tribute to Julie Andrews. Considered one of her best performances by Billboard, it triggered more than 214,000 interactions per minute globally on Facebook. She and Diane Warren co-wrote the song "Til It Happens to You" for the documentary The Hunting Ground, which earned them a nomination for the Academy Award for Best Original Song. Billboard named Gaga their 2015 Woman of the Year.

Gaga had spent much of her early life wanting to be an actress, and achieved her goal when starring in American Horror Story: Hotel. Running from October 2015 to January 2016, Hotel is the fifth season of the television anthology horror series, American Horror Story, in which she played a hotel owner named Elizabeth. At the 73rd Golden Globe Awards, Gaga received the Best Actress in a Miniseries or Television Film award for her work on the season. She appeared in Nick Knight's 2015 fashion film for Tom Ford's 2016 spring campaign and was guest editor for V fashion magazine's 99th issue in January 2016, which featured 16 different covers. She received Editor of the Year award at the Fashion Los Angeles Awards.

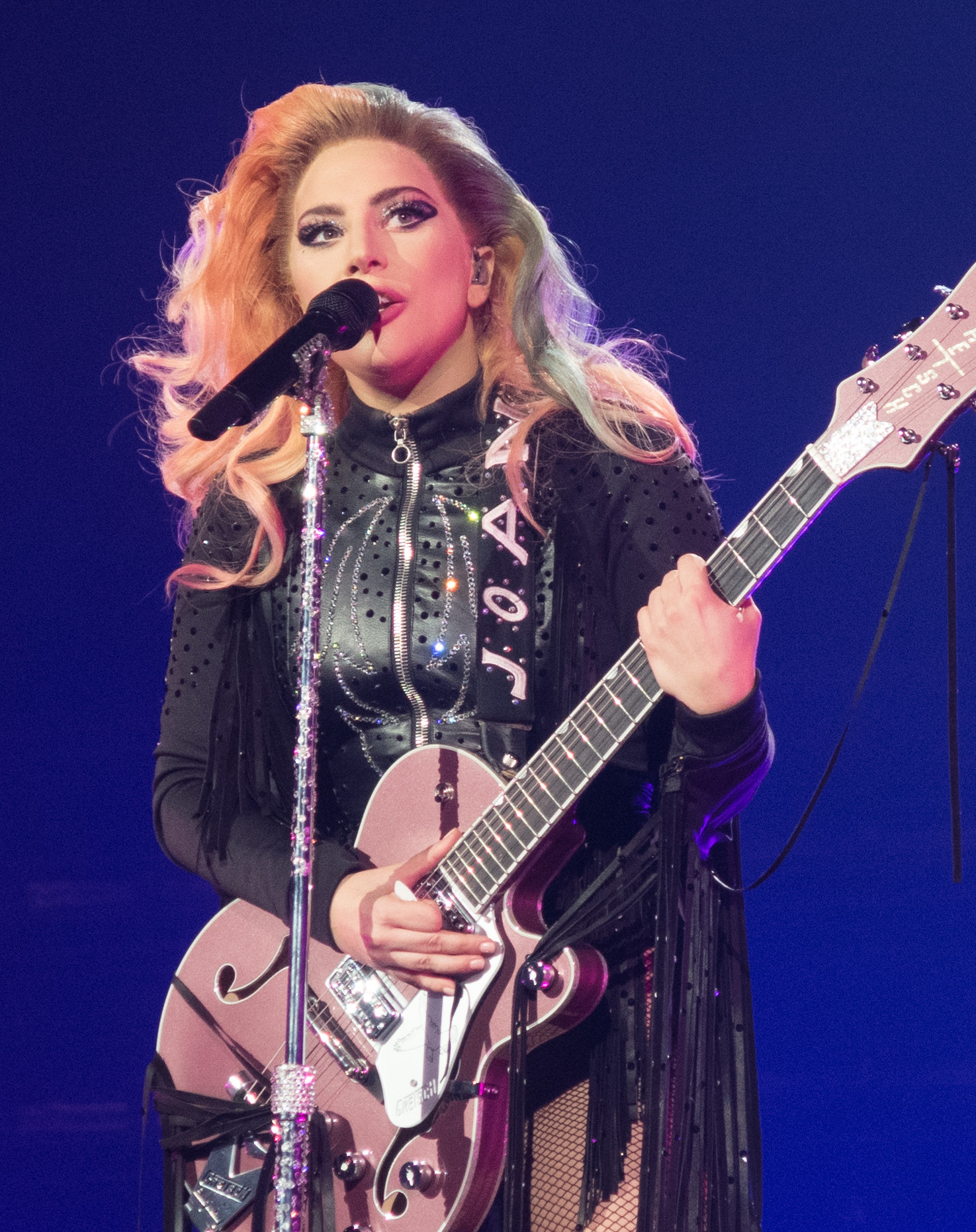
Gaga performing on the Joanne World Tour in 2017

In February 2016, Gaga sang the US national anthem at Super Bowl 50, partnered with Intel and Nile Rodgers for a tribute performance to the late David Bowie at the 58th Annual Grammy Awards, and sang "Til It Happens to You" at the 88th Academy Awards, where she was introduced by Joe Biden and was accompanied on-stage by 50 people who had suffered from sexual assault. Her engagement to Taylor Kinney ended in July; she later said her career had interfered with their relationship.

Gaga played a witch named Scathach in American Horror Story: Roanoke, the series' sixth season, which ran from September to November 2016. Her role in the fifth season of the show ultimately influenced her future music, prompting her to feature "the art of darkness". In September 2016, she released her fifth album's lead single, "Perfect Illusion", which topped the charts in France and reached number 15 in the US. The album, titled Joanne, was named after Gaga's late aunt, who was an inspiration for the music. It was released on October 21, 2016, and became Gaga's fourth number one album on the Billboard 200, making her the first woman to reach the US chart's summit four times in the 2010s. The album's second single, "Million Reasons", followed the next month and reached number four in the US. She later released a piano version of the album's title track in 2018, which won a Grammy Award for Best Pop Solo Performance. To promote the album, Gaga embarked on the three-date Dive Bar Tour.

Gaga performed as the headlining act during the Super Bowl LI halftime show on February 5, 2017. Her performance featured a group of hundreds of lighted drones forming various shapes in the sky above Houston's NRG Stadium—the first time robotic aircraft appeared in a Super Bowl program. It attracted 117.5 million viewers in the US, exceeding the game's 111.3 million viewers and making it the third most-watched Super Bowl halftime show at the time. The performance led to a surge of 410,000 song downloads in the US for Gaga and earned her an Emmy nomination in the Outstanding Special Class Program category. CBS Sports included her performance as the second best in the history of Super Bowl halftime shows. In April, Gaga headlined the Coachella Valley Music and Arts Festival. She also released a standalone single, "The Cure", which reached the top 10 in Australia. Four months later, Gaga began the Joanne World Tour, which she announced after the Super Bowl LI halftime show. Gaga's creation of Joanne and preparation for her halftime show performance were featured in the documentary Gaga: Five Foot Two, which premiered on Netflix that September. Throughout the film, she was seen suffering from chronic pain, which was later revealed to be the effect of a long-term condition called fibromyalgia. In February 2018, it prompted Gaga to cancel the last ten shows of the Joanne World Tour, which ultimately grossed $95 million from 842,000 tickets sold.

=== 2018–2019: A Star Is Born and Las Vegas residency ===
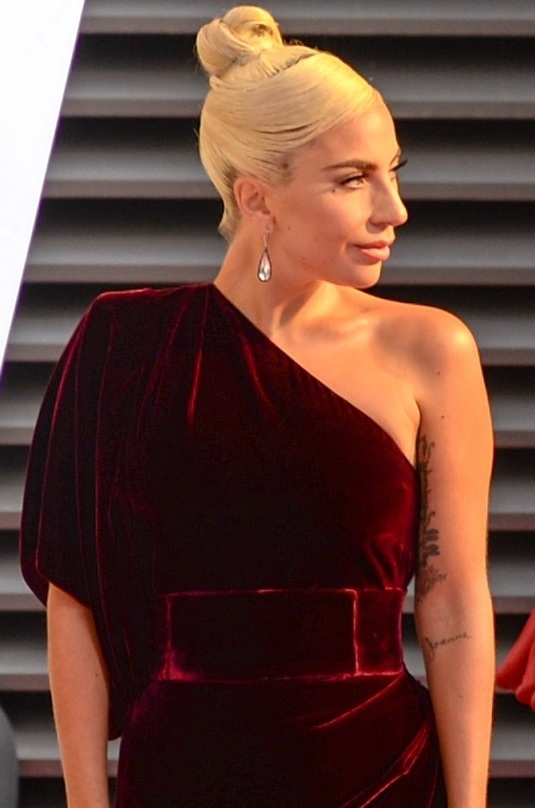
Gaga at the 2018 Toronto International Film Festival prior to the screening of A Star Is Born, which was her first lead role in a film

In March 2018, Gaga released a cover of Elton John's "Your Song" for his tribute album Revamp. Later that year, she starred as the struggling singer Ally in Bradley Cooper's musical romantic drama A Star Is Born, a remake of the 1937 film of the same name. The film follows Ally's relationship with singer Jackson Maine (played by Cooper), which becomes strained after her career begins to overshadow his. Cooper had approached Gaga after seeing her perform at a cancer research fundraiser. An admirer of Cooper's work, Gaga agreed to the project due to its portrayal of addiction and depression. A Star Is Born premiered at the 2018 Venice Film Festival, and was released worldwide that October. On the review aggregator website Rotten Tomatoes, the critical consensus describes Gaga as "appealing" in her role. Peter Bradshaw of The Guardian wrote that her ability to be "part ordinary person, part extraterrestrial celebrity empress functions at the highest level". Stephanie Zacharek of Time felt she gave a "knockout performance" and found her to be "charismatic" without her usual makeup, wigs and costumes. For the role, Gaga won the National Board of Review and Critics' Choice awards for Best Actress, in addition to receiving nominations for the Academy Award, Golden Globe Award, Screen Actors Guild Award and BAFTA Award for Best Actress.

Gaga and Cooper co-wrote and produced most of the songs on the soundtrack for A Star Is Born, which she insisted they perform live in the film. Its lead single, "Shallow", performed by the two, was released on September 27, 2018. It topped the charts in Australia, Austria, Ireland, New Zealand, Switzerland, the UK, and the US. The soundtrack contains 34 tracks, including 17 original songs, and received generally positive reviews. Mark Kennedy of The Washington Post called it a "five-star marvel", while Ben Beaumont-Thomas of The Guardian thought it contained "instant classics" showcasing Gaga's "emotional might". Commercially, the soundtrack debuted at number one in the US, extending Gaga's record for the most Billboard 200 number ones in the 2010s among women. It also topped the charts in Australia, Canada, Ireland, New Zealand, Switzerland and the UK. As of June 2019, the soundtrack had sold over six million copies worldwide. The album earned Gaga a BAFTA Award for Best Film Music and four Grammy Awards: Best Compilation Soundtrack for Visual Media (2019), Best Pop Duo/Group Performance for "Shallow" (2019) and two awards for Best Song Written for Visual Media, for "Shallow" (2019) and "I'll Never Love Again" (2020). (Note: Attributed to multiple references:) "Shallow" also won her the Academy Award, Golden Globe Award, and Critics' Choice Award for Best Original Song. Gaga gave live performances of the song at the 61st Annual Grammy Awards and the 91st Academy Awards.

In August 2018, Gaga signed a concert residency, titled Lady Gaga Enigma + Jazz & Piano, to perform at the MGM Park Theater in Las Vegas. The residency consisted of two types of shows: Enigma, which focused on theatricality and included Gaga's biggest hits, and Jazz & Piano, which involved tracks from the Great American Songbook and stripped-down versions of Gaga's songs. The Enigma show opened in December 2018 and the Jazz & Piano show opened in January 2019. In October 2018, Gaga announced her engagement to the talent agent Christian Carino, whom she had met the previous year; they called off the engagement in February 2019. In September 2019, Gaga launched a vegan makeup line, Haus Laboratories, exclusively on Amazon. Haus Laboratories lipstick reached number one on Amazon's list of best-selling lipsticks.

=== 2020–2023: Chromatica, Love for Sale, and House of Gucci ===
Gaga's sixth studio album, Chromatica, was released on May 29, 2020, to positive reviews. It debuted at the top of the US charts, becoming her sixth consecutive number-one album in the country, and reached the top spot in more than a dozen other territories including Australia, Canada, France, Italy and the UK. Chromatica's lead single, "Stupid Love", was released on February 28, 2020, and charted at number five in the US and the UK. The second single, "Rain on Me", featuring Ariana Grande, followed on May 22. It won the Best Pop Duo/Group Performance at the 63rd Annual Grammy Awards, and debuted at number one in the US, making Gaga the third person to top the country's chart in the 2000s, 2010s and 2020s. At the 2020 MTV Video Music Awards, Gaga won five awards, including the inaugural Tricon Award representing achievement in three or more fields of entertainment. In September 2020, Gaga appeared in the video campaign for Valentino's Voce Viva fragrance, singing a stripped-down version of the Chromatica track "Sine from Above".

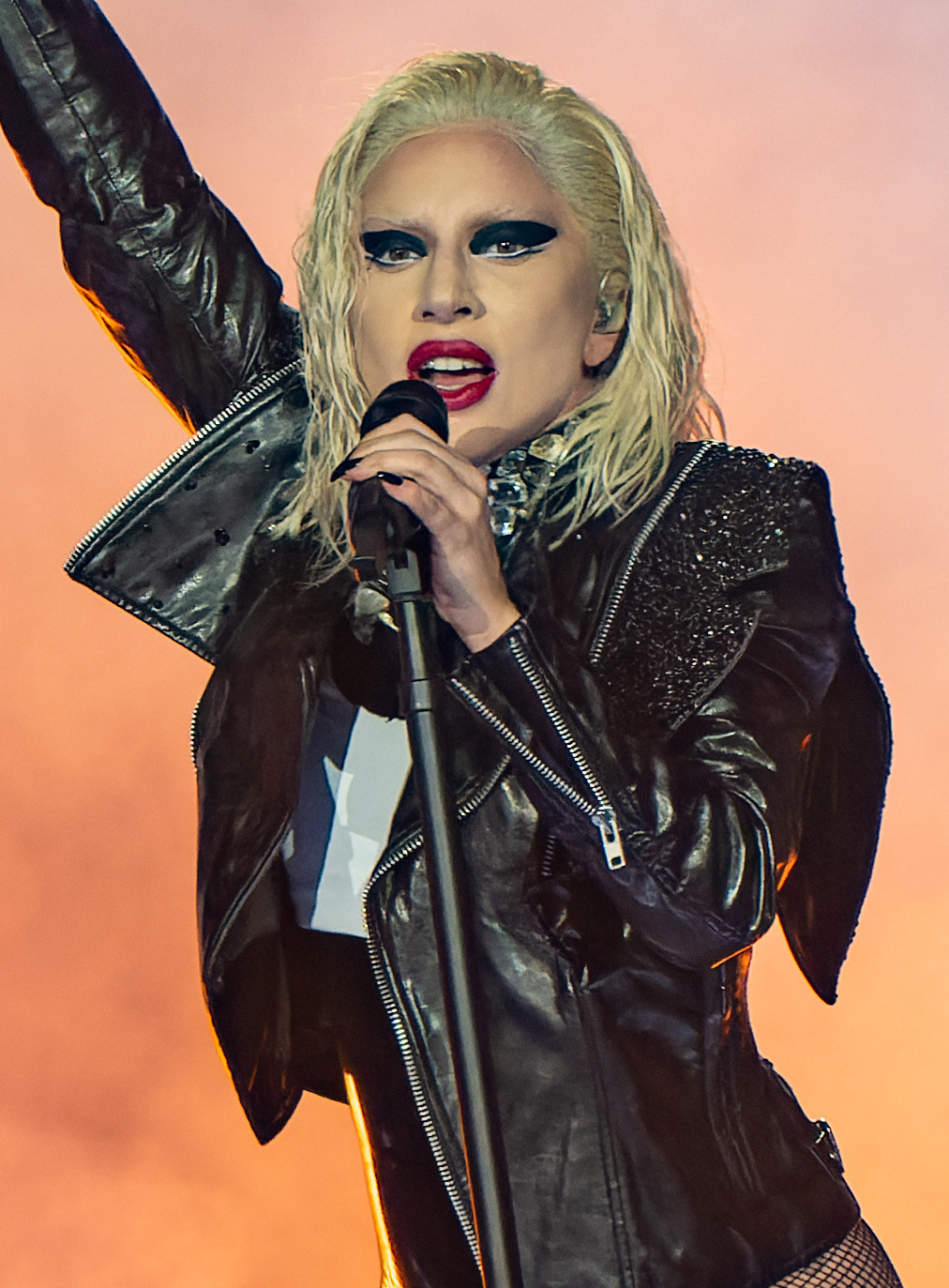
Gaga performing on The Chromatica Ball, her first all-stadium concert tour, in 2022

After endorsing Joe Biden in the 2020 United States presidential election, Gaga sang the US national anthem during his inauguration as the country's 46th president on January 20, 2021. In February, Gaga's dog walker Ryan Fischer was hospitalized after being shot in Hollywood. Two of Gaga's French Bulldogs were stolen, while a third dog escaped and was subsequently recovered by police. Gaga offered a $500,000 reward for the return of her dogs. Within a few days, a woman brought the two dogs, unharmed, to a police station in Los Angeles. Police initially said the woman did not appear to be involved in the shooting and theft, but on April 29, she was one of five people charged in connection with the crimes. In December 2022, James Howard Jackson, the man who shot Fischer, was sentenced to 21 years in prison.

In April 2021, Gaga teamed up with Champagne brand Dom Pérignon, and appeared in an ad shot by Nick Knight. On September 3, she released her third remix album, Dawn of Chromatica. This was followed by her second collaborative album with Tony Bennett, titled Love for Sale, on September 30. The record received generally favorable reviews, and debuted at number eight in the US. The album's promotional rollout included the television special One Last Time: An Evening with Tony Bennett and Lady Gaga, released in November 2021, on CBS, which featured select performances from the duo's August 3 and 5 performances at Radio City Music Hall. Another taped performance by the duo recorded for MTV Unplugged was released that December. At the 64th Annual Grammy Awards, Love for Sale won Gaga and Bennett the award for Best Traditional Pop Vocal Album.

After an appearance in the television special Friends: The Reunion, in which Gaga sang "Smelly Cat" with Lisa Kudrow, she portrayed Patrizia Reggiani, who was convicted of hiring a hitman to murder her ex-husband and former head of the Gucci fashion house Maurizio Gucci (played by Adam Driver), in Ridley Scott's biographical crime film titled House of Gucci. For the part, Gaga learned to speak with an Italian accent. She also stayed in character for 18 months, speaking with an accent for nine months during that period. Her method acting took a toll on her mental wellbeing, and towards the end of filming she had to be accompanied on-set by a psychiatric nurse. The film was released on November 24, 2021, to mixed reviews, though critics praised Gaga's performance as "note-perfect". She earned the New York Film Critics Circle Award, and nominations for the BAFTA Award, Critics' Choice Award, Golden Globe Award and Screen Actors Guild Award for Best Actress.

Gaga co-wrote the song "Hold My Hand" for the 2022 film Top Gun: Maverick, and also composed the score alongside Hans Zimmer and Harold Faltermeyer. She performed "Hold My Hand" live at the 95th Academy Awards, where it was nominated for Best Original Song. In July 2022, she embarked on The Chromatica Ball stadium tour, which concluded that September. It grossed $112.4 million from 834,000 tickets sold throughout twenty dates and produced an HBO concert special titled Gaga Chromatica Ball. By the end of the year, she became the highest grossing female artist touring in 2022. Gaga was appointed as co-chair of the President's Committee on the Arts and Humanities by President Joe Biden in April 2023, and collaborated with the Rolling Stones on the song "Sweet Sounds of Heaven", also featuring Stevie Wonder, from their album Hackney Diamonds later that year.

=== 2024–present: Joker: Folie à Deux and Mayhem ===
Gaga was the featured artist for season two of the online video game Fortnite spin-off, Fortnite Festival, which ran from February to April 2024. She became engaged to venture capitalist Michael Polansky that April, four years after they began dating. In July, she performed a rendition of Zizi Jeanmaire's "Mon truc en plumes" at the 2024 Summer Olympics opening ceremony in Paris. Gaga released the single "Die with a Smile", a duet with Bruno Mars, on August 16, 2024. In addition to topping the Billboard Global 200 for 18 weeks, it made Gaga the first act to achieve multiple US number-one songs in the 2000s, 2010s, and 2020s. The track topped the Billboard Hot 100 Year-End Chart of 2025, a first for Gaga, and was the most streamed song of 2025 globally by on-demand audio streams, with a total of 2.858 billion streams. At the 67th Annual Grammy Awards, it earned the award for Best Pop Duo/Group Performance, making Gaga the first artist to win the category three times.

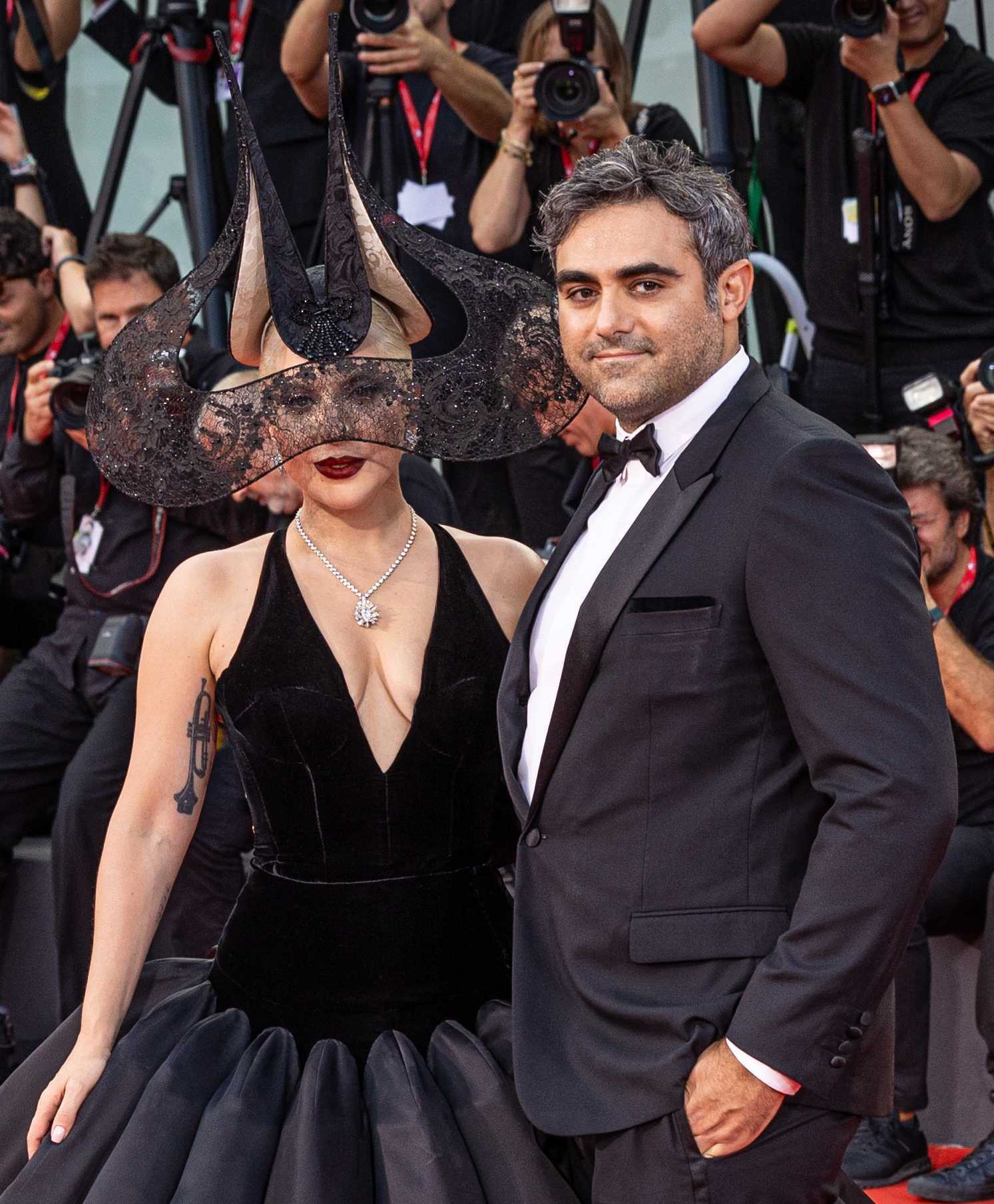
Gaga with fiancé Michael Polansky (pictured in 2024), who co-wrote songs on Harlequin and Mayhem with her

Gaga starred as Harleen "Lee" Quinzel alongside Joaquin Phoenix in Todd Phillips's musical psychological thriller Joker: Folie à Deux, the sequel to his 2019 film Joker. It premiered at the 81st Venice International Film Festival and was released theatrically in October 2024. While the film was a critical and commercial failure, Gaga's performance was better received, with critics finding her to be underused. Songs recorded by her and Phoenix for the film were included on an accompanying soundtrack album. Gaga additionally produced a companion album to the film, titled Harlequin, which was released on September 27, 2024. She and Polansky co-wrote four of its tracks. The two also created an associated concert film, Lady Gaga in Harlequin Live: One Night Only, released on December 24, 2025.

Gaga's album titled Mayhem—conceived as a pop record per Polansky's recommendation—was released on March 7, 2025, to critical acclaim and debuted at number one in the US. The couple served as executive producers for the album, and wrote seven tracks together. This included the lead single "Disease", which was released on October 25, 2024, and peaked at number seven in the UK. Its second single, "Abracadabra", followed on February 3, 2025, reaching the top five in Germany and the UK, as well as on the Global 200 chart. The track list also included "Die with a Smile" as a later addition. Gaga sang "Hold My Hand" at the Super Bowl LIX pregame as a tribute to the victims of the 2025 New Orleans truck attack, which won her the award for Outstanding Music Direction at the 46th Sports Emmy Awards. In March 2025, she hosted Saturday Night Live for a second time.

Gaga staged the concert series The Art of Personal Chaos, which consisted of an initial promotional run of concerts between April and May 2025, followed by The Mayhem Ball concert tour the following July. The former included a free concert at Copacabana Beach, Rio de Janeiro, as part of the "Todo Mundo no Rio" initiative, which became the most-attended concert by a female artist with an estimated audience of around 2.1 to 2.5 million. (Note: Promoter Live Nation and Gaga's representatives estimated an audience of 2.5 million, while local authorities reported 2.1 million.) The Mayhem Ball concluded in April 2026, becoming Gaga's highest-grossing tour to date, with earnings of $362.9 million from 1.6 million sold tickets. In September 2025, Gaga appeared in season two of the Netflix series Wednesday, portraying the ghost of a former Nevermore Academy teacher Rosaline Rotwood. She also released a song titled "The Dead Dance", accompanied by a Tim Burton-directed music video, which was featured in the series.

At the 68th Annual Grammy Awards, Gaga won Best Pop Vocal Album (Mayhem) and Best Dance Pop Recording ("Abracadabra"). During Bad Bunny's Super Bowl LX halftime show, she made a guest appearance and performed a salsa version of "Die with a Smile", accompanied by the group Los Sobrinos. Gaga had a cameo in the 2026 film The Devil Wears Prada 2, playing a fictionalized version of herself. She also recorded three original songs for the film's soundtrack, including the single "Runway" with Doechii. On May 14, 2026, Gaga released Apple Music Live: Mayhem Requiem, a concert film and live album featuring reimagined versions of songs from Mayhem. In June 2026, she and Polansky welcomed their first child, a daughter. As of August 2026, Gaga serves on the board of the AI biotech company Outer Biosciences, founded by Polansky in 2020. In September 2026, Gaga appeared in a commercial ad for the Japanese convenience store chain FamilyMart's 45th anniversary celebration.

== Artistry ==
=== Influences ===
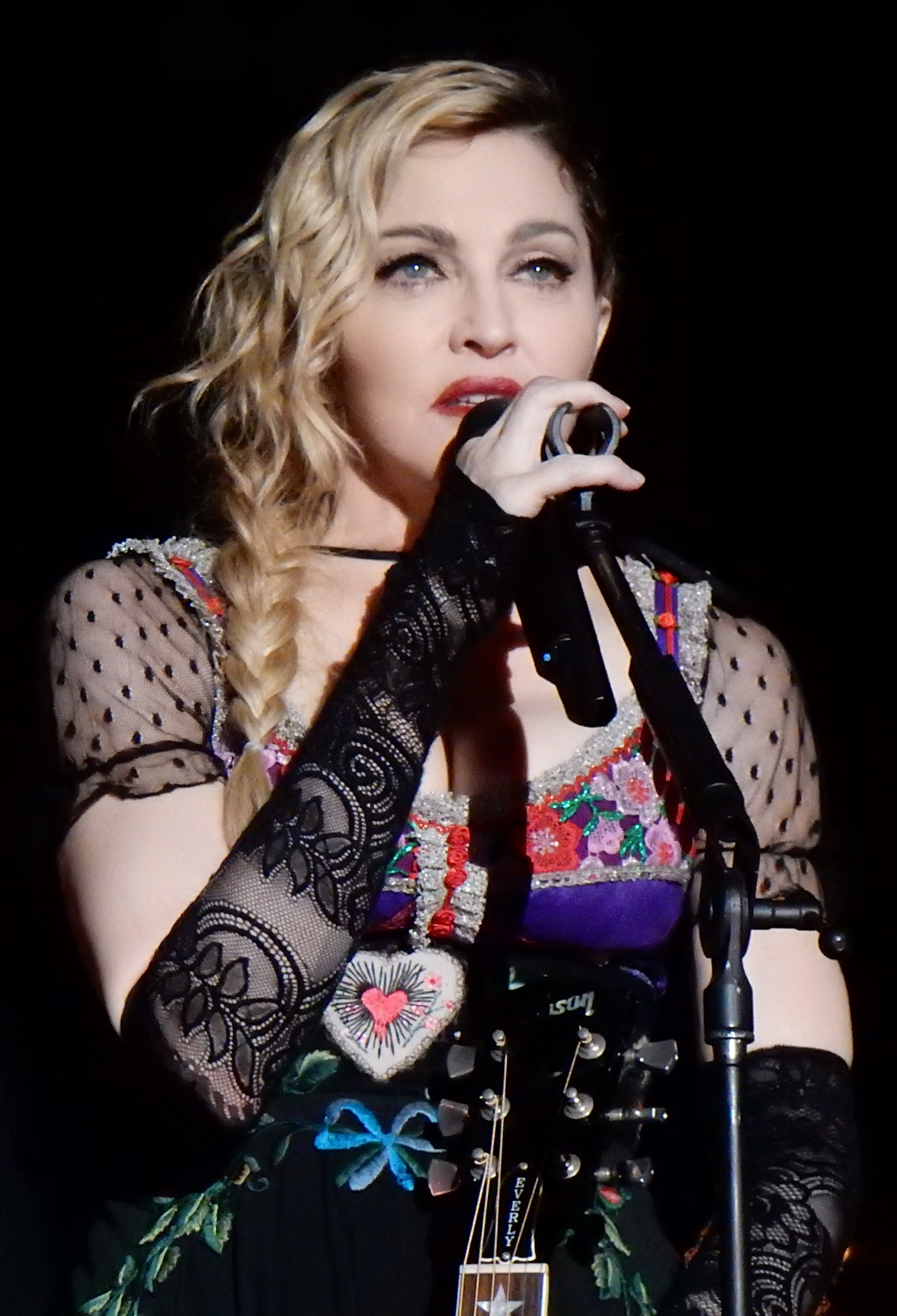
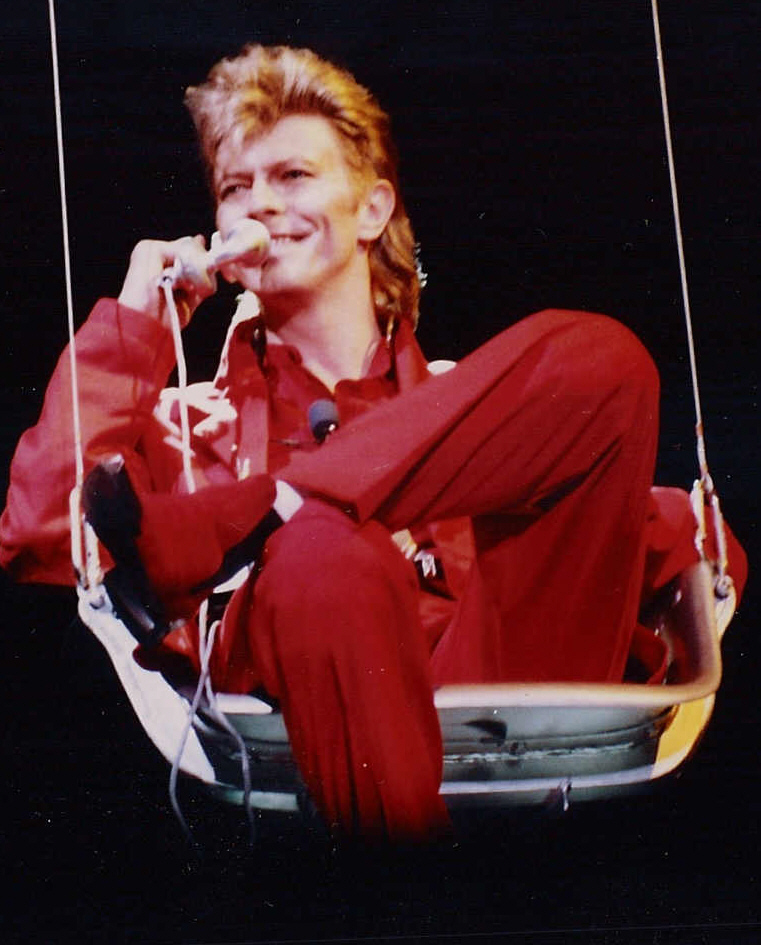
Musicians such as Madonna and David Bowie have influenced Gaga.

Gaga grew up listening to artists such as Michael Jackson, the Beatles, Stevie Wonder, Queen, Bruce Springsteen, Pink Floyd, Led Zeppelin, Whitney Houston, Elton John, Prince, En Vogue, TLC, Christina Aguilera, Janet Jackson, and Blondie, who have all influenced her music. Gaga's musical inspiration varies from dance-pop singers such as Madonna and Michael Jackson to glam rock artists such as David Bowie and Freddie Mercury, as well as the theatrics of the pop artist Andy Warhol and her own performance roots in musical theater. She has been compared to Madonna, who has said that she sees herself reflected in Gaga, while Gaga has expressed her desire to revolutionize pop music the way Madonna did. Gaga has also cited heavy metal bands as an influence, specifically Iron Maiden, Black Sabbath, Nine Inch Nails and Marilyn Manson. She has credited Beyoncé as a key inspiration to pursue a musical career. Her other inspirations include Grace Jones, Duke Ellington, and Carole King.

Gaga was inspired by her mother to be interested in fashion, which would later become a major influence and integrated with her music. Stylistically, Gaga has been compared to Leigh Bowery, Isabella Blow, and Cher; she once commented that as a child, she absorbed Cher's fashion sense and made it her own. Gaga became friends with British fashion designer Alexander McQueen shortly before his suicide in 2010, and became known for wearing his designs, particularly his towering armadillo shoes. She has called fashion designer Donatella Versace her muse; Versace referred to Gaga as "the fresh Donatella". Gaga has also been influenced by Princess Diana, whom she has admired since childhood.

Gaga has called the Indian alternative medicine advocate Deepak Chopra a "true inspiration", and has also quoted Indian leader Osho's book Creativity on Twitter. Gaga said she was influenced by Osho's work in valuing rebellion through creativity and equality.

=== Musical style and themes ===
Critics have analyzed and scrutinized Gaga's musical and performance style, as she has experimented with new ideas and images throughout her career. She has called the continual reinvention "liberating", and has been drawn to it since childhood. Gaga has said that synesthesia, characterized by her seeing colors while making music, has played a key role in her creative process, explaining: "As I'm writing, it assembles in my brain, then through the recording it becomes a full piece of colour. Every song is a different shade." Gaga's music spans a variety of music genres, primarily pop, dance, electronic, and jazz. She has also branched out into rock, disco, Americana, and country. Gaga's voice has been classified as a contralto, with a vocal range spanning from B♭_{2} to B_{5}. She has changed her vocal style regularly, and deemed Born This Way "much more vocally up to par with what I've always been capable of". In summing up her voice, Entertainment Weekly wrote: "There's an immense emotional intelligence behind the way she uses her voice. Almost never does she overwhelm a song with her vocal ability, recognizing instead that artistry is to be found in nuance rather than lung power."

According to Evan Sawdey of PopMatters, Gaga managed "to get you moving and grooving at an almost effortless pace" with The Fame. Gaga has said that she believes "all good music can be played on a piano and still sound like a hit". Simon Reynolds wrote in 2010: "Everything about Gaga came from electroclash, except the music, which wasn't particularly 1980s, just ruthlessly catchy naughties pop glazed with Auto-Tune and undergirded with R&B-ish beats."

Gaga's songs have covered a wide variety of concepts; The Fame discusses the lust for stardom, while The Fame Monster expresses fame's dark side through monster metaphors. The Fame is an electropop and dance-pop album that has influences of 1980s pop and 1990s Europop, whereas The Fame Monster displays Gaga's taste for pastiche, drawing on "Seventies arena glam, perky ABBA disco, and sugary throwbacks like Stacey Q". Born This Way has lyrics in English, French, German, and Spanish and features themes common to Gaga's controversial songwriting such as sex, love, religion, money, drugs, identity, liberation, sexuality, freedom, and individualism. The album explores new genres, such as electronic rock and techno.

The themes in Artpop revolve around Gaga's personal views of fame, love, sex, feminism, self-empowerment, overcoming addiction, and reactions to media scrutiny. Billboard described Artpop as "coherently channeling R&B, techno, disco and rock music". With Cheek to Cheek, Gaga pursued the jazz genre. Joanne, exploring the genres of country, funk, pop, dance, rock, electronic music and folk, was influenced by her personal life. The A Star Is Born soundtrack contains elements of blues rock, country and bubblegum pop. Billboard commented that its lyrics are about wanting change, its struggle, love, romance, and bonding, describing the music as "timeless, emotional, gritty and earnest. They sound like songs written by artists who, quite frankly, are supremely messed up but hit to the core of the listener."

On Chromatica, Gaga returned to her dance-pop roots, and discussed her struggles with mental health. Love for Sale and Harlequin expand on her venture into jazz music. The former consists of a tribute to Cole Porter, while the latter was inspired by her role in Joker: Folie à Deux. With Mayhem, Gaga aimed to revisit "the pop music my earliest fans loved." Described by Billboard as a "chaotic blur of genres", it incorporates synth-pop, with industrial dance influences, and elements of electro, disco, industrial pop, rock and pop rock. Lyrically, it explores themes of love, chaos, fame, identity, and desire, using metaphors of transformation, duality, and excess.

=== Videos and stage ===
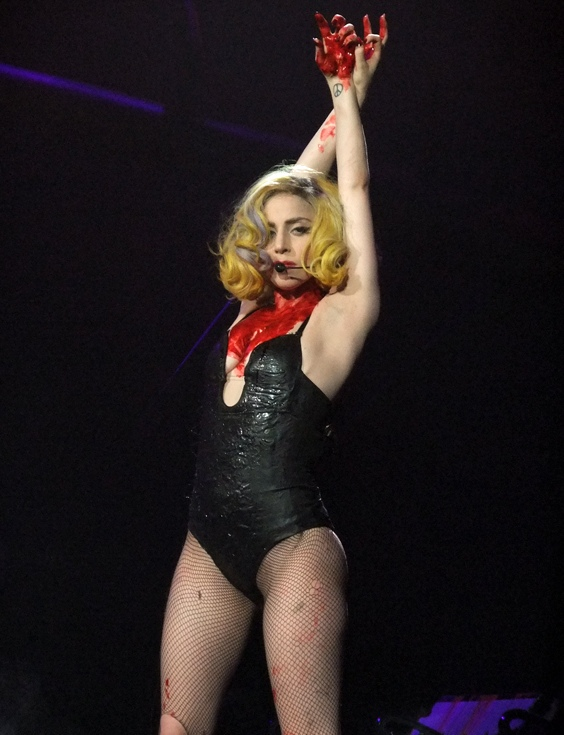
Gaga during a "blood-soaked" performance in 2010.

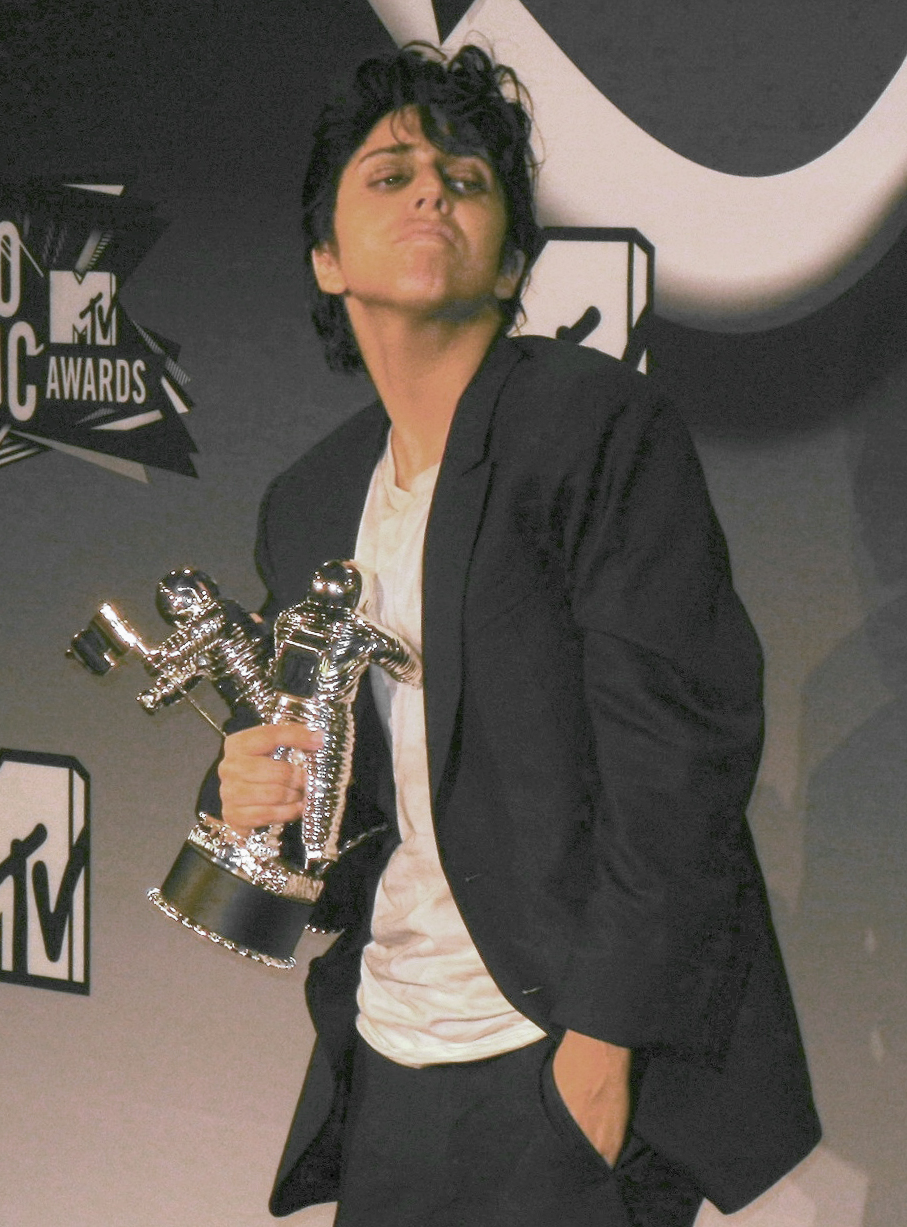
Gaga as her male alter ego Jo Calderone in 2011.

Featuring constant costume changes and provocative visuals, Gaga's music videos are often described as short films. The video for "Telephone" earned Gaga the Guinness World Record for Most Product Placement in a Video. According to author Curtis Fogel, she explores bondage and sadomasochism and highlights prevalent feminist themes. The main themes of her music videos are sex, violence, and power. She has called herself "a little bit of a feminist" and asserted that she is "sexually empowering women". Billboard ranked her sixth on its list of "The 100 Greatest Music Video Artists of All Time" in 2020, stating that "the name 'Lady Gaga' will forever be synonymous with culture-shifting music videos".

Regarded as "one of the greatest living musical performers" by Rolling Stone, Gaga has called herself a perfectionist when it comes to her elaborate shows. Her performances have been described as "highly entertaining and innovative"; the blood-spurting performance of "Paparazzi" at the 2009 MTV Video Music Awards was described as "eye-popping" by MTV News and ranked among the best MTV VMA performances of all time by various publications. She continued the blood-soaked theme during The Monster Ball Tour, causing protests in England from family groups and fans in the aftermath of the Cumbria shootings, in which a taxi driver had killed 12 people, then himself. At the 2011 MTV Video Music Awards, Gaga appeared in drag as her male alter ego, Jo Calderone, and delivered a lovesick monologue before performing her song "You and I". She stated that she created the character to explore "what I was looking for in men, and also what I was maybe lacking in myself". When asked about the persona in 2025, she said that Calderone was "no longer with us". As Gaga's choreographer and creative director, Laurieann Gibson provided material for her shows and videos for four years before she was replaced by her assistant Richard Jackson in 2014.

In an October 2018 article for Billboard, Rebecca Schiller traced back Gaga's videography from "Just Dance" to the release of A Star Is Born. Schiller noted that following the Artpop era, Gaga's stripped-down approach to music was reflected in the clips for the singles from Joanne, taking the example of the music video of lead single "Perfect Illusion" where she eschewed "the elaborate outfits for shorts and a tee-shirt as she performed the song at a desert party". It continued with her performances in the film as well as her stage persona. Reviewing The Chromatica Ball in 2022, Chris Willman of Variety wrote that Gaga "could have further played the authenticity card for all it's worth" after the release of Joanne and A Star Is Born, but instead "has determined to keep herself weird — or just weird enough to provide necessarily ballast to her more earnest inclinations".

== Public image ==
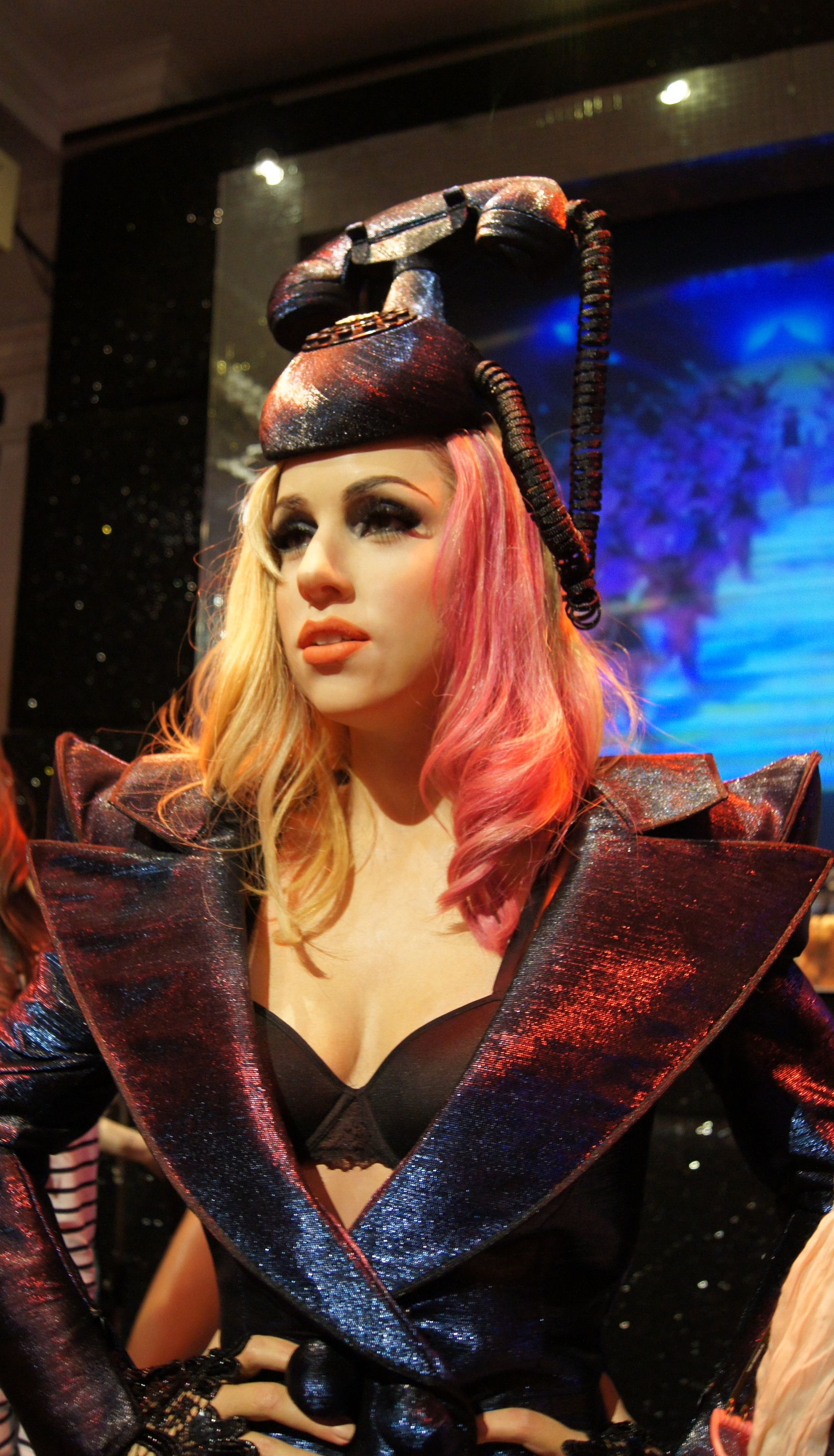
In 2010, eight wax figures of Gaga were installed at the museum Madame Tussauds.

Public reception of Gaga's music, fashion sense, and persona is polarized. She is noted for her outlandish fashion sense, which has served as an important aspect of her character. During her early career, members of the media compared her fashion choices to those of Christina Aguilera. When she met briefly with then-president Barack Obama at a Human Rights Campaign fundraiser, he found the interaction "intimidating" as she was dressed in 16-inch (40 cm) heels, making her the tallest woman in the room. When interviewed by Barbara Walters for her annual ABC News special 10 Most Fascinating People in 2009, she dismissed the claim that she is intersex as an urban legend. Responding to a question on this issue, she expressed her fondness for androgyny.

In 2011, 121 women gathered at the Grammy Awards dressed in costumes similar to those worn by Gaga, earning the 2011 Guinness World Record for Largest Gathering of Lady Gaga Impersonators. The Global Language Monitor named "Lady Gaga" as the Top Fashion Buzzword with her trademark "no pants" a close third. Entertainment Weekly put her outfits on its end of the decade "best-of" list, saying that she "brought performance art into the mainstream". People ranked her number one on their "Best Dressed Stars of 2021" list, writing that Gaga "strutted the streets in high-fashion designs, from a sculptural seersucker number to a black lace corseted gown—accessorizing each with elegant updos, sky-high heels and retro shades—like it was no sweat."

Time placed Gaga on their All-Time 100 Fashion Icons list, stating: "Lady Gaga is just as notorious for her outrageous style as she is for her pop hits", mentioning outfits "made from plastic bubbles, Kermit the Frog dolls, and raw meat". Gaga wore a dress made of raw beef to the 2010 MTV Video Music Awards, which was supplemented by boots, a purse, and a hat also made out of raw beef. Partly awarded in recognition of the dress, Vogue named her one of the Best Dressed people of 2010 and Time named the dress the Fashion Statement of the year. It attracted the attention of worldwide media; the animal rights organization People for the Ethical Treatment of Animals (PETA) found it offensive. The meat dress was displayed at the National Museum of Women in the Arts in 2012, and entered the Rock and Roll Hall of Fame in September 2015.

Gaga's fans call her "Mother Monster", and she often refers to them as "Little Monsters", a phrase she had tattooed on herself in dedication. In his article "Lady Gaga Pioneered Online Fandom Culture As We Know It" for Vice, Jake Hall wrote that Gaga inspired several subsequent fan-brandings, such as those of Taylor Swift, Rihanna and Justin Bieber. In July 2012, Gaga also co-founded the social networking service LittleMonsters.com, devoted to her fans. Scott Hardy, CEO of Polaroid, praised Gaga for inspiring fans and for her close interactions with them on social media.

=== Censorship ===
In 2011, lyrics of Gaga's song "Born This Way", which reference homosexuality and LGBTQ subjects, were censored by Malaysian broadcaster AMP Radio Networks as a precaution against government restrictions against songs which might violate "good taste or decency or [are] offensive to public feeling". The same year, the Ministry of Culture of the People's Republic of China, reportedly enforcing a directive designed to tackle "poor taste and vulgar content", banned the publication of six of Gaga's songs from the album Born This Way on all Chinese music websites.

In 2014, her album Artpop was released in China with conditions being placed on the album artwork, covering her almost naked body as well as changing the title of the song "Sexxx Dreams" to "X Dreams". In 2016, her meeting with the Dalai Lama resulted in the Chinese government adding her to a list of hostile foreign forces, and Chinese websites and media organizations were ordered to stop distributing her songs. The Publicity Department of the Chinese Communist Party also issued an order for state-controlled media to condemn the meeting. In 2019, coverage of Gaga in the 91st Academy Awards was removed on some Chinese streaming platforms such as Mango TV and in 2021 her appearance was cut from Friends: The Reunion; both incidents received backlash from Chinese fans.

== Activism ==
=== Philanthropy ===
After declining an invitation to appear on the single "We Are the World 25 for Haiti", because of rehearsals for her tour, to benefit victims of the 2010 Haiti earthquake, Gaga donated the proceeds of her January 2010 Radio City Music Hall concert to the country's reconstruction relief fund. All profits from her online store that day were also donated, and Gaga announced that $500,000 was collected for the fund. Hours after the 2011 Tōhoku earthquake and tsunami hit Japan, Gaga tweeted a link to Japan Prayer Bracelets. All revenue from a bracelet she designed in conjunction with the company was donated to relief efforts; these raised $1.5 million. In June 2011, Gaga performed at MTV Japan's charity show in Makuhari Messe, which benefited the Japanese Red Cross.

In 2012, Gaga joined the campaign group Artists Against Fracking. That October, Yoko Ono gave Gaga and four other activists the LennonOno Grant for Peace in Reykjavík, Iceland. The following month, Gaga pledged to donate $1 million to the American Red Cross to help the victims of Hurricane Sandy. Gaga has also contributed to the fight against HIV and AIDS, focusing on educating young women about the risks of the disease. In collaboration with Cyndi Lauper, Gaga joined forces with MAC Cosmetics to launch a line of lipstick under their supplementary cosmetic line, Viva Glam. Sales have raised more than $202 million to fight HIV and AIDS.

In April 2016, Gaga joined Vice President Joe Biden at the University of Nevada, Las Vegas to support his It's On Us campaign as he traveled to colleges on behalf of the organization, which has seen 250,000 students from more than 530 colleges sign a pledge of solidarity and activism. Two months later, Gaga attended the 84th Annual US Conference of Mayors in Indianapolis where together with the Dalai Lama she talked about the power of kindness and how to make the world a more compassionate place.

In April 2020, Gaga curated the televised benefit concert, One World: Together at Home, a collaboration with Global Citizen to benefit the World Health Organization's COVID-19 Solidarity Response Fund. The special raised $127 million, which according to Forbes "puts it on par with the other legendary fundraiser, Live Aid, as the highest grossing charity concert in history." In recognition of her activism for the Black Lives Matter movement during the 2020 George Floyd protests, Gaga received the King Center's Yolanda Denise King High Ground Award in January 2021. In her acceptance speech, she denounced racism and white supremacy and addressed her social responsibility as a high-profile artist and white woman.

=== Born This Way Foundation ===
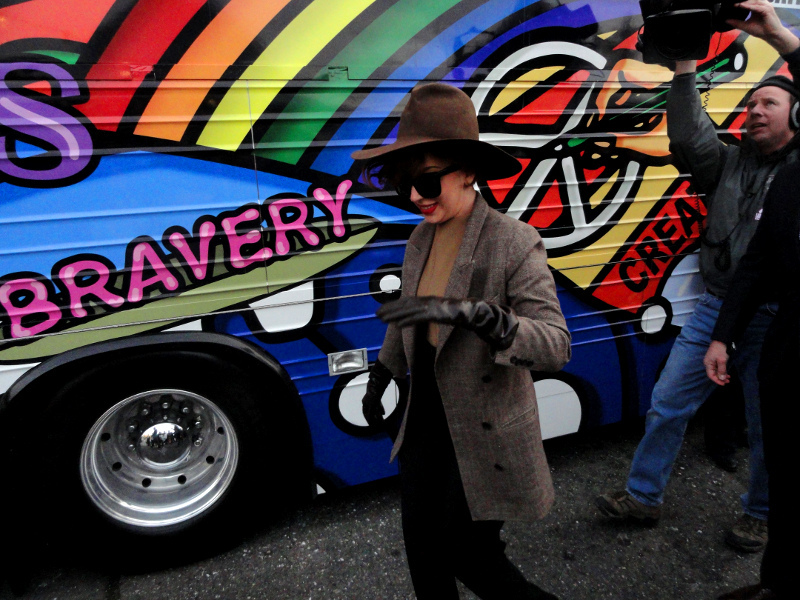
Gaga during an event for the Born This Way Foundation in Europe, 2013

In 2012, Gaga launched the Born This Way Foundation (BTWF), a non-profit organization that focuses on youth empowerment. It has been named after her 2011 single and album. Media proprietor Oprah Winfrey, writer Deepak Chopra, and US Secretary of Health and Human Services Kathleen Sebelius spoke at the foundation's inauguration at Harvard University. The foundation's original funding included $1.2 million from Gaga, $500,000 from the MacArthur Foundation, and $850,000 from Barneys New York. In July 2012, the BTWF partnered with Office Depot for a series of limited edition back-to-school products, with 25% of its sales going towards the foundation, for a guaranteed donation of $1 million. The foundation's initiatives have included the "Born Brave Bus" that followed Gaga on tour as a youth drop-in center as an initiative against bullying.

In October 2015, at the Yale Center for Emotional Intelligence, Gaga joined 200 high school students, policy makers, and academic officials, including Peter Salovey, to discuss ways to recognize and channel emotions for positive outcomes. In 2016, the foundation partnered with Intel, Vox Media, and Recode to fight online harassment. The sales revenue of the 99th issue of the V magazine, which featured Gaga and Kinney, was donated to the foundation. Gaga and Elton John released the clothing and accessories line Love Bravery at Macy's in May 2016. 25% of each purchase benefited the BTWF and the Elton John AIDS Foundation. Gaga partnered with Starbucks for a week in June 2017 with the "Cups of Kindness" campaign, where the company donated 25 cents from some of the beverages sold to the foundation. She also appeared in a video by Staples Inc. to raise funds for the foundation and DonorsChoose.org.

On the 2018 World Kindness Day, Gaga partnered with the foundation to bring food and relief to a Red Cross shelter for people who have been forced to evacuate homes due to the California wildfires. The foundation also partnered with Starbucks and SoulCycle to thank California firefighters for their relief work during the crisis. Gaga had to previously evacuate her own home during the Woolsey Fire which spread through parts of Malibu. In March 2019, she penned a letter to supporters of the BTWF, announcing the launch of a new pilot program for a teen mental health first aid project with the National Council for Behavioral Health. Gaga revealed her personal struggles with mental health in her letter and how she was able to get support which saved her life: "I know what it means to have someone support me and understand what I'm going through, and every young person in the world should have someone to turn to when they're hurting. It saved my life, and it will save theirs."

In September 2020, Gaga released an anthology book, Channel Kindness: Stories of Kindness and Community, featuring fifty-one stories about kindness, bravery, and resilience from young people all over the world collected by the BTWF, and introduced by herself. She promoted it with a 21 days of kindness challenge on her social media, using the "BeKind21" hashtag. In 2021, Gaga collaborated with the Champagne house Dom Pérignon to benefit the BTWF by releasing a limited edition of Rosé Vintage 2005 bottles along with a sculpture designed by her. The 110 exclusive pieces were sold at private sales, and the profit of $570,000 was donated to the foundation. On the 2021 World Kindness Day, Gaga released a 30-minute special, titled The Power of Kindness, as part of the foundation's Channel Kindness program, in which together with a mental health expert and a group of eleven young people, she explored the connection between kindness and mental health.

=== LGBTQ advocacy ===
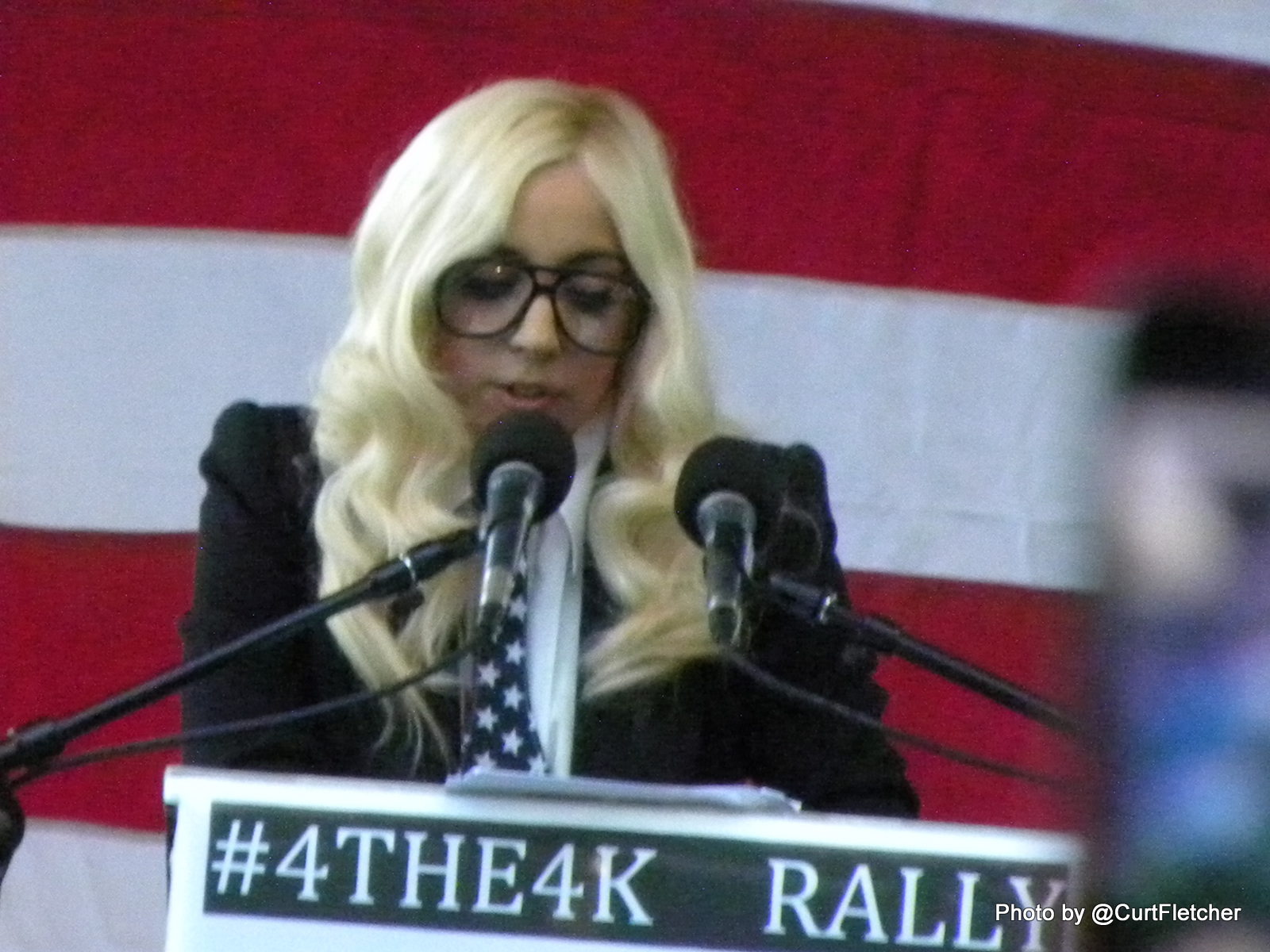
Gaga speaking against "don't ask, don't tell" in Portland, Maine (2010)

A bisexual woman, (Note: Gaga says that the song "Poker Face" was about her bisexuality, and she openly speaks about how her past boyfriends were uncomfortable with her sexual orientation.) Gaga has supported LGBTQ rights worldwide. She has attributed much of her early success as a mainstream artist to her gay fans and is considered a gay icon. Early in her career, Gaga had difficulty getting radio airplay, and stated: "The turning point for me was the gay community." She thanked FlyLife, a Manhattan-based LGBTQ marketing company which worked with her label Interscope at the time, in the liner notes of The Fame. One of her first televised performances was in May 2008 at the NewNowNext Awards, an awards show aired by the LGBTQ television network Logo.

Gaga spoke at the 2009 National Equality March in Washington, D.C., to support the LGBTQ rights movement. She attended the 2010 MTV Video Music Awards accompanied by four gay and lesbian former members of the United States Armed Forces who had been unable to serve openly under the US military's "don't ask, don't tell" policy, which banned open homosexuality in the military. Gaga urged her fans via YouTube to contact their senators in an effort to overturn the policy. In September 2010, she spoke at a Servicemembers Legal Defense Network's rally in Portland, Maine. Following this event, The Advocate named her a "fierce advocate" for gays and lesbians.

Gaga appeared at Europride, an international event dedicated to LGBTQ pride, in Rome in June 2011. She criticized the poor state of gay rights in many European countries and described gay people as "revolutionaries of love". Later that year, she was referenced by teenager Jamey Rodemeyer in the hours prior to his death, with Rodemeyer having tweeted "@ladygaga bye mother monster, thank you for all you have done, paws up forever". Rodemeyer's suicide prompted Gaga to meet with then-President Barack Obama to address anti-gay bullying in American schools. She later endorsed him during the 2012 US presidential election. In 2011, Gaga was also ordained as a minister by the Universal Life Church Monastery allowing her to officiate the wedding of two female friends.

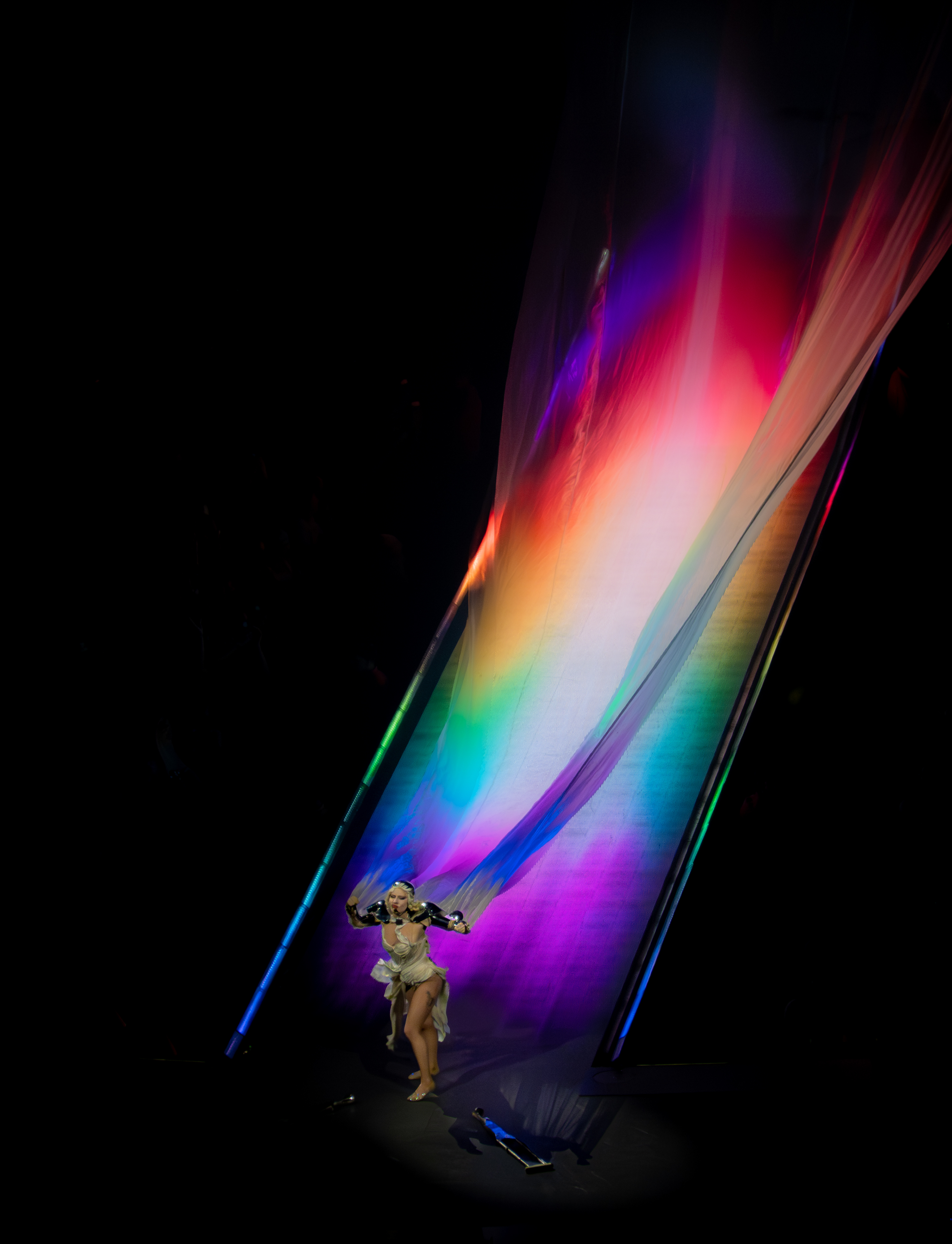
Gaga at her Mayhem Ball tour in 2025, with rainbow lights projected onto her long white cape

In June 2016, during a vigil held in Los Angeles for victims of the attack at the gay nightclub Pulse in Orlando, Gaga read aloud the names of the 49 people killed in the attack, and gave a speech. She also appeared in Human Rights Campaign's tribute video to the victims of the attack. Following Joan Jett, Gaga was the second of nearly 200 musicians and music industry executives to sign Billboard's Open Letter on Gun Violence, demanding that Congress enact universal background checks on all gun buyers. She subsequently supported the 2018 March for Our Lives gun-control rally in Washington, D.C. Gaga opposed the presidency of Donald Trump and his military transgender ban. She supported former Secretary of State Hillary Clinton for president in 2016. In 2018, a leaked memo from Trump's office revealed that his administration wanted to change the legal definition of sex to exclude transgender Americans. Gaga was one of the many celebrities to condemn him and spread the #WontBeErased campaign to her Twitter followers.

In January 2019, during one of her Enigma shows, she criticized Vice President Mike Pence for his wife Karen Pence working at an evangelical Christian school where LGBTQ people are turned away, calling him "the worst representation of what it means to be a Christian". Gaga also stated: "I am a Christian woman, and what I do know about Christianity is that we bear no prejudice, and everybody is welcome". Gaga made a congratulatory speech commemorating the 50th anniversary of the Stonewall riots and the LGBTQ community's accomplishments at WorldPride NYC 2019 outside the Stonewall Inn, birthplace of the modern gay rights movement. Following Trump's win in the 2024 US presidential election, in which Gaga endorsed Kamala Harris, she voiced her support for the transgender community after his rollback of their protections.

== Legacy ==
Gaga was named the "Queen of Pop" in a 2011 ranking by Rolling Stone based on record sales and social media metrics. In 2012, she ranked fourth in VH1's Greatest Women in Music, and became a feature of the temporary exhibition The Elevated. From the Pharaoh to Lady Gaga, which marked the 150th anniversary of the National Museum in Warsaw.

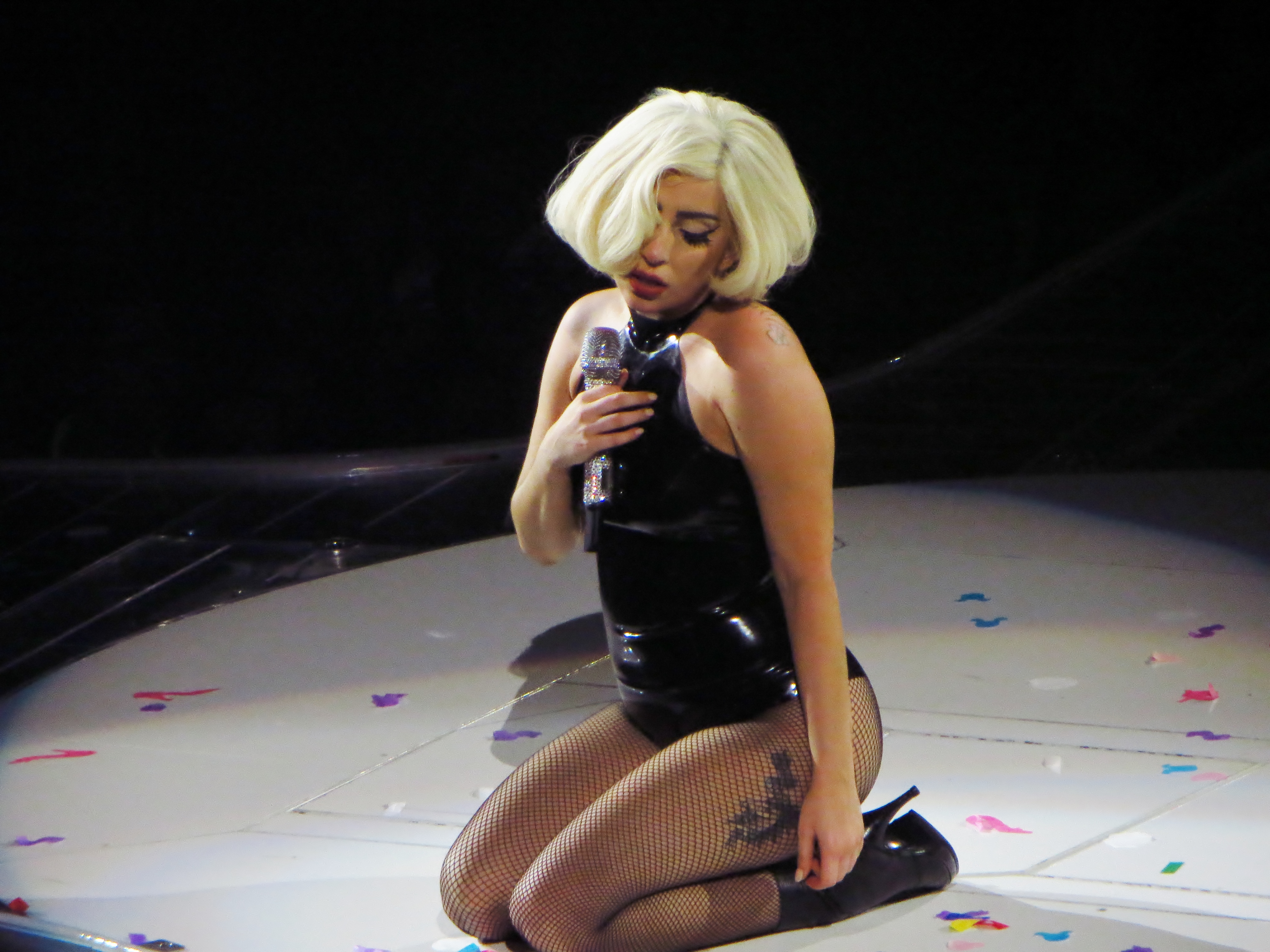
Gaga performing on the ArtRave: The Artpop Ball tour in 2014

Gaga has often been praised for using controversy to bring attention to various issues. According to Frankie Graddon of The Independent, Gaga—who wore a meat dress to highlight her distaste for the US military's "don't ask, don't tell" policy—influenced protest dressing on red carpet. Billboard named her the "Greatest Pop Star" of 2009, asserting that "to say that her one-year rise from rookie to MVP was meteoric doesn't quite cut it, as she wasn't just successful, but game-changing—thanks to her voracious appetite for reinvention." Because of The Fame's success—it was listed as one of the 100 Greatest Debut Albums of All-Time by Rolling Stone in 2013—Gaga has been credited as one of the musicians that popularized synth-pop in the late 2000s and early 2010s.

According to Kelefa Sanneh of The New Yorker, "Lady Gaga blazed a trail for truculent pop stars by treating her own celebrity as an evolving art project." Including Born This Way as one of the 50 best female albums of all time, Rolling Stone's Rob Sheffield considers it "hard to remember a world where we didn't have Gaga, although we're pretty sure it was a lot more boring". In 2015, Time noted that Gaga had "practically invented the current era of pop music as spectacle". A decade later, Daniel D'Addario of Variety further observed the influence of Gaga's sense of spectacle on the next generation of artists, calling her "a pop star's pop star". He surmised that Sabrina Carpenter's use of self-parodying and ultra-glam camp in her performances, Billie Eilish's incorporation of grandeur into her shows, and Chappell Roan's "drag-inflected let's-put-on-a-show spirit" and "eagerness to use costumes and makeup to help tell her stories" all came from each watching the video for "Bad Romance" in their childhoods.

A 2017 journal published by Psychology of Aesthetics, Creativity, and the Arts studying structural patterns in melodies of earworm songs compiled lists of catchiest tracks from 3,000 participants, in which Gaga's "Bad Romance", "Alejandro", and "Poker Face" ranked number one, eight, and nine, respectively. In 2018, NPR wrote she was the second most influential female artist of the 21st century, calling her "one of the first big artists of the 'Internet age'". Billboard placed Gaga fifth on its 2024 "Greatest Pop Stars of the 21st Century" list, and sixth on the 2025 "Top 100 Women Artists of the 21st Century" list. She and her work have influenced various artists including Miley Cyrus, Nicki Minaj, Ellie Goulding, Halsey, Jennifer Lopez, Beyoncé, Nick Jonas, Sam Smith, Noah Cyrus, Katherine Langford, MGMT, Allie X, Greyson Chance, Cardi B, Rina Sawayama, Blackpink, Madison Beer, Ren of NU'EST, Slayyyter, Bebe Rexha, Bree Runway, Celeste, Kim Petras, JoJo Siwa, Pabllo Vittar, Ava Max, Doja Cat, Chaeyoung of Twice, Kanye West, Rachel Zegler, SZA, Raye, Rebecca Black, Grace Gaustad, Laufey, and Chappell Roan.

Various higher education institutions have offered courses focusing on Gaga. Due to her influence on 21st century culture and her rise to global fame, sociologist Mathieu Deflem of the University of South Carolina launched a course titled "Lady Gaga and the Sociology of the Fame" in early 2011 with the objective of unraveling "some of the sociologically relevant dimensions of the fame of Lady Gaga". Focusing on her influence on gender and sexual identity, the University of Virginia College of Arts and Sciences introduced a writing course titled "GaGa for Gaga: Sex, Gender, and Identity" during its Fall 2010 semester, which explored "how identity is challenged by gender and sexuality and how Lady Gaga confronts this challenge". Courses exploring different aspects of Gaga's phenomenon, including her music and fame, have also been offered by Arizona State University, Tufts University, St. Catherine University, and the University of Richmond.

A new genus of ferns, Gaga, and its species, G. germanotta and G. monstraparva, have been named in her honor. The name monstraparva alluded to Gaga's fans, known as Little Monsters, since their symbol is the outstretched "monster claw" hand, which resembles a tightly rolled young fern leaf prior to unfurling. Gaga also has an extinct mammal, Gagadon minimonstrum, a parasitic wasp, Aleiodes gaga, and a treehopper, Kaikaia gaga, named for her.

In Taichung, Taiwan, July 3 is designated as "Lady Gaga Day" marking the first day Gaga visited the country in 2011. In May 2021, to celebrate the tenth anniversary of Born This Way and its cultural impact, West Hollywood mayor, Lindsey P. Horvath, presented Gaga with a key to the city and declared May 23 as "Born This Way Day". A street painting with the Daniel Quasar's version of the pride flag featuring the album's title was also unveiled on Robertson Boulevard as a tribute to the album, and how it has inspired the LGBTQ community over the years.

== Achievements ==
Gaga has won sixteen Grammy Awards, an Academy Award, a Sports Emmy Award, two Golden Globe Awards, a BAFTA Award, twenty two MTV Video Music Awards (including the inaugural Tricon Award), three Brit Awards, and eighteen Guinness World Records. She has been honored with the inaugural Songwriters Hall of Fame Contemporary Icon Award as a songwriter-artist who has attained an iconic status in pop culture. She also received the National Arts Awards' Young Artist Award, honoring individuals who have shown accomplishments and leadership early in their career, and the Grammy Museum Jane Ortner Artist Award, which recognizes artists who have demonstrated passion and dedication to education through the arts. The Council of Fashion Designers of America recognized her with the Fashion Icon award. In 2019, Gaga became the first person to win an Academy, BAFTA, Golden Globe, and Grammy Award in one year for her contributions to the A Star Is Born soundtrack. In 2023, Rolling Stone included her among the 200 Greatest Singers of All Time.

With estimated sales of 124 million records, Gaga is one of the world's best-selling music artists. She is the first female artist to have four singles ("Just Dance", "Poker Face", "Bad Romance" and "Shallow") each sell at least 10 million copies globally. As of 2026, she has grossed more than $1.1 billion in revenue from concert tours and residencies, with attendance of 8.4 million, being the sixth woman to pass the billion total as reported to Billboard Boxscore, receiving the Pollstar Award for Pop Touring Artist of the Decade (2010s). She is also among the top digital singles artists in the US, with 87.5 million equivalent units certified according to Recording Industry Association of America (RIAA), (Note: As of February 2024, Gaga has had cumulative single certifications of 82.5 million digital downloads and on-demand streaming as a solo artist, and 5 million with Bradley Cooper.) was the first woman to receive the Digital Diamond Award certification from RIAA, one of the few artists with at least three Diamond certified songs ("Bad Romance", "Poker Face" and "Just Dance"), and the first artist to have two songs pass seven million downloads ("Poker Face" and "Just Dance").

Named Billboard's Artist of the Year in 2010, Gaga subsequently appeared on its "Greatest of All Time Artists" chart. She became the longest-reigning act of Billboard's Dance/Electronic Albums chart with 211 weeks at number one, while The Fame spent a record 142 weeks atop the chart. As of 2020, six of her singles appeared on the International Federation of the Phonographic Industry's annual Top 10 Global Singles chart ("Just Dance", "Poker Face", "Bad Romance", "Telephone", "Born This Way" and "Shallow"), setting the record for the most entries by any female artist.

According to Guinness World Records, Gaga was the most followed person on Twitter from 2011 to 2013, the most famous celebrity in 2013, and the most powerful popstar in 2014. She was included on Forbes' Celebrity 100 from 2010 to 2015 and 2018 to 2020, topping the list in 2011. Gaga also appeared on their list of the World's Most Powerful Women from 2010 to 2014, and topped their list of the Most Powerful Musicians in 2013. She was named one of the 100 most influential people in the world by Time magazine in 2010 and 2019, and ranked second in its most influential people of the past ten years readers' poll in 2013.

As of October 2020, Forbes estimated Gaga's net worth at $150 million. (Note: In February 2016, Forbes estimated Gaga's net worth at $275 million.) The magazine named her the world's highest-paid female musician in 2011 with $90 million, and the fourth top-earning female musician of the 2010s with $500 million. In 2012, she placed fourth on Billboard's list of the top moneymakers of 2011 with earnings of $25 million, which included sales from Born This Way and her Monster Ball Tour.

== Discography ==
Solo studio albums

- The Fame (2008) (reissued in 2009 as The Fame Monster)
- Born This Way (2011)
- Artpop (2013)
- Joanne (2016)
- Chromatica (2020)
- Mayhem (2025)

Collaborative studio albums

- Cheek to Cheek (with Tony Bennett) (2014)
- Love for Sale (with Tony Bennett) (2021)

== Tours and residencies ==
Headlining tours

- The Fame Ball Tour (2009)
- The Monster Ball Tour (2009–2011)
- Born This Way Ball (2012–2013)
- ArtRave: The Artpop Ball (2014)
- Joanne World Tour (2017–2018)
- The Chromatica Ball (2022)
- The Mayhem Ball (2025–2026)

Co-headlining tours

- Cheek to Cheek Tour (with Tony Bennett) (2014–2015)

Residencies

- Lady Gaga Live at Roseland Ballroom (2014)
- Lady Gaga Enigma + Jazz & Piano (2018–2024)

== Filmography ==
Film

- Machete Kills (2013)
- Sin City: A Dame to Kill For (2014)
- A Star Is Born (2018)
- House of Gucci (2021)
- Joker: Folie à Deux (2024)
- The Devil Wears Prada 2 (2026)

Television

- American Horror Story: Hotel (2015–2016)
- American Horror Story: Roanoke (2016)
- Wednesday (2025)

== See also ==
- Artists with the most number-ones on the U.S. Dance Club Songs chart
- Forbes list of highest-earning musicians
- List of actors with Academy Award nominations
- List of LGBTQ people from New York City
- List of Billboard Social 50 number-one artists
- List of most-followed Twitter accounts
