= The Power of Kindness =

Digital special

- Directed by: Niharika Desai
- Produced by: James Shani
- Starring: Lady Gaga, Dr. Alfiee Breland-Noble
- Production company: Asylum Films
- Release date: November 13, 2021
- Running time: 30 minutes, 26 seconds
- Country: United States
- Language: English

The Power of Kindness is a 2021 Facebook Watch digital special hosted by Lady Gaga for World Kindness Day. Produced by James Shani's Asylum Films and Lady Gaga’s Born This Way Foundation, the 30-minute documentary short film aired on Facebook Watch on November 13, 2021, and features psychologist, author, mental health expert, and founder of the AAKOMA Project, Dr. Alfiee Breland-Noble.

The Power of Kindness explores how compassion and kindness can be used as tools for improving personal mental health, supporting people, and improving the sense of unity amongst different communities. In the special, Lady Gaga, Breland-Noble, and a group of young adults from across the US discuss their struggles, proud moments, and important lessons from their own mental health journeys.

== Summary ==
In “The Power of Kindness,” mental health expert, psychologist, and founder of the AAKOMA Project, Dr. Alfiee Breland-Noble and host Lady Gaga sit down with eleven young adults from across the United States to discuss how kindness relates to mental health. The short film’s discussion group includes LGBTQ youth who have been inspired by the Born This Way Foundation's work. The group explores links between mental health and three different types of kindness—kindness to ourselves, kindness to others, and kindness within our communities—sharing difficult struggles and important lessons from their own mental health journeys.

== Cast ==
- Lady Gaga
- Dr. Alfiee Breland-Noble
- Bryan Delgado
- Tyris Winter
- Diana Ambrosio
- Austin Skelton
- Angelique Ayoade
- Mary May
- Carla Ilbarra
- Ben Osborne
- Marty James Gonzalez
- Baraah Oriqat

== Release and reception ==
The documentary short The Power of Kindness was released online via Facebook Watch on Saturday, November 13, 2021, in honor of World Kindness Day, an international holiday promoting the importance of kindness and compassion introduced by the World Kindness Movement. It was shared via Lady Gaga’s Facebook and Instagram feeds and premiered on the Born This Way Foundation website the same day.

The Power of Kindness was featured in multiple major online and television news outlets, including Rolling Stone, People, Variety, New York Magazine’s Vulture, and CBS Mornings. CBS Mornings anchor Gayle King praised Gaga and the importance of the film’s focus on mental health, saying, “I love that she's doing this. How many of us have said, 'How are you?' 'Fine, fine, fine,' and you're really not fine [...] We live in a society where everything is so vitriolic and so mean. I know that she cares about this; she's committed to it."
