= List of Hillary Clinton 2016 presidential campaign celebrity endorsements =

This is a list of celebrities who publicly indicated support for Hillary Clinton in the 2016 United States presidential election.

Those who indicated their support after Hillary Clinton's presumptive nomination on June 11 are denoted with an asterisk.

== Screen and stage performers ==
=== Actors ===
- Nick Adams*
- Robert Adamson*¹
- Ben Affleck (Note: Academy Award winner)
- Dianna Agron
- Jessica Alba
- Erika Alexander
- Jason Alexander (Note: Tony Award winner)
- Joan Allen*
- Jennifer Aniston* (Note: Emmy Award winner)
- Tichina Arnold
- Patricia Arquette*
- Sean Astin
- Edoardo Ballerini*
- Elizabeth Banks
- Drew Barrymore
- Angela Bassett
- Meredith Baxter
- Beth Behrs
- Kristen Bell*
- Troian Bellisario*
- Laura Benanti*
- Candice Bergen*
- Erich Bergen*
- Mayim Bialik*
- Jessica Biel*
- Stephen Bienskie*
- Rachel Bloom*
- Emily Blunt*
- Kate Bosworth
- Julie Bowen*
- Steven Boyer*
- Zach Braff (Note: Grammy Award winner)
- Jeff Bridges*
- Connie Britton
- Matthew Broderick*
- Yvette Nicole Brown
- LeVar Burton*
- Sophia Bush
- Grace Byers*
- Trai Byers*
- Jaime Camil*
- Lizzy Caplan*
- Amy Carlson*
- Geneva Carr*
- Lynda Carter
- Kristy Cates
- Candis Cayne
- David Cerda
- Lindsay Nicole Chambers*
- Don Cheadle*
- Kristin Chenoweth*
- Ambyr Childers
- John Cho*
- Tommy Chong*
- Garrett Clayton
- George Clooney
- Glenn Close
- Michelle Clunie
- Chris Colfer
- Kevin Conroy*
- Bryan Cranston
- Gavin Creel*
- Darren Criss*
- Alan Cumming*
- Jamie Lee Curtis
- Tim Daly*
- Tyne Daly
- Matt Damon
- Ted Danson
- Hope Davis*
- Viola Davis*
- Robert De Niro
- Kat Dennings*
- Guillermo Díaz
- Leonardo DiCaprio
- Kaitlin Doubleday*
- Michael Douglas
- Robert Downey Jr.*
- Matt Doyle*
- Minnie Driver*
- Lena Dunham
- Clea Duvall*
- Aaron Eckhart
- Jesse Eisenberg
- Linda Emond*
- Kathryn Erbe*
- Cynthia Erivo*
- Max von Essen*
- Chris Evans*
- Edie Falco*
- Dakota Fanning
- Corey Feldman
- Jesse Tyler Ferguson
- America Ferrera*
- Sally Field
- Nathan Fillion*
- Fyvush Finkel*
- Anita Finlay
- Chrissie Fit*
- Barrett Foa
- Jane Fonda*
- Jamie Foxx
- James Franco*
- Morgan Freeman
- Soleil Moon Frye
- Josh Gad
- Johnny Galecki
- Jennifer Garner
- Sarah Michelle Gellar*
- Jason George
- Richard Gere
- Asmeret Ghebremichael*
- Sharon Gless
- Renée Elise Goldsberry*
- Tony Goldwyn*
- Allie Grant
- Bryshere Gray*
- Ellen Greene*
- Clark Gregg*
- Blake Cooper Griffin
- Melanie Griffith
- Diane Guerrero*
- Carla Gugino*
- Mamie Gummer
- Lukas Haas
- Mark Hamill
- Tom Hanks
- Colin Hanlon*
- David Harbour*
- Mariska Hargitay*
- Neil Patrick Harris*
- Hill Harper*
- David Hasselhoff*
- Anne Hathaway*
- Sean Hayes*
- Marg Helgenberger
- Taraji P. Henson*
- John Michael Higgins*
- Dulé Hill*
- Dustin Hoffman
- Katie Holmes*
- Bryce Dallas Howard*
- Kate Hudson
- Helen Hunt
- Dana Ivey*
- Samuel L. Jackson
- Kelley Jakle*
- Allison Janney*
- Ron Jeremy
- Scarlett Johansson*
- Ashley Johnson*
- Natalie Joy Johnson
- Cherry Jones*
- Rashida Jones*
- Rebecca Naomi Jones*
- Sarah Jones*
- Leslie Jordan*
- Anya Taylor-Joy*
- Ashley Judd
- Francis Jue*
- Andrew Keenan-Bolger*
- Celia Keenan-Bolger*
- Michael Kelly*
- Minka Kelly*
- Alicia Keys*
- Jaime King*
- Justin Kirk*
- T. R. Knight*
- Diane Kruger
- Lisa Kudrow
- Mila Kunis*
- Ashton Kutcher*
- Kathryn Layng*
- Hana Mae Lee
- John Leguizamo*
- Tom Lenk*
- Telly Leung*
- Peyton List*
- John Lithgow*
- Eva Longoria
- Tina Louise*
- Josh Lucas*
- Patti LuPone*
- Jane Lynch*
- Natasha Lyonne
- Alicia Machado
- Kyle MacLachlan*
- Tobey Maguire
- Joshua Malina*
- Julianna Margulies
- Marsha Mason*
- Andrea McArdle
- Melissa McCarthy,*
- Eric McCormack*
- Mary McCormack*
- Audra McDonald
- Matt McGorry*
- Katie McGrath
- Idina Menzel*
- Debra Messing
- Sienna Miller*
- Helen Mirren*
- Julianne Moore
- Kate Mulgrew*
- Megan Mullally*
- Jack Nicholson
- Cynthia Nixon
- Nick Nolte*
- Lupita Nyong'o*
- Rory O'Malley
- Ed O'Neill
- Leslie Odom Jr.*
- Nick Offerman*
- Ashley Olsen
- Mary-Kate Olsen
- Adam Pally*
- Hayden Panettiere
- Randall Park*
- Mary-Louise Parker*
- Jim Parsons
- Sarah Paulson
- Josh Peck
- Christine Pedi
- Sean Penn
- Simon Pegg*
- Jeff Perry
- Bernadette Peters*
- Busy Philipps
- Wendell Pierce
- Chris Pine*
- Ben Platt*
- Martha Plimpton
- Dascha Polanco
- Ellen Pompeo*
- Billy Porter*
- Natalie Portman
- Bill Pullman*
- Zachary Quinto*
- Andrew Rannells
- Nikki Reed*
- Shelley Regner
- Molly Ringwald*
- Tim Robbins*
- Emma Roberts*
- Julia Roberts*
- Holly Robinson Peete
- Tracee Ellis Ross*
- Portia de Rossi
- Mark Ruffalo*
- Katey Sagal
- Zoe Saldaña*
- Paul Scheer*
- Kristen Schaal*
- Richard Schiff*
- Taylor Schilling*
- Adam Scott
- Kyra Sedgwick
- Amy Seimetz*
- Martin Sheen*
- Cybill Shepherd
- Armin Shimerman*
- Kate Shindle*
- Gabourey Sidibe*
- Molly Sims
- Marina Sirtis*
- Tasha Smith*
- Jussie Smollett*
- Cobie Smulders*
- Marilyn Sokol*
- Ian Somerhalder
- Kevin Spacey*
- Octavia Spencer
- Mary Steenburgen
- Fisher Stevens
- Julia Stiles*
- Emma Stone*
- Sharon Stone*
- Meryl Streep*
- Trudie Styler
- George Takei*
- Amber Tamblyn
- Charlize Theron
- Heather Thomas*
- Marlo Thomas
- Sean Patrick Thomas*
- Lily Tomlin
- John Travolta
- Stanley Tucci*
- Kathleen Turner
- Sophie Turner*
- Aisha Tyler*
- Wilmer Valderrama
- Amber Valletta
- Christopher Walken
- Kate Walsh*
- Adrienne Warren*
- Tuc Watkins*
- Denzel Washington*
- Kerry Washington*
- Emma Watson*
- Sigourney Weaver*
- Forest Whitaker
- Bradley Whitford
- Olivia Wilde
- Jesse Williams*
- Rita Wilson
- Marissa Jaret Winokur*
- Reese Witherspoon
- Shannon Woodward
- Jeffrey Wright,
- Bellamy Young

=== Comics and comedians ===
- Cristela Alonzo
- Aziz Ansari*
- Maria Bamford
- Samantha Bee*
- Kate Berlant*
- Mike Birbiglia
- Michael Ian Black
- River Butcher*
- Louis C.K.
- Dave Chappelle*
- Kate Clinton
- Billy Crystal*
- Jane Curtin*
- Rob Delaney*
- Lea DeLaria
- Rachel Dratch*
- Nora Dunn
- Cameron Esposito
- Will Ferrell
- Jena Friedman
- Ana Gasteyer
- Ilana Glazer
- Bobcat Goldthwait*
- Kathy Griffin
- Chelsea Handler
- Steve Harvey
- Abbi Jacobson
- Penn Jillette*
- Keegan-Michael Key*
- Taran Killam*
- Robert Klein*
- Natasha Leggero
- Seth MacFarlane*
- Bill Maher*
- Tim Meadows
- Seth Meyers*
- Fawzia Mirza
- Sue Murphy
- Aparna Nancherla*
- Kathy Najimy
- Trevor Noah*
- Tig Notaro
- Rosie O'Donnell
- Aubrey Plaza
- Amy Poehler
- Retta
- Chris Rock
- Amy Schumer
- Sarah Silverman*
- Wanda Sykes
- Sheryl Underwood*
- Suzanne Westenhoefer
- Jessica Williams*

== Sports figures and athletes ==
- Abby Wambach
- Adam Silver, 5th NBA Commissioner
- Alex Rodriguez
- Alshon Jeffery
- Ben Olsen
- Billie Jean King (Note: Hall of Fame inductee)
- Billy King, former GM: Brooklyn Nets
- Calvin Pryor*
- Carl Lewis
- Cato June
- Chamique Holdsclaw
- Chauncey Billups*
- Dale Scott*
- David Morehouse, President: Pittsburgh Penguins
- David Stern, 4th NBA Commissioner (1984–2014)
- DeMarcus Ware
- Dikembe Mutombo*
- Doug Williams
- Franco Harris
- Georgina Bloomberg
- Grant Hill
- Greg Louganis
- Hank Aaron
- Hope Solo
- Jarron Collins
- Jason Collins
- Jason Kidd
- Jay Williams
- Jeffrey Lurie, owner: Philadelphia Eagles
- Jerome Felton
- Jerry Crawford, founder: Iowa Energy
- Jim Brown
- Joel Bitonio
- John Greco
- John McEnroe*
- Jonas Gray
- Kareem Abdul-Jabbar
- Laila Ali
- Larry Lucchino, former CEO: Boston Red Sox
- LeBron James*
- Lin Dunn
- Magic Johnson
- Martin Mayhew,* former GM: Detroit Lions
- Megan Rapinoe*
- Michelle Kwan
- Mike D'Antoni,* head coach: Houston Rockets
- Mike Tomlin
- Peter Angelos, Owner: Baltimore Orioles
- Ray Mancini
- Rolando Blackman
- Rory Babich, CEO: Florida Panthers
- Sam Kennedy, President: Boston Red Sox
- Sammy Sosa*
- Stephen Curry*
- Theo Epstein,* President: Chicago Cubs
- Tom Werner, Chairman: Boston Red Sox
- Tony Gonzalez
- Troy Smith

== Media personalities and socialites ==
Internet personalities

- GloZell
- Gigi Gorgeous
- Grace Helbig
- Trisha Hershberger
- Casey Neistat*
- Randy Rainbow*
- Sam Tsui*

Models

- Air Force Amy
- Christie Brinkley
- Jessica Drake
- Kendall Jenner
- Heidi Klum
- Amber Rose
- Chrissy Teigen
- Christy Turlington

Radio personalities

- Andy Cohen
- Mark Daley*
- Garrison Keillor
- Angie Martinez
- Howard Stern

Television personalities

- Tyra Banks*
- Lo Bosworth
- Raúl De Molina
- Bianca Del Rio
- Bethenny Frankel
- Brittny Gastineau*
- Tim Gunn
- Gia Gunn
- Kris Jenner
- Star Jones
- Khloé Kardashian
- Kim Kardashian
- Padma Lakshmi
- LuAnn de Lesseps
- Sharon Osbourne
- Melissa Rivers
- RuPaul
- Naomi Smalls
- Jerry Springer
- Rick Steves
- André Leon Talley
- Montel Williams*
- Oprah Winfrey,* Member of the Forbes 400

== Voice artists and musicians ==
Bands, duos, and musical groups

- Disappear Fear
- Eric B. & Rakim*
- Gente de Zona*
- A Great Big World
- Macklemore & Ryan Lewis*
- The National*
- Third Eye Blind*
- Le Tigre*
- Los Tigres del Norte*

DJs and instrumentalists

- Jeff Ament* (Pearl Jam)
- DJ Cassidy
- DJ Khaled*
- Jon Fishman* (Phish)
- Stone Gossard* (Pearl Jam)
- Ben Harper
- Quincy Jones
- Kerry King* (Slayer)
- Moby
- Samantha Ronson
- Carlos Santana
- Lars Ulrich (Metallica)

Rappers

- 50 Cent
- ASAP Rocky
- Big Sean*
- Chance the Rapper
- Common
- Freeway*
- Ghostface Killah (Wu-Tang Clan)
- Ice-T
- Ja Rule
- Jay-Z*
- Kodak Black*
- RZA (Wu-Tang Clan)
- Bobby Shmurda
- Snoop Dogg
- Waka Flocka Flame
- will.i.am
- Yo Gotti*
- Young Jeezy

Singer-songwriters and vocalists

- Yolanda Adams
- Adele*
- Christina Aguilera
- Marc Anthony
- Billie Joe Armstrong* (Green Day)
- Babyface
- Burt Bacharach
- Lance Bass* (NSYNC)
- Jon Bauman (Sha Na Na)
- Harry Belafonte*
- Matt Bellamy (Muse)
- Tony Bennett
- Beyoncé
- Mary J. Blige
- Michael Bolton
- Jon Bon Jovi
- Haley Bonar*
- Jimmy Buffett*
- Win Butler* (Arcade Fire)
- Jencarlos Canela*
- Mariah Carey
- Cher
- Kelly Clarkson
- George Clinton*
- Luis Coronel
- Miley Cyrus*
- Andra Day
- Ester Dean
- Ed Droste* (Grizzly Bear)
- Estelle
- Don Everly (The Everly Brothers)
- Perry Farrell (Jane's Addiction)
- Vicente Fernández*
- Renée Fleming
- Ellie Goulding
- Ariana Grande
- Barney Greenway
- Josh Groban*
- Todrick Hall*
- Faith Hill
- Janet Jackson
- Morgan James
- Joan Jett*
- Elton John
- JoJo
- Tori Kelly
- Alicia Keys*
- Carole King
- Ben Kweller
- Lady Gaga
- Cyndi Lauper
- John Legend
- Jennifer Lopez
- Demi Lovato
- Courtney Love
- Toby Love
- Jessica Lowndes
- Madonna*
- Ricky Martin
- Paul McCartney* (The Beatles)
- Tim McGraw
- Bonnie McKee
- Jeremy Messersmith*
- Christina Milian
- K. Michelle
- Janelle Monáe
- Monica
- Mandy Moore
- Ne-Yo
- Stevie Nicks
- Jessye Norman
- Dottie Peoples
- Katy Perry
- Linda Perry (4 Non Blondes)
- Rachel Platten*
- Kelly Price
- Trent Reznor* (Nine Inch Nails)
- Lionel Richie
- Rihanna*
- Bruce Roberts
- Mark Ronson*
- Axl Rose
- Prince Royce*
- Paulina Rubio*
- Carole Bayer Sager
- Jessica Sanchez
- Sia
- Carly Simon*
- Dee Snider
- Britney Spears
- Bruce Springsteen*
- Shayna Steele*
- Sting
- Barbra Streisand
- Geoff Tate
- Corey Taylor
- James Taylor
- Justin Timberlake*
- Mike Tompkins
- Usher
- Eddie Vedder* (Pearl Jam)
- Pharrell Williams
- Kelly Willis
- Charlie Wilson (The Gap Band)
- Mary Wilson (The Supremes)
- Stevie Wonder
- Peter Yarrow*

== See also ==
- List of Democrats who opposed the Hillary Clinton 2016 presidential campaign
- List of Hillary Clinton 2016 presidential campaign political endorsements
- List of Bernie Sanders 2016 presidential campaign endorsements
- List of Donald Trump 2016 presidential campaign endorsements
- List of Gary Johnson 2016 presidential campaign endorsements
- List of Hillary Clinton 2008 presidential campaign endorsements
- List of Jill Stein 2016 presidential campaign endorsements
- List of Republicans who opposed the Donald Trump 2016 presidential campaign
