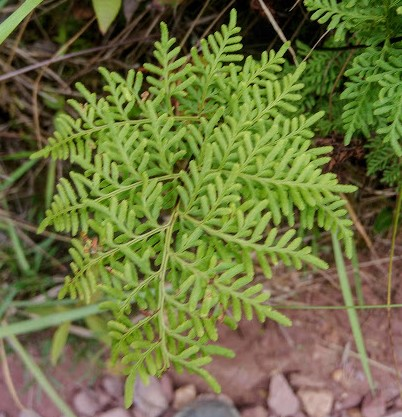
- Gaga marginata

Scientific classification
- Kingdom: Plantae
- Clade: Tracheophytes
- Division: Polypodiophyta
- Class: Polypodiopsida
- Order: Polypodiales
- Family: Pteridaceae
- Subfamily: Cheilanthoideae
- Genus: Gaga; Pryer, Fay W.Li & Windham

Type species
- Gaga marginata (Kunth) Fay W.Li & Windham

Species
- See text

= Gaga (plant) =

Genus of ferns

Gaga (gaga lipfern) is a genus of 19 species of ferns in the family Pteridaceae named after American singer and songwriter Lady Gaga. Two of the 19 species are newly-described: Gaga germanotta from Costa Rica, named after the family of the singer (she was born Stefani Germanotta), and Gaga monstraparva, in honor of Gaga's fans, whom she calls "little monsters". According to biologists, the ferns bear a close resemblance to Gaga's costume from the 52nd Annual Grammy Awards and also bear a distinct DNA sequence spelling GAGA.

Except for the two new species, the rest of the Gaga ferns were reclassified, having previously been assigned to the genus Cheilanthes, based on their outward appearance. Biologists at Duke University explained that they listed the ferns with the name Gaga, due to the singer's active support of equality and individual expression. The decision received widespread attention from the science community and the media.

== Description ==
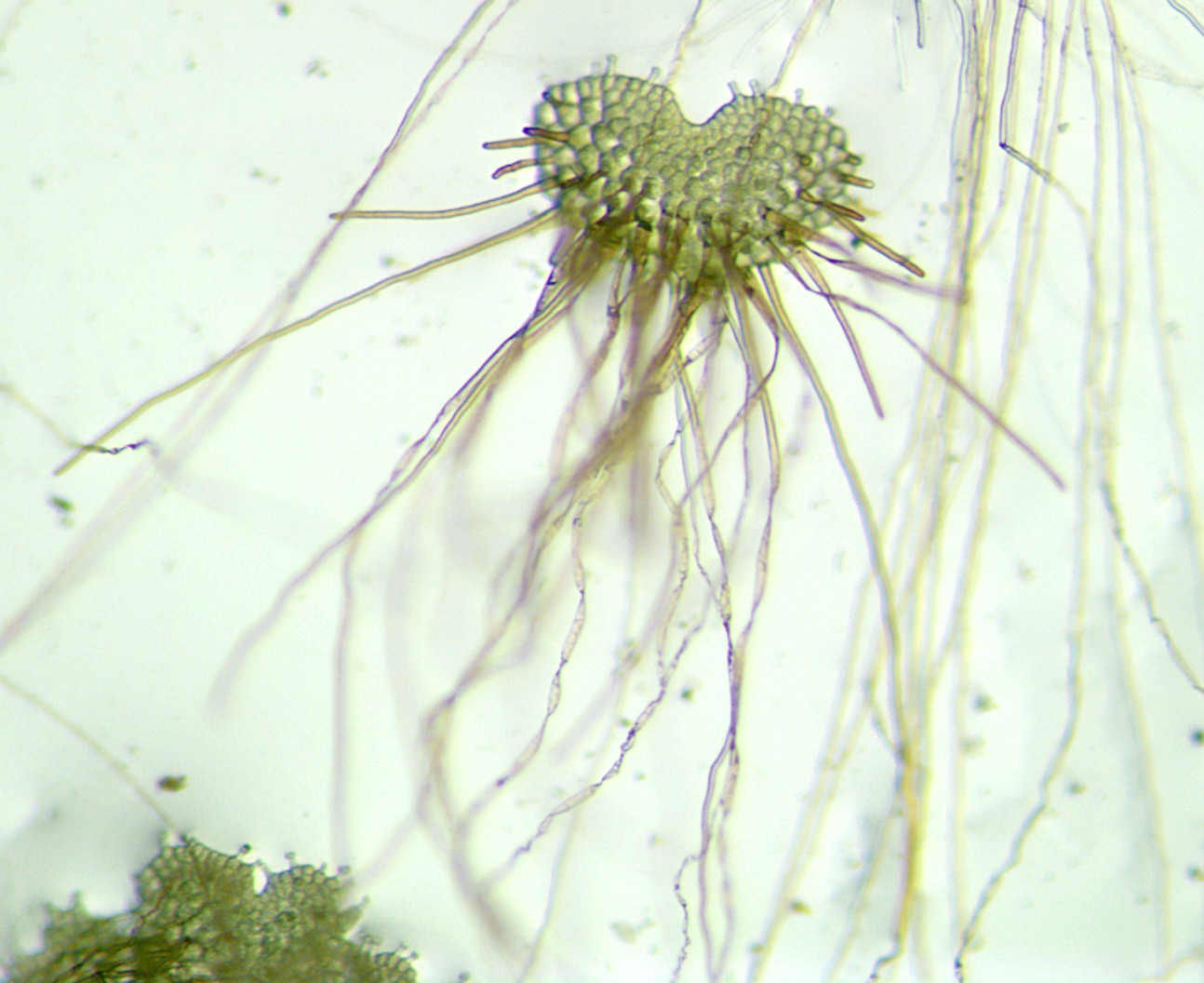
A gametophyte, with its characteristic heart-shaped structure, which was deemed similar to Gaga's wardrobe during her performance at the 2010 Grammy Awards

Pryer published her findings in the then-current issue of Systematic Botany, the quarterly publication of the American Society of Plant Taxonomists, after a five-year study of the ferns. The 17 species were re-classified once Li was able to confirm by DNA sequencing of around 80 samples, that they were distinct in appearance and would be better categorized under a new genus. Pryer used new scientific tools for reorganization of the fern family tree. She also explained that the biology of the Gaga ferns are "exceptionally obscure" and unattainable due to the sexual crossing between the species. This was attained by their high content of chromosomes and asexuality, which resulted in the child ferns being genetically identical to the parent ones, and thus indiscernible.

The genus is described as the early offshoot of hemionitid ferns, and is most closely related to genus Aspidotis. Following the characteristics of most ferns, the Gaga group is homosporous in nature, and produce minute spherical spores that travel and fall down on the ground. They later germinate into heart-shaped gametophytes. The thesis on the species explained that "These independent little organisms can be female, male or even bisexual, depending on growth conditions and what other kinds of gametophytes are around. When conditions are right, they exchange sperm between gametophytes, but when necessary they sometimes can also self-fertilize to produce a new fern."

== Background and naming ==
"We study, in particular, a group of ferns called the cheilanthoid ferns, there are about 500 or 600 of them, and many of them tend to be more adapted to living in desert situations, which is unusual for ferns... We've been doing a lot of molecular sequencing, looking at a lot of plant material, doing a lot of field work, so we're now at the point where we're concluding some of the work, and we have enough evidence to be able to look at all the data and say, 'Hmmm, there's this group here that is really in the wrong genus... We need to give it a new name'."

— Kathleen Pryer talking to MTV about her research.

In September 2012, scientists at Chulalongkorn University had given Lady Gaga's name to a species of newly identified parasitic wasp, Aleiodes gaga. A month later, researchers at Duke University in North Carolina discovered two new species of fern in Central and South America, Mexico, Arizona, and Texas. They were named Gaga germanotta, after the singer's family—she was born Stefani Germanotta—and Gaga monstraparva, after a name for Gaga's fans, known as "little monsters". The ferns were discovered in Costa Rica and Mexico primarily. Another 17 species of ferns had been assigned to the genus Cheilanthes, but were reclassified under Gaga, making a total of 19 species in the genus.

According to Kathleen Pryer, president of the American Fern Society, American Society of Plant Taxonomists and study leader of the research group, they often "listen[ed] to [Gaga's] music while we do our research... We think that her second album, Born This Way (2011), is enormously empowering, especially for disenfranchised people and communities like LGBT, ethnic groups, women—and scientists who study odd ferns!" As the team started considering a name for the ferns, they noticed that one of them had the base pair sequence "G–A–G–A" (guanine, adenine, guanine, adenine) in its DNA. This was noticed by one of the graduate students, Fay-Wei Li, who had scanned the base pairs and found the sequence. The ferns had the ability to self-fertilize and had "fluid definitions of gender". This gave the scientists concrete reason for naming the species as Gaga.

The second inspiration came from Gaga's performance of "Poker Face" at the 52nd Annual Grammy Awards in 2010. While singing, she had worn an Armani Prive' costume, which was shaped like a heart. It was accompanied by huge shoulder pads, which gave it an appearance of the bisexual reproductive stage of the ferns, called a gametophyte. The dress also had the characteristic color of light green. Pryer noticed that the new leaves of the ferns were shaped like the characteristic "paws up" salute displayed by Gaga to her fans.

== Species ==
As of July 2026, the Checklist of Ferns and Lycophytes of the World recognized the following nineteen species:

- Gaga angustifolia (Kunth) Fay W.Li & Windham
- Gaga apiacea (Mickel) Fay W.Li & Windham
- Gaga arizonica (Maxon) Fay W.Li & Windham
- Gaga chaerophylla (M.Martens & Galeotti) Fay W.Li & Windham
- Gaga complanata (A.R.Sm.) Fay W.Li & Windham
- Gaga cuneata (Link) Fay W.Li & Windham
- Gaga decomposita (M.Martens & Galeotti) Fay W.Li & Windham
- Gaga decurrens (Mickel) Fay W.Li & Windham
- Gaga germanotta Fay W.Li & Windham
- Gaga harrisii (Maxon) Fay W.Li & Windham
- Gaga hintoniorum (Mendenh. & G.L.Nesom) Fay W.Li & Windham
- Gaga hirsuta (Link) Fay W.Li & Windham
- Gaga kaulfussii (Kunze) Fay W.Li & Windham
- Gaga lerstenii (Mickel & Beitel) Fay W.Li & Windham
- Gaga marginata (Kunth) Fay W.Li & Windham
- Gaga membranacea (Davenp.) Fay W.Li & Windham
- Gaga monstraparva Fay W.Li & Windham
- Gaga pellaeopsis (Mickel) Fay W.Li & Windham
- Gaga purpusii (T.Reeves) Fay W.Li & Windham

== Distribution ==
The species are found from Arizona and Texas in the United States south through Central America and into South America as far as southern Bolivia. The greatest diversity is in Mexico, where 17 of the 19 species occur, and 6 are endemic.

== Media reception ==
The naming of the fern after the singer received widespread attention from the science community and the media. Duke University scholar and professor Cathy Davidson, who had been previously associated with the inception of Gaga's Born This Way Foundation, said that it was a "remarkable, unexpected, perfect tribute to name a genus of ferns for Lady Gaga". Amy Briggs from National Geographic added that along with her "dance tunes and memorable meaty fashion choices, [Gaga] has another claim to fame: botany." Sean Michaels from The Guardian remarked that "by honoring Gaga in this way, the academics have doubtless paved the way for a series of fern-based costumes". David Itzkoff from The New York Times declared about the naming, "scientists may seem like a pretty poker-faced bunch, but the botanists at Duke University, at least, have a sense of humor about their work and some pop-culture savvy to go with it". James Montgomery from MTV News noted that Gaga is characterized as a "global superstar, fashion icon, entrepreneur and role model to millions, yet despite all that, her impact on the world of pteridophytes has been minimal at best—until now, that is [with the naming]." Colin Schultz from Smithsonian felt that since scientists are also normal people with interests, hobbies, and musical inclinations, "so, sometimes, when a new species of plant or animal is discovered, it gets named after something cool." Gaga herself responded positively to the naming, saying that "since it's an asexual fern, there are 19 species contained within the genus. All sexless, judgeless. How I wish to be."

== See also ==
- List of organisms named after famous people (born 1975–present)
