= Primetime Emmy Award for Outstanding Music Direction =

- Awarded for: Outstanding Music Direction
- Country: United States
- Presented by: Academy of Television Arts & Sciences
- Currently held by: The Apple Music Super Bowl LX Halftime Show Starring Bad Bunny (2026)
- Website: emmys.com

The Primetime Emmy Award for Outstanding Music Direction is awarded to one television series or special each year.

In the following list, the first titles listed in gold are the winners; those not in gold are nominees, which are listed in alphabetical order. The years given are those in which the ceremonies took place.

== Winners and nominations ==
indicates the winner

=== 1970s ===
Year	Program	Episode	Nominees	Network
1970
1970	Kraft Music Hall	"The Sound of Burt Bacharach"	Peter Matz	NBC
1970	The Merv Griffin Show	"Chuck Connors, Joey Heatherton, Buddy Greco and Jack E. Leonard"	Mort Lindsey	CBS
1970	This Is Tom Jones	"Mary Hopkins, Shelley Berman and José Feliciano"	Johnnie Spence	ABC
1971
1971	Swing Out, Sweet Land		Dominic Frontiere	NBC
1971	Hamlet		John Addison	NBC
1971	The Merv Griffin Show	"Big Band Salute"	Mort Lindsey	CBS
1972
1972	Jack Lemmon in 'S Wonderful, 'S Marvelous, 'S Gershwin		Elliot Lawrence	CBS
1972	The Golddiggers Chevrolet Show	"Fess Parker"	Van Alexander	Syndicated
1972	The Sonny & Cher Comedy Hour	"Jean Stapleton and Mike Connors"	James E. Dale	CBS
1973
1973	The Carol Burnett Show	"Anthony Newley and Bernadette Peters"	Peter Matz	CBS
1973	Dr. Jekyll and Mr. Hyde		Irwin Kostal	NBC
1973	The Wacky World of Jonathan Winters	"Debbie Reynolds"	Van Alexander	Syndicated
1974
1974	Barbra Streisand...and Other Musical Instruments		Jack Parnell, Mitzie Welch and Ken Welch	CBS
1974	The Carol Burnett Show	"The Australia Show"	Peter Matz	CBS
1974	The Sonny & Cher Comedy Hour	"The Sonny and Cher Years"	Marty Paich	CBS
1976
1976	Evening at Symphony	"Central Park in the Dark/A Hero's Life"	Seiji Ozawa	PBS
1976	Gypsy in My Soul		Cy Coleman and Donn Trenner	CBS
1977
1977	America Salutes Richard Rodgers: The Sound of His Music		Ian Fraser	CBS
1977	Bronk	"The Vigilante"	Jacques Urbont	CBS
1977	The New York Philharmonic: Rafael Kubelik (Live from Lincoln Center)		Rafael Kubelík	PBS
1977	Previn and the Pittsburgh	"Mozart as Keyboard Prodigy"	André Previn	PBS
1977	Sills and Burnett at the Met		Peter Matz	CBS
1978
1978	The Sentry Collection Presents Ben Vereen: His Roots		Ian Fraser	ABC
1978	The New York Philharmonic with Zubin Mehta and Shirley Verrett (Live from Lincoln Center)		Zubin Mehta	PBS
1978	Previn and the Pittsburgh	"The Music That Made the Movies"	André Previn	PBS
1978	The Second Barry Manilow Special		Jimmie Haskell	ABC

=== 1980s ===
Year	Program	Episode	Nominees	Network
1980
1980	Baryshnikov on Broadway		Ian Fraser	ABC
1980	Barry Manilow: One Voice		Artie Butler	ABC
1980	The Big Show	"Steve Lawrence and Don Rickles"	Nick Perito, Joe Lipman, Angela Morley and Peter Myers	NBC
1981	Outstanding Music Direction			
1981	Linda in Wonderland		Ian Fraser, Chris Boardman, Billy Byers and Bob Florence	CBS
1981	The Magic of David Copperfield III		Sid Feller, Norman Mamey and George Wyle	CBS
1981	Omnibus	"Aretha Franklin, Princess Grace of Monaco and John Ritter"	Alf Clausen, Jack Elliott and William Goldstein	ABC
1981	Perry Como's Christmas in the Holy Land		Nick Perito	ABC
1981	Stand by Your Man		Carl Brandt, Deane Hagen and Earle Hagen	CBS
1981	Outstanding Individual Achievement - Special Class (Note: As a juried award, nominees had to garner 50% approval to win the award. The nominees did not meet the benchmark and no award was given.)			
1981	The Kennedy Center Honors: A National Celebration		Alan Barker, Zubin Mehta, Nick Perito and Michael Tilson Thomas	CBS
1982
1982	Night of 100 Stars		Bill Elton, Elliot Lawrence, Lanny Meyers, Tommy Newsom, Jonathan Tunick and Torrie Zito	ABC
1982	Ain't Misbehavin'		Luther Henderson	NBC
1982	The American Movie Awards		Allyn Ferguson	NBC
1982	Shirley MacLaine... Illusions		Peter Matz	CBS
1982	Walt Disney: One Man's Dream		Ian Fraser, Chris Boardman and Billy Byers	CBS
1983
1983	Eubie Blake: A Century of Music (Kennedy Center Tonight)		Dick Hyman	PBS
1983	Epcot Center: The Opening Celebration		Ian Fraser, Chris Boardman and Billy Byers	CBS
1983	Ellington: The Music Live (Great Performances)		Mercer Ellington	PBS
1983	Perry Como's Christmas in Paris		Jon Charles and Nick Perito	ABC
1983	Sheena Easton... Act One		Peter Matz	NBC
1984
1984	The Screen Actors Guild 50th Anniversary Celebration		Ian Fraser, Chris Boardman, Billy Byers, J. Hill and Lenny Stack	CBS
1984	Marilyn Horne's Great American Songbook (Live from Lincoln Center)		William D. Brohn, Paul Chihara, Jack Gale, Glenn Osser, Leonard Slatkin and Jonathan Tunick	PBS
1984	The Magic of David Copperfield VI		Mauro Bruno and George Wyle	CBS
1984	Perry Como's Christmas in New York		Nick Perito	ABC
1984	The Stars Salute the U.S. Olympic Team		Ray Charles and Jon Charles	NBC
1985
1985	Christmas in Washington		Ian Fraser, Billy Byers and Angela Morley	NBC
1985	Disneyland's 30th Anniversary Celebration		Tony Fox, J. Hill, John Rodby and Lenny Stack	NBC
1985	Night of 100 Stars II		Bill Elton, Lawrence James, Elliot Lawrence, Lanny Meyers, Tommy Newsom, Glen Roven and Torrie Zito	ABC
1985	Perry Como's Christmas in England		Nick Perito	ABC
1986
1986	The 1986 Tony Awards		Elliot Lawrence, James Lawrence, Lanny Meyers, Tommy Newsom, Glen Roven, Larry Schwartz and Torrie Zito	CBS
1986	Andy Williams and the NBC Kids Search for Santa		Ian Fraser, Chris Boardman, J. Hill and Lenny Stack	NBC
1986	The Kennedy Center Honors		Bob Alberti, Jon Charles, Allyn Ferguson, Peter Matz and Nick Perito	CBS
1986	Kraft Salutes George Burns' 90th Birthday		Peter Matz	CBS
1987
1987	Broadway Sings: The Music of Jule Styne (Great Performances)		Buster Davis, Don Pippin and Eric Stern	PBS
1987	A Carol Burnett Special... Carol, Carl, Whoopi & Robin		Peter Matz	ABC
1987	Liberty Weekend: Opening Ceremonies		Ian Fraser, Chris Boardman, Ralph Burns, Alexander Courage, J. Hill and Angela Morley	ABC
1987	The Perry Como Christmas Special		Nick Perito	ABC
1987	The 1987 Tony Awards		Larry Grossman, Wally Harper, Elliot Lawrence, James Lawrence, Lanny Meyers and Torrie Zito	CBS
1988
1988	Julie Andrews: The Sound of Christmas		Ian Fraser, Chris Boardman, Alexander Courage and Angela Morley	ABC
1988	Celebrating Gershwin (Great Performances)		Michael Tilson Thomas	PBS
1988	Irving Berlin's 100th Birthday Celebration		Larry Grossman, Mark Hummel, Elliot Lawrence, James Lawrence, Peter Matz, Lanny Meyers, Tommy Newsom, Larry Schwartz, Don Sebesky and Torrie Zito	CBS
1988	Moonlighting	"Cool Hand Dave, Part 2"	Alf Clausen, Brad Dechter, George Gaffney, Hummie Mann and Don Nemitz	ABC
1989	Outstanding Music Direction			
1989	Christmas in Washington		Ian Fraser, Chris Boardman and J. Hill	NBC
1989	Late Night with David Letterman	"7th Anniversary Special"	Paul Shaffer, Bruce Kapler	NBC
1989	Michelob Presents Saturday Night		Marcus Miller	Syndicated
1989	Moonlighting	"A Womb with a View"	Alf Clausen, Brad Dechter, George Gaffney, Hummie Mann and D'Vaughn Pershing	ABC
1989	The Smothers Brothers Comedy Hour	"Kenny Rogers, Maureen McGovern and Geoffrey Lewis"	Jack Elliott	CBS
1989	Outstanding Music for Special Events (Note: As a juried award, nominees had to garner 50% approval to win the award. The nominees did not meet the benchmark and no award was given.)			
1989	The 11th Annual Kennedy Center Honors: A Celebration of the Performing Arts		Bob Alberti, Jon Charles, Ray Charles, Mark Hummel, Dick Lieb and Nick Perito	CBS

=== 1990s ===
Year	Program	Episode	Nominees	Network
1990
1990	Julie Andrews in Concert (Great Performances)		Ian Fraser, Billy Byers, Chris Boardman, Bob Florence, J. Hill and Angela Morley	PBS
1990	The 63rd Annual Academy Awards		Bill Conti, Jack Eskew, Julie Giroux, Ashley Irwin, William Kidd, Morton Stevens, Peter Matz and Billy Byers	ABC
1990	The Kennedy Center Honors		Nick Perito, Ray Charles and Jon Charles	CBS
1990	Sammy Davis Jr. 60th Anniversary Celebration		Glen Roven, David Michael Frank, Bruce Miller, Joe Curiale and Lawrence Schwartz	ABC
1990	The Songwriters Hall of Fame 20th Anniversary... The Magic of Music		Elliot Lawrence, Jack Cornter, Marvin Laird, Jamie Lawrence, Peter Matz, Lanny Meyers, James 'Buddy' Skipper and Torrie Zito	CBS
1991
1991	The Walt Disney Company Presents the American Teacher Awards		Ian Fraser, Billy Byers, Chris Boardman and J. Hill	Disney
1991	The 63rd Annual Academy Awards		Bill Conti, Jack Eskew, Julie Giroux, Ashley Irwin, Dennis McCarthy and Marc Shaiman	ABC
1991	The Josephine Baker Story		Ralph Burns	HBO
1991	The Muppets Celebrate Jim Henson		Larry Grossman, Paul McKibbons, Torrie Zito and Jamie Lawrence	CBS
1991	The 1990 Tony Awards		Elliot Lawrence, Lanny Meyers, Torrie Zito and Jamie Lawrence	CBS
1992
1992	The 64th Annual Academy Awards		Bill Conti, Jack Eskew, Julie Giroux, Ashley Irwin and Hummie Mann	ABC
1992	Christmas in Washington		Ian Fraser, Chris Boardman, Billy Byers and J. Hill	NBC
1992	The Kennedy Center Honors		Nick Perito and Ray Charles	CBS
1992	Late Night with David Letterman	"10th Anniversary Special"	Paul Shaffer and Bruce Kapler	NBC
1993
1993	The 52nd Presidential Inaugural Gala		Ian Fraser	CBS
1993	The 65th Annual Academy Awards		Bill Conti	ABC
1993	The Kennedy Center Honors		Nick Perito	CBS
1993	Sinatra	"Part 1"	Artie Butler	CBS
1993	The Young Indiana Jones Chronicles	"Young Indiana Jones and the Mystery of the Blues"	Joel McNeely	ABC
1994
1994	Gypsy		Michael Rafter	CBS
1994	The 66th Annual Academy Awards		Bill Conti	ABC
1994	Jerry Herman's Broadway at the Bowl (Great Performances)		Donald Pippin	PBS
1994	The Kennedy Center Honors		Elliot Lawrence	CBS
1994	The Walt Disney Company Presents the American Teacher Awards		Ian Fraser	Disney
1995
1995	Barbra Streisand: The Concert		Marvin Hamlisch	HBO
1995	The 67th Annual Academy Awards		Bill Conti	ABC
1995	The Kennedy Center Honors		Elliot Lawrence	CBS
1995	The 38th Pablo Casals Festival		Krzysztof Penderecki	A&E
1995	The Walt Disney Company Presents the American Teacher Awards		Ian Fraser	Disney
1996
1996	Sinatra: 80 Years My Way		Glen Roven	ABC
1996	Bye Bye Birdie		Irwin Fisch	ABC
1996	Christmas in Washington		Ian Fraser	NBC
1996	The 39th Pablo Casals Festival		Krzysztof Penderecki	A&E
1996	Peter and the Wolf		George Daugherty	ABC
1997
1997	Centennial Olympic Games: Opening Ceremonies		Mark Watters	NBC
1997	The 69th Annual Academy Awards		Bill Conti	ABC
1997	Bette Midler: Diva Las Vegas		Bobby Lyle	HBO
1997	The 53rd Presidential Inaugural Gala: An American Journey		Ian Fraser	CBS
1997	The Simpsons	"Simpsoncalifragilisticexpiala(Annoyed Grunt)cious"	Alf Clausen	Fox
1998
1998	The 70th Annual Academy Awards		Bill Conti	ABC
1998	Michael Crawford in Concert		Ian Fraser	PBS
1998	Rodgers & Hammerstein's Cinderella		Paul Bogaev	ABC
1998	The Simpsons	"All Singing, All Dancing"	Alf Clausen	Fox
1998	Star Trek: Deep Space Nine	"His Way"	Jay Chattaway	Syndicated
1999
1999	The Rat Pack		Mark Adler	HBO
1999	The 71st Annual Academy Awards		Bill Conti	ABC
1999	And the Beat Goes On: The Sonny and Cher Story		Steve Tyrell	ABC
1999	Christmas in Washington		Ian Fraser	TNT
1999	Janet: The Velvet Rope		Rex Salas	HBO
1999	The Temptations	"Part 1"	Daniel Carlin	NBC

=== 2000s ===
Year	Program	Episode	Nominees	Network
2000
2000	Annie		Paul Bogaev	ABC
2000	E-Trade Super Bowl XXXIV Halftime Show		Dan Stamper	ABC
2000	Heroes for the Planet Featuring Special Guest Charlotte Church		Michael Andreas	A&E
2000	The Kennedy Center Honors		Elliot Lawrence	CBS
2000	The Little Richard Story		David Sibley	NBC
2001
2001	Barbra Streisand: Timeless		Marvin Hamlisch	Fox
2001	Christmas in Washington		Ian Fraser	TNT
2001	The Kennedy Center Honors		Elliot Lawrence	CBS
2001	My Favorite Broadway: The Love Songs (Great Performances)		Paul Gemignani	PBS
2001	Rodgers & Hammerstein's South Pacific		Paul Bogaev	ABC
2002
2002	Opening Ceremony Salt Lake 2002 Olympic Winter Games		Mark Watters	NBC
2002	The 74th Annual Academy Awards		John Williams	ABC
2002	Buffy the Vampire Slayer	"Once More, with Feeling"	Christophe Beck and Jesse Tobias	UPN
2002	Christmas in Washington		Ian Fraser	TNT
2002	The Kennedy Center Honors		Elliot Lawrence	CBS
2002	Ultimate Manilow!		Steve Welch	CBS
2003
2003	The 75th Annual Academy Awards		Bill Conti	ABC
2003	Cher: The Farewell Tour		Paul Mirkovich	NBC
2003	Christmas in Washington		Ian Fraser	TNT
2003	Meredith Willson's The Music Man		Michael Kosarin	ABC
2004
2004	Harry Connick Jr.: "Only You" in Concert (Great Performances)		Harry Connick Jr.	PBS
2004	The 76th Annual Academy Awards		Marc Shaiman and Harold Wheeler	ABC
2004	Christmas in Washington		Ian Fraser	TNT
2004	The Kennedy Center Honors		Elliot Lawrence	CBS
2005
2005	A Christmas Carol		Michael Kosarin	NBC
2005	Broadway: The American Musical	"Oh, What a Beautiful Morning"	Matthias Gohl	PBS
2005	Christmas in Washington		Ian Fraser	TNT
2005	Genius: A Night for Ray Charles		Rickey Minor	CBS
2005	The Little Prince (Great Performances)		Rachel Portman	PBS
2006
2006	South Pacific in Concert from Carnegie Hall (Great Performances)		Paul Gemignani	PBS
2006	78th Annual Academy Awards		Bill Conti	ABC
2006	Andrea Bocelli: Amore Under the Desert Sky (Great Performances)		David Foster	PBS
2006	The Kennedy Center Honors		Elliot Lawrence and Rob Mathes	CBS
2006	The 59th Annual Tony Awards		Elliot Lawrence	CBS
2007
2007	The 79th Annual Academy Awards		William Ross	ABC
2007	Dancing with the Stars	"310"	Harold Wheeler	ABC
2007	Scrubs	"My Musical"	Jan Stevens	NBC
2007	The 60th Annual Tony Awards		Elliot Lawrence	CBS
2008
2008	Movies Rock		Steve Jordan and Mark Watters	CBS
2008	The 80th Annual Academy Awards		Bill Conti	ABC
2008	Barry Manilow: Songs from the Seventies		Ron Walters Jr.	PBS
2008	Christmas in Washington		Ian Fraser	TNT
2008	The 50th Annual Grammy Awards		Rickey Minor	CBS
2009
2009	Streisand: The Concert		William Ross	NBC
2009	Christmas in Washington		Ian Fraser	TNT
2009	Dancing with the Stars	"710A"	Harold Wheeler	ABC
2009	The 51st Annual Grammy Awards		Rickey Minor	CBS
2009	The Kennedy Center Honors		Rob Berman and Rob Mathes	CBS

=== 2010s ===
Year	Program	Episode	Nominees	Network
2010
2010	Vancouver 2010 Olympic Winter Games Opening Ceremony		Dave Pierce	NBC
2010	The 82nd Annual Academy Awards		Marc Shaiman	ABC
2010	Andrea Bocelli & David Foster: My Christmas (Great Performances)		David Foster	PBS
2010	Celtic Woman: Songs from the Heart		David Downes	PBS
2010	Fiesta Latina: In Performance at the White House		Sheila E.	PBS
2010	The Kennedy Center Honors		Rob Berman and Rob Mathes	CBS
2011
2011	Harry Connick Jr.: In Concert on Broadway (Great Performances)		Harry Connick Jr.	PBS
2011	The 83rd Annual Academy Awards		William Ross	ABC
2011	An Evening of Stars: Tribute to Chaka Khan		Rickey Minor	NBC
2011	Hitman Returns: David Foster and Friends (Great Performances)		David Foster	PBS
2011	The Kennedy Center Honors		Rob Berman and Rob Mathes	CBS
2011	2011 Rock and Roll Hall of Fame Induction Ceremony		Paul Shaffer	Fuse
2012
2012	The Kennedy Center Honors		Rob Berman and Rob Mathes	CBS
2012	Christmas in Washington		Ian Fraser	TNT
2012	Country Music: In Performance at the White House		Steven A. Gibson	PBS
2012	Michael Feinstein: The Sinatra Legacy		Bill Elliott	PBS
2012	Seth MacFarlane: Swingin' in Concert		Joel McNeely	Epix
2012	The Thomashefskys: Music and Memories of a Life in the Yiddish Theater (Great Performances)		Michael Tilson Thomas	PBS
2013
2013	The 66th Annual Tony Awards		Elliot Lawrence	CBS
2013	Christmas in Washington		Ian Fraser	TNT
2013	The Kennedy Center Honors		Rob Berman and Rob Mathes	CBS
2013	The Oscars		William Ross	ABC
2013	Rodgers & Hammerstein's Carousel (Live from Lincoln Center)		Rob Fisher	PBS
2014
2014	The Beatles: The Night That Changed America		Don Was	CBS
2014	Barbra Streisand: Back to Brooklyn (Great Performances)		William Ross	PBS
2014	The Oscars		William Ross	ABC
2014	Saturday Night Live	"Host: Jimmy Fallon"	Lenny Pickett, Leon Pendarvis and Eli Brueggemann	NBC
2014	The Sound of Music Live!		David Chase	NBC
2014	The 67th Annual Tony Awards		Elliot Lawrence and Jamie Lawrence	CBS
2015
2015	Stevie Wonder: Songs in the Key of Life — An All-Star Grammy Salute		Greg Phillinganes	CBS
2015	Elf: Buddy's Musical Christmas		Matthew Sklar and Christopher Guardino	NBC
2015	The Kennedy Center Honors		Rob Berman and Rob Mathes	CBS
2015	The Oscars		Stephen Oremus	ABC
2015	Peter Pan Live!		David Chase	NBC
2015	Sweeney Todd: The Demon Barber of Fleet Street (Live from Lincoln Center)		Alan Gilbert	PBS
2016
2016	Danny Elfman's Music from the Films of Tim Burton (Live from Lincoln Center)		Danny Elfman	PBS
2016	Jazz at the White House		John Beasley	ABC
2016	Sinatra: Voice for a Century (Live from Lincoln Center)		Alan Gilbert	PBS
2016	Smithsonian Salutes Ray Charles: In Performance at the White House		Rickey Minor and Christian McBride	PBS
2016	A Very Murray Christmas		Paul Shaffer	Netflix
2017
2017	Taking the Stage: African American Music and Stories That Changed America		Rickey Minor	ABC
2017	American Epic	"The American Epic Sessions"	Bernard MacMahon, Duke Erikson, Jack White and T Bone Burnett	PBS
2017	Joshua Bell: Seasons of Cuba (Live from Lincoln Center)		David Lai	PBS
2017	Stayin' Alive: A Grammy Salute to the Music of the Bee Gees		Rickey Minor	CBS
2017	Super Bowl LI Halftime Show Starring Lady Gaga		Michael Bearden	Fox
2017	Tony Bennett Celebrates 90: The Best Is Yet to Come		Tom Scott	NBC
2018
2018	Tony Bennett: The Library of Congress Gershwin Prize for Popular Song		Gregg Field	PBS
2018	Bruno Mars: 24K Magic Live at the Apollo		Bruno Mars	CBS
2018	Elton John: I'm Still Standing –- A Grammy Salute		Davey Johnstone	CBS
2018	The Oscars		Harold Wheeler	ABC
2018	Super Bowl LII Halftime Show Starring Justin Timberlake		Adam Wayne Blackstone	NBC
2019
2019	Fosse/Verdon	"Life Is a Cabaret"	Alex Lacamoire	FX
2019	Aretha! A Grammy Celebration for the Queen of Soul		Rickey Minor	CBS
2019	Homecoming: A Film by Beyoncé		Beyoncé Knowles-Carter and Derek Dixie	Netflix
2019	The Oscars		Rickey Minor	ABC
2019	Q85: A Musical Celebration for Quincy Jones	"Part 1"	Greg Phillinganes	BET
2019	Saturday Night Live	"Host: Adam Sandler"	Lenny Pickett, Leon Pendarvis and Eli Brueggemann	NBC

=== 2020s ===
Year	Program	Episode	Nominees	Network
2020
2020	The Kennedy Center Honors		Rickey Minor	CBS
2020	Let's Go Crazy: The Grammy Salute to Prince		Sheila E., Jimmy Jam and Terry Lewis	CBS
2020	The Oscars		Rickey Minor	ABC
2020	Saturday Night Live	"SNL at Home #1"	Lenny Pickett, Leon Pendarvis and Eli Brueggemann	NBC
2020	Super Bowl LIV Halftime Show Starring Jennifer Lopez and Shakira		Adam Wayne Blackstone	Fox
2021
2021	Bo Burnham: Inside		Bo Burnham	Netflix
2021	Billie Eilish: The World's a Little Blurry		Aron Forbes	Apple TV+
2021	Celebrating America — An Inauguration Night Special		Rickey Minor	(Note: Celebrating America — An Inauguration Night Special was simulcast on multiple television stations simultaneously. The Emmys listed no individual network with this nomination.)
2021	David Byrne's American Utopia		Karl Mansfield	HBO
2021	Zoey's Extraordinary Playlist	"Zoey's Extraordinary Goodbye"	Harvey Mason Jr.	NBC
2022
2022	The Pepsi Super Bowl LVI Halftime Show Starring Dr. Dre, Snoop Dogg, Mary J. Blige, Eminem, Kendrick Lamar and 50 Cent		Adam Blackstone	NBC
2022	43rd Annual Kennedy Center Honors		Rickey Minor	CBS
2022	44th Annual Kennedy Center Honors		Rickey Minor	CBS
2022	One Last Time: An Evening with Tony Bennett and Lady Gaga		Michael Bearden and Lee Musiker	CBS
2022	Saturday Night Live	"Host: Jake Gyllenhaal"	Lenny Pickett, Leon Pendarvis and Eli Brueggemann	NBC
2023
2023	Library of Congress Gershwin Prize for Popular Song: Joni Mitchell		Greg Phillinganes	PBS
2023	The Apple Music Super Bowl LVII Halftime Show Starring Rihanna		Adam Blackstone and Omar Edwards	Fox
2023	The Oscars		Rickey Minor	ABC
2023	2022 Rock and Roll Hall of Fame Induction Ceremony		Adam Blackstone	HBO
2023	Saturday Night Live	"Host: Austin Butler"	Lenny Pickett, Leon Pendarvis and Eli Brueggemann	NBC
2024
2024	The Oscars		Rickey Minor	ABC
2024	Late Night with Seth Meyers	"Episode 1488"	Fred Armisen and Eli Janney	NBC
2024	The 46th Kennedy Center Honors		Rickey Minor	CBS
2024	2023 Rock and Roll Hall of Fame Induction Ceremony		Adam Blackstone, Don Was and Omar Edwards	ABC
2024	Saturday Night Live	"Host: Ryan Gosling"	Lenny Pickett, Leon Pendarvis and Eli Brueggemann	NBC
2025
2025	The Apple Music Super Bowl LIX Halftime Show Starring Kendrick Lamar		Kendrick Lamar and Tony Russell	Fox
2025	The Kennedy Center Honors		Rickey Minor	CBS
2025	The Oscars		Michael Bearden	ABC
2025	SNL50: The Anniversary Special		Lenny Pickett, Leon Pendarvis and Eli Brueggemann	NBC
2025	SNL50: The Homecoming Concert		James Poyser and Ahmir "Questlove" Thompson	Peacock
2026
2026	The Apple Music Super Bowl LX Halftime Show Starring Bad Bunny		Miguel Gandelman	NBC
2026	The Late Show with Stephen Colbert	"The Late Show with Stephen Colbert Series Finale"	Louis Cato	CBS
2026	The Oscars		Michael Bearden	ABC
2026	Saturday Night Live	"Host: Jack Black"	Lenny Pickett, Leon Pendarvis, Eli Brueggemann and Maddie Rice	NBC
2026	Wicked: One Wonderful Night		Stephen Oremus	NBC
