= Michael Bearden =

- Born: Chicago, Illinois, U.S.
- Occupations: Music director, keyboardist, arranger, conductor, composer, record producer
- Years active: 1980s–present
- Website: michaelbearden.com

Michael Bearden is an American music director, keyboardist, arranger, conductor, and composer from Chicago, Illinois. He is best known as the final music director for Michael Jackson, serving as the musical architect for the This Is It residency and the subsequent documentary film. Since 2013, he has served as the music director for Lady Gaga, overseeing her world tours and Las Vegas residencies. He has received three Primetime Emmy Award nominations for Outstanding Music Direction and has served as music director for the 97th Academy Awards (2025) and 98th Academy Awards (2026).

== Early life ==
Bearden was born and raised on the South Side of Chicago, Illinois. He began playing piano at a young age and developed his skills through the Chicago music scene. Early in his career, he moved to Washington, D.C., where he was discovered by Stevie Wonder, leading to his first major professional opportunities in the music industry.

== Career ==
=== Early work and collaborations ===
Bearden has worked as a keyboardist, arranger, and music director for numerous artists spanning multiple genres. His collaborations include Madonna, Whitney Houston, Herbie Hancock, Stevie Wonder, Sting, Carlos Santana, Lionel Richie, Chaka Khan, Lenny Kravitz, Destiny's Child, Brandy, India Arie, and Prince. In the jazz genre, he has worked with Rachelle Ferrell, Herbie Mann, Will Downing, Marion Meadows, Regina Carter, and Quincy Jones.

He contributed keyboards and arrangements to Marion Meadows' album Pleasure (1998), serving as arranger and conductor on the project.

=== Michael Jackson and This Is It ===
In 2009, Bearden was selected by Michael Jackson to serve as music director for the This Is It concert residency planned for London's The O2 Arena. Following Jackson's death on June 25, 2009, Bearden served as music director, supervisor, composer, and associate producer for the documentary film Michael Jackson's This Is It (2009).

=== Lopez Tonight ===
From 2009 to 2011, Bearden served as bandleader and music director for the late-night talk show Lopez Tonight on TBS, hosted by George Lopez.

=== Lady Gaga (2013–present) ===
Since 2013, Bearden has served as the primary music director for Lady Gaga. His work includes the Joanne World Tour (2017–2018), the Chromatica Ball (2022), and her Las Vegas residencies Lady Gaga Enigma + Jazz & Piano (2018–2020, 2022–2023). He directed music for Gaga's Super Bowl LI halftime show (2017), earning a Primetime Emmy Award nomination for Outstanding Music Direction, and for the television special One Last Time: An Evening with Tony Bennett and Lady Gaga (2021), earning a second Emmy nomination.

He appeared as a super group keyboardist in Gaga's film A Star Is Born (2018).

=== Academy Awards ===
Bearden served as music director for the 97th Academy Awards (2025) and 98th Academy Awards (2026), the latter described by Rolling Stone as his return "to helm the award ceremony's sound for the second time." His work on the 97th Oscars earned him a third Emmy nomination for Outstanding Music Direction.

=== Film and television scoring ===
Bearden's film scoring credits include Michael Jackson's This Is It (2009), American Blackout (2006), High on the Hog: How African American Cuisine Transformed America (2021), Hip Hop Uncovered (2021), Kevin Hart & Chris Rock: Headliners Only (2023), Outlaw Johnny Black (2023), and Gaga: Chromatica Ball (2024).

== Awards and nominations ==
Year	Award	Category	Work	Result	Ref.
2017	Primetime Emmy Awards	Outstanding Music Direction	Super Bowl LI halftime show with Lady Gaga	Nominated	
2021	Primetime Emmy Awards	Outstanding Music Direction	One Last Time: An Evening with Tony Bennett and Lady Gaga	Nominated	
2025	Primetime Emmy Awards	Outstanding Music Direction	97th Academy Awards	Nominated	
2026	Primetime Emmy Awards	Outstanding Music Direction	98th Academy Awards	Nominated	
