= Love for Sale (song) =

1930 popular song by Cole Porter

- Sheet music, 1930

Song by Kathryn Crawford
- Published: 1930 by Harms
- Released: 1930
- Genre: Jazz; traditional pop
- Songwriter: Cole Porter

"Love for Sale" is a song by Cole Porter introduced by Kathryn Crawford in the musical The New Yorkers, which opened on Broadway on December 8, 1930, and closed in May 1931 after 168 performances. The song is written from the viewpoint of a prostitute advertising "love for sale". The song entered the American public domain on January 1, 2026 when its copyright expired. (Note: Its renewed copyright expired on January 1, 2026 when all published/properly copyrighted works from 1930 works did as explained by Duke Law's Center for the Study of the Public Domain.)

== Early versions ==
The song's chorus, like many in the Great American Songbook, is written in the A-A-B-A format. However, instead of 32 bars, it has 64, plus an eight-bar tag. The tag is often dropped when the song is performed. The tune, like many of Porter's, shifts between a major and minor feeling. The A section is in the key of B-flat minor before modulating to B-flat major and back.

== Background ==
When the song came out in 1930, a newspaper labelled it as "in bad taste"; radio stations avoided broadcasting it. Because of the complaints, Porter shifted the setting of the song in the musical to the Cotton Club in Harlem, where it was sung by an African American, Elisabeth Welch, instead of white singer Kathryn Crawford.

Popular recordings in 1931 were made by Libby Holman and by Fred Waring's Pennsylvanians. The Jack Teagarden Orchestra recorded the song in February 1940, with Kitty Kallen as the featured vocalist.

== Recordings ==
- Billie Holiday recorded a version of the song in 1952.
- Joyce Bryant released a version in 1952 on a 10″, 78 rpm promo and in 1954 on her album Runnin' Wild with orchestra under direction of Joe Reisman.
- Ella Fitzgerald recorded the song for her 1956 album Ella Fitzgerald Sings the Cole Porter Song Book.
- Tony Bennett recorded a version of this on his 1957 album The Beat of My Heart.
- Eartha Kitt recorded it for her album Bad but Beautiful (1962), with several other renditions throughout her career.
- Mel Tormé performed scat versions in 1979 on the Merv Griffin Show with Buddy Rich and a live version on the 1981 LP Mel Torme and Friends.
- Vic Godard and the Subway Sect, for his 1982 album Songs for Sale

It is also widely recorded as a jazz standard. Instrumental versions included those by Sidney Bechet, Erroll Garner, Stan Kenton, Charlie Parker, The 3 Sounds, Art Tatum, Cannonball Adderley, Dexter Gordon, Buddy Rich, Ryo Fukui, and Cecil Taylor. There is a version of the song by Hal Kemp's Orchestra & The Smoothies, 1940.

== Tony Bennett and Lady Gaga version ==
"Love for Sale"

Promotional single by Tony Bennett and Lady Gaga

from the album Love for Sale
- Released: September 17, 2021
- Studio: Electric Lady (New York City)
- Genre: Jazz
- Length: 3:40
- Label: Streamline; Columbia; Interscope
- Songwriter: Cole Porter
- Producer: Dae Bennett

Music video
- "Love for Sale" on YouTube

=== Background and reception ===
Tony Bennett and Lady Gaga released a collaborative jazz album, titled Cheek to Cheek, in 2014. Shortly after the album was released, Bennett asked Gaga if she would like to record another album with him, this time with songs written by Cole Porter. Accepting the invitation, the duo recorded their second collaborative album, Love for Sale. After the record was finished, they went through all the songs to settle on an album title, and decided to name it after the song "Love for Sale", which was Bennett's favorite. "Love for Sale" was later chosen as the second single off the album, released on September 17, 2021, to digital retailers. The duo's rendition of the Cole Porter standard is an old-fashioned duet, trading lines and harmonies over the joyous, up-tempo big band arrangement. The song starts with Bennett softly singing the lines alone, with the big band arrangement joining him at the chorus. Gaga, in the role of streetwalker, joins him and trills: "Who will buy?" The track also involves a bebop saxophone solo. Their rendition brings a "hearty helping of old-school Broadway razzle-dazzle" to the "grim scenario", the "sleazy world of sex work".

Justin Curto of Vulture believed that Bennett and Gaga's fruitful collaborative relationship is "on prime display" in the song, which sees "the singers go toe-to-toe on the sensuous standard". NME's El Hunt thought that in the song, Gaga "channels the arm-swinging enthusiasm of a milkmaid dancing through an Oliver! show tune: 'Who will buy?' she hollers." According to Derrick Rossignol at Uproxx, the song "shows that Bennett hasn't lost his vocal chops even at 95 years old and that Gaga remains an excellent accompaniment for the legend." Ross Horton of The Line of Best Fit thought that "Love for Sale", along with the album's opening two tracks, "It's De-Lovely" and "Night and Day", showcase how well the duo's vocals come together, saying, "Bennett and Gaga's voices seem to bounce off each other, and become emboldened and enlivened by its presence." Mary Siroky of Consequence felt that the duo is "imbuing the title track with refreshing, heartfelt energy." Eric Handerson from Slant Magazine was critical of their version of the song, which "sung from the POV [point of view] of a sex worker, makes literally no sense as a duet."

=== Music video and promotion ===
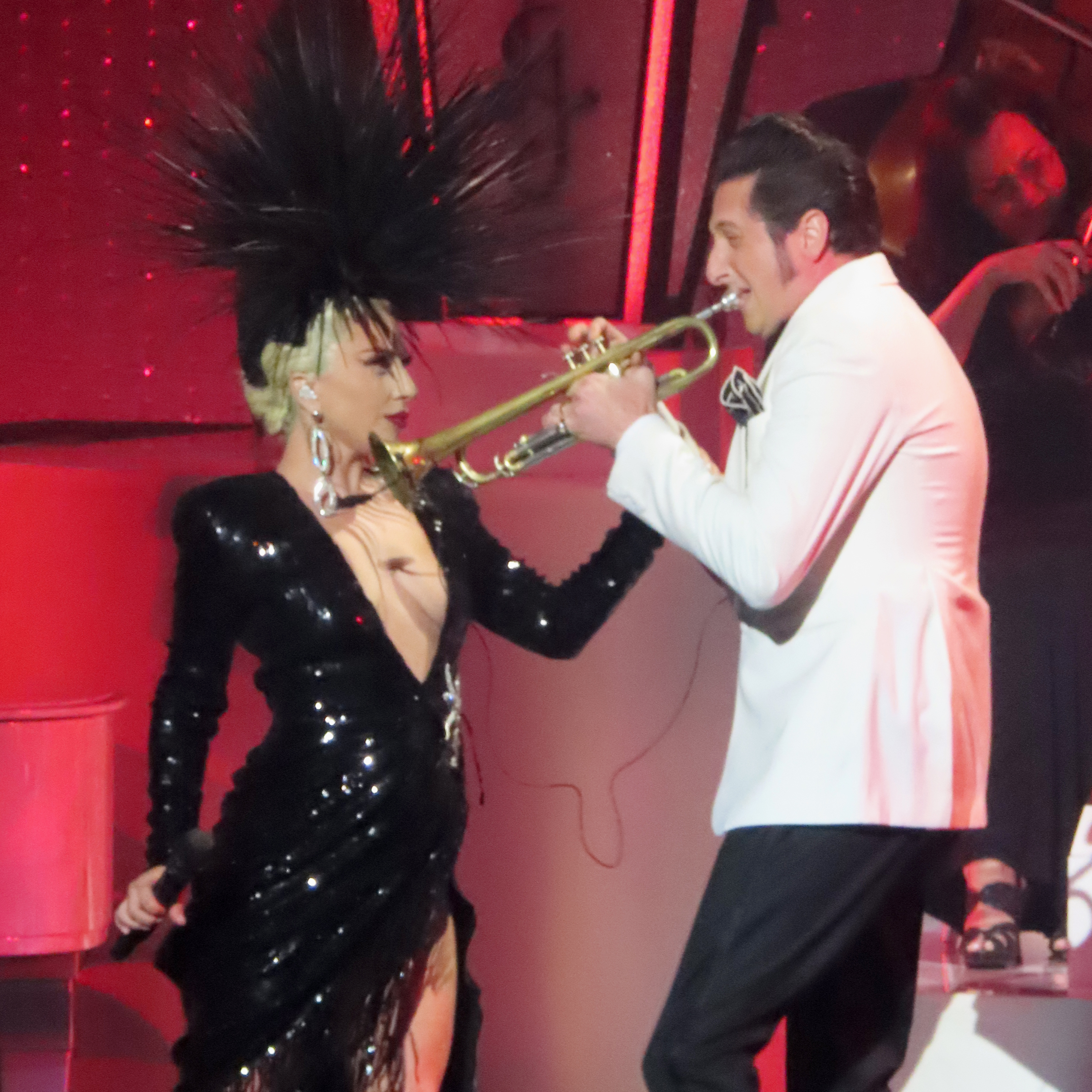
Lady Gaga during a solo performance of "Love for Sale" at her Jazz & Piano residency in Las Vegas, accompanied by trumpeter Brian Newman (pictured in 2022)

The accompanying music video premiered on MTV on September 18, 2021, and showcases the recording sessions of the song in the studio. The visual is cut with clips of the pair laughing together, hugging each other, and occasional close-up shots of the big band. Entertainment Weekly's Joey Nolfi called the music video "tear-jerking", "which highlights their deep, mutual adoration as they stare lovingly into each other's eyes while singing the tune." Cillea Houghton of ABC News noted that in the video "Gaga treats [the studio session] more as a performance than simply singing into a microphone, dancing alongside Tony as they sing". Justin Curto of Vulture wrote that in the video the duo are "showcasing the sort of connection" with each other "that you just can't form over a day in the studio. Whatever they're selling? We'll take it."

On July 2, 2021, Bennett and Gaga performed "Love for Sale" and other songs in front of an intimate studio audience in New York City. It was recorded for MTV Unplugged, which aired on MTV on December 16, 2021, while the performance of "Love for Sale" was also released as a standalone video on YouTube a week earlier. The duo gave a performance at Radio City Music Hall on August 3 and 5, 2021, called One Last Time: an Evening with Tony Bennett and Lady Gaga, and "Love for Sale" was one of the duets they performed together. The performance was later included in a television special of the same name, which premiered on CBS and Paramount+ on November 28, 2021. After Bennett retired from performing live on "doctors' orders", Gaga gave solo performances of the song, including on her Jazz & Piano Vegas residency, and at the 64th Annual Grammy Awards, where she performed the song along with "Do I Love You?".

== See also ==
- List of 1930s jazz standards
