= I Get a Kick Out of You =

1934 song by Cole Porter

Song by Ethel Merman
- B-side: "You're The Top"
- Released: 1934 by Harms, Inc.
- Genre: Traditional pop
- Length: 3:07
- Label: Brunswick
- Songwriter: Cole Porter

"I Get a Kick Out of You" is a song by Cole Porter, which was first sung in the 1934 Broadway musical Anything Goes, and then in the 1936 film version. Originally sung by Ethel Merman, it has been covered by dozens of other performers, including Frank Sinatra, Dolly Parton, and Ella Fitzgerald. John Serry's arrangement was featured on Seeburg jukeboxes nationwide during the 1950s. A cover by Mel Tormé won the 1996 Grammy Award for Best Instrumental Arrangement with Accompanying Vocal(s) for arranger Rob McConnell, while a duet version by Tony Bennett and Lady Gaga was nominated for three awards at the 2022 ceremony, including Record of the Year.

== Alterations to the song ==
The lyrics were first altered shortly after being written. The last verse originally went as follows:

I get no kick in a plane
I shouldn't care for those nights in the air
That the fair Mrs. Lindbergh goes through
But I get a kick out of you.

After the 1932 Lindbergh kidnapping, Porter changed the second and third lines to:

Flying too high with some guy in the sky
Is my idea of nothing to do

In the 1936 movie version, alternative lyrics in the second verse were provided to replace a reference to the drug cocaine, which was not allowed by Hollywood's Production Code of 1934.

The original verse goes as follows:

Some get a kick from cocaine
I'm sure that if
I took even one sniff
That would bore me terrif-
Ically, too
Yet, I get a kick out of you

Porter changed the first line to:

Some like the perfume from Spain

Frank Sinatra recorded both pre-Code and post-Code versions (with and without the cocaine reference): the first in 1953 and the second in 1962. On a recording live in Paris in 1962 (not released until 1994), Sinatra sings the altered version with the first line as "Some like the perfume from Spain". Other Porter-approved substitutions include "whiff of Guerlain." There is also a version with the lines "Some like the bop-type refrain, I'm sure that if I heard even one riff..." on Sinatra and Swingin' Brass.

All three of the above alternatives are mentioned in the liner notes to Joan Morris and William Bolcom's CD, Night and Day; on the recording, Morris sings the original second verse.

== Tony Bennett and Lady Gaga version ==
"I Get a Kick Out of You"

Single by Tony Bennett and Lady Gaga

from the album Love for Sale
- Released: August 3, 2021
- Studio: Electric Lady (New York City)
- Genre: Jazz
- Length: 3:33
- Label: Streamline; Columbia; Interscope
- Songwriter: Cole Porter
- Producer: Dae Bennett

Tony Bennett singles chronology
"I Can't Give You Anything but Love" (2014)	"I Get a Kick Out of You" (2021)

Lady Gaga singles chronology
"Free Woman" (2021)	"I Get a Kick Out of You" (2021)	"Hold My Hand" (2022)

Music video
- "I Get a Kick Out of You" on YouTube

=== Background and reception ===
Tony Bennett and Lady Gaga recorded a version of the song for their second collaborative album, Love for Sale. It was released as the first single from the album on August 3, 2021, to digital retailers. The recording sessions for the song took place at Electric Lady Studios in downtown New York City. AARP the Magazine revealed that Bennett was a "considerably more muted presence during the recording of the new album with Gaga", as he was diagnosed with Alzheimer's disease in 2016, before the sessions began. The duo's version is "a campy take" on "I Get a Kick Out of You". They are backed by "jaunty piano" at the beginning of the track, with Gaga slowly starting the song with the line "My story is much too sad to be told, but practically everything leads me totally cold." Bennett then picks up with "The only exception I know is the case..." line, and when he says “Then, I see your fabulous face", Gaga jokingly asks Bennett, "Are you talking about me?" The big band arrangement then commences, and accompanies the two for the rest of the song.

Rolling Stone's Jon Blistein described the song as "delightfully classic", and thought that "the two vocalists exude plenty of chemistry". Heran Mamo of Billboard opined that while Gaga's "portion of the first verse does anything but leave us totally cold", Bennett's "beautifully raspy vocals leave his counterpart emotional", and thought that "the full band breathes new life into Cole Porter's classic tune". Helen Brown of The Independent thought the song revolves around "the mutual appreciation" of the pair for each other, "on which Bennett nails the dizzying internal rhyme scheme of lines such as: 'Flying too high with some girl in the sky is my idea of nothing to do...'" Neil McCormick of The Daily Telegraph found Gaga and Bennett sounding the happiest on the album when they are "diving into the witty wordplay" of "I Get a Kick Out of You" and "You're the Top". Alexis Petridis of The Guardian thought the song was evidence that Bennett's health condition didn't seem to affect the chemistry between the duo. Athena Serrano from MTV noted that "Bennett doesn't fail to deliver his strong vocals even at 95." At The Arts Desk, Sebastian Scotney highlighted the track for its "genuinely touching moment" where "Bennett finds that authentically urgent and passionate vocal colour he had in tracks such as "A Child is Born" or "Make Someone Happy" on the classic album Together Again with Bill Evans." While reviewing the album, Robin Murray of Clash wrote that "Love For Sale hinges on the neat chemistry between the two, their nimble performances fuelling a later turn on 'I Get A Kick Out Of You'."

=== Music video ===
The accompanying music video premiered on MTV on August 6, 2021. It begins with Bennett saying "All set", and Gaga laughing and stating that "Tony's always ready". It then shows Bennett and Gaga recording the song, while they smile at each other and hug several times emotionally. Gaga appears wearing a simple black dress, while Bennett wears a blue suit and tie. The video shows Bennett snapping his fingers, lending several thumbs up to the instrumental proceedings, and winking at Gaga. At one moment of the video, Gaga rests her head on Bennett's shoulder, while another part shows a closeup of Gaga, revealing tears in her eyes. The video had a positive reception, with critics calling it "heartwarming", "emotional" and "sweet".

=== Accolades ===
The song was nominated for Record of the Year and Best Pop Duo/Group Performance at the 64th Annual Grammy Awards, while its music video received a nomination in the Best Music Video category.

=== Release history ===
Release dates and formats for "I Get a Kick Out of You"
Region	Date	Format(s)	Label(s)	Ref.
Various	August 3, 2021	Digital download; streaming	Columbia; Interscope	
Italy	September 17, 2021	Radio airplay	Universal	

== Other covers ==
- In 1954, Charlie Parker recorded the song in a quartet format.
- In 1968, schlager singer Hildegard Knef released a version of the song with German lyrics by Mischa Mleinek titled "Nichts haut mich um, aber du" ("Nothing Knocks Me Over But You").
- In 1974, Australian singer Gary Shearston released a 1920s/30s style version. Issued on the Charisma label, it entered the UK Singles Chart on October 5, 1974, and had an eight week run on the charts with a peak position of No. 7.

== Parodies ==
- On the children’s show Sesame Street, Ethel Mermaid, a mermaid Ethel Merman spoof, sings “I Get a Kick Out of U”, explaining how no letter of the alphabet thrills her more than the letter U.
- In the film Blazing Saddles, two railroad construction workers, Bart (Cleavon Little) and Charlie (Charles MacGregor), sing a portion of the pre-code rendition after being asked by railroad overseer Lyle, (Burton Gilliam), to sing him a work song.
- MF Doom referenced a portion of this song in intro of his 2004 hit "One Beer" off of the Mm..Food album.
