= Love for Sale (Tony Bennett and Lady Gaga album) =

2021 album by Tony Bennett and Lady Gaga

- Standard edition cover

Studio album by Tony Bennett and Lady Gaga
- Released: September 30, 2021
- Recorded: 2018–2020
- Studio: Electric Lady (New York City)
- Genre: Jazz
- Length: 36:00
- Labels: Columbia; Streamline; Interscope
- Producer: Dae Bennett

Tony Bennett chronology
| Love Is Here to Stay (2018) | Love for Sale (2021) |

Lady Gaga chronology
| Dawn of Chromatica (2021) | Love for Sale (2021) | Top Gun: Maverick (2022) |

Singles from Love for Sale
- 1. "I Get a Kick Out of You" Released: August 3, 2021

Love for Sale is the second and final collaborative album by American singers Tony Bennett and Lady Gaga, released on September 30, 2021, by Columbia, Streamline and Interscope Records. It is the sixty-first and final studio album of Bennett's career, and Gaga's seventh. Following Cheek to Cheek (2014), the duo's first collaborative album, Love for Sale was recorded between 2018 and early 2020, consisting of their renditions of various jazz standards by American composer Cole Porter, to whom the record is a tribute.

Upon release, Love for Sale received generally favorable reviews from music critics, most of whom highlighted the vocal chemistry between Bennett and Gaga. The album charted inside the top 10 of albums charts in various countries. On the US Billboard 200, it debuted at number 8 as the duo's second top-10 entry, and garnered Bennett the individual record for the longest span of top-10 albums for any living artist; his first top-10 record was I Left My Heart in San Francisco in 1962. Bennett also broke the Guinness World Record for the oldest person to release an album of new material, at the age of 95 years and 60 days.

The album was preceded by the release of the single "I Get a Kick Out of You" and the title track. The duo gave a recorded performance at Radio City Music Hall on August 3 and 5, 2021, called One Last Time: An Evening with Tony Bennett and Lady Gaga, before Bennett retired from performing live. The special received four nominations at the 74th Primetime Emmy Awards. The album's promotion also include the duo's appearance on MTV Unplugged, and solo performances by Gaga, such as her Jazz & Piano residency show and at the 64th Annual Grammy Awards. At the Grammys, the album won Best Traditional Pop Vocal Album and Best Engineered Album, Non-Classical, and was nominated for Album of the Year, while the track "I Get a Kick Out of You" was nominated for Record of the Year, Best Pop Duo/Group Performance and Best Music Video.

== Background ==
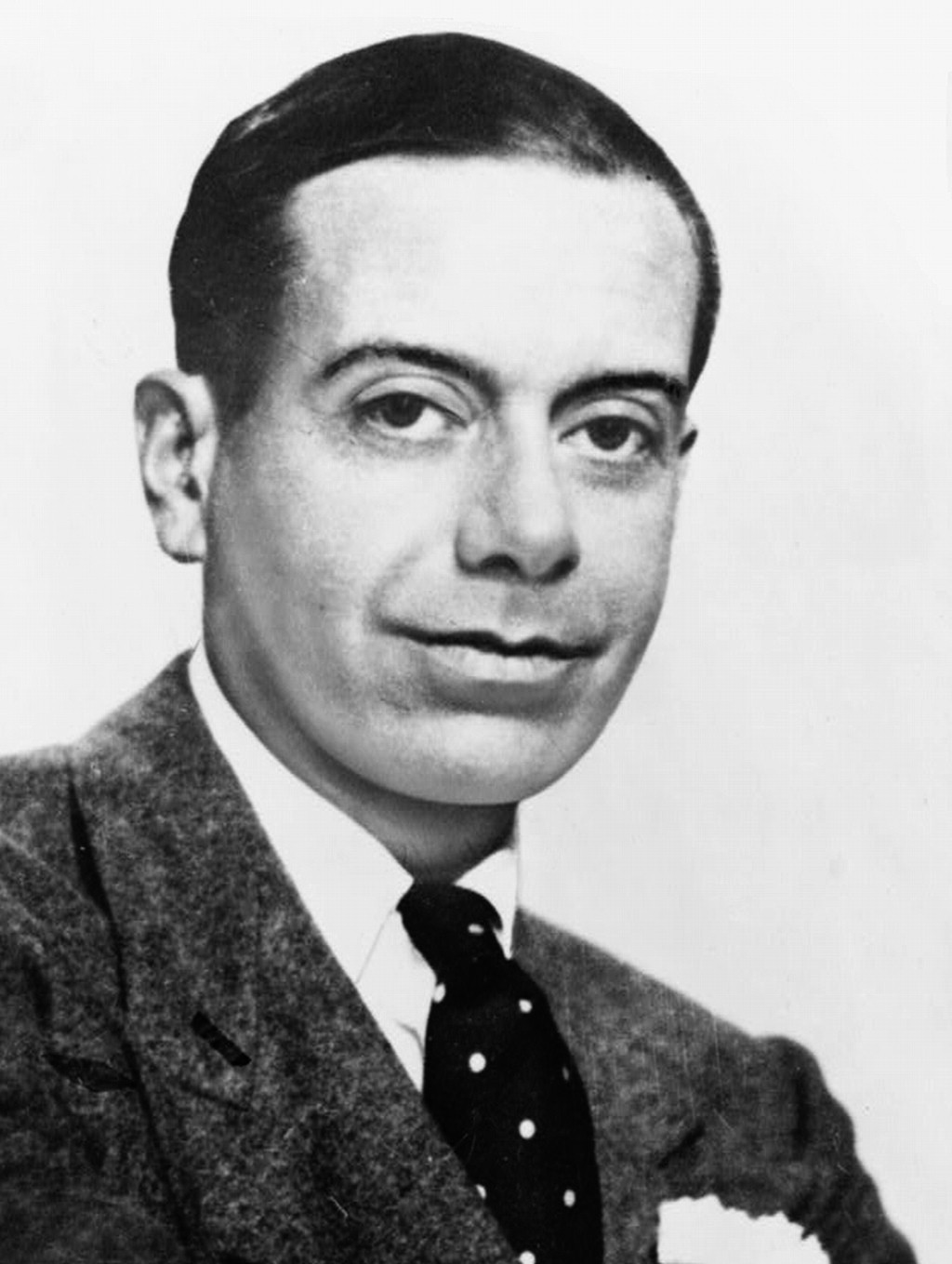
Love for Sale is a Cole Porter tribute album.

Love for Sale is a follow-up to Cheek to Cheek (2014), Tony Bennett and Lady Gaga's first collaborative album. Bennett and Gaga first met in 2011 at the Robin Hood Foundation gala in New York City. After that, Bennett asked Gaga to sing a duet with him on his album Duets II, so they recorded the song "The Lady Is a Tramp". The next year, he confirmed to Rolling Stone that Gaga wanted to record a jazz album with him; he then recorded said album Cheek to Cheek between June 2013 and early 2014. After debuting atop of the US Billboard 200, with 131,000 copies sold in its first week, Bennett told Billboard that they were inspired by Porter's 1936 musical, Red, Hot and Blue, for a possible sequel to Cheek to Cheek. He also said: "we're gonna do two albums in a row with her [Gaga]. We'll have to try and do that as soon as possible, just as a follow-up for a second album." Upon the announcement of Love for Sale, on August 3, 2021, Gaga commented on Twitter:

The day we released Cheek to Cheek in 2014, Tony Bennett called me and asked me if I wanted to record another album with him, this time celebrating the songs of Cole Porter. I'm always honored to sing with my friend Tony, so of course I accepted the invitation.

Love for Sale was announced to be Bennett's final album, following his diagnosis of Alzheimer's disease in 2016.

== Development and composition ==
=== Production ===
"Love for Sale's title winks at the notoriety that singers like Bennett used to have. Back when Lolita was listening to his records, crooners were maligned by moralists as predators, preying on the supposedly easily manipulated feelings of their youthful listeners. But the album sweeps aside such slurs. It underlines the wit, skill, feeling and musicianship invested in the best pop songs—an observation as true of Gaga's modern era as it is of Bennett's nearly vanished one."

— Ludovic Hunter-Tilney of the Financial Times talking about the title of the album

The recording and finalizing of Love for Sale saw numerous delays due to Gaga's other projects – such as the movie A Star Is Born (2018) and solo albums Joanne (2016) and Chromatica (2020) – and the COVID-19 pandemic. Recording sessions took place at Electric Lady Studios in New York, between 2018 and early 2020. All songs on the album are written by Cole Porter, to whom the record is a tribute. The Arts Desk's Sebastian Scotney felt that Love for Sale is "a calmer, less histrionic album than its predecessor", Cheek to Cheek, indicative of how "the Bennett/Gaga partnership has also evolved", and furthermore he found it more cohesive as the "Cole Porter songs bring a unifying thread". After the record was finished, Gaga and Bennett went through all the songs to choose the album title, and decided to name it after the song "Love for Sale", which was Bennett's favorite.

According to Sebastian Scotney, "the arrangements mostly alternate between Basie-ish swing for quartet or small band, and a smoochier vibe with studio orchestra textures in which 'with strings', gloops of swoopy countermelody and reharmonisation are contrasted with flutes or oboes, vibes and piano." El Hunt from NME noted that "in Gaga's hands, certain lyrics take on a tongue in cheek contemporary meaning".

In an article at The Wall Street Journal, Marc Myers wrote that "Bennett appears a bit detached when he isn't singing" in behind-the-scenes videos of the album, but Gaga explained, "as soon as the music started, Tony knew exactly where he was".

=== Songs ===
Love for Sale is primarily composed of old Broadway hits, reinvigorated by Gaga and Bennett with their own style and twist on these classics. The standard edition includes 10 tracks; the deluxe edition includes two additional tracks.

The album opens with Gaga and Bennett's version of "It's De-Lovely", accompanied by a "rattle of drums and blare of brass". The second song, "Night and Day" uses xylophones and flutes to add to the pair's duet. The title track "Love for Sale" involves a bebop saxophone solo. Ludovic Hunter-Tilney in the Financial Times noted that the song brings a "hearty helping of old-school Broadway razzle-dazzle" to the "grim scenario", the "sleazy world of sex work".

The fourth track, also the first solo song on the album is a melodramatic rendition of "Do I Love You" sang by Gaga, with orchestral accompaniment. It is followed by a swing song, "I've Got You Under My Skin". Gaga, who has a tattoo of a sketch that Bennett made of Miles Davis' trumpet on her arm, made a slight change to the lyrics, singing "like a tattoo under my skin", to which Bennett responds with delighted laughter.

The sixth track "I Concentrate on You" is a mid-tempo duet with the pair's flirtations addressed to one another. The seventh track is the duo's "campy" take on "I Get a Kick Out of You", which starts with a "jaunty piano", and Gaga slowly singing the first lines. Bennett then picks up, and when he sings the line "Then, I see your fabulous face", Gaga jokingly asks him, "Are you talking about me?" The big band arrangement subsequently accompanies the two for the rest of the song. According to Helen Brown in The Independent, Bennett "sounds genuinely desperate with devotion" in his solo rendition of "So in Love", while in her solo number of "Let's Do It", Gaga "goes full musical theatre, humming appreciatively as trumpeter Brian Newman lets rip with a solo," says NME's El Hunt.

The tenth track "Dream Dancing" was described as a "swansong to [the duo's] partnership" by The Observer's Cragg Michael. Bennett sings alone in bonus track "Just One of Those Things", a "nimble swing number" with a hot-club guitar solo. Mary Siroky of Consequence found the second and last bonus offering, "You're the Top" a "cheeky" track where the duo is "playfully bouncing back and forth".

== Release ==
Love for Sale was released on cassette format on September 30, 2021, with other formats following on October 1. The standard editions of the album contain ten songs, while the digital editions, the Target exclusive editions, and the international deluxe editions contain two additional songs, "I've Got You Under My Skin" and "You're the Top". The international deluxe CD includes two poster fold booklets, photos, and a bonus live album, Cheek to Cheek Live!, containing songs from the television special of the same name. Cassettes were released with differing artworks in pale pink and grey colors; apricot copies were sold exclusively in the United Kingdom. Besides the normal black iteration, the standard edition's vinyl records were also released in yellow color, an Amazon-exclusive cream color, and on 12" picture disc. The deluxe edition's vinyl is available as part of an international double vinyl box set, which also includes the duo's previous collaborative album, Cheek to Cheek, along with a turntable slipmat and a vinyl cleaning cloth, both with pictures of Bennett and Gaga printed on them. A limited edition collectible box set comprises the Love for Sale standard vinyl, a custom embossed sketchbook featuring sketches by Tony Bennett, a pencil/sharpener set, photos, lithographs, watercolor prints, concert poster reprints and a re-printed letter. With the release of Love for Sale, Bennett broke a Guinness World Records title for being the oldest person to release an album of new material at the age of 95 years and 60 days.

=== Artworks ===
The album cover artwork of the standard and digital editions include a photo of Bennett holding a sketchbook that depicts a profile sketch of Gaga, while Gaga is leaning down fixing Bennett's bowtie. People who pre-ordered the album in any format from Lady Gaga's online store had a chance to win the cover art signed by Gaga and Bennett. The Target versions of the CD and vinyl feature an alternative artwork, showcasing Gaga wearing a black gown, with Bennett standing next to her in tuxedo, holding her arm. On September 14, they announced four limited alternate covers available in CD format. They were also released as a digital signature album specifically for the U.S. market.

== Promotion ==
Due to his health condition, Bennett was unable to participate in promotional interviews. On September 30, 2021, Gaga appeared solo on Apple Music's "First Listen" streaming event, where she discussed the making of Love for Sale with Zane Lowe, answered questions from fans and played songs from the album shortly before its release. In that same month, she released the Love for Sale Eyeshadow Palette through her makeup brand, Haus Laboratories, which was inspired by the creation of the album.

=== Singles and videos ===
The duo in the video for "I Concentrate on You", which depicts the sketch session resulting in Bennett's drawing on the album cover

"I Get a Kick Out of You" was released as the first single from the album on August 3, to digital retailers, and its accompanying music video premiered on MTV on August 6. The title track was released as a promotional single on September 17, while the video premiered the following day, also on MTV. On the album's debut day, they released three different music videos: "I Concentrate on You", "I've Got You Under My Skin", which premiered on MTV, and "Dream Dancing", released exclusively by the Italian radio station Radio Monte Carlo. A video for "Night and Day" premiered on MTV on October 29, 2021. All the released videos were shot at Electric Lady Studios during recording sessions of each song, with the exception of "I Concentrate On You", which shows the sketch session which resulted in Bennett's drawing appearing on the album cover of Love for Sale's standard edition. The music videos had a positive critical reception, with journalists highlighting the duo's visible connection and mutual adoration for each other.

Two days before the release of Love for Sale, an album trailer video appeared on Gaga's YouTube channel with clips from the studio sessions, including performances of tracks from the album and an interview, in which Gaga and Bennett talk about working together, their friendship, and keeping jazz and the Great American Songbook alive for future generations.

=== Live performances and specials ===
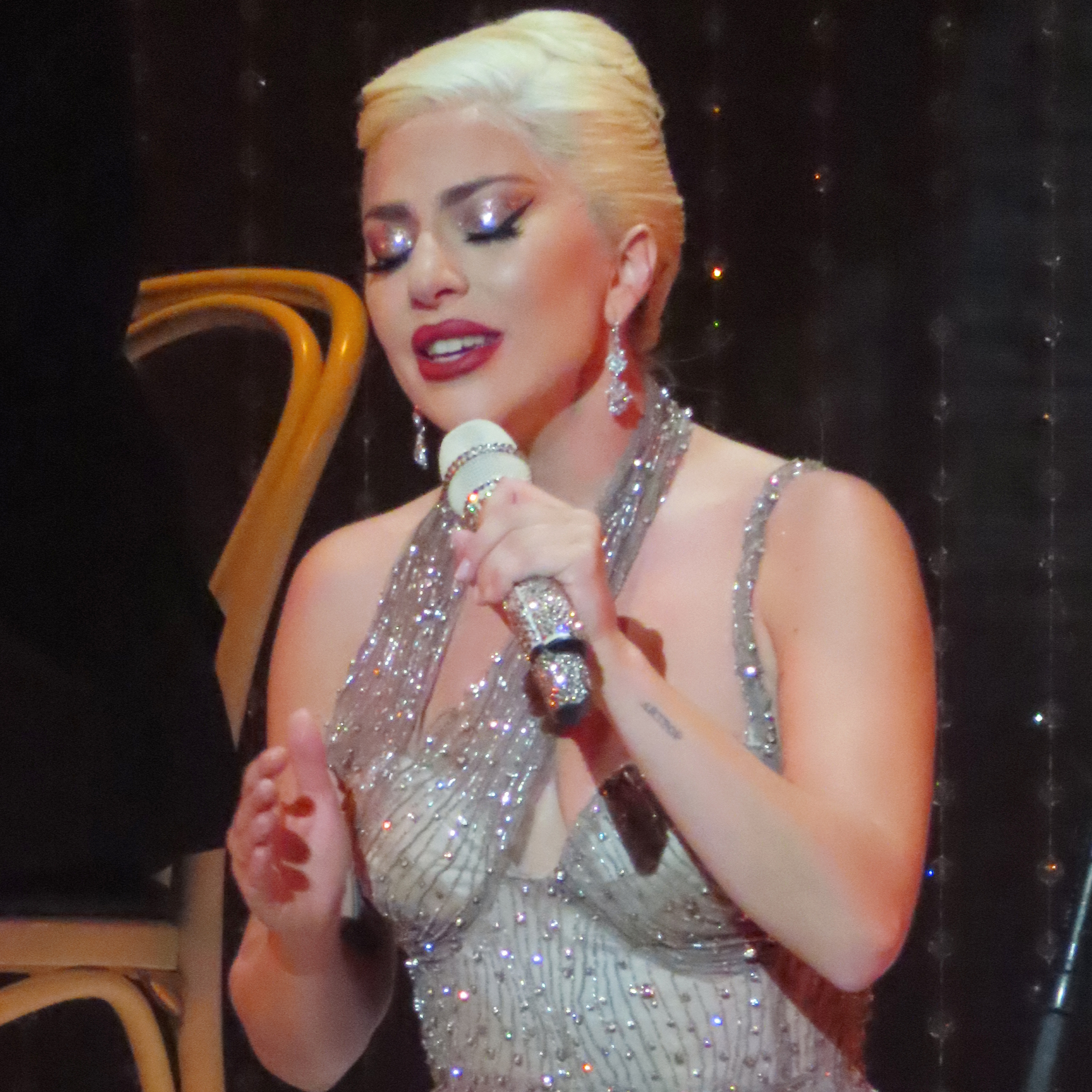
Gaga performing "Do I Love You" at her Jazz & Piano residency in Las Vegas

Bennett and Gaga presented a pair of shows at Radio City Music Hall, on August 3 and 5, 2021, called One Last Time: An Evening with Tony Bennett and Lady Gaga. They were Bennett's final public performances, as shortly after he retired from performing live on "doctors' orders". Music journalists complimented the vocal skills of both performers, and called the shows "emotional" and "miraculous". An hour-long special of the same name, which is the filmed rendering of the two concerts, simultaneously premiered on CBS and Paramount+ on November 28, 2021. It consisted of select duets and solo performances, including Love for Sale's "Let's Do It" and the title track. The special received four nominations at the 74th Primetime Emmy Awards. The duo's final televised performance together was on December 16, 2021, in MTV Unplugged. It was filmed the previous July in front of an intimate studio audience in New York City, and included duets of "Night and Day", "I've Got You Under My Skin", and "Love for Sale".

To celebrate the release of Love for Sale, Gaga teamed up with Westfield for a live-streamed concert experience on September 30, 2021, through their virtual platform or within physical Fan Zones in 21 Westfield centres across the United States and Europe. Her set included "Night and Day", "Let's Do It" and the title track of the album, among other jazz standards and her own songs. On October 14, 2021, she continued her Jazz & Piano residency in Las Vegas after a long hiatus due to the COVID-19 pandemic, and updated the setlist with songs from Love for Sale ("Let's Do It", "Do I Love You", "You're the Top" and the title track). On April 3, 2022, Gaga gave a performance of "Do I Love You" and the title track at the 64th Annual Grammy Awards, while videos of her and Bennett recording in the studio played behind her. The gig was described as a "gloriously theatrical and somehow-also-touching tribute to her ailing duet partner Tony Bennett" in The New York Times.

== Critical reception ==
Professional ratings
Aggregate scores
| Source | Rating |
|---|---|
| AnyDecentMusic? | 7.3/10 |
| Metacritic | 70/100 |
Review scores
| Source | Rating |
| AllMusic | 3/5 stars |
| And It Don't Stop | A |
| Clash | 7/10 |
| The Daily Telegraph | 4/5 stars |
| The Guardian | 3/5 stars |
| The Independent | 5/5 stars |
| NME | 3/5 stars |
| The Observer | 3/5 stars |
| Rolling Stone | 3/5 stars |
| Under the Radar | 8/10 |

Love for Sale was met with generally positive reviews. At Metacritic, which assigns a normalized rating out of 100 to reviews from professional critics, Love for Sale received a weighted average score of 70, based on 11 reviews.

In the Rolling Stone review for the album, Joe Gross calls Bennett and Gaga's collaboration "a superhero team-up that has produced another album of rock-solid takes on the American songbook". Writing for The Independent, Helen Brown also praises Love for Sale's versions of Cole Porter's songs, stating that while Porter's songwriting "is sometimes criticised for a lack of emotional depth Bennett and Gaga dance through his witty wordplay and bring nuanced humanity" and that the duo "have a chemistry that crackles against the odds". Austin Saalman of Under the Radar called it "one of the finest jazz releases in a long while", which is "a treat for those interested in listening to two greats who, while existing generations apart, possess the same authoritative grasp as both recording and performance artists." Cragg Michael of The Observer found Love for Sale "ebullient" and "immaculately produced", which "feels like a fond farewell rather than a solemn goodbye" to Bennett's career. Ross Horton of The Line of Best Fit thought that the album was "rather charming", and said: "This is neither an essential nor an endlessly replayable record - but what it is, thankfully, is a delightful entry point to the works of Tony Bennett."

Writing for The Guardian, Alexis Petridis described the album as "being infectiously good fun". He noted that Gaga "occasionally feels as if she's enjoying herself too much to inject the requisite pathos into a song" and that the singer is better served for "lighter, more uptempo love songs". Stephen Thomas Erlewine of AllMusic thought that the album was "light and sweet", where "Gaga sings with total awareness of the audience, hitting her marks with a sense of flair, while Bennett is pleasing the crowd with casual charm." He appreciated this dynamic "that gives the album a pulse and helps distract from the slight air of televised variety shows that permeate the record." Similarly, El Hunt stated in a review for NME that the finest moments of the album are when the two artists "playfully trade lines and sing in unison, with the veteran singer countering his collaborator's belting vocal with artful restraint".

Some critics noted that Bennett's age and health has impacted his vocals. Hunt said his voice "has become rougher and raspier with age", while music journalist Neil McCormick described it as "so thin it has become almost translucent" in a review for The Daily Telegraph. Petridis calls Bennett's performance "pretty remarkable" despite the singer's age and health condition in his review for The Guardian. David Smyth of the Evening Standard found his voice "husky but strong". Mary Siroky of Consequence thought that Gaga "does quite a bit of heavy lifting on Love for Sale, but Bennett's vocals remain crystal clear", and opined that the record works the best "when the two are together." Eric Handerson from Slant Magazine slammed the album, criticizing Gaga for her vocal skills as a jazz singer and for "dragging Tony Bennett, who was diagnosed with Alzheimer's disease in 2016, into the studio for another go at the brassy ring."

By contrast, then-80-year-old critic Robert Christgau admitted that he had "failed to register" not only that "all 12 titles are by pantheon wit-and-a-half Cole Porter", but also that "Alzheimer's has been found to be much easier on your verbal memory if you are singing, at which point lyrics you could once recite verbatim pour past your vocal chords and into the air as if they were notes on a scale, as they also are." Christgau added in conclusion that Bennett has retained "a larynx worthy of the name, which not every singer of 75 much less 95 can claim", and "sounds leaner, a bit drier, but also capable of enunciating every word in a long-cultivated New York accent whose miraculous juice and intuitive smarts could make an 80-year-old hope for a longer life than many would consider seemly."

=== Accolades ===
Love for Sale was nominated for Album of the Year, and won for Best Engineered Album, Non-Classical and Best Traditional Pop Vocal Album at the 64th Annual Grammy Awards. While its lead single, "I Get a Kick Out of You", was nominated for Record of the Year, Best Pop Duo/Group Performance and Best Music Video. With the nominations, Bennett made history as the oldest artist ever nominated in a general field category, and the second oldest nominee overall—Pinetop Perkins, at the age of 97, won the Grammy Award for Best Traditional Blues Album for his album Joined at the Hip (2010).

== Commercial performance ==
In the United States, Love for Sale landed at number eight on the Billboard 200 as the pair's second consecutive top-ten project in the country, following Cheek to Cheek, which debuted atop the chart in 2014. Individually, Love for Sale scored Gaga's tenth top-ten record on the Billboard 200, and the sixth of Bennett's career, with which, he marked the longest span of top-ten albums for any living artist, having earned his first one 59 prior with I Left My Heart in San Francisco (1962). However, the album marks Gaga's first studio album since The Fame (2008) to miss number 1 in the US. Love for Sale opened with 41,000 album-equivalent units, consisting of 38,000 sales, and 3,000 streaming units calculated from the 3.85 million on-demand streams the album received in its first week. The album topped the Traditional Jazz Albums and the overall Jazz Albums charts. On the Traditional Jazz Albums list Bennett broke the record for the most No. 1s in the 54-year history of the chart with 15 number one records, while on the latter chart Bennett reached the top for the tenth time tying him with Harry Connick Jr. for the third-most No. 1s since the list began in 1993. On the Canadian Albums Chart Love for Sale debuted at number 33 and departed the chart the next week. In the United Kingdom, the album debuted at number six on the UK Albums Chart while it reached number one on OCC's Jazz & Blues Albums chart. In Australia the album missed the top ten debuting at number eleven on the ARIA Albums Chart but reached the spot on the Australian Jazz & Blues Albums list. The record also opened at number one on the Jazz album charts of France and Sweden, while debuted in the top 5 on the overall album charts of Austria, Belgium (Wallonia region), Germany, Portugal, Scotland and Switzerland.

== Track listing ==
All songs from Love for Sale are written by Cole Porter and produced by Dae Bennett.

Love for Sale – Standard edition
| No. | Title | Length |
|---|---|---|
| 1. | "It's De-Lovely" | 2:53 |
| 2. | "Night and Day" | 3:42 |
| 3. | "Love for Sale" | 3:40 |
| 4. | "Do I Love You" (Gaga solo) | 4:48 |
| 5. | "I Concentrate on You" | 3:56 |
| 6. | "I Get a Kick Out of You" | 3:33 |
| 7. | "So in Love" (Bennett solo) | 4:31 |
| 8. | "Let's Do It" (Gaga solo) | 3:36 |
| 9. | "Just One of Those Things" (Bennett solo) | 2:59 |
| 10. | "Dream Dancing" | 4:16 |
| Total length: | | 36:00 |

Love for Sale – Digital, Target, and International deluxe editions
| No. | Title | Length |
|---|---|---|
| 1. | "It's De-Lovely" | 2:53 |
| 2. | "Night and Day" | 3:42 |
| 3. | "Love for Sale" | 3:40 |
| 4. | "Do I Love You" (Gaga solo) | 4:48 |
| 5. | "I've Got You Under My Skin" | 3:05 |
| 6. | "I Concentrate on You" | 3:56 |
| 7. | "I Get a Kick Out of You" | 3:33 |
| 8. | "So in Love" (Bennett solo) | 4:31 |
| 9. | "Let's Do It" (Gaga solo) | 3:36 |
| 10. | "Dream Dancing" | 4:16 |
| 11. | "Just One of Those Things" (Bennett solo) | 2:59 |
| 12. | "You're the Top" | 2:49 |
| Total length: | | 41:08 |

Love for Sale – Japanese deluxe edition bonus track
| No. | Title | Length |
|---|---|---|
| 13. | "Anything Goes" (Live from DC 2015) | 2:19 |
| Total length: | | 43:27 |

Love for Sale – International deluxe edition bonus audio CD - Cheek to Cheek Live!
| No. | Title | Writer(s) | Length |
|---|---|---|---|
| 1. | "Anything Goes" | Porter | 2:26 |
| 2. | "Cheek to Cheek" | Irving Berlin | 3:27 |
| 3. | "They All Laughed" | George Gershwin; Ira Gershwin | 2:00 |
| 4. | "The Lady's in Love with You" (Bennett solo) | Burton Lane; Frank Loesser | 1:52 |
| 5. | "Nature Boy" | eden ahbez | 4:17 |
| 6. | "Goody Goody" | Matt Malneck; John Mercer | 2:23 |
| 7. | "How Do You Keep the Music Playing?" (Bennett solo) | Alan Bergman; Marilyn Bergman; Michel Legrand | 4:51 |
| 8. | "Bang Bang (My Baby Shot Me Down)" (Gaga solo) | Sonny Bono | 4:43 |
| 9. | "Bewitched, Bothered and Bewildered" (Gaga solo) | Richard Rodgers; Lorenz Hart | 3:56 |
| 10. | "Firefly" | Cy Coleman; Carolyn Leigh | 2:05 |
| 11. | "I Won't Dance" | Dorothy Fields; Jimmy McHugh; Oscar Hammerstein II; Otto Harbach; Jerome Kern | 4:21 |
| 12. | "Don't Wait Too Long" (Bennett solo) | Sunny Skylar | 3:14 |
| 13. | "I Can't Give You Anything but Love" | Fields; McHugh | 3:41 |
| 14. | "Lush Life" (Gaga solo) | Billy Strayhorn | 5:06 |
| 15. | "Sophisticated Lady" (Bennett solo) | Edward Kennedy Ellington; Irving Mills; Mitchell Parish | 2:56 |
| 16. | "Let's Face the Music and Dance" | Berlin | 2:07 |
| 17. | "Ev'ry Time We Say Goodbye" (Gaga solo) | Porter | 3:57 |
| 18. | "But Beautiful" | Johnny Burke; Jimmy Van Heusen | 4:23 |
| 19. | "It Don't Mean a Thing" | Ellington; Mills | 2:43 |
| Total length: | | | 64:21 |

Love for Sale – Double vinyl box set edition bonus LP - Cheek to Cheek
| No. | Title | Writer(s) | Length |
|---|---|---|---|
| 1. | "Anything Goes" | Cole Porter | 2:04 |
| 2. | "Cheek to Cheek" | Irving Berlin | 2:51 |
| 3. | "Nature Boy" | eden ahbez | 4:08 |
| 4. | "I Can't Give You Anything but Love" | Dorothy Fields; Jimmy McHugh | 3:13 |
| 5. | "I Won't Dance" | Fields; McHugh; Oscar Hammerstein II; Otto Harbach; Jerome Kern | 3:57 |
| 6. | "Firefly" | Cy Coleman; Carolyn Leigh | 1:58 |
| 7. | "Lush Life" (Gaga solo) | Billy Strayhorn | 4:15 |
| 8. | "Sophisticated Lady" (Bennett solo) | Edward Kennedy Ellington; Irving Mills; Mitchell Parish | 3:49 |
| 9. | "Let's Face the Music and Dance" | Berlin | 2:07 |
| 10. | "But Beautiful" | Johnny Burke; Jimmy Van Heusen | 4:04 |
| 11. | "It Don't Mean a Thing (If It Ain't Got That Swing)" | Ellington; Mills | 2:24 |
| Total length: | | | 34:43 |

== Personnel ==
Musicians

- Tony Bennett – vocals (1–3, 5–8, 10–12)
- Lady Gaga – vocals (1–7, 9, 12)
- Steve Kortyka – alto saxophone (1, 3, 5–7, 9, 11, 12)
- Daniel Foose – bass (1, 6, 9, 12)
- Joe Peri – drums (1, 6, 9, 12)
- Alex Smith – organ, piano (1, 6, 9, 12)
- Brian Newman – trumpet (1, 6, 9, 12)
- Dan Krekeler – bass (2, 4, 8, 10)
- Jeremy McCoy – bass (2, 4, 8, 10)
- Marshall Wood – bass (2–5, 7, 8, 10)
- Peter Donovan – bass (2, 4, 8, 10)
- Timothy Cobb – bass (2, 4, 8, 10)
- William Short – bassoon (2, 4, 8, 10)
- Adele Stein – cello (2, 4, 8, 10)
- Clarice Jensen – cello (2, 4, 8, 10)
- Ellen Westermann – cello (2, 4, 8, 10)
- Julia Bruskin – cello (2, 4, 8, 10)
- Kari Docter – cello (2, 4, 8, 10)
- Peter Sanders – cello (2, 4, 8, 10)
- Jessica Phillips – clarinet (2, 4, 8, 10)
- Elena Barere – concert master (2), violin (2)
- Jorge Calandrelli – conductor (2, 4, 8, 10)
- Harold Jones – drums (2–5, 7)
- Diane Lesser – English horn (2, 4, 8, 10), oboe (2)
- John Romeri – flute (2, 4, 8, 10)
- Keith Bonner – flute (2, 4, 8, 10)
- Eric Reed – French horn (2, 4, 8, 10)
- Julia Pilant – French horn (2, 4, 8, 10)
- Stewart Rose – French horn (2, 4, 8, 10)
- William de Vos – French horn (2, 4, 8, 10)
- Gray Sargent – guitar (2–5, 7)
- Mariko Anraku – harp (2, 4, 8, 10)
- Tom Ranier – musical direction (2–5, 7)
- Erik Charlsto – percussion (2, 4, 8, 10)
- Steven White – percussion (2, 4, 8, 10)
- Jason Haaheim – timpani (2, 4, 8, 10)
- Caleb Burhans – viola (2, 4, 8, 10)
- David Gold – viola (2, 4, 8, 10)
- Desiree Elsevier – viola (2, 4, 8, 10)
- Dov Scheindlin – viola (2, 4, 8, 10)
- Katherine Anderson – viola (2, 4, 8, 10)
- Mary Hamman – viola (2, 4, 8, 10)
- Shmuel Katz – viola (2, 4, 8, 10)
- Todd Low – viola (2, 4, 8, 10)
- Amy Kauffman – violin (2, 4, 8, 10)
- Ann Lehman – violin (2, 4, 8, 10)
- Basia Danilow – violin (2, 4, 8, 10)
- Catherine Sim – violin (2, 4, 8, 10)
- Hae Young Ham – violin (2, 4, 8, 10)
- Jonathan Dinklage – violin (2, 4, 8, 10)
- Julia Ahyoung Choi – violin (2, 4, 8, 10)
- Katherine Fong – violin (2, 4, 8, 10)
- Kristi Helberg – violin (2, 4, 8, 10)
- Laura Frautschi – violin (2, 4, 8, 10)
- Laura McGinniss – violin (2, 4, 8, 10)
- Louise Owen – violin (2, 4, 8, 10)
- Margaret Gould – violin (2, 4, 8, 10)
- Maria Conti – violin (2, 4, 8, 10)
- Matthew Lehman – violin (2, 4, 8, 10)
- Nancy Wu – violin (2, 4, 8, 10)
- Robert Zubrycki – violin (2, 4, 8, 10)
- Sean Carney – violin (2, 4, 8, 10)
- Sylvia Danberg – violin (2, 4, 8, 10)
- Xiao-Dong Wang – violin (2, 4, 8, 10)
- Yurika Mok – violin (2, 4, 8, 10)
- Aaron Heick – alto saxophone (3, 5, 7, 11)
- David Mann – alto saxophone (3, 5, 7, 11)
- Roger Rosenberg – baritone saxophone (3, 5, 7, 11)
- Jeff Nelson – bass trombone (3, 5, 7, 11)
- Marion Evans – concert leader (3, 5, 7, 11)
- Charles Pillow – tenor saxophone (3, 5, 7, 11)
- Marc Phaneuf – tenor saxophone (3, 5, 7, 11)
- Michael Davis – trombone (3, 5, 7, 11)
- Nicholas Grinder – trombone (3, 5, 7, 11)
- Randy Andos – trombone (3, 5, 7, 11)
- Dylan Schwab – trumpet (3, 5, 7, 11)
- Jonathan Owens – trumpet (3, 5, 7, 11)
- Scott Wendholt – trumpet (3, 5, 7, 11)
- Tony Kadleck – trumpet (3, 5, 7, 11)

Technical

- Dae Bennett – production, mixing, engineering
- Greg Calbi – mastering
- Steve Fallone – mastering
- Billy Cumella – recording (1, 6, 9, 12)
- Josh Coleman – recording (2–5, 7, 8, 10, 11)
- Caitlyn Bogard – recording assistance (1, 6, 9, 12)
- Gosha Usov – recording assistance (1, 6, 9, 12)
- Roland Cespedes – recording assistance (2–5, 7, 8, 10, 11)
- Taylor Fuchs – recording assistance (2–5, 7, 8, 10, 11)

== Charts ==
=== Weekly charts ===
Weekly chart performance for Love for Sale
| Chart (2021) | Peak position |
|---|---|
| Australian Albums (ARIA) | 11 |
| Australian Jazz & Blues Albums (ARIA) | 1 |
| Austrian Albums (Ö3 Austria) | 4 |
| Belgian Albums (Ultratop Flanders) | 11 |
| Belgian Albums (Ultratop Wallonia) | 5 |
| Canadian Albums (Billboard) | 33 |
| Croatian International Albums (HDU) | 3 |
| Czech Albums (ČNS IFPI) | 28 |
| Dutch Albums (Album Top 100) | 10 |
| French Albums (SNEP) | 6 |
| French Top Albums Jazz (SNEP) | 1 |
| German Albums (Offizielle Top 100) | 5 |
| Greek Albums (IFPI) | 32 |
| Hungarian Albums (MAHASZ) | 34 |
| Irish Albums (Official Charts) | 24 |
| Italian Albums (FIMI) | 8 |
| Japan Hot Albums (Billboard Japan) | 29 |
| Japanese Albums (Oricon) | 32 |
| Polish Albums (ZPAV) | 7 |
| Portuguese Albums (AFP) | 3 |
| Scottish Albums (Official Charts) | 5 |
| Slovak Albums (ČNS IFPI) | 74 |
| Spanish Albums (Promusicae) | 12 |
| Swedish Jazz Albums (Sverigetopplistan) | 1 |
| Swiss Albums (Schweizer Hitparade) | 2 |
| UK Albums (Official Charts) | 6 |
| UK Jazz & Blues Albums (Official Charts) | 1 |
| US Billboard 200 | 8 |
| US Top Jazz Albums (Billboard) | 1 |
| US Traditional Jazz Albums (Billboard) | 1 |
| US Indie Store Album Sales (Billboard) | 2 |

=== Year-end charts ===
2021 year-end chart performance for Love for Sale
| Chart (2021) | Position |
|---|---|
| Australian Jazz and Blues Albums (ARIA) | 5 |
| Portuguese Albums (AFP) | 78 |
| US Jazz Albums (Billboard) | 9 |
| US Top Album Sales (Billboard) | 81 |

2022 year-end chart performance for Love for Sale
| Chart (2022) | Position |
|---|---|
| US Jazz Albums (Billboard) | 8 |
| US Top Album Sales (Billboard) | 79 |

== Release history ==
Release dates and formats for Love for Sale
| Region | Date | Format(s) | Edition(s) | Label(s) | Ref. |
|---|---|---|---|---|---|
| United States | September 30, 2021 | Cassette | Standard | Columbia; Interscope | |
| Various | October 1, 2021 | Box set; cassette; vinyl | Standard | Columbia; Interscope | |
| Various | October 1, 2021 | CD; digital download; streaming | Standard; deluxe | Columbia; Interscope | |
| Brazil | November 19, 2021 | CD | Standard | Universal Music Brasil | |
