= One Last Time: An Evening with Tony Bennett and Lady Gaga =

2021 television special

- Directed by: Alex Coletti
- Starring: Tony Bennett; Lady Gaga
- Country of origin: United States
- Original language: English

Production
- Executive producers: Alex Coletti; Bruce Gillmer; Jack Sussman; Danny Bennett; Bobby Campbell
- Producers: Allison Roithinger; Chris Vineyard; Jennifer Lebeau
- Production location: Radio City Music Hall
- Running time: 45 minutes

Original release
- Network: CBS
- Release: November 28, 2021

One Last Time: An Evening with Tony Bennett and Lady Gaga is a television special by American singers Tony Bennett and Lady Gaga. It originally aired on November 28, 2021, on CBS while being simulcast on Paramount+. Consisting of select duets and solo performances, it was part of the promotion of their second collaborative studio album, Love for Sale, released on September 30, 2021. A celebration of Bennett's 95th birthday, the special was recorded on August 3 and 5, 2021, when Bennett and Gaga presented a pair of shows at Radio City Music Hall in New York City. They were Bennett's final public performances, as he retired shortly after from performing live due to his health condition.

The duo was joined on stage by a 41-piece orchestra and musicians related to both artists. Before its release, backstage content of the shows were documented in CBS' television news magazine 60 Minutes, while their performance of "Anything Goes" broadcast on The Late Show with Stephen Colbert as a preview on November 23, 2021. When aired, the special was watched by 6.38 million viewers and had a positive critical response, receiving four nominations at the 74th Primetime Emmy Awards.

== Background and release ==
Tony Bennett and Lady Gaga first met in 2011 at the Robin Hood Foundation gala in New York City after Gaga's performance at the event. The meeting culminated in their first duet, "The Lady Is a Tramp", then their first collaborative album, Cheek to Cheek (2014), and multiple live performances together, including a concert tour.

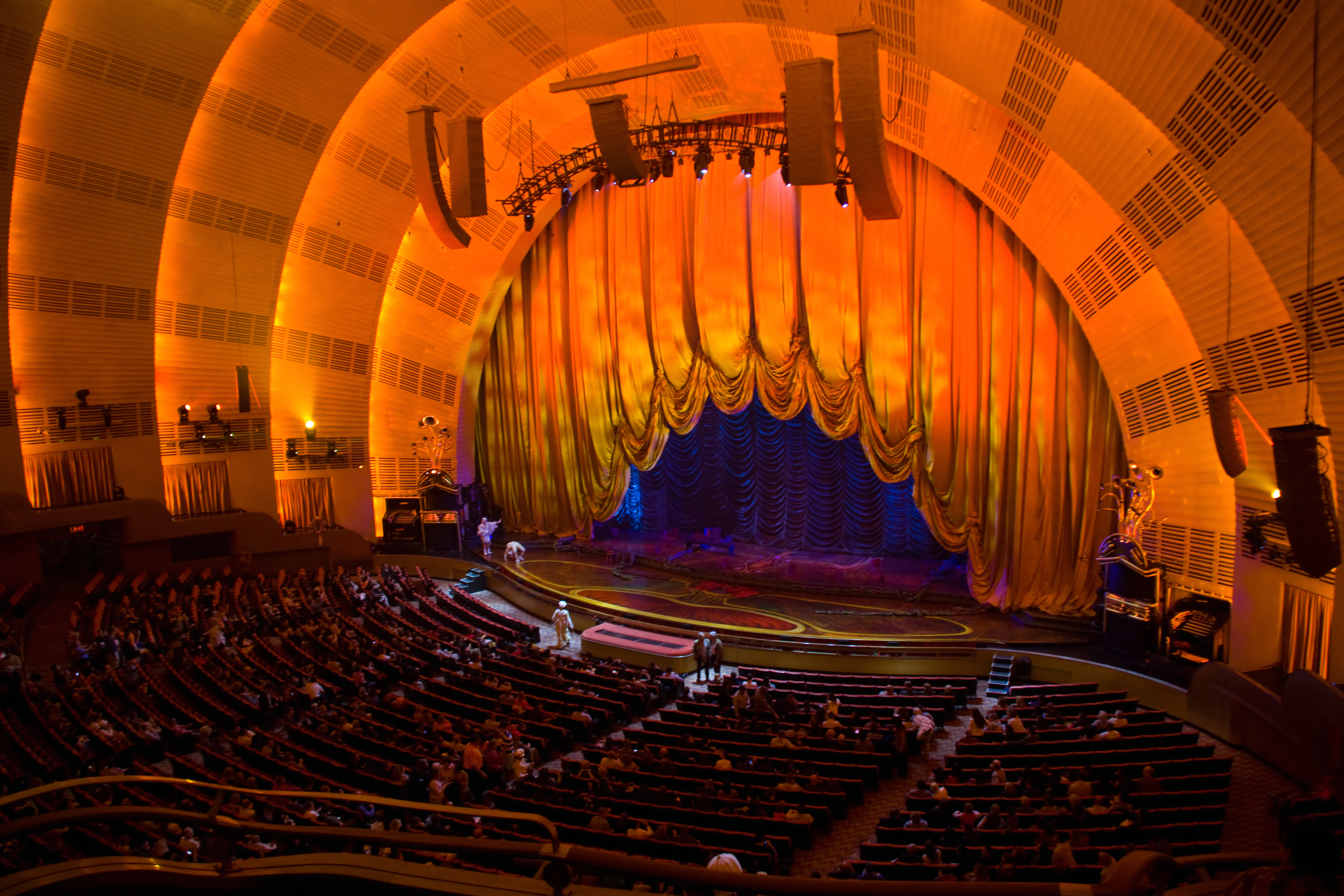
The shows were held at Radio City Music Hall in New York City.

In a statement, Darren Pfeffer, executive vice president of Madison Square Garden Entertainment, announced the duo's August 3 and 5, 2021, One Last Time double performance at Radio City Music Hall as an opportunity "to honor their decade long friendship and celebrate Mr. Bennett's 95th birthday." They were promoted as Bennett's final live performances in New York City, and later they were announced to be his final public performances of his career overall, as he retired from performing live on "doctors' orders". Bennett was diagnosed with Alzheimer's disease in 2016. Although he could remember all the songs, his family members were unsure what effect his condition would have on the shows. The preparation for the concerts were more challenging than the duo's previous ones, and Gaga had to keep communication with Bennett simple to make herself understood. After the first concert, Susan Benedetto, the singer's wife said that "once he saw the audience (...) and he raises his hands, (...) I knew we were alright because he became himself. He just turned on. You know, it was like a light switch."

In September 2021, it was announced that as part of the rollout for Bennett and Gaga's second and final collaborative album, Love for Sale, the duo partnered with ViacomCBS for three different specials. The first one was One Last Time, (Note: The other two being an appearance in MTV Unplugged and a documentary titled The Lady and the Legend; though the latter was ultimately delayed indefinitely.) the filmed rendering of the two concerts the pair did at Radio City Music Hall. Before the special debuted, the preparations and behind-the-scenes of the shows were documented in CBS' news magazine 60 Minutes, while the full performance of "Anything Goes" aired on The Late Show with Stephen Colbert as a preview on November 23, 2021. One Last Time simultaneously premiered on CBS and became available on streaming service Paramount+ on November 28, 2021.

== Synopsis ==
The special starts as Gaga appears on stage in a half crystal-embellished, half feathered dress with a dramatic slit. She performs "Luck Be a Lady" and enlists the audience in celebrating Bennett's 95th birthday. She then performs "Orange Colored Sky", a song Bennett heard her sing on the day they first met. After switching to a shiny, black "French maid-inspired cocktail" dress, she continues by performing "Let's Do It" from the duo's Cole Porter-tribute album Love for Sale, and recounts how Porter was a longtime inspiration for her. The song starts as a soft, piano rendition, before switching to a "rousing version". Before Gaga's final solo song, she encourages the audience to make Bennett smile and laugh, then dons a top hat and performs "New York, New York".

After a curtain drop, Bennett appears, leaning on his musical director Lee Musiker's piano, and performs "Watch What Happens" and "Steppin' Out with My Baby". His next number is a quiet, jazz guitar-plucked rendition of "Fly Me to the Moon". All of his solo performances end with the audience's standing ovation. Gaga rejoins Bennett in a gold sequin frock and matching capelet, and sings "Happy Birthday" to him with the audience. The two then perform "The Lady Is a Tramp", their first recorded duet from 2011. They return to the Cole Porter songbook with "Love for Sale" and "Anything Goes". Bennett then closes out with his signature song, "I Left My Heart in San Francisco". Gaga comes back on stage, and speaks to Bennett: "Tony, we're all so grateful to have witnessed your talent, your generosity, your creativity, and your kindness, and your service throughout all these years. Mr. Bennett, it would be my honor to escort you off the stage." The two then slowly leave together, with Bennett waving goodbye to the audience and the band playing them off.

== Reception ==
Writing for W Magazine, Andrea Whittle called the concert a "sparkly, campy, emotional night", and highlighted Bennett for being "remarkably commanding". Vulture's Hilary Hughes thought that the show was "miraculous, magnificent", and noted that despite his age and medical condition, Bennett's "vibrato rarely warbled off-pitch" and he "rolled through 17 songs in total, [...] with hardly a stumble over a single lyric". The Wall Street Journal's John Anderson opined that Bennett's "pitch may not be what it once was, but the sense of rhythm is undiminished, the timing is impeccable". While he called Gaga's dancing "sometimes awkward", he complimented her vocal skills and highlighted her visible "selflessness" towards her partner as one of core element to the show's success. Writing for USA Today, Patrick Ryan complimented both singers, saying that Gaga "was both sultry and sincere throughout her standards-filled set", and Bennett "was as spry and charismatic as ever". Johnny Loftus from Decider stated that the special is "both a fitting public farewell for a musical legend and a fun throwback to the golden age of live entertainment". One Last Time: An Evening with Tony Bennett and Lady Gaga attracted 6.38 million viewers and garnered a 0.44/3 rating in the 18–49 demographic during its original broadcast, on November 28, 2021.

== Awards and nominations ==
Award	Date of ceremony	Category	Recipient(s)	Result	Ref.
Primetime Emmy Awards	September 3, 2022	Outstanding Variety Special (Pre-Recorded)	Alex Coletti, Bruce Gillmer, Jack Sussman, Danny Bennett, and Bobby Campbell (executive producers); Gillian Appleby (supervising producer); Allison Roithinger, Chris Vineyard, and Jennifer Lebeau (producers); Lady Gaga and Tony Bennett (hosts)	Nominated	
Primetime Emmy Awards	September 3, 2022	Outstanding Lighting Design / Lighting Direction for a Variety Special	Leroy Bennett and Jason Baeri	Nominated	
Primetime Emmy Awards	September 3, 2022	Outstanding Music Direction	Michael Bearden and Lee Musiker	Nominated	
Primetime Emmy Awards	September 3, 2022	Outstanding Technical Direction, Camerawork, Video Control for a Special	Lori Gallati (technical director); Rob Balton, Jerry Cancel, Eli Clarke, Robert Del Russo, Dave Driscoll, Jay Kulick, Jeff Latonero, Lyn Noland, Mark Renaudin, Carlos Rios, Jim Scurti, Tim Quigley, and Dan Zadwarny (camera operators); J.M. Hurley (video control)	Nominated	

== Credits and personnel ==
Credits and personnel adapted from the concert special program.

- Tony Bennett – lead vocals
- Lady Gaga – lead vocals

Tony Bennett Quartet

- Lee Musiker – musical director, piano
- Harold Jones – drums
- Gray Sargent – guitar
- Marshall Wood – bass

Lady Gaga Quintet

- Brian Newman – band leader, trumpet
- Alex Smith – piano
- Daniel Foose – bass
- Steve Kortyka – saxophone
- Donald Barrett – drums

Orchestra

- Jill Dell'Abate – conductor
- Tia Allen – viola
- Caleb Burhans – viola
- Hayden Oliver – viola
- Yuko Naito – viola
- Randy Andos – bass trombone
- Mariko Anraku – harp
- Nuno Antunes – clarinet
- Philip Payton – violin
- Antoine Silverman – violin
- Hiroko Taguchi – violin
- Belinda Whitney – violin
- Laura Frautschi – violin
- Maggie Gould – violin
- Anna Luce – violin
- Hae Young Ham – violin
- Robin Braun – violin
- Sean Carney – violin
- Monica Davis – violin
- Fred Gnaman – violin
- Maxim Mostin – violin
- Chala Yancy – violin
- James Burton – trombone
- Darius Christian Jones – trombone
- Mike Davis – trombone
- Braxton Cook – alto sax/flute
- Brandon George Patrick – flute
- Kim Lewis – flute
- David Finck – bass
- Frank Greene – trumpet
- Tony Kadleck – trumpet
- Brandon Lee – trumpet
- Jon Owens – trumpet
- Aaron Heick – alto sax/oboe
- Emily Bruausa – cello
- Clarice Jensen – cello
- Adele Stein – cello
- Diane Lesser – oboe
- Dave Mann – tenor sax/flute
- Dave Riekenberg – bari sax/bass clarinet
- Andy Snitzer – tenor sax/clarinet

Production

- Alex Coletti – director
- Allison Roithinger – producer
- Gillian Appleby – supervising producer
- Chris Vineyard – producer
- Jennifer Lebeau – producer
- Leroy Bennett – production and lighting designer
- Dae Bennett – music mixing and editing
- Michael Bearden – conductor and musical director
- Lizz Zanin – associate director
- Julie Lorusso – associate director
- Benny Almonte – stage manager
- Steven Van Patten – stage manager
- Mari Keiko Gonzalez – editor
- Guy Harding – editor
- Bales Karlin – production manager
