= Jack Eskew =

Jackson Whiteside Eskew Kenmore (June 29, 1940 – February 6, 2016), known professionally as Jack Eskew, was an American arranger and orchestrator based in Los Angeles, California. He studied music at the University of Southern California before beginning his career in the early 1960s by touring the United States as a trumpeter with various bands, most prominently with Harry James.

Later in the 1960s, he led the band at Disneyland that appeared nightly in the famous subterranean rising stage, playing trumpet and piano. He subsequently became music director at Disneyland. During the 1960s and '70s, he musically supervised such television shows as the classic The Banana Splits Adventure Hour, The Sonny and Cher Show, and The Mac Davis Show.

From the early 1980s, Eskew worked with Oscar-winning film composer Bill Conti (best known for his scores of the Rocky series and The Right Stuff) and subsequently orchestrated The Karate Kid series, Baby Boom, Betrayed, A Prayer for the Dying, Broadcast News, The Addams Family, Rookie of the Year, Huckleberry Finn, The Big Blue, the Pierce Brosnan remake of The Thomas Crown Affair, Spy Hard, 8 Seconds, and Rocky Balboa, among others. Continuing his long collaboration with Conti, Eskew also orchestrated numerous telecasts of the annual Academy Awards with Conti serving at the helm as musical director and on-air conductor.

Eskew was nominated three times for an Emmy Award, sharing with Conti the 1994 winning award for Outstanding Individual Achievement in Music Direction, The 64th Annual Academy Awards.
