= Ian Fraser (composer) =

English composer, conductor, orchestrator, arranger and music director

Ian Fraser (23 August 1933 – 31 October 2014) was an English composer, conductor, orchestrator, arranger and music director. In a career that spanned over 50 years, he received eleven Emmy Awards out of 32 total nominations, making him the most-honored musician in television history. His first 23 Emmy nominations, received between 1977 and 1999, were consecutive, which is the longest run of individual nominations in the history of the Academy of Television Arts & Sciences.

His professional associations were with such artists as actress-singer Julie Andrews, singer-songwriter Anthony Newley and composer-lyricist Leslie Bricusse. In addition to his many Emmy Awards and nominations, he received Academy Award and Golden Globe Award nominations as conductor and supervisor of Bricusse's score for the 1970 musical film Scrooge.

== Early life and career ==
Fraser was born in Hove, England, on 23 August 1933. He attended Eastbourne College between 1945 and 1951. He served for five years in the British Armed Forces and performed as a solo concert pianist, harpist and percussionist with the Royal Artillery Band.

Fraser met Anthony Newley while working at Decca Records in the 1950s and was hired as arranger and musical director of Newley and Leslie Bricusse's new stage musical, Stop the World – I Want to Get Off. The show was a hit upon its opening on West End in 1961, and when it transferred to Broadway the following year, Fraser went with it.

== Subsequent collaborations with Bricusse, Newley and Julie Andrews ==
After Stop the World – I Want to Get Off ended its Broadway run in 1964, Fraser decided to continue residing in the United States, though he would frequently return to England for work. Living in New York City, he again worked with Bricusse on the musical Pickwick, which, like Stop the World, had transferred to Broadway from West End. After Pickwick closed in November 1965, Fraser relocated to Los Angeles.

He re-teamed with both Bricusse and Newley on the 1967 musical film Doctor Dolittle, the aforementioned Scrooge, and Hallmark Hall of Fame's 1976 TV musical Peter Pan. He also collaborated with Bricusse on the 1986 TV movie Babes in Toyland.

His professional relationship with Julie Andrews began in 1972 when he was hired as vocal arranger for The Julie Andrews Hour. His many collaborations with Andrews since then have included five television specials, two Christmas albums (1973's Christmas with Julie Andrews and 1990's The Sounds of Christmas From Around the World), the 45th Tony Awards in 1991, two Grammy Award-nominated Broadway albums (1995's Broadway: The Music of Richard Rodgers and 1997's Broadway: Here I'll Stay - The Words of Alan Jay Lerner), and Broadway's Victor/Victoria, which also re-teamed Fraser with Bricusse.

== Other notable works ==
Fraser was the musical director for Bing Crosby's last Christmas special, Bing Crosby's Merrie Olde Christmas (1977), making him the last person to conduct the holiday classic "White Christmas" for Crosby. He also co-wrote the song "Peace on Earth" as a counterpoint to "The Little Drummer Boy" for David Bowie to sing during a famed duet with Crosby.

His other career highlights include having served as musical director for the 36th, 45th and 54th Primetime Emmy Awards as well as the 56th Academy Awards, six entries in the AFI 100 Years... series of specials and numerous Christmas in Washington TV specials between 1984 and 2012. Fourteen of his Emmy nominations were for the latter programs, with his having won for the 1984 and 1988 specials.

== Death ==
Fraser died of cancer at his home in Los Angeles, California, on October 31, 2014. He was 81. He left his great nephew, Oscar Sawyer.
