= Bob Alberti =

American pianist (born 1934)

Bob Alberti (born 1934 in Brooklyn, New York), is an American pianist. He attended P.S. 185 and Fort Hamilton High School, both in the Bay Ridge section of Brooklyn. His paternal family was a long line of musicians beginning with the Alberti Family Orchestra, seven people including his Great-Grandparents and their five offspring, all of whom were accomplished musicians. His father was an orchestra leader in the 1930s so it naturally led him into a life in the music industry.

His mentor was jazz pianist Teddy Wilson, with whom he studied at a young age. He formed his first little combo at age 14 and that group played at restaurants and associations in the New York area. At age 16 he joined Charlie Spivak's orchestra, one of the "name bands" of the day. From there he also played with the bands of Louis Prima, Jerry Gray and Les Brown (at a later time on the West Coast.) While still in New York he formed a jazz trio and played in Greenwich Village nightclubs. For a period of about five years he was actively playing with the "society bands" of the New York area, playing weddings, debutante parties and all sorts of various engagements.

In 1960 Alberti decided to try the music scene in the Los Angeles area, which was growing rapidly as the new hub of television production. He served as personal musical director for stars of the era that included Paul Anka, Johnny Mathis, Jack Jones, Patti Page, Shari Lewis, Kay Starr and many others. Eventually he spent thirty-four years as a studio musician, playing piano, arranging and conducting for major productions. He was the alternate pianist on "The Tonight Show Starring Johnny Carson" from 1974 to 1983, and handled the music for the Bob Hope Shows at NBC until he chose to retire from the active music business in Los Angeles and move to Hilton Head Island, South Carolina. During that time he also served as musical director on "Name That Tune," a game show, as well as supplying music for numerous situation comedies and variety shows. He was twice nominated for an Emmy award for musical direction.

After leaving California, Alberti managed to continue his musical career by returning to his roots, that being the world of jazz piano. He was tapped (in retirement) to be the accompanist for Steve Lawrence and Eydie Gorme and spent five years in that capacity (until 2002.) In 1996 he was named as music coordinator for Dolphin Recording Studios of Hilton Head, South Carolina. He wrote an autobiography titled, "Up The Ladder and Over The Top: Memoirs of a Hollywood Studio Musician" in 2003. He still manages to keep active in local jazz venues and occasionally still gets called to play on recording sessions for various artists in the southeast quadrant of the country. Alberti has recorded six CDs with his own groups.
