= Do I Love You? =

1939 popular song by Cole Porter

Song
- Published: 1939 by Chappell & Co.
- Songwriter: Cole Porter

"Do I Love You?" is a 1939 popular song written by Cole Porter, for his musical Du Barry Was a Lady, where it was introduced by Ronald Graham and Ethel Merman.

The song was included in the 1943 film adaptation of the musical, where it was sung by Gene Kelly.

== Notable recordings ==
- Leo Reisman & His Orchestra (vocal by Lee Sullivan). This was a popular recording in 1940.
- Vera Lynn - recorded on May 8, 1941 with the Jay Wilbur Orchestra. (Decca F 7863) (included in the 2014 compilation National Treasure – The Ultimate Collection).
- Ella Fitzgerald – Ella Fitzgerald Sings the Cole Porter Songbook (1956)
- Judy Garland – Judy in Love (1958)
- Larry Hovis – single (1958)
- Peggy Lee – first recorded for Decca Records on April 3, 1956 and later recorded for the Capitol Records album Beauty and the Beat! (1959)
- Frankie Vaughan – for the album Warm Feeling (1961)
- Aztec Camera – Red Hot + Blue (1990)
- Lady Gaga recorded a version of the song for her 2021 collaborative album with Tony Bennett, Love for Sale.
