= Bruce Gillmer =

American film producer

- Education: Indiana State University
- Occupations: film and television producer
- Years active: 1987 - present

Bruce Gillmer (born August 6, 1963) is an American television producer/music executive known for executive producing the MTV Europe Music Awards, often called the EMAs, in 2008 to 2024, as well as other music and entertainment events and award shows.

== Career ==
Gillmer got his start as a Talent Coordinator for MTV in 1987, working on shows like Yo! MTV Raps, Headbangers Ball, The Jon Stewart Show and MTV Spring Break. He was then promoted to Senior Vice President of Music and Talent Relations for VH1, where he led the Music and Talent department on all music-driven shows, events and initiatives. Gillmer was deeply involved with the development and production of VH1 Divas, VH1 Hip Hop Honors, VH1 Fashion Awards, Behind the Music, The Concert for New York City, and a variety of other shows, series and events.

Bruce Gillmer later became Executive Vice President of Talent and Music Programming / Events for Viacom International Media Networks (VIMN), where he led strategic partnerships within the international music industry and was responsible for music and celebrity talent participation around international programming and events, including the MTV EMAs, the Mnet Asian Music Awards, the VMAJs and MTV World Stage.

== Filmography ==
- Where Are They Now? on VH1 - 2000
- VH1 Divas Duets - 2003
- Aftermath: The Station Fire Five Years Later - 2008
- MTV Europe Music Awards 2011 - 2011
- MTV Europe Music Awards 2012 - 2012
- MTV Europe Music Awards 2013 - 2013
- MTV Europe Music Awards 2014 - 2014
- MTV Europe Music Awards 2015 - 2015
