= Christmas in Washington =

Christmas TV special

Christmas in Washington was an annual Christmas television special that originated on NBC and later aired on TNT. It ended in 2015 after a 33-year run.

== Background ==
One of two annual holiday specials produced by George Stevens Jr. (the other being the Kennedy Center Honors), the variety show first aired in 1982 on NBC before moving to its most recent home on TNT in 1998. Recorded in Washington, D.C. at the National Building Museum, on the second Sunday of each December before being re-edited for later broadcast, Christmas in Washington is a one-hour concert featuring artists from musical genres. Each guest performs at least one solo, but the prominent marquee performer usually has one or two more songs. The show sometimes had at least one guest from the world of opera. Each of the musical performances are backed by a full orchestra and chorus. The show's finale consisted of a medley performed by all the musical guests before the attendees-of-honor, the President of the United States and the First Lady, make a closing statement followed by the singing of "Hark! The Herald Angels Sing".

Recent events have benefited Children's National Medical Center.

== Host and performers ==
From 2004 to 2008, the show was hosted by Dr. Phil and his wife, Robin. However, since 2009 and for the remainder of its most recent run, the show had a single host. The 2013 edition featured Hugh Jackman as host and The Backstreet Boys as marquee performers, marking the first time in six years that a group has been featured as marquee performers. The show aired live on pay-per-view internationally and in most major cities, after which a re-edited 42-minute version (with commercials in a one-hour slot) aired on network television.

== Cancellation ==
In 2015, shortly after the Stevens' production company sold the rights to their companion program, the Kennedy Center Honors, the special was cancelled after being unable to find a new network or presenting sponsor as TNT had declined to renew the show after the 2014 edition.

== Editions ==
The marquee performer is marked in bold.

Year	Host	Performers
1982	Dinah Shore	**Dinah Shore**; Diahann Carroll; John Schneider; Debby Boone; Ben Vereen; Shiloh Baptist Church Choir; United States Naval Academy Glee Club
1983	Andy Williams	**Andy Williams**; Julio Iglesias; Leslie Uggams; United States Naval Academy Glee Club
1984	Hal Linden	**The Osmonds**; Frederica von Stade; Nell Carter; United States Naval Academy Glee Club
1985	Tom Brokaw	**Pat Boone**; Natalie Cole; Amy Grant; United States Naval Academy Glee Club
1986	John Forsythe	**Mac Davis**; Sandi Patty; Shiloh Baptist Church Choir; United States Naval Academy Glee Club
1987	Barbara Mandrell	**Barbara Mandrell**; Marilyn McCoo; Jack Jones; Vienna Boys' Choir; United States Naval Academy Glee Club
1988	James Stewart	**Vikki Carr**; Shirley Jones; Kathleen Battle; Gary Morris; Eastern High School Choir; United States Naval Academy Glee Club
1989	Olivia Newton-John	**Olivia Newton-John**; Diahann Carroll; Vic Damone; Sir James Galway; Michael W. Smith; Take 6; Eastern High School Choir; United States Naval Academy Glee Club
1990	John Denver	**John Denver**; Reba McEntire; Aretha Franklin; Eastern High School Choir; United States Naval Academy Glee Club
1991	—N/a	**Anita Baker**; Vince Gill; Johnny Mathis; Anne Murray; Gregory Jefferson; Eastern High School Choir
1992	Julie Andrews	**Peabo Bryson**; Neil Diamond; Midori; United States Naval Academy Glee Club; Soul Children of Chicago
1993	Kirstie Alley	**Mary Chapin Carpenter**; Patti LaBelle; Wynton Marsalis; Aaron Neville; Ricky Van Shelton; United States Naval Academy Glee Club; Eastern High School Choir
1994	Helen Hunt	**Anita Baker**; Kenny G; Kathy Mattea; Tim McGraw; Jon Secada; Sounds of Blackness; United States Naval Academy Glee Club; Eastern High School Choir
1995	Kelsey Grammer; David Hyde Pierce; Jane Leeves; Peri Gilpin; John Mahoney	**Clint Black**; Gloria Estefan; Al Green; Dawn Upshaw; United States Naval Academy Glee Club; Eastern High School Choir
1996	John Lithgow; Joseph Gordon-Levitt; Kristen Johnston; French Stewart; Jane Curtin	**Luther Vandross**; Faith Hill; CeCe Winans; Ruth Ann Swenson; United States Naval Academy Glee Club; Eastern High School Choir
1997	Glenn Close	**Hanson**; Deana Carter; Aaliyah; Shirley Caesar; Thomas Hampson; United States Naval Academy Glee Club; Eastern High School Choir
1998	Brooke Shields	**Kenny Loggins**; Martina McBride; Smokey Robinson; Harolyn Blackwell; Eastern High School Choir
1999	Brendan Fraser	**Christina Aguilera**; B.B. King; Jewel; 98 Degrees; United States Naval Academy Glee Club
2000	Sarah Michelle Gellar	**Marc Anthony**; Chuck Berry; Jessica Simpson; The Corrs; Billy Gilman
2001	Reba McEntire	**Tony Bennett**; Charlotte Church; Mandy Moore; Usher
2002	Katie Holmes	**Brooks & Dunn**; Alison Krauss; The Brian Setzer Orchestra; Yolanda Adams
2003	Patricia Heaton	**Ashanti**; Kenny Chesney; Joss Stone; Renée Fleming
2004	Phil McGraw and Robin McGraw	**LeAnn Rimes**; JoJo; Vanessa Williams; Ruben Studdard
2005	Phil McGraw and Robin McGraw	**Rascal Flatts**; Carrie Underwood; Ciara; Jane Monheit; The Click Five; CeCe Winans
2006	Phil McGraw and Robin McGraw	**Taylor Hicks**; Il Divo; Gretchen Wilson; Chris Brown; Corinne Bailey Rae; Bianca Ryan
2007	Phil McGraw and Robin McGraw	**Katharine McPhee**; **Ne-Yo**; **Vanessa Hudgens**; Alan Jackson; Colbie Caillat; Heather Headley; Andrea Bocelli
2008	Phil McGraw and Robin McGraw	**Casting Crowns**; **Julianne Hough**; Kristin Chenoweth; Darius Rucker; Straight No Chaser
2009	George Lopez	**Mary J. Blige**; Neil Diamond; Sugarland; Rob Thomas; Usher; Justin Bieber
2010	Ellen DeGeneres	**Mariah Carey**; Miranda Cosgrove; Andrea Bocelli; Annie Lennox; Maxwell; Matthew Morrison
2011	Conan O'Brien	**Justin Bieber**; CeeLo Green; The Band Perry; Jennifer Hudson; Victoria Justice
2012	Conan O'Brien	**Diana Ross**; Demi Lovato; Megan Hilty; Scotty McCreery; Chris Mann; Psy
2013	Hugh Jackman	**Backstreet Boys**; Sheryl Crow; Anna Kendrick; Janelle Monáe; Pat Monahan
2014	Dwayne Johnson	**Darius Rucker**; Aloe Blacc; Christina Perri; Hunter Hayes; Rita Ora
