= Cheek to Cheek Tour =

2014–15 concert tour by Tony Bennett and Lady Gaga

- Tour by Tony Bennett and Lady Gaga
- Cheek to Cheek Tour poster lithograph
- Location: Europe; North America
- Associated album: Cheek to Cheek
- Start date: December 30, 2014
- End date: August 1, 2015
- Legs: 5
- No. of shows: 36
- Box office: US $15.3 million ($20.78 million in 2025 dollars)
Tony Bennett tour chronology
Tony Bennett Live in Concert (2014)	Cheek to Cheek Tour (2014–2015)
Lady Gaga tour chronology
ArtRave: The Artpop Ball (2014)	Cheek to Cheek Tour (2014–2015)	Dive Bar Tour (2016)

The Cheek to Cheek Tour was a co-headlining concert tour by American singers Tony Bennett and Lady Gaga in support of their collaborative jazz album, Cheek to Cheek (2014). Serving as Bennett's final tour, it began with two performances at The Cosmopolitan in Paradise, Nevada, on December 30 and 31, 2014, and ended at the Kennedy Center in Washington, D.C., on August 1, 2015. It comprised 36 performances across North America and Europe, including appearances at the Ravinia Festival, Copenhagen Jazz Festival, Montreux Jazz Festival, and Gent Jazz Festival.

Bennett and Gaga planned the tour around comparatively intimate venues and jazz festivals, departing from the large-scale arenas of Gaga's previous tours. Onstage, they performed jazz standards as duets and solo numbers, accompanied by the Tony Bennett Quartet and the Brian Newman Quintet. The presentation featured a restrained stage design with a crystal curtain, alongside Gaga's multiple costume changes. Reviews were largely positive, highlighting the singers' rapport and contrasting vocal styles, although some critics questioned particular performances or the frequency of Gaga's costume changes. Demand for tickets prompted the addition of several dates. According to Pollstar, the tour grossed $15.3 million from 27 reported North American shows, drawing 176,267 attendees.

== Background ==
In September 2012, American jazz singer Tony Bennett confirmed to Rolling Stone that he would record and release a jazz album with singer Lady Gaga. On July 29, 2014, the duo appeared on Today to formally announce their collaboration, titled Cheek to Cheek, with the release date in the United States as September 23, 2014. Following the announcement of the release, a mini concert was held at the Rose Theater of Lincoln Center for the Performing Arts. Titled Tony Bennett and Lady Gaga: Cheek to Cheek Live!, the concert aired on PBS on October 24, 2014, and a DVD of the performance was released on January 20, 2015. In November 2014, Gaga completed ArtRave: The Artpop Ball, a concert tour supporting her third studio album, Artpop (2013).

After promoting Cheek to Cheek through television appearances, live performances, and advertising campaigns, Bennett confirmed plans for the duo to perform at jazz festivals in 2015 in support of the album. Bennett said Gaga was tired of playing large venues and wanted a more intimate setting. Having regularly performed in concert halls and outdoor theaters himself, he explained that Gaga had been looking for venues of that kind.

== Development ==
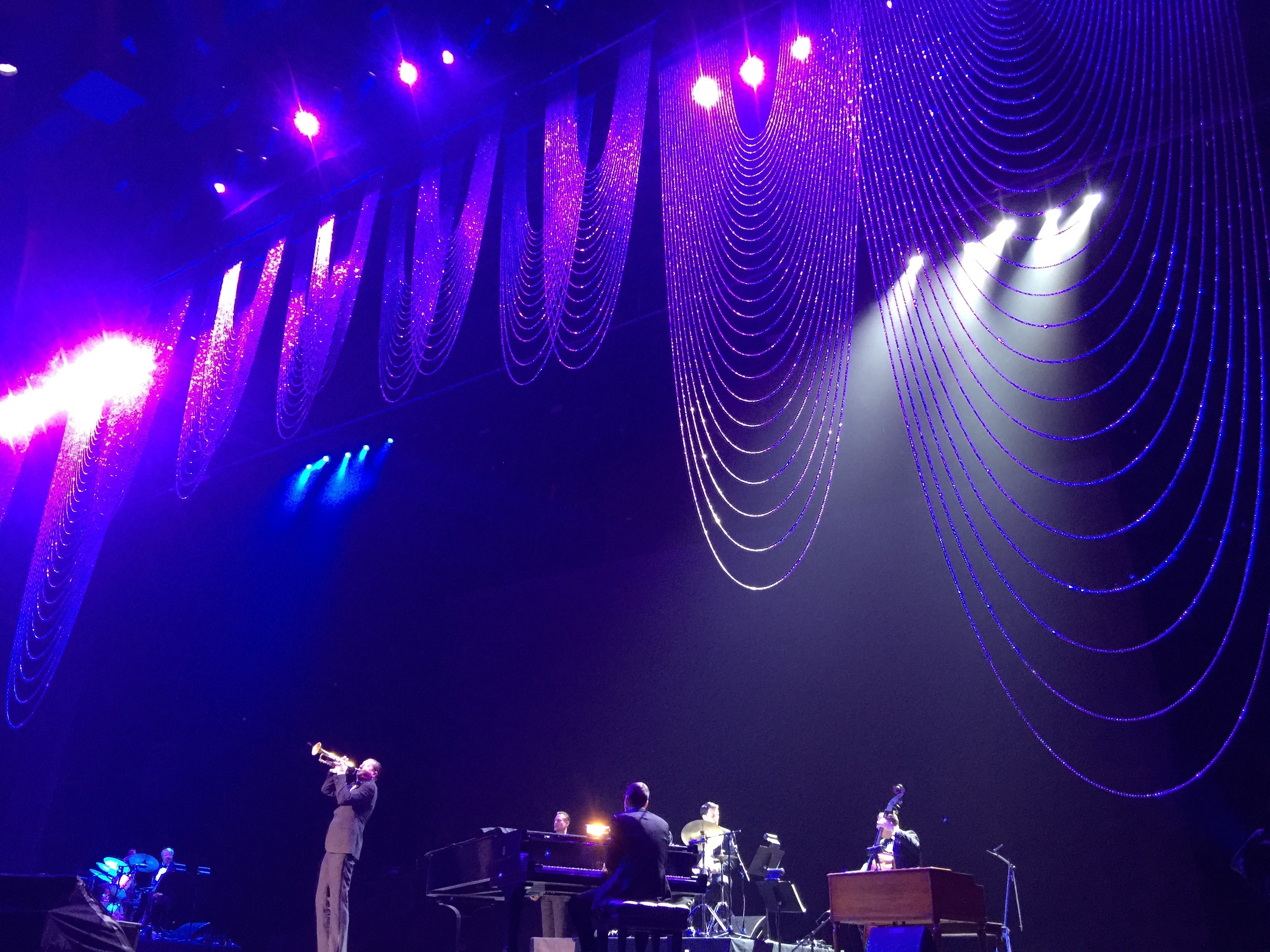
The tour stage with the crystal curtain and the orchestra beneath them

The duo opened the tour with performances at The Cosmopolitan in Paradise, Nevada, on December 30 and 31, 2014. They performed at the 57th Annual Grammy Awards on February 8, 2015, and staged a post-Grammy concert that evening at the Wiltern Theatre in Los Angeles. Further dates were announced for the Hollywood Bowl in Los Angeles on May 30, the Royal Albert Hall in London on June 8, and Radio City Music Hall in New York City on June 19. Many of the tour's shows were part of music festivals, such as the Ravinia Festival, the Copenhagen Jazz Festival, the North Sea Jazz Festival, and the Gent Jazz Festival. In addition to the scheduled tour dates, the duo performed at a fundraiser supporting Hillary Clinton's presidential campaign at the Plaza Hotel in New York.

The stage was simply decorated with a crystal curtain. Production and lighting designer LeRoy Bennett, who had worked on several of Gaga's previous tours and performances, sought to balance Tony Bennett's traditional stage presentation with Gaga's theatrical style. He described the production as "a very stripped down show", featuring soft pink, blue and purple lighting and a minimalist design influenced by theater director Robert Wilson. LeRoy Bennett also noted Gaga's involvement from the early stages of planning the show's visual presentation.

For the preceding television special Tony Bennett and Lady Gaga: Cheek to Cheek Live!, Gaga's stylist Brandon Maxwell and his team had developed a wardrobe for Gaga and the dancers in consultation with Wilson on the set and lighting designs. Maxwell said the team considered hundreds of dresses before narrowing their selection to eight outfits. The styling favored flowing gowns that would not restrict Gaga's breathing while she sang, as well as colors such as teal and turquoise. It also featured a leather jumpsuit made by David Samuel Menkes and footwear by designers including Brian Atwood, Stuart Weitzman, and Sophia Webster. During the tour, Gaga wore a revealing halter dress that she called her "naked dress". For her performance of "La Vie en rose", Gaga wore a pink dress featuring an oversized bow, designed by her younger sister Natali Germanotta in collaboration with costume designer Perry Meek. Bennett was accompanied by the Tony Bennett Quartet, which included Mike Renzi, and Gaga by the Brian Newman Quintet.

== Critical response ==
The Cheek to Cheek Tour received highly positive reviews, with critics frequently commenting on the interplay between Bennett's traditional vocal style and Gaga's theatrical approach. Reviewing the opening shows in Las Vegas, Marc Graser of Variety called the singers "perfect dance partners", praising both their voices and the effectiveness of a staging largely limited to crystal-studded curtains. Mark Adams of Las Vegas Weekly declared that "every performance was flawless" and wrote that, despite their considerable age difference, the two performers were equally accomplished and made a convincing partnership. Ashley Lee of The Hollywood Reporter described Bennett as commanding and Gaga as comparatively restrained, emphasizing the elegance of their interpretations of jazz standards. Reviewing their Vancouver appearance, The Vancouver Sun praised their rapport and called Gaga a "born entertainer".

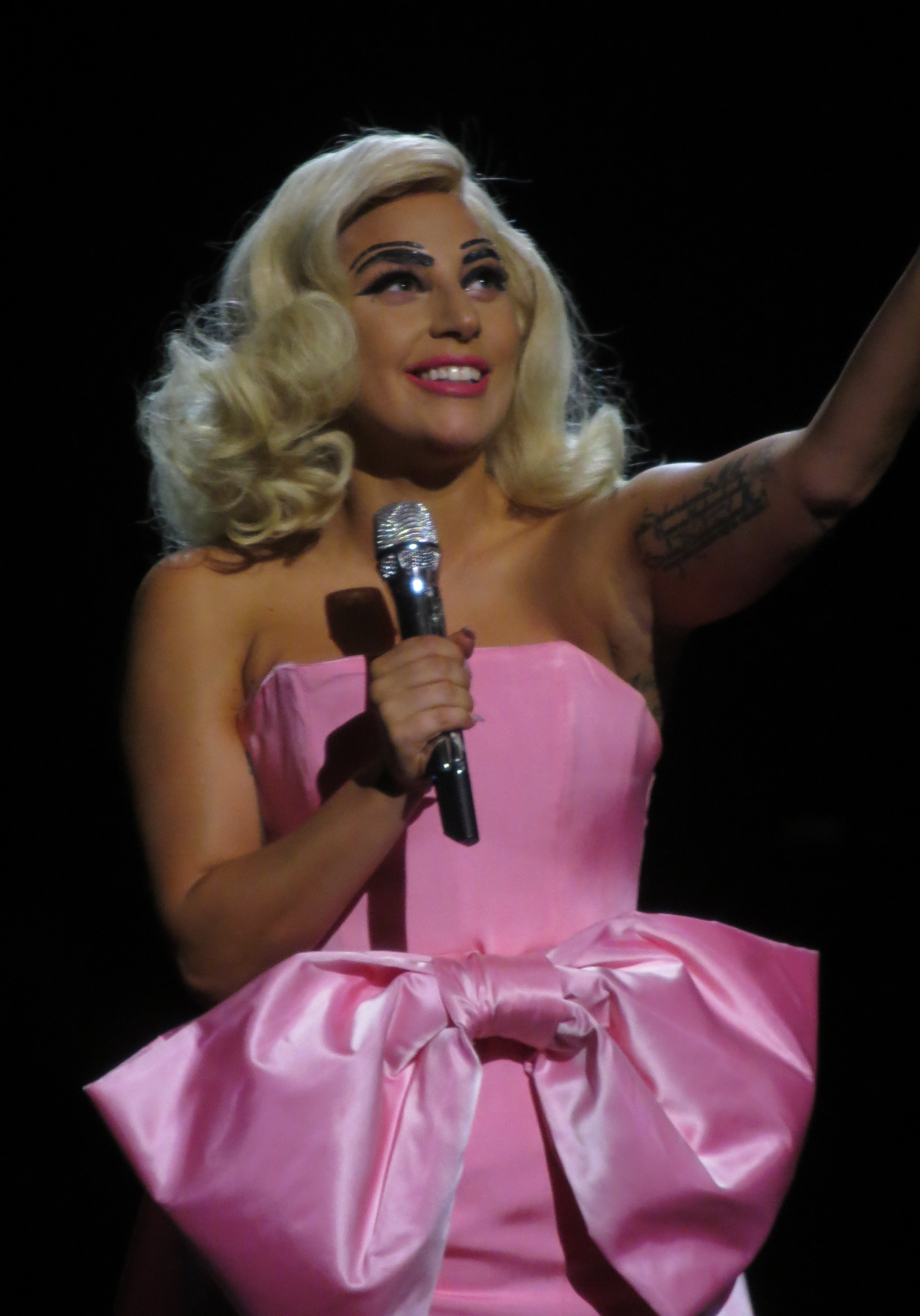
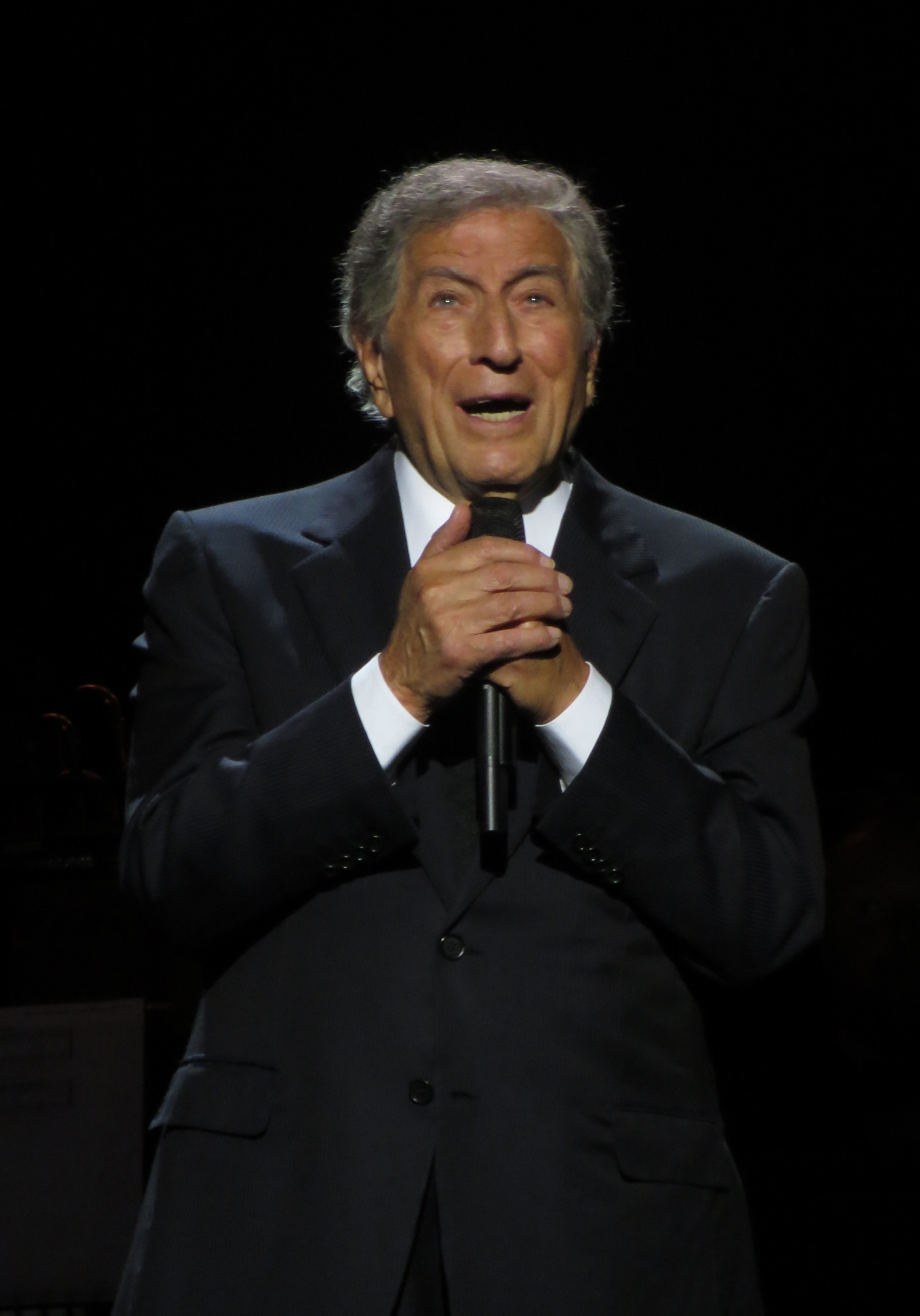
Gaga (left) and Bennett (right) during their respective solo performances on the tour. Critics praised their vocal abilities, with several highlighting their individual performances.

Stuart Derdeyn of The Seattle Times offered a more qualified assessment of the singers' voices, noting occasional imperfections but praising their individual numbers and the audience's enthusiastic response. He jokingly compared the many standing ovations to "an aerobics class for the well-dressed". Jim Harrington of the San Jose Mercury News similarly considered their solo performances more engaging than the duets. Although he remarked on Gaga's penchant for spectacle, he also praised her singing and ability to hold her own alongside Bennett. At the Hollywood Bowl, Denny Directo of Entertainment Tonight praised the pair's musical chemistry, describing Gaga as "born to perform the American Songbook" and celebrating Bennett's enduring vocal ability. Barry Brecheisen of the Orange County Register was less impressed. He felt that Gaga held back vocally during the duets and that her repeated costume changes disrupted the show's momentum; nevertheless, he considered her solo performances its strongest moments, calling them the "evening's standouts".

The tour's second scheduled concert at London's Royal Albert Hall was canceled after Bennett contracted influenza, leaving the first performance to be reviewed by the British press. Neil McCormick of The Daily Telegraph gave that show four out of five stars, praising the performers' warmth toward one another and finding their emotional connection particularly effective in ballads such as "Nature Boy". Caroline Sullivan of The Guardian also awarded four stars. She highlighted the duets "I Can't Give You Anything but Love", "Nature Boy", and "I Won't Dance", alongside Gaga's solo performances of "La Vie en rose" and "Bang Bang". In another four-star review, Ludovic Hunter-Tilney of the Financial Times praised Bennett's singing but found Gaga especially compelling when performing alone, writing that her solo numbers "stole the show".

Reviewing the first of the four Radio City Music Hall concerts in New York, Jim Farber of the New York Daily News emphasized the performers' humor, easy exchanges and lively rapport. Stephen Holden of The New York Times praised the quality of their vocals while drawing a distinction between "Gaga's bright, saucy Broadway-trained voice" and Bennett's "mature saloon style". He considered the differences in their approaches an important part of the concert's appeal. Howard Reich of the Chicago Tribune likewise praised their ability to connect across generations, writing that they "all but erased the decades separating them". Reviewing an Atlantic City performance, Joe Lynch of Billboard awarded the concert four stars, singling out Gaga's solo performances of "Bang Bang" and "La Vie en rose" as particularly effective showcases for her voice. At the end of the year, Vulture ranked the Cheek to Cheek Tour first on its list of the ten best concerts of 2015.

== Commercial reception ==
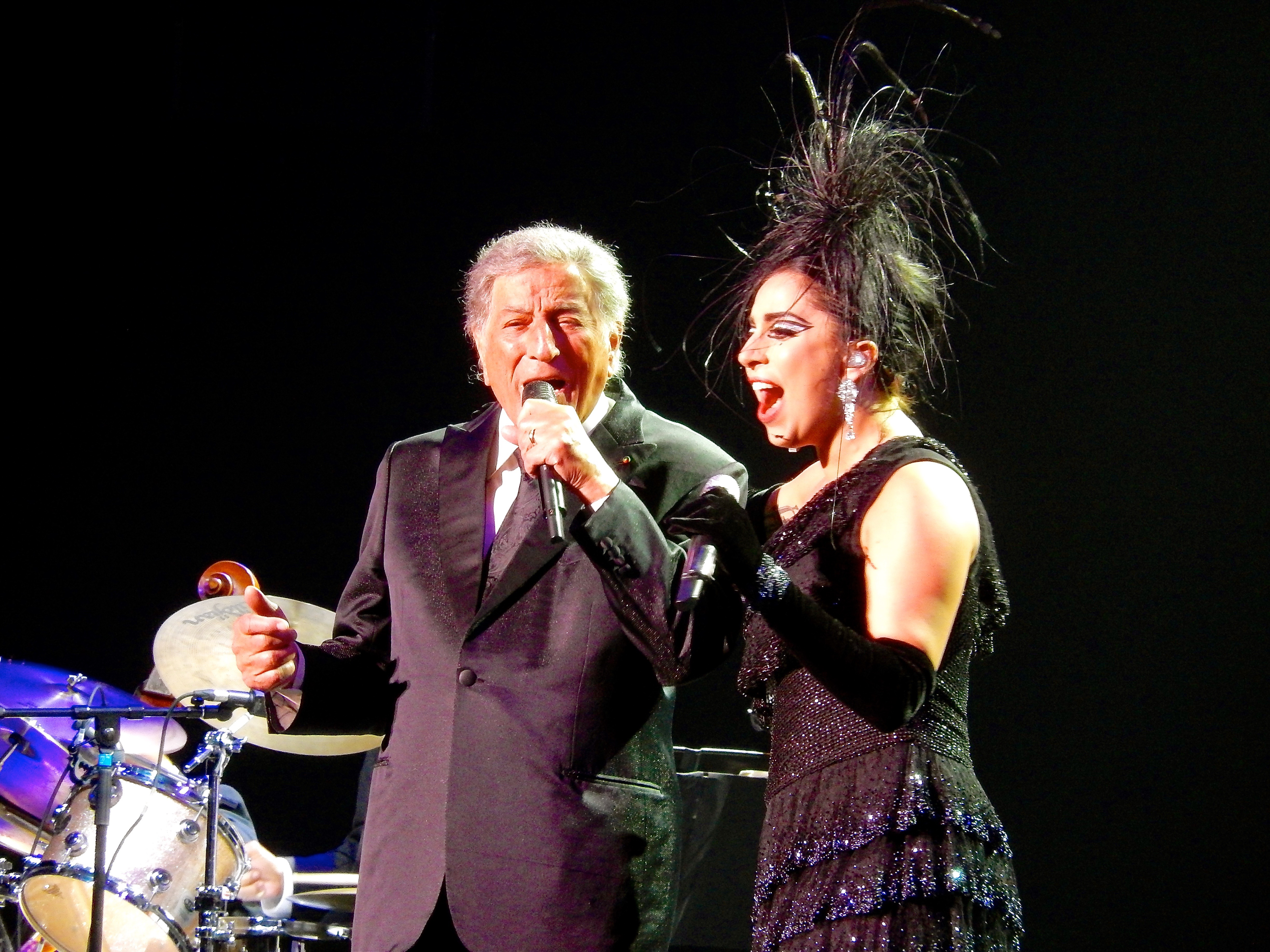
Bennett and Gaga performing in Las Vegas at The AXIS at the Planet Hollywood Resort & Casino

Jesse Lawrence of Forbes reported that strong ticket demand led to additional tour dates and high prices on the secondary market. The opening performances sold out quickly, and listings for the New Year's Eve show at The Chelsea averaged more than $1,000, with the least expensive tickets starting at $329. A separate Forbes report identified the New Year's Eve show as the most expensive concert in Las Vegas that evening, with an average resale price of $647.58 and a minimum listing of $239. Resale listings for the show at The Wiltern averaged $297.64. Demand for the Radio City Music Hall engagements prompted the addition of a June 22 performance, while a second concert at London's Royal Albert Hall was added for June 9 after tickets for the first date went on sale. Tickets for the June 26 and 27 performances at the Ravinia Festival sold out before sales opened to the general public.

In a later Forbes article, Lawrence reported that resale tickets for the Radio City Music Hall shows averaged $380.83, starting at $143, making them the tour's most expensive US dates by that measure. Data from TiqIQ placed the average resale price across 24 US dates at $252.91, an increase of 50.5%. At the Borgata Events Center in Atlantic City, listings averaged $406.90, with entry prices beginning at $220. Near the end of the tour, further concerts sold out, while resale listings for the remaining performances averaged $213.58. In Pollstar's 2015 midyear ranking of worldwide tours, the Cheek to Cheek Tour placed 69th, with $13.1 million in reported grosses from 13 shows and attendance of 146,795. In the magazine's year-end ranking of North American tours, it finished 71st, with $15.3 million in reported ticket revenue from 27 shows and an attendance of 176,267.

== Set list ==
This set list is representative of the show on June 19, 2015. It does not represent all dates throughout the tour.

1. "Anything Goes"
2. "Cheek to Cheek"
3. "They All Laughed"
4. "Stranger in Paradise" / "Sing, You Sinners" (Bennett solo)
5. "Nature Boy"
6. "Watch What Happens" (Bennett solo)
7. "The Good Life" (Bennett solo)
8. "Bang Bang (My Baby Shot Me Down)" (Gaga solo)
9. "Bewitched, Bothered and Bewildered" (Gaga solo)
10. "Firefly"
11. "Smile" / "When You're Smiling" (Bennett solo)
12. "Steppin' Out with My Baby" (Bennett solo)
13. "For Once in My Life" (Bennett solo)
14. "I Won't Dance"
15. "The Lady's in Love with You"
16. "Solitude" (Bennett solo)
17. "I Can't Give You Anything but Love"
18. "Lush Life" (Gaga solo)
19. "I've Got the World on a String" / "In the Wee Small Hours of the Morning" (Bennett solo)
20. "La Vie en rose" (Gaga solo)
21. "How Do You Keep the Music Playing?" (Bennett solo)
22. "Let's Face the Music and Dance"
23. "Ev'ry Time We Say Goodbye" (Gaga solo)
24. "Who Cares?" (Bennett solo)
25. "Fly Me to the Moon" (Bennett solo)
26. "I Left My Heart in San Francisco" (Bennett solo)
27. "But Beautiful"
28. "The Lady Is a Tramp"

Encore

29. "It Don't Mean a Thing (If It Ain't Got That Swing)"

== Shows ==
List of concerts, showing date, city, country, and venue or festival
Date	City	Country	Venue
North America
December 30, 2014	Paradise (Note: Labeled as Las Vegas shows in several sources, disregarding the technical city boundaries.)	United States	The Chelsea Theater
December 31, 2014	Paradise	United States	The Chelsea Theater
February 8, 2015	Los Angeles	United States	The Wiltern
April 10, 2015	Las Vegas	United States	The AXIS
April 11, 2015	Las Vegas	United States	The AXIS
April 23, 2015	Austin	United States	ACL Live at Moody Theater
April 24, 2015	The Woodlands	United States	Cynthia Woods Mitchell Pavilion
April 26, 2015 (Note: This concert was part of the New Orleans Jazz & Heritage Festival.)	New Orleans	United States	Fair Grounds Race Course
May 25, 2015	Vancouver	Canada	Queen Elizabeth Theatre
May 26, 2015	Vancouver	Canada	Queen Elizabeth Theatre
May 28, 2015	Concord	United States	Concord Pavilion
May 30, 2015	Los Angeles	United States	Hollywood Bowl
May 31, 2015	Los Angeles	United States	Hollywood Bowl
Europe
June 8, 2015 (Note: This concert was billed as "A Gala Evening in support of WellChild".)	London	England	Royal Albert Hall
North America
June 13, 2015	Atlantis	The Bahamas	Imperial Ballroom
June 19, 2015	New York City	United States	Radio City Music Hall
June 20, 2015	New York City	United States	Radio City Music Hall
June 22, 2015	New York City	United States	Radio City Music Hall
June 23, 2015	New York City	United States	Radio City Music Hall
June 26, 2015 (Note: This concert was part of the Ravinia Festival.)	Highland Park	United States	Ravinia Park
June 27, 2015	Highland Park	United States	Ravinia Park
June 29, 2015	Wallingford	United States	Toyota Oakdale Theatre
June 30, 2015	Lenox	United States	Tanglewood
Europe
July 4, 2015 (Note: This concert was part of the Monte-Carlo Sporting Summer Festival.)	Monte Carlo	Monaco	Salle des Étoiles Sporting Club
July 6, 2015 (Note: This concert was part of the Montreux Jazz Festival.)	Montreux	Switzerland	Auditorium Stravinski
July 8, 2015 (Note: This concert was part of the Copenhagen Jazz Festival.)	Copenhagen	Denmark	Tivoli
July 10, 2015 (Note: This concert was part of the North Sea Jazz Festival.)	Rotterdam	Netherlands	Rotterdam Ahoy
July 12, 2015 (Note: This concert was part of the Gent Jazz Festival.)	Ghent	Belgium	de Bijloke
July 15, 2015 (Note: This concert was part of the Umbria Jazz Festival.)	Perugia	Italy	Arena Santa Giuliana
July 17, 2015 (Note: This concert was part of the Festival Jardins de Cap Roig.)	Palafrugell	Spain	Jardi Botanic de Cap Roig
North America
July 24, 2015	Atlantic City	United States	Borgata Event Center
July 25, 2015	Bethel	United States	Bethel Woods Center for the Arts
July 27, 2015	Rochester	United States	Meadow Brook Music Festival
July 29, 2015	Atlanta	United States	Chastain Park Amphitheater
July 31, 2015	Washington, D.C.	United States	Kennedy Center Concert Hall
August 1, 2015	Washington, D.C.	United States	Kennedy Center Concert Hall

=== Cancellations ===
List of cancelled concerts, showing date, city, venue, and reason for cancellation
Date	City	Country	Venue	Reason
June 9, 2015 (Note: Live Nation confirmed that the date would not be rescheduled to another one, since Gaga and Bennett were busy with other commitments. Fans who had tickets for the show through Live Nation or Ticketmaster were refunded.)	London	England	Royal Albert Hall	Bennett's flu

=== Box office score data ===
Venue	City	Tickets sold / available	Gross revenue
The Cosmopolitan	Las Vegas	4,200 / 4,200	$813,675
The AXIS	Las Vegas	7,942 / 8,654	$1,057,009
Hollywood Bowl	Los Angeles	33,357 / 34,534	$2,671,774
Meadow Brook Music Festival	Rochester	6,738 / 6,738	$594,810
Total		52,237 / 54,126	$5,137,268
