= Tony Bennett and Lady Gaga: Cheek to Cheek Live! =

American concert television special

- DVD and Blu-ray cover
- Genre: Concert
- Directed by: David Horn
- Starring: Tony Bennett; Lady Gaga
- Country of origin: United States
- Original language: English

Production
- Executive producers: David Horn; Tony Bennett; Lady Gaga; Danny Bennett; Bobby Campbell
- Producer: Mitch Owgang
- Running time: 52:12

Original release
- Network: PBS
- Release: October 24, 2014

Tony Bennett and Lady Gaga: Cheek to Cheek Live! is an American concert television special and live album featuring performances by Tony Bennett and Lady Gaga in support of their collaborative studio album, Cheek to Cheek, released in September 2014. It was held at the Rose Theater of Lincoln Center for the Performing Arts in July following the announcement of the album's release, and was aired on PBS on October 24, 2014, as part of the network's Great Performances series. The concert was watched by an audience consisting of invited guests and students from New York schools. Bennett and Gaga were joined on stage by a 39-piece orchestra and jazz musicians associated with both artists. A number of costumes were worn by Gaga, provided by designers including Roberto Cavalli, Michael Costello, Mathieu Mirano, Valentino as well as David Samuel Menkes. The special received one nomination at the 67th Primetime Emmy Awards.

Bennett and Gaga performed a total of 13 songs from the album, including the number one singles on Billboard's Jazz chart "Anything Goes" and "I Can't Give You Anything but Love". Before the concert was aired, a number of promotional videos from the show were released. Additionally, PBS announced that the concert was filmed in 4K resolution. On January 20, 2015, the DVD and Blu-ray was released, and later for digital download on iTunes Store. It reached the top-ten of the record charts in many countries, reaching number one in the US and Belgium. Bennett and Gaga partnered with LG Electronic, who aired the concert across all retail chains in the United States, on LG's 4K Ultra High-definition TV screens. Tony Bennett and Lady Gaga: Cheek to Cheek Live! became the first concert to be streamed in 4K resolution. The show received positive reviews, with critics praising Gaga and Bennett's vocals and their camaraderie on stage. The concert was later also released as an audio-only live album on CD and vinyl.

== Development ==
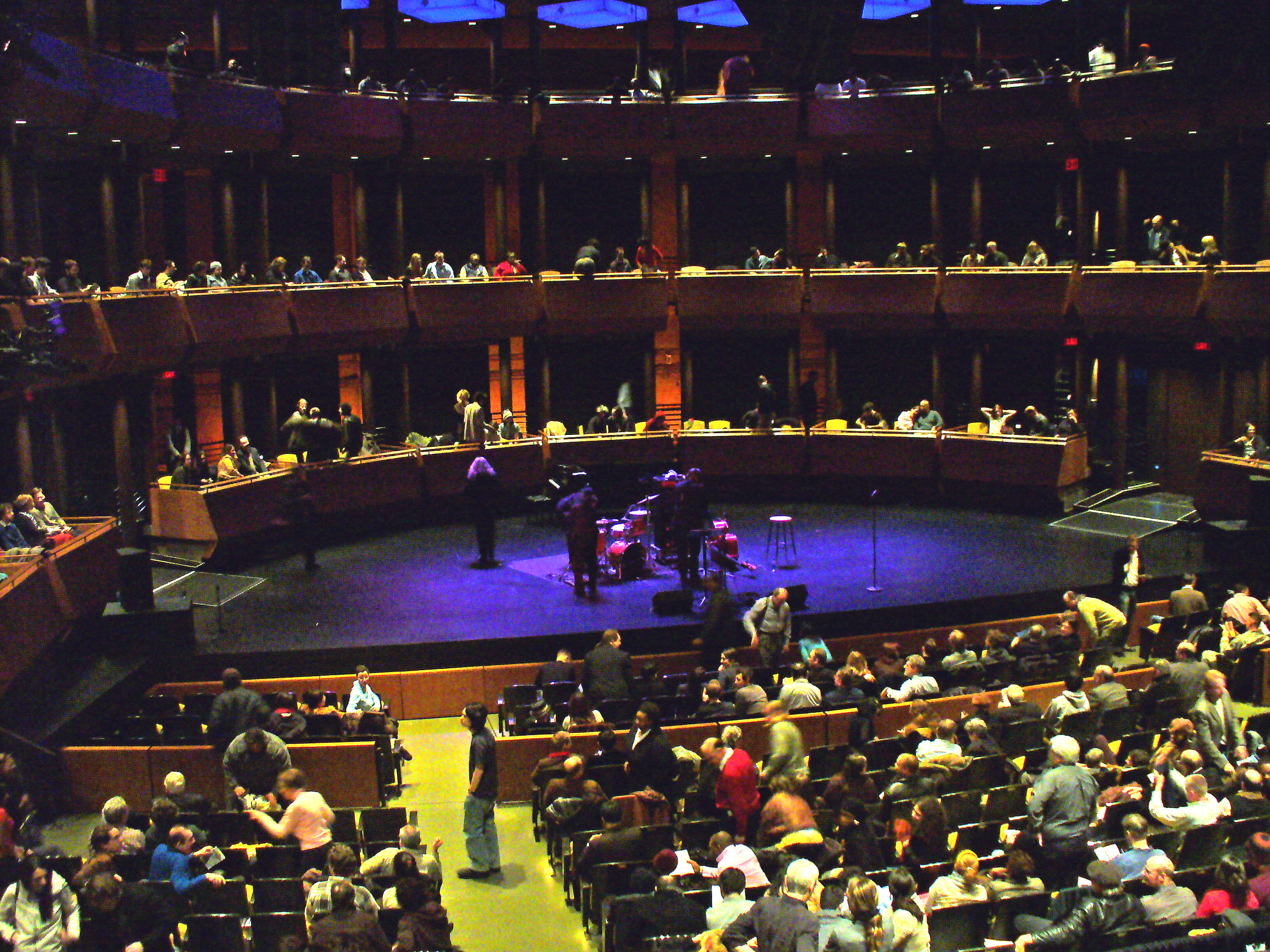
The Rose Theater at the Lincoln Center for the Performing Arts in New York City, where the concert took place

Tony Bennett and Lady Gaga first met backstage in 2011 after she had performed a rendition of Nat King Cole's "Orange Colored Sky", at the Robin Hood Foundation gala in New York City. Bennett then asked Gaga to sing a duet with him on his album Duets II. The two recorded "The Lady Is a Tramp" for Duets II, and subsequently rumors arose of a jazz album from them. On July 29, 2014, Gaga and Bennett made an appearance on The Today Show to formally announce their collaboration, titled Cheek to Cheek, and confirmed their album would be released in September 2014. Following the announcement of the release, a short concert was held at the Rose Theater of Lincoln Center for the Performing Arts. Titled Tony Bennett and Lady Gaga: Cheek to Cheek Live!, the concert aired on PBS as part of their Great Performances series on October 24, 2014. It was watched by an audience consisting of invited guests and students from New York schools. Set and lighting was created by Robert Wilson, while David Horn directed it. Bennett and Gaga were joined onstage by 39-piece orchestra conducted by Jorge Calandrelli, soloists Chris Botti on trumpet and David Mann on tenor sax, and jazz musicians associated with both artists.

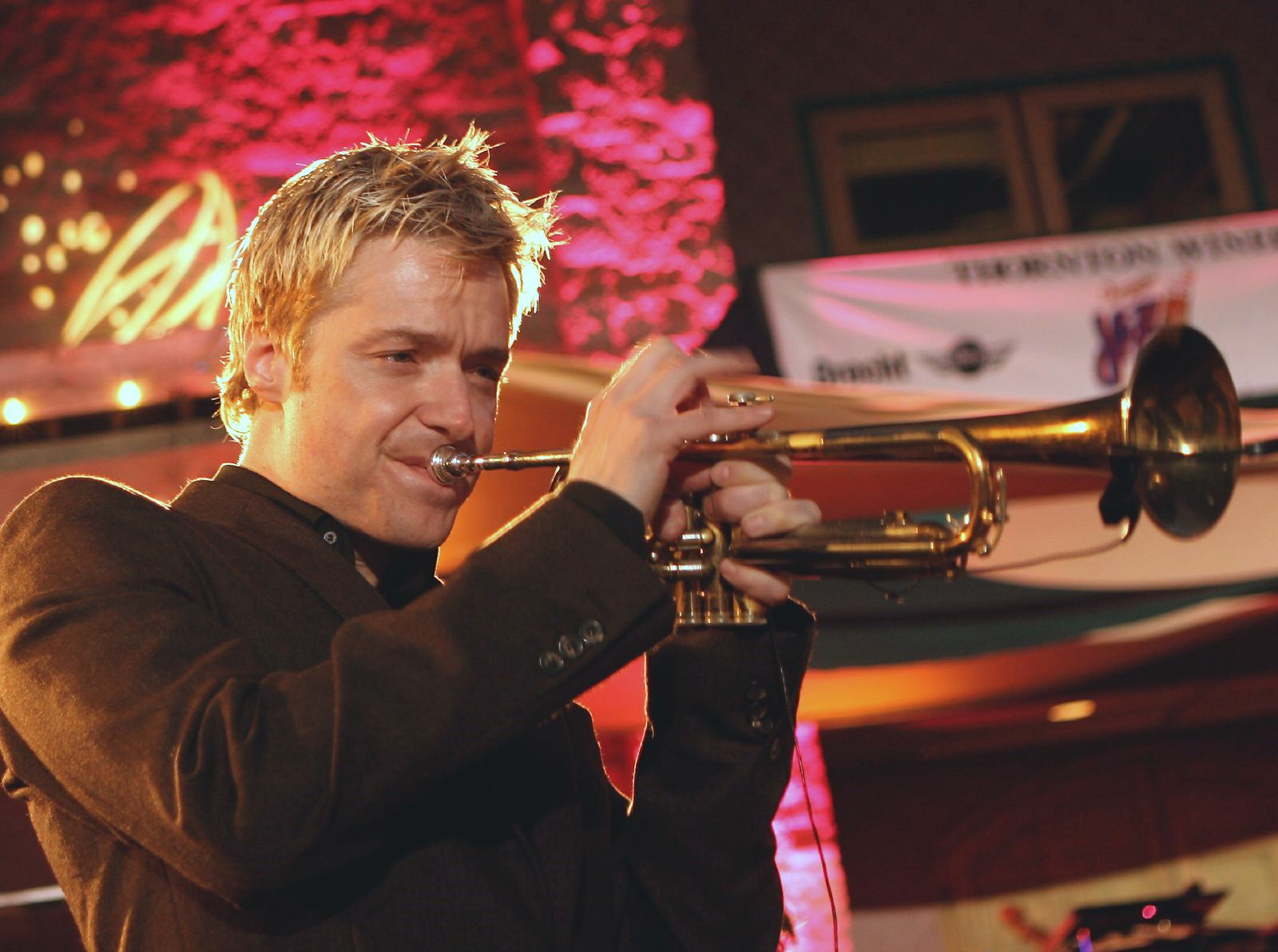
Chris Botti is featured on trumpet.

Gaga wore a myriad of costumes, including a feathered crown from Gympie milliner Cindy Vogels during "I Won't Dance". Vogels was contacted by Brandon Maxwell Studios from New York—Gaga's stylist—for designer pieces available for the concert. According to the milliner the crown almost never reached Gaga since the entire shipment was seized in Anchorage, Alaska due to the feathers on the piece being subjected to wildlife import issues with US customs officials. After much paperwork for five days the millinery designs were finally released and arrived just in time for the Cheek to Cheek promotional photo shoot. Vogels recalled, "It was nerve racking and exciting at the same time and a relief when the shipment was finally released from customs." Maxwell said that he and his team did the wardrobe for the dancers and Gaga, and first took references from Wilson regarding the set and lighting designs. The team then started with eight full racks of clothing, between 200 and 300 dresses, and afterwards zeroed in on eight costumes for the show, along with its accessories. Regarding the absence of jewellery, Maxwell explained that most of the outfits "were more about the silhouette and structure of gowns" and too much of accessories would have been a distraction. He wanted the emphasis on Gaga's vocals, hence the jewellery usage was reduced. Designers used for the costumes include Roberto Cavalli, Michael Costello, Mathieu Mirano, Valentino as well as David Samuel Menkes, who created the leather jumpsuit. Gaga had wanted costumes with teal or turquoise colours and flowing gowns, belted in the middle. Maxwell took care to ensure that the dresses were not too tight in Gaga's abdomen area, since it would have been difficult for her to sing. Sandals were provided by Brian Atwood, Stuart Weitzman and Sophia Webster, while a pair of boots were designed by Giuseppe Zanotti. They created custom made shoes which made Gaga appear tall and move freely in the long gowns.

== Concert synopsis ==
Bennett and Gaga performed thirteen songs. The concert started with Bennett and Gaga appearing before the crowd and singing "Anything Goes", then moving on to the title track, "Cheek to Cheek". A costume change ensues, and Gaga and Bennett appear on stage to sing "Nature Boy". Bennett continues with "How Do You Keep the Music Playing?" following which Gaga appears on stage in Menkes' red jumpsuit and a big wig to sing her solo rendition of "Bang Bang (My Baby Shot Me Down)". Following a standing ovation, the duo come together to perform the Billy Strayhorn penned "Firefly" and Gaga disappears for a third costume change. She appears in Vogels' crown hat and a Valentino gown and together they sing "I Won't Dance" and "I Can't Give You Anything but Love", wearing Cavalli. Gaga stays on stage for solo rendition of "Lush Life", followed by Bennett with his solo performance of "Sophisticated Lady". After another costume change, the duo sing "Let's Face the Music and Dance" and "But Beautiful". The final performance is aided by the full band and dancers, as they sing "It Don't Mean a Thing (If It Ain't Got That Swing)". After taking a bow, Bennett and Gaga disappear behind the curtains.

== Critical reception ==
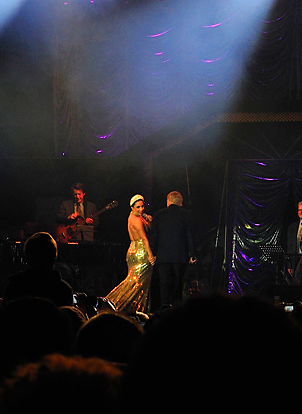
Bennett and Gaga performing songs from Cheek to Cheek at the Grand-Place of Brussels, Belgium

Tony Bennett and Lady Gaga: Cheek to Cheek Live! received mostly positive reviews from critics. Kathryn Shattuck of The New York Times said that is difficult to recognize Lady Gaga "out of her usual get-ups: the meat dresses, seashell bikinis, towering stilettos and skyscraper hair" and praised Bennett's vocals "his voice still strong at 88, take on the Great American Songbook and prove again that the classics can bridge many divides." Soraya Nadia McDonald of The Washington Post wrote "It's become practically cliché to note what an odd couple they make, so we'll just remind you they're actually both divine live performers and they've got great chemistry." Jeff Pfeiffer from Channel Guide said that although Bennett and Gaga "engage in some playfulness and camaraderie which is generally fun, though Lady Gaga may be trying too hard at times". He added that "The artists and the terrific orchestra are in fine form, and though the editing between numbers seemed a bit rapid on occasion, the production and directing is effective to capture the performances".

Lori Rackl from Chicago Sun-Times rated the concert three stars out of four, and observed that it could have "easily fallen into creepy/weird territory" due to the unlikely pairing, but deduced that it was "a classy affair jazzed up by Gaga's always interesting wardrobe choices, which bounce between 70s Cher and Cleopatra." Erin Strecker from Billboard reviewed Gaga's performance of "Bang Bang (My Baby Shot Me Down)" calling her rendition as "incredible" and saying that her "version is all big notes and dramatic tension. Note to Gaga: More of this, please."

Writing for the Seattle Post-Intelligencer, Matt Rush, who had attended the concert in July, noted that the original concert was much longer than the broadcast, due to the time taken by Gaga for changing her costumes. Rush complimented Bennett's performance saying "At 88, the remarkable Tony Bennett ... can still deliver the goods, and his solo rendition of 'How Do You Keep the Music Playing?' is the soaring highlight of [the special]. Bennett's rapport with Gaga seems genuine, and they have a sweet, unforced musical chemistry in these selections from their current album of standards." Brad Oswald from the Winnipeg Free Press was impressed by the duos vocal delivery, saying that "the 88-year-old crooner and the 28-year-old pop diva meld voices seamlessly as they serve up swinging duet versions of such standards". New York Daily News TV Critic David Hinckley, who awarded the concert with four out of five stars, was surprised by Lady Gaga being a "multifaceted singer, not just a dance diva" and stated that Gaga handled the fashion side of the event. He finished the review declaring "The singing in general is solid. Bennett can still hit some remarkable notes, and more important, he understands the songs."

Rand Duren from The Dallas Morning News wrote five reasons why people should not miss the special, claiming "The show is filled to the brim with stunning performances so be ready for a night of musical bliss." Dave Walker from The Times-Picayune complimented Gaga's vocals, likening them to that of singer Liza Minnelli. CNET's Ty Pendlebury was present during the recording of the special and remarked that "without the autotune and other electronic fiddling, Lady Gaga can really sing", but found Bennett's voice to be "bit croaky" sometimes. He also noticed that the whole concert was especially filmed for television, without any audience interaction and "dead silences in between songs."

At the 67th Primetime Creative Arts Emmy Awards on September 12, 2015, the special was nominated for Outstanding Variety, Music or Comedy Special, which went to the Saturday Night Live 40th Anniversary Special.

== Promotion and physical release ==
Promotional videos were released for "Anything Goes" (from Brussels performance) and "Bang Bang (My Baby Shot Me Down)" (from the PBS special) on September 27, 2014. Videos for "Nature Boy", "I Won't Dance", and a backstage video filmed prior to the concert were also included. While the show was being transmitted, Gaga tweeted live and answered questions from fans.

The special was shot with a total of 13 Red Digital Cinema Camera Company's Epic Dragon camera line. Bennett and Gaga partnered with LG Electronic, who had also co-sponsored the concert. According to their deal, the concert started airing across all retail chains in the United States, on LG's 4K Ultra High-definition TV screens. Tony Bennett and Lady Gaga: Cheek to Cheek Live! became the first such concert to be streamed in 4K resolution. LG provided the streaming to dealers for in-store display on their HD TV screens. Dave VanderWaal, the company's head of marketing, said that "thanks in part to LG's co-sponsorship, customers will be able to stream the performance in the highest resolution at no added cost." VanderWaal further clarified that LG had been looking for a way to be upfront in the 4K market and found the option of streaming the concert for its customers as informative and lucrative. Besides, he felt that Bennett and Gaga were suitable from a brand perspective and they would be able to have exclusive rights on the concert.

PBS later announced that the concert was filmed in 4K resolution and was recorded for a 73-minute DVD, which customers from Amazon Video would be able to stream firstly. On January 20, 2015, the DVD and Blu-ray was released, being released later for digital download on iTunes Store. The DVD and Blu-ray editions include additional songs originally not aired on television including, "They All Laughed", "Lady's In Love With You", "Goody Goody", "Bewitched, Bothered and Bewildered", "Don't Wait Too Long" and "Ev'ry Time We Say Goodbye". The DVD charted at number four on the Australian DVD Chart and number one in the US. It also charted on top 10 in many countries, including UK and France. On October 1, 2021, an audio CD containing the performances from the special was released as part of the deluxe edition of Bennett and Gaga's second collaborative album, Love for Sale. It was also released separately in vinyl format as a Record Store Day exclusive on November 25, 2022.

=== Track listing ===
PBS special
No.	Title	Writer(s)	Length
1.	"Anything Goes"	Cole Porter
2.	"Cheek to Cheek"	Irving Berlin
3.	"Nature Boy"	eden ahbez
4.	"How Do You Keep the Music Playing?" (Bennett solo)	Alan Bergman; Marilyn Bergman; Michel Legrand
5.	"Bang Bang (My Baby Shot Me Down)" (Gaga solo)	Sonny Bono
6.	"Firefly"	Cy Coleman; Carolyn Leigh
7.	"I Won't Dance"	Dorothy Fields; Jimmy McHugh; Oscar Hammerstein II; Otto Harbach; Jerome Kern
8.	"I Can't Give You Anything but Love"	Fields; McHugh
9.	"Lush Life" (Gaga solo)	Billy Strayhorn
10.	"Sophisticated Lady" (Bennett solo)	Edward Kennedy Ellington; Irving Mills; Mitchell Parish
11.	"Let's Face the Music and Dance"	Berlin
12.	"But Beautiful"	Johnny Burke; Jimmy Van Heusen
13.	"It Don't Mean a Thing"	Ellington; Mills

DVD, Blu-ray, audio CD and vinyl
No.	Title	Writer(s)	Length
1.	"Anything Goes"	Porter	2:26
2.	"Cheek to Cheek"	Berlin	3:27
3.	"They All Laughed"	George Gershwin; Ira Gershwin	2:00
4.	"The Lady's in Love with You" (Bennett solo)	Burton Lane; Frank Loesser	1:52
5.	"Nature Boy"	ahbez	4:17
6.	"Goody Goody"	Matt Malneck; John Mercer	2:23
7.	"How Do You Keep the Music Playing?" (Bennett solo)	A. Bergman; M. Bergman; Legrand	4:51
8.	"Bang Bang (My Baby Shot Me Down)" (Gaga solo)	Bono	4:43
9.	"Bewitched, Bothered and Bewildered" (Gaga solo)	Richard Rodgers; Lorenz Hart	3:56
10.	"Firefly"	Coleman; Leigh	2:05
11.	"I Won't Dance"	Fields; McHugh; Hammerstein; Harbach; Kern	4:21
12.	"Don't Wait Too Long" (Bennett solo)	Sunny Skylar	3:14
13.	"I Can't Give You Anything but Love"	Fields; McHugh	3:41
14.	"Lush Life" (Gaga solo)	Strayhorn	5:06
15.	"Sophisticated Lady" (Bennett solo)	Ellington; Mills; Parish	2:56
16.	"Let's Face the Music and Dance"	Berlin	2:07
17.	"Ev'ry Time We Say Goodbye" (Gaga solo)	Porter	3:57
18.	"But Beautiful"	Burke; Van Heusen	4:23
19.	"It Don't Mean a Thing (If It Ain't Got That Swing)"	Ellington; Mills	2:43
Total length:			64:21

=== Charts ===
Weekly charts

Chart (2015)	Peak position
Australian Music DVD (ARIA)	3
Austrian Music DVD (Ö3 Austria)	7
Belgian Music DVD (Ultratop Flanders)	1
Belgian Music DVD (Ultratop Wallonia)	4
Dutch Music DVD (MegaCharts)	3
French Music DVD (SNEP)	3
Italian Music DVD (FIMI)	3
Spanish Music DVD (Promusicae)	14
UK Music Videos (Official Charts)	10
US Music Video Sales (Billboard)	1

Year-end charts

Chart (2015)	Position
Australia Music DVD (ARIA)	32
Belgian Music DVD (Ultratop Flanders)	19
Belgian Music DVD (Ultratop Wallonia)	33
Dutch Music DVD (MegaCharts)	37
US Music Video DVD (Billboard)	15

Chart (2022)	Peak position
US Top Jazz Albums (Billboard)	10
US Top Album Sales (Billboard)	86

== Credits and personnel ==
Credits and personnel adapted from the concert special program.

- Tony Bennett – lead vocals
- Lady Gaga – lead vocals

=== Tony Bennett Quartet ===
- Mike Renzi – piano
- Harold Jones – drums
- Gray Sargent – guitar
- Marshall Wood – bass

=== Brian Newman Quartet ===
- Brian Newman – trumpet
- Alex Smith – piano
- Scott Ritchie – bass
- Steve Kortyka – saxophone

=== Dancers ===
- Angie Pontani – dancer
- Maine Attraction – dancer
- Lou Henry Hoover – dancer
- Kitten LaRue – dancer
- Jessy Smith – dancer

=== The After Midnight Band ===
- Andy Farber – tenor saxophone
- Daniel Block – alto saxophone
- Mark Gross – alto saxophone
- Kurt Bacher – baritone saxophone
- Bill Easley – tenor saxophone
- Art Baron – trombone
- James Burton – trombone
- Wayne Goodman – trombone
- Max Seigel – trombone
- Greg Gisbert – trumpet
- Bruce Harris – trumpet
- Alphonse Horne – trumpet
- James Zollar – trumpet
- Chris Botti – solo trumpet
- David Mann – solo saxophone

=== Orchestra ===
- Jorge Calandrelli – conductor
- Elena Barere – violin
- Laura Bald – violin
- Avril Brown – violin
- Sean Carney – violin
- Maria Conti – violin
- Sarah Crocker – violin
- Basia Danilow – violin
- Jonathan Dinklage – violin
- Katherine Fong – violin
- Laura Fraustichi – violin
- Karen Karlsrud – violin
- Laura McGinnis – violin
- Katherine Anderson – viola
- Vincent Conti – viola
- Todd Low – viola
- Diane Barere – cello
- Jeanne LeBlanc – cello
- Richard Locker – cello
- Diane Lesser – oboe / English horn
- Nancy Billmann – French horn
- Stewart Rose – French horn
- Stacey Shames – harp
- Pamela Sklar – flute
- Helena Barere – concert mistress
- Marion Evans – music arranger

=== Production ===
- Danny Bennett – executive producer
- Tony Bennett– executive producer
- Bobby Campbell – executive producer
- Lady Gaga – executive producer
- Philip W. Hack – line producer
- David Horn – executive producer
- Bill Kabel – post production producer
- Dawn Olejar – co-producer
- Mitch Owgang – producer
- Gary Bradley – film editing
- Dae Bennett – audio producer
- J.M. Hurley – video control
- Robert Wilson – lighting design, staged setup
