= Cheek to Cheek (album) =

- Standard edition cover

Studio album by Tony Bennett and Lady Gaga
- Released: September 19, 2014
- Recorded: June 22, 2013–2014
- Studios: KAS Music and Sound, Kaufman Astoria, Manhattan Center, Avatar (New York City)
- Genres: Jazz; traditional pop
- Length: 34:43
- Labels: Columbia; Streamline; Interscope
- Producer: Dae Bennett

Tony Bennett chronology
Viva Duets (2012)	Cheek to Cheek (2014)	The Silver Lining: The Songs of Jerome Kern (2015)

Lady Gaga chronology
Artpop (2013)	Cheek to Cheek (2014)	Joanne (2016)

Singles from Cheek to Cheek
- 1. "Anything Goes" Released: July 29, 2014; 2. "I Can't Give You Anything but Love" Released: August 19, 2014

Cheek to Cheek is the first collaborative album by American singers Tony Bennett and Lady Gaga, released on September 19, 2014, by Columbia, Streamline and Interscope Records. The two first met at the Robin Hood Foundation gala in New York City in 2011, and later recorded a rendition of "The Lady Is a Tramp" together, after which they began discussing plans of working on a jazz project. Cheek to Cheek consists of jazz standards by popular composers such as George Gershwin, Cole Porter, Jerome Kern, and Irving Berlin. It was inspired by Bennett and Gaga's desire to introduce the songs to a younger generation, since they believed these tracks have a universal appeal.

In January 2013, the album was announced by both artists and started its recording process after Gaga recovered from a hip surgery. It was recorded in New York City, where Bennett and Gaga were accompanied by a live band and jazz musicians associated with both artists. Gaga deviated from her previous contemporary pop albums as she wanted instead to create a jazz record. The release date of the album was delayed multiple times, and the final date was announced by Bennett and Gaga on The Today Show. The full-length track listing and cover artwork was released thereafter, including the track lists for many alternate editions. The artists promoted Cheek to Cheek through multiple performances in and around New York, a behind-the-scenes program detailing the recording of the album on the Home Shopping Network (HSN), and a televised concert titled Tony Bennett and Lady Gaga: Cheek to Cheek Live!, which aired on PBS in October 2014. The album was preceded by the release of two singles: "Anything Goes" and "I Can't Give You Anything but Love", which both reached number one on Billboard's Jazz Digital Songs Chart in the United States.

Cheek to Cheek received generally positive reviews upon release, with critics praising the vocal chemistry between Bennett and Gaga. At the 57th Annual Grammy Awards, the album won Best Traditional Pop Vocal Album. Cheek to Cheek debuted at number one on the US Billboard 200, with 131,000 copies sold in its first week according to Nielsen SoundScan, and has since sold 773,000 copies in the United States. The album became Bennett's second number-one album and Gaga's third consecutive number-one in the US; Gaga became the first female artist in the country to have three number-one albums in the 2010s decade, while Bennett extended his record as the oldest artist to achieve a number-one album on the chart. The album also reached the top ten in Australia, Canada, Greece, Italy, Japan, and the United Kingdom. The duo's second collaborative album, Love for Sale, was released on September 30, 2021.

== Background ==
In 2011, Tony Bennett and Lady Gaga first met after she had performed a rendition of Nat King Cole's "Orange Colored Sky" at the Robin Hood Foundation gala in New York City. Bennett then asked Gaga to sing a duet with him on his album Duets II, and the pair recorded "The Lady Is a Tramp" for the album. In September 2012, Bennett confirmed to Rolling Stone that Gaga wanted to record a jazz album with him and there was a well-known composer associated with the project, and although not on a par with songwriters like George Gershwin or Cole Porter, he had had several hits to his name. Swing band and composer Marion Evans was also under consideration for collaborating on the album; Bennett confirmed recording sessions would start soon after.

"Cheek to Cheek came out of a very organic friendship and relationship that Tony and I have built over the years and it truly was a collaborative effort. It was important to Tony that this was a jazz record. I've been singing jazz since I was a child and really wanted to show the authentic side of the genre. We made an album of jazz classics, but it has a modern twist."

— Gaga talking about collaborating with Bennett on Cheek to Cheek

In January 2013, Evans confirmed that he would have a fairly significant part in the making of the album, stating "I don't know at this point exactly how many songs will be on the CD, but I'm sure we'll have about four or five different-sized orchestras or bands. It'll turn into a giant panic, I can assure you. That's just how this business is." Later that month, Gaga, after her performance with Bennett at the final inaugural ball of President Obama's second inauguration, announced the album formally through her Twitter. "And here's me and my handsome date, I simply cannot wait for our album together, he's my darling!" she wrote as a caption for a photo tweeted of the pair, along with revealing the title of the album as Cheek to Cheek.

In September 2013, Bennett explained that for the album, they recorded "all great standards, quality songs; George Gershwin, Cole Porter, Jerome Kern, Irving Berlin, songs like that. With a big swingin' band and great, great, jazz artists playing." He told Chicago Tribune that his main intention of recording the album with Gaga was to introduce the jazz standards to a younger audience, believing that the tracks had a "universal appeal" and "timeless quality" about them. Gaga told The Daily Telegraph that with her earlier releases like The Fame (2008), The Fame Monster (2009), and Born This Way (2011), she felt unable to achieve her full vocal potential. She described Cheek to Cheek as a "rebellious" and "liberating" album for her because she was able to sing without worrying about record producers engineering it for radio.

Bennett said that Gaga had written an original song for the album titled "Paradise". It also contained solo performances along with the duets; Gaga later clarified that the album contained only standards. The songs were handpicked by Bennett and Gaga; they selected tracks from the Great American Songbook including "Anything Goes", a Porter song, "It Don't Mean a Thing (If It Ain't Got That Swing)" and "Sophisticated Lady" by Duke Ellington, "Lush Life" by Billy Strayhorn, and the title track by Berlin.

== Recording and composition ==
Although the project was in development and discussions were taking place as early as September 2012, the recording did not start until the Spring of 2013, being delayed by Gaga's hip surgery and cancellation of her Born This Way Ball tour. The recording took place over a year in New York City, and featured jazz musicians associated with both artists. Bennett's quartet was present, including Mike Renzi, Gray Sargent, Harold Jones and Marshall Wood as well as pianist Tom Lanier. Along with Evans, jazz trumpeter Brian Newman, a longtime friend and colleague of Gaga, played on the album with his New York City based jazz quintet. Tenor saxophonist Joe Lovano and flautist Paul Horn were also enlisted as musicians.

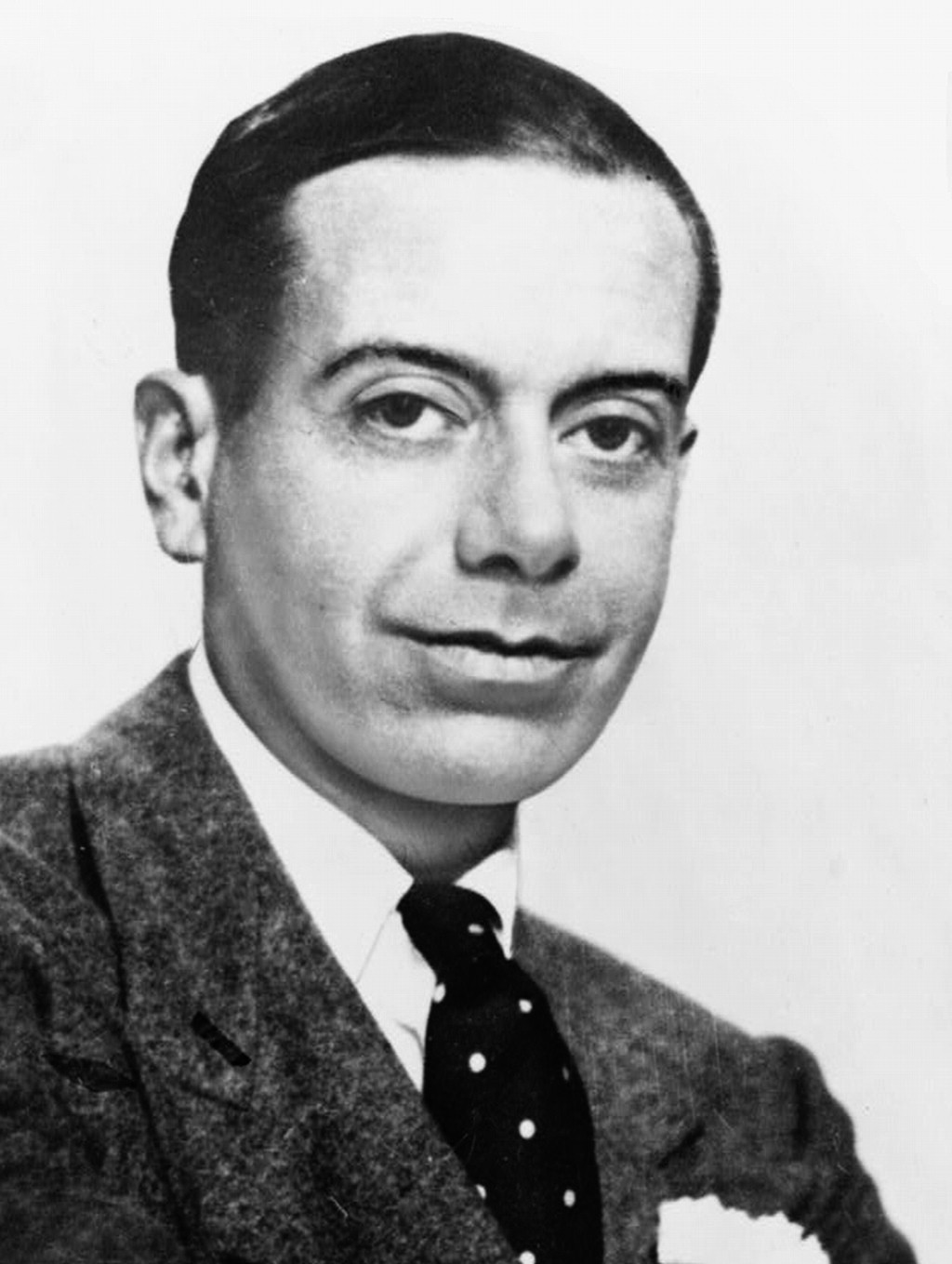
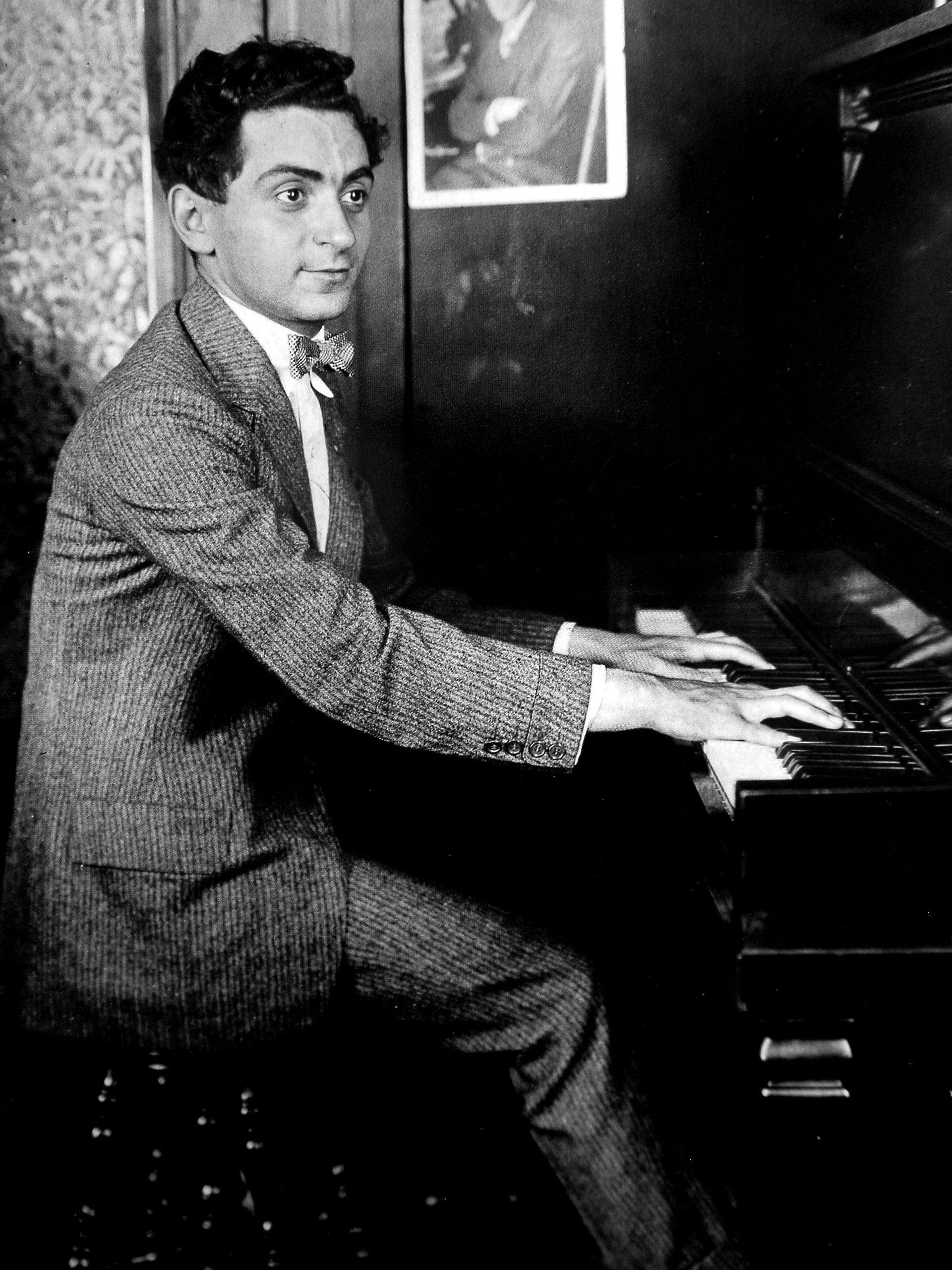
Cheek to Cheek consists of jazz standards by popular jazz composers and lyricists, including Cole Porter (left) and Irving Berlin (right).

According to Gaga, Bennett wanted her to sing different songs and was impressed by her vocals during "Lush Life", referring to the Billy Strayhorn–written standard that has been recorded by everyone from Nancy Wilson and Sarah Vaughan to Donna Summer and Linda Ronstadt. Gaga explained that she was nervous about recording with Bennett. "I just wanted him to hear I have an authentic jazz voice and that I studied that... If he can hear that, I'm okay. If he can't hear it, I'm not an authentic jazz voice", she added. Inspiration for singing came from jazz singer Amy Winehouse, who died in July 2011; Gaga added, "I thought of her almost every day in the studio. I wish she was still here. She was jazz to her core". The songs were recorded live with the band, and during the recording process Gaga asked for carpets to be placed on the studio floor, so that it looked like a film set and it could be photographed.

In Cheek to Cheek, Gaga sings solo on "Lush Life", "Bang Bang (My Baby Shot Me Down)" and "Ev'ry Time We Say Goodbye", while Bennett's solo includes "Don't Wait Too Long" and "Sophisticated Lady". According to Gaga, "Lush Life" and "Sophisticated Lady" complemented each other; for Bennett, the complement came from the fact that Duke Ellington wrote "Sophisticated Lady" and later collaborated with Strayhorn for "Lush Life". Gaga sang "Lush Life" in her school choir, but it was only later she understood the lyrical interpretation of the track, about failure and heartache. While recording Cheek to Cheek she was emotionally upset about her professional and personal conflicts encountered during the Artpop era; Bennett had to support and guide her through the process. Newman recalled that "Bang Bang (My Baby Shot Me Down)" was recorded during the taping of the duo's show at Lincoln Center. Gaga had informed the musicians about performing the song, and piano player Alex Smith made the necessary musical arrangements the night before the concert. They did not rehearse it, and recorded it live when Gaga performed the song in front of the audience.

The first song, "Anything Goes", was recorded by Bennett for his 1959 collaboration with Count Basie and his Orchestra, Strike Up the Band, and Gaga first came to know about it when she was 13 years old. Gaga thought that "Anything Goes" was a funny track with a "real sexy, powerful vibe to it, and it's just because we're having fun singing it." The version on Cheek to Cheek finds Bennett and Gaga swapping the lyrics between themselves, and was described by Bobby Olivier, from The Star-Ledger, as "smooth as silk". The syllables are pronounced strongly by Gaga in syncopation while her vibrato complemented Bennett's characteristic jazz vocals and swing. Olivier added, "Gaga's voice, when stripped of its bells and whistles, showcases a timelessness that lends itself well to the genre." "I Can't Give You Anything but Love" was written in 1928 by Jimmy McHugh and Dorothy Fields for the Broadway revue Blackbirds of 1928. The version on Cheek to Cheek opens with the sound of high-hat and an electronic organ. Gaga alters the lyrics to sing "Gee, I'd like to say you're looking swell, Tony", who later rejoins with the line "Diamond bracelets Woolworth doesn't sell, Gaga". "Nature Boy" was first released as a single in 1948 by Cole, and it became a commercial success for him. Written by eccentric songwriter eden ahbez, the song about a "strange enchanted boy" features instrumentation from flutes and drums, and has an orchestral arrangement. A loungier version, Gaga sings in a Liza Minnelli inspired voice with a breathy range, followed by Bennett complimenting her with the story of meeting the titular character.

== Release and artwork ==
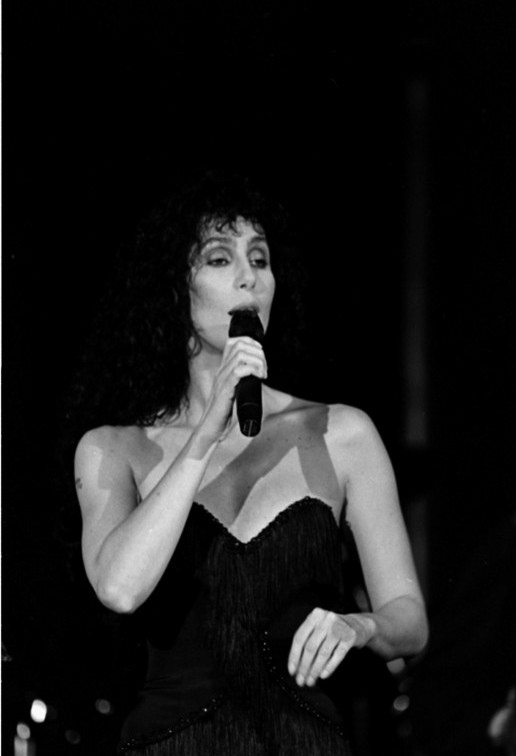
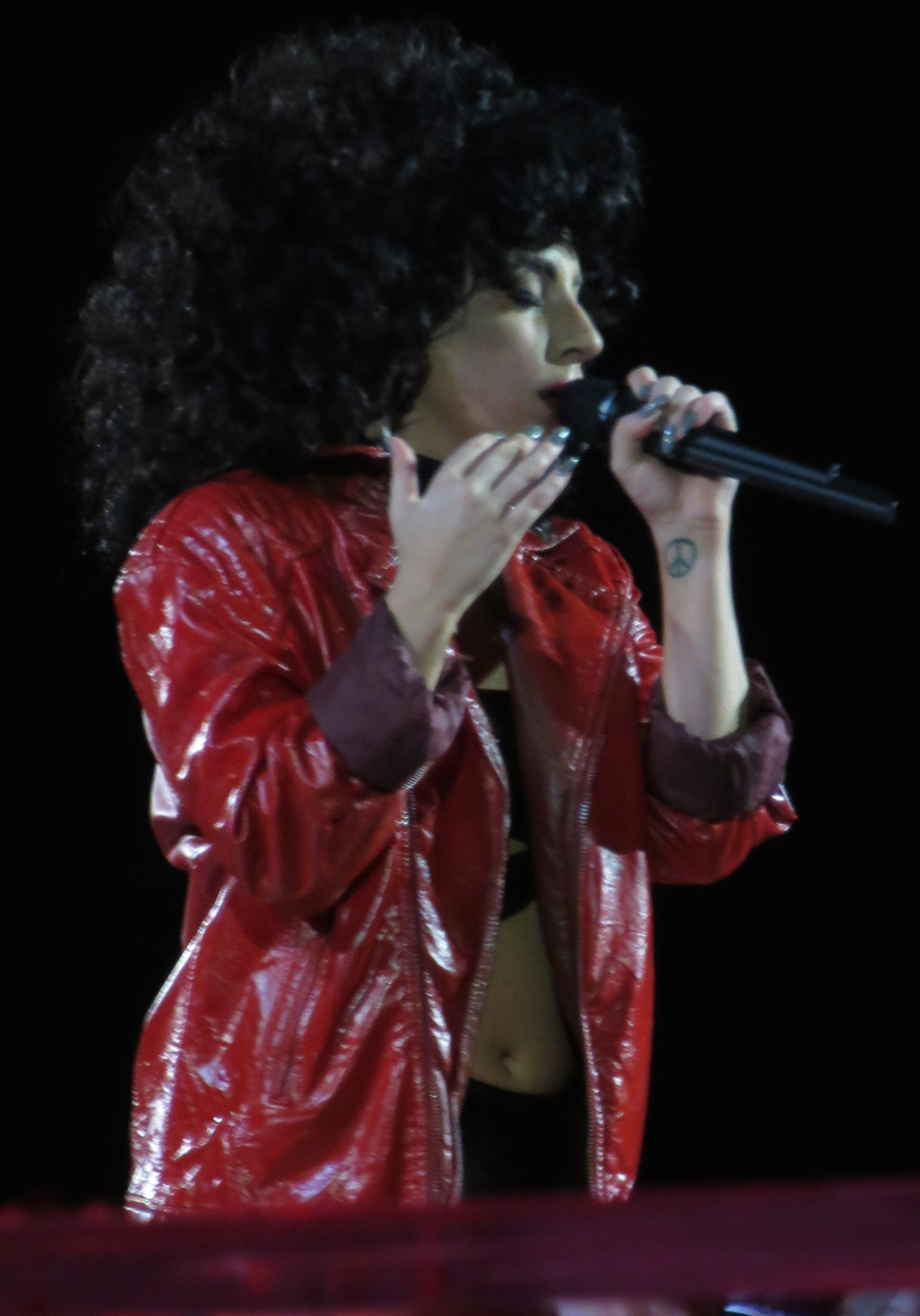
Gaga's image on the album cover was compared to singer Cher (left). Gaga sang "Bang Bang (My Baby Shot Me Down)" wearing an outfit and wig similar to Cher's style during the ArtRave: The Artpop Ball tour (right).

On December 12, 2013, Bennett revealed to CNN that the album's release was delayed and the final release date was confirmed as March 18, 2014. Edna Gunderson from USA Today reported that the album had been delayed and was expected to be released in late 2014. Later in April 2014, during the Museum of the Moving Image's salute to Kevin Spacey, Bennett told a reporter that the album would be released during September. On July 29, 2014, Bennett and Gaga appeared on The Today Show to formally announce their collaboration and confirmed the final release date in the US as September 23, 2014. The album was first released in Australia and Germany on September 19, 2014. Bennett told Billboard that they were also inspired by Porter's 1936 musical, Red, Hot and Blue, for a possible sequel to Cheek to Cheek. He wanted to see how Cheek to Cheek fared after its release, but Gaga wanted to start working on the collaboration "right away". Bennett added: "we're gonna do two albums in a row with her. We'll have to try and do that as soon as possible, just as a follow-up for a second album."

Photographer Steven Klein shot the album covers, and was responsible for the artistic ideas behind the packaging of the release. He also developed the cover art for "Anything Goes". On August 18, 2014, Gaga revealed the album's official cover art, photographed by Klein. She said the image was taken while she and Bennett were "just standing there talking, laughing, singing". For the standard edition, Bennett and Gaga are shown in a New York newspaper with the album name atop the image, while the deluxe edition just features the same image. Gaga's look with her massive black curls in the image was compared by Kirthana Ramisetti from New York Daily News to singer Cher's character in the 1987 American romantic comedy Moonstruck.

The complete track list for the album was also revealed alongside the cover arts. The standard edition consists of 11 tracks while the deluxe edition has 15 songs listed. Along with the standard and deluxe editions in digital and CD formats, there were exclusive releases to Home Shopping Network (HSN) and Target. A 180 grams (0.40 lb) vinyl edition of the album was also released to Amazon.com. The album was sold at Starbucks stores with unique cover artwork. In October 2014, Gaga announced a Collector's Box Set to be released in December 2014. It would include limited edition items, like personal snapshots, Cheek to Cheek sheet music autographed by Bennett, 8×10 art prints housed in a vellum envelope and others.

== Promotion ==
=== Live performances ===
In June 2014, Gaga began promoting the album through a series of public appearances with and without Bennett, the first of them being at the Frank Sinatra School of the Arts in New York City. At the school, which was founded by Bennett and his wife Susan Crow, the pair performed as a duo and individually, and fielded questions from the audience. They concluded their engagement by watching a performance from the school's choir. Gaga also performed with Bennett at the Montreal International Jazz Festival, and starred in a holiday commercial for retail company H&M, directed by Johan Renck and featuring "It Don't Mean a Thing (If I Ain't Got That Swing)". The artists announced the news on Instagram. At the 2014 New York Fashion Week party, Gaga performed "Ev'ry Time We Say Goodbye", dedicating it to her then boyfriend, actor Taylor Kinney.

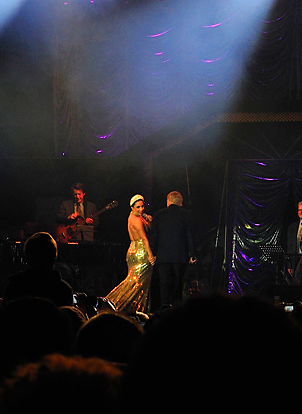
Gaga and Bennett performing at the Grand-Place of Brussels in Belgium

On September 13 and 14, 2014, the Home Shopping Network (HSN) broadcast a special titled Tony Bennett and Lady Gaga: Cheek to Cheek. The music special gave fans an exclusive look behind-the-scenes at the making of the album, as well as never-before-seen footage of the two artists collaborating in the recording studio. It also showcased their song selection process from the Great American Songbook. Before the announcement of the release, a short concert was held at the Rose Theater of the Lincoln Center for the Performing Arts in New York City on July 28. Titled Tony Bennett and Lady Gaga: Cheek to Cheek Live!, the concert aired on the American television network PBS as part of their Great Performances series on October 24, 2014. It was watched by an audience consisting of invited guests and students from New York schools. Set and lighting was created by Robert Wilson, while David Horn directed it. Bennett and Gaga were joined onstage by a 39-piece orchestra conducted by Jorge Calandrelli, soloists Chris Botti on trumpet and David Mann on tenor sax, and jazz musicians associated with both artists. On January 20, 2015, the concert DVD was released.

Three songs from the album were used by ESPN during the advertisements for the 2014 Tennis US Open. The channel's vice president Jamie Reynolds explained that their decision to incorporate the "classic swing vibe of New York" led them to use the Cheek to Cheek songs. Universal Music provided the videos for the songs, which were then mixed with tennis shots and used in the ads. It also used original content like Bennett in his Manhattan apartment, and Gaga on tour in Australia with ArtRave: The Artpop Ball. On September 13, 2014, Bennett joined Gaga onstage at the ArtRave tour in Tel Aviv, Israel to sing selected tracks from the album. Gaga's vocals on "I Can't Give You Anything but Love" drew praise for her range and control. On September 22, Bennett and Gaga performed a short set list of songs from Cheek to Cheek at the Grand-Place of Brussels, Belgium. Their performance received positive reviews, with The Daily Telegraph's Anne Bilson giving it four out of five stars, complimenting their vocals, saying "Bennett had the lungs to compensate, and Gaga had the moves." Promotional videos were released for "Anything Goes" (from Brussels performance) and "Bang Bang (My Baby Shot Me Down)" (from the PBS special) on September 27, 2014.

While touring with ArtRave in the United Kingdom, Gaga appeared with Bennett on the twelfth season of British television show, Strictly Come Dancing, performing two songs from the album, "Anything Goes" and "It Don't Mean a Thing (If It Ain't Got That Swing)". Following the tour's completion, the duo performed the title track on the talk shows The View and The Colbert Report. For the Christmas Tree lighting at Rockefeller Center, Bennett and Gaga performed a rendition of "Winter Wonderland". A few days later on The Tonight Show Starring Jimmy Fallon, they performed "Cheek to Cheek" and "It Don't Mean a Thing (If I Ain't Got That Swing)" and Gaga singing solo on "Ev'ry Time We Say Goodbye".

=== Cheek to Cheek Tour ===
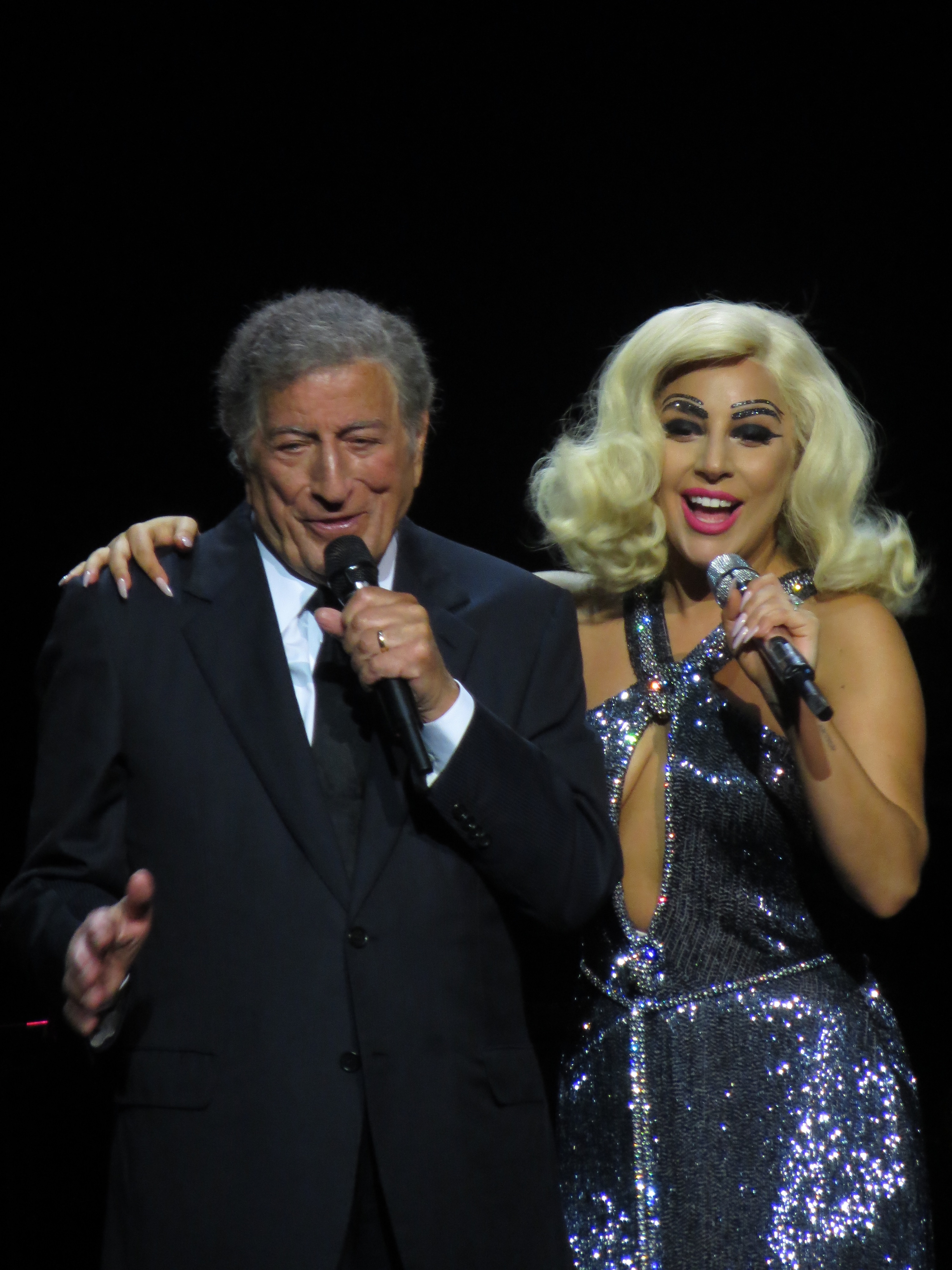
Bennett and Gaga performing on the Cheek to Cheek Tour at London's Royal Albert Hall

Bennett had confirmed that he and Gaga would tour jazz festivals in 2015, supporting Cheek to Cheek. According to him, Gaga was tired from playing bigger venues, and wanted to have the tour visit smaller venues for at least three-four days, or for three-six weeks. Bennett also explained that he was accustomed to playing in acoustic music halls and outdoor theaters, so Gaga had been looking at such options. "I'm not interested in playing to 45,000 people a night, so [Gaga's] finding places where we could work for three or four days, or three or four weeks, in one place at a time. That's how she wants to work with me", the singer concluded. On New Year's Eve 2014, the duo started the Cheek to Cheek Tour by performing at the Cosmopolitan Casino of Las Vegas, making it their first concert in US following the album's release. They also performed at the 57th Annual Grammy Awards and its scheduled a post-Grammy concert on February 8, 2015, at the Wiltern Theatre in Los Angeles, just after the conclusion of the ceremony. More shows were scheduled in 2015, including Hollywood Bowl on May 30; the Royal Albert Hall in London on June 8; and Radio City Music Hall in New York City on June 19. Jesse Lawrence from Forbes reported that there was high demand for the tickets, leading to additional dates being added to the itinerary. He also noted that the concerts had a much higher ticket price than the average, especially in the secondary markets.

=== Singles ===
"Anything Goes" was released as the first single from the album on July 29, 2014, to digital retailers, followed by the release of its music video to Gaga's YouTube and Vevo accounts. The video showed Bennett and Gaga recording "Anything Goes" as well as other songs from Cheek to Cheek. In the United Kingdom, "Anything Goes" debuted at number 174 on the UK Singles Chart for the week ending August 9, 2014. It also charted at number 132 on the sales chart of the Official Charts Company. In Spain it debuted within the top-fifty of the PROMUSICAE singles chart at number 40. "Anything Goes" debuted outside the top 100 of the French Singles Chart, at number 178. On the Billboard Jazz Digital Songs chart, the track debuted at the top, becoming Gaga's second entry on that chart, following "The Lady is a Tramp". The song was Bennett's 15th entry on the Jazz Digital Songs chart, and his third number-one single. According to Nielsen SoundScan, "Anything Goes" sold 16,000 digital downloads in the US up to the week ending August 3, 2014. The song dropped to number three on Jazz Digital Songs chart the next week.

"I Can't Give You Anything but Love" was released as the second single from the album on August 19, 2014. Gaga announced the release on Twitter, accompanied by the single's cover art. An official music video for the song was released on August 26, 2014. The video was shot in the recording studio and the first half showed Gaga in numerous outfits and wigs, while recording the song and roaming around. Bennett joins the studio sessions later on, singing the song. The final chorus finds the two singers belting together, described as "join[ing] forces for a peculiar, yet potent blend of styles that transcends generations and genres". Jon Blistein from Rolling Stone complimented the video, saying that it "proves [Bennett and Gaga] exude a unique, adorable brand of musical chemistry". After its release, "I Can't Give You Anything but Love" debuted at number-one on the Jazz Digital Songs chart of Billboard, on the week ending September 6, 2014, and the French Singles Chart at number 173.

== Critical reception ==
Professional ratings
Aggregate scores
Source	Rating
Metacritic	64/100
Review scores
Source	Rating
AllMusic	3/5 stars
Billboard	3/5 stars
Cuepoint (Expert Witness)	B+
The Daily Telegraph	3/5 stars
Entertainment Weekly	B+
The Guardian	4/5 stars
New York Daily News	4/5 stars
Newsday	A−
Rolling Stone	3/5 stars
Slant Magazine	2/5 stars

At Metacritic, which assigns a weighted mean rating out of 100 to reviews from music critics, Cheek to Cheek received an average score of 64, indicating "generally favorable reviews", based on 12 reviews. MTV News's Gil Kaufman praised the album, calling Bennett and Gaga "a match made in heaven". He added that the singers were able to "flawlessly" merge their unique vocals, that was reflected in their in-studio rapport, and thus onto the songs on Cheek to Cheek. Caroline Sullivan of The Guardian awarded the album with four out of five stars, claiming that "Gaga is a wonder". She also praised that "Cheek to Cheek reveals the considerable warmth and depth of her voice". The Times critic Will Hodgkinson praised the album giving it a rating of four out of five stars. He added that Gaga could have been a "habitué of Upper Manhattan piano bars and supper clubs.. as Stefani Germanotta, classy singer of standards". Jazz critic Marc Myers reviewed the album for The Wall Street Journal, claiming that "the biggest surprise on the album is Gaga's solo vocal on 'Lush Life', a difficult song that has troubled even the most seasoned jazz-pop singers, including Frank Sinatra. Her lower register is warm and her phrasing is heartfelt." In his favorable review, Chicago Tribune critic Howard Reich wrote that "Cheek to Cheek serves up the real thing, start to finish... Both singers revel in swing rhythm, eager to buoy from one offbeat to the next and the next. They achieve considerable energy. But it's when things slow down that you can hear what these artists are capable of as interpreters, alone and together."

Jazz author Ted Gioia, who reviewed the album for The Daily Beast, was surprised by Gaga's ability to sing jazz, saying that "in all fairness to Lady Gaga, any singer who matches up with Tony Bennett needs to get loud and assertive... Her voice projects an appealing innocence [on] 'But Beautiful' and 'Ev'ry Time We Say Goodbye'". Rating it four out of five stars, Lewis Corner from Digital Spy complimented the vocal mix on the album, adding that "Cheek to Cheek may not be the glittering spectacle we've come to expect from Lady Gaga, but with Tony Bennett's guidance the pair have delivered an authentic and solid jazz record that respects the genre's generous history. Jon Dolan from Rolling Stone gave the album three out of five stars and praised Gaga's vocals. Dolan felt the album "proves she can be a sophisticated lady". Charles J. Gan from Associated Press also praised Bennett and Gaga's singing, writing that "Had she been born in an earlier era, Gaga would have been right at home in an MGM musical". Writing for the National Post, Mike Doherty observed that Gaga took "liberties with the beat, bends notes, purrs and whoops away" with the vocals, while Bennett was able to complement with his characteristic "dapper approach".

With three stars out of five, Kenneth Partridge from Billboard opined that Gaga justified Bennett's faith in her – but sometimes "too forcibly" – and that she needed him, more than he needed her, on the recording of the album. Partridge summarized that overall, they had a "blast together and both will benefit from this pairing". Another three and a half star rating came from Lydia Jenkin of The New Zealand Herald, who declared the album as "seamless standard renditions". Jim Farber from New York Daily News awarded the album with four out of five stars, claiming that "Gaga has always been a power singer" and "She has a lot of Liza Minnelli in her". Bennett received great review from the site about the agility and pluck he is able to sing the songs. James Reed from The Boston Globe praised the album and felt that both singers "bring out the best in each other". Neil McCormick of The Daily Telegraph gave the album a rating of three stars out of five, writing "If you take this album in the spirit of throwaway fun in which it seems to have been concocted, it is harmlessly engaging". Giving Cheek to Cheek a rating of A−, Glenn Gamboa from Newsday declared the album as "straightforward jazz, gorgeous and well crafted". Adam Markovitz of Entertainment Weekly commented that Bennett and Gaga are "in–if not quite heaven, then at least a pretty swell piano bar" and gave the album B+.

In a mixed review, Stephen Thomas Erlewine from AllMusic declared that "Cheek to Cheek is a record where the music and even the songs take a backseat to the personalities". Alexa Camp from Slant Magazine gave the album a rating of two out of five stars. Camp criticized Bennett and Gaga's vocals in the album, adding that "If not for the session musicians' top-notch work... much of Cheek to Cheek, which drags at an economical 45 minutes, would sound like glorified karaoke." San Francisco Chronicle writer Aidin Vaziri was disappointed with Bennett and Gaga not "highlight[ing] each other's wildly distinguishing features", adding that "the background music is far more exciting than the people singing over it". Mikael Wood from Los Angeles Times complimented Gaga's vocals in the album but panned her "cheap exploitation: of a bunch of important songs she brings nothing to; of an 88-year-old legend with whom she has zero chemistry; and, most disappointingly, of our eagerness to follow her down an unlikely creative path." At the 57th Annual Grammy Awards on February 8, 2015, Cheek to Cheek won a Grammy for Best Traditional Pop Vocal Album. It also won Jazz Album of the Year at the 2015 Japan Gold Disc Awards.

== Commercial performance ==
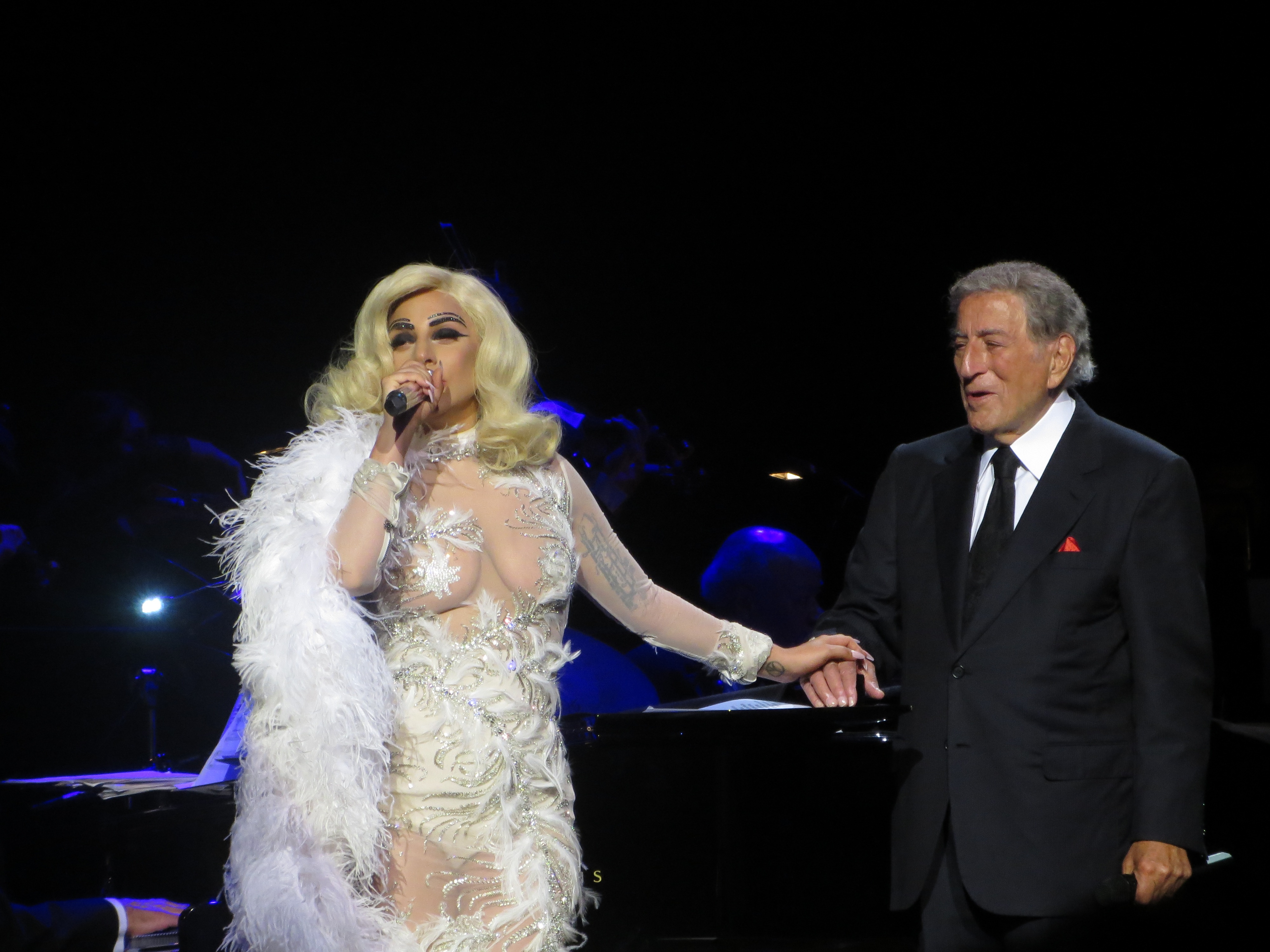
Gaga and Bennett performing "But Beautiful" on the Cheek to Cheek Tour

Cheek to Cheek debuted at number one on the Billboard 200 with 131,000 copies sold in its first week according to Nielsen SoundScan, earning Gaga her third consecutive number-one album and the second for Bennett. It also topped the Jazz Albums and Traditional Jazz Albums charts. Bennett beat his own record—previously achieved in 2011 with Duets II—as the oldest living act to earn a number one album in the US, giving him the Guinness World Records for "oldest person to reach No.1 on the US Album Chart with a newly recorded album", at the age of 88 years and 69 days. The debut also made Gaga the first female artist in the 2010 decade to have three number-one albums. Along with the Billboard 200 and Jazz Albums, Cheek to Cheek also entered at number four on the Top Digital Albums chart. As of February 2019, the album has sold more than 773,000 copies in the country, becoming Bennett's seventh half-million album since Nielsen began tracking data in 1991, and Gaga's fifth. It was certified gold by the Recording Industry Association of America (RIAA) for shipment of over 500,000 copies. In July 2019, Billboard named Cheek to Cheek the fourth most successful collaborative album of all time in the United States, across all musical genres. Cheek to Cheek debuted at number three on the Canadian Albums Chart selling 10,000 copies per SoundScan. It was certified Platinum by the Music Canada (MC) for shipment of 80,000 copies of the album.

In the United Kingdom, the album debuted at number ten on the UK Albums Chart with sales of 10,469 copies, making it Gaga's fifth top ten album and Bennett's third. Cheek to Cheek dropped to number 24 in its second week, selling 4,081 copies. Due to Bennett and Gaga's appearance on Strictly Come Dancing and Gaga's ArtRave tour, the album rebounded to number 12 on the chart in its fifth week, selling 6,257 copies. In November 2015, the album was certified silver by the British Phonographic Industry (BPI) for selling over 60,000 copies. In Ireland the album debuted outside the top-ten of the Irish Albums Chart, at number 12, dropping to number 24 the next week. In its fifth week, Cheek to Cheek again climbed from number 50 to number 24 on the chart.

In Australia, Cheek to Cheek debuted at number seven on the ARIA Albums Chart, becoming the second top-ten album for Tony in Australia out of 56 albums released and it was the fifth top-ten album for Gaga. It dropped to number ten the next week before moving to its peak again in the third week. The Australian Recording Industry Association (ARIA) certified it Gold for shipment of 35,000 copies in the country. In New Zealand it debuted at number 13 on the albums chart, peaking at number three in its fourth week. In Japan, it debuted at number seven on the Oricon albums chart with sales of 11,397 copies, dropping one spot the next week with another 7,371 copies sold. Cheek to Cheek was Gaga's fourth top-ten album in France, where it debuted at number nine and has sold 40,000 copies according to the Syndicat National de l'Édition Phonographique (SNEP). On the Greek Albums Chart, the album reached a peak of number two on its third week.

== Track listing ==
All songs produced by Dae Bennett, except "The Lady Is a Tramp", produced by Phil Ramone and Dae Bennett.

Cheek to Cheek – Standard edition
No.	Title	Writer(s)	Length
1.	"Anything Goes"	Cole Porter	2:04
2.	"Cheek to Cheek"	Irving Berlin	2:51
3.	"Nature Boy"	eden ahbez	4:08
4.	"I Can't Give You Anything but Love"	Dorothy Fields; Jimmy McHugh	3:13
5.	"I Won't Dance"	Fields; McHugh; Oscar Hammerstein II; Otto Harbach; Jerome Kern	3:57
6.	"Firefly"	Cy Coleman; Carolyn Leigh	1:58
7.	"Lush Life" (Gaga solo)	Billy Strayhorn	4:15
8.	"Sophisticated Lady" (Bennett solo)	Edward Kennedy Ellington; Irving Mills; Mitchell Parish	3:49
9.	"Let's Face the Music and Dance"	Berlin	2:07
10.	"But Beautiful"	Johnny Burke; Jimmy Van Heusen	4:04
11.	"It Don't Mean a Thing (If It Ain't Got That Swing)"	Ellington; Mills	2:24
Total length:			34:43

Cheek to Cheek – iTunes Store edition (bonus track)
No.	Title	Writer(s)	Length
12.	"Bang Bang (My Baby Shot Me Down)" (Gaga solo) (live from Jazz at Lincoln Center)	Sonny Bono	3:43
Total length:			38:26

Cheek to Cheek – Deluxe edition
No.	Title	Writer(s)	Length
1.	"Anything Goes"	Porter	2:04
2.	"Cheek to Cheek"	Berlin	2:51
3.	"Don't Wait Too Long" (Bennett solo)	Sunny Skylar	2:36
4.	"I Can't Give You Anything but Love"	Fields; McHugh	3:13
5.	"Nature Boy"	ahbez	4:08
6.	"Goody Goody"	Matt Malneck; John Mercer	2:12
7.	"Ev'ry Time We Say Goodbye" (Gaga solo)	Porter	3:10
8.	"Firefly"	Coleman; Leigh	1:58
9.	"I Won't Dance"	Fields; McHugh; Hammerstein; Harbach; Kern	3:57
10.	"They All Laughed"	George Gershwin; Ira Gershwin	1:49
11.	"Lush Life" (Gaga solo)	Strayhorn	4:15
12.	"Sophisticated Lady" (Bennett solo)	Ellington; Mills; Parish	3:49
13.	"Let's Face the Music and Dance"	Berlin	2:07
14.	"But Beautiful"	Burke; Van Heusen	4:04
15.	"It Don't Mean a Thing (If It Ain't Got That Swing)"	Ellington; Mills	2:24
Total length:			44:28

Cheek to Cheek – HSN bonus tracks
No.	Title	Writer(s)	Length
16.	"Lady's in Love with You" (Bennett solo) (live from Jazz at Lincoln Center)	Burton Lane; Frank Loesser	1:42
17.	"The Lady Is a Tramp" (from Duets II)	Richard Rodgers; Lorenz Hart	3:18
Total length:			49:27

Cheek to Cheek – iTunes Store deluxe edition (bonus track)
No.	Title	Writer(s)	Length
16.	"Bang Bang (My Baby Shot Me Down)" (Gaga solo) (live from Jazz at Lincoln Center)	Bono	3:43
Total length:			48:11

Cheek to Cheek – Target and Asian digital deluxe edition (bonus tracks)
No.	Title	Writer(s)	Length
16.	"On a Clear Day (You Can See Forever)" (Bennett solo)	Lane; Alan Jay Lerner	2:34
17.	"Bewitched, Bothered and Bewildered" (Gaga solo)	Rodgers; Hart	3:07
Total length:			50:09

Cheek to Cheek – International physical deluxe edition (bonus tracks)
No.	Title	Writer(s)	Length
18.	"The Lady Is a Tramp" (from Duets II)	Rodgers; Hart	3:18
Total length:			53:27

Cheek to Cheek – Japanese physical deluxe edition (bonus tracks)
No.	Title	Writer(s)	Length
18.	"Lady's in Love with You" (Bennett solo) (live from Jazz at Lincoln Center)	Lane; Loesser	1:42
19.	"The Lady Is a Tramp" (from Duets II)	Rodgers; Hart	3:18
Total length:			55:09

== Personnel ==
Credits adapted from Cheek to Cheek Dutch CD liner notes.

=== Management ===
- Recorded at KAS Music and Sound, Kaufman Astoria Studios, Astoria, New York; Manhattan Center Studios, Manhattan; Avatar Studios, New York
- Mixed at Avatar Studios, New York
- Mastered at Sterling Sound Studios, New York
- Sennheiser and Neumann provided the microphones for Tony Bennett
- RPM Productions representative for Bennett: Sandi Rogers, Dawn Olejar, Sylvia Weiner, Hadley Spanier, Erica Fagundes, John Callahan, Seth Ferris
- Sony Music Entertainment representative for Bennett: Doug Morris, Rob Stringer, Nancy Marcus-Sekhir

=== Personnel ===
- Tony Bennett – lead vocals
- Lady Gaga – lead vocals
- Lee Musiker – vocal and rhythm arrangement, music director for Bennett
- Dae Bennett – producer, recording, mixing
- Danny Bennett – manager (Bennett), executive producer
- Bobby Campbell – manager (Gaga)
- Vincent Herbert – A&R for Streamline Records
- Brandon Maxwell – fashion director
- Frederic Aspiras – makeup
- Don Lawrence – vocal instruction
- Dave Russell – additional engineering
- Jill Dell'Abate – production manager, contractor
- Tom Young & Acir Pro Audio – live sound management
- Alessandro Perrotta – Pro Tools
- Mike Bauer – assistant engineer
- Tim Marchiafava – assistant engineer
- Akihiro Mishimura – assistant engineer
- Darren Moore – assistant engineer
- Sheldon Yellowhair – assistant engineer
- Greg Calbi – mastering
- Larry H. Abel – music copyist
- Joann Kane – music copyist
- Ivy Skoff – union contractor co-ordinator
- Kenneth R. Meiselas – legal issues
- Sonya Guardo – legal issues
- Lisa Einhorn-Gilder – production co-ordinator
- Dyaana Kass – marketing
- Jurgen Grebner – international repertoire
- Tomoko Itoki – international repertoire
- Nick Miller – international repertoire
- Amanda Silverman – public relations
- Dennis Dauncy – public relations (Interscope)
- Ianthe Zevos – creative director
- Steven Klein – photographer
- Gretchen Anderson – production work

=== Orchestra ===
- Jorge Calandreili – orchestra conductor, arranger
- Elena Barere – violin
- Jorge Avila – violin
- Laura Bald – violin
- Sean Carney – violin
- Barbara Danilow – violin
- Laura Frautschi – violin
- Sanguen Han – violin
- Karen Karlsrud – violin
- Yoon Kwon – violin
- Ann Leathers – violin
- Nancy McAlhaney – violin
- Laura McGinnis – violin
- Kristina Musser Gitterman – violin
- Alex Sharpe – violin
- Catherine Sim – violin
- Sebu Sirinian – violin
- Lisa Tipton – violin
- Una Tone – violin
- Yuri Vodovoz – violin
- Xiao-Dong Wang – violin
- Nancy Wu – violin
- Eric Wyrick – violin
- Robert Zubrycki – violin
- Vincent Lionti – viola
- Sarah Adams – viola
- Katherine Anderson – viola
- Kimberly Foster Wallace – viola
- Todd Low – viola
- Martha and Alissa Smith – viola
- Richard Locker – cello
- Diane Barere – cello
- Stephane Cummins – cello
- Jeanne LeBlanc – cello
- Saeunn Thorsteinsdottir – cello
- Ellen Westermann – cello
- Barbara Allen – harp
- Susan Folles – harp
- Paul Horn – flute
- Pamela Sklar – flute
- Katherine Fink – flute
- Diane Lesser – oboe
- Pavel Vinnitsky – clarinet
- Mike Atkinson – French horn
- Bob Carlisle – French horn
- Nancy Billman – French horn
- Theo Primis – French horn
- Stewart Rose – French horn

=== Instruments ===
- Marion Evans – brass conductor, arranger
- Lou Marini – alto saxophone
- Lawrence Feldman – alto saxophone
- Dave Mann – tenor saxophone
- Andy Snitzer – tenor saxophone
- Tony Kadleck – trumpet
- Brian Newman – trumpet
- Bob Millikan – trumpet
- John Owens – trumpet
- Bud Burridge – trumpet
- Mike Davis – tenor trombone
- Larry Farrell – tenor trombone
- Keith O'Quinn – tenor trombone
- George Flynn – bass trombone
- Harold Jones – DW drums, Zildjian cymbals
- Gray Sargent – Godin 5th Avenue archtop guitar
- Mike Renzi – piano
- Tom Ranier – piano
- Marshall Wood – bass

== Charts ==
=== Weekly charts ===
Weekly chart performance for Cheek to Cheek
Chart (2014)	Peak position
Argentine Albums (CAPIF)	6
Australian Albums (ARIA)	7
Australian Jazz Albums (ARIA)	1
Austrian Albums (Ö3 Austria)	6
Belgian Albums (Ultratop Flanders)	4
Belgian Albums (Ultratop Wallonia)	4
Brazilian Albums (ABPD)	7
Canadian Albums (Billboard)	3
Chinese Albums (Sino Chart)	17
Croatian Albums (HDU)	8
Czech Albums (ČNS IFPI)	4
Danish Albums (Hitlisten)	9
Dutch Albums (Album Top 100)	13
Finnish Albums (Suomen virallinen lista)	27
French Albums (SNEP)	9
German Albums (Offizielle Top 100)	12
Greek Albums (IFPI)	2
Hungarian Albums (MAHASZ)	35
Irish Albums (IRMA)	12
Italian Albums (FIMI)	6
Japanese Albums (Oricon)	7
Mexican Albums (Top 100 Mexico)	4
New Zealand Albums (RMNZ)	3
Polish Albums (ZPAV)	31
Portuguese Albums (AFP)	7
Scottish Albums (Official Charts)	11
South Korean International Albums (Circle) Deluxe version	7
Spanish Albums (Promusicae)	5
Swedish Jazz Albums (Sverigetopplistan)	1
Swiss Albums (Schweizer Hitparade)	7
Taiwanese Jazz Albums (G-Music)	1
UK Albums (Official Charts)	10
UK Jazz & Blues Albums (Official Charts)	1
US Billboard 200	1
US Top Jazz Albums (Billboard)	1
US Indie Store Album Sales (Billboard)	2

=== Year-end charts ===
Year-end chart performance for Cheek to Cheek
Chart (2014)	Position
Argentinian Albums (CAPIF)	15
Australian Albums (ARIA)	62
Australian Jazz Albums (ARIA)	1
Belgian Albums (Ultratop Flanders)	102
Belgian Albums (Ultratop Wallonia)	112
Canadian Albums (Billboard)	41
Mexican Albums (AMPROFON)	93
US Billboard 200	50
US Top Jazz Albums (Billboard)	1

Chart (2015)	Position
Australian Jazz Albums (ARIA)	4
Belgian Albums (Ultratop Flanders)	196
Canadian Albums (Billboard)	50
US Billboard 200	125
US Top Album Sales (Billboard)	58
US Top Jazz Albums (Billboard)	1

Chart (2016)	Position
Australian Jazz Albums (ARIA)	8
US Top Jazz Albums (Billboard)	3

Chart (2017)	Position
Australian Jazz Albums (ARIA)	15

Chart (2018)	Position
Australian Jazz Albums (ARIA)	34

== Certification and sales ==
Certifications and sales for Cheek to Cheek
Region	Certification	Certified units/sales
Australia (ARIA)	Gold	35,000^{^}
Brazil (Pro-Música Brasil)	Platinum	40,000^{*}
Canada (Music Canada)	Platinum	80,000^{^}
France	—	40,000
United Kingdom (BPI)	Silver	60,000^{*}
United States (RIAA)	Gold	773,000
^{*} Sales figures based on certification alone.^{^} Shipments figures based on certification alone.

== Release history ==
Release dates and formats for Cheek to Cheek
Region	Date	Edition	Format	Label	Ref.
Australia	September 19, 2014	Standard; Deluxe	Digital download; CD	Interscope; Universal	
Germany	September 19, 2014	Standard; Deluxe	Digital download; CD	Interscope; Universal	
France	September 22, 2014	Standard; Deluxe	Digital download; CD	Polydor	
United Kingdom	September 22, 2014	Standard; Deluxe	Digital download; CD	Polydor	
Canada	September 23, 2014	Standard; Deluxe	Digital download; CD	Streamline; Columbia; Interscope	
Mexico	September 23, 2014	Standard; Deluxe	Digital download; CD	Streamline; Columbia; Interscope	
United States	September 23, 2014	Standard; Deluxe	Digital download; CD	Streamline; Columbia; Interscope	
Japan	September 24, 2014	Standard	SMH-CD	Universal	
United States	October 14, 2014	Standard	Vinyl	Interscope	
France	November 10, 2014	Standard	Vinyl	Polydor	
United States	December 31, 2014	Deluxe	Box set	Interscope	
France	March 9, 2015	Standard	Limited slipcase	Interscope	

== See also ==
- List of Billboard 200 number-one albums of 2014
