= Gent Jazz Festival =

Performing-arts festival in Ghent, Belgium

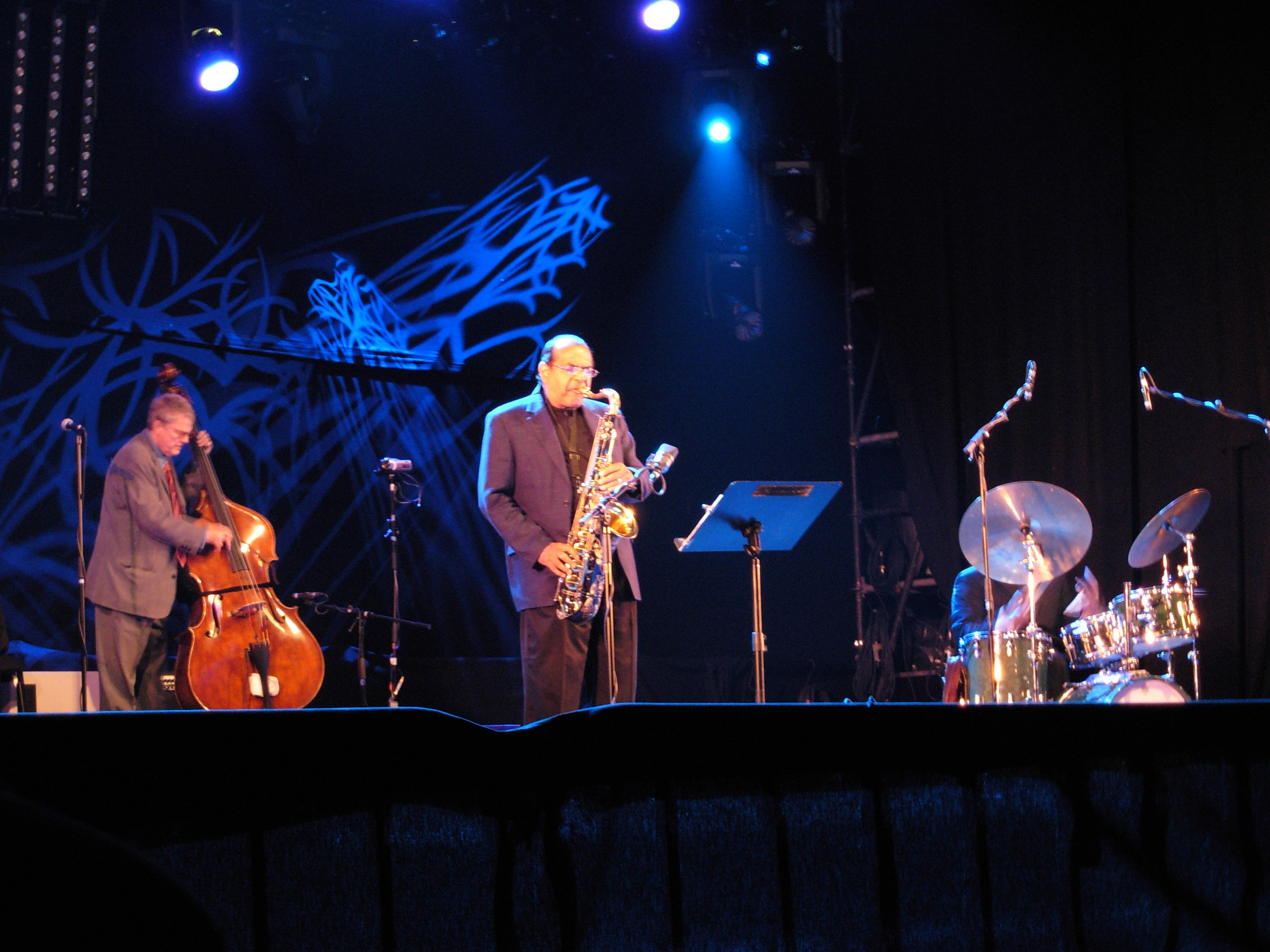
- Charlie Haden at Blue Note Festival 2007
- Genre: Performing arts festival
- Date: 5–25 July 2024
- Frequency: Annually
- Locations: Ghent, Belgium
- Coordinates: 51°03′21.32″N 3°43′37.18″E
- Years active: 20 July 2002 – present
- Inaugurated: 20 July 2002; 24 years ago
- Participants: See lineups
- Attendance: 57,000 (2024)
- Website: https://www.gentjazz.com/

The Gent Jazz Festival is an international jazz festival held annually in Ghent, Belgium in mid July. It lasts two weeks and the program is divided in two parts: the first week, called All That Jazz., unites some of the best jazz performers in the world while the second week, named All That Jazz?, gathers groups playing music related to jazz, e.g. soul music and electronic music.

== History ==
Gent Jazz was first organized in 2002, then still under the name Blue Note Festival. The festival then took place in the Gravensteen and at the Bijloke. Since 2003, everything has been situated at De Bijloke. In 2006, the name changed to Blue Note Festival to take on the name Gent Jazz Festival in 2008.

In 2022, the festival almost went bankrupt due to financial mismanagement. But Greenhouse Talent did not want to see Gent Jazz disappear and arranged for a relaunch. With success, in 2023 there were about 42,000 visitors. 3 extra festival days were added the following year.

== Lineups ==
2002: Abdullah Ibrahim, Elvin Jones, Toots Thielemans, John Scofield, Orlando Cachaito Lopéz, Erik Truffaz, Maceo Parker

2003: Herbie Hancock, John Zorn, Dianne Reeves, Patricia Barber, Candy Dulfer, Marcus Miller, The Cinematic Orchestra

2004: George Clinton, Angie Stone, Marc Moulin, Joe Lovano, Hank Jones, John McLauglin, Wynton Marsalis, Branford Marsalis, Ahmad Jamal

2005: Headlines: Dave Holland Big Band, John Scofield Trio, McCoy Tyner All Stars, Dee Dee Bridgewater, Philip Catherine and Charlie Haden feat. Gonzalo Rubalcaba for the first week. Vaya Con Dios, The Herbaliser, Erik Truffaz and Buena Vista Social Club presents Omara Portuondo for the second week.

2006: Dianne Reeves, John Zorn, Charles Lloyd, Wayne Shorter, Madredeus, Mariza, Toots Thielemans, Dr. John, Madeleine Peyroux, Sergio Mendes, Cesária Évora, Los Van Van, Us3, Maceo Parker

2007: Toots Thielemans, Kenny Werner, Chick Corea, Wynton Marsalis, Charlie Haden, DJ Shadow, Amon Tobin, India.Arie, Sly & The Family Stone, Elvis Costello, Guru's Jazzmatazz, Willy Deville, Allen Toussaint, Archie Shepp, Rashied Ali

2008: Herbie Hancock, Pat Metheny, Diana Krall, Wayne Shorter, Erykah Badu, Orquesta Buena Vista Social Club, The Neville Brothers, CocoRosie

2009: B.B. King, Dianne Reeves, McCoy Tyner, George Benson, Brad Mehldau, Richard Galliano, Jamie Lidell, Rodrigo y Gabriela, Joe Jackson, Marianne Faithfull, Melody Gardot, Jamie Cullum

2010: Norah Jones, Ornette Coleman, Chick Corea, Toots Thielemans, Pat Metheny, Mariza, Gilberto Gil, Kruder & Dorfmeister, Madness, Joe Bonamassa

2011: Sonny Rollins, B.B. King, Return to Forever feat. Chick Corea, Al Di Meola, Angus & Julia Stone

2012: Paco de Lucia, Melody Gardot, Brad Mehldau Trio, Wayne Shorter, Antony and the Johnsons, Damien Rice, Tindersticks, Rodrigo y Gabriela, D'Angelo, Jim Hall

2013: Joe Lovano with the Brussels Jazz Orchestra, Dee Dee Bridgewater & Ramsey Lewis, Diana Krall, John Zorn, Bryan Ferry feat. The Bryan Ferry Orchestra, Bobby Womack, Madeleine Peyroux, Avishai Cohen Quartet, Jamie Cullum, Valerie June, Elvis Costello & The Imposters, Wofo

2014: Ludovico Einaudi, Bobby McFerrin, Charles Bradley, Chick Corea & Stanley Clarke, Michael Kiwanuka, José James, Ibrahim Maalouf, Dave Holland, BadBadNotGood, Ólafur Arnalds, Agnes Obel

2015: Tony Bennett & Lady Gaga, Van Morrison, Zaz, Ginger Baker Jazz Confusion, Neneh Cherry, Charles Lloyd, Gregory Porter, Bill Laswell, Gary Clark Jr., Jack DeJohnette, Abdullah Ibrahim, Rodrigo y Gabriela, Laura Mvula

2016: Jill Scott, Lianne La Havas, Kamasi Washington, Ibrahim Maalouf, Pat Metheny, Max Richter, John Cale, Balthazar, St Germain, Ibeyi, Perfume Genius

2017: Herbie Hancock, Grace Jones, Wayne Shorter Quartet, Peter Doherty, Trixie Whitley, Kamasi Washington / STUFF, Einstürzende Neubauten

2018: The Roots, Tom Jones, David Byrne, Hudson, Melanie De Biasio, Pharoah Sanders, Selah Sue, Lady Linn, Jef Neve, Isolde XL

2019: Jamie Cullum, Gregory Porter, Yann Tiersen, Mulatu Astatke, Joan Baez, John Zorn, Jasper Steverlinck, STUFF

2022: Sting, Van Morrison, Agnes Obel, Kae Tempest, Daniel Lanois, Ibrahim Malouf, Gogo Penguin, Archie Shepp & Jason Moran, Charles Lloyd & Bill Frisell, Melody Gardot, Novastar, Avishia Cohen Trio, Christian McBride, Youn Sun Nah

2023: Norah Jones, Gregory Porter, Snarky Puppy, Joe Bonamassa, Branford Marsalis Quartet, ZAZ, Marcus Miller, Mavis Staples, Isolde Lasoen, Lara Rosseel, Laufey, Dishwasher

2024: Nile Rodgers & Chic, Patrick Bruel, Air, Melanie de Biasio, Alfa Mist, André 3000, Jamie Cullum, The Cinematic Orchestra, Sofiane Pamart, Diana Krall, Birdy, Laufey, Joshua Redman Group
