= Anything Goes (Cole Porter song) =

Show tune from the 1934 musical of the same name

"Anything Goes" is a song written by Cole Porter for his 1934 musical of the same name. Many of the lyrics include humorous references to figures of scandal and gossip from American high society during the Great Depression.

A recording by Paul Whiteman and his Orchestra (vocal by Ramona Davies), released in November 1934, reached no. 5 in the US charts in early 1935.

== People and items referenced in the song ==
The song opens with a reference to the Plymouth Colony:

Times have changed,
And we've often rewound the clock
Since the Puritans got a shock,
When they landed on Plymouth Rock.
If today,
any shock they should try to stem,
'Stead of landing on Plymouth Rock
Plymouth Rock would land on them.

The opening stanza influenced the orations of Malcolm X, who in 1964 said "Our forefathers were not the Pilgrims, we didn't land on Plymouth Rock, the rock was landed on us."

The song mentions Mae West, Hollywood sex symbol, and Missus Ned McLean (Evalyn Walsh McLean), who had traveled to the Soviet Union early after the Russian Revolution in an attempt to have a Tsarist relative reappointed Ambassador to the United States. Also mentioned are industrialist John D. Rockefeller, producer Max Gordon, the Vanderbilts, the Whitneys, and prominent tastemaker Lady Mendl.

One couplet refers to Samuel Goldwyn's box-office failure Nana starring Anna Sten, whose English was said to be incomprehensible to all except Goldwyn. (Goldwyn was from Poland and Sten from Ukraine.) The final stanza references an advertisement that Eleanor Roosevelt had done for a bed company.

== Later recordings ==
=== 1950s–80s ===
- Frank Sinatra recorded the song for Capitol from October 17, 1955, to January 16, 1956. His version was included on Songs for Swingin' Lovers! in March 1956.
- Almost simultaneously, Chris Connor recorded the song on either January 23 or February 8 on her first album for Atlantic.
- Also in 1956, Ella Fitzgerald released the first of two versions. Recorded between February 7 and March 27 of the same year for Verve, her first version was released on Ella Fitzgerald Sings the Cole Porter Songbook. In 1972, Atlantic released Ella Loves Cole. This second version was arranged by Nelson Riddle.
- Also on the Verve label, Stan Getz and Gerry Mulligan released an instrumental rendition of the song in 1957 on their album Getz Meets Mulligan in Hi-Fi on which they switched instruments.
- Pat Suzuki recorded it on her self-titled album, Pat Suzuki in 1958.
- Tony Bennett first recorded the song on January 3 or 5, 1959, with the Count Basie Orchestra for Roulette. The recording was released on Basie Swings, Bennett Sings, also known as Strike Up the Band.
- The Dave Brubeck Quartet recorded the song for the 1966 album Anything Goes! The Dave Brubeck Quartet Plays Cole Porter; Brubeck and his quartet recorded their version of the song between December 8, 1965, and February 17, 1966, for Columbia.
- The song was recorded by Harpers Bizarre on their 1967 album of the same name. Released as a single, group's version peaked at no. 43 on the Billboard pop singles chart and at no. 6 on the Adult Contemporary.
- Almost two decades later, the song was partially translated into Mandarin Chinese for the 1984 film Indiana Jones and the Temple of Doom, presumably with some assistance from John Williams, who arranged the film score. The song is performed by Kate Capshaw's character as the film's opening scene. The song is performed with a number of synchronized dancers in a large cabaret number set in a Shanghai night club circa 1935. The song is included on the original film soundtrack.
- The 1982 Royal Variety Performance featured Peter Skellern performing the song.
- Patti LuPone performed and recorded the song for the Lincoln Center's 1987 production of the musical, in which she played Reno Sweeney. She also performed the song at the 1988 Tony Awards.

=== 1990s–present ===
There have been other cast recordings.

- John Barrowman performed the song in the 2003 West End revival; his performance was released on Anything Goes (2003 National Theatre's London Cast Recording).
- Sutton Foster, with Company, also performed the song in the 2011 Broadway revival; the performance is included Anything Goes Sondheim Theatre Broadway Cast Recording. This cast recording, from the 2011 revival, debuted at number 1 on Billboard's Cast Album Chart.
- As a recurring cast member of the Fox television series Glee, Lindsay Pearce performed the song in a mashup with the show tune "Anything You Can Do" written by Irving Berlin for the Broadway musical Annie Get Your Gun. She performed the mashup during the season three episode "The Purple Piano Project" that was broadcast on September 20, 2011. The single peaked at no. 185 on the UK Singles Chart.
- In 2018, Ashleigh Murray performed the song in an episode of the third season of the television series Riverdale.
- In the American remake of Ghosts episode "A Star Is Dead" Rose McIver as performed the song.

== Tony Bennett and Lady Gaga version ==
"Anything Goes"

Single by Tony Bennett and Lady Gaga

from the album Cheek to Cheek
- Released: July 29, 2014
- Recorded: 2013
- Studio: KAS Music and Sound (Astoria, NY); Kaufman Astoria Studios (Astoria, NY); Manhattan Center Studios (New York, NY); Avatar (New York, New York)
- Genre: Jazz
- Length: 2:03
- Label: Streamline; Columbia; Interscope
- Songwriter: Cole Porter
- Producer: Dae Bennett

Tony Bennett singles chronology
"Don't Get Around Much Anymore" (2011)	"Anything Goes" (2014)	"I Can't Give You Anything but Love" (2014)

Lady Gaga singles chronology
"G.U.Y." (2014)	"Anything Goes" (2014)	"I Can't Give You Anything but Love" (2014)

Studio video
- "Anything Goes" on YouTube

=== Recording and release ===
Tony Bennett and Lady Gaga recorded "Anything Goes" for their collaborative studio album Cheek to Cheek (2014). The recording took place over a year in New York City. Bennett's quartet was present, including Mike Renzi, Gray Sargent, Harold Jones, and Marshall Wood as well as pianist Tom Lanier. With Marion Evans, jazz trumpeter Brian Newman, a long-time friend and colleague of Gaga, played on the album. Tenor saxophonist Joe Lovano and flautist Paul Horn performed. "Anything Goes" was released as the album's lead single on July 29, 2014, through digital retailers. Photographer Steven Klein shot the album cover artwork, depicting Gaga and Bennett in a newspaper-style cutout. A music video was subsequently uploaded to Gaga's YouTube and Vevo accounts, featuring Bennett and Gaga recording "Anything Goes" and other tracks from Cheek to Cheek.

=== Reception ===
Howard Reich of Chicago Tribune gave a positive review, saying found Gaga to be in "good voice" and Bennett in "classic form". Bree Jackson at V magazine called the song a "fresh take" on the original. MTV News critic Gil Kaufman said, "Gaga is clearly having a blast, doing her best Broadway belting with tons of energy and enthusiasm". The recording was described by Bobby Olivier of The Star-Ledger as "smooth as silk...Gaga's voice, when stripped of its bells and whistles, showcases a timelessness that lends itself well to the genre." Alexa Camp at Slant Magazine called Gaga's performance "blatantly affected, marred by shouting and clichéd phrasing." Edwin McFee at Hot Press called the song "tawdry" and "stale". "Gaga attempting to out-sing Bennett was a terribly misguided decision". The song received a nomination for Record Production/Single or Track at the 30th Annual TEC Awards under the category of Outstanding Creative Achievement Awards.

In the United Kingdom, "Anything Goes" debuted at number 174 on the UK Singles Chart for the week ending August 9, 2014. It also charted at number 132 on the sales chart of the Official Charts Company. In Spain it debuted within the top-fifty of the PROMUSICAE singles chart at number 40. "Anything Goes" debuted outside the top 100 of the French Singles Chart, at number 178. On the Billboard Jazz Digital Songs chart, the track debuted at the top, becoming Gaga's second entry on that chart, following "The Lady is a Tramp". The song was Bennett's 15th entry on the Jazz Digital Songs chart, and his third number-one single. According to Nielsen SoundScan, "Anything Goes" sold 16,000 digital downloads in the US up to the week ending August 3, 2014. The song dropped to number three on Jazz Digital Songs chart the next week but moved back to number two the week after.

=== Charts ===
Weekly chart performance for "Anything Goes"
Chart (2014)	Peak position
Belgium (Ultratip Bubbling Under Flanders)	53
Belgium (Ultratip Bubbling Under Wallonia)	39
France (SNEP)	178
Italy (FIMI)	65
Japan (Billboard Japan Hot 100)	44
Mexico (Billboard Mexican Airplay)	22
Russia Airplay (Tophit)	223
Spain (Promusicae)	40
UK Singles (Official Charts Company)	174
US Jazz Digital Songs (Billboard)	1

Annual chart rankings for "Anything Goes"
Chart (2014)	Rank
Japan Adult Contemporary (Billboard)	50

=== Release history ===
Release dates and formats for "Anything Goes"
Region	Date	Format	Label	Ref.
Various	July 29, 2014	Digital download	Streamline; Columbia; Interscope	
Italy	July 29, 2014	Radio airplay	Universal	

== In popular culture ==
- "Anything Goes" is played on Galaxy News Radio, a fictional radio station, in the post-apocalyptic video game Fallout 3, as well as Diamond City Radio in the next installment, Fallout 4, and Appalachia Radio in the game Fallout 76.
