= Grammy Award for Best Traditional Pop Vocal Album =

Honor presented to recording artists for quality traditional pop vocal albums

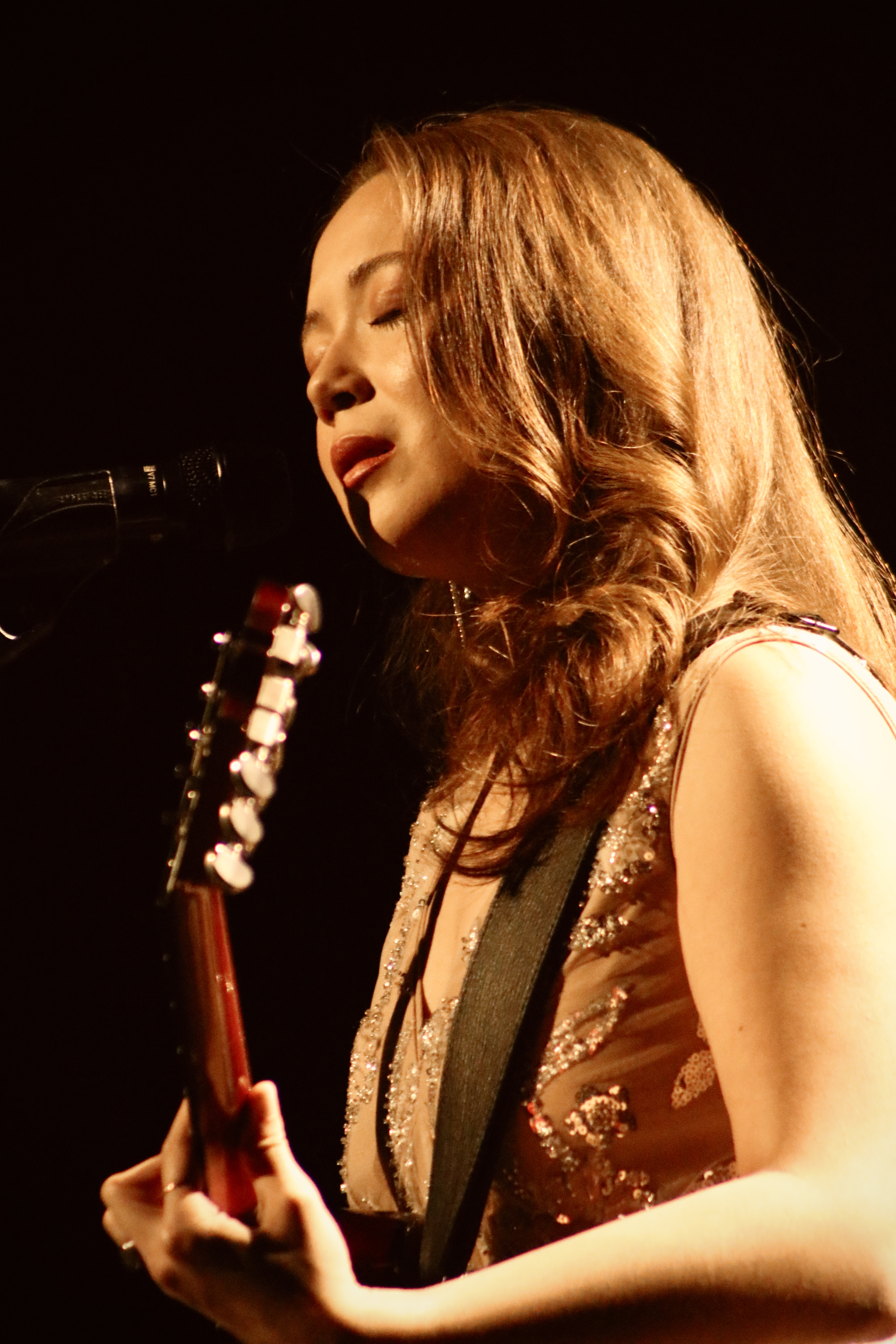
- Laufey, current recipient for A Matter of Time
- Awarded for: Quality albums containing 51% or more playing time of vocal tracks in the "traditional" genre (Great American Songbook)
- Country: United States
- Presented by: National Academy of Recording Arts and Sciences
- First award: 1992
- Currently held by: Laufey – A Matter of Time (2026)

Highlights
- Most wins: Tony Bennett (14)
- Most nominations: Tony Bennett (17)
- Website: grammy.com

The Grammy Award for Best Traditional Pop Vocal Album is an award presented to recording artists at the Grammy Awards, a ceremony that was established in 1958 and originally called the Gramophone Awards. Honors in several categories are presented at the ceremony annually by the National Academy of Recording Arts and Sciences of the United States to "honor artistic achievement, technical proficiency and overall excellence in the recording industry, without regard to album sales or chart position".

The award has been presented every year since 1992, though it has had two name changes throughout its history. In 1992 the award was known as Best Traditional Pop Performance, from 1993 to 2000 the award was known as Best Traditional Pop Vocal Performance, and since 2001 it has been awarded as Best Traditional Pop Vocal Album. Apart from the first year it was presented, the award has been designated for "albums containing 51% or more playing time of vocal tracks", with "traditional" referring to the "composition, vocal styling, and the instrumental arrangement" of the body of music known as the Great American Songbook.

The 1992 award was presented to Natalie Cole for the spliced-together duet of her and her father, Nat King Cole, performing his original recording of "Unforgettable". This is the only instance in which the traditional pop award was awarded for a song, as opposed to an album. Prior to 2001, the Grammy was presented to the performing artists only; since then the award has been given to the performing artists, the engineers/mixers, as well as the producers, provided they worked on more than 51 percent of playing time on the album. Producers and engineers who worked on less than 50 percent of playing time of the album, as well as mastering engineers do not win an award, but can apply for a Winners Certificate. However, the lead performing artist remains the only one to receive an official nomination. Eligibility criteria for the category was expanded in 2025 to welcome more entries from the musical theater community, and it was mandated that albums must contain more than 75% of newly recorded and previously unreleased material.

== Recipients ==
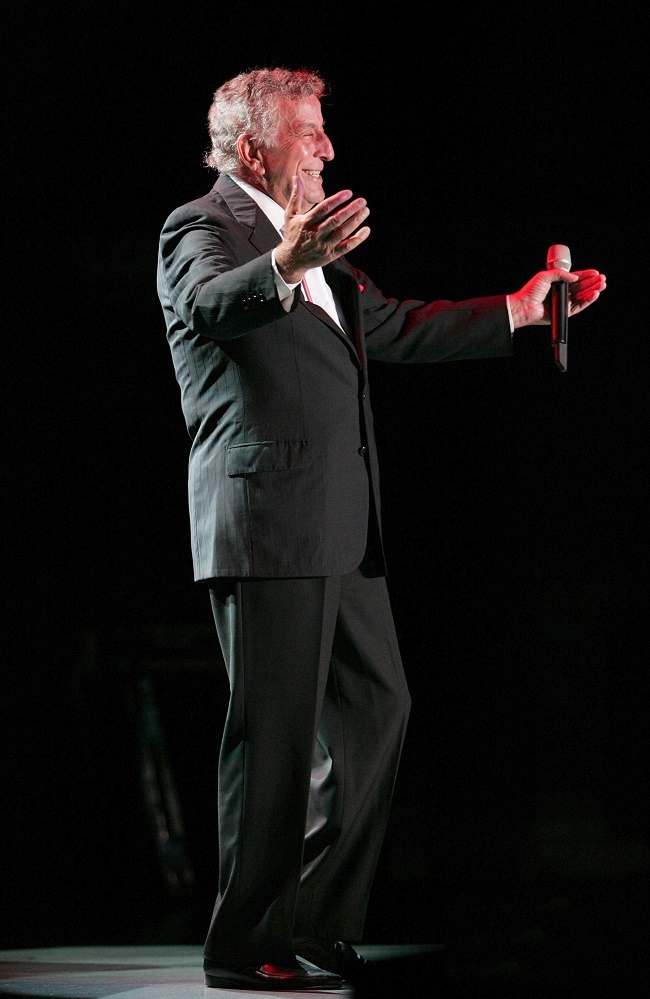
Fourteen-time award winner Tony Bennett

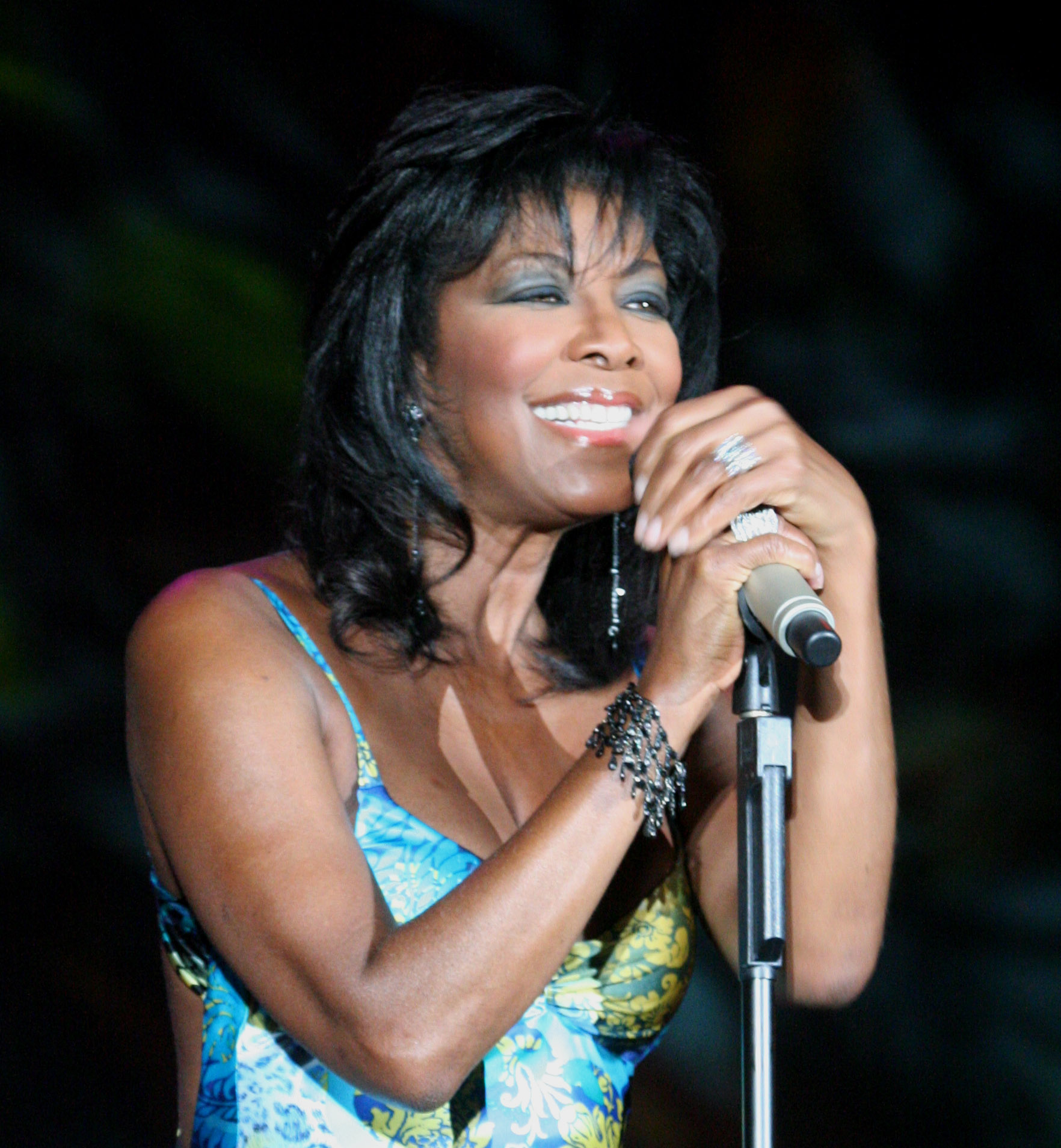
Two-time award winner Natalie Cole

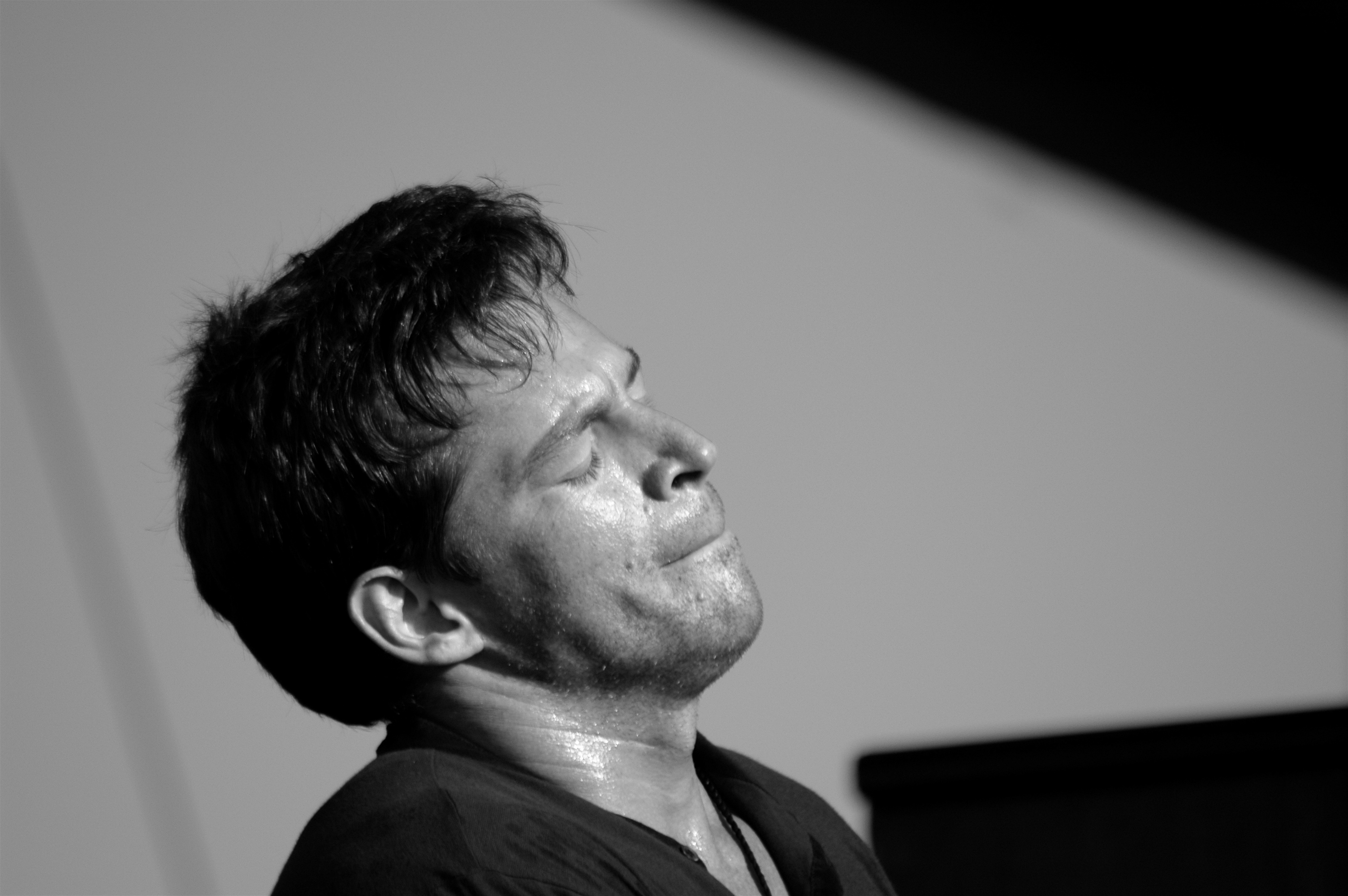
2002 award winner, Harry Connick Jr., performing in 2007

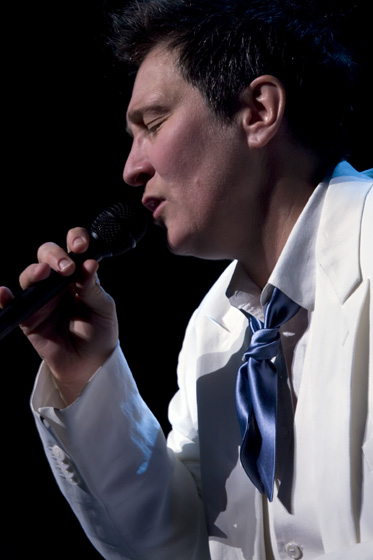
2004 award winner, k.d. lang, performing in 2008

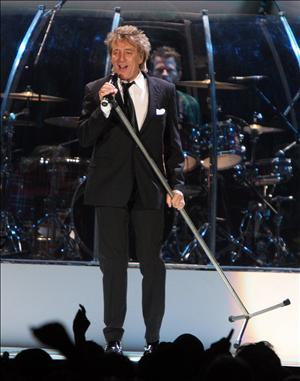
2005 award winner, Rod Stewart

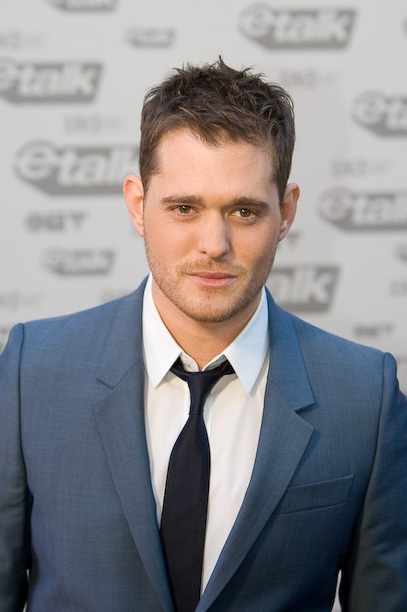
Five-time award winner Michael Bublé at the Juno Awards of 2009

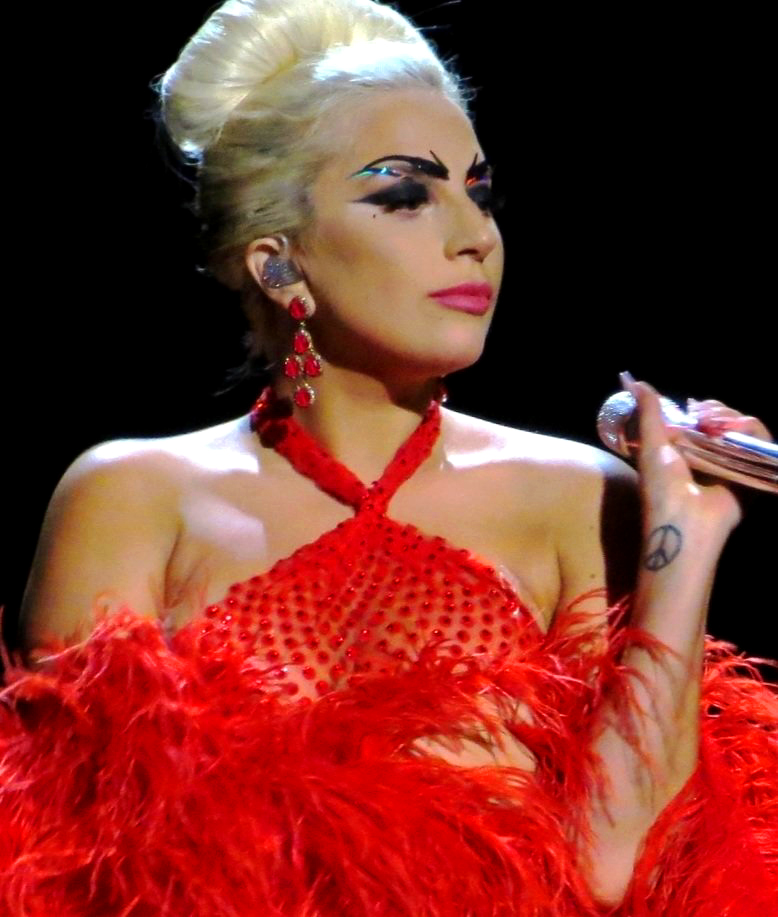
Two-time award winner Lady Gaga

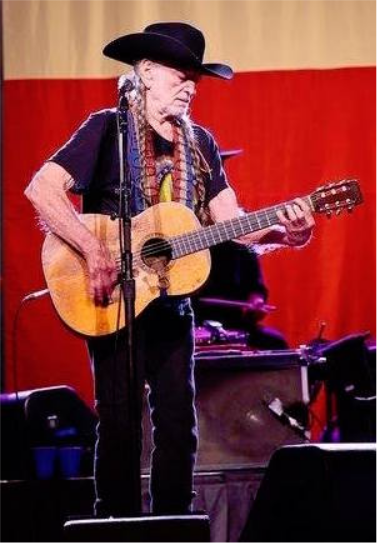
Willie Nelson has won twice.

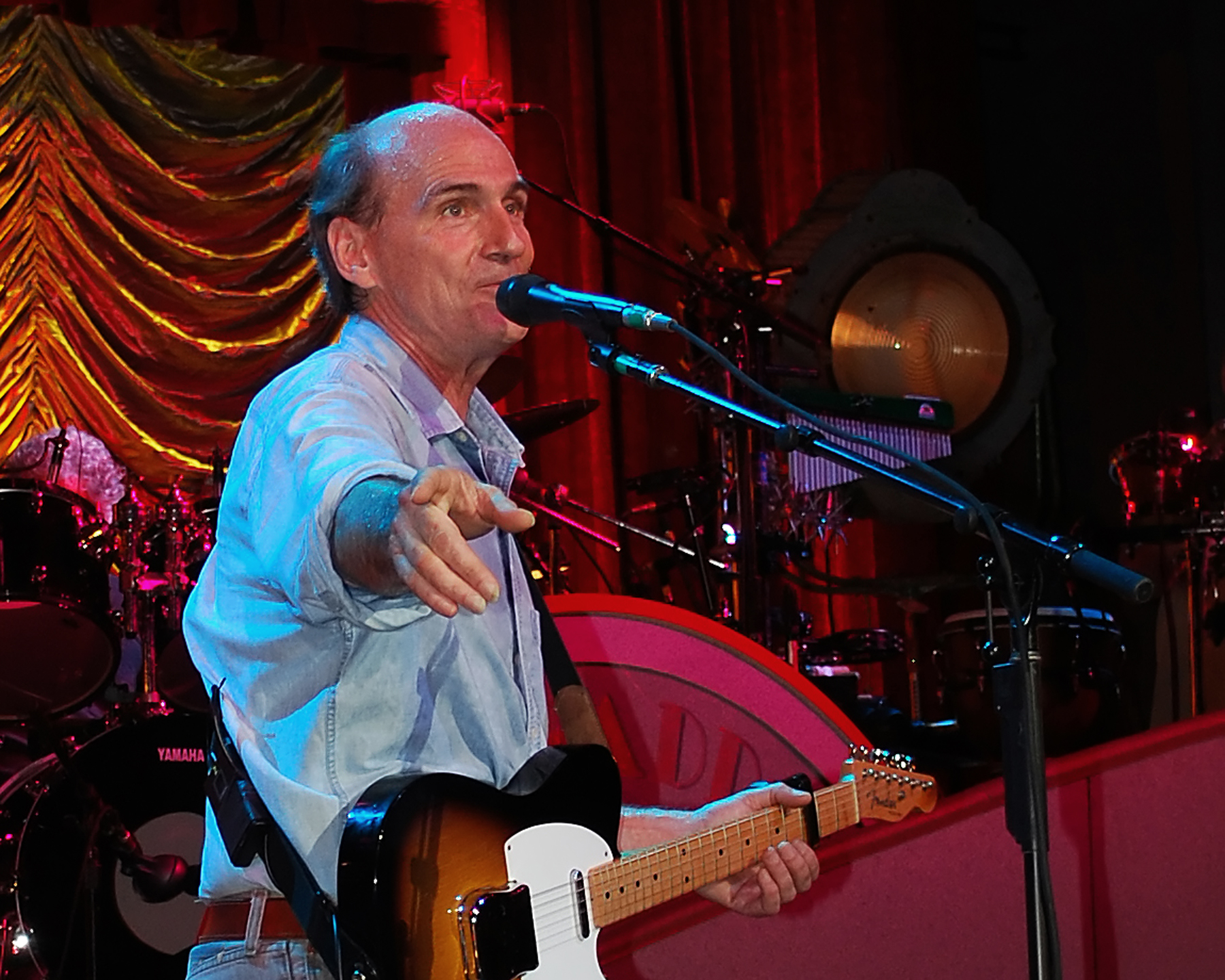
2021 recipient James Taylor

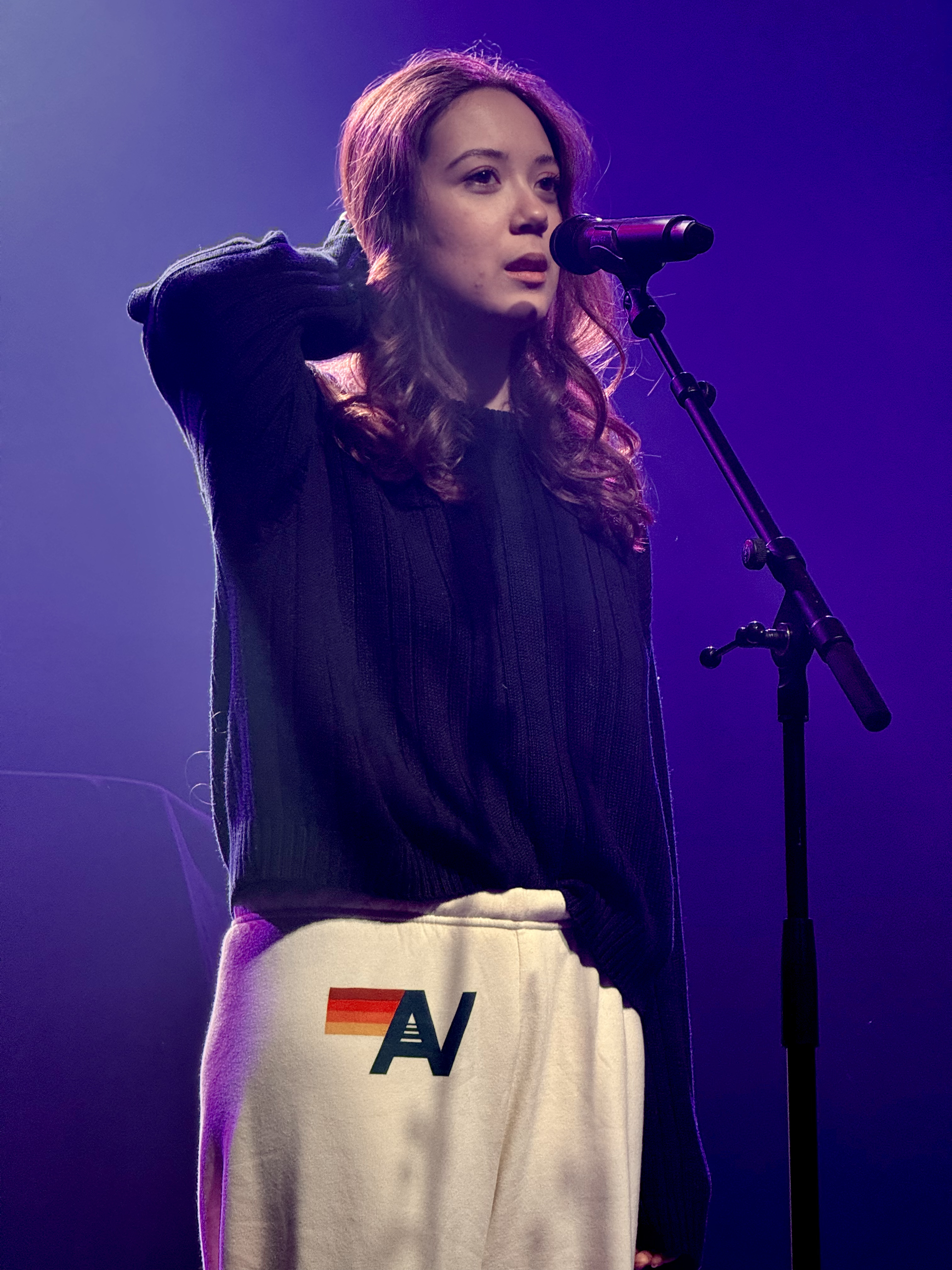
Two-time award winner Laufey

=== 1990s ===
Year	Work	Artist
1992	Unforgettable	Natalie Cole
1992	Blue Light, Red Light	Harry Connick Jr.
1992	In a Sentimental Mood: Mathis Sings Ellington	Johnny Mathis
1992	Pure Schuur	Diane Schuur
1992	"Warm All Over"	Barbra Streisand
1993	Perfectly Frank	Tony Bennett
1993	Girl Singer	Rosemary Clooney
1993	Late Night at the Cafe Carlyle	Bobby Short
1993	Michael Feinstein Sings the Jule Styne Songbook	Michael Feinstein
1993	With My Lover Beside Me	Nancy Wilson
1994	Steppin' Out	Tony Bennett
1994	Back to Broadway	Barbra Streisand
1994	Do You Miss New York?	Rosemary Clooney
1994	Love Songs	Diane Schuur
1994	A Touch of Music in the Night	Michael Crawford
1995	MTV Unplugged: Tony Bennett	Tony Bennett
1995	The Concert	Barbra Streisand
1995	Duets	Frank Sinatra
1995	Moonlight Becomes You	Willie Nelson
1995	Roberta	Roberta Flack
1996	Duets II	Frank Sinatra
1996	Back in Business	Eartha Kitt
1996	Broadway Legend	John Raitt
1996	Broadway: The Music of Richard Rodgers	Julie Andrews
1996	Demi-Centennial	Rosemary Clooney
1997	Here's to the Ladies	Tony Bennett
1997	Dedicated to Nelson	Rosemary Clooney
1997	Gently	Liza Minnelli
1997	I'll Be Your Baby Tonight	Bernadette Peters
1997	Stardust	Natalie Cole
1998	Tony Bennett on Holiday	Tony Bennett
1998	Film Noir	Carly Simon
1998	Here I'll Stay	Julie Andrews
1998	Mothers & Daughters	Rosemary Clooney
1998	Sondheim, etc.	Bernadette Peters
1999	Live at Carnegie Hall: The 50th Anniversary Concert	Patti Page
1999	The Birthday Concert	Shirley Bassey
1999	Jack Jones Paints a Tribute to Tony Bennett	Jack Jones
1999	Michael & George: Feinstein Sings Gershwin	Michael Feinstein
1999	The Pleasure of His Company	Maureen McGovern

=== 2000s ===
Year	Work	Artist
2000	Bennett Sings Ellington: Hot & Cool	Tony Bennett
2000	Come by Me	Harry Connick Jr.
2000	Manilow Sings Sinatra	Barry Manilow
2000	The Movie Album: As Time Goes By	Neil Diamond
2000	You're the Top: Love Song of Cole Porter	Bobby Short
2001	Both Sides Now	Joni Mitchell
2001	As Time Goes By	Bryan Ferry
2001	It's Like This	Rickie Lee Jones
2001	Songs from the Last Century	George Michael
2001	Timeless: Live in Concert	Barbra Streisand
2002	Songs I Heard	Harry Connick Jr.
2002	Keely Sings Sinatra	Keely Smith
2002	Romance on Film, Romance on Broadway	Michael Feinstein
2002	Stars and the Moon: Live at the Donmar	Betty Buckley
2002	Sentimental Journey: The Girl Singer and Her New Big Band	Rosemary Clooney
2003	Playin' with My Friends: Bennett Sings the Blues	Tony Bennett
2003	Bernadette Peters Loves Rodgers & Hammerstein	Bernadette Peters
2003	Christmas Memories	Barbra Streisand
2003	It Had to Be You: The Great American Songbook	Rod Stewart
2003	Michael Feinstein with the Israel Philharmonic Orchestra	Michael Feinstein
2004	A Wonderful World	Tony Bennett and k.d. lang
2004	As Time Goes By: The Great American Songbook, Volume II	Rod Stewart
2004	Bette Midler Sings the Rosemary Clooney Songbook	Bette Midler
2004	The Last Concert	Rosemary Clooney
2004	The Movie Album	Barbra Streisand
2005	Stardust: The Great American Songbook, Volume III	Rod Stewart
2005	Count Your Blessings	Barbara Cook
2005	Just for a Thrill	Ronnie Milsap
2005	Only You	Harry Connick Jr.
2005	Ultimate Mancini	Monica Mancini
2006	The Art of Romance	Tony Bennett
2006	Isn't It Romantic	Johnny Mathis
2006	It's Time	Michael Bublé
2006	Moonlight Serenade	Carly Simon
2006	Thanks for the Memory: The Great American Songbook, Volume IV	Rod Stewart
2007	Duets: An American Classic	Tony Bennett
2007	Bette Midler Sings the Peggy Lee Songbook	Bette Midler
2007	Caught in the Act	Michael Bublé
2007	Timeless Love	Smokey Robinson
2007	Wintersong	Sarah McLachlan
2008	Call Me Irresponsible	Michael Bublé
2008	Cool Yule	Bette Midler
2008	James Taylor at Christmas	James Taylor
2008	Live in Concert 2006	Barbra Streisand
2008	Trav'lin' Light	Queen Latifah
2009	Still Unforgettable	Natalie Cole
2009	In the Swing of Christmas	Barry Manilow
2009	Noël	Josh Groban
2009	Rufus Does Judy at Carnegie Hall	Rufus Wainwright
2009	The Sinatra Project	Michael Feinstein

=== 2010s ===
Year	Work	Artist
2010	Michael Bublé Meets Madison Square Garden	Michael Bublé
2010	American Classic	Willie Nelson
2010	Liza's at The Palace....	Liza Minnelli
2010	A Swingin' Christmas	Tony Bennett
2010	Your Songs	Harry Connick Jr.
2011	Crazy Love	Michael Bublé
2011	Fly Me to the Moon... The Great American Songbook Volume V	Rod Stewart
2011	The Greatest Love Songs of All Time	Barry Manilow
2011	Let It Be Me: Mathis in Nashville	Johnny Mathis
2011	Love Is the Answer	Barbra Streisand
2012	Duets II	Tony Bennett
2012	The Gift	Susan Boyle
2012	In Concert on Broadway	Harry Connick Jr.
2012	Music Is Better Than Words	Seth MacFarlane
2012	What Matters Most	Barbra Streisand
2013	Kisses on the Bottom	Paul McCartney
2013	Christmas	Michael Bublé
2013	A Holiday Carole	Carole King
2014	To Be Loved	Michael Bublé
2014	Cee Lo's Magic Moment	Cee Lo Green
2014	Now	Dionne Warwick
2014	The Standards	Gloria Estefan
2014	Viva Duets	Tony Bennett with various artists
2015	Cheek to Cheek	Tony Bennett and Lady Gaga
2015	Night Songs	Barry Manilow
2015	Nostalgia	Annie Lennox
2015	Partners	Barbra Streisand with various artists
2015	Sending You a Little Christmas	Johnny Mathis
2016	The Silver Lining: The Songs of Jerome Kern	Tony Bennett and Bill Charlap
2016	My Dream Duets	Barry Manilow with various artists
2016	No One Ever Tells You	Seth MacFarlane
2016	Shadows in the Night	Bob Dylan
2016	Stages	Josh Groban
2017	Summertime: Willie Nelson Sings Gershwin	Willie Nelson
2017	Cinema	Andrea Bocelli
2017	Encore: Movie Partners Sing Broadway	Barbra Streisand
2017	Fallen Angels	Bob Dylan
2017	Stages Live	Josh Groban
2018	Tony Bennett Celebrates 90	Various Artists (Dae Bennett, producer)^{[II]}
2018	In Full Swing	Seth MacFarlane
2018	Nobody but Me	Michael Bublé
2018	Triplicate	Bob Dylan
2018	Wonderland	Sarah McLachlan
2019	My Way	Willie Nelson
2019	Love Is Here to Stay	Tony Bennett and Diana Krall
2019	The Music...The Mem'ries...The Magic!	Barbra Streisand
2019	Nat King Cole & Me	Gregory Porter
2019	Standards (Deluxe)	Seal

=== 2020s ===
Year	Work	Artist
2020	Look Now	Elvis Costello & The Imposters
2020	A Legendary Christmas	John Legend
2020	Love (Deluxe Edition)	Michael Bublé
2020	Sì	Andrea Bocelli
2020	Walls	Barbra Streisand
2021	American Standard	James Taylor
2021	Blue Umbrella	Burt Bacharach and Daniel Tashian
2021	Judy	Renée Zellweger
2021	True Love: A Celebration of Cole Porter	Harry Connick Jr.
2021	Unfollow the Rules	Rufus Wainwright
2022	Love for Sale	Tony Bennett and Lady Gaga
2022	A Holly Dolly Christmas	Dolly Parton
2022	Ledisi Sings Nina	Ledisi
2022	That's Life	Willie Nelson
2022	Til We Meet Again (Live)	Norah Jones
2022	A Tori Kelly Christmas	Tori Kelly
2023	Higher	Michael Bublé
2023	Evergreen	Pentatonix
2023	I Dream of Christmas (Extended)	Norah Jones
2023	Thank You	Diana Ross
2023	When Christmas Comes Around...	Kelly Clarkson
2024	Bewitched	Laufey
2024	Holidays Around the World	Pentatonix
2024	Only the Strong Survive	Bruce Springsteen
2024	Pieces of Treasure	Rickie Lee Jones
2024	Sondheim Unplugged (The NYC Sessions), Vol. 3	Various Artists
2024	To Steve with Love: Liz Callaway Celebrates Sondheim	Liz Callaway
2025	Visions	Norah Jones
2025	Christmas Wish	Gregory Porter
2025	À Fleur De Peau	Cyrille Aimée
2025	Good Together	Lake Street Dive
2025	Impossible Dream	Aaron Lazar
2026	A Matter of Time	Laufey
2026	The Gift of Love	Jennifer Hudson
2026	Harlequin	Lady Gaga
2026	The Secret of Life: Partners, Volume Two	Barbra Streisand
2026	Who Believes in Angels?	Elton John and Brandi Carlile
2026	Wintersongs	Laila Biali
2027	Better Broken	Sarah McLachlan
2027	The Boys of Dungeon Lane	Paul McCartney
2027	Good Grief	Sara Bareilles
2027	An Offering: Live at Speakeasy Studios	Leslie Odom Jr.
2027	Whatever's Clever!	Charlie Puth

- ^{^[I]} Each year is linked to the article about the Grammy Awards held that year.
- ^{^[II]} Award only went to a producer of the album, not the performing artist(s).

== Artists with multiple wins ==
14 wins

- Tony Bennett

5 wins

- Michael Bublé

2 wins

- Natalie Cole
- Willie Nelson
- Lady Gaga
- Laufey

== Artists with multiple nominations ==
17 nominations

- Tony Bennett

14 nominations

- Barbra Streisand

9 nominations

- Michael Bublé

7 nominations

- Rosemary Clooney

6 nominations

- Harry Connick Jr.

5 nominations

- Michael Feinstein
- Barry Manilow
- Rod Stewart

4 nominations

- Willie Nelson
- Johnny Mathis

3 nominations

- Natalie Cole
- Bob Dylan
- Lady Gaga
- Josh Groban
- Norah Jones
- Seth MacFarlane
- Sarah McLachlan
- Bette Midler
- Bernadette Peters

2 nominations

- Julie Andrews
- Laufey
- Rickie Lee Jones
- Paul McCartney
- Liza Minnelli
- Pentatonix
- Gregory Porter
- Diane Schuur
- Bobby Short
- Carly Simon
- Frank Sinatra
- James Taylor
- Rufus Wainwright

== See also ==
- Jazz standard
- Tin Pan Alley

== Sources ==
- "Past Winners Search". National Academy of Recording Arts and Sciences. Archived from the original on December 19, 2015. Note: User must select the "Traditional Pop" category as the genre under the search feature.
