= Me, Myself, and I (1937 song) =

"Me, Myself, and I" (sometimes "Me, Myself and I (Are All in Love with You)") is a song written by Irving Gordon with lyrics by Allan Roberts and Alvin S. Kaufman.

It was first recorded in 1937 by several artists including Billie Holiday and Her Orchestra, Benny Goodman and His Orchestra, Bob Howard and His Orchestra, and Dick Jurgens and His Orchestra with vocalist Eddy Howard. Other artists to record the song include Lester Young, Martha Tilton, Ruby Braff, Terry Blane and Tony Bennett, who included it in his 1997 Billie Holiday tribute album, On Holiday.
