= I Wished on the Moon =

Song by Teddy Wilson featuring Billie Holiday
- Released: August 1935
- Recorded: July 2, 1935
- Genre: Jazz
- Label: Brunswick Records
- Songwriters: Ralph Rainger, Dorothy Parker
- Composer: Ralph Rainger
- Lyricist: Dorothy Parker

"I Wished on the Moon" is a song composed by Ralph Rainger, with lyrics by Dorothy Parker. Bing Crosby sang the song in The Big Broadcast of 1936.

Crosby recorded the song on August 14, 1935, with The Dorsey Brothers Orchestra and it reached the charts of the day peaking at No. 2 during a seven-week stay. At the end of the long recording session, Crosby decided to sing only a single chorus of the song in the middle of an orchestral version instead of the full ballad treatment used in the film. This led to a long argument between the singer and producer Jack Kapp. Eventually Crosby prevailed. Crosby recorded the song again in 1954 for his album Bing: A Musical Autobiography.

Little Jack Little recorded the song for Columbia (catalog 3068) on June 28, 1935, and also enjoyed chart success with the song in 1935 reaching the No. 13 spot. Ruth Etting also recorded the song for Columbia (3070) on July 1, 1935.

== Other notable recordings ==
- Teddy Wilson featuring Billie Holiday on Brunswick, catalog 7501, recorded on July 2, 1935.
- Ray Noble and His Orchestra featuring Al Bowlly recorded on July 20, 1935. (Al Bowlly Discography).
- Patti Page - And I Thought About You (1955)
- Ella Fitzgerald and Gordon Jenkins recorded March 24, 1954, on Decca, a 1955 release, catalog No. 29137, also recorded again in 1961 for the album Ella Swings Gently with Nelson.
- Billie Holiday - Songs for Distingué Lovers (1957)
- Billy Eckstine - Billy Eckstine's Imagination (1958)
- June Christy - The Song Is June! (1958)
- Gogi Grant - Granted It's Gogi (1960)
- Mel Tormé - Swingin' On the Moon (1960)
- Art Pepper - Intensity (1960)
- Johnnie Ray - for his Liberty LP Johnnie Ray (1962)
- Roland Kirk - Here Comes the Whistleman (1965)
- Frank Sinatra and Nelson Riddle - Moonlight Sinatra (1966)
- Rosemary Clooney - Rosie Sings Bing (1978)
- Tony Bennett - Perfectly Frank (1992), Tony Bennett on Holiday. (1997)
- Red Richards - My Romance (1993)^{[24]}
- Teddi King - In the Beginning, 1949-1954 (2000 compilation)
- Diana Krall - This Dream of You (2020)
- Joy Oladokun - I Wished on the Moon (The New Look: Season 1) (2024)
