= Astoria: Portrait of the Artist =

Studio album by Tony Bennett
- Released: February 27, 1990
- Recorded: May 16–18, 1989
- Genre: Vocal jazz
- Length: 47:13
- Label: Columbia
- Producer: Danny Bennett

Tony Bennett chronology
Bennett/Berlin (1987)	Astoria: Portrait of the Artist (1990)	Perfectly Frank (1992)

Professional ratings
Review scores
Source	Rating
Allmusic	4.5/5 stars

Astoria: Portrait of the Artist is a 1990 studio album by Tony Bennett. The title refers to Bennett's birthplace, Astoria, Queens.

On November 8, 2011, Sony Music Distribution included the CD in a box set entitled The Complete Collection.

== Track listing ==
1. "When Do the Bells Ring for Me?" (Charles DeForest) – 2:58
2. "I Was Lost, I Was Drifting" (Kim Gannon, Bronisław Kaper) – 3:54
3. "A Little Street Where Old Friends Meet" (Gus Kahn, Harry M. Woods) – 3:17
4. "The Girl I Love" ("The Man I Love") (George Gershwin, Ira Gershwin) – 4:17
5. "It's Like Reaching for the Moon" (Al Sherman, Al Lewis, Gerald Marqusee) – 2:28
6. "Speak Low" (Ogden Nash, Kurt Weill) – 3:43
7. "The Folks Who Live On the Hill" (Oscar Hammerstein II, Jerome Kern) – 3:58
8. "Antonia" (Jack Segal, Robert Wells) – 3:05
9. "A Weaver of Dreams"/"There Will Never Be Another You" (Jack Elliott, Victor Young)/(Mack Gordon, Harry Warren) – 2:42
10. "Body and Soul" (Frank Eyton, Johnny Green, Edward Heyman, Robert Sour) – 4:00
11. "Where Do You Go from Love?" (DeForest) – 3:03
12. "The Boulevard of Broken Dreams" (Al Dubin, Harry Warren) – 2:21
13. "Where Did the Magic Go?" (P.J. Erickson, Buddy Weed) – 4:50
14. "I've Come Home Again" (DeForest) – 2:32

== Personnel ==
- Tony Bennett – vocals
- Ralph Sharon – piano
