= Indian Summer (Victor Herbert song) =

Composition by Victor Herbert, lyrics by Al Dubin

"Indian Summer" is an American standard originally written as a piano piece by the prolific composer Victor Herbert. Al Dubin wrote lyrics for the tune in 1939, twenty years after Herbert wrote the tune.

Herbert composed the tune in 1919, but it did not become a standard until much later, after the lyrics were added. Sheet music exists for Everett Hoagland and Don Reid versions, dating to 1934 and 1939 respectively, but the provenance of the second of these, at least, is doubtful, as Reid may not even have formed an orchestra until 1944.

Dubin wrote his lyrics for the song in 1939, and in the same year Tommy Dorsey's orchestra had a number one hit with it on the Billboard singles chart.

== Covers ==
It was also recorded by the Glenn Miller Orchestra on November 5, 1939. Miller's version with vocalist Ray Eberle charted in 1940 for ten weeks, rising to number eight.

Also in 1940, Sidney Bechet recorded one of the first jazz versions of the tune, performing it on soprano sax. Another significant version is Coleman Hawkins' from 1945.

Perhaps some of "Indian Summer's" success as a jazz tune is that it "bears no European mark", being a "thirty-two measure song with the form of A-B-A-C. "The melody sings marvelously throughout without a single cliche or let down," composer and critic Alec Wilder wrote in American Popular Song: The Great Innovators, 1900–1950 (1972), despite admitting that he was generally no fan of Victor Herbert.

"Indian Summer" has been recorded by Bing Crosby (recorded February 7, 1951 for Decca Records), the Gene Krupa Orchestra, Richard Tauber, Ginny Simms, Paul Desmond, Ella Fitzgerald, Sarah Vaughan, Duke Ellington, Frank Sinatra with Duke Ellington (for the 1968 album Francis A. & Edward K.), Tony Bennett (for the 1992 tribute album to Sinatra titled Perfectly Frank), Tony Martin with orchestra conducted by Ray Sinatra, Decca 2936 in 1940; and Bobby Caldwell (for his 1999 album Come Rain or Come Shine). There are many other vocal versions, and in instrumental versions for saxophone, piano, and guitar.

In other recordings, instrumental versions have been covered by Joe Puma with sideman Bill Evans. Mrs. Mills recorded a version in 1968, on Parlophone R 5678, with Geoff Love and his Orchestra.
