= Bennett/Berlin =

Studio album by Tony Bennett
- Released: 1987
- Genre: Vocal jazz
- Length: 30:32
- Label: Columbia
- Producer: Danny Bennett

Tony Bennett chronology
The Art of Excellence (1986)	Bennett/Berlin (1987)	Astoria: Portrait of the Artist (1990)

Bennett/Berlin is an album by the American musician Tony Bennett, released in 1987. It is a tribute to Irving Berlin. Dizzy Gillespie, Dexter Gordon, and George Benson guested on the album.

Sony Music Distribution included the album in the 2011 box set The Complete Collection.

== Critical reception ==
Professional ratings
Review scores
Source	Rating
AllMusic	3/5 stars
The Philadelphia Inquirer	2/4 stars
The Rolling Stone Album Guide	4/5 stars

The Chicago Tribune wrote that Bennett's "wisdom, emotional insight and interpretative daring have grown by leaps and bounds." The Washington Post opined that "Bennett sounds relaxed, comfortable and affectionate toward the material, though his voice is noticeably weathered." The Philadelphia Inquirer praised the "aging hipster's cool confidence in his phrasing."

== Track listing ==
All songs were written by Irving Berlin.

1. "They Say It's Wonderful" - 2:02
2. "Isn't This a Lovely Day?" - 3:19
3. "All of My Life" - 4:37
4. "Now it Can Be Told" - 2:24
5. "The Song is Ended (but the Melody Lingers On)" - 2:59
6. "When I Lost You" - 1:13
7. "Cheek to Cheek" - 3:25
8. "Let Yourself Go" - 1:28
9. "Let's Face the Music and Dance" - 1:55
10. "Shaking the Blues Away" - 1:47
11. "Russian Lullaby" - 2:11
12. "White Christmas" - 3:05

== Personnel ==
- Tony Bennett – vocals, arranger
- Dizzy Gillespie – trumpet (tracks 5 and 11)
- Dexter Gordon – saxophone (tracks 3 and 12)
- Ralph Sharon – piano
- Paul Langosch – double bass
- George Benson – guitar (track 7)
- Joe LaBarbera – drums

Production

- Danny Bennett – producer
- Tom Chiappa – production coordination
- Dae Bennett – engineer
- Bob Ludwig – mastering
- Josephine DiDonato – artwork
- Annie Leibovitz – photography
