= Tony Bennett on Holiday =

Studio album by Tony Bennett
- Released: February 4, 1997
- Recorded: July–November 1996
- Genre: Traditional pop
- Label: Columbia
- Producer: Tony Bennett, Danny Bennett, Phil Ramone

Tony Bennett chronology
Here's to the Ladies (1995)	Tony Bennett on Holiday (1997)	The Playground (1998)

Professional ratings
Review scores
Source	Rating
AllMusic	3/5 stars

Tony Bennett on Holiday is a 1997 studio album by Tony Bennett, recorded in tribute to Billie Holiday.

In 1998 Bennett won his fifth Grammy Award for Best Traditional Pop Vocal Performance for his work on this album.

The final track, "God Bless the Child", was an electronically created "duet" with the long-dead Lady Day and Count Basie; it received poor notices, unlike the rest of the album.

On November 8, 2011, Sony Music Distribution included the CD in a box set entitled The Complete Collection.

== Track listing ==
1. "(In My) Solitude" (Eddie DeLange, Duke Ellington, Irving Mills) – 2:57
2. "All of Me" (Gerald Marks, Seymour Simons) – 1:44
3. "When a Woman Loves a Man" (Bernie Hanighen, Gordon Jenkins, Johnny Mercer) – 3:11
4. "Me, Myself and I" (Irving Gordon, Alan Kaufman, Allan Roberts) – 2:05
5. "She's Funny That Way (I Got a Woman, Crazy for Me)" (Neil Moret, Richard A. Whiting) – 4:20
6. "If I Could Be with You (One Hour Tonight)" (Henry Creamer, James P. Johnson) – 2:04
7. "Willow Weep for Me" (Ann Ronell) – 3:00
8. "Laughing at Life" (Nick A. Kenny, Charles Kenny, Cornell Todd, Bob Todd) – 3:26
9. "I Wished on the Moon" (Dorothy Parker, Ralph Rainger) – 2:46
10. "What a Little Moonlight Can Do" (Harry M. Woods) – 2:45
11. "My Old Flame" (Sam Coslow, Arthur Johnston) – 2:55
12. "That Ole Devil Called Love" (Doris Fisher, Allan Roberts) – 4:00
13. "Ill Wind" (Harold Arlen, Ted Koehler) – 3:04
14. "These Foolish Things (Remind Me of You)" (Harry Link, Holt Marvell, Jack Strachey) – 4:22
15. "Some Other Spring" (Arthur Herzog, Jr., Irene Kitchings) – 4:41
16. "Crazy She Calls Me" (Bob Russell, Carl Sigman) – 3:53
17. "Good Morning Heartache" (Ervin Drake, Dan Fisher, Irene Higginbotham) – 2:37
18. "Trav'lin' Light" (Johnny Mercer, Trummy Young, Jimmy Mundy) – 2:33
19. "God Bless the Child" (Herzog, Billie Holiday) – with Billie Holiday, Count Basie – 2:32

== Personnel ==
- Tony Bennett – vocals
- Lew Soloff – trumpet
- Ralph Sharon – piano
- Jorge Calandrelli – arranger and conductor of string orchestra
