= Steppin' Out with My Baby =

Song written by Irving Berlin

Song by Fred Astaire

from the album Easter Parade
- Language: English
- Written: Irving Berlin

"Steppin' Out with My Baby" is a popular song written by Irving Berlin and introduced in the 1948 musical film Easter Parade. In the film, it was sung by Fred Astaire as part of a dance number involving him on stairs and three different dance partners.

== Tony Bennett recordings ==
Since "Easter Parade", the song has been recorded and performed by several artists, most notably Tony Bennett, in whose treatment it has become a jazz standard. Introduced as the title song on his 1993 Astaire-themed album Steppin' Out, a stylish music video for it garnered some MTV airplay and was part of Bennett's commercial resurgence at the time. One such performance was included on Bennett's 1994 album MTV Unplugged. Bennett later recorded the song as bonus tracks duets with Michael Bublé and Delta Goodrem for his 2006 Duets: An American Classic album; performed it three times with Christina Aguilera on his NBC special An American Classic, Saturday Night Live, and the 59th Primetime Emmy Awards in 2007; and in 2011 with Haley Reinhart in the finale show of American Idol season 10. Aguilera and Bennett's version was nominated in 2008 50th Annual Grammy Awards in the category Best Pop Collaboration with Vocals. Bennett continued to perform the song until his retirement in 2021.

== Other recordings ==
- Fred Astaire included the song on his album The Astaire Story (1952)
- Doris Day recorded the song for her album "Cuttin' Capers" (1959).
- Curtis Stigers, alongside the John Wilson Orchestra performed the song as the opening song for the film Ted 2 (2015).
- Banu Gibson and Bucky Pizzarelli recorded the song for their album "Steppin' Out" (2002).
- American swing revivalists the Cherry Poppin' Daddies recorded a version of the song on their 2016 cover album The Boop-A-Doo, alongside several other songs originally composed by Berlin.
- Bradley Walsh recorded the song for his album Chasing Dreams (2016).

== In popular culture ==
- It was also used as the ending song for the film She's Funny That Way (with footage "Easter Parade").
- The song was performed by the cast of Are You Being Served? on the 1978 episode "Happy Returns".
