= Wintersongs =

Studio album by Laila Biali
- Released: November 1, 2024
- Recorded: 2021–2024 (over a three-year period)
- Genre: Jazz, chamber art songs, pop, classical, seasonal/holiday
- Producer: Laila Biali, Ben Wittman

Wintersongs is an album by Laila Biali. It received a Grammy Award nomination for Best Traditional Pop Vocal Album.
