= MTV Unplugged (Tony Bennett album) =

Live album by Tony Bennett
- Released: June 28, 1994
- Recorded: April 12, 1994
- Venue: Sony Studios, New York City
- Genre: Vocal jazz
- Length: 70:35
- Label: Columbia
- Producer: David Kahne

Tony Bennett chronology
Steppin' Out (1993)	MTV Unplugged (1994)	Here's to the Ladies (1995)

Professional ratings
Review scores
Source	Rating
AllMusic	link
Music Week	3/5 stars
Rolling Stone	3.5/5 stars

MTV Unplugged is a live album by Tony Bennett that was released in 1994. Backed by the Ralph Sharon Trio, Bennett appeared on the TV show MTV Unplugged to showcase the Great American Songbook with guest appearances by Elvis Costello and k.d. lang.

The album reached platinum record status in the United States and won Grammy Awards in 1995 for Best Traditional Pop Vocal Performance and Album of the Year.

On November 8, 2011, Sony Music Distribution included the CD in a box set entitled The Complete Collection.

== Track listing ==
1. "Old Devil Moon" (E.Y. Harburg, Burton Lane) – 2:28
2. "Speak Low" (Ogden Nash, Kurt Weill) – 3:10
3. "It Had to Be You" (Isham Jones, Gus Kahn) – 3:13
4. "I Love a Piano" (Irving Berlin) – 1:56
5. "It Amazes Me" (Cy Coleman, Carolyn Leigh) – 3:08
6. "The Girl I Love" (George Gershwin, Ira Gershwin) – 3:59
7. "Fly Me to the Moon (In Other Words)" (Bart Howard) – 2:57
8. "You're All the World to Me" (Lane, Alan Jay Lerner) – 2:15
9. "Rags to Riches" (Richard Adler, Jerry Ross) – 1:23
10. "When Joanna Loved Me" (Jack Segal, Robert Wells) – 3:15
11. "The Good Life"/"I Wanna Be Around" (Sacha Distel, Jack Reardon)/(Johnny Mercer, Sadie Vimmerstedt) – 3:21
12. "I Left My Heart in San Francisco" (George Cory, Douglass Cross) – 2:33
13. "Steppin' Out with My Baby" (Irving Berlin) – 3:12
14. "Moonglow" (Eddie DeLange, Will Hudson, Irving Mills) – 4:33 (with k.d. lang)
15. "They Can't Take That Away from Me" (G. Gershwin, I. Gershwin) – 3:26 (with Elvis Costello)
16. "A Foggy Day" (G. Gershwin, I. Gershwin) – 2:15
17. "All of You" (Cole Porter) – 2:35
18. "Body and Soul" (Frank Eyton, Johnny Green, Edward Heyman, Robert Sour) – 3:53
19. "It Don't Mean a Thing (If It Ain't Got That Swing)" (Duke Ellington, Mills) – 3:37
20. "Autumn Leaves"/"Indian Summer" (Joseph Kosma, Johnny Mercer, Jacques Prévert)/(Al Dubin, Victor Herbert) – 5:49

== Personnel ==
- Tony Bennett – vocals
- Ralph Sharon – piano
- Doug Richeson – double bass
- Clayton Cameron – drums

== Charts ==
Chart performance for MTV Unplugged
Chart (1994–1995)	Peak position
Australian Albums (ARIA)	11
New Zealand Albums (RMNZ)	23
US Billboard 200	48
US Top Jazz Albums (Billboard)	1
