= The Art of Excellence =

Studio album by Tony Bennett
- Released: May 3, 1986
- Recorded: 1986
- Genre: Jazz
- Length: 42:17
- Label: Columbia
- Producer: Danny Bennett

Tony Bennett chronology
The Special Magic of Tony Bennett (1979)	The Art of Excellence (1986)	Bennett/Berlin (1987)

The Art of Excellence is an album by the American musician Tony Bennett, released on May 3, 1986. It debuted on The Billboard Top Pop Albums chart in the issue dated June 21, 1986, and remained on the album chart for eight weeks, peaking at No. 160.

Sony Music Distribution included the album in the 2011 box set The Complete Collection.

== Critical reception ==
Professional ratings
Review scores
Source	Rating
AllMusic	4.5/5 stars
The Encyclopedia of Popular Music	3/5 stars
The Rolling Stone Album Guide	4/5 stars

Billboard noted, "Bennett is pensive and persuasive on a collection of lesser know songs by the likes of Irving Berin, Frank Loesser, Cy Coleman, [and] among others." People deemed the album one of the 10 best of 1986.

William Ruhlmann of AllMusic believed that "Bennett demonstrated that he had spent his time off from recording gathering a bunch of good songs and refining his singing, such as 'A Rainy Day', and 'I Got Lost in Her Arms, were better than the new discoveries, like 'How Do You Keep the Music Playing?', and 'Everybody Has the Blues'."

== Track listing ==
1. "Why Do People Fall in Love?/People" (Dennis Lambert, Brian Potter, Bob Merrill, Jule Styne) – 4:05
2. "Moments Like This" (Burton Lane, Frank Loesser) – 2:47
3. "What Are You Afraid Of?" (Jack Segal, Robert Wells) – 3:01
4. "When Love Was All We Had" (Jorge Calandrelli, Sergio Mihanovich) – 5:08
5. "So Many Stars" (Alan Bergman, Marilyn Bergman, Sérgio Mendes) – 3:44
6. "Everybody Has the Blues" (James Taylor) – 3:37
7. "How Do You Keep the Music Playing?" (Alan and Marilyn Bergman, Michel Legrand) – 4:20
8. "City of the Angels" (Fred Astaire, Tommy Wolf) – 2:24
9. "Forget the Woman" (Ettore Stratta, Ronny Whyte) – 3:16
10. "A Rainy Day" (Howard Dietz, Arthur Schwartz) – 2:59
11. "I Got Lost in Her Arms" (Irving Berlin) – 4:27
12. "The Day You Leave Me" (Cy Coleman, C. Gore) – 2:46

== Personnel ==
- Tony Bennett – Vocals
- Ralph Sharon – Piano
- Paul Langosch – Bass
- Joe LaBarbera – Drums
- Ray Charles – Piano, vocals (track 6)
