= Steppin' Out (Tony Bennett album) =

Studio album by Tony Bennett
- Released: October 5, 1993
- Recorded: March–July 1993
- Genre: Vocal jazz
- Label: Columbia
- Producer: David Kahne

Tony Bennett chronology
Perfectly Frank (1992)	Steppin' Out (1993)	MTV Unplugged (1994)

Professional ratings
Review scores
Source	Rating
AllMusic	link
Rolling Stone	4/5 stars

Steppin' Out is an album by Tony Bennett released in 1993. A tribute to Fred Astaire, the album continued Bennett's commercial comeback; like the previous year's Perfectly Frank, it achieved gold record status in the United States. In 1994, it won the Grammy Award for Best Traditional Pop Vocal Performance. A music video for "Steppin' Out with My Baby" received airplay on MTV.

On November 8, 2011, Sony Music Distribution included the CD in a box set entitled The Complete Collection.

== Track listing ==
1. "Steppin' Out with My Baby" (Irving Berlin) – 2:53
2. "Who Cares?" (George Gershwin, Ira Gershwin) – 3:17
3. "Top Hat, White Tie and Tails" (Berlin) – 2:38
4. "They Can't Take That Away from Me" (G. Gershwin, I. Gershwin) – 3:36
5. "Dancing in the Dark" (Howard Dietz, Arthur Schwartz) – 3:23
6. "A Shine on Your Shoes" (Dietz, Schwartz) – 2:22
7. "He Loves and She Loves" (G. Gershwin, I. Gershwin) – 3:30
8. "They All Laughed" (G. Gershwin, I. Gershwin) – 2:14
9. "I Concentrate on You" (Cole Porter) – 3:03
10. "You're All The World to Me" (Burton Lane, Alan Jay Lerner) – 3:08
11. "All of You" (Porter) – 3:35
12. "Nice Work If You Can Get It" (G. Gershwin, I. Gershwin) – 3:51
13. "It Only Happens When I Dance with You" (Berlin) – 2:11
14. "Shall We Dance?" (G. Gershwin, I. Gershwin) – 1:33
15. "You're Easy to Dance With"/"Change Partners"/"Cheek to Cheek" (Berlin) – 4:38
16. "I Guess I'll Have to Change My Plan" (Dietz, Schwartz) – 2:46
17. "That's Entertainment!" (Dietz, Schwartz) – 2:01
18. "By Myself" (Dietz, Schwartz) – 2:09

== Personnel ==
- Tony Bennett – vocals
- Ralph Sharon – piano
- Doug Richeson – double bass
- Clayton Cameron – drums
