= Ralph Sharon =

British-American jazz pianist (1923–2015)

- Born: September 17, 1923; London, England
- Died: March 31, 2015 (aged 91) Boulder, Colorado, United States
- Genres: Jazz
- Occupations: Pianist, composer, arranger, conductor
- Instrument: Piano
- Years active: 1940s - 2015

Ralph Simon Sharon (September 17, 1923 – March 31, 2015) was a British-American jazz pianist and arranger. He is best known for working with Tony Bennett as his pianist on numerous recordings and live performances.

== Biography ==
Ralph Sharon was born in London, England, to a British mother and Latvian-born father.

Sharon's musical career began in England, where he became pianist to Ted Heath in 1946. By late 1949, he was leading the Ralph Sharon Sextet, which included Victor Feldman as percussionist. He toured with Feldman until 1951. He emigrated to the United States in early 1954, becoming a naturalized citizen of the United States five years later.

In 1957, Ralph Sharon became pianist, arranger, and musical director for Tony Bennett, releasing The Beat of My Heart the same year. Sharon became Bennett's "man behind the music" for much of the next 45 years, recording Bennett's discography and touring with Bennett until his retirement in 2002. All nine of Bennett's Grammy Awards over this period were for studio recordings directed by Sharon.

The song "I Left My Heart in San Francisco" was given to Bennett by Sharon, who had received the sheet music from his friends, composers George C. Cory Jr. and Douglass Cross, in 1960. A year after placing the sheet music in a drawer and forgetting about it, Sharon re-discovered the manuscript by chance while packing for a tour that included San Francisco. While Bennett and Sharon liked the song, they were convinced it would only be a local hit. Instead, the tune became Bennett's signature song.

Splitting up with Bennett in 1965, he spent the next 14 years working with a series of musicians, including Robert Goulet, Rosemary Clooney, Mel Torme, Duke Ellington, and Chris Connor. He was also a jazz pianist in his own right, recording a series of his own albums. He reunited with Bennett in 1979; the two would not separate again until his retirement.

On his recording of "I'll Be Home for Christmas" from the 1992 CD Snowfall: The Tony Bennett Christmas Album, Bennett is heard at the end of the song exclaiming "Take me home, Ralph!" as Sharon plays the last notes of the song.

Retiring to Boulder, Colorado, from on-the-road work with Bennett at 78, Ralph Sharon continued to perform in the Denver metropolitan area until shortly before his death. Tony Bennett and the Ralph Sharon Trio performed at various jazz venues, including Dazzle Restaurant & Lounge in Denver. Sharon died from natural causes on March 31, 2015.

== Discography ==
=== Solo albums ===
- 1953 Autumn Leaves and Spring Fever
- 1954 Easy Jazz (As The Ralph Sharon All-Star Sextet)
- 1956 The Ralph Sharon Trio (As The Ralph Sharon Trio)
- 1956 Mr. and Mrs. Jazz (With Sue Sharon)
- 1957 Around the World In Jazz (As The Ralph Sharon Sextet)
- 1958 2:38 A.M.
- 1963 Modern Innovations On Country and Western Themes
- 1964 Do I Hear a Waltz? (As The Ralph Sharon Trio)
- 1965 The Tony Bennett Songbook (As The Ralph Sharon Trio)
- 1995 Swings the Sammy Cahn Songbook (As The Ralph Sharon Trio)
- 1996 Portrait of Harold: The Harold Arlen Songbook (As The Ralph Sharon Trio)
- 1997 Plays the Harry Warren Songbook (As The Ralph Sharon Trio)
- 1999 Plays the Frank Loesser Songbook (As The Ralph Sharon Trio)
- 2000 The Magic of Cole Porter (As The Ralph Sharon Trio)
- 2000 The Magic of Richard Rodgers (As The Ralph Sharon Trio)
- 2001 The Magic of Jerome Kern (As The Ralph Sharon Trio)
- 2001 The Magic of Irving Berlin (As The Ralph Sharon Trio)
- 2001 The Magic of George Gershwin (As The Ralph Sharon Trio)
- 2001 Plays the Ralph Blane Songbook (As The Ralph Sharon Quartet)
- 2007 Always: The Music of Irving Berlin

=== As sideman ===
With Tony Bennett

- 1957 The Beat of My Heart
- 1962 I Left My Heart in San Francisco
- 1963 I Wanna Be Around...
- 1964 When Lights Are Low
- 1986 The Art of Excellence
- 1987 Bennett/Berlin
- 1989 Astoria: Portrait of the Artist
- 1992 Perfectly Frank
- 1992 Snowfall: The Tony Bennett Christmas Album
- 1993 Steppin' Out
- 1994 MTV Unplugged: Tony Bennett (Live)
- 1995 Here's To The Ladies
- 1997 Tony Bennett on Holiday
- 1998 Tony Bennett: The Playground
- 1999 Bennett Sings Ellington: Hot & Cool
- 2001 Playing with my friends: Bennett Sings The Blues

With Johnny Hartman

- Songs from the Heart (1955)
- All of Me: The Debonair Mr. Hartman (1956)

With Mel Tormé

- Songs for Any Taste (1957)
