= Bennett Sings Ellington: Hot & Cool =

Studio album by Tony Bennett
- Released: September 28, 1999
- Recorded: February–June 1999
- Genre: Vocal jazz
- Length: 60:50
- Label: Columbia
- Producer: Tony Bennett, Danny Bennett, Phil Ramone

Tony Bennett chronology
The Playground (1998)	Bennett Sings Ellington: Hot & Cool (1999)	Playin' with My Friends: Bennett Sings the Blues (2001)

Professional ratings
Review scores
Source	Rating
AllMusic	3/5 stars

Bennett Sings Ellington: Hot & Cool is an album by Tony Bennett, released in 1999 to commemorate the centenary of Duke Ellington's birth.

At the 42nd Grammy Awards, the album won Best Traditional Pop Vocal Album. This was his sixth award in this category.

On November 8, 2011, Sony Music Distribution included the CD in a box set entitled The Complete Collection.

== Track listing ==
All songs composed by Duke Ellington, except "Chelsea Bridge"; lyricists indicated.

1. "Do Nothin' Till You Hear from Me" (Bob Russell) – 4:01
2. "Mood Indigo" (Barney Bigard, Irving Mills) – 4:33
3. "She's Got It Bad (And That Ain't Good)" (Paul Francis Webster) – 4:49
4. "Caravan" (Mills, Juan Tizol) – 4:36
5. "Chelsea Bridge" (Billy Strayhorn) – 3:59
6. "Azure" (Mills) – 3:56
7. "I'm Just a Lucky So-and-So" (David) – 3:39
8. "In a Sentimental Mood" (Manny Kurtz, Mills) – 3:31
9. "Don't Get Around Much Anymore" (Russell) – 3:16
10. "Sophisticated Lady" (Mills, Parish) – 4:43
11. "In a Mellow Tone" (Milt Gabler) – 6:54
12. "Day Dream" (John La Touche, Billy Strayhorn) – 3:56
13. "Prelude to a Kiss" (Gordon, Mills) – 4:55
14. "It Don't Mean a Thing (If It Ain't Got That Swing)" (Mills) – 4:02

== Personnel ==
- Tony Bennett – vocals, producer
- Gray Sargent – guitar
- Al Grey – trombone
- Wynton Marsalis – trumpet
- Joel Smirnoff – violin
- Ralph Sharon – piano
- Paul Langosch – double bass
- Clayton Cameron – drums
- Unidentified orchestra and big band (except for track 10)
- Ralph Burns – arranger, conductor
- Jorge Calandrelli – arranger, conductor

=== Technical personnel ===
- Vance Anderson – production coordination
- Danny Bennett – producer
- Greg Calbi – mastering
- Josh Cheuse – art direction
- Jason Groucott – assistant
- Frank Harkins – design
- Nat Hentoff – liner notes
- Herman Leonard – photography
- Joel Moss – engineer, mixing
- Rob Murphy – assistant engineer, assistant
