= Playin' with My Friends: Bennett Sings the Blues =

Studio album by Tony Bennett
- Released: November 6, 2001
- Recorded: May – June 2001
- Genre: Jazz
- Label: Sony
- Producer: Phil Ramone

Tony Bennett chronology
Bennett Sings Ellington: Hot & Cool (1999)	Playin' with My Friends: Bennett Sings the Blues (2001)	The Essential Tony Bennett (2002)

Professional ratings
Review scores
Source	Rating
Allmusic	4/5 stars
Q	4/5 stars
Stereo & Video	4/5 stars

Playin' with My Friends: Bennett Sings the Blues is a 2001 album by Tony Bennett featuring duets with notable vocalists.

On November 8, 2011, Sony Music Distribution included the CD in a box set entitled The Complete Collection.

== Track listing ==
1. "Alright, Okay, You Win" (Mayme Watts, Sidney Wyche) – 3:31 (duet with Diana Krall)
2. "Everyday (I Have the Blues)" (Peter Chatman) – 3:38 (duet with Stevie Wonder)
3. "Don't Cry Baby" (Saul Bernie, James P. Johnson, Stella Unger) – 2:43
4. "Good Morning Heartache" (Ervin Drake, Dan Fisher, Irene Higginbotham) – 4:56 (duet with Sheryl Crow)
5. "Let the Good Times Roll" (Fleecie Moore, Lovin' Sam Theard) – 3:14 (duet with B.B. King)
6. "Evenin'" (Mitchell Parish, Harry White) – 4:14 (duet with Ray Charles)
7. "I Gotta Right to Sing the Blues" (Harold Arlen, Ted Koehler) – 3:55 (duet with Bonnie Raitt)
8. "Keep the Faith, Baby" (Luchi de Jesus, Lila Lerner, Watts) – 3:51 (duet with k.d. lang)
9. "Old Count Basie Is Gone (Old Piney Brown Is Gone)" (Joe Turner) – 3:24
10. "Blue and Sentimental" (Count Basie, Mack David, Jerry Livingston) – 3:20 (duet with Kay Starr)
11. "New York State of Mind" (Billy Joel) – 4:30 (duet with Billy Joel)
12. "Undecided Blues" (Jimmy Rushing) – 3:17
13. "Blues in the Night" (Arlen, Johnny Mercer) – 3:33
14. "Stormy Weather" (Arlen, Koehler) – 4:34 (duet with Natalie Cole)
15. "Playin' with My Friends" (Robert Cray, Dennis Walker) – 4:47

== Personnel ==
=== Performers ===
- Tony Bennett – vocals
- Ray Charles
- Natalie Cole
- Sheryl Crow
- Billy Joel
- B.B. King
- Diana Krall
- k.d. lang
- Bonnie Raitt
- Kay Starr
- Stevie Wonder
- Harry Allen – saxophone
- Ralph Sharon – piano
- Mike Melvoin – Hammond organ
- Gray Sargent – guitar
- Paul Langosch – double bass
- Clayton Cameron – drums

=== Production credits ===
- Phil Ramone – producer
- Danny Bennett – executive producer
- Vance Anderson – production coordination
- Rob Mathes – vocal arrangements
- Charles Paakkari – engineer
- Joel Moss – engineer, mixing
- Claudius Mittendorfer – engineer, mixing assistant
- Tom Young – engineer, design, monitor engineer, studio monitor mix
- Dae Bennett – mixing
- Ted Jensen – mastering

== Year-end charts ==
Chart (2001)	Position
Canadian Jazz Albums (Nielsen SoundScan)	4
