= Here's to the Ladies =

Studio album by Tony Bennett
- Released: October 24, 1995
- Recorded: March–July 1995
- Genre: Vocal jazz
- Length: 67:17
- Label: Columbia
- Producer: David Kahne

Tony Bennett chronology
MTV Unplugged (1995)	Here's to the Ladies (1995)	Tony Bennett on Holiday (1997)

Here's to the Ladies is an album by Tony Bennett, released in 1995.

The theme of the album was songs made famous by female singers. The album won Bennett the Grammy Award for Best Traditional Pop Vocal Performance. It peaked at No. 1 on Billboard's Traditional Jazz Albums chart.

On November 8, 2011, Sony Music Distribution included the CD in a box set entitled The Complete Collection.

== Critical reception ==
Professional ratings
Review scores
Source	Rating
AllMusic	3/5 stars
Entertainment Weekly	A
Music Week	4/5 stars

Entertainment Weekly wrote that Bennett's "sensitivity to the distaff side of prerock music balances the craggy muscularity of his vocal style."

== Track listing ==
1. "People" (Bob Merrill, Jule Styne) 4:44 – Barbra Streisand tribute
2. "I'm in Love Again" (Peggy Lee, Cy Coleman) 3:52 – Peggy Lee tribute
3. "Somewhere Over the Rainbow" (Harold Arlen, Yip Harburg) 3:59 – Judy Garland tribute
4. "My Love Went to London" (T. Seibetta, John Wallowitch) 5:11 – Blossom Dearie tribute
5. "Poor Butterfly" (John Golden, Raymond Hubbell) 5:43 – Sarah Vaughan tribute
6. "Sentimental Journey" (Les Brown, Bud Green, Ben Homer) 3:29 – Doris Day tribute
7. "Cloudy Morning" (Marvin Fisher, Joseph Allan McCarthy) 4:44 – Carmen McRae tribute
8. "Tenderly" (Walter Gross, Jack Lawrence) 3:47 – Rosemary Clooney tribute
9. "Down in the Depths (On the Ninetieth Floor)" (Cole Porter) 2:11 – Mabel Mercer tribute
10. "Moonlight in Vermont" (John Blackburn, Karl Suessdorf) 2:53 – Margaret Whiting tribute
11. "Tangerine" (Johnny Mercer, Victor Schertzinger) 4:06 – Helen O'Connell tribute
12. "God Bless the Child" (Arthur Herzog Jr., Billie Holiday) 2:51 – Billie Holiday tribute
13. "Daybreak" (Harold Adamson, Ferde Grofé) 3:45 – Dinah Washington tribute
14. "You Showed Me the Way" (Ella Fitzgerald, Green, Teddy McRae, Chick Webb) 5:31 – Ella Fitzgerald tribute
15. "Honeysuckle Rose" (Andy Razaf, Fats Waller) 2:57 – Lena Horne tribute
16. "Maybe This Time" (Fred Ebb, John Kander) 3:26 – Liza Minnelli tribute
17. "I Got Rhythm" (George Gershwin, Ira Gershwin) 2:01 – Ethel Merman tribute
18. "My Ideal" (Newell Chase, Leo Robin, Richard Whiting) 1:55 – Margaret Whiting tribute

== Personnel ==
- Tony Bennett – vocals
- Ralph Sharon – piano
- Clayton Cameron – drums
- Doug Richeson – double bass
- Lew Soloff – trumpet solos
- unidentified session orchestra and big band (except for tracks 8, 10, 12, 16, 17 & 18)
- Jorge Calandrelli – arranger, conductor of the orchestral charts (tracks 2, 4–7, 13–15)
- Bill Holman – arranger, conductor of the Big Band charts (tracks 1, 3, 9, 11)
