= Perfectly Frank =

Studio album by Tony Bennett
- Released: September 15, 1992
- Studio: Clinton Recording (New York City); Westlake (Los Angeles, California)
- Genre: Vocal jazz
- Length: 73:45
- Label: Columbia
- Producer: Andre Fischer

Tony Bennett chronology
Forty Years: The Artistry of Tony Bennett (1991)	Perfectly Frank (1992)	Steppin' Out (1993)

Professional ratings
Review scores
Source	Rating
AllMusic	3.5/5 stars

Perfectly Frank is an album by Tony Bennett, released in 1992 and recorded as a tribute to his longtime friend Frank Sinatra.

The album debuted on the Billboard 200 chart in the issue dated October 3, 1992, and remained on the album chart for 26 weeks, peaking at number 102.

Part of Bennett's late-in-life comeback to commercial success, it achieved gold record status in the United States and won the Grammy Award for Best Traditional Pop Vocal Performance in 1993.

In 2006, the album was reissued with the same contents as Perfectly Frank: An American Classic Celebrates 80, in conjunction with Bennett's 80th birthday.

On November 8, 2011, Sony Music Distribution included the CD in a box set entitled The Complete Collection.

== Track listing ==
1. "Time After Time" (Sammy Cahn, Jule Styne) – 3:32
2. "I Fall in Love Too Easily" (Cahn, Styne) – 2:01
3. "East of the Sun (and West of the Moon)" (Brooks Bowman) – 4:11
4. "Nancy" (Phil Silvers, Jimmy Van Heusen) – 3:14
5. "I Thought About You" (Johnny Mercer, Van Heusen) – 2:55
6. "Night and Day" (Cole Porter) – 3:35
7. "I've Got the World on a String" (Harold Arlen, Ted Koehler) – 2:52
8. "I'm Glad There Is You" (Jimmy Dorsey, Paul Madeira) – 3:14
9. "A Nightingale Sang in Berkeley Square" (Eric Maschwitz, Manning Sherwin) – 2:55
10. "I Wished on the Moon" (Dorothy Parker, Ralph Rainger) – 3:08
11. "You Go to My Head" (J. Fred Coots, Haven Gillespie) – 3:46
12. "The Lady Is a Tramp" (Richard Rodgers, Lorenz Hart) – 2:25
13. "I See Your Face Before Me" (Howard Dietz, Arthur Schwartz) – 2:58
14. "Day In, Day Out" (Rube Bloom, Mercer) – 2:07
15. "Indian Summer" (Al Dubin, Victor Herbert) – 2:59
16. "Call Me Irresponsible" (Cahn, Van Heusen) – 3:24
17. "Here's That Rainy Day" (Sonny Burke, Van Heusen) – 3:31
18. "Last Night When We Were Young" (Arlen, Yip Harburg) – 2:25
19. "I Wish I Were in Love Again" (Rodgers, Hart) – 2:14
20. "A Foggy Day" (George Gershwin, Ira Gershwin) – 2:12
21. "Don't Worry 'bout Me" (Bloom, Koehler) – 4:53
22. "One for My Baby (and One More for the Road)" (Arlen, Mercer) – 3:24
23. "Angel Eyes" (Earl Brent, Matt Dennis) – 2:42
24. "I'll Be Seeing You" (Irving Kahal, Sammy Fain) – 2:56

== Personnel ==
- Tony Bennett - vocals
- Ralph Sharon - piano
- Paul Langosch - double bass
- Joe LaBarbera - drums
