= Tony Bennett =

American singer (1926–2023)

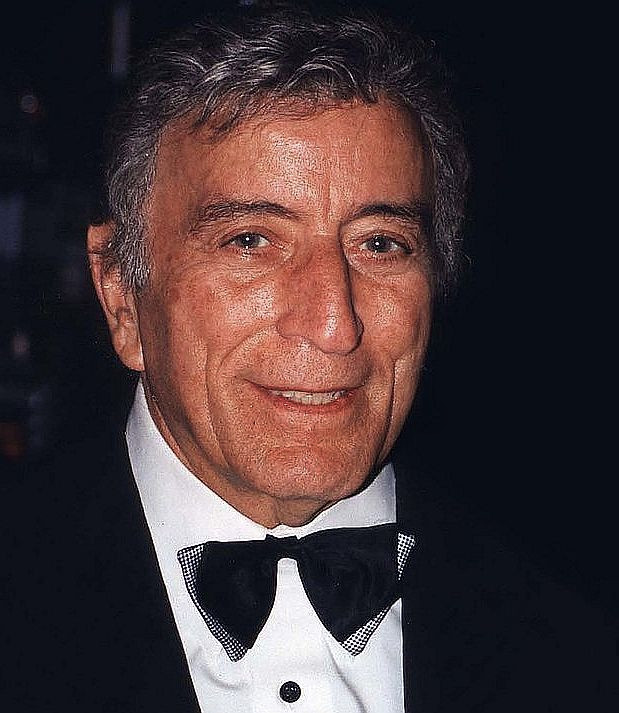
- Bennett in 2002
- Born: Anthony Dominick Benedetto; August 3, 1926; New York City, U.S.
- Died: July 21, 2023 (aged 96); New York City, U.S.
- Burial place: Calvary Cemetery, Queens, New York City
- Years active: 1949–2021
- Spouses: Patricia Beech (m. 1952; div. 1971) Sandra Grant (m. 1971; div. 1983) Susan Crow (m. 2007)
- Children: 4, including Antonia
- Musical career
- Genres: Traditional pop; swing; jazz; easy listening; big band
- Instrument: Vocals
- Labels: Columbia; MGM; Improv; Legacy; Verve
- Military service
- Branch: United States Army
- Service years: 1944–1946
- Rank: Private first class
- Unit: 63rd Infantry Division
- Conflicts: World War II; Rhineland Offensive; Central Europe
- Website: www.tonybennett.com

Anthony Dominick Benedetto (August 3, 1926 – July 21, 2023), known professionally as Tony Bennett, was an American jazz and traditional pop singer. He received many accolades, including 20 Grammy Awards, a Lifetime Achievement Award, and two Primetime Emmy Awards. Bennett was named a National Endowments for the Arts Jazz Master and a Kennedy Center Honoree. He founded the Frank Sinatra School of the Arts in Astoria, Queens, New York, along with Exploring the Arts, a non-profit arts education program. He sold more than 50 million records worldwide and earned a star on the Hollywood Walk of Fame. He was the oldest person to receive the Gershwin Awards in Washington DC.

Bennett began singing at an early age. He fought in the final stages of World War II as a U.S. Army infantryman in the European Theater. Afterward, he developed his singing technique, signed with Columbia Records, and had his first number-one popular song with "Because of You" in 1951. Several popular tracks such as "Rags to Riches" followed in early 1953. He then refined his approach to encompass jazz singing. He reached an artistic peak in the late 1950s with albums such as The Beat of My Heart and Strike Up the Band. In 1962, Bennett recorded his signature song, "I Left My Heart in San Francisco". His career and personal life experienced an extended downturn during the height of the rock era. Bennett staged a comeback in the late 1980s and 1990s, putting out gold albums again and expanding his reach to the MTV Generation while keeping his musical style intact.

Bennett continued to create popular and critically praised work well into the 21st century. He attracted renewed acclaim late in his career for his collaboration with Lady Gaga, which began with the album Cheek to Cheek (2014); the two performers toured together to promote the album throughout 2014 and 2015. With the release of the duo's second album, Love for Sale (2021), Bennett broke the individual record for the longest span of top-10 albums on the Billboard 200 chart for any living artist; his first top-10 record was I Left My Heart in San Francisco in 1962. Bennett also broke the Guinness World Record for the oldest person to release an album of new material, at the age of 95 years and 60 days.

In February 2021, Bennett revealed that he had been diagnosed with Alzheimer's disease in 2016. The slow progression of his illness allowed him to continue to record, tour, and perform until his retirement from concerts due to physical challenges, which was announced after his final performances on August 3 and 5, 2021, at Radio City Music Hall.

== Early life ==
=== 1926–1943: Family and education ===
Anthony Dominick Benedetto was born on August 3, 1926, at St. John's Hospital in Long Island City, Queens, in New York City. His parents were grocer John Benedetto and seamstress Anna (née Suraci), and he was the first member of his family to be born in a hospital. In 1906, John had emigrated from Podargoni, a rural eastern district of the southern Italian city of Reggio Calabria; he was a member of the local ethnic Greek community (Griko people). Anna had been born in the U.S. shortly after her parents also emigrated from the Calabria region in 1899. Other relatives were also part of the mass migration of Italians to America. Tony grew up with an older sister, Mary, and an older brother, John Jr. With a father who was ailing and unable to work, the children grew up in poverty. John Sr. instilled in his son a love of art and literature, and a compassion for human suffering, but died when Tony was ten years old.

Bennett grew up listening to Al Jolson, Eddie Cantor, Judy Garland, and Bing Crosby, as well as jazz artists such as Louis Armstrong, Jack Teagarden, and Joe Venuti. His uncle Dick was a tap dancer in vaudeville, giving him an early window into show business, and his uncle Frank was the Queens borough library commissioner. By age 10 he was already singing, and performed at the opening of the Triborough Bridge, standing next to Mayor Fiorello La Guardia, who patted him on the head. Drawing was another early passion of his; he became known as the class caricaturist at P.S. 141 and anticipated a career in commercial art. He began singing for money at the age of 13, performing as a singing waiter in several Italian restaurants around his native Queens.

Bennett attended New York's School of Industrial Art, where he studied painting and music, and would later appreciate their emphasis on proper technique. However, he dropped out at the age of 16 to help support his family. He worked as a copy boy and runner for the Associated Press in Manhattan and in several other low-skilled, low-paying jobs. He mostly set his sights on a professional singing career, returning to performing as a singing waiter, playing and winning amateur nights all around the city, and enjoying a successful engagement at a Paramus, New Jersey, nightclub.

=== 1944–1950: World War II and after ===
Benedetto was drafted into the United States Army in November 1944, during the final stages of World War II. He did basic training at Fort Dix and Fort Robinson as part of becoming an infantry rifleman. In January 1945, he was assigned as a replacement infantryman to the 255th Infantry Regiment of the 63rd Infantry Division, a unit filling in for the heavy losses suffered in the Battle of the Bulge. He moved across France and later into Germany. As March 1945 began, he joined the front line of what he would later describe as a "front-row seat in hell".

As the German Army was pushed back to its homeland, Benedetto and his company saw bitter fighting in cold winter conditions, often hunkering down in foxholes as German 88 mm guns fired on them. At the end of March, they crossed the Rhine and entered Germany, engaging in dangerous house-to-house, town-after-town fighting to clean out German soldiers; during the first week of April, they crossed the Kocher River, and by the end of the month reached the Danube. During his time in combat, Benedetto narrowly escaped death several times. The experience made him a pacifist; he would later write, "Anybody who thinks that war is romantic obviously hasn't gone through one", and later say, "It was a nightmare that's permanent. I just said, 'This is not life. This is not life.'" At the war's conclusion he was involved in the liberation of the Kaufering concentration camp, a subcamp of Dachau, near Landsberg, where some American prisoners of war from the 63rd Division had also been held. He later wrote in his autobiography that "I saw things no human being should ever have to see."

Benedetto stayed in Germany as part of the occupying force but was assigned to an informal Special Services band unit that would entertain nearby American forces. His dining with a black friend from high school—at a time when the Army was still racially segregated—led to his being demoted and reassigned to Graves Registration Service duties. Subsequently, he sang with the 314th Army Special Services Band under the stage name Joe Bari (a name he had started using before the war, chosen after the city and province in Italy, and as a partial anagram of his family origins in Calabria). He played with many musicians who would have post-war careers.

Upon his discharge from the Army and return to the States in 1946, Benedetto studied at the American Theatre Wing on the GI Bill. He was taught the bel canto singing discipline, which would keep his voice in good shape for his entire career. He continued to perform wherever he could, including while waiting tables. Based upon a suggestion from a teacher at the American Theatre Wing, he developed an unusual approach that involved imitating, as he sang, the style and phrasing of other musicians—such as that of Stan Getz's saxophone and Art Tatum's piano—helping him to improvise as he interpreted a song. He made a few recordings as Bari in 1949 for a small outfit called Leslie Records, but they failed to sell.

In 1949, Pearl Bailey recognized Benedetto's talent and asked him to open for her in Greenwich Village. She had invited Bob Hope to the show. Hope decided to take Benedetto on the road with him and shortened his name to Tony Bennett. In 1950, Bennett cut a demo of "Boulevard of Broken Dreams" and was signed to the major label Columbia Records by Mitch Miller.

== Career ==
=== 1951–1959: First successes ===
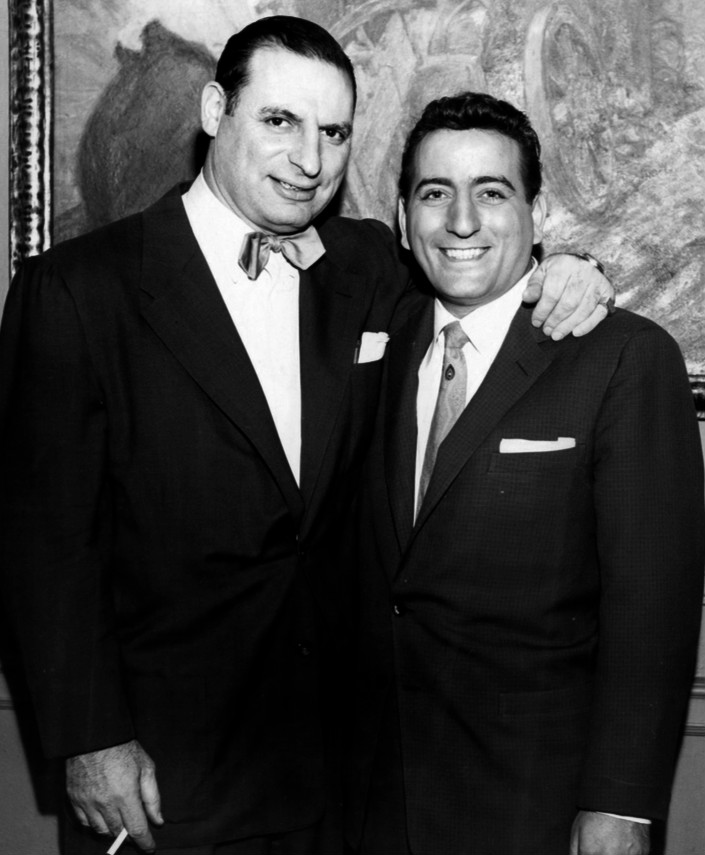
Bennett (right) with Chicago columnist and talk show host Irv Kupcinet, during the 1950s

Warned by Miller not to imitate Frank Sinatra (who was just then leaving Columbia), Bennett began his career as a crooner of commercial pop tunes. His first big hit was "Because of You", a ballad produced by Miller with a lush orchestral arrangement by Percy Faith. It began gaining popularity on jukeboxes, then reached number one on the pop charts in 1951 and stayed there for ten weeks, selling over a million copies. This was followed to the top of the charts later that year by a similarly styled rendition of Hank Williams's "Cold, Cold Heart", which helped introduce Williams and country music in general to a wider national audience. The Miller and Faith team continued to work on all of Bennett's early hits. Bennett's recording of "Blue Velvet" was also very popular and attracted screaming teenage fans at concerts at the famed Paramount Theater in New York (where Bennett did seven shows a day, starting at 10:30 am) and elsewhere.

A third number-one came in 1953 with "Rags to Riches". Unlike Bennett's other early hits, this was an up-tempo big band number with a bold, brassy sound and a double tango in the instrumental break; it topped the charts for eight weeks. Later that year, the producers of the upcoming Broadway musical Kismet asked Bennett to record "Stranger in Paradise" as a way of promoting the show during a New York newspaper strike. The song reached the top, the show was a hit, and Bennett began a long practice of recording show tunes. "Stranger in Paradise" was also a number-one hit in the United Kingdom a year and a half later.

Once the rock and roll era began in 1955, the dynamic of the music industry changed and it became harder and harder for existing pop singers to do well commercially. Nevertheless, Bennett continued to enjoy success, placing eight songs in the Billboard Top 40 during the latter part of the 1950s, with "In the Middle of an Island" (which he vehemently hated) reaching the highest at number nine in 1957.

For a month in August–September 1956, Bennett hosted an NBC Saturday night television variety show, The Tony Bennett Show, as a summer replacement for The Perry Como Show. Patti Page and Julius La Rosa had in turn hosted the two previous months, and they all shared the same singers, dancers, and orchestra. In 1959, Bennett would again fill in for The Perry Como Show, this time alongside Teresa Brewer and Jaye P. Morgan as co-hosts of the summer-long Perry Presents.

=== 1954–1965: A growing artistry ===
In 1954, the guitarist Chuck Wayne became Bennett's musical director. Bennett released his first long-playing album in 1955, Cloud 7. The album was billed as featuring Wayne and showed Bennett's leanings towards jazz. In 1957, Ralph Sharon became Bennett's pianist, arranger, and musical director, replacing Wayne. Sharon told Bennett that a career singing "sweet saccharine songs like 'Blue Velvet'" would not last long, and encouraged Bennett to focus even more on his jazz inclinations.

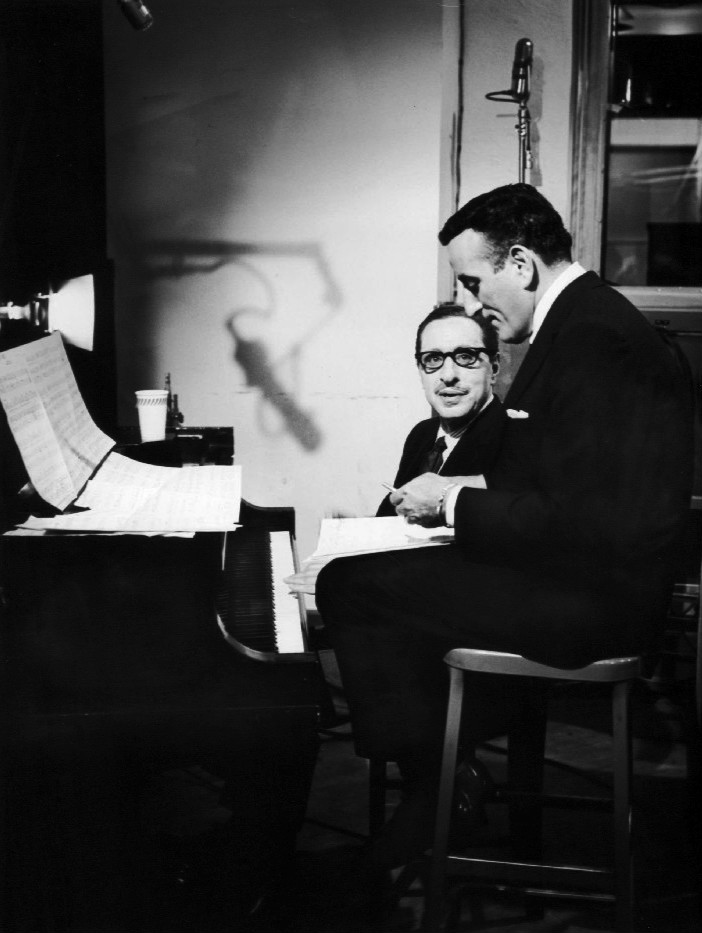
Bennett (right) with composer Harold Arlen, rehearsing for the television program The Twentieth Century in 1964

The result was the 1957 album The Beat of My Heart. It featured well-known jazz musicians such as Herbie Mann and Nat Adderley, with a strong emphasis on percussion from the likes of Art Blakey, Jo Jones, Latin star Candido Camero, and Chico Hamilton. The album was both popular and critically praised. Bennett followed this by working with the Count Basie Orchestra, becoming the first male pop vocalist to sing with Count Basie's band. The albums Strike Up the Band and In Person! (both 1959) were the well-regarded fruits of this collaboration, with "Chicago" being one of the standout songs.

Bennett also built up the quality and, therefore, the reputation of his nightclub act; in this he was following the path of Sinatra and other top jazz and standards singers of this era. In June 1962, Bennett staged a highly promoted concert performance at Carnegie Hall, using a stellar lineup of musicians including Al Cohn, Kenny Burrell, and Candido, as well as the Ralph Sharon Trio. Carnegie Hall had not featured a male pop performer until then (only Judy Garland one year before that). The concert featured 44 songs, including favorites like "I've Got the World on a String" and "The Best Is Yet To Come". It was a big success and like Garland's, the concert was recorded for posterity, further cementing Bennett's reputation as a star both at home and abroad. Bennett also appeared on television, and in October 1962 he sang on the initial broadcast of The Tonight Show Starring Johnny Carson.

"For my money, Tony Bennett is the best singer in the business. He excites me when I watch him. He moves me. He's the singer who gets across what the composer has in mind, and probably a little more."

— Frank Sinatra, in a 1965 Life magazine interview

Also in 1962, Bennett released his recording of "I Left My Heart in San Francisco", a decade-old but little-known song originally written for an opera singer. Although this single only reached number 19 on the Billboard Hot 100, it spent close to a year on various other charts and increased Bennett's exposure. The album of the same title was a top 5 hit and both the single and album achieved gold record status. The song won Grammy Awards for Record of the Year and Best Male Solo Vocal Performance for Bennett. Over the years, this would become known as Bennett's signature song. In 2001, it was ranked 23rd on an RIAA/NEA list of the most historically significant Songs of the 20th Century.

Bennett's following album, I Wanna Be Around... (1963), was also a top-5 success, with the title track and "The Good Life" each reaching the top 20 of the pop singles chart along with the top 10 of the Adult Contemporary chart.

The next year brought the Beatles and the British Invasion, and with them still more musical and cultural attention to rock and less to pop, standards, and jazz. Over the next couple of years, Bennett had minor hits with several albums and singles based on show tunes; his last top-40 single was the number 34 hit "If I Ruled the World", from the musical Pickwick, in 1965, but his commercial fortunes were clearly starting to decline. An attempt to break into acting with a role in the poorly received 1966 film The Oscar met with middling reviews for Bennett; he did not enjoy the experience and did not seek further roles.

A firm believer in the Civil Rights Movement, Bennett participated in the 1965 Selma to Montgomery marches. He performed in the "Stars for Freedom" rally the night before Martin Luther King's "How Long, Not Long" speech. At the conclusion of the march, Bennett was driven to the airport by Viola Liuzzo, a mother of five from Detroit, who was murdered later that day by the Ku Klux Klan.

Bennett refused to perform in apartheid South Africa.

=== 1965–1979: Years of struggle ===
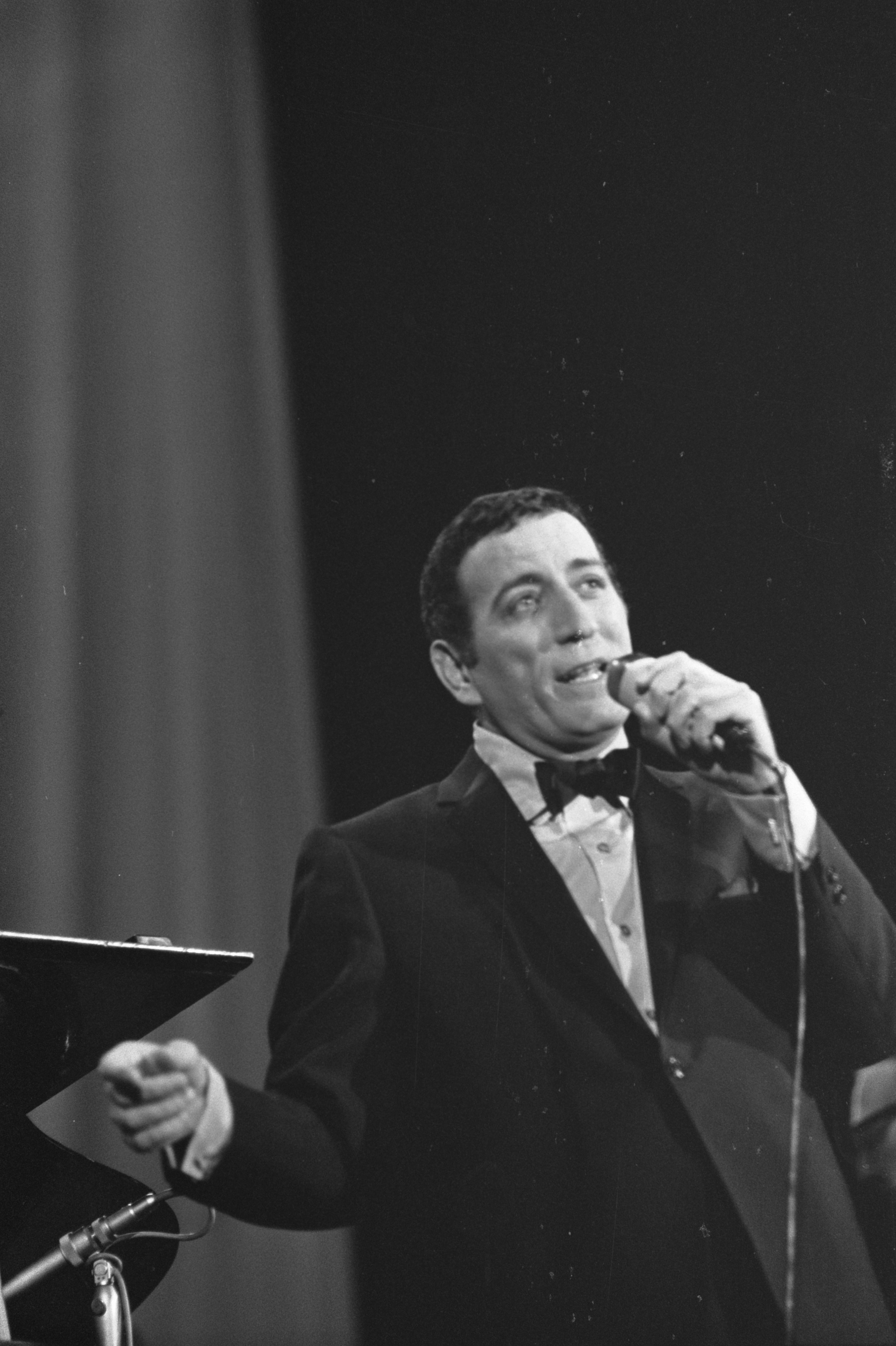
Bennett performing in 1966

Ralph Sharon and Bennett parted ways in 1965. There was great pressure on singers such as Lena Horne and Barbra Streisand to record "contemporary" rock songs and, in this vein, Columbia Records' Clive Davis suggested that Bennett do the same. Bennett was very reluctant and, when he tried, the results pleased no one. This was exemplified by Tony Sings the Great Hits of Today! (1970), before which Bennett became physically ill at the thought of recording. It featured covers of Beatles and other current songs and a psychedelic art cover.

Years later, Bennett would recall his dismay at being asked to do contemporary material, comparing it to when his mother was forced to produce a cheap dress. By 1972, he had departed Columbia for the Verve division of MGM Records (Philips in the UK) and relocated for a stint in London, where he hosted a television show from the Talk of the Town nightclub in conjunction with Thames Television, Tony Bennett at the Talk of the Town. With his new label, he tried a variety of approaches, including some more Beatles material, but found no renewed commercial success, and in a couple more years he was without a recording contract.

Taking matters into his own hands, Bennett started his own record company, Improv. He recorded some songs that would later become favorites, such as "What is This Thing Called Love?", and made two well-regarded albums with jazz pianist Bill Evans, The Tony Bennett/Bill Evans Album (1975) and Together Again (1976), but Improv lacked a distribution arrangement with a major label and by 1977, it was out of business.

As the decade neared its end, Bennett had no recording contract, no manager, and was not performing many concerts outside of Las Vegas. He had developed a drug addiction, was living beyond his means, and had the Internal Revenue Service trying to seize his Los Angeles home.

=== 1979–1989: Turnaround ===
After a near-fatal cocaine overdose in 1979, Bennett called his sons Danny and Dae for help. "Look, I'm lost here", he told them. "It seems like people don't want to hear the music I make."

Danny and Dae's band, Quacky Duck and His Barnyard Friends, had floundered and the former realized he was not musically talented but had a head for business. His father, on the other hand, had tremendous musical talent, but had trouble sustaining a career from it and had little financial sense. Danny signed on as his father's manager.

Danny got his father's expenses under control, moved him back to New York City, and began booking him in colleges and small theaters to get him away from a "Vegas" image. After some effort, a successful plan to pay back the IRS debt was put into place. The singer had also reunited with Ralph Sharon as his pianist and musical director (and would remain with him until Sharon's retirement in 2002). By 1986, Tony Bennett was re-signed to Columbia Records, this time with creative control, and released The Art of Excellence. This became his first album to reach the charts since 1972.

Henry Mancini's theme song "Life in a Looking Glass" from the Blake Edwards motion picture That's Life (1986), sung by Bennett, received a nomination at the Oscars for Best Original Song.

=== 1990–2006: Established career ===
Danny Bennett felt that younger audiences who were unfamiliar with his father would respond to his music if given a chance. No changes to Tony's formal appearance, singing style, musical accompaniment (The Ralph Sharon Trio or an orchestra), or song choice (generally the Great American Songbook) were necessary or desirable. Accordingly, Danny began regularly to book his father on Late Night with David Letterman, a show with a younger, "hip" audience. This was subsequently followed by appearances on Late Night with Conan O'Brien, Sesame Street, The Simpsons, Muppets Tonight, and various MTV programs. In 1993, Bennett played a series of benefit concerts organized by alternative rock radio stations around the country. The plan worked; as Tony later remembered, "I realized that young people had never heard those songs. Cole Porter, Gershwin—they were like, 'Who wrote that?' To them, it was different. If you're different, you stand out."

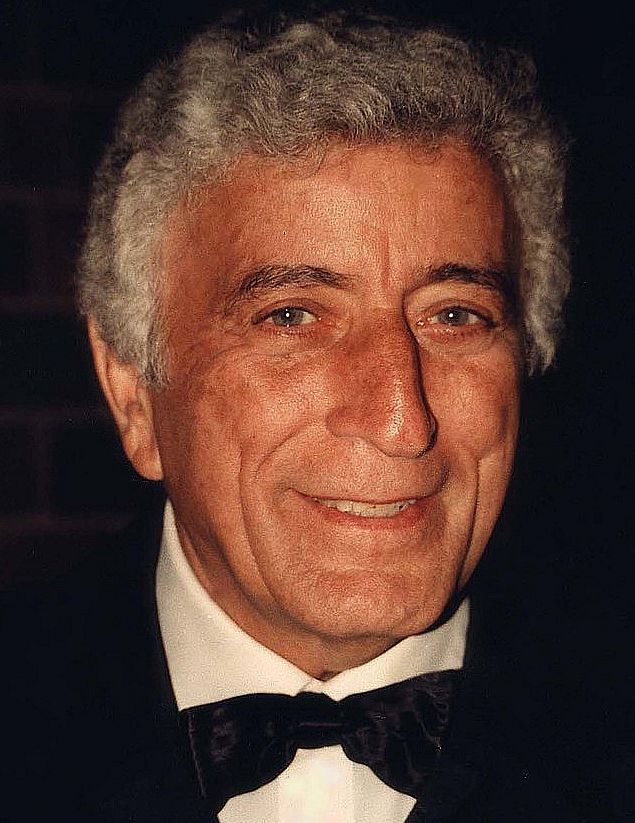
Bennett in Baltimore, 1995

During this time, Bennett continued to record, first putting out the acclaimed look-back Astoria: Portrait of the Artist (1990), then emphasizing themed albums such as the Sinatra homage Perfectly Frank (1992) and the Fred Astaire tribute Steppin' Out (1993). The latter two both achieved gold status and won Grammys for Best Traditional Pop Vocal Performance (Bennett's first Grammys since 1962) and further established Bennett as the inheritor of the mantle of a classic American great.

As Bennett was seen at MTV Video Music Awards shows side by side with the likes of the Red Hot Chili Peppers and Flavor Flav, and as his "Steppin' Out with My Baby" video received MTV airplay, it was clear that, as The New York Times said, "Tony Bennett has not just bridged the generation gap, he has demolished it. He has solidly connected with a younger crowd weaned on rock. And there have been no compromises."

The new audience reached its height with Bennett's appearance in 1994 on MTV Unplugged. (He quipped on the show, "I've been unplugged my whole career.") Featuring guest appearances by rock and country stars Elvis Costello and k.d. lang (both of whom had an affinity for the standards genre), the show attracted a considerable audience and much media attention. The resulting MTV Unplugged: Tony Bennett album went platinum and, besides taking the Best Traditional Pop Vocal Performance Grammy award for the third straight year, also won the top Grammy prize of Album of the Year.

Following his comeback, Bennett financially prospered; by 1999, his assets were worth $15 to 20 million. He had no intention of retiring, saying in reference to masters such as Pablo Picasso, Jack Benny, and Fred Astaire: "right up to the day they died, they were performing. If you are creative, you get busier as you get older." He continued to record and tour steadily, playing a hundred shows a year by the end of the 1990s. In concert, he often made a point of singing one song (usually "Fly Me to the Moon") without any microphone or amplification, demonstrating his skills at vocal projection. One show, Tony Bennett's Wonderful World: Live From San Francisco, was made into a PBS special. He conceptualized and starred in the first episode of the A&E Network's popular Live by Request series, for which he won an Emmy Award. He made cameo appearances as himself in films such as The Scout, Analyze This, and Bruce Almighty.

In 1998, Bennett performed on the final day of a mud-soaked Glastonbury Festival in an immaculate suit and tie, his whole set on this occasion consisting of songs about the weather. His autobiography The Good Life was also first published in 1998. A series of albums, often based on themes (such as Duke Ellington, Louis Armstrong, Billie Holiday, blues, or duets), met with largely positive reviews.

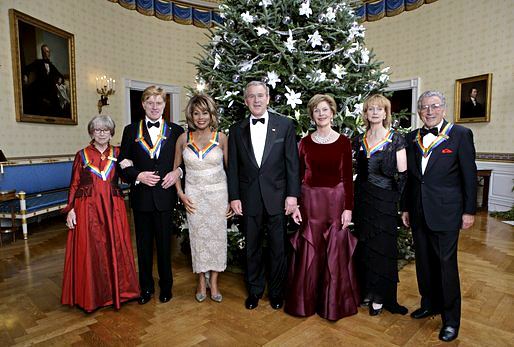
President George W. Bush and First Lady Laura Bush pose with the Kennedy Center honorees: actress Julie Harris, actor Robert Redford, singer Tina Turner, ballet dancer Suzanne Farrell and Tony Bennett. December 4, 2005, at a reception in the Blue Room at the White House.

For his contribution to the recording industry, Bennett was given a star on the Hollywood Walk of Fame at 1560 Vine Street. Bennett was inducted into the Big Band and Jazz Hall of Fame in 1997, was awarded the Grammy Lifetime Achievement Award in 2001, and received a lifetime achievement award from the American Society of Composers, Authors and Publishers (ASCAP) in 2002. In 2002, Q magazine named Bennett in its list of the "50 Bands To See Before You Die". On December 4, 2005, Bennett was the recipient of a Kennedy Center Honor. Later, a theatrical musical revue of his songs, called I Left My Heart: A Salute to the Music of Tony Bennett was created and featured some of his best-known songs such as "I Left My Heart in San Francisco", "Because of You", and "Wonderful". The following year, Bennett was inducted into the Long Island Music Hall of Fame.

Bennett frequently donated his time to charitable causes, to the extent that he was sometimes nicknamed "Tony Benefit". In April 2002, he joined Michael Jackson, Chris Tucker, and former President Bill Clinton in a fundraiser for the Democratic National Committee at New York City's Apollo Theater. He also recorded public service announcements for Civitan International.

Danny Bennett continued to be Tony's manager, while Dae Bennett is a recording engineer who worked on a number of Tony's projects and who opened Bennett Studios in Englewood, New Jersey in 2001, now shuttered due to the downturn of major label budgets combined with skyrocketing overhead. Tony's younger daughter Antonia is an aspiring jazz singer who opened shows for her father.

=== 2006–2021: Later years and final album ===
On August 3, 2006, Bennett turned 80 years old. His record label celebrated by releasing reissues, compilations, and the album Duets: An American Classic, which reached his highest chart position ever and won a Grammy Award. Concerts were given, including a high-profile one for New York radio station WLTW/106.7; a performance was done with Christina Aguilera and a comedy sketch was made with affectionate Bennett impressionist Alec Baldwin on Saturday Night Live; a Thanksgiving-time, Rob Marshall–directed television special Tony Bennett: An American Classic on NBC, which went on to win multiple Emmy Awards; receipt of the Billboard Century Award; and guest-mentoring on American Idol season 6 as well as performing during its finale. He received the United Nations High Commissioner for Refugees' Humanitarian Award. Bennett was awarded the National Endowment for the Arts Jazz Masters Award in 2006.

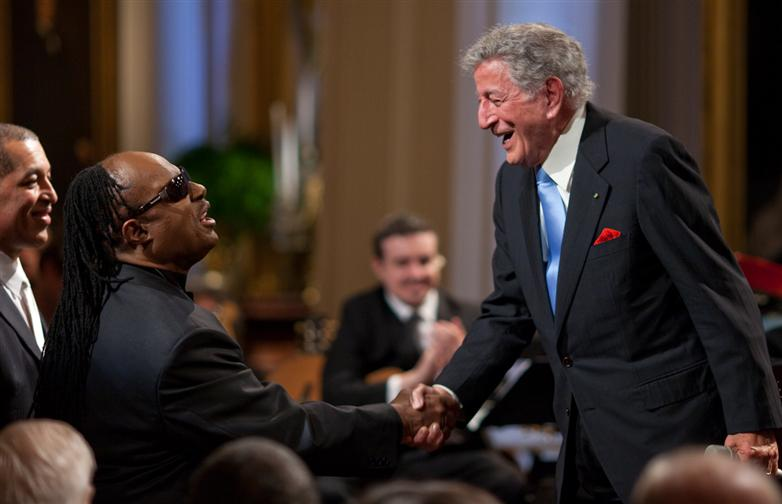
Greeting Stevie Wonder at the White House on February 25, 2009

In 2008, Bennett made two appearances with Billy Joel singing "New York State of Mind" at the final concerts given at Shea Stadium, and in October released the album A Swingin' Christmas with the Count Basie Big Band, for which he made a number of promotional appearances at holiday time. In 2009, Bennett performed at the conclusion of the final Macworld Conference & Expo for Apple Inc., singing "The Best Is Yet to Come" and "I Left My Heart In San Francisco" to a standing ovation, and later making his Jazz Fest debut in New Orleans. In February 2010, Bennett was one of over 70 artists who sang on "We Are the World 25 for Haiti", a charity single in aid of the 2010 Haiti earthquake. In October, he performed "I Left My Heart in San Francisco" at AT&T Park before the third inning of Game 1 of the 2010 World Series and sang "God Bless America" during the seventh-inning stretch. Days later he sang "America the Beautiful" at the Rally to Restore Sanity and/or Fear in Washington, D.C., which he reprised ten years later in a segment on The Late Show with Stephen Colbert.

In September 2011, Bennett appeared on The Howard Stern Show and named American military actions in the Middle East as the root cause of the September 11 attacks. Bennett also claimed that former President George W. Bush personally told him at the Kennedy Center in December 2005 that he felt he had made a mistake invading Iraq, to which a Bush spokesperson replied, "This account is flatly wrong." Following bad press resulting from his remarks, Bennett clarified his position, writing: "There is simply no excuse for terrorism and the murder of the nearly 3,000 innocent victims of the 9/11 attacks on our country. My life experiences, ranging from the Battle of the Bulge to marching with Martin Luther King, made me a life-long humanist and pacifist, and reinforced my belief that violence begets violence and that war is the lowest form of human behavior."

In September 2011, Bennett released Duets II, a follow-up to his first collaboration album, in conjunction with his 85th birthday. He sang duets with seventeen prominent singers of varying techniques, including Aretha Franklin, Willie Nelson, Queen Latifah, and Lady Gaga. Bennett appeared on the season 2 premiere of the television procedural Blue Bloods performing "It Had To Be You" with Carrie Underwood. His duet with Amy Winehouse on "Body and Soul"—reportedly the last recording she made before her death—charted on the lower reaches of the Billboard Hot 100, making Bennett the oldest living artist to appear there, as well as the artist with the greatest span of appearances. The single did well in Europe, where it reached the top 15 in several countries. The album then debuted at number one on the Billboard 200, making Bennett the oldest living artist to reach that top spot, as well as marking the first time he had reached it himself. A model of Koss headphones, the Tony Bennett Signature Edition (TBSE1), was created for this milestone (Bennett having been one of the early adopters of the Koss product back in the 1960s). In November 2011, Columbia released Tony Bennett – The Complete Collection, a 73-CD plus 3-DVD set, which although not absolutely "complete", finally brought forth many albums that had not had a previous CD release, as well as some unreleased material and rarities. In December 2011, Bennett appeared at the Royal Variety Performance in Salford in the presence of Princess Anne.

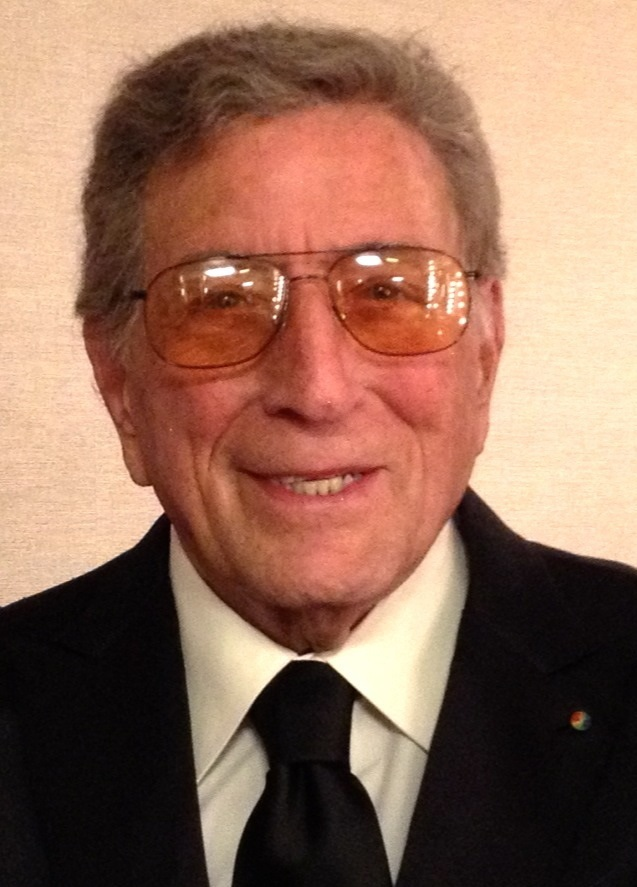
Bennett pictured in 2013

In the wake of the premature deaths of Winehouse and Whitney Houston, Bennett called for the legalization of drugs in February 2012. In October 2012, Bennett released Viva Duets, an album of Latin American music duets, featuring Vicente Fernández, Juan Luis Guerra, and Vicentico among others. The recording and filming for the project, in Fort Lauderdale, was co-sponsored by the city. On October 31, 2012, Bennett performed "I Left My Heart in San Francisco" in front of more than 100,000 fans at a City Hall ceremony commemorating the 2012 World Series victory by the San Francisco Giants. He published another memoir, Life is a Gift: The Zen of Bennett, and a documentary film produced by his son Danny was released, also titled The Zen of Bennett.

In September 2014, Bennett performed for the first time in Israel, with his jazz quartet at the Charles Bronfman Auditorium in Tel Aviv, receiving a standing ovation. He also made a surprise cameo appearance on stage with Lady Gaga at Yarkon Park, Tel Aviv, the previous evening. The performance took place days before the release that month of the two stars' much-delayed collaborative effort and resultant Grammy-winning album, Cheek to Cheek, which debuted at number one on the Billboard charts, extending the 88-year-old Bennett's record for the oldest artist to do so, It also earned him the Guinness World Records for "oldest person to reach No.1 on the US Album Chart with a newly recorded album", at the age of 88 years and 69 days. In October 2014, Bennett and Lady Gaga released the concert special Tony Bennett and Lady Gaga: Cheek to Cheek Live!, and at the end of the year, they kicked off their co-headlining Cheek to Cheek Tour. The pair also appeared in a Barnes & Noble commercial.

On September 25, 2015, he released an album of songs composed by Jerome Kern, featuring Bill Charlap on piano, called The Silver Lining: The Songs of Jerome Kern. On November 1, 2015, Bennett, joined by the choir from the Frank Sinatra School, sang "America the Beautiful" before Game 5 of the baseball World Series between the Kansas City Royals and New York Mets at Citi Field.

On August 19, 2016, shortly after his 90th birthday, Bennett was honored by the unveiling of an 8-foot tall statue in his likeness in front of the Fairmont Hotel in San Francisco. With Senator Dianne Feinstein, House Minority Leader Nancy Pelosi, and several San Francisco mayors in attendance, Bennett was serenaded by a young-adult choir singing "I Left My Heart in San Francisco". Bennett had first sung the song at the hotel in 1961. That same year, he performed at the Macy's Thanksgiving Day Parade on November 24 and the Rockefeller Center tree lighting on November 30. On December 20, 2016, NBC televised a special concert in honor of his 90th birthday, called Tony Bennett Celebrates 90: The Best Is Yet to Come. In September 2018, Bennett re-recorded the George Gershwin song "Fascinating Rhythm", after 68 years and 342 days, according to the Guinness World Records adjudicator, earning the title of "longest time between the release of an original recording and a re-recording of the same single by the same artist". The song appeared on the collaborative album Love Is Here to Stay with Diana Krall that was released on September 14.

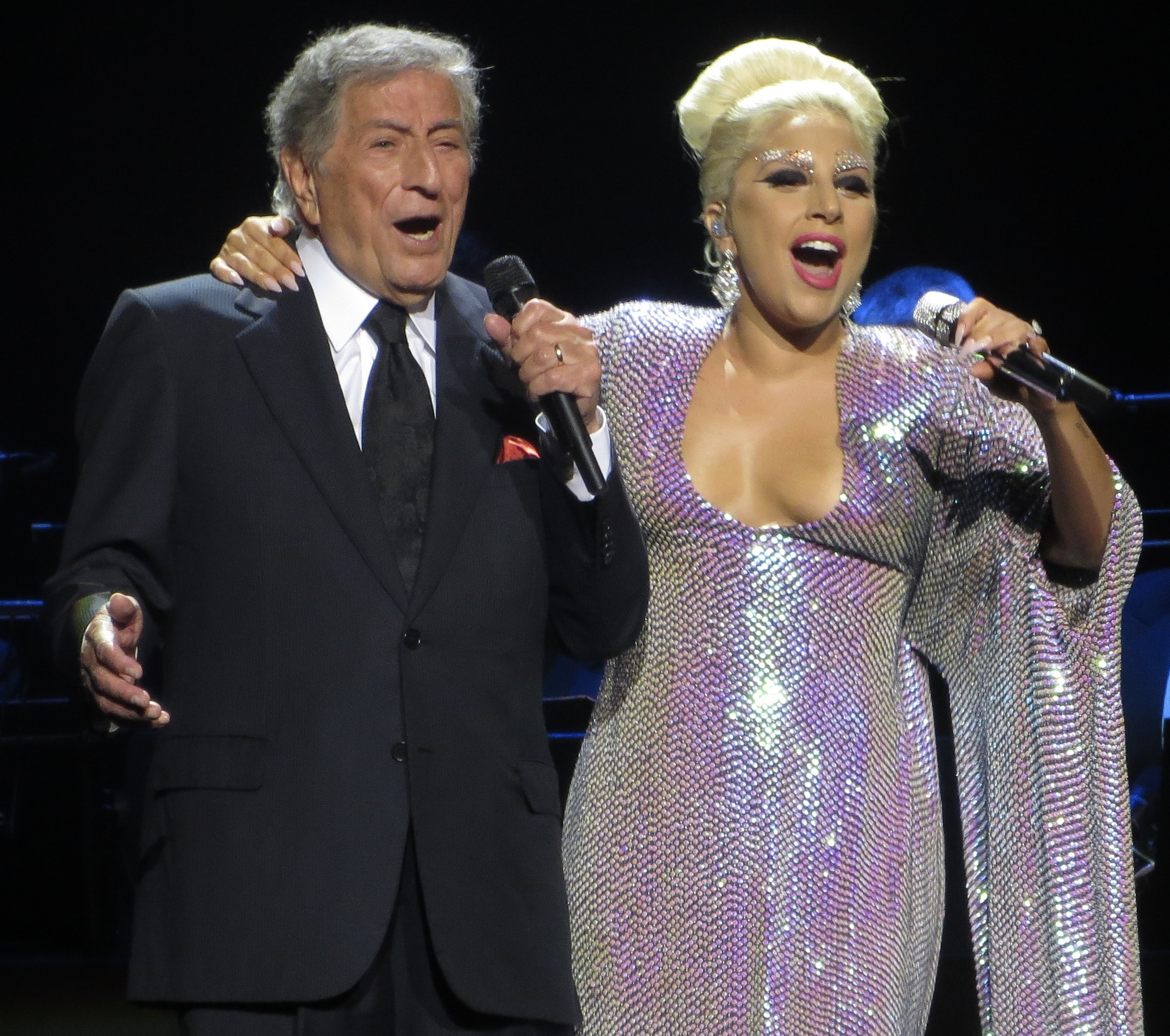
Performing with Lady Gaga on their co-headlining Cheek to Cheek Tour (2015). Their second collaborative album, Love for Sale (2021), was his final record.

Bennett's final album, Love for Sale, another collaborative record with Lady Gaga, was released on September 30, 2021. The record received generally favorable reviews, and debuted at number eight in the United States. Alexis Petridis called Bennett's performance on the album "pretty remarkable", despite the singer's age and health condition, in his review for The Guardian. Bennett broke the individual record for the longest span of top-10 albums on the Billboard 200 chart for any living artist; his first top-10 record was I Left My Heart in San Francisco in 1962. Bennett also broke the Guinness World Record for the oldest person to release an album of new material, at the age of 95 years and 60 days until being surpassed by saxophonist Marshall Allen at age 100 on February 14, 2025.

Bennett's final live performances were on August 3 and 5, 2021, when he presented a pair of shows with Lady Gaga at Radio City Music Hall. On August 12, 2021, nine days after his 95th birthday, Bennett's retirement from concerts was announced by his son and manager Danny Bennett. Danny stated that though his father remained a capable singer, he was becoming physically frail and risked a major fall if he continued touring. A television special, One Last Time: An Evening with Tony Bennett and Lady Gaga debuted on November 28, 2021, on CBS, which contained select performances from the two final concerts. Bennett's last televised performance was also with Gaga on December 16, 2021, on MTV Unplugged. The special was filmed the previous July in front of an intimate studio audience in New York City, and included duets from Love for Sale.

Despite his retirement, as of early 2022, Bennett still continued to rehearse with his music director three times a week, Danny Bennett said in an interview.

== Artistry ==
=== Painting ===
Bennett also had success as a painter, done under his real name of Anthony Benedetto, or just Benedetto. He followed up his childhood interest with professional training, work, and museum visits throughout his life. He sketched or painted every day, often of views out of hotel windows when he was on tour.

He exhibited his work in numerous galleries around the world. He was chosen as the official artist for the 2001 Kentucky Derby, and was commissioned by the United Nations to do two paintings, including one for its fiftieth anniversary. His painting Homage to Hockney (for his friend David Hockney, painted after Hockney drew him) is on permanent display at the Butler Institute of American Art in Youngstown, Ohio. His Boy on Sailboat, Sydney Bay is in the permanent collection at the National Arts Club on Gramercy Park in New York City, as is his Central Park at the Smithsonian American Art Museum in Washington, D.C. His paintings and drawings have been featured in ARTnews and other magazines, and have sold for as much as $80,000 a piece. Many of his works were published in the art book Tony Bennett: What My Heart Has Seen in 1996. In 2007, another book involving his paintings, Tony Bennett in the Studio: A Life of Art & Music, became a bestseller among art books.

=== Musical style ===
Regarding his choices in music, Bennett reiterated his artistic stance in a 2010 interview:

I'm not staying contemporary for the big record companies, I don't follow the latest fashions. I never sing a song that's badly written. In the 1920s and '30s, there was a renaissance in music that was the equivalent of the artistic Renaissance. Cole Porter, Johnny Mercer and others just created the best songs that had ever been written. These are classics, and finally they're not being treated as light entertainment. This is classical music.

== Awards and legacy ==
Bennett won 20 Grammy Awards (including the Grammy Lifetime Achievement Award), as follows (years shown are the year in which the ceremony was held and the award was given, not the year in which the recording was released):

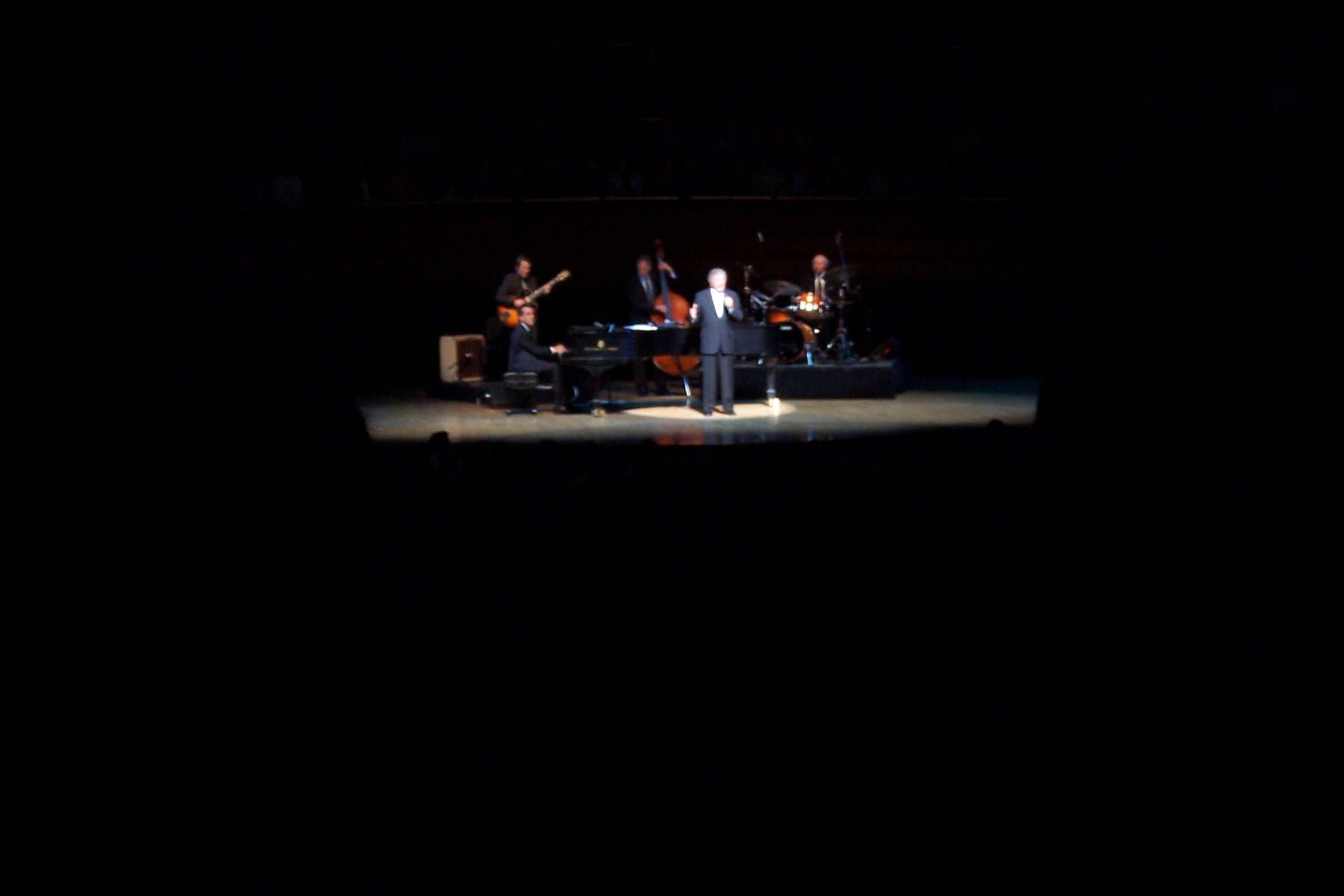
The Tony Bennett concert show as seen by the audience, with no stage set, visual effects or advanced lighting schemes. Kimmel Center, Philadelphia, September 2005.

Grammy Awards for Tony Bennett
| Year | Work | Category | Result |
|---|---|---|---|
| 1963 | I Left My Heart in San Francisco | Album of the Year (Other Than Classical) | Nominated |
| 1963 | "I Left My Heart In San Francisco" | Best Solo Vocal Performance, Male | Won |
| 1963 | "I Left My Heart In San Francisco" | Record of the Year | Won |
| 1964 | "I Wanna Be Around" | Record of the Year | Nominated |
| 1964 | "I Wanna Be Around" | Best Vocal Performance, Male | Nominated |
| 1965 | "Who Can I Turn To?" | Best Vocal Performance, Male | Nominated |
| 1966 | "The Shadow of Your Smile (Love Theme From "The Sandpiper")" | Record of the Year | Nominated |
| 1966 | "The Shadow of Your Smile (Love Theme From "The Sandpiper")" | Best Vocal Performance, Male | Nominated |
| 1991 | Astoria: Portrait of the Artist | Best Jazz Vocal Performance, Male | Nominated |
| 1993 | Perfectly Frank | Best Traditional Pop Vocal Performance | Won |
| 1994 | Steppin' Out | Best Traditional Pop Vocal Performance | Won |
| 1995 | MTV Unplugged | Album of the Year | Won |
| 1995 | MTV Unplugged | Best Traditional Pop Vocal Performance | Won |
| 1995 | "Moonglow" (with k.d. lang) | Best Pop Vocal Collaboration | Nominated |
| 1997 | Here's to the Ladies | Best Traditional Pop Vocal Performance | Won |
| 1998 | Tony Bennett on Holiday | Best Traditional Pop Vocal Performance | Won |
| 1998 | "God Bless The Child" (with Billie Holiday) | Best Pop Collaboration with Vocals | Nominated |
| 1999 | Tony Bennett: The Playground | Best Musical Album for Children | Nominated |
| 2000 | Bennett Sings Ellington: Hot & Cool | Best Traditional Pop Vocal Performance | Won |
| 2002 | —N/a | Lifetime Achievement Award | Won |
| 2002 | New York State of Mind (with Billy Joel) | Best Pop Collaboration with Vocals | Nominated |
| 2003 | Playin' with My Friends: Bennett Sings the Blues | Best Traditional Pop Vocal Album | Won |
| 2003 | "What a Wonderful World" (with k. d. lang) | Best Pop Collaboration with Vocals | Nominated |
| 2004 | A Wonderful World (with k. d. lang) | Best Traditional Pop Vocal Album | Won |
| 2004 | "La Vie en rose" (with k. d. lang) | Best Pop Collaboration with Vocals | Nominated |
| 2006 | The Art of Romance | Best Traditional Pop Vocal Album | Won |
| 2007 | Duets: An American Classic | Best Traditional Pop Vocal Album | Won |
| 2007 | "For Once in My Life" (with Stevie Wonder) | Best Pop Collaboration with Vocals | Won |
| 2008 | "Steppin' Out with My Baby" (with Christina Aguilera) | Best Pop Collaboration with Vocals | Nominated |
| 2010 | A Swingin' Christmas | Best Traditional Pop Vocal Album | Nominated |
| 2012 | Duets II | Best Traditional Pop Vocal Album | Won |
| 2012 | "Body And Soul" (with Amy Winehouse) | Best Pop Duo/Group Performance | Won |
| 2014 | Viva Duets | Best Traditional Pop Vocal Album | Nominated |
| 2015 | Cheek To Cheek (with Lady Gaga) | Best Traditional Pop Vocal Album | Won |
| 2016 | The Silver Lining: The Songs of Jerome Kern (with Bill Charlap) | Best Traditional Pop Vocal Album | Won |
| 2019 | Love Is Here To Stay (with Diana Krall) | Best Traditional Pop Vocal Album | Nominated |
| 2019 | "'S Wonderful" (with Diana Krall) | Best Pop Duo/Group Performance | Nominated |
| 2022 | Love For Sale (with Lady Gaga) | Album of the Year | Nominated |
| 2022 | Love For Sale (with Lady Gaga) | Best Traditional Pop Vocal Album | Won |
| 2022 | "I Get a Kick Out of You" (with Lady Gaga) | Record of the Year | Nominated |
| 2022 | "I Get a Kick Out of You" (with Lady Gaga) | Best Pop Duo/Group Performance | Nominated |
| 2022 | "I Get a Kick Out of You" (with Lady Gaga) | Best Music Video | Nominated |

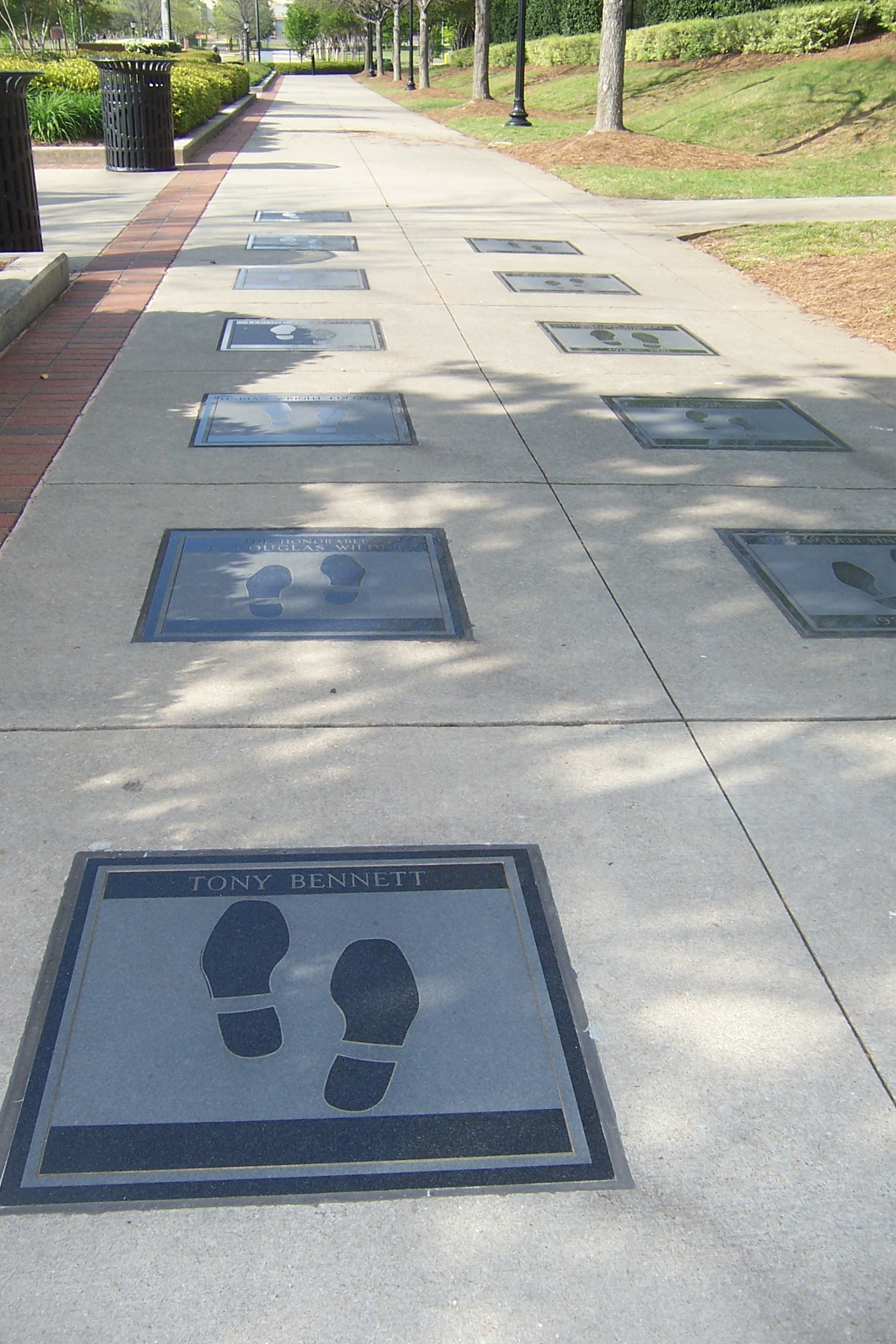
Bennett's work for the Civil Rights Movement, including his participation in the 1965 Selma to Montgomery marches, later earned him induction into the International Civil Rights Walk of Fame in Atlanta.

Bennett gained other recognition:

Honors and recognition for Tony Bennett
| Recognition | Year | Results | Ref. |
|---|---|---|---|
| New York City's Bronze Medallion | 1969 | Honored | |
| Star on the Hollywood Walk of Fame | | Honored | |
| Induction into the Big Band and Jazz Hall of Fame | 1997 | Honored | |
| Society of Singers Lifetime Achievement Award | 2000 | Honored | |
| Lifetime achievement award from the American Society of Composers, Authors and Publishers | 2002 | Honored | |
| Kennedy Center Honoree | 2005 | Honored | |
| Induction into the Long Island Music Hall of Fame | | Honored | |
| United Nations High Commissioner for Refugees Humanitarian Award | 2006 | Honored | |
| National Endowment for the Arts Jazz Masters Award | 2006 | Honored | |
| Induction into the International Civil Rights Walk of Fame | 2007 | Honored | |
| Recipient of the Golden Plate Award of the American Academy of Achievement presented by Awards Council member John Lewis | 2009 | | |
| Induction into the New Jersey Hall of Fame | 2011 | Honored | |
| Induction into the DownBeat Jazz Hall of Fame | 2015 | Honored | |
| Library of Congress Gershwin Prize | 2017 | Honored | |
| Honorary doctorates from the Berklee College of Music | 1974 | Honored, The Art Institute of Boston (1994), Roosevelt University's Chicago Musical College (1995), George Washington University (2001), Cleveland Institute of Music (2010), the Juilliard School (2010), and Fordham University (2012). | |
| A statue of Bennett was unveiled outside the Fairmont Hotel in honor of his 90th birthday, and his first performance of "I Left My Heart in San Francisco" there in 1961. | August 16, 2016 | | |
| A Guinness World Record for "oldest person to reach No.1 on the US Album Chart with a newly recorded album", at the age of 88 years 69 days, for Cheek to Cheek | 2014 | Honored | |
| A Guinness World Record for "the longest time between the release of an original recording and a re-recording of the same single by the same artist" for re-recording "Fascinating Rhythm" 68 years and 342 days after the original recording. | | Honored | |
| With the release of Love for Sale, Bennett broke a Guinness World Records title for being the oldest person to release an album of new material at the age of 95 years and 60 days. On April 3, 2022, he became the second-oldest person to win a Grammy Award, when he shared the Best Traditional Pop Vocal Album Grammy with Lady Gaga for Love for Sale, aged 95 years, 8 months, and 1 day. | | Honored | |

== Works ==
=== Discography ===
Bennett released over 70 albums during his career, almost all for Columbia Records. The biggest selling of these in the U.S. were I Left My Heart in San Francisco, MTV Unplugged: Tony Bennett, and Duets: An American Classic, all of which went platinum for shipping one million copies. Eight other albums of his went gold in the U.S., including several compilations. Bennett also charted over 30 singles during his career, with his biggest hits all occurring during the early 1950s, and none charting between 1968 and 2010.

=== Books ===
- Bennett, Tony (1996). Tony Bennett: What My Heart Has Seen. Rizzoli. ISBN 0-8478-1972-8.
- Bennett, Tony (1999). The Good Life: The Autobiography Of Tony Bennett. With Will Friedwald ([2nd] ed.). New York: Pocket Books. ISBN 0-671-02958-4 – via Internet Archive.
- Bennett, Tony; Sullivan, Robert (2007). Tony Bennett in the Studio: A Life of Art & Music. Sterling Publishing. ISBN 978-1-4027-4767-0.
- Bennett, Tony (2012). Life is a Gift: The Zen of Bennett. HarperCollins. ISBN 978-0-06-220706-7.
- Bennett, Tony; Simon, Scott (2016). Just Getting Started. HarperCollins. ISBN 978-0-06-247677-7.

== Personal life ==
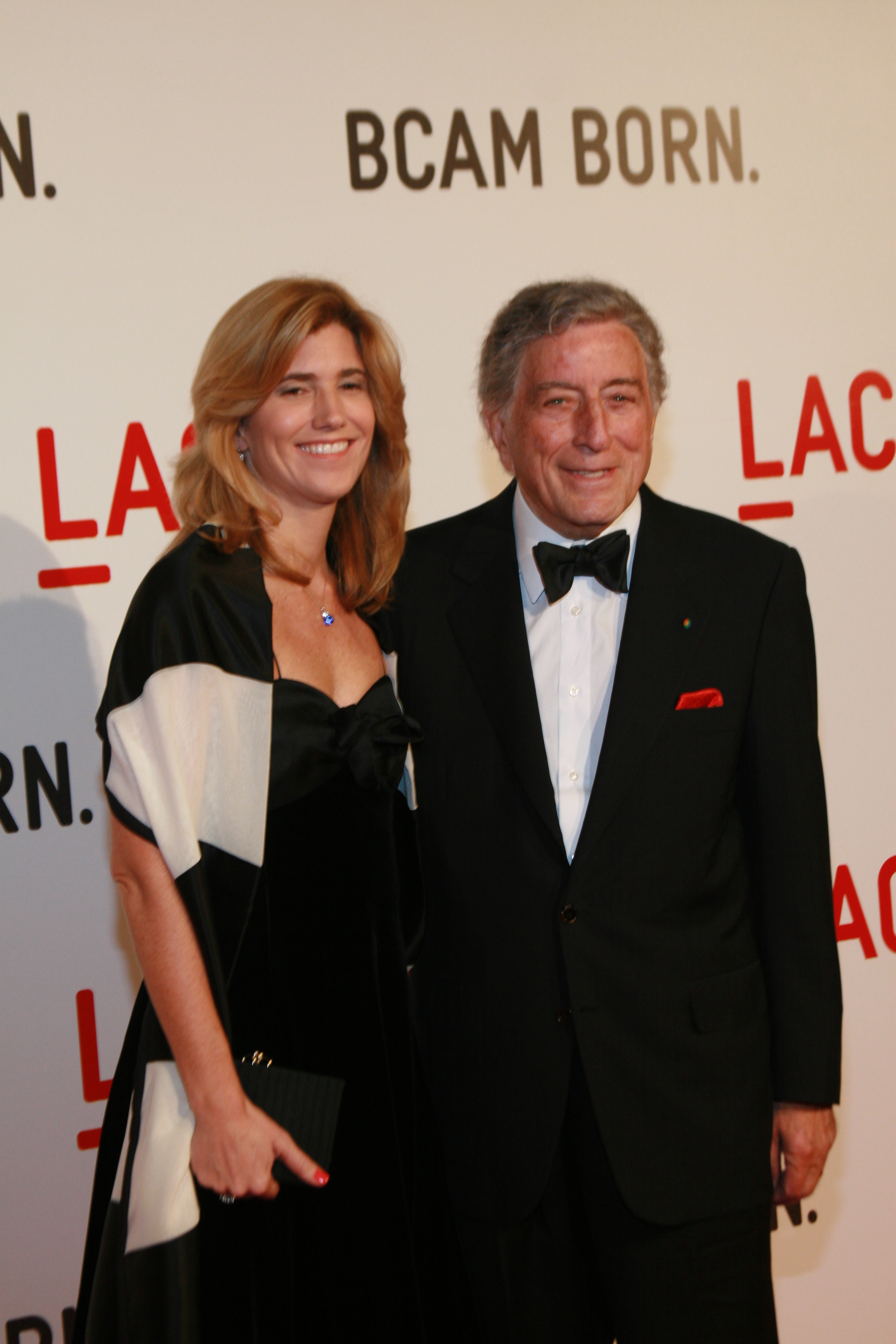
Bennett and wife Susan Crow at the opening of the Broad Contemporary Art Museum in Los Angeles in 2008

On February 12, 1952, Bennett married Ohio art student and jazz fan Patricia Beech, whom he had met the previous year after a nightclub performance in Cleveland. Two thousand female fans dressed in black gathered outside the ceremony at St. Patrick's Cathedral in Manhattan, New York, in mock mourning. The couple had two sons. Bennett and his wife Patricia separated in 1965, their marriage a victim of Bennett's spending too much time on the road, among other factors. In 1969, Patricia sued him for divorce on grounds of adultery. In 1971, their divorce became official.

Bennett had become involved with aspiring actress Sandra Grant while filming The Oscar in 1965. The couple lived together for several years and on December 29, 1971, they quietly married in New York. They had two daughters, and moved to Los Angeles. The two were married until 1983.

In the late 1980s, Bennett entered into a long-term romantic relationship with Susan Crow, a former New York City schoolteacher. Bennett and Crow founded Exploring the Arts, a charitable organization dedicated to creating, promoting, and supporting arts education. At the same time, they founded (and named after Bennett's friend) the Frank Sinatra School of the Arts in Queens, a public high school dedicated to teaching the performing arts. The school opened in 2001 and has a very high graduation rate. On June 21, 2007, Bennett married Crow in a private civil ceremony in New York that was witnessed by Mario Cuomo, the former governor of New York.

== Politics ==
The experience of growing up in the Great Depression and a distaste for the effects of the presidency of Herbert Hoover would make Bennett a lifelong Democrat.

== Illness and death ==
In February 2021, an article in AARP: The Magazine revealed that Bennett had been diagnosed with Alzheimer's disease in 2016, though he continued to perform and record until the COVID-19 pandemic in early 2020. He briefly resumed performing in 2021 for his farewell performances. Bennett's twice-weekly singing practices are thought to have kept his brain stimulated and spared him from symptoms such as disorientation, depression, and a detachment from reality. His neurologist told AARP that, prior to the pandemic, the singer's touring schedule "kept him on his toes and also stimulated his brain in a significant way". Bennett recorded tracks with Lady Gaga from 2018 until early 2020 for their 2021 album Love for Sale, despite at times being "lost and bewildered" during recording sessions.

In announcing Bennett's retirement in August 2021, Danny Bennett stated that the Alzheimer's was mainly affecting his father's short-term memory and that he would often forget he had just performed after a concert; his long-term memory remained intact and he could still remember all the lyrics to his repertoire when performing.

Bennett died at his home in New York City on July 21, 2023, following a seven-year battle with Alzheimer's disease. His family said he kept singing to the end, lastly "Because of You". He was hailed as the "champion" and "legendary interpreter" of the Great American Songbook.

Bennett was interred alongside his parents at Calvary Cemetery, Queens.

== Bibliography ==
- Bennett, Tony (1999). The Good Life: The Autobiography Of Tony Bennett. With Will Friedwald ([2nd] ed.). New York: Pocket Books. ISBN 0-671-02958-4 – via Internet Archive.
- Brooks, Tim; Marsh, Earle F. (2007). The Complete Directory to Prime Time Network and Cable TV Shows 1946–Present (9th ed.). Ballantine Books. ISBN 978-0-345-49773-4.
- Evanier, David (2011). All the Things You Are: The Life of Tony Bennett. Hoboken, New Jersey: John Wiley & Sons. ISBN 978-0-470-52065-9.
- Friedwald, Will (1996). Jazz Singing. Da Capo Press. ISBN 0-306-80712-2.
- Whitburn, Joel (1983). The Billboard Book of Top 40 Hits: 1955 to present. Billboard Publications. ISBN 0-8230-7511-7.
