= Tony Bennett discography =

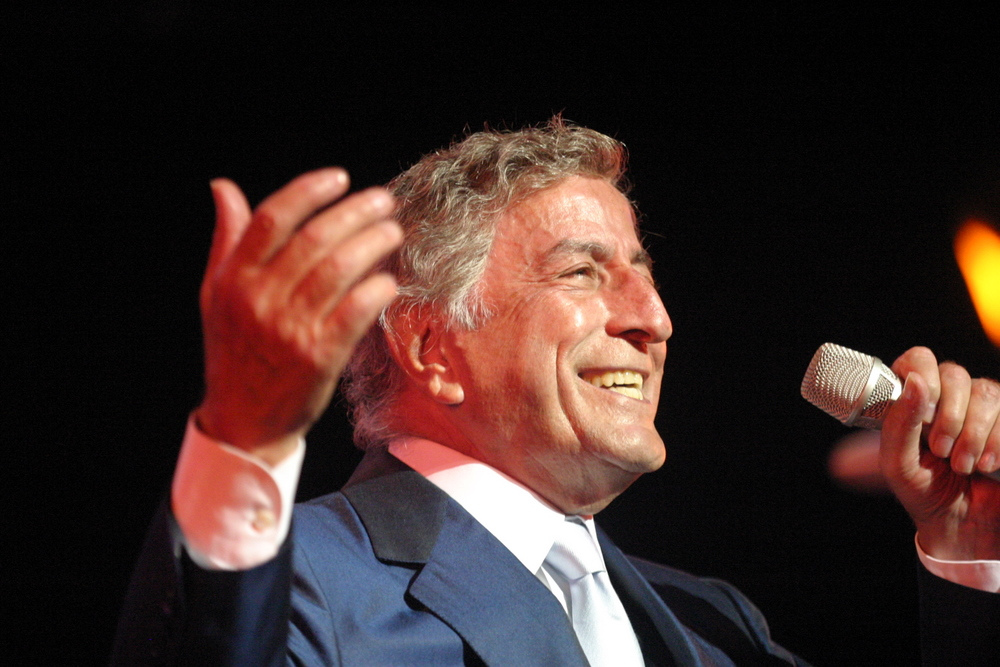
- Bennett performing in 2003
- Studio albums: 61
- Extended plays: 1
- Live albums: 11
- Compilation albums: 33
- Singles: 82
- Video albums: 3
- Music videos: 22

The discography of American traditional pop and jazz singer Tony Bennett consists of 61 studio albums, 11 live albums, 33 compilation albums, one extended play, 82 singles, three video albums and 22 music videos.

Almost all of Bennett's albums have been released by Columbia Records. The biggest selling of his albums in the US have been I Left My Heart in San Francisco, MTV Unplugged: Tony Bennett, Duets: An American Classic and Duets II, all of which were certified platinum by the RIAA for shipping one million copies. Nine other albums of his have gone gold in the US, including several compilations. Bennett has also charted over 30 singles during his career, with his biggest hits all occurring during the early 1950s. Bennett's single "Body and Soul" hit number 87 on the US Billboard Hot 100 in 2011, his first single to hit the chart in over three decades.

== Albums ==
=== Studio albums ===
List of albums, with selected chart positions and certifications
Title	Album details	Peak chart positions					Certifications
Title	Album details	US	US Jazz	AUS	NLD	UK	Certifications
Because of You	Released: 1952; Label: Columbia; Formats: LP	—	—	—	—	—	
Cloud 7	Released: 1955; Label: Columbia; Formats: LP	—	—	—	—	—	
Alone at Last with Tony Bennett	Released: 1955; Label: Columbia; Formats: LP	—	—	—	—	—	
Tony	Released: January 14, 1957; Label: Columbia; Formats: LP	14	—	—	—	—	
The Beat of My Heart	Released: 1957; Label: Columbia; Formats: LP	—	—	—	—	—	
Long Ago and Far Away	Released: 1958; Label: Columbia; Formats: LP	—	—	—	—	—	
In Person! (with Count Basie and his orchestra)	Released: 1959; Label: Columbia; Formats: LP	—	—	—	—	—	
Strike Up the Band (with Count Basie and his orchestra)	Released: 1959; Label: Roulette; Formats: LP	—	—	—	—	—	
Hometown, My Town	Released: 1959; Label: Columbia; Formats: LP	—	—	—	—	—	
To My Wonderful One	Released: 1960; Label: Columbia; Formats: LP	—	—	—	—	—	
Tony Sings for Two	Released: February 6, 1961; Label: Columbia; Formats: LP	—	—	—	—	—	
Alone Together	Released: July 11, 1961; Label: Columbia; Formats: LP	—	—	—	—	—	
Sings a String of Harold Arlen	Released: 1961; Label: Columbia; Formats: LP	—	—	—	—	—	
My Heart Sings	Released: 1961; Label: Columbia; Formats: LP	—	—	—	—	—	
I Left My Heart in San Francisco	Released: June 18, 1962; Label: Columbia; Formats: LP	5	—	—	—	13	RIAA: Platinum
I Wanna Be Around...	Released: February 18, 1963; Label: Columbia; Formats: LP	5	—	—	—	—	
This Is All I Ask	Released: 1963; Label: Columbia; Formats: LP	24	—	—	—	—	
The Many Moods of Tony	Released: 1964; Label: Columbia; Formats: LP	20	—	—	—	—	
When Lights Are Low	Released: April 20, 1964; Label: Columbia; Formats: LP	79	—	—	—	—	
Who Can I Turn To	Released: November 16, 1964; Label: Columbia; Formats: LP	42	—	—	—	—	
If I Ruled the World: Songs for the Jet Set	Released: April 19, 1965; Label: Columbia; Formats: LP	47	—	—	—	—	
The Movie Song Album	Released: January 31, 1966; Label: Columbia; Formats: LP	18	—	—	—	—	
A Time for Love	Released: August 29, 1966; Label: Columbia; Formats: LP	68	—	—	—	—	
Tony Makes It Happen	Released: 1967; Label: Columbia; Formats: LP	178	—	—	—	31	
For Once in My Life	Released: 1967; Label: Columbia; Formats: LP	164	—	—	—	29	
Yesterday I Heard the Rain	Released: 1968; Label: Columbia; Formats: LP	—	—	—	—	—	
I've Gotta Be Me	Released: 1969; Label: Columbia; Formats: LP	137	—	—	—	—	
Tony Sings the Great Hits of Today!	Released: January 7, 1970; Label: Columbia; Formats: LP	144	—	—	—	—	
Tony Bennett's "Something"	Released: October 1970; Label: Columbia; Formats: LP	193	—	—	—	—	
Love Story	Released: 1971; Label: Columbia; Formats: LP	67	—	—	69	—	
Summer of '42	Released: 1971; Label: Columbia; Formats: LP	182	—	—	—	—	
With Love	Released: 1972; Label: Columbia; Formats: LP	167	—	—	—	—	
The Good Things in Life	Released: 1972; Label: MGM, Verve; Formats: LP	196	—	—	—	—	
Listen Easy	Released: 1973; Label: MGM, Verve; Formats: LP	—	—	—	—	—	
Life Is Beautiful	Released: 1975; Label: Improv; Formats: LP	—	—	—	—	—	
The Tony Bennett/Bill Evans Album (with Bill Evans)	Released: 1975; Label: Fantasy; Formats: LP	—	31	—	—	—	
Tony Bennett Sings 10 Rodgers and Hart Songs	Released: 1976; Label: Improv; Formats: LP	—	—	—	—	—	
Tony Bennett Sings More Great Rodgers and Hart	Released: 1977; Label: Improv; Formats: LP	—	—	—	—	—	
Together Again (with Bill Evans)	Released: 1977; Label: Improv; Formats: LP	—	—	—	—	—	
The Special Magic Of Tony Bennett	Released: 1979; Label: Improv; Formats: LP	—	—	—	—	—	
The Art of Excellence	Released: 1986; Label: Columbia; Formats: CD, CS, LP	160	—	98	—	—	
Bennett/Berlin	Released: November 10, 1987; Label: Columbia; Formats: CD, CS, LP	—	—	—	—	—	
Astoria: Portrait of the Artist	Released: February 27, 1990; Label: Columbia; Formats: CD, CS, LP	—	—	—	—	—	
Perfectly Frank	Released: September 15, 1992; Label: Columbia; Formats: CD, CS, LP	102	1	—	—	—	RIAA: Gold
Steppin' Out	Released: October 5, 1993; Label: Columbia; Formats: CD, CS, LP	128	2	—	—	—	RIAA: Gold
Here's to the Ladies	Released: October 24, 1995; Label: Columbia; Formats: CD, CS, LP	96	1	—	89	—	
Tony Bennett on Holiday	Released: February 4, 1997; Label: Columbia; Formats: CD, CS, LP	101	1	96	—	192	
Tony Bennett: The Playground	Released: September 29, 1998; Label: Columbia, RPM, Sony; Formats: CD, CS, LP	—	—	—	—	—	
Bennett Sings Ellington: Hot & Cool	Released: September 28, 1999; Label: Columbia, RPM; Formats: CD, CS, LP	161	1	—	—	144	
The Art of Romance	Released: November 19, 2004; Label: Columbia, RPM; Formats: CD, digital download	65	—	—	—	101	
The Silver Lining: The Songs of Jerome Kern (with Bill Charlap)	Released: September 25, 2015; Label: Columbia, Sony Music Entertainment; Formats: CD, digital download	96	1	—	—	—	

=== Christmas albums ===
List of albums, with selected chart positions and certifications
Title	Album details	Peak chart positions		Certifications
Title	Album details	US	US Jazz	Certifications
Snowfall: The Tony Bennett Christmas Album	Released: November 6, 1968; Label: Columbia; Formats: LP	10*	—	RIAA: Platinum
Christmas with Tony Bennett and the London Symphony Orchestra (with the London Symphony Orchestra)	Released: 2002; Label: Hallmark; Formats: CD, digital download	—	—	
A Swingin' Christmas (with the Count Basie Big Band)	Released: October 14, 2008; Label: Columbia, RPM; Formats: CD, LP, digital download	28	1	

=== Collaborative albums ===
List of albums, with selected chart positions and certifications
Title	Album details	Peak chart positions										Certifications
Title	Album details	US	US Jazz	AUS	BEL	CAN	NLD	NZ	POR	SWE	UK	Certifications
Playin' with My Friends: Bennett Sings the Blues	Released: November 6, 2001; Label: Columbia, RPM; Formats: CD, LP, digital download	50	2	87	—	—	—	—	—	—	96	MC: Gold
A Wonderful World (with k.d. lang)	Released: November 5, 2002; Label: Columbia, RPM; Formats: CD, LP, digital download	41	2	23	—	—	—	48	21	—	33	RIAA: Gold; ARIA: Platinum; MC: Gold
Duets: An American Classic	Released: September 26, 2006; Label: Columbia, RPM; Formats: CD, LP, digital download	3	1	17	1	39	60	4	14	—	15	RIAA: 2× Platinum; ARIA: Gold; BPI: Gold; MC: 2× Platinum
Duets II	Released: September 20, 2011; Label: Columbia, RPM; Formats: CD, LP, digital download	1	1	2	13	2	6	2	5	7	5	RIAA: Platinum; ARIA: 2× Platinum; BPI: Gold; MC: Platinum
Viva Duets	Released: October 23, 2012; Label: Columbia, RPM; Formats: CD, LP, digital download	5	1	38	105	12	—	—	—	—	173	
Cheek to Cheek (with Lady Gaga)	Released: September 23, 2014; Label: Streamline, Interscope, Columbia; Formats: CD, LP, digital download	1	1	7	4	3	13	3	7	—	10	RIAA: Gold; ARIA: Gold; MC: Platinum; BPI: Silver
Love Is Here to Stay (with Diana Krall)	Released: September 14, 2018; Label: Verve; Formats: CD, LP, digital download	11	1	30	22	19	71	—	—	—	33	
Love for Sale (with Lady Gaga)	Released: September 30, 2021; Label: Streamline, Interscope, Columbia; Formats: CD, LP, digital download	8	1	11	11	33	10	—	—	—	6	
"—" denotes releases that did not chart or were not released in that territory.

=== Live albums ===
List of albums, with selected chart positions and certifications
Title	Album details	Peak chart positions							Certifications
Title	Album details	US	US Jazz	AUS	AUT	GER	NZ	SWI	Certifications
Live at the Latin Casino in Philadelphia with Count Basie (with Count Basie)	Released: 1958; Label: Columbia; Formats: LP	—	—	—	—	—	—	—	
Tony Bennett at Carnegie Hall	Released: 1962; Label: Columbia; Formats: LP	37	—	—	—	—	—	—	
Get Happy with the London Philharmonic Orchestra (with the London Philharmonic Orchestra)	Released: 1971; Label: Columbia; Formats: LP	195	—	—	—	—	—	—	
Tony Bennett with the McPartlands and Friends Make Magnificent Music	Released: 1977; Label: Columbia; Formats: LP	—	—	—	—	—	—	—	
MTV Unplugged: Tony Bennett	Released: June 28, 1994; Label: Columbia; Formats: CD, CS, LP	48	1	11	—	—	23	—	RIAA: Platinum
Christmas in Vienna VII (with Charlotte Church, Plácido Domingo and Vanessa Williams)	Released: October 16, 2001; Label: Sony; Formats: CD, digital download	—	—	—	48	79	—	78	
That San Francisco Sun	Released: March 28, 2006; Label: Musicom; Formats: Digital download	—	—	—	—	—	—	—	
Tony Bennett: Live	Released: 2011; Label: Columbia; Formats: CD	—	—	—	—	—	—	—	
The White House Sessions - Live 1962 (with Dave Brubeck)	Released: 2013; Label: Columbia; Formats: CD	—	—	—	—	—	—	—	
Live At The Sahara: Las Vegas, 1964	Released: 2013; Label: Columbia; Formats: CD	—	2	—	—	—	—	—	
Tony Bennett and Lady Gaga: Cheek to Cheek Live! (with Lady Gaga)	Released: 2014; Label: Columbia; Formats: DVD	—	—	—	—	—	—	—	
Tony Bennett Celebrates 90 (with various artists)	Released: 2016; Label: Columbia; Formats: CD	35	—	—	—	—	—	—	
Tony Bennett and Lady Gaga: Cheek to Cheek Live!	Released: 2022; Label: Streamline/Interscope; Formats: LP	-	-	-	-	-	-	-	
"—" denotes releases that did not chart or were not released in that territory.

=== Compilation albums ===
List of albums, with selected chart positions and certifications
Title	Album details	Peak chart positions						Certifications
Title	Album details	US	US Jazz	AUS	NZ	SWE	UK	Certifications
Blue Velvet	Released: 1958; Label: Columbia; Formats: LP	—	—	—	—	—	—	
Tony's Greatest Hits	Released: 1958; Label: Columbia; Formats: LP	—	—	—	—	—	—	
More Tony's Greatest Hits	Released: 1960; Label: Columbia; Formats: LP	—	—	—	—	—	—	
A String of Tony's Hits	Released: 1966; Label: Columbia; Formats: LP	—	—	—	—	—	9	
Mr. Broadway: Tony's Greatest Broadway Hits	Released: 1962; Label: Columbia; Formats: LP	—	—	—	—	—	—	
Tony Bennett's Greatest Hits, Vol. III^{[A]}	Released: 1965; Label: Columbia; Formats: LP	20	—	—	—	—	14	RIAA: Gold
Tony Bennett's Greatest Hits, Vol. IV	Released: 1969; Label: Columbia; Formats: LP	174	—	—	—	—	—	
Love Story: 20 All-Time Great Recordings	Released: 1969; Label: Columbia; Formats: LP	—	—	—	—	—	—	
Tony Bennett Sings His All-Time Hall of Fame Hits	Released: 1970; Label: Columbia; Formats: LP	—	—	—	—	—	—	RIAA: Gold
Tony Bennett's All-Time Greatest Hits	Released: 1972; Label: Columbia; Formats: LP	175	—	—	—	—	—	RIAA: Gold
Sunrise, Sunset	Released: 1973; Label: Columbia; Formats: LP	—	—	—	—	—	—	
The Very Best of Tony Bennett: 20 Greatest Hits	Released: 1977; Label: Warwick; Formats: CD, CS, LP	—	—	—	—	—	23	
Vocalists: Singin' Till the Girls Come Home	Released: 1983; Label: Columbia; Formats: LP	—	—	—	—	—	—	
16 Most Requested Songs	Released: July 11, 1986; Label: Columbia; Formats: CD	—	—	—	—	—	—	RIAA: Gold
Jazz	Released: 1987; Label: Columbia; Formats: CD, CS, LP	—	—	—	—	—	—	
Forty Years: The Artistry of Tony Bennett	Released: 1991; Label: Columbia; Formats: CD, CS	—	—	—	—	—	—	
My Best to You	Released: 1995; Label: Sony Music Special Products; Formats: CD	—	—	—	—	—	—	
The Essential Tony Bennett (A Retrospective)	Released: November 30, 1998; Label: Columbia; Formats: CD	—	—	75	—	—	49	BPI: Silver
The Ultimate Tony Bennett	Released: 2000; Label: Columbia; Formats: CD, digital download	—	2	—	—	—	—	
The Essential Tony Bennett	Released: July 23, 2002; Label: RPM, Columbia, Legacy; Formats: CD, digital download	125	—	87	24	33	—	ARIA: Gold
Fifty Years: The Artistry of Tony Bennett	Released: 2004; Label: Columbia; Formats: CD, digital download	—	—	—	—	—	—	
Tony Bennett: Take My Hand	Released: 2005; Label: Living Era; Formats: CD, digital download	—	—	—	—	—	—	
Tony Bennett Sings for Lovers	Released: January 10, 2006; Label: Concord; Formats: CD, digital download	—	14	—	—	—	—	
Tony Bennett's Greatest Hits of the '60s	Released: August 29, 2006; Label: Columbia; Formats: CD, digital download	—	13	—	—	—	—	
Tony Bennett: Through the Years	Released: 2006; Label: Starbucks; Formats: CD, digital download	—	—	—	—	—	—	
The Classic Collection	Released: 2007; Label: Columbia; Formats: CD, digital download	—	—	—	—	—	—	
Tony Bennett Sings the Ultimate American Songbook, Vol. 1	Released: 2007; Label: Columbia; Formats: CD, digital download	16	2	—	—	—	35	
Tony Bennett	Released: December 11, 2007; Label: Madacy; Formats: CD	—	7	—	—	—	—	
The Complete Tony Bennett/Bill Evans Recordings (with Bill Evans)	Released: April 14, 2009; Label: Fantasy Records; Formats: CD, digital download	—	7	—	—	—	—	
The Classic Christmas Album	Released: October 11, 2011; Label: Columbia; Formats: CD, digital download	91	4	35	—	—	—	
Duets & Duets II	Released: 2012; Label: Columbia; Formats: CD, digital download	—	—	18	—	59	—	
Isn't It Romantic?	Released: February 7, 2012; Label: Concord; Formats: CD, digital download	—	13	—	—	—	—	
As Time Goes By: Great American Songbook Classics	Released: February 5, 2013; Label: Concord; Formats: CD, digital download	—	2	—	—	—	—	
Sixty Years: The Artistry of Tony Bennett	Released: October 4, 2013; Label: Columbia; Formats: CD, digital download	—	—	—	—	—	—	
"—" denotes releases that did not chart or were not released in that territory.

== Extended plays ==
List of extended plays, with selected chart positions
Title	Details	Peak chart positions
Title	Details	US Jazz
iTunes Festival: London 2010	Released: June 29, 2010; Label: Sony; Formats: Digital download	14

== Singles ==
The US chart positions before "Young and Warm and Wonderful" are pre-Billboard Hot 100.

List of singles, with selected chart positions and certifications, showing year released and album name
Title	Year	Peak chart positions										Certifications	Album
Title	Year	US	US AC	AUS	AUT	BEL (FL)	BEL (WA)	CAN	FRA	NLD	UK	Certifications	Album
"Because of You"	1951	1	—	1	—	—	—	—	—	—	—	RIAA: Gold	Because of You
"I Won't Cry Anymore"	1951	12	—	—	—	—	—	—	—	—	—		Because of You
"Cold, Cold Heart"	1951	1	—	1	—	—	—	—	—	—	—	RIAA: Gold	Because of You
"Blue Velvet"	1951	16	—	—	—	—	—	—	—	—	—		Non-album singles
"Solitaire"	1951	17	—	7	—	—	—	—	—	—	—		Non-album singles
"Here in My Heart"	1952	15	—	—	—	—	—	—	—	—	—		Alone at Last with Tony Bennett
"Have a Good Time"	1952	16	—	16	—	—	—	—	—	—	—		Non-album singles
"Stay Where You Are"	1952	29	—	—	—	—	—	—	—	—	—		Non-album singles
"Congratulations to Someone"	1953	20	—	—	—	—	—	—	—	—	—		Non-album singles
"I'm the King of Broken Hearts"	1953	22	—	—	—	—	—	—	—	—	—		Non-album singles
"Rags to Riches"	1953	1	—	1	—	—	—	—	—	—	—	RIAA: Gold	Non-album singles
"Stranger in Paradise"	1953	2	—	1	—	—	—	—	—	—	1	RIAA: Gold	Alone at Last with Tony Bennett
"Why Does It Have to Be Me"	1953	26	—	—	—	—	—	—	—	—	—		Non-album singles
"There'll Be No Teardrops Tonight"	1954	7	—	—	—	—	—	—	—	—	—		Non-album singles
"Please Driver (Once Around the Park Again)"	1954	29	—	—	—	—	—	—	—	—	—		Alone at Last with Tony Bennett
"Until Yesterday"	1954	25	—	—	—	—	—	—	—	—	—		Non-album single
"Cinnamon Sinner"	1954	8	—	—	—	—	—	—	—	—	—		Because of You
"Not as a Stranger"	1954	27	—	—	—	—	—	—	—	—	—		Non-album singles
"Take Me Back Again"	1954	29	—	—	—	—	—	—	—	—	—		Non-album singles
"Funny Thing"	1954	24	—	—	—	—	—	—	—	—	—		Non-album singles
"Close Your Eyes"	1955	—	—	—	—	—	—	—	—	—	18		Because of You
"Can You Find It in Your Heart?"	1956	16	—	27	—	—	—	—	—	—	—		Non-album singles
"From the Candy Store on the Corner to the Chapel on the Hill"	1956	11	—	45	—	—	—	—	—	—	—		Non-album singles
"Happiness Street (Corner Sunshine Square)"	1956	38	—	23	—	—	—	—	—	—	—		Non-album singles
"The Autumn Waltz"	1956	18	—	—	—	—	—	—	—	—	—		Non-album singles
"Just in Time"	1956	46	—	—	—	—	—	—	—	—	—		Non-album singles
"Come Next Spring"	1956	—	—	—	—	—	—	—	—	—	29		Non-album singles
"One for My Baby (and One More for the Road)"	1957	49	—	—	—	—	—	—	—	—	—		Non-album singles
"In the Middle of an Island"	1957	9	—	3	—	—	—	—	—	—	—		Non-album singles
"I Am"	1957	93	—	—	—	—	—	—	—	—	—		Non-album singles
"Ca, C'est L'Amour"	1957	22	—	39	—	—	—	—	—	—	—		Non-album singles
"Young and Warm and Wonderful"	1958	59	—	5	—	—	—	—	—	—	—		Non-album singles
"Firefly"	1958	20	—	14	—	—	—	—	—	—	—		Non-album singles
"Smile"	1959	73	—	—	—	—	—	—	—	—	—		Non-album singles
"Climb Ev'ry Mountain"	1959	74	—	—	—	—	—	—	—	—	—		Non-album singles
"Till"	1961	—	—	—	—	—	—	—	—	—	35		Non-album singles
"I Left My Heart in San Francisco"	1962	19	7	—	—	—	—	—	—	—	25	RIAA: Gold	I Left My Heart in San Francisco
"I Wanna Be Around"	1963	14	5	62	—	—	—	—	—	—	—		I Wanna Be Around...
"I Will Live My Life for You"	1963	85	—	—	—	—	—	—	—	—	—		I Wanna Be Around...
"The Good Life"	1963	18	7	96	—	—	—	—	—	—	27	RIAA: Gold	I Wanna Be Around...
"Spring in Manhattan"	1963	92	—	—	—	—	—	—	—	—	—		Non-album single
"This Is All I Ask"	1963	70	—	—	—	—	—	—	—	—	—		This Is All I Ask
"True Blue Lou"	1963	99	—	—	—	—	—	—	—	—	—		This Is All I Ask
"Don't Wait Too Long"	1963	54	16	—	—	—	—	—	—	—	—		The Many Moods of Tony
"The Little Boy"	1963	52	—	—	—	—	—	—	—	—	—		The Many Moods of Tony
"The Moment of Truth"^{[B]}	1963	—	—	—	—	—	—	—	—	—	—		This Is All I Ask
"When Joanna Loved Me"	1964	94	—	—	—	—	—	—	—	—	—		The Many Moods of Tony
"A Taste of Honey"	1964	94	19	—	—	—	—	—	—	—	—		The Many Moods of Tony
"It's a Sin to Tell a Lie"	1964	99	—	—	—	—	—	—	—	—	—		When Lights Are Low
"Who Can I Turn To (When Nobody Needs Me)"	1964	33	3	—	—	—	—	—	—	—	—		Who Can I Turn To
"If I Ruled the World"	1965	34	8	—	—	—	—	30	—	—	40		If I Ruled the World: Songs for the Jet Set
"Fly Me to the Moon"	1965	84	17	—	—	—	—	—	—	—	—		If I Ruled the World: Songs for the Jet Set
"The Shadow of Your Smile"	1965	95	8	—	—	—	—	—	—	—	—		The Movie Song Album
"Song from the Oscar"^{[C]}	1966	—	10	—	—	—	—	—	—	—	—		The Movie Song Album
"Baby, Dream Your Dream"	1966	—	27	—	—	—	—	—	—	—	—		For Once in My Life
"Georgia Rose"	1966	89	6	—	—	—	—	—	—	—	—		A Time for Love
"A Time for Love"^{[D]}	1966	—	3	—	—	—	—	—	—	—	—		A Time for Love
"The Very Thought of You"	1966	—	—	—	—	—	—	—	—	—	21		A Time for Love
"What Makes It Happen"	1967	—	10	—	—	—	—	—	—	—	—		Tony Makes It Happen!
"Days of Love"	1967	—	14	—	—	—	—	—	—	—	—		For Once in My Life
"For Once in My Life"	1967	91	8	—	—	—	—	—	—	—	—		For Once in My Life
"A Fool of Fools"^{[E]}	1968	—	12	—	—	—	—	—	—	—	—		Yesterday I Heard the Rain
"Yesterday I Heard the Rain"^{[F]}	1968	—	10	—	—	—	—	—	—	—	—		Yesterday I Heard the Rain
"People"	1969	—	27	—	—	—	—	—	—	—	—		Non-album single
"Over the Sun"	1969	—	34	—	—	—	—	—	—	—	—		I've Gotta Be Me
"Play It Again, Sam"	1969	—	23	—	—	—	—	—	—	—	—		I've Gotta Be Me
"I've Gotta Be Me"	1969	—	29	—	—	—	—	30	—	—	—		I've Gotta Be Me
"MacArthur Park"	1969	—	39	—	—	—	—	—	—	—	—		Tony Sings the Great Hits of Today
"Something"	1970	—	23	—	—	—	—	—	—	—	—		Tony Sings the Great Hits of Today
"(Where Do I Begin) Love Story"^{[G]}	1971	—	—	—	—	—	—	—	—	—	—		Love Story
"Living Together, Growing Together"^{[H]} (with the Mike Curb Congregation)	1972	—	—	—	—	—	—	—	—	—	—		Non-album singles
"Tell Her It's Snowing"	1973	—	38	—	—	—	—	—	—	—	—		Non-album singles
"Life Is Beautiful"	1975	—	49	—	—	—	—	—	—	—	—		Life Is Beautiful
"As Time Goes By"	1976	—	28	—	—	—	—	—	—	—	—		Non-album single
"Moonglow" (with k.d. lang)	1994	—	—	65	—	—	—	—	—	—	—		MTV Unplugged
"New York State of Mind" (with Billy Joel)	2001	—	—	—	—	—	—	—	—	—	—		Playin' with My Friends: Bennett Sings the Blues
"Just in Time" (with Michael Bublé)	2006	—	22	—	—	—	—	—	—	—	—		Duets: An American Classic
"Body and Soul" (with Amy Winehouse)	2011	87	—	97	36	13	30	68	27	9	40		Duets II
"The Lady Is a Tramp"^{[I]} (with Lady Gaga)	2011	—	—	—	—	—	66	—	—	—	188		Duets II
"Don't Get Around Much Anymore" (with Michael Bublé)	2011	—	—	—	—	—	—	—	—	—	—		Duets II
"Anything Goes" (with Lady Gaga)	2014	—	—	—	—	—	—	—	178	—	174		Cheek to Cheek
"I Can't Give You Anything but Love" (with Lady Gaga)	2014	—	—	—	—	—	—	—	173	—	—		Cheek to Cheek
"Winter Wonderland" (with Lady Gaga)	2014	—	—	—	—	—	—	—	—	—	—		Non-album single
"I Get a Kick Out of You" (with Lady Gaga)	2021	—	—	—	—	—	—	—	—	—	—		Love for Sale
"—" denotes releases that did not chart or were not released in that territory.

== Other charted songs ==
List of songs, with selected chart positions, showing year released and album name
Title	Year	Peak chart positions	Album
Title	Year	UK	Album
"White Christmas"	1968	187	Snowfall: The Tony Bennett Christmas Album

== Other appearances ==
Title	Year	Album
"We Shall Overcome" (With Louis Armstrong as part of chorus)	1970	Louis Armstrong and His Friends
"The Way You Look Tonight"	1997	My Best Friend's Wedding: Music from the Motion Picture
"If Yesterday Could Only Be Tomorrow"	2002	Divine Secrets of the Ya-Ya Sisterhood: Music from the Motion Picture
"We're Doing a Sequel" (The Muppets with Lady Gaga and Tony Bennett)	2014	Muppets Most Wanted: An Original Walt Disney Records Soundtrack

== Videography ==
=== Video albums ===
List of video albums
Title	Album details
MTV Unplugged: Tony Bennett	Released: June 28, 1994; Label: Columbia; Formats: VHS
Tony Bennett: An American Classic	Released: November 21, 2006; Label: Columbia; Formats: DVD, Blu-ray
Duets II - The Great Performances	Released: March 2, 2012; Label: Columbia; Formats: DVD, Blu-ray

=== Music videos ===
List of music videos, showing year released and director
Title	Year	Director(s)
"White Christmas"	1987	Geoffrey Edwards
"When Do the Bells Ring for Me"	1989	Neil Pollack
"Steppin' Out with My Baby"	1993	—N/a
"It Could Happen" (with Shawn Colvin)	1994	Ernie Fritz
"Moonglow" (with k.d. lang)	1994	—N/a
"God Bless the Child" (with Billie Holiday)	1997	Christopher Ciccone
"Put on a Happy Face" (with James Taylor)	2006	—N/a
"Sing, You Sinners" (with John Legend)	2006	Jay Krugman
"Blue Velvet" (with k.d. lang)	2011	Unjoo Moon
"Body and Soul" (with Amy Winehouse)	2011	Unjoo Moon
"Don't Get Around Much Anymore" (with Michael Bublé)	2011	Unjoo Moon
"How Do You Keep the Music Playing" (with Aretha Franklin)	2011	Unjoo Moon
"The Way You Look Tonight" (with Faith Hill)	2011	Unjoo Moon
"The Lady Is a Tramp" (with Lady Gaga)	2011	Unjoo Moon
"One for My Baby (and One More for the Road)" (with John Mayer)	2011	Unjoo Moon
"Speak Low" (with Norah Jones)	2011	Unjoo Moon
"Stranger in Paradise" (with Andrea Bocelli)	2011	Unjoo Moon
"This Is All I Ask" (with Josh Groban)	2011	Unjoo Moon
"Yesterday I Heard the Rain" (with Alejandro Sanz)	2011	Unjoo Moon
"Anything Goes" (with Lady Gaga)	2014	Nicole Ehrlich and Harvey White
"I Can't Give You Anything but Love" (with Lady Gaga)	2014	Nicole Ehrlich and Harvey White
"But Beautiful" (with Lady Gaga)	2014	Nicole Ehrlich and Harvey White
"It Don't Mean a Thing" (with Lady Gaga)	2014	Nicole Ehrlich and Harvey White

== Books ==
- Fox, Mark (1996). Tony Bennett: Tracked Down. With Chris Phasey. Backland Publications. ISBN 0-7212-0950-5.

== Notes ==
- A Tony Bennett's Greatest Hits, Vol. III was released under the title Tony's Greatest Hits in the United Kingdom.
- B "The Moment of Truth" did not enter the Billboard Hot 100, but peaked at number 27 on the Bubbling Under Hot 100 Singles chart, which acts as an extension to the Hot 100.
- C "Song from the Oscar" did not enter the Billboard Hot 100, but peaked at number 4 on the Bubbling Under Hot 100 Singles chart, which acts as an extension to the Hot 100.
- D "A Time for Love" did not enter the Billboard Hot 100, but peaked at number 19 on the Bubbling Under Hot 100 Singles chart, which acts as an extension to the Hot 100.
- E "A Fool of Fools" did not enter the Billboard Hot 100, but peaked at number 19 on the Bubbling Under Hot 100 Singles chart, which acts as an extension to the Hot 100.
- F "Yesterday I Heard the Rain" did not enter the Billboard Hot 100, but peaked at number 30 on the Bubbling Under Hot 100 Singles chart, which acts as an extension to the Hot 100.
- G "(Where Do I Begin) Love Story" did not enter the Billboard Hot 100, but peaked at number 14 on the Bubbling Under Hot 100 Singles chart, which acts as an extension to the Hot 100.
- H "Living Together, Growing Together" did not enter the Billboard Hot 100, but peaked at number 11 on the Bubbling Under Hot 100 Singles chart, which acts as an extension to the Hot 100.
- I "The Lady Is a Tramp" did not enter the Billboard Hot 100, but peaked at number 21 on the Bubbling Under Hot 100 Singles chart, which acts as an extension to the Hot 100.
