= For Once in My Life (Tony Bennett album) =

Studio album by Tony Bennett
- Released: December 1967
- Recorded: December 14, 1965 (#8); January 18, 1967 (#7); April 20, 1967 (#2–3, 10); July 18, 1967 (#4–5, 9); September 1, 1967 (#6); October 16, 1967 (#1)
- Studios: CBS Studio A, Los Angeles, California (#8); Columbia 30th Street, New York City (#1–7, 9–10)
- Genre: Vocal jazz
- Length: 27:15
- Label: Columbia
- Producers: Howard A. Roberts (#1–7, 9–10); Ernie Altschuler (#8)

Tony Bennett chronology
Tony Makes It Happen (1967)	For Once in My Life (1967)	Yesterday I Heard the Rain (1968)

Singles from For Once in My Life
- 1. "For Once in My Life" Released: August 24, 1967

For Once in My Life is an album by Tony Bennett, released in December 1967.

Tony Tamburello was the musical director, and Marion Evans, Ralph Burns, and Torrie Zito arranged and conducted their own compositions on the album. Corky Hale played the harp, John Bunch played the piano. Milt Hinton on bass, and Sol Gubin on drums.

The single from the album, "For Once in My Life", debuted on the Billboard Hot 100 in the issue dated October 28, 1967, peaking at number 91 during a five-week run, The song peaked at number eight on the magazine's Easy Listening chart, during its 19-weeks there. and number 94 on the Cashbox singles chart during its six-weeks there. The single was Bennett last hit on the Billboard Hot 100 charts for 44 years until Body and Soul which reached number 85 in 2011.

The album debuted on the Billboard Top LPs chart in the issue dated January 13, 1968, and remained on the album chart for six weeks, peaking at number 178 it also debuted on the Cashbox albums chart in the issue dated February 3, 1968, and remained on the chart for four weeks, peaking at number 91 It entered the UK album chart on March 23, 1968, reaching number 15 over the course of five weeks.

The album was released on compact disc by Beat Goes On on June 30, 2009, as tracks 1 through 10 on a pairing of two albums on one CD with tracks 11 through 23 consisting of Bennett's 1969 album, I've Gotta Be Me

On November 8, 2011, Sony Music Distribution included the CD in a box set entitled The Complete Collection.

== Critical reception ==
Professional ratings
Review scores
Source	Rating
AllMusic	2/5 stars

The album received a two-star rating from AllMusic with its review by William Ruhlmann stating "Bennett made his by-now usual selections of standards ("They Can't Take That Away From Me"), Broadway and Hollywood material, and choices from the catalogs of songwriter favorites such as Leslie Bricusse and Cy Coleman"

Billboard gave the album a positive review, saying it was "full of so many good tunes, both standards and contemporary". Record World referred to the album as a "tastetful, swinging package"

In A Biographical Guide to the Great Jazz and Pop Singers, Will Friedwald described the album as "a terrific" but like Bennett's other albums from the late 1960s, it does not measure up to his "earlier long-playing projects."

== Track listing ==
1. "They Can't Take That Away from Me" (George Gershwin, Ira Gershwin) – 2:45
2. "Something in Your Smile" (Leslie Bricusse) – 2:25
3. "Days of Love" (Paul Francis Webster, David Rose) – 2:21
4. "Broadway Medley: Broadway / Crazy Rhythm / Lullaby of Broadway" – 2:40
5. "For Once in My Life" (Ron Miller, Orlando Murden) – 3:20
6. "Sometimes I'm Happy" (Vincent Youmans, Irving Caesar) – 2:23
7. "Out of This World" (Harold Arlen, Johnny Mercer) – 3:08
8. "Baby, Dream Your Dream" (Cy Coleman, Dorothy Fields) – 1:58
9. "How Do You Say Auf Wiedersehn" (Johnny Mercer, Anthony James Scibetta) – 3:14
10. "Keep Smiling at Trouble" (Buddy DeSylva, Al Jolson, Lewis Gensler) – 3:01

== Charts ==
Chart (1968)	Peak position
US Top LPs (Billboard)	178
US Cash Box	91
UK Albums Chart	15

=== Singles ===
Year	Title	U.S. Hot 100	U.S. Cashbox	U.S. AC
1967	"For Once in My Life"	91	94	8

== Personnel ==
- Tony Bennett – vocals
- Torrie Zito – arranger
- Marion Evans – arranger
- Ralph Burns – arranger
- Tony Tamburello – music coordinator
- Frank Laico – engineer
- Stan Weiss – engineer
- Al Brown – engineer
- John Bunch – piano
- Corky Hale – harp
- Milt Hinton – bass
- Sol Gubin – drums
- Unidentified strings
