= Duets: An American Classic =

Studio album by Tony Bennett
- Released: September 26, 2006
- Recorded: February – June 2006
- Studio: Bennett Studios, Abbey Road Studios, Capitol Studios, Studio at the Palms
- Genre: Traditional pop
- Length: 65:56
- Label: Columbia
- Producer: Phil Ramone

Tony Bennett chronology
The Art of Romance (2004)	Duets: An American Classic (2006)	A Swingin' Christmas (2008)

Singles from Duets: An American Classic
- 1. "Just in Time" Released: September 2006

Professional ratings
Review scores
Source	Rating
AllMusic	3/5 stars
Rolling Stone	3.5/5 stars

Duets: An American Classic is a studio album by Tony Bennett, released in 2006 via Columbia label.

On November 8, 2011, Sony Music Distribution included the CD in a box set entitled The Complete Collection.

== Background ==
The album was released in conjunction with Bennett's 80th birthday the previous month. The songs selected were mostly ones that Bennett had played a major role in introducing into the Great American Songbook.

Unlike some other celebrity duets efforts where performances were recorded separately and then combined by producers, such as Frank Sinatra's 1993 Duets, Bennett was physically present with each of his partners during recording. The vocals were performed live as the band was playing.

== Charts ==
The album debuted at number 3 on The Billboard 200, selling around 202,000 copies in its first week. It spent five consecutive weeks in the top 10 and was certified Gold in less than four weeks. It also reached number one in Canada. The sequel album, Duets II, was released in 2011 in conjunction with Bennett's 85th birthday.

== Grammy Awards ==
The album won the Grammy Award for Best Traditional Pop Vocal Album at the 2007 Grammy Awards. Bennett's duet with Stevie Wonder, "For Once in My Life", also won the Grammy Award for Best Pop Collaboration with Vocals.

== Track listing ==
No.	Title	Writer(s)	Duet partner	Length
1.	"Lullaby of Broadway"	Al Dubin, Harry Warren	Dixie Chicks	3:03
2.	"Smile"	Charles Chaplin, John Turner, Geoff Parsons	Barbra Streisand	4:41
3.	"Put On a Happy Face"	Charles Strouse, Lee Adams	James Taylor	3:15
4.	"The Very Thought of You"	Ray Noble	Paul McCartney	4:01
5.	"The Shadow of Your Smile"	Johnny Mandel, Paul Francis Webster	Juanes	4:34
6.	"Rags to Riches"	Richard Adler, Jerry Ross	Elton John	2:40
7.	"The Good Life"	Sacha Distel, Jack Reardon	Billy Joel	3:20
8.	"Cold, Cold Heart"	Hank Williams	Tim McGraw	3:17
9.	"If I Ruled the World"	Leslie Bricusse, Cyril Ornadel	Celine Dion	2:56
10.	"The Best Is Yet to Come"	Cy Coleman, Carolyn Leigh	Diana Krall	3:39
11.	"For Once in My Life"	Ron Miller, Orlando Murden	Stevie Wonder	3:24
12.	"Are You Havin' Any Fun?"	Sammy Fain, Jack Yellen	Elvis Costello	2:45
13.	"Because of You"	Arthur Hammerstein, Dudley Wilkinson	k.d. lang	4:04
14.	"Just in Time"	Betty Comden, Adolph Green, Jule Styne	Michael Bublé	2:17
15.	"The Boulevard of Broken Dreams"	Dubin, Warren	Sting	3:23
16.	"I Wanna Be Around"	Johnny Mercer, Sadie Vimmerstedt	Bono	3:01
17.	"Sing, You Sinners"	Sam Coslow, W. Franke Harling	John Legend	2:18
18.	"I Left My Heart in San Francisco"	George Cory, Douglass Cross		3:55
19.	"How Do You Keep the Music Playing?"	Alan Bergman, Marilyn Bergman, Michel Legrand	George Michael	5:23
Total length:				65:56

Target bonus tracks
No.	Title	Writer(s)	Duet partner	Length
20.	"I've Got the World on a String"	Harold Arlen, Ted Koehler	Diana Krall
21.	"Steppin' Out With My Baby"	Irving Berlin	Michael Bublé
22.	"I Left My Heart in San Francisco"	Georgy Cory, Douglass Cross	Judy Garland
23.	"The Lady Is a Tramp"	Lorenz Hart, Richard Rodgers	Frank Sinatra

Australian bonus track
No.	Title	Writer(s)	Duet partner	Length
20.	"Steppin' Out With My Baby"	Irving Berlin	Delta Goodrem

Singapore bonus track
No.	Title	Writer(s)	Duet partner	Length
20.	"If I Ruled the World"	Leslie Bricusse, Cyril Ornadel	Leehom Wang

== Personnel ==
- Tony Bennett, guest artists – vocals
- Bill Charlap – piano (track 18)
- Pinchas Zukerman – violin (track 2)
- Pamela Sklar – flute (tracks 5, 11, 13)
- Lawrence Feldman – flute (track 3)
- Chris Botti – trumpet (track 13)
- Paul Langosch – double bass
- Gray Sargent – guitar
- Harold Jones – drums
- Jorge Calandrelli – orchestrator, conductor
- Lee Musiker – piano, arranger, musical direction
- Phil Ramone – producer
- Torrie Zito – conductor, brass arrangement
- Diane Lesser – oboe, English horn (tracks 5, 6, 11, 13)

== Charts ==
=== Weekly charts ===
Chart (2006)	Peak position
Australian Albums (ARIA)	17
Belgian Albums (Ultratop Flanders)	39
Canadian Albums (Billboard)	1
Dutch Albums (Album Top 100)	60
Irish Albums (IRMA)	14
Italian Albums (FIMI)	35
New Zealand Albums (RMNZ)	4
Portuguese Albums (AFP)	14
Scottish Albums (OCC)	15
UK Albums (OCC)	15
US Billboard 200	3

=== Year-end charts ===
Chart (2006)	Position
UK Albums (OCC)	131
US Billboard 200	86

Chart (2007)	Position
US Billboard 200	47

== Certifications ==
Region	Certification	Certified units/sales
Australia (ARIA)	Gold	35,000^{^}
Canada (Music Canada)	2× Platinum	200,000^{^}
Ireland (IRMA)	Gold	7,500^{^}
United Kingdom (BPI)	Gold	100,000^{^}
United States (RIAA)	2× Platinum	1,500,000
Summaries
Worldwide	—	3,000,000
^{^} Shipments figures based on certification alone.
