= Firefly (Cy Coleman song) =

"Firefly" is a song written by Cy Coleman and Carolyn Leigh in 1958, as an audition for the musical Gypsy.

While the song ended up not being used for the musical, it was recorded and popularized by Tony Bennett who went to number 20 on the Billboard Hot 100.

== Recorded versions ==
- Tony Bennett on the album, In Person! (1959)
- Tony Bennett on the album, Tony Bennett: The Playground (1998)
- Tony Bennett and Lady Gaga on the album, Cheek to Cheek (2014)
