= The Essential Tony Bennett =

Compilation album by Tony Bennett
- Released: July 23, 2002
- Recorded: 1951–2001
- Genre: Traditional pop, jazz
- Label: RPM/Columbia/Legacy
- Producer: Danny Bennett, Steve Berkowitz, Didier C. Deutsch

Tony Bennett chronology
Playing with My Friends: Bennett Sings the Blues (2001)	The Essential Tony Bennett (2002)	A Wonderful World (2002)

Limited Edition 3.0
- Limited Edition 3.0

Professional ratings
Review scores
Source	Rating
Allmusic	5/5 stars

The Essential Tony Bennett is a two-CD compilation album by Tony Bennett, released in 2002. The collection is part of a series of Essential sets released by Columbia Records and was created in collaboration with RPM Records and Legacy Recordings.

The compilation includes material from throughout Bennett's career with Columbia, with no recordings after 1970 and before 1986 as Bennett was with other labels or unsigned altogether during that fallow period of his career. The 12-page foldout CD insert contains songwriting, arranging, and producing credits for each track, as well as recording dates and chart positions attained if any. It also contains large photographs of Bennett in the recording studio from early and late periods in his career, as well as thumbnail-sized images of all the albums covers from Bennett's Columbia catalog, in chronological order.

AllMusic describes The Essential Tony Bennett as "an excellent, exhaustive retrospective of a lengthy, hit-filled career at Columbia. ... Bennett surely recorded more great material than can fit on a two-disc, 40-track collection, but this contains the cream of the crop and it's hard to imagine a collection like this being executed better than this."

In 2008, a 3 disc version entitled The Essential Tony Bennett: Limited Edition 3.0 was released.

== Track listing ==
=== Disc one ===
1. "Because of You" (Arthur Hammerstein, Dudley Wilkinson) - 2:56
2. "Cold, Cold Heart" (Hank Williams) 2:37
3. "Blue Velvet" with Percy Faith and His Orchestra (Bernie Wayne, Lee Morris) - 2:59
4. "Rags to Riches" (Richard Adler, Jerry Ross) - 2:48
5. "Stranger in Paradise" with the Ray Charles Singers (Robert Wright, George Forrest, Alexander Borodin) - 3:04
6. "Sing, You Sinners" (Sam Coslow, W. Franke Harling) - 2:15
7. "Boulevard of Broken Dreams" (Dubin, Warren) - 2:30
8. "Just in Time" (Betty Comden, Adolph Green, Jule Styne) - 2:32
9. "It Amazes Me" (Cy Coleman, Carolyn Leigh) - 3:22
10. "Love Look Away" (Richard Rodgers, Oscar Hammerstein II) - 2:45
11. "Firefly" with Count Basie and His Orchestra (Coleman, Leigh) - 1:37
12. "Put on a Happy Face" (Lee Adams, Charles Strouse) - 2:37
13. "The Best is Yet to Come" (Coleman, Leigh) - 2:33
14. "Tender Is the Night" (Sammy Fain, Paul Francis Webster) - 2:40
15. "Once Upon a Time" (Adams, Strouse) - 2:57
16. "I Left My Heart in San Francisco" (George Cory, Douglass Cross) - 2:50
17. "I Wanna Be Around" (Johnny Mercer, Sadie Vimmerstedt) - 2:10
18. "The Good Life" (Sacha Distel, Ray Reardon) - 2:14
19. "This is All I Ask" (Gordon Jenkins) - 3:14
20. "When Joanna Loved Me" (Robert Wells, Jack Segal) - 3:05
21. "The Rules of the Road" (Cy Coleman, Carolyn Leigh) 2:20 (previously unreleased, recorded 1964)

=== Disc two ===
1. "Who Can I Turn To? (When Nobody Needs Me)" (Leslie Bricusse, Anthony Newley) - 2:54
2. "If I Ruled the World" (Bricusse, Cyril Ornadel) - 3:00
3. "Fly Me to the Moon (In Other Words)" (Bart Howard) - 4:11
4. "The Shadow of Your Smile" (Johnny Mandel, Paul Francis Webster) - 3:37
5. "Smile" (John Turner, Geoffrey Parsons) - 3:32
6. "The Very Thought of You" (Ray Noble) - 4:30
7. "For Once in My Life" (Ronald Dean Miller, Orlando Murden) - 3:22
8. "Yesterday I Heard the Rain (Esta Tarde vi Llover)" (Armando Manzanero, Gene Lees) - 3:40
9. "My Favorite Things" (Rodgers, Hammerstein) - 3:17
10. "I Do Not Know a Day I Did Not Love You" (Rodgers, Martin Charnin) 3:27
11. "How Do You Keep the Music Playing?" (Alan Bergman, Marilyn Bergman, Michel Legrand) - 4:20
12. "When Do the Bells Ring for Me?" (Charles DeForest) - 2:57
13. "Night and Day" (Cole Porter) - 3:34
14. "Last Night When We Were Young" (Harold Arlen, Yip Harburg) - 2:26
15. "Steppin' Out With My Baby" (Irving Berlin) - 2:52
16. "It Don't Mean a Thing (If It Ain't Got That Swing)" (Duke Ellington, Irving Mills) - 3:05 [live]
17. "Mood Indigo" (Barney Bigard, Ellington, Mills) - 4:33
18. "Keep the Faith, Baby" (with k.d. lang) (Luchi de Jesus, Lila Lerner, Mayme Watts) - 3:50

From track 19 of Disc One on, most selections are credited with the Ralph Sharon Trio.

=== Disc three (Limited Edition 3.0) ===
1. "Lazy Afternoon" (John Latouche, Jerome Moross) - 2:21
2. "Penthouse Serenade (When We're Alone)" (Val Burton, Will Jason) - 6:17
3. "Lost in the Stars" (Kurt Weill, Maxwell Anderson) - 4:30
4. "My Funny Valentine" (Richard Rodgers & Lorenz Hart) - 2:35
5. "Danny Boy" (F.E. Weatherly) - 4:57 (Previously Unreleased, Recorded 1964)
6. "Quiet Nights of Quiet Stars (Corcovado)" (Antonio Carlos Jobim, Buddy Kaye & Gene Lees) - 3:17
7. "Country Girl" (Robert Farnon) - 3:38
