= Are You Havin' Any Fun? =

1939 song written by Sammy Fain and Jack Yellen

"Are You Havin' Any Fun?" is a song with lyrics by Jack Yellen and music by Sammy Fain. It featured in the Broadway revue series George White's Scandals in 1939, where it was sung by Ella Logan. A popular recording in 1939 was by Tommy Dorsey and His Orchestra with vocals by Edythe Wright.

== Other recordings ==
- Ella Logan recorded the song for Columbia Records on September 26, 1939.
- British musical comedy duo Flanagan and Allen incorporated this in their popular Music Hall act of the 1930s and 1940s:
- Elaine Stritch's recording from her 1956 album Stritch
- Tony Bennett recorded the song on his 1959 album Strike Up the Band with Count Basie,
- In 2006 Bennett re-recorded the song for his album Duets: An American Classic as a duet with Elvis Costello.

== Popular culture ==
- The Tony Bennett recording is featured in the 2012 film Quartet, the first film directed by Dustin Hoffman. The song is also performed in the film by Trevor Peacock and David Ryall, as a homage to Flanagan and Allen, the famous British music hall artists. Peacock and Ryall also perform "Underneath the Arches", a signature song of Flanagan and Allen.
- The Elaine Stritch recording was featured in a UK advertising campaign on YouTube for P&O Cruises from December 2013, and an ad for the Volkswagen ID. Buzz in 2024.
