= Cloud 7 =

Studio album by Tony Bennett
- Released: February 25, 1955
- Recorded: August 6 & December 22, 1954
- Genre: Jazz
- Length: 33:05
- Label: Columbia
- Producer: Mitch Miller

Tony Bennett chronology
| Because of You (1952) | Cloud 7 (1955) | Alone at Last with Tony Bennett (1955) |

Cloud 7 is the second studio album by Tony Bennett, released on February 25, 1955. The album featured material from the Great American Songbook and presented Bennett in a way different from his hit parade material of the early nineteen-fifties using a combo of jazz musicians. The album was arranged by the featured guitarist, Chuck Wayne, and trumpeter Charles Panely and was recorded between August and December 1954.

On November 8, 2011, Sony Music Distribution included the CD in a box set entitled The Complete Collection.

== Reception ==
Professional ratings
Review scores
| Source | Rating |
|---|---|
| AllMusic | 4/5 stars |
| The Encyclopedia of Popular Music | 2/5 stars |

Thom Jurek of AllMusic notes "There is genuine emotion in Bennett's voice as he sings "My Heart Tells Me (Should I Believe My Heart?)," the sultry "Old Devil Moon," "I Can't Believe That You're in Love With Me," and the incredible closer, "Darn That Dream." His delivery throughout is unhurried, focused, purposeful. The music found here is more akin to that of Sinatra's In the Wee Small Hours than it is to lounge mood music -- though that may have been the desired intent of the marketing department at Columbia at the time."

== Track listing ==
Side one

1. "I Fall in Love Too Easily" (Sammy Cahn, Jule Styne) – 2:50
2. "My Baby Just Cares for Me" (Walter Donaldson, Gus Kahn) – 2:21
3. "My Heart Tells Me (Should I Believe My Heart?)" (Mack Gordon, Harry Warren) – 4:54
4. "Old Devil Moon" (Yip Harburg, Burton Lane) – 2:55
5. "Love Letters" (Edward Heyman, Victor Young) – 2:33

Side two

1. "My Reverie" (Larry Clinton, Claude Debussy) – 2:17
2. "Give Me the Simple Life" (Rube Bloom, Harry Ruby) – 4:13
3. "While the Music Plays On" (Irving Mills, Lupin Fein, Emery Heim) – 4:35
4. "I Can't Believe That You're in Love with Me" (Clarence Gaskill, Jimmy McHugh) – 3:09
5. "Darn That Dream" (Eddie DeLange, Jimmy Van Heusen) – 3:18

== Personnel ==
- Tony Bennett – vocals, liner notes
- Dave Schildkraut – alto saxophone
- Charles Panely – trumpet, arranger
- Chuck Wayne – guitar, arranger
- Clyde Lombardi – double bass

Tracks 1 and 4

- Al Cohn – tenor saxophone
- Gene DiNovi – piano
- Sonny Igoe – drums

Other tracks

- Caesar DiMauro – tenor saxophone
- Harvey Leonard – piano
- Ed Shaughnessy – drums

CD additional personnel

- Danny Bennett – executive producer
- Steven Berkowitz – executive producer
- Stacey Boyle – tape research
- Lisa Buckler – project director
- Didier C. Deutsch – reissue producer
- Patti Matheny – artist coordination
- Darcy Proper – reissue producer, mastering
- Darren Salmieri – artist coordination
- Jonathan Schwartz – liner notes
