= Viva Duets =

Studio album by Tony Bennett
- Released: October 22, 2012
- Recorded: Avatar Studios, New York
- Genre: Vocal jazz, Latin
- Length: 37:59
- Label: RPM / Columbia
- Producer: Phil Ramone, Dae Bennett

Tony Bennett chronology
Duets II (2011)	Viva Duets (2012)	Cheek to Cheek (2014)

Viva Duets is a studio album by Tony Bennett, released in October 2012. The album is sung in English, Spanish and Portuguese; and features Latin American singers. Album's adaptations were written by Andres Castro, Edgar Barrera, Miguel Bosé, Ricardo Arjona, Kany Garcia, Thalía, Franco De Vita, Dani Martin, and Mario Molina Montez.

== Track listing ==
No.	Title	Writer(s)	Duet partner	Length
1.	"The Best Is Yet to Come"	Carolyn Leigh, Cy Coleman, Andres Castro, Edgar Barrera	Chayanne	3:38
2.	"The Way You Look Tonight"	Dorothy Fields, Jerome Kern	Thalía	4:02
3.	"Steppin' Out with My Baby"	Irving Berlin	Christina Aguilera	2:02
4.	"For Once in My Life"	Ron Miller, Orlando Murden	Marc Anthony	3:06
5.	"Are You Havin' Any Fun?"	Sammy Fain, Jack Yellen	Dani Martín	2:43
6.	"The Good Life"	Sacha Distel, Jack Reardon, Franco De Vita	Franco De Vita	3:20
7.	"Who Can I Turn To (When Nobody Needs Me)"	Leslie Bricusse, Anthony Newley	Gloria Estefan	3:51
8.	"Just in Time"	Betty Comden, Adolph Green, Jule Styne, Kany Garcia	Juan Luis Guerra	2:16
9.	"Cold, Cold Heart"	Hank Williams	Vicentico	3:16
10.	"I Wanna Be Around"	Johnny Mercer, Sadie Vimmerstedt, Ricardo Arjona	Ricardo Arjona	3:00
11.	"Rags to Riches"	Richard Adler, Jerry Ross, Andres Castro, Edgar Barrera	Romeo Santos	2:39
12.	"Return to Me (Regresa a Mí)"	Danny DiMinno, Carmen Lombardo	Vicente Fernández	3:47
Total length:				37:59

Target edition bonus tracks
No.	Title	Writer(s)	Duet partner	Length
13.	"Don't Get Around Much Anymore"	Duke Ellington, Bob Russell	Miguel Bosé
14.	"Blue Velvet"	Bernie Wayne, Lee Morris	Maria Gadú
15.	"The Way You Look Tonight" (Guitar only)	Fields, Kern	Thalía

== Charts ==
Chart (2012)	Peak position
Argentine Albums (CAPIF)	4
Belgian Albums (Ultratop Flanders)	105
Belgian Albums (Ultratop Wallonia)	177
Australian Albums (ARIA)	38
Spanish Albums (PROMUSICAE)	19
Portuguese Albums (AFP)	8
Canadian Albums (Billboard)	12
US Billboard 200	5
US Top Album Sales (Billboard)	5
US Top Jazz Albums (Billboard)	1

== See also ==
- Tony Bennett discography
