= I've Gotta Be Me (Tony Bennett album) =

Studio album by Tony Bennett
- Released: Early August 1969
- Recorded: November 25, 1968 (#6, 8); January 17, 1969 (#2, 11); February 25, 1969 (#4, 7, 10); March 27, 1969 (#1, 3, 5, 9)
- Studio: Columbia 30th Street (New York City)
- Genre: Vocal jazz
- Length: 36:10
- Labels: Columbia; CS 9882
- Producer: Jimmy Wisner

Tony Bennett chronology
Snowfall: The Tony Bennett Christmas Album (1968)	I've Gotta Be Me (1969)	Tony Sings the Great Hits of Today! (1970)

I've Gotta Be Me is an album by American singer Tony Bennett, originally released in 1969 on Columbia as CS 9882.

The album debuted on the Billboard Top LPs chart in the issue dated September 6, 1969, and remained on the album chart for five weeks, peaking at No. 137.

The album was released on compact disc by Beat Goes On on June 30, 2009 as tracks 11 through 13 on a pairing of two albums on one CD with tracks 1 through 10 along with Bennett's 1967, For Once in My Life.

On November 8, 2011, Sony Music Distribution included the CD in a box set entitled The Complete Collection.

== Reception ==
Professional ratings
Review scores
Source	Rating
The Encyclopedia of Popular Music	2/5 stars
Record Mirror	4/5 stars

In A Biographical Guide to the Great Jazz and Pop Singers, Will Friedwald writes that the album is "terrific" but like Bennett's other albums from the late 1960s, it does not measure up to his "earlier long-playing projects."

== Track listing ==
1. "I've Gotta Be Me" (Walter Marks) – 2:54
2. "Over the Sun" (Jamie Moran Aguirre, Arturo Castro) – 2:50
3. "Play It Again, Sam" (Hal Hackady, Larry Grossman) – 3:43
4. "Alfie" (Burt Bacharach, Hal David) – 3:21
5. "What the World Needs Now Is Love" (Bacharach, David) – 2:44
6. "Baby Don't You Quit Now" (Johnny Mercer, Jimmy Rowles) – 2:50
7. "That Night" (Norman Gimbel, Lalo Schifrin) – 3:17
8. "They All Laughed" (George Gershwin, Ira Gershwin) – 2:44
9. "A Lonely Place" (Johnny Mandel, Paul Francis Webster) – 3:50
10. "Whoever You Are, I Love You" (Bacharach, David) – 4:20
11. "(Theme from) Valley of the Dolls" (André Previn, Dory Previn) – 3:37

== Personnel ==
- Tony Bennett – vocals
- Peter Matz, Torrie Zito – conductor, arranger
- Don Ashworth, Phil Bodner, Wally Kane, Romeo Penque, Pete Fanelli, Sol Schlinger, Joe Soldo, Bobby Tricarico – reeds
- Marky Markowitz, John Bello, Al De Risi, Joe Ferrante, Joe Wilder, Ernie Royal, Marvin Stamm, Snooky Young – trumpet
- Wayne Andre, John Messner, Tony Studd, Chauncey Welsch, Paul Faulise, J. J. Johnson, Fred Zito – trombone
- Joseph De Angelis, Paul Ingraham, Joseph Singer, Jim Buffington, Ray Alonge – French horn
- John Bunch – piano
- Gene Bertoncini, Jim Mitchell, Bucky Pizzarelli – guitar
- Margaret Ross – harp
- Richard Davis, George Duvivier, Milt Hinton, Jack Lesberg, Homer Mensch – bass guitar
- Louie Bellson, Sol Gubin, Mel Lewis – drums
- Dave Carey, Jack Jennings, Phil Kraus – percussion

Strings

- Charles McCraken, George Ricci, Alan Shulman, Harvey Shapiro, Tony Sophos – violoncello
- Lamar Alsop, Max Cahn, Paul Gershman, Emanuel Green, Joe Malin, Marvin Morgenstern, George Ockner, Gene Orloff, John Pintavalle, Matthew Raimondi, Julius Schachter, Gerald Tarack, Raoul Polikian, Max Polikoff, Fred Buldrini, Sylvan Shulman – violin
- Julien Barber, Al Brown, Theodore Israel, Richard Dickler, Harold Furmansky, Harry Zaratzian, Harold Colletta, Harold Furmansky, David Schwartz, Emanuel Vardi – viola
