= Tony (album) =

Studio album by Tony Bennett
- Released: January 14, 1957
- Recorded: June 6 & September 11–13, 1956
- Studio: CBS 30th Street (New York City)
- Genre: Jazz
- Length: 33:27
- Label: Columbia; CL 938
- Producer: Ernie Altschuler

Tony Bennett chronology
Alone at Last with Tony Bennett (1955)	Tony (1957)	The Beat of My Heart (1957)

Professional ratings
Review scores
Source	Rating
AllMusic	4/5 stars
The Encyclopedia of Popular Music	3/5 stars

Tony is the fourth studio album by the American singer Tony Bennett, released in 1957. It reached number 14 on the Billboard album chart in 1957, first appearing February 23 that year, and remaining on the chart for nine weeks. it also debuted on the Cashbox albums chart in the issue dated March 2, 1957, and remained on the chart for two weeks, peaking at number 25

On November 8, 2011, Sony Music Distribution included the CD in a box set entitled The Complete Collection.

== Reception ==
William Ruhlmann of AllMusic said "particularly on the side-ending "I Can't Give You Anything but Love," while Faith's strings provide lush, wistful underpinnings to the often-sad sentiments of the ballads on the second side. Bennett matches the arrangements with his vocal performances, keeping pace with the jazzy horns or soaring above the sweet strings"

Billboard identified the album as a "Review Spotlight on Pouplar Albums" in its review from February 1957, stated "he sings a dozen standards, backed by modern and tasteful arrangement by Ray Conniff"

== Track listing ==
1. "It Had to Be You" (Isham Jones, Gus Kahn) – 2:58
2. "You Can Depend on Me" (Charlie Carpenter, Louis Dunlap, Earl Hines) – 2:14
3. "I'm Just a Lucky So-and-So" (Mack David, Duke Ellington) – 3:29
4. "Taking a Chance on Love" (Vernon Duke, Ted Fetter, John Latouche) – 2:09
5. "These Foolish Things" (Harry Link, Holt Marvell, Jack Strachey) – 3:28
6. "I Can't Give You Anything But Love, Baby" (Dorothy Fields, Jimmy McHugh) – 2:37
7. "Boulevard of Broken Dreams" (Al Dubin, Harry Warren) – 2:32
8. "I'll Be Seeing You" (Sammy Fain, Irving Kahal) – 2:48
9. "Always" (Irving Berlin) – 2:59
10. "Love Walked In" (George Gershwin, Ira Gershwin) – 2:00
11. "Lost in the Stars" (Maxwell Anderson, Kurt Weill) – 3:25
12. "Without a Song" (Edward Eliscu, Billy Rose, Vincent Youmans) – 2:48

Tracks recorded on June 6 (#11), September 11 (#1–4), September 12 (#5, 8, 10, 12), September 13 (#6–7, 9), 1956.

== Personnel ==
- Tony Bennett – vocals
- Orchestra conducted by Ray Conniff (#1–10 & 12) and Percy Faith (#11)
- Gil Evans – arranger
- A. Epstein, A. Howard, Bernard Kaufman, J. Palmer, E. Powell, F. Schwartz, Wolf Taninbaum, W. Versaci, Stan Webb, Milt Yaner – r
- Phil Bodner – alto sax, tenor sax, cl
- Peter Pumiglio – alto sax, cl
- Billy Butterfield, Bernie Glow, Dale McMickle, Jimmy Nottingham, Ernie Royal, Doc Severinsen – trumpet
- Robert Alexander, Larry Altpeter, Albert Godlis, Urbie Green, T. Mitchell, Jack Satterfield – trombone
- Dick Hyman, Bernie Leighton – piano
- D. Arnone, Al Caiola, Chuck Wayne – guitar
- I. Cusikoff, Lucien Schmidt, Alan Schuman – vc
- Frank Carroll – bass
- H. Breuer, William Exiner, M. Grupp – drums
- Mike Stewart – backing vocals

=== Strings ===
- R. Bocho, Julius Brand, Samuel Carmell, Emanuel Green, Julius Held, H. Hoffman, Leo Kruczek, Milton Lomask, Harold Melnikoff, George Ockner, Gene Orloff, Samuel Rand, Julius Schachter – violin
- Sidney Brecher, Richard Dickler – viola
