= Duets II (Tony Bennett album) =

Studio album by Tony Bennett
- Released: September 20, 2011
- Recorded: Spring 2011
- Studio: London, Los Angeles, Tuscany, New York, Nashville
- Genre: Jazz
- Length: 63:15
- Label: Columbia
- Producer: Phil Ramone; Dae Bennett

Tony Bennett chronology
| A Swingin' Christmas (2008) | Duets II (2011) | Viva Duets (2012) |

Singles from Duets II
- 1. "Don't Get Around Much Anymore" Released: August 2, 2011; 2. "Body and Soul" Released: September 14, 2011; 3. "The Lady Is a Tramp" Released: October 3, 2011

Professional ratings
Aggregate scores
| Source | Rating |
|---|---|
| AnyDecentMusic? | 6.9/10 |
| Metacritic | 72/100 |
Review scores
| Source | Rating |
| AllMusic | 3.5/5 stars |
| American Songwriter | 3.5/5 stars |
| Contactmusic.com | 3/5 stars |
| Daily Express | 5/5 |
| The Guardian | 4/5 stars |
| entertainment.ie | 3/5 stars |
| Los Angeles Times | 3/4 stars |
| Rolling Stone | 3/5 stars |
| The Telegraph | 4/5 stars |

Duets II is an album by Tony Bennett, released on September 20, 2011. It was released in conjunction with Bennett's 85th birthday and is a sequel to his previous duet album, Duets: An American Classic. "Don't Get Around Much Anymore" was released on iTunes as a free download on August 2, 2011.

On November 8, 2011, Sony Music Distribution included the CD in a box set entitled The Complete Collection.

== Awards and honors ==
Duets II debuted at No. 1 on the Billboard 200 chart with 179,000 copies sold, making it his first No. 1 album and making Bennett the oldest living musician to debut at No. 1 on the Billboard 200. Duets II achieved Platinum sales status in Canada as certified by Music Canada.

The album won the Grammy Award for Best Traditional Pop Vocal Album in 2012, while Bennett and Amy Winehouse won the Grammy for Best Pop Duo or Group Performance for "Body and Soul".

"Body and Soul" was one of Winehouse's favorite songs, and the track, recorded in March 2011, would become Winehouse's final recording before her death a few months later. "Body and Soul" was Bennett's first entry on the Billboard Hot 100 singles chart in nearly 45 years.

Duets II earned arranger Jorge Calandrelli the Grammy for the Best Instrumental Arrangement Accompanying Vocalist(s) for Bennett's duet with Queen Latifah on the track "Who Can I Turn To (When Nobody Needs Me)." The Anthony Newley and Leslie Bricusse standard was featured in the 1964 London West End and Broadway musical The Roar of the Greasepaint, the Smell of the Crowd. Bennett recorded the song late that year and hit the Billboard Top 40 with the single.

Tony Bennett: Portrait of an Artist, the photography of Kelsey Bennett and Josh Cheuse, was on display at The Morrison Hotel Gallery SoHo. The photo exhibit captured the creative essence during the recording process of the legendary artist's new album.

== Track listing ==
The track listing for Duets II was released through the iTunes Store on August 2, 2011.

| No. | Title | Writer(s) | Duet partner | Length |
|---|---|---|---|---|
| 1. | "The Lady Is a Tramp" | Richard Rodgers; Lorenz Hart | Lady Gaga | 3:18 |
| 2. | "One for My Baby (and One More for the Road)" | Harold Arlen; Johnny Mercer | John Mayer | 2:58 |
| 3. | "Body and Soul" | Edward Heyman; Robert Sour; Frank Eyton; Johnny Green | Amy Winehouse | 3:23 |
| 4. | "Don't Get Around Much Anymore" | Duke Ellington; Bob Russell | Michael Bublé | 2:42 |
| 5. | "Blue Velvet" | Bernie Wayne; Lee Morris | k.d. lang | 4:35 |
| 6. | "How Do You Keep the Music Playing" | Alan Bergman; Marilyn Bergman; Michel Legrand | Aretha Franklin | 5:29 |
| 7. | "The Girl I Love" | George Gershwin; Ira Gershwin | Sheryl Crow | 3:53 |
| 8. | "On the Sunny Side of the Street" | Jimmy McHugh; Dorothy Fields | Willie Nelson | 2:57 |
| 9. | "Who Can I Turn To (When Nobody Needs Me)" | Anthony Newley; Leslie Bricusse | Queen Latifah | 3:53 |
| 10. | "Speak Low" | Kurt Weill; Ogden Nash | Norah Jones | 3:56 |
| 11. | "This Is All I Ask" | Gordon Jenkins | Josh Groban | 4:36 |
| 12. | "Watch What Happens" | Norman Gimbel; Michel Legrand; Jaques Demy | Natalie Cole | 2:10 |
| 13. | "Stranger in Paradise" | Robert Wright; George Forrest; Alexander Borodin | Andrea Bocelli | 5:03 |
| 14. | "The Way You Look Tonight" | Jerome Kern; Dorothy Fields | Faith Hill | 3:55 |
| 15. | "Yesterday I Heard the Rain" | Armando Manzanero Canché; Gene Lees | Alejandro Sanz | 3:44 |
| 16. | "It Had to Be You" | Isham Jones; Gus Kahn | Carrie Underwood | 3:51 |
| 17. | "When Do the Bells Ring for Me" | Charles DeForest | Mariah Carey | 2:52 |
| Total length: | | | | 63:15 |

Target bonus tracks
| No. | Title | Writer(s) | Duet partner | Length |
|---|---|---|---|---|
| 18. | "When You Wish Upon a Star" | Leigh Harline; Ned Washington | Jackie Evancho | 3:44 |
| 19. | "They Can't Take That Away from Me" | George Gershwin; Ira Gershwin | Brad Paisley | 2:59 |
| Total length: | | | | 69:58 |

UK deluxe edition (Tesco exclusive)
| No. | Title | Writer(s) | Duet partner | Length |
|---|---|---|---|---|
| 18. | "When You Wish Upon a Star" | Leigh Harline; Ned Washington | Jackie Evancho | 3:44 |
| 19. | "I've Got the World on a String" | Harold Arlen; Ted Koehler | Diana Krall | 3:07 |
| 20. | "Steppin' Out with My Baby" | Irving Berlin | Michael Bublé | 2:02 |
| 21. | "I Left My Heart in San Francisco" | George Cory; Douglass Cross | Judy Garland | 2:01 |
| Total length: | | | | 74:03 |

== Charts ==
=== Weekly charts ===
| Chart (2011) | Peak position |
|---|---|
| Australian Albums (ARIA) | 2 |
| Austrian Albums (Ö3 Austria) | 7 |
| Belgian Albums (Ultratop Flanders) | 13 |
| Belgian Albums (Ultratop Wallonia) | 11 |
| Canadian Albums (Billboard) | 2 |
| Croatian International Albums (IFPI) | 7 |
| Danish Albums (Hitlisten) | 15 |
| Dutch Albums (Album Top 100) | 6 |
| French Albums (SNEP) | 19 |
| German Albums (Offizielle Top 100) | 19 |
| Greek Albums (IFPI) | 13 |
| Hungarian Albums (MAHASZ) | 36 |
| Irish Albums (IRMA) | 13 |
| Italian Albums (FIMI) | 25 |
| Mexican Albums (AMPROFON) | 12 |
| New Zealand Albums (RMNZ) | 2 |
| Norwegian Albums (VG-lista) | 7 |
| Polish Albums (ZPAV) | 6 |
| Portuguese Albums (AFP) | 5 |
| Scottish Albums (Official Charts) | 6 |
| Spanish Albums (Promusicae) | 7 |
| Swedish Albums (Sverigetopplistan) | 7 |
| Swiss Albums (Schweizer Hitparade) | 14 |
| UK Albums (Official Charts) | 5 |
| US Billboard 200 | 1 |
| US Top Jazz Albums (Billboard) | 1 |

=== Year-end charts ===
| Chart (2011) | Position |
|---|---|
| Australian Albums (ARIA) | 9 |
| Canadian Albums (Billboard) | 27 |
| French Albums (SNEP) | 92 |
| Mexican Albums (AMPROFON) | 73 |
| Polish Albums (ZPAV) | 88 |
| Swedish Albums (Sverigetopplistan) | 62 |
| UK Albums (OCC) | 58 |
| US Billboard 200 | 49 |
| US Top Jazz Albums (Billboard) | 1 |

| Chart (2012) | Position |
|---|---|
| Canadian Albums (Billboard) | 39 |
| US Billboard 200 | 76 |
| US Top Jazz Albums (Billboard) | 2 |

=== Decade-end charts ===
| Chart (2010–2019) | Position |
|---|---|
| Australian Albums (ARIA) | 90 |

== Certifications ==
| Region | Certification | Certified units/sales |
|---|---|---|
| Australia (ARIA) | 2× Platinum | 140,000^{^} |
| Canada (Music Canada) | Platinum | 80,000^{^} |
| Mexico (AMPROFON) | Gold | 30,000^{^} |
| Poland (ZPAV) | Gold | 10,000^{*} |
| Portugal (AFP) | Gold | 7,500^{^} |
| United States (RIAA) | Platinum | 1,000,000^{^} |
^{*} Sales figures based on certification alone.^{^} Shipments figures based on certification alone.
