= The Way You Look Tonight =

1936 song by Jerome Kern and Dorothy Fields

"The Way You Look To-night"
- Label Cover, seen much use and wear

Single by Fred Astaire
- B-side: "Pick Yourself Up"
- Published: July 24, 1936 by Chappell & Co.
- Released: August 1936
- Recorded: July 26, 1936
- Studio: Los Angeles, California
- Genre: Jazz
- Length: 3:09
- Label: Brunswick 7717
- Composer: Jerome Kern
- Lyricist: Dorothy Fields

Fred Astaire singles chronology
| "A Fine Romance" (1936) | "The Way You Look To-night" (1936) | "Never Gonna Dance" (1936) |

"The Way You Look Tonight"

Single by The Lettermen

from the album A Song for Young Love
- B-side: "That's My Desire"
- Released: June 13, 1961
- Recorded: 1961
- Studio: Capitol (Hollywood)
- Genre: Pop, Easy listening
- Length: 2:21
- Label: Capitol 4586
- Producers: Dorothy Fields, Jerome Kern

The Lettermen singles chronology
| "The Way You Look Tonight" (1961) | "When I Fall in Love" (1961) |

"The Way You Look To-night" is a song from the film Swing Time that was performed by Fred Astaire and composed by Jerome Kern with lyrics written by Dorothy Fields. It won the Academy Award for Best Original Song in 1936. Fields remarked, "The first time Jerry played that melody for me I went out and started to cry. The release absolutely killed me. I couldn't stop, it was so beautiful."

In the movie, Astaire sang "The Way You Look To-night" to Ginger Rogers while she was washing her hair in an adjacent room. Astaire's recording was a top seller in 1936. Other versions that year were by Guy Lombardo and Teddy Wilson with Billie Holiday. In June 2026, CBS News included the song in its list of the 250 essential American songs of the past 250 years.

== Composition and publication ==
The song was sung by Fred Astaire in the 1936 film Swing Time in the key of D major, but it is typically performed in E♭ major with a modulation to G♭ major.

It was first copyrighted on March 17, 1936, as "Way (The) you look to-night; song from I won't dance", and was unpublished ("I Won't Dance" was a song from the 1935 film Roberta by Kern and Fields). The next copyright on July 24, 1936, was from Swing Time and was published. Both were renewed in 1963.

== Contemporary recordings ==
Fred Astaire recorded "The Way You Look To-night" in Los Angeles on July 26, 1936. Bing Crosby and his wife Dixie Lee recorded the song as a duet on August 19.

To take advantage of the song's success, pianist Teddy Wilson brought Billie Holiday into a studio 10 weeks after the film Swing Time was released. Holiday was 21 when she recorded "The Way You Look Tonight" with a small group led by Wilson in October 1936.

A number of British dance bands also made contemporary cover recordings of the song: Ambrose (with vocals by Sam Browne), Roy Fox (with vocals by Denny Dennis), Tommy Kinsman, Harry Roy, Carroll Gibbons and the Savoy Hotel Orpheans (vocal by George Melachrino) and Jay Wilbur (with vocals by Sam Costa).

== Cover versions ==
- Six years passed before the song appeared on the charts again, this time in a version by Benny Goodman with Peggy Lee on vocals and Mel Powell on celeste.
- The most popular and imitated version was recorded by Frank Sinatra with the Nelson Riddle orchestra in 1964.
- The Lettermen found their first hit when their version reached No. 13 on the Billboard magazine Hot 100 singles chart in 1961, No. 14 in Canada, and No. 36 on the UK Singles Chart that same year.
- Ella Fitzgerald recorded the song on Ella Fitzgerald Sings The Jerome Kern Songbook.
- Tony Bennett recorded the song on his album Long Ago and Far Away in 1958, and then again with the Ralph Sharon Trio for the film My Best Friend’s Wedding, released in 1997. The singer also recorded two duets of the song: with Faith Hill in 2011 on Duets II and one year later on his album Viva Duets with Thalía. A new version only accompanied by the piano of Bill Charlap was on the album The Silver Lining: The Songs of Jerome Kern in 2015.
- Rod Stewart included the song in his 2002 covers album It Had to Be You.
- Phil Collins included a live version of the song on his 2004 compilation album Love Songs: A Compilation... Old and New.

== Charts ==
=== The Lettermen ===
| Chart (1961) | Peak position |
|---|---|
| Canada CHUM Chart | 14 |
| UK Singles (The Official Charts Company) | 36 |
| US Billboard Hot 100 | 13 |
| US Billboard Easy Listening | 3 |

== Certifications ==
=== Frank Sinatra ===
| Region | Certification | Certified units/sales |
|---|---|---|
| United Kingdom (BPI) | Silver | 200,000^{‡} |
^{‡} Sales+streaming figures based on certification alone.

== See also ==
- List of 1930s jazz standards
