= Long Ago and Far Away (Tony Bennett album) =

Studio album by Tony Bennett
- Released: 1958
- Recorded: April 7–9, 1958
- Venue: Radio Recorders, Los Angeles
- Length: 35:18
- Label: Columbia

Tony Bennett chronology
The Beat of My Heart (1957)	Long Ago and Far Away (1958)	In Person! (1959)

Long Ago and Far Away is the sixth studio album by American singer Tony Bennett, released by Columbia Records in 1958.

It features a mixture of slow ballads with a few slightly jazzy songs including "It Could Happen to You", "Fools Rush In (Where Angels Fear to Tread)", "Long Ago (and Far Away)", and "The Way You Look Tonight".

On November 8, 2011, Sony Music Distribution included the CD in a box set entitled The Complete Collection.

== Reception ==
Professional ratings
Review scores
Source	Rating
Billboard	4/5 stars
The Encyclopedia of Popular Music	3/5 stars

Giving it four stars to indicate "strong sales potential", Billboard described the album as "a fine mood album"

Cashbox said Bennett "plays a wistful tune on some of the finest wistful melodies ever written.

== Track listing ==
1. "It Could Happen to You" (Van Heusen, Burke) – 2:50
2. "Ev'ry Time We Say Goodbye" (Porter) – 3:13
3. "Long Ago and Far Away" (Kern, Gershwin) – 2:55
4. "It Amazes Me" (Coleman, Leigh) – 3:27
5. "The Way You Look Tonight" (Kern, Fields) – 3:08
6. "Be Careful, It's My Heart" (Berlin) – 2:15
7. "My Foolish Heart" (Washington, Young) – 3:09
8. "Time After Time" (Cahn, Styne) – 2:55
9. "Fools Rush In" (Mercer, Bloom) – 2:09
10. "A Cottage for Sale" (Robison, Conley) – 3:04
11. "Blue Moon" (Hart, Rodgers) – 2:32
12. "So Far" (Rodgers, Hammerstein II) – 3:41

Recorded on April 7 (#1, 5, 7), April 8 (#2, 11–12) and April 9 (#3–4, 6, 8–10), 1958.

== Personnel ==
- Tony Bennett – vocals
- Ralph Sharon – piano
- Herbie Mann – flute
- Robert Bai – guitar
- George Van Eps – guitar
- Catherine Gotthoffe – harp
- Dorothy Remsen – harp
- Frank Flynn – vibes
- Buddy Clark – double bass
- Larry Bunker – drums
- William Exiner – drums
- Frank De Vol – conductor

=== Strings ===
- Armond Kaproff (#1, 5, 7), Edgar Lustgarten (#1–2, 5, 7, 11–12), Raphael Kremer – violoncello
- Israel Baker, Robert Barene, Sam Freed, Jacques Gasselin, Ben Gill, Mort Herbert, Dan Lube, William Miller, Lou Raderman, Ambrose Russe, Albert Saparoff, Eudice Shapiro, David Frisina (#2, 11–12), Anatol Kaminsky (#2, 3–4, 6, 8–12) Paul Lowenkron (#2, 3–4, 6, 8–12), Victor Arno (#3–4, 6, 8–10) – violin
- Norman Botnick (#2, 3–4, 6, 8–12), G. R. Menhennick (#3–4, 6, 8–10), Virginia Majewski, Robert Ostrowsky, Joseph Reilich, Milton Thomas – viola
