= Tony Makes It Happen =

Studio album by Tony Bennett
- Released: April 1967
- Recorded: November 26, 1966 (#3, 9); January 12, 1967 (#1, 10–11); January 18, 1967 (#4–5); January 27, 1967 (#2, 6–8)
- Studio: Columbia 30th Street (New York City)
- Genre: Vocal jazz
- Length: 30:20
- Labels: Columbia; CL 2653; CS 9453
- Producer: Ernie Altschuler

Tony Bennett chronology
A Time for Love (1966)	Tony Makes It Happen (1967)	For Once in My Life (1967)

Professional ratings
Review scores
Source	Rating
The Encyclopedia of Popular Music	2/5 stars

Tony Makes It Happen is an album by American singer Tony Bennett, originally released in 1967 on Columbia as CL 2653.

The album debuted on the Billboard Top LPs chart in the issue dated May 13, 1967, and remained on the album chart for six weeks, peaking at No. 178 it also debuted on the Cashbox albums chart in the issue dated April 15, 1967, and remained on the chart for seven weeks, peaking at No. 73 It entered the UK album chart on September 23, 1967, reaching number 31 over the course of three weeks.

On November 8, 2011, Sony Music Distribution included the CD in a box set entitled The Complete Collection.

== Track listing ==
1. "On the Sunny Side of the Street" (Jimmy McHugh, Dorothy Fields) – 2:21
2. "A Beautiful Friendship" (Donald Kahn, Stanley Styne) – 2:28
3. "Don't Get Around Much Anymore" (Duke Ellington, Bob Russell) – 2:02
4. "What Makes It Happen" (Jimmy Van Heusen, Sammy Cahn) – 2:54
5. "The Lady's in Love with You" (Burton Lane, Frank Loesser) – 1:43
6. "Can't Get Out of This Mood" (Jimmy McHugh, Frank Loesser) – 3:40
7. "I Don't Know Why (I Just Do)" (Fred E. Ahlert, Roy Turk) – 3:24
8. "I Let a Song Go Out of My Heart" (Duke Ellington, Irving Mills) – 2:00
9. "Country Girl" (Robert Farnon) – 3:37
10. "Old Devil Moon" (Burton Lane, E.Y. Harburg – 3:00
11. "She's Funny That Way" (Neil Moret, Richard A. Whiting) – 3:11

== Personnel ==
- Tony Bennett – vocals
- Marion Evans – conductor, arranger
- Bobby Tricarico – tenor sax
- Joe Newman, Joe Wilder – trumpet
- Urbie Green – trombone
- Joe Soldo – flute
- John Bunch – piano
- Corky Hale – harp
- Milt Hinton – bass
- Sol Gubin – drums
- Unidentified strings
