= Yesterday I Heard the Rain =

Tony Bennett album

Studio album by Tony Bennett
- Released: July 22, 1968
- Genre: Vocal jazz
- Length: 33:43
- Label: Columbia
- Producer: Howard A. Roberts

Tony Bennett chronology
For Once in My Life (1967)	Yesterday I Heard the Rain (1968)	Snowfall: The Tony Bennett Christmas Album (1968)

Singles from Yesterday I Heard the Rain
- 1. "Fool of Fools" Released: February 14, 1968; 2. "Yesterday I Heard the Rain" Released: April 1, 1968; 3. "Hushabye Mountain" Released: June 21, 1968

Yesterday I Heard the Rain is the twenty-sixth studio album by American singer Tony Bennett, released on July 22, 1968, on Columbia Records. It features a mix of originals and covers songs of "Love Is Here to Stay", "I Only Have Eyes for You", and "There Will Never Be Another You" and includes the singles "A Fool of Fools", the title track, "Yesterday I Heard the Rain", and "Hushabye Mountain".

Tony Tamburello was the musical director, while Torrie Zito arranged and conducted their own compositions on the album. Corky Hale played the harp, John Bunch played the piano, with Milt Hinton on bass and Sol Gubin on drums.

On November 8, 2011, Sony Music Distribution included the album in a CD box set entitled The Complete Collection.

== Reception ==
Billboard believed "The arrangements and orchestrations by Tonle Zito are rich and beautifully lush, and lend the perfect touch to Bennett's smooth style". Cash Box described the album as a "warm, romantic fashion" and stated that "'The title song', 'Love Is Here to Stay', 'I Only Have Eyes For You', and 'There Will Never Be Another You' are standout efforts."

In its Album Pick of the Week section, Record World said "Bennett sings beautifully" on the album which contains a mix of "juicy and lush ballads and uptempo numbers". Variety claimed "The rest of this songalog is a solid mix of oldies and recents ballads".

In a Biographical Guide to the Great Jazz and Pop Singers, Will Friedwald believed the album was "terrific" but like Bennett's other albums from the late 1960s, it did not measure up to his "earlier long-playing projects."

== Singles ==
"A Fool of Fools" bubbled under the Billboard Hot 100 chart in the issue dated March 18, 1968, peaking at number 119, reached number 12 on the magazine's Easy Listening chart. and peaked at number 95 on the Cash Box singles chart. "Yesterday I Heard the Rain" spent two weeks on the Billboard Bubbling Under Hot 100 Singles chart in the issue dated April 28, 1968, peaking at number 130, and reached number ten on the magazine's Easy Listening chart.

== Track listing ==
=== Side one ===
No.	Title	Writer(s)	Length
1.	"Yesterday I Heard the Rain"	Armando Manzanero, Gene Lees	3:42
2.	"Hi-Ho"	George Gershwin, Ira Gershwin	4:42
3.	"Hushabye Mountain" (from the UA release: Chitty Chitty Bang Bang)	Robert Sherman, Richard Sherman	3:16
4.	"Home Is the Place"	Jule Styne, Stephen Sondheim	2:44
5.	"Love Is Here to Stay" (from the UA release: The Goldwyn Follies)	George Gershwin, Ira Gershwin	2:43
6.	"Get Happy" (from the Broadway musical: Nine-Fifteen Revue)	Ted Koehler, Harold Arlen	2:24

=== Side two ===
No.	Title	Writer(s)	Length
1.	"Fool of Fools"	Joseph Meyer, Mann Curtis	2:43
2.	"I Only Have Eyes for You" (from the Warner Bros. Pictures film: Dames)	Harry Warren, Al Dubin	2:36
3.	"Sweet Georgie Fame"	Blossom Dearie, Sandra Harris	3:47
4.	"Only the Young"	Richard Ahlert, Fred Ahlert	3:12
5.	"There Will Never Be Another You" (from the 20th Century Fox Picture: Iceland)	Harry Warren, Mack Gordon	1:54

== Personnel ==
- Tony Bennett – vocals
- Torrie Zito – conductor, arranger
- Tony Tamburello – music coordinator
- Frank Laico – engineer
- Stan Weiss – engineer
- Al Brown – engineer
- John Bunch – piano
- Corky Hale – harp
- Milt Hinton – bass
- Sol Gubin – drums
- Unidentified strings

== Charts ==
Singles

Year	Single	Chart	Peak position
1968	"Fool of Fools"	US Billboard Bubbling Under Hot 100	119
1968	"Fool of Fools"	US Billboard Easy Listening	12
1968	"Fool of Fools"	US Cash Box Top 100	95
1968	"Yesterday I Heard the Rain"	US Billboard Bubbling Under Hot 100	130
1968	"Yesterday I Heard the Rain"	US Billboard Easy Listening	10
