= In Person! =

Studio album by Tony Bennett with the Count Basie Orchestra
- Released: March 1959
- Recorded: December 22 & 30, 1958
- Studio: CBS 30th Street (New York City)
- Genre: Jazz
- Length: 33:55
- Label: Columbia; CL 1294; CS 8104
- Producer: Al Ham

Tony Bennett chronology
Long Ago and Far Away (1958)	In Person! (1959)	Strike Up the Band (1959)

Count Basie Orchestra chronology
Breakfast Dance and Barbecue (1959)	In Person! (1959)	Strike Up the Band (1959)

In Person! is a 1959 album by Tony Bennett, accompanied by the Count Basie Orchestra.

The album was originally intended to be a live recording of a November 1958 performance at Philadelphia's Latin Casino, but the mono recording of the concert was disregarded by producer Al Ham who wanted the album recorded in stereo. Bennett and Basie were then reunited in the studio a month later to recreate the live concert. Fake applause was dubbed onto the original release of In Person! by Ham, and placed in incorrect places on the album. The effect was poorly received and removed for the album's 1994 re-issue. In his autobiography, The Good Life, Bennett wrote that "I never understood why we didn't release the live version. The whole attempt at fabricating an audience was in bad taste" and that as a result of the experience he had always preferred the second album he recorded with Basie that year, Strike Up the Band.

Basie and Bennett recorded two albums together in 1959; In Person! was released by Bennett's record label, Columbia, and Strike Up the Band was released by Basie's label, Roulette.

On November 8, 2011, Sony Music Distribution included the CD in a box set entitled The Complete Collection.

== Reception ==
Professional ratings
Review scores
Source	Rating
AllMusic	3.5/5 stars
Record Mirror	4/5 stars
The Encyclopedia of Popular Music	3/5 stars

Billboard magazine chose In Person! as one of their "Spotlight Winners of the Week" in March 1959, and wrote that "The drive of the Bennett vocals is excellently paced by the swingin' Basie crew. Tunes are nicely paced and varied. It's an exciting set that builds track after track".

In sharp contrast, Ralph J. Gleason in the July 1959 edition of HiFi Review called the record "disappointing" and opined that it "brings out all the faults of Bennett," that "Tony Bennett really can't sing well enough to earn the support of a band like this" and that the performance suffered from "poor intonation, poor phrasing and great determination to be dramatic."

Record Mirror said the album "features an exciting and clever selection of songs"

Bruce Eder positively reviewed the 1994 re-issue of In Person! for AllMusic, and wrote that "Bennett's sensitively nuanced intonation in the opening of 'Pennies from Heaven' is now up close and personal, while the band's beat in the second half of the song is now crisper and more solid than ever. Ralph Sharon, Bennett's usual accompanist, is handling the piano chores (while Basie himself is credited as leader), and his finely articulated playing is also brought out crisply on 'Lost in the Stars' and other tracks. It's all worth hearing, and more often than just once—it was records like this, as reconstituted properly for CD, that constituted the absolute golden end of the pop legacy of the late '50s."

== Track listing ==
1. "Just in Time" (Betty Comden, Adolph Green, Jule Styne) – 1:45
2. "When I Fall in Love" (Edward Heyman, Victor Young) – 2:20
3. "Taking a Chance on Love" (Vernon Duke, Ted Fetter, John La Touche) – 1:57
4. "Without a Song" (Edward Eliscu, Billy Rose, Vincent Youmans) – 3:06
5. "Fascinating Rhythm" (Gershwin, Ira Gershwin) – 1:30
6. "(In My) Solitude" (Eddie DeLange, Duke Ellington, Irving Mills) – 3:35
7. "Pennies from Heaven" (Johnny Burke, Arthur Johnston) – 2:33
8. "Lost in the Stars" (Maxwell Anderson, Kurt Weill) – 4:01
9. "Firefly" (Cy Coleman, Carolyn Leigh) – 1:39
10. "There Will Never Be Another You" (Mack Gordon, Harry Warren) – 3:16
11. "Lullaby of Broadway" (Al Dubin, Warren) – 3:13
12. "Ol' Man River" (Oscar Hammerstein II, Jerome Kern) – 5:00

== Personnel ==
- Tony Bennett – vocals

The Count Basie Orchestra:

- Thad Jones, Joe Newman, Snooky Young, Wendell Culley – trumpet
- Henry Coker, Benny Powell, Al Grey – trombone
- Marshal Royal – alto sax, clarinet
- Frank Wess – alto and tenor saxes, flute
- Frank Foster – tenor sax, flute
- Billy Mitchell – tenor sax, clarinet
- Charlie Fowlkes – baritone sax, flute, bass clarinet
- Freddie Green – electric guitar
- Ralph Sharon – piano, arranger
- Eddie Jones – double bass
- Candido Camero – bongos
- Sonny Payne – drums

== Other credits ==
- Al Ham – producer
- Didier C. Deutsch – associate producer
- Al Ham – associate producer
- Frank Laico – engineer
- Cliff Morris – engineer
- Seymour Mednick – photography
- Kevin Boutote – mastering
- Bob Burns – contractor
