= Because of You (Tony Bennett album) =

Studio album by Tony Bennett
- Released: September 1952
- Recorded: April 17, 1950 – September 13, 1956
- Studio: CBS 30th Street (New York City)
- Genres: Traditional pop, vocal jazz
- Length: 22:44 1952 LP; 33:06 1956 LP
- Labels: Columbia; CL 6221

Tony Bennett chronology
| Because of You (1952) | Cloud 7 (1955) |

Singles from Because of You
- 1. "Because of You"; 2. "I Won't Cry Anymore"; 3. "Cold Cold Heart"

Alternative cover
- 1956 LP (CL 2550)

Because of You is the debut studio album by American singer Tony Bennett. It was originally released in 1952 on Columbia as CL 6221, then reissued in 1956 (CL 2550) as part of "House Party Series".

On November 8, 2011, Sony Music Distribution included the CD in a box set entitled The Complete Collection.

== Track listing ==
1952 10" LP (CL 6221)

1. "Boulevard of Broken Dreams" – 2:59
2. "I Wanna Be Loved" – 3:24
3. "Once There Lived a Fool" – 2:48
4. "The Valentino Tango" – 2:39
5. "I Won't Cry Anymore" – 2:48
6. "Because of You" – 3:00
7. "While We're Young" – 2:23
8. "Cold Cold Heart" – 2:43

1956 10" House Party LP (CL 2550)

1. "Because of You" – 3:00
2. "The Boulevard of Broken Dreams" – 2:59
3. "Close Your Eyes" – 2:02
4. "I Can't Give You Anything But Love" – 2:07
5. "May I Never Love Again" – 3:11
6. "Cinnamon Sinner" – 3:02

CL 6221 tracks recorded on April 17, 1950 (#1), April 20, 1950 (#2), December 6, 1950 (#3), January 17, 1951 (#4), April 4, 1951 (#5–6) and May 31, 1951 (#7–8). The track number refers to the original 1952 LP.

CL 2550 new tracks recorded on:

- "Close Your Eyes" (July 31, 1953)
- "Cinnamon Sinner" (May 13, 1954)
- "May I Never Love Again" (May 8, 1955)
- "I Can't Give You Anything But Love" (September 13, 1956)

There has been confusion over CL 2550 but the House Party series were always 10" cut down albums and this one featured the 6 tracks shown on the album cover.

== Personnel ==
- Tony Bennett – vocals
- Various orchestral players conducted by Percy Faith (#5–8) and Marty Manning (#1–4).
