= With Love (Tony Bennett album) =

Studio album by Tony Bennett
- Released: 1972
- Recorded: October 5–6, 1971; February 26, 1972
- Genre: Vocal jazz
- Length: 33:38
- Label: Columbia; KC 31460

Tony Bennett chronology
Summer of '42 (1972)	With Love (1972)	The Good Things in Life (1973)

Professional ratings
Review scores
Source	Rating
The Encyclopedia of Popular Music	3/5 stars

With Love is an album by Tony Bennett, released in 1972. The album peaked at number 167 on the Billboard Top LPs & Tape chart.

On November 8, 2011, Sony Music Distribution included the CD in a box set entitled The Complete Collection.

== Track listing ==
1. "The Riviera" (Cy Coleman, Joseph Allen McCarthy) – 2:45
2. "Remind Me" (Jerome Kern, Dorothy Fields) – 3:51
3. "Here's That Rainy Day" (Johnny Burke, Jimmy Van Heusen) – 2:43
4. "Street of Dreams" (Sam M. Lewis, Victor Young) – 3:05
5. "Love" (Ralph Blane, Hugh Martin) – 2:56
6. "Twilight World" (Johnny Mercer, Marian McPartland) – 3:04
7. "Lazy Day in Love" (Robert Farnon, Milt Raskin) – 2:57
8. "Easy Come, Easy Go" (Johnny Green, Edward Heyman) – 3:00
9. "Harlem Butterfly" (Johnny Mercer) – 2:27
10. "Dream (When You're Feeling Blue)" (Johnny Mercer) – 2:45
11. "Maybe This Time" (Fred Ebb, John Kander) – 4:05

== Personnel ==
- Tony Bennett – vocals
- John Bunch – piano
- Robert Farnon – arranger, conductor
