= Body and Soul (1930 song) =

Popular song and jazz standard

Song
- Published: 1930 by Harms
- Genre: Jazz
- Composer: Johnny Green
- Lyricists: Edward Heyman; Robert Sour; Frank Eyton

"Body and Soul" is a popular song and jazz standard written in 1930 with music by Johnny Green and lyrics by Edward Heyman, Robert Sour and Frank Eyton. It was also used as the musical theme and underscoring in the American film noir boxing drama Body and Soul.

== Background ==
"Body and Soul" was written in New York City for the British actress and singer Gertrude Lawrence, who introduced it to London audiences. Published in England, it was first performed in the United States by Libby Holman in the 1930 Broadway revue Three's a Crowd. In Britain the orchestras of Jack Hylton and Ambrose recorded the ballad first in the same week in February 1930. In the United States, the piece grew quickly in popularity, and by the end of 1930 at least 11 American bands had recorded it. Louis Armstrong was the first jazz musician to record "Body and Soul", in October 1930, but it was Paul Whiteman and Jack Fulton who popularized it in United States.

"Body and Soul" is one of the most recorded jazz standards, and multiple lyrics have been written for it.

== Musical characteristics ==
"Body and Soul" is usually performed in the key of D-flat major. There is a verse that precedes the chorus, that is rarely performed, although recordings by both Libby Holman and Billie Holiday include it. The main part of the tune consists of a repeated eight-bar melody, followed by an eight-bar bridge and a final eight-bar return to the melody. The 32-bar AABA form is typical of popular songs of the time. The "A" section uses conventional chord progressions including ii–V–I turnarounds in the home key of D flat, however the bridge is highly unusual in its tonal center shifts: it is in D major. It has been described as "a bridge like no other". "Body and Soul" is considered a challenging piece to solo over; however, the unusual nature of the chords provides a "large degree of improvisational freedom".

== Notable recordings ==
=== Coleman Hawkins ===
"Body and Soul"

Single by Coleman Hawkins
- Recorded: October 11, 1939
- Studio: RCA Studios (New York City)
- Genre: Jazz
- Length: 3:00
- Label: Bluebird
- Songwriters: Edward Heyman; Robert Sour; Frank Eyton; Johnny Green

One of the most famous and influential takes was recorded by Coleman Hawkins and His Orchestra on October 11, 1939, at their only recording session for Bluebird, a subsidiary of RCA Victor. The recording is unusual in that the song's melody is only hinted at in the recording; Hawkins' two-choruses of improvisation over the tune's chord progression constitute almost the entire take. Jazz critic Leonard Feather says, "This became his biggest hit and established him as a national name." Because of this, as well as the imaginative use of harmony and break from traditional swing cliches, the recording is recognised as part of the "early tremors of bebop". In 2004, the Library of Congress entered it into the National Recording Registry.

=== Frank Sinatra and Bobby Hackett ===
On November 9, 1947, Frank Sinatra recorded "Body and Soul" with jazz trumpet player Bobby Hackett and a large orchestra arranged and conducted by Alex Stordahl for Columbia Records. This recording was held back until June 1949, when it was one of the eight recordings on Sinatra's fourth Columbia album, Frankly Sentimental. Since then, two alternate takes have been released by Columbia. Two takes begin with Hackett's trumpet, one, the longest, begins with the orchestra, then Hackett's trumpet. The takes can also be distinguished by their running times. The first take is 3:15. The second, released on the LP "Reflections" in 1960, runs 3:20. And the third, released in 1967 on the album "The Essential Frank Sinatra", runs 3:23.

Sinatra expert Charles Granada explains the significance of this recording in his note on the first CD release of the third released take (listed here as 3:24):

In addition to ["Body and Soul's"] revered status as a pop and jazz standard, Sinatra's superb interpretation (along with that of the late Billie Holiday) could be considered the ultimate vocal rendition. A crossroad of sorts, this performance finds Sinatra beginning to inject some of the pain of his personal life into the music; the singer delving deep within his soul, struggling to extract every nuance of emotion possible, to bring the complex lyric and melodic subtleties intended by the songwriters sharply into focus. As well, his tonal quality reflects much of the aching, melancholic mood that would fully emerge (and become so poignant) just a short time later, in the late Columbia period.

=== Tony Bennett and Amy Winehouse ===
"Body and Soul"

Single by Tony Bennett and Amy Winehouse

from the album Duets II and Lioness: Hidden Treasures
- Released: September 14, 2011
- Recorded: March 23, 2011
- Studio: Abbey Road Studios (London)
- Genre: Jazz; pop
- Length: 3:20
- Label: Sony; Island
- Songwriters: Edward Heyman; Robert Sour; Frank Eyton; Johnny Green
- Producer: Phil Ramone

Tony Bennett singles chronology
"Just In Time" (2006)	"Body and Soul" (2011)	"The Lady Is a Tramp" (2011)

Amy Winehouse singles chronology
"B Boy Baby" (2007)	"Body and Soul" (2011)	"Our Day Will Come" (2011)

"Body and Soul" was recorded as a duet by Tony Bennett and Amy Winehouse on March 23, 2011. It was the final recording made by Winehouse, who died on July 23, 2011 at the age of 27. The single was released worldwide on September 14, 2011, what would have been her 28th birthday, on iTunes, MTV and VH1.

When the song reached number 87 on the Billboard Hot 100 for the week of October 1, 2011, it made Bennett, at age 85, the oldest living artist to chart on the Hot 100. It also gave Bennett the longest overall span of appearances on the Hot 100; his version of "Young and Warm and Wonderful" appeared on the very first Hot 100 chart, for the week of August 4, 1958. The song received a Grammy Award at the 54th Grammy Awards in the Best Pop Duo/Group Performance category on February 12, 2012. Proceeds from "Body and Soul" go to benefit The Amy Winehouse Foundation, an organisation created to raise awareness and support for young adults struggling with addiction.

== See also ==
- List of 1930s jazz standards
