= The Art of Romance =

Studio album by Tony Bennett
- Released: November 19, 2004
- Recorded: 2004
- Genre: Jazz, vocal jazz
- Length: 47:01
- Label: Columbia
- Producer: Phil Ramone

Tony Bennett chronology
A Wonderful World (2002)	The Art of Romance (2004)	Duets: An American Classic (2006)

Professional ratings
Review scores
Source	Rating
Allmusic	4/5 stars

The Art of Romance is an album by Tony Bennett, released in 2004, that won the Grammy Award for Best Traditional Pop Vocal Album. Bennett became a songwriter for the first time in his long career by writing the lyrics for the song "All for You".

On November 8, 2011, Sony Music Distribution included the CD in a box set entitled The Complete Collection.

== Track listing ==
1. "Close Enough for Love" (Johnny Mandel, Paul Williams) – 4:28
2. "All in Fun" (Oscar Hammerstein II, Jerome Kern) – 4:08
3. "Where Do You Start" (Alan Bergman, Marilyn Bergman, Mandel) – 3:42
4. "Little Did I Dream" (Dave Frishberg, Mandel) – 3:45
5. "I Remember You" (Johnny Mercer, Victor Schertzinger) – 5:06
6. "Time to Smile" (Geoffery Clarkson, Mercer) – 3:24
7. "All for You" (Tony Bennett, Django Reinhardt) – 4:35
8. "The Best Man" (Roy Alfred, Fred Wise) – 2:52
9. "Don't Like Goodbyes" (Harold Arlen, Truman Capote) – 4:15
10. "Being Alive" (Stephen Sondheim) – 3:52
11. "Gone with the Wind" (Herb Magidson, Allie Wrubel) – 4:16

== Personnel ==
- Tony Bennett – vocals
- Phil Woods – saxophone
- Lee Musiker – piano, arranger
- Paul Langosch – double bass
- Gray Sargent – guitar
- Clayton Cameron – drums
- Candido Camero – conga
- Johnny Mandel – arranger, conductor
- Jorge Calandrelli – arranger
- Jesse Levy – conductor, orchestra contractor
