= Tony Bennett's "Something" =

Studio album by Tony Bennett
- Released: October 14, 1970
- Recorded: 17, 18, November, 1969, April 2, 3, August 11, 13, 1970
- Genre: Vocal jazz
- Length: 52:30
- Labels: Columbia; C 30280
- Producer: Teo Macero

Tony Bennett chronology
Tony Sings the Great Hits of Today! (1970)	Tony Bennett's "Something" (1970)	Love Story (1971)

Professional ratings
Review scores
Source	Rating
Allmusic	2/5 stars

Tony Bennett's "Something" is a 1970 studio album by Tony Bennett. As with Bennett's previous album, Tony Sings the Great Hits of Today!, it contains renditions of contemporary pop songs, including "Something", which had appeared on the earlier release. In recording Something, Bennett largely avoided the physical disgust he had with the previous album, a change that an AllMusic review credited to more tasteful arrangements.

The album cover shows Bennett embracing his infant daughter, Joanna.

The album peaked at No. 193 on the Billboard Top LPs, during a two-week run on the chart.

On November 8, 2011, Sony Music Distribution included the CD in a box set entitled The Complete Collection.

== Track listing ==
1. "Something" (George Harrison) – 3:19
2. "The Long and Winding Road" (John Lennon, Paul McCartney) – 4:43
3. "Everybody's Talkin'" (Fred Neil) – 3:41
4. "On a Clear Day (You Can See Forever)" (Burton Lane, Alan Jay Lerner) – 3:40
5. "Coco" (Lerner, André Previn) – 3:00
6. "Think How It's Gonna Be" (Lee Adams, Charles Strouse) – 3:53
7. "Wave" (Antonio Carlos Jobim) – 4:37
8. "Make It Easy on Yourself" (Burt Bacharach, Hal David) – 4:32
9. "Come Saturday Morning" (Fred Karlin, Dory Previn) – 4:25
10. "When I Look in Your Eyes" (from the film 'Doctor Doolittle') (Leslie Bricusse) – 3:45
11. "Yellow Days" (Alan Bernstein, Álvaro Carrillo) – 4:01
12. "What a Wonderful World" (Bob Thiele, George David Weiss) – 4:22

== Personnel ==
- Tony Bennett – vocal
- Peter Matz – arranger, conductor
