= Snowfall: The Tony Bennett Christmas Album =

- Original LP cover art

Studio album by Tony Bennett
- Released: 1968
- Recorded: June 1967 (#2–3, 6–7); CTS Bayswater, London; October 1, 1968 (#1, 4–5, 8–10); 30th Street Studios, New York City
- Genre: Christmas
- Length: 29:07 original LP
- Label: Columbia
- Producer: Jack Gold

Tony Bennett chronology
Yesterday I Heard the Rain (1968)	Snowfall: The Tony Bennett Christmas Album (1968)	I've Gotta Be Me (1969)

Snowfall: The Tony Bennett Christmas Album is the twenty-seventh studio album and first Christmas album by Tony Bennett. It was arranged and conducted by Robert Farnon.

Even though they had been friends since the early 1950s, Bennett and Farnon had not recorded together before, Bennett having such reverence for Farnon's work that he felt he "wasn't ready...(and) not developed enough as an artist to record with him". Farnon, who normally recorded in London, came to New York City for one of the two sessions that produced this album. Six tracks were recorded at Columbia's recording studios in New York City, and four in London.

In Bennett's autobiography, he recalls that the New York session was attended by such notable American arrangers as Don Costa, Marion Evans and Torrie Zito, all curious to see how Farnon worked. Quincy Jones subsequently threw a party for Farnon in New York City, and at the party there were so many famous musicians that Jones joked, "If a bomb goes off in this apartment, there won't be any more records made!"

The album debuted on Billboard magazine's Christmas Albums sales chart in the issue dated December 14, 1968, and peaked at number 10. The album was reissued on CD in 1994 with new cover art and a bonus track, "I'll Be Home for Christmas", recorded during a live appearance by Bennett on The Jon Stewart Show. It was reissued once more in 2007, again with different cover art and including a bonus DVD containing excerpts from Bennett's 1992 television special Tony Bennett: A Family Christmas.

Sony Music Distribution included this CD in a box set entitled The Complete Collection, which was released on November 8, 2011.

== Reception ==
Professional ratings
Review scores
Source	Rating
AllMusic	5/5 stars
The Encyclopedia of Popular Music	3/5 stars

Billboard wrote Tony "weaves a very delightful holiday spirit with such favorites as 'White Christmas', 'My Favorite Things', 'Silent Night', and 'Snowfall'." Cash Box highlighted Bennett's "inimitable readings of 'My Favorite Things', 'The Christmas Song', 'White Christmas', 'Winter Wonderland' and a host of others." Record World referred to it as "Smooth and enticing".

William Ruhlmann of AllMusic described the album as "a swinging affair" and noted that "Bennett's warm style was especially winning on this kind of material, making an inevitable assignment a winning combination of singer and songs."

== Track listing ==
Side one
No.	Title	Writer(s)	Length
1.	"Snowfall"	Claude Thornhill, Ruth Thornhill	2:52
2.	"My Favorite Things"	Oscar Hammerstein II, Richard Rodgers	3:17
3.	"The Christmas Song"	Mel Tormé, Bob Wells	2:36
4.	"Santa Claus Is Coming to Town"	J. Fred Coots, Haven Gillespie	2:38
5.	"Medley: We Wish You a Merry Christmas/Silent Night/O Come All You Faithful/Jingle Bells/Where Is Love?"	Traditional/Josef Mohr, Franz Xaver Gruber/John Francis Wade/James Pierpont/Lionel Bart	5:47

Side two
No.	Title	Writer(s)	Length
6.	"Christmasland"	Dennis Farnon, Brian Farnon	2:23
7.	"I Love the Winter Weather/I've Got My Love to Keep Me Warm"	Ticker Freeman, Earl Brown/Irving Berlin	2:11
8.	"White Christmas"	Berlin	2:05
9.	"Winter Wonderland"	Felix Bernard, Dick Smith	2:15
10.	"Have Yourself a Merry Little Christmas"	Ralph Blane, Hugh Martin	3:03
Total length:			29:08

1994 CD reissue
No.	Title	Writer(s)	Length
1.	"My Favorite Things"	Oscar Hammerstein II, Richard Rodgers	3:17
2.	"The Christmas Song"	Mel Tormé, Bob Wells	2:36
3.	"Santa Claus Is Coming to Town"	J. Fred Coots, Haven Gillespie	2:38
4.	"Medley: We Wish You a Merry Christmas/Silent Night/O Come All You Faithful/Jingle Bells/Where Is Love?"	Traditional/Josef Mohr, Franz Xaver Gruber/John Francis Wade/James Pierpont/Lionel Bart	5:47
5.	"Christmasland"	Dennis Farnon, Brian Farnon	2:23
6.	"I Love the Winter Weather/I've Got My Love to Keep Me Warm"	Ticker Freeman, Earl Brown/Irving Berlin	2:11
7.	"White Christmas"	Berlin	2:05
8.	"Winter Wonderland"	Felix Bernard, Dick Smith	2:15
9.	"Have Yourself a Merry Little Christmas"	Ralph Blane, Hugh Martin	3:03
10.	"Snowfall"	Claude Thornhill, Ruth Thornhill	2:52
11.	"I'll Be Home for Christmas"	Buck Ram, Kim Gannon, Walter Kent	2:02
Total length:			31:10

== Personnel ==
- Tony Bennett – vocal
- Robert Farnon – arrangement, conducting
- Jack Gold – producer

== Charts ==
Chart performance for Snowfall: The Tony Bennett Christmas Album
Chart (2018–2023)	Peak position
Danish Albums (Hitlisten)	26
Dutch Albums (Album Top 100)	72
Lithuanian Albums (AGATA)	62
Swedish Albums (Sverigetopplistan)	24

== Certifications ==
Certifications for Snowfall: The Tony Bennett Christmas Album
Region	Certification	Certified units/sales
United States (RIAA)	Platinum	1,000,000^{‡}
^{‡} Sales+streaming figures based on certification alone.
