= Strike Up the Band (Tony Bennett and Count Basie album) =

1959 studio album by Tony Bennett with the Count Basie Orchestra

Studio album by Tony Bennett and the Count Basie Orchestra
- Released: May 1959
- Recorded: January 3 & 5, 1959
- Studio: Capitol (New York)
- Genre: Vocal jazz
- Length: 27:01
- Label: Roulette; SR-25072; SR-25231
- Producer: Teddy Reig

Tony Bennett chronology
In Person! (1959)	Strike Up the Band (1959)	Hometown, My Town (1959)

Count Basie Orchestra chronology
In Person! (1959)	Strike Up the Band (1959)	Breakfast Dance and Barbecue (1959)

Alternative cover
- Basie Swings, Bennett Sings (SR-25072)

Strike Up the Band is a 1959 studio album by Tony Bennett with the Count Basie Orchestra. The album was released at first with the title Basie Swings, Bennett Sings as SR-25072, featuring a different cover and track order.

Bennett and Count Basie recorded two albums together in 1959. The other one, In Person!, was released by Bennett's record label, Columbia, while this album was released by Roulette, Basie's label.

On November 8, 2011, Sony Music Distribution included the CD in a box set entitled The Complete Collection.

== Reception ==
Professional ratings
Review scores
Source	Rating
AllMusic	5/5 stars
The Encyclopedia of Popular Music	4/5 stars

Cashbox believed that "an electric excitement emanates from every groove as the two prove they are an unbeatable combination on such tasty items as “Jeepers Creepers,” “Anything Goes,” “Strike Up The Band,” and .“I Guess I’ll Have To Change My Plans.’

William Ruhlmann of AllMusic wrote: "The band raves through tunes like 'With Plenty of Money and You', and Bennett matches them, drawing strength from the bravura arrangements, while band and singer achieve a knowing tenderness on 'Growing Pains'."

== Track listing ==
Side one

1. "Strike Up the Band" (George Gershwin, Ira Gershwin) – 1:33
2. "I Guess I'll Have to Change My Plan" (Howard Dietz, Arthur Schwartz) – 1:44
3. "Chicago" (Fred Fisher) – 2:07
4. "With Plenty of Money and You" (Al Dubin, Harry Warren) – 1:33
5. "Anything Goes" (Cole Porter) – 2:20
6. "Life Is a Song" (Fred E. Ahlert, Joe Young) – 2:49

Side two

1. "I've Grown Accustomed to Her Face" (Alan Jay Lerner, Frederick Loewe) – 3:02
2. "Jeepers Creepers" (Johnny Mercer, Warren) – 2:08
3. "Growing Pains" (Dorothy Fields, Schwartz) – 3:33
4. "Poor Little Rich Girl" (Noël Coward) – 3:30
5. "Are You Havin' Any Fun?" (Sammy Fain, Jack Yellen) – 2:42

The 1990 compact disc reissue included the ballad "After Supper"

== Personnel ==
- Tony Bennett – vocals
- Ralph Sharon – piano and arranger

The Count Basie Orchestra:

- Count Basie – piano
- Thad Jones, Snooky Young, Wendell Culley & Joe Newman – trumpet
- Benny Powell, Henry Coker & Al Grey – trombone
- Marshal Royal & Frank Wess – alto saxophone
- Frank Foster & Billy Mitchell – tenor saxophone
- Charlie Fowlkes – baritone saxophone
- Freddie Green – guitar
- Eddie Jones – bass
- Sonny Payne – drums
