= The Movie Song Album =

Studio album by Tony Bennett
- Released: January 31, 1966
- Recorded: September 26, 1965 (#7); December 14, 1965 (#2, 5, 11); CBS Studio A, Los Angeles; December 27, 1965 (#1, 8–9); December 28, 1965 (#3–4, 6); December 29, 1965 (#10, 12); CBS 30th Street Studio, New York City
- Genre: Vocal jazz
- Length: 37:04
- Label: Columbia; CL 2472; CS 9272
- Producer: Ernie Altschuler

Tony Bennett chronology
If I Ruled the World: Songs for the Jet Set (1965)	The Movie Song Album (1966)	A Time for Love (1966)

Singles from The Movie Song Album
- 1. "The Shadow of Your Smile" Released: October 18, 1965; 2. "Song From "The Oscar"" Released: January 17, 1966

The Movie Song Album is a 1966 studio album by Tony Bennett. The album consists of songs from films, opening with the theme from The Oscar, in which Bennett had recently appeared. With this project of such high quality of song material and collaborators, he was to describe the album in his autobiography as his "all time favorite record".

Johnny Mandel was the musical director, and he and Neal Hefti and Quincy Jones arranged and conducted their own compositions on the album. Luiz Bonfá played the guitar on his two songs, "Samba de Orfeu" and "The Gentle Rain". The pianists Tommy Flanagan, Jimmy Rowles and Lou Levy all collaborated, each on one song.

Two singles from the album, "The Shadow of Your Smile" debuted on the Billboard Hot 100 in the issue dated November 15, 1965, peaking at number 95 during its three-week stay. and number eight on the magazine's Easy Listening chart, during its 13-weeks there. "Maybe September", spent four weeks on the Billboard Bubbling Under Hot 100 Singles chart in the issue dated February 26, 1966, peaking at number 104. and number ten on the magazine's Easy Listening chart, during its ten-weeks there.

Bennett's recording of "The Shadow of Your Smile" won Mandel and Paul Francis Webster the Grammy Award for Song of the Year at the Grammy Awards of 1966, and Bennett performed the song at the 38th Academy Awards, where it won the Academy Award for Best Original Song.

The album debuted on the Billboard Top LPs chart in the issue dated March 12, 1966, and remained on the album chart for 29 weeks, peaking at No. 18. it also debuted on the Cashbox albums chart in the issue dated March 12, 1966, and remained on the chart for in a total of 23 weeks, peaking at No. 26.

On November 8, 2011, Sony Music Distribution included the CD in a box set entitled The Complete Collection.

== Reception ==
Professional ratings
Review scores
Source	Rating
AllMusic	4.5/5 stars
Record Mirror	4/5 stars

In a four-star rating on AllMusic, William Ruhlmann wrote "he devoted himself exclusively to movie themes, everything from 'The Trolley Song (Meet Me in St. Louis)' to 'Days of Wine and Roses'. Some of the tunes were not first-rate, but in 'The Shadow of Your Smile' and 'The Second Time Around', Bennett found material worthy of him.

Billboard described the album as "a guaranteed chartbusting LP", saying "Outstanding movie songs are given exceptional Bennett vocals" Cashbox believed "It is typical of Bennett to draw from the Hollywood scene a complete round-up of sensitive and winning songs."

Variety notes "Tony Bennett's vocalistic dramatics get a firstrate workout on this repertoire of songs drawn from films of various vintage." Record World reported that album showed Bennett "underscores his debut as a movie actor by doing a package of tunes from movies."

American Record Guide claims "The album is sensitively and forcefully sung and comes off very well."

Record Mirror said "it's tremendously warm, swinging, sentimental, sensitive", giving it a four-star rating. Disc and Music Echo said the album "turns his relaxed-but overrated-vocal talents."

== Track listing ==
1. "Maybe September" (from The Oscar) (Ray Evans, Percy Faith, Jay Livingston) – 4:03
2. "Girl Talk" (from Harlow) (Neal Hefti, Bobby Troup) – 3:14
3. "The Gentle Rain" (from The Gentle Rain) (Luiz Bonfá, Matt Dubey) – 2:12
4. "Emily" (from The Americanization of Emily) (Johnny Mandel, Johnny Mercer) – 3:25
5. "The Pawnbroker" (from The Pawnbroker) (Quincy Jones, Jack Lawrence) – 3:08
6. "Samba de Orfeu" (from Black Orpheus) (Bonfá) – 2:08
7. "The Shadow of Your Smile" (from The Sandpiper) (Mandel, Paul Francis Webster) – 3:38
8. "Smile" (from Modern Times) (Charlie Chaplin, Geoffrey Claremont Parsons, John Turner) – 3:34
9. "The Second Time Around" (from High Time) (Sammy Cahn, Jimmy Van Heusen) – 2:44
10. "Days of Wine and Roses" (from Days of Wine and Roses) (Henry Mancini, Mercer) – 2:58
11. "Never Too Late" (from Never Too Late) (Evans, Livingston, Rose) – 3:25
12. "The Trolley Song" (from Meet Me in St. Louis) (Ralph Blane, Hugh Martin) – 2:35

== Charts ==
Chart (1963)	Peak position
US Top LPs (Billboard)	18
US Cash Box	26

=== Singles ===
Year	Title	U.S. Hot 100	U.S. Cashbox	U.S. AC
1966	"The Shadow of Your Smile"	95	—	8
1966	"Maybe September"	104	135	10

== Personnel ==
- Tony Bennett – vocals
- Neal Hefti, Quincy Jones, Johnny Mandel, David Rose – arranger, conductor
- Larry Wilcox, Al Cohn – arranger
- Tommy Flanagan, Lou Levy, Jimmy Rowles – piano
- Luiz Bonfá – guitar
- Zoot Sims – tenor sax (on track 12)
