= The Good Things in Life =

Studio album by Tony Bennett
- Released: October 12, 1972
- Genre: Vocal jazz
- Label: Verve

Tony Bennett chronology
With Love (1972)	The Good Things in Life (1972)	Listen Easy (1973)

Professional ratings
Review scores
Source	Rating
The Encyclopedia of Popular Music	3/5 stars

The Good Things in Life is an album by Tony Bennett, released in 1972. The album debuted on the Billboard Top LPs chart in the issue dated December 9, 1972, and remained on the album chart for six weeks, peaking at No. 196. it also debuted on the Cashbox albums chart in the issue dated November 25, 1972, and remained on the chart for two weeks, peaking at 162. The back cover of the album features a painting by Mr Bennett of himself and conductor Robert Farnon.

On November 8, 2011, Sony Music Distribution included the CD in a box set entitled The Complete Collection.

== Track listing ==
1. "The Good Things in Life" – (Leslie Bricusse, Anthony Newley)
2. "'O sole mio" – (Eduardo di Capua, Giovanni Capurro, Alfredo Mazzucchi)
3. "Passing Strangers" – (Mel Mitchell, Rita Mann, Stanley Applebaum)
4. "End of a Love Affair" – (Edward C. Redding)
5. "Oh, Lady Be Good!" – (George Gershwin, Ira Gershwin).
6. "Blues for Breakfast" – (Jerry Gladstone, Matt Dennis)
7. "Mimi" – (Rodgers and Hart)
8. "Invitation" – (Bronisław Kaper, Paul Francis Webster)
9. Someone to Light Up My Life (Se Tudos Fossem Iguals a Voce) – (Antonio Carlos Jobim, Vinicius de Moraes)
10. "It Was You" – (Cy Coleman, James Lipton)
11. "Cute" – (Neal Hefti)
12. "The Midnight Sun" – (Lionel Hampton, Sonny Burke, Johnny Mercer)
13. "London By Night" – (Carroll Coates)
14. "The Good Things in Life (Closing)"

== Charts ==
Chart (1972–1973)	Peak position
US Top LPs (Billboard)	196
US Cash Box	162
