= A Swingin' Christmas =

Studio album by Tony Bennett featuring the Count Basie Big Band
- Released: October 14, 2008
- Recorded: June 2008
- Genre: traditional pop, jazz Christmas
- Length: 37:01
- Label: Columbia
- Producer: Phil Ramone

Tony Bennett chronology
Duets: An American Classic (2006)	A Swingin' Christmas (2008)	Duets II (2011)

Professional ratings
Review scores
Source	Rating
AllMusic	4/5 stars

A Swingin' Christmas is a Christmas album by Tony Bennett, released in 2008, that features the Count Basie Big Band. Bennett's daughter Antonia duets with him on one track. The album received a Grammy Award nomination for Best Traditional Pop Vocal Album at the 52nd Grammy Awards. The album cover parodies Norman Rockwell's 1942 painting, Freedom from Want.

On November 8, 2011, Sony Music Distribution included the CD in a box set entitled The Complete Collection.

== Marketing campaign ==
To promote the release of the album Bennett granted numerous interviews, and made a number of television show performances, from the time of its release through the holiday season. This included a special free street performance outside of Bloomingdale's department store at 4:30 p.m. on November 20 in New York City in which he performed three songs – "I'll Be Home for Christmas," "Santa Claus Is Coming to Town" and "Jingle Bells" – before the unveiling of the store's window displays. He performed a concert at New York City's Apollo Theater on December 16 that was billed as his only show in support of the album with the Count Basie Big Band.

== Track listing ==
1. "I'll Be Home for Christmas" (Gannon, Kent, Ram) [2:12]
2. "Silver Bells" (Evans, Livingston) [3:17]
3. "All I Want for Christmas Is You (A Christmas Love Song)" (Alan Bergman, Marilyn Bergman, Johnny Mandel) [4:18]
4. "My Favorite Things" (Oscar Hammerstein II, Richard Rodgers) [2:55]
5. "Christmas Time Is Here" (Guaraldi, Mendelson) [3:59]
6. "Winter Wonderland" (Bernard, Smith) [2:31]
7. "Have Yourself a Merry Little Christmas" (Blane, Martin) [4:36]
8. "Santa Claus Is Coming to Town" (Coots, Gillespie) [2:53]
9. "I've Got My Love to Keep Me Warm" – with Antonia Bennett (Berlin) [3:31]
10. "The Christmas Waltz" (Cahn, Styne) [3:22]
11. "O Christmas Tree" (Traditional) [3:27]

== Versions ==
Many retailers featured different variations:

- Target carried an edition featuring a bonus DVD with a documentary on the making of the album as well as a host of concert performances.
- FYE carried an edition featuring a bonus DVD with a documentary on the making of the album as well as a special holiday-themed postcard reproducing Bennett's artwork.
- Borders carried an edition with ten of Bennett's holiday-themed artwork postcards.
- Barnes & Noble carried an edition with Bennett's version of "Christmas Auld Lang Syne" exclusive to the retailer. B&N also carried a deluxe version with a DVD and the exclusive track.
- Bloomingdale's carried an edition with Bennett's version on "Jingle Bells", exclusive to the retailer.

== Personnel ==
- Tony Bennett – vocals
- Monty Alexander – piano
- Lee Musiker – piano (7, 9, 11)
- Gray Sargent – guitar
- Paul Langosch – double bass
- Harold Jones – drums

The Count Basie Orchestra

- Grant Langford – alto saxophone
- Marshall McDonald – alto saxophone
- Doug Lawrence – tenor saxophone
- Doug Miller – tenor saxophone
- John Williams – baritone saxophone
- Scotty Barnhart – trumpet
- Kris Johnson – trumpet
- Michael Williams – trumpet
- James Zollar – trumpet
- Clarence Banks – trombone
- Barry Cooper – trombone
- Dave Keim – trombone
- Alvin Walker – trombone

Production

- Danny Bennett – executive producer
- Phil Ramone – producer
- Dae Bennett – recording, mixing
- Alessandro Perrotta – assistant engineer
- Travis Stefl – assistant engineer
- Bob Ludwig – mastering

== Charts ==
=== Weekly charts ===
Chart (2008)	Peak position
US Billboard 200	28
US Top Jazz Albums (Billboard)	1

=== Year-end charts ===
Chart (2009)	Position
US Billboard 200	155
US Top Jazz Albums (Billboard)	4
