= A Time for Love (Tony Bennett album) =

Compilation album by Tony Bennett
- Released: August 29, 1966
- Recorded: 1960–66 in Los Angeles, London and New York City
- Genre: Vocal jazz
- Length: 35:27
- Label: Columbia
- Producer: Ernie Altschuler

Tony Bennett chronology
| The Movie Song Album (1966) | A Time for Love (1966) | Tony Makes It Happen (1967) |

Professional ratings
Review scores
| Source | Rating |
|---|---|
| AllMusic | 2/5 stars |

A Time for Love is a 1966 compilation album by Tony Bennett made of unreleased material recorded between 1960 and 1966.

The album debuted on the Billboard Top LPs chart in the issue dated October 8, 1966, and peaked at No. 68. It debuted on the Cash Box albums chart in the issue dated October 15, 1966, peaking at No. 39.

The single, "Georgia Rose", debuted on the Billboard Hot 100 in the issue dated July 23, 1966, peaking at number 89 during a four-week run. On the Easy Listening chart, it reached a peak of number six. and number 97 on the Cash Box singles chart. "A Time for Love" peaked at number 119 on the Billboard Bubbling Under Hot 100 Singles chart in September 1966 and number three on the Easy Listening chart.

On November 8, 2011, Sony Music Distribution included the album in a box set entitled The Complete Collection.

== Track listing ==
1. "A Time for Love" (Johnny Mandel, Paul Francis Webster) – 3:22
2. "The Very Thought of You" (Ray Noble) – 4:34
3. "Trapped in the Web of Love" (Jeanne Burns) – 3:20
4. "My Funny Valentine" (Richard Rodgers, Lorenz Hart) – 3:06
5. "In the Wee Small Hours of the Morning" (Bob Hilliard, David Mann) – 3:17
6. "Yesterdays" (Jerome Kern, Otto Harbach) – 3:02
7. "Georgia Rose" (Jimmy Flynn, Harry Rosenthal, Alex Sullivan) – 2:54
8. "The Shining Sea" (Mandel, Peggy Lee) – 2:50
9. "Sleepy Time Gal" (Richard A. Whiting, Raymond B. Egan, Joseph R. Alden, Ange Lorenzo) – 3:46
10. "Touch the Earth" (Jeri Southern) – 2:10
11. "I'll Only Miss Her When I Think of Her" (Sammy Cahn, Jimmy Van Heusen) – 3:06

== Personnel ==
- Tony Bennett – vocals
- Ralph Sharon Trio (tracks 4–6)
- Bobby Hackett – trumpet (tracks 2, 8, 9)
- Urbie Green – trombone (track 7)
- Johnny Keating – arranger and conductor (track 2); conductor (track 9)
- Johnny Mandel – arranger and conductor (tracks 1, 8, 11)
- Ralph Burns – arranger and conductor (tracks 7, 10)
- Ralph Sharon – arranger and conductor (track 3)
