= A Wonderful World (Tony Bennett and k.d. lang album) =

Studio album by Tony Bennett and k.d. lang
- Released: November 5, 2002
- Recorded: March 2002
- Studio: John Harms Theatre (remotely recorded to Bennett Studios)
- Genre: Jazz
- Label: Columbia
- Producer: T Bone Burnett, Danny Bennett

Tony Bennett chronology
The Essential Tony Bennett (2002)	A Wonderful World (2002)	The Art of Romance (2004)

k.d. lang chronology
Live by Request (2001)	A Wonderful World (2002)	Hymns of the 49th Parallel (2004)

Professional ratings
Review scores
Source	Rating
Allmusic	3.5/5 stars

A Wonderful World is an album by Tony Bennett and k.d. lang released in 2002.

It later won the Grammy Award for Best Traditional Pop Vocal Album. In the U.S., the album achieved gold record status, and reached top 40 in the UK.

On November 8, 2011, Sony Music Distribution included the CD in a box set entitled The Complete Collection.

== Track listing ==
1. "Exactly Like You" (Dorothy Fields, Jimmy McHugh) – 3:17
2. "La Vie en Rose" (Mack David, Louiguy, Edith Piaf) – 3:23
3. "I'm Confessin' (That I Love You)" (Doc Dougherty, Al J. Neiburg, Ellis Reynolds) – 4:46
4. "You Can Depend on Me" (Charles Carpenter, Carl M. Dunlap, Earl Hines) – 3:00
5. "What a Wonderful World" (Robert Thiele, George David Weiss) – 3:23
6. "That's My Home" (Otis Rene, Leon Rene) – 3:05
7. "A Kiss to Build a Dream On" (Oscar Hammerstein II, Bert Kalmar, Harry Ruby) – 3:25 (k.d. lang solo)
8. "I Wonder" (Cecil Gant, Raymond Leveen) – 3:49
9. "Dream a Little Dream of Me" (Fabian Andre, Gus Kahn, Wilbur Schwandt) – 3:52
10. "You Can't Lose a Broken Heart" (James P. Johnson, Eddie Miller) – 3:14
11. "That Lucky Old Sun (Just Rolls Around Heaven All Day)" (Haven Gillespie, Beasley Smith) – 4:36 (k.d. lang solo)
12. "If We Never Meet Again" (Louis Armstrong, Horace Gerlach) – 3:52

== Personnel ==
- Tony Bennett – vocals
- k.d. lang – vocals
- Lee Musiker – piano, arrangements
- Clayton Cameron – drums
- Paul Langosch – double bass
- Gray Sargent – guitar
- Scott Hamilton – tenor saxophone
- Peter Matz – conductor

== Charts ==
=== Weekly charts ===
Weekly chart performance for A Wonderful World by Tony Bennett and k.d. lang
Chart (2002–2003)	Peak position
Australian Albums (ARIA)	23
New Zealand Albums (RMNZ)	48
Portuguese Albums (AFP)	21
Scottish Albums (OCC)	35
UK Albums (OCC)	33
US Billboard 200	41
US Top Jazz Albums (Billboard)	2

=== Year-end charts ===
Year-end chart performance for A Wonderful World by Tony Bennett and k.d. lang
Chart (2002)	Position
Canadian Albums (Nielsen SoundScan)	158
Canadian Jazz Albums (Nielsen SoundScan)	5

Chart (2003)	Position
Australian Albums (ARIA)	53
US Billboard 200	193

== Certifications ==
Region	Certification	Certified units/sales
Australia (ARIA)	Platinum	70,000^{^}
Canada (Music Canada)	Gold	50,000^{^}
United States (RIAA)	Gold	500,000^{^}
^{^} Shipments figures based on certification alone.
