= Summer of '42 (Tony Bennett album) =

Studio album by Tony Bennett
- Released: January 12, 1972
- Genre: Vocal jazz
- Length: 32:39
- Label: Columbia; C 31219

Tony Bennett chronology
Love Story (1971)	Summer of '42 (1972)	With Love (1972)

Summer of '42 is a studio album by Tony Bennett, released on January 12, 1972, by Columbia Records. It was arranged by Torrie Zito, Robert Farnon, Marion Evans and Frank De Vol.

The album debuted on the Billboard Top LP's & Tapes chart in the issue dated February 19, 1972, and remained on the chart for four weeks, peaking at No. 182 It debuted on the Cash Box albums chart in the issue dated February 26, 1972, and remained on the chart for two weeks, peaking at number 150.

On November 8, 2011, Sony Music Distribution included the CD in a box set entitled The Complete Collection.

== Reception ==
Professional ratings
Review scores
Source	Rating
The Encyclopedia of Popular Music	2/5 stars

Billboard reviewed Summer of '42 upon its release and wrote that "Bennett comes up with a winner in this package of exceptional performances of some of today's best material".

Record World notes "The balance of the package, in its simplicity, is nicely old-fashioned." and "Tony sounds as good as he always does." referred to it as "Soothing"

Variety stated "Bennett is in fine voice, projection with dramatic intsensity on such songs as the 'Theme From Summer of '42', 'Walkabout', 'I'm Losing My Mind', 'Somewhere Along The Line', 'My Inamorata' and 'The Shining Sea'."

With production coming from multiple individuals for the album, Record Mirror said that the album showed "simply underlines the fervour with which Bennett propels worth-while lyrics." and believed "The phrasing is superb, the inter-pretation near-classic."

== Track listing ==
1. "Theme from Summer of '42 (The Summer Knows)" (Michel Legrand, Alan and Marilyn Bergman) – 3:34
2. "Walkabout" (John Barry, Don Black) – 2:38
3. "It Was Me" (Gilbert Bécaud, Norman Gimbel) – 3:04
4. "Losing My Mind" (Stephen Sondheim) – 2:50
5. "Till" (Charles Danvers, Carl Sigman) – 2:58
6. "Somewhere Along the Line" (Dinah Washington, Walter Merrick) – 3:00
7. "Coffee Break" (James Moody) – 2:10
8. "More and More" (Sacha Distel, R. I. Allen) – 3:04
9. "Irena" (Robert Farnon) – 2:44
10. "My Inamorata" – (John Williams, Johnny Mercer) 3:39
11. "The Shining Sea" (Johnny Mandel, Peggy Lee) – 2:48

== Charts ==
Chart (1972)	Peak position
US Top LPs (Billboard)	182
US Cash Box	150

== Personnel ==
- Tony Bennett – vocals
- Robert Farnon, Marion Evans, Robert Farnon, Frank De Vol, Torrie Zito – arrangers
