= Love Story (Tony Bennett album) =

Studio album by Tony Bennett
- Released: February 10, 1971
- Genre: Vocal jazz
- Labels: Columbia; C 30558
- Producers: Ernie Altschuler, Howard A. Roberts, Teo Macero

Tony Bennett chronology
Tony Bennett's "Something" (1970)	Love Story (1971)	Summer of '42 (1971)

Love Story is a studio album by Tony Bennett, released on February 10, 1971. The album was conducted and arranged by Dick Hyman, Marion Evans, Marty Manning, Ralph Burns and Torrie Zito.

The album debuted on the Billboard Top LPs chart in the issue dated March 6, 1971, and remained on the chart for 13 weeks, peaking at No. 67. it also debuted on the Cashbox albums chart in the issue dated March 27, 1971, and remained on the chart for eight weeks, peaking at 77

the single, "(Where Do I Begin?) Love Story" ,'" bubbled under" Billboard's Hot 100, for five weeks that began in the issue dated February 13, 1971, and peaked at number 114.

On November 8, 2011, Sony Music Distribution included the CD in a box set entitled The Complete Collection.

== Reception ==
Professional ratings
Review scores
Source	Rating
The Encyclopedia of Popular Music	3/5 stars

Billboard reviewed Love Story upon its release and wrote that "Bennett starts thing rolling smoothly here with a warm and sensitive 'Love Story' that hits the mark in taste and phrasing." It was given a three-star rating by The Encyclopedia of Popular Music .

== Track listing ==
1. "Love Story" (Carl Sigman, Francis Lai) – 3:12
2. "Tea for Two" (Vincent Youmans, Irving Caesar) – 2:54
3. "I Want to Be Happy" (Youmans, Caesar, Otto Harbach) 3:11
4. "Individual Thing" (Jule Styne, Bob Merrill) – 3:29
5. "I Do Not Know a Day I Did Not Love You" (Richard Rodgers, Martin Charnin) – 3:27
6. "They Can't Take That Away from Me" (George Gershwin, Ira Gershwin) – 2:47
7. "When Joanna Loved Me" (Robert Wells, Jack Segal) – 3:39
8. "Country Girl" (Robert Farnon) – 2:10
9. "The Gentle Rain" (Luiz Bonfa, Matt Dubey) – 3:41
10. "Soon It's Gonna Rain" (Tom Jones, Harvey Schmidt) – 3:41
11. "A Taste of Honey" (Ric Marlow, Bobby Scott) – 2:55
12. "I'll Begin Again" (Leslie Bricusse) – 3:48

== Charts ==
Chart (1971)	Peak position
US Top LPs (Billboard)	67
US Cash Box	77
