= The Beat of My Heart =

Studio album by Tony Bennett
- Released: December 1, 1957
- Recorded: June 27 – October 25, 1957
- Studio: CBS 30th Street (New York City)
- Genre: Jazz
- Length: 29:34 original LP; 44:34 CD reissue
- Label: Columbia; CL 1079
- Producer: Mitch Miller

Tony Bennett chronology
Tony (1957)	The Beat of My Heart (1957)	Long Ago and Far Away (1958)

Professional ratings
Review scores
Source	Rating
Allmusic	link

The Beat of My Heart is the fifth studio album by jazz singer Tony Bennett. For this Columbia album Tony Bennett had started working with English jazz pianist Ralph Sharon and together they devised this percussion influenced treatment and invited percussionists Chico Hamilton, Jo Jones, Billy Exiner, Art Blakey, Candido Camero and Sabu Martinez to take part; Ralph Sharon was arranger and conductor.

On November 8, 2011, Sony Music Distribution included the CD in a box set entitled The Complete Collection.

== Track listing ==
=== 1957 LP listing ===
Side one

1. "Let's Begin" (Otto Harbach, Jerome Kern) – 2:00
2. "Lullaby of Broadway" (Al Dubin, Harry Warren) – 2:24
3. "Let There Be Love" (Ian Grant, Lionel Rand) – 2:03
4. "Love for Sale" (Cole Porter) – 3:09
5. "Army Air Corps Song" (Robert Crawford) – 2:46
6. "Crazy Rhythm" (Irving Caesar, Roger Wolfe Kahn, Joseph Meyer) – 2:09

Side two

7. "The Beat of My Heart" (Johnny Burke, Harold Spina) – 2:24
8. "So Beats My Heart for You" (Pat Ballard, Charles E. Henderson, Tom Waring) – 2:49
9. "Blues in the Night" (Harold Arlen, Johnny Mercer) – 2:50
10. "Lazy Afternoon" (John Latouche, Jerome Moross) – 2:20
11. "Let's Face the Music and Dance" (Irving Berlin) – 2:47
12. "Just One of Those Things" (Cole Porter) – 2:03

Recorded on June 27 (#6–7, 10), October 14 (#1, 12), October 21 (#2, 5, 9) and October 25 (#3–4, 8, 11), 1957.

=== Bonus CD tracks ===
The 1996 compact disc re-release contained six bonus tracks, but omitted "Army Air Corps Song."

12. "It's So Peaceful in the Country" (Alec Wilder) – 2:44
13. "In Sandy's Eyes" (T. Borelli) – 2:42
14. "I Get a Kick Out of You" (Cole Porter) – 3:05
15. "You Go to My Head" (J. Fred Coots, Haven Gillespie) – 2:40
16. "I Only Have Eyes for You" (Al Dubin, Harry Warren) – 2:13
17. "Begin the Beguine" (Cole Porter) – 4:22

Recorded on June 27 (#12–13), October 14 (#14–15), October 21 (#17) and October 25 (#16), 1957.

The 2011 release of this album as part of the 73 disc "Complete Tony Bennett Collection" is the same as the 1996 CD but restores "Army Air Corps Song."

== Personnel ==
- Tony Bennett – vocals
- Ralph Sharon – arranger, conductor, piano
- Al Cohn – tenor saxophone
- Nat Adderley – trumpet
- Robert Alexander, Jim Dahl, Kai Winding – trombone
- Herbie Mann, Spencer Sinatra, William Slapin – flute
- Eddie Costa – vibes
- John Pisano – guitar
- Milt Hinton, Eddie Safranski – bass
- Art Blakey, Chico Hamilton, Jo Jones, Candido, Sabu, Billy Exiner – drums
