= Tony Sings the Great Hits of Today! =

Studio album by Tony Bennett
- Released: January 7, 1970
- Recorded: 1969
- Genre: Pop
- Labels: Columbia; CS 9980
- Producer: Wally Gold

Tony Bennett chronology
Love Story: 20 All-Time Great Recordings (1969)	Tony Sings the Great Hits of Today! (1970)	Tony Bennett's "Something" (1970)

Professional ratings
Review scores
Source	Rating
Allmusic	1/5 stars
The Encyclopedia of Popular Music	2/5 stars

Tony Sings the Great Hits of Today! is a 1970 album by American classic pop and jazz singer Tony Bennett. Recorded under pressure from Columbia Records for Bennett to produce more marketable material, it features attempts at songs by the Beatles and other contemporary artists along with a psychedelic art cover. Critics and Bennett himself have viewed the album as a career low.

On November 8, 2011, Sony Music Distribution included the CD in a box set entitled The Complete Collection.

== History ==
Columbia Records head Clive Davis saw Bennett's album sales steadily decreasing and decided that Bennett should record more contemporary material. Davis later wrote, "Musically, Tony was looking over his shoulder. His repertory was dated, and the public wasn't buying it." Similar pressure had been applied to singers such as Lena Horne, Barbra Streisand and Mel Tormé to record contemporary rock songs. Some artists of the time, such as Horne and Peggy Lee, welcomed the chance to try their hand at rock music, but Bennett did not.

Bennett later said: "I started planning the record by listening to as many current hits as I could stand. I mean some of the songs made me physically nauseous." Davis reported that Bennett vomited before the first recording session for the album. While many of the songwriters whose songs are interpreted on the album, such as Lennon and McCartney and Burt Bacharach and Hal David, are highly regarded in their own right, Bennett had no genuine feeling for their style.

Allmusic states that of all the songs Bennett attempted on Tony Sings the Great Hits of Today!, "Is That All There Is?" is the only one he seemed to show any enthusiasm for. Bennett's partly spoken take on the Beatles' "Eleanor Rigby" has garnered the most commentary, with music writer Will Friedwald saying that it was recited as if it were Thomas Gray's Elegy Written in a Country Churchyard and Time magazine describing it as "Shatneresque," referring to Star Trek actor William Shatner's infamous spoken word recordings of popular rock songs.

Columbia also tried to capitalize on current trends with the album cover, which is designed in the psychedelic art style of Peter Max. The cover's bell-bottom pants and psychedelic necktie have been noted as contributing to the overall garish appearance.

The album was released on January 7, 1970. Sales goals for the album were not met, and it peaked at only number 144 on the Billboard 200 albums chart. The passage of time has seemingly not improved views of the album; in the 2000s, Allmusic and Time magazine both referred to it as a disaster.

Years later, Bennett would still recall his dismay at Columbia's demand to perform contemporary material, comparing it to when his seamstress mother was forced to produce a cheap dress. The album also helped speed Bennett's departure from his label. He said: "I left Columbia Records for one reason: They were forcing me to sing contemporary songs and I just couldn't stand it. I actually regurgitated when I made that awful album—I got physically sick. ... If I really adore a song, I just get into the creative zone and try to get the definitive version of the song that would make the composer feel magnificent. Where he would say, 'That's what I was trying to convey.' And Columbia wouldn't let me do that anymore."

Bennett soon recovered from the album's artistic failure by returning to the Great American Songbook for his material. However, his commercial fortunes would not improve until he staged a comeback in the late 1980s and early 1990s by appealing to a younger audience without changing his music.

For many years, the album was out of print and was not issued on compact disc. However, it was included in 2011's Tony Bennett – The Complete Collection, a 73-CD box set. In a new look at the album, The Second Disc catalogue review site wrote: "Within three years of 1969's controversial Tony Sings the Great Hits of Today!, the album which made the singer physically ill, Bennett was off Columbia. (Even that album doesn’t seem too bad in context; as inappropriate as 'Little Green Apples' and especially a half-spoken, half-sung 'Eleanor Rigby' are, the singer does well by 'The Look of Love', 'Something', 'My Cherie Amour' and 'Live for Life')."

== Track listing ==
1. "MacArthur Park" (Jimmy Webb) – 3:22
2. "Something" (George Harrison) – 3:18
3. "The Look of Love" (Burt Bacharach, Hal David) – 2:49
4. "Here, There and Everywhere" (John Lennon, Paul McCartney) – 2:44
5. "Live for Life" (Norman Gimbel, Francis Lai) – 3:43
6. "Little Green Apples" (Bobby Russell) – 2:49
7. "Eleanor Rigby" (John Lennon, Paul McCartney) – 3:40
8. "My Chérie Amour" (Henry Cosby, Sylvia Moy, Stevie Wonder) – 3:50
9. "Is That All There Is?" (Jerry Leiber, Mike Stoller) – 3:25
10. "Here" (Gene Lees) – 3:36
11. "Sunrise, Sunset" (Jerry Bock, Sheldon Harnick) – 3:37

== Personnel ==
- Tony Bennett - vocals
- John Bunch - piano
