= Young and Warm and Wonderful =

Song
- Written: Hy Zaret
- Recorded: Tony Bennett
- Label: Columbia Records

"Young And Warm And Wonderful" is a popular song with music by Lou Singer and lyrics by Hy Zaret, published in 1958.

The best-known version of the song was a recording by Tony Bennett. This recording was released by Columbia Records as catalog number 41172. It reached the Billboard magazine charts on June 30, 1958, its only week on the chart. On the Disk Jockey chart, it charted at #23; on the Best Seller chart, at #42; on the composite chart of the top 100 songs, it reached #59.
