= How Do You Keep the Music Playing? =

1982 song by Michel Legrand

"How Do You Keep the Music Playing? (Short Version)"

Single by James Ingram and Patti Austin

from the album It's Your Night
- B-side: "How Do You Keep the Music Playing? (Long Version)"
- Released: April 1983
- Recorded: 1982
- Length: 4:00
- Label: Qwest
- Songwriters: Michel Legrand, Alan and Marilyn Bergman
- Producers: Quincy Jones and Johnny Mandel

"How Do You Keep the Music Playing?" is a song composed by Michel Legrand, with lyrics by Alan and Marilyn Bergman for the 1982 film Best Friends, where it was introduced by James Ingram and Patti Austin. The Austin/Ingram version became a single in 1983 and reached number 45 on the Billboard Hot 100 and number 5 on the Billboard Adult Contemporary chart. It was one of three songs with lyrics by Alan and Marilyn Bergman that were nominated for the Academy Award for Best Original Song at the 55th Academy Awards.
