= John Henry =

John Henry most commonly refers to:

- John Henry (folklore)

John Henry may also refer to:

== People ==
=== Artists and entertainers ===
- John Henry (actor) (1738–1794), Irish and early American actor
- Seán Ó hEinirí (1915–1998), known in English as John Henry, Irish storyteller and known monolingual speaker of the Irish language
- Don Marion Davis (1917–2020), American former child actor known as John Henry Jr.
- John Raymond Henry (1943–2022), American sculptor
- John Henry (born c. 1972), American vocalist in the band Darkest Hour
- John Henry, stage name of Norman Clapham (1879–1934), English comedian
- Jon Henri, a pseudonym used by American cartoonist Joe Simon

=== Politicians ===
- John Henry (Maryland politician) (1750–1798), U.S. senator from and governor of Maryland
- John Vernon Henry (1767–1829), American politician, New York State comptroller
- John Flournoy Henry (1793–1873), U.S. representative from Kentucky
- John Franklin Henry, Mississippi state representative from 1884 to 1885
- John Henry (Illinois politician) (1800–1882), U.S. representative from Illinois
- John Snowdon Henry (1824–1896), British politician from South-East Lancashire
- John Henry (Australian politician) (1834–1912), Tasmanian House of Assembly member and treasurer of Tasmania
- Jack Henry (Australian communist) (1904–1976)
- John Henry (Ontario politician) (born 1960), Canadian politician, mayor of Oshawa, Ontario
- John Henry (Cook Islands politician) (born c. 1959), Cook Islander politician

=== Sportsmen ===
- John Henry (outfielder/pitcher) (1863–1939), American baseball outfielder/pitcher
- John Henry (catcher) (1889–1941), American baseball catcher
- John Henry (footballer) (born 1971), Scottish footballer

=== Other people ===
- John Henry, Margrave of Moravia (1322–1375), also Count of Tyrol
- John Henry IV of Gorizia (1322–1338), Count of Gorizia
- John Joseph Henry (1758–1811), American Revolutionary War soldier
- John Henry (spy) (c. 1776 – 1853), British spy
- J. L. Henry (John Lane Henry, 1831–1907), Supreme Court of Texas judge
- John Henry (judge) (1932–2026), New Zealand jurist
- John Henry (toxicologist) (1939–2007), English toxicologist
- John Ruthell Henry (1951–2014), American serial killer
- John W. Henry (born 1949), American businessman and owner of sports teams
- John B. Henry Jr. (1916–2013), United States Air Force general

== In arts and entertainment ==
=== Fictional characters ===
- John Henry, character in the 2006 comic series The Transformers: Evolutions
- John Henry, character in the Terminator: The Sarah Connor Chronicles science-fiction TV series
- John Henry (DC Comics), alter ego of John Wilson, character in DC Comics
- Steel (John Henry Irons), character from DC Comics, more commonly known as the superhero Steel

=== Film ===
- John Henry (2000 film), a short film in the Disney's American Legends series
- John Henry (2020 film), a dramatic thriller film starring Terry Crews and Ludacris
- John Henry, a character in the 1963 film All the Way Home

=== Literature ===
- John Henry (novel), a 1931 novel by Roark Bradford
- John Henry, an American Legend, a 1971 children's book by Ezra Jack Keats
- John Henry (picture book), a 1994 children's picture book by Julius Lester

=== Music ===
- John Henry (album), a 1994 album by They Might Be Giants
- "John Henry" or "John Henry Blues", a song recorded by DeFord Bailey
- John Henry (musical), a 1940 Broadway musical based on the 1931 novel

== Other uses ==
- John Henry (horse) (1975–2007), American Thoroughbred race horse
- John Henry, an American brand of clothing, originated by Henry Grethel, now owned by Perry Ellis International
- SS John Henry, a Liberty ship

== See also ==
- John G. Hemry (born 1956), American author of military science fiction novels
- John Henryism, a psychological term for a type of coping behaviours, named after the folklore John Henry
- Jack Henry (disambiguation)
