= Tony Bennett at Carnegie Hall =

Album Live Concert by Tonny Bennet

Live album by Tony Bennett
- Released: July 23, 1962
- Recorded: June 9, 1962
- Venue: Carnegie Hall, New York City
- Genre: Vocal jazz, traditional pop
- Length: 63:32
- Label: Columbia
- Producer: Ernest Altschuler

Tony Bennett chronology
I Left My Heart in San Francisco (1962)	Tony Bennett at Carnegie Hall (1962)	I Wanna Be Around... (1963)

Tony Bennett at Carnegie Hall: Complete

Live album by Tony Bennett
- Released: October 14, 1997
- Recorded: June 9, 1962
- Venue: Carnegie Hall, New York City
- Genre: Vocal jazz, traditional pop
- Length: 1:46:02
- Label: Sony
- Producer: Ernest Altschuler

Professional ratings
Review scores
Source	Rating
Allmusic	4.5/5 stars

Tony Bennett at Carnegie Hall is a 1962 live album by Tony Bennett. The June 9th concert was directed by Arthur Penn and Gene Saks. Carnegie Hall had not featured a pop performer until April 23, 1961 when Judy Garland recorded her legendary concert.

The album debuted on the Billboard Top LPs chart in the issue dated October 13, of that year, and remained on the album chart for 19 weeks, peaking at No. 39 it also debuted on the Cashbox albums chart in the issue dated October 13, of that year, and remained on the chart for in a total of 12 weeks, peaking at 21

On November 8, 2011, Sony Music Distribution included the CD in a box set entitled The Complete Collection.

== Track listing ==
=== 1962 12" LP, Tony Bennett at Carnegie Hall ===
==== Side one ====
1. "Lullaby of Broadway" (Al Dubin, Harry Warren) – 2:10
2. "Just in Time" (Betty Comden, Adolph Green, Jule Styne) – 2:08
3. "All the Things You Are" (Oscar Hammerstein II, Jerome Kern) – 3:04
4. "Stranger in Paradise" (Alexander Borodin, Robert Wright, George Forrest) – 3:12
5. "Our Love Is Here to Stay" (George Gershwin, Ira Gershwin) – 2:09
6. "Climb Ev'ry Mountain" (Hammerstein, Richard Rodgers) – 2:09
7. "Ol' Man River" (Hammerstein, Kern) – 2:49

==== Side two ====
1. "It Amazes Me" (Cy Coleman, Carolyn Leigh) – 3:18
2. "Firefly" (Coleman, Leigh) – 1:03
3. "I Left My Heart in San Francisco" (George Cory, Douglas Cross) – 2:46
4. "How About You?" (Ralph Freed, Burton Lane) – 1:17
5. "April in Paris" (Vernon Duke, Yip Harburg) – 1:13
6. "(In My) Solitude" (Eddie DeLange, Duke Ellington, Irving Mills) – 3:29
7. "I'm Just a Lucky So-and-So" (Mack David, Ellington) – 2:29

==== Side three ====
1. "Always" (Irving Berlin) – 1:34
2. "Anything Goes" (Cole Porter) – 1:30
3. "Blue Velvet" (Lee Morris, Bernie Wayne) – 2:37
4. "Rags to Riches" (Richard Adler, Jerry Ross) – 1:08
5. "Because of You" (Arthur Hammerstein, Dudley Wilkinson) – 1:40
6. "What Good Does It Do" (Harold Arlen, Harburg) – 3:54
7. "Lost in the Stars" (Maxwell Anderson, Kurt Weill) – 3:29
8. "One for My Baby (And One More for the Road)" (Arlen, Johnny Mercer) – 2:24

==== Side four ====
1. "Lazy Afternoon" (John Latouche, Jerome Moross) – 2:43
2. "Sing You Sinners" (Sam Coslow, W. Frank Harling) – 1:30
3. "Love, Look Away" (O. Hammerstein, Rodgers) – 2:23
4. "Sometimes I'm Happy (Sometimes I'm Blue)" (Irving Caesar, Clifford Grey, Vincent Youmans) – 2:26
5. "My Heart Tells Me (Should I Believe My Heart?)" (Gordon, Warren) – 2:23
6. "De Glory Road" (Clement Wood, Jacques Wolfe) – 8:51

=== 1997 CD, Tony Bennett at Carnegie Hall: Complete ===
==== Disc one ====
1. Introduction/"Lullaby of Broadway" (Al Dubin, Harry Warren) – 2:20
2. "Just in Time" (Betty Comden, Adolph Green, Jule Styne) – 2:12
3. "All the Things You Are" (Oscar Hammerstein II, Jerome Kern) – 3:08
4. "Fascinating Rhythm" (George Gershwin, Ira Gershwin) – 1:21
5. "Stranger in Paradise" (Alexander Borodin, Robert Wright, George Forrest) – 3:18
6. "Our Love Is Here to Stay" (G. Gershwin, I. Gershwin) – 2:14
7. "Love Look Away" (Hammerstein, Rodgers) – 2:30
8. "Climb Ev'ry Mountain" (Hammerstein, Richard Rodgers) – 2:12
9. "Put on a Happy Face"/"Comes Once in a Lifetime" (Lee Adams, Charles Strouse)/(Comden, Green, Styne) – 2:09
10. "My Ship" (Kurt Weill, I. Gershwin) – 2:36
11. "Speak Low" (Weill, Ogden Nash) – 2:02
12. "Lost in the Stars" (Maxwell Anderson, Weill) – 3:34
13. "Always" (Irving Berlin) – 1:46
14. "Anything Goes" (Cole Porter) – 1:29
15. "Ol' Man River" (Hammerstein, Kern) – 2:59
16. "Lazy Afternoon" (John Latouche, Jerome Moross) – 2:34
17. "Sometimes I'm Happy (Sometimes I'm Blue)" (Irving Caesar, Clifford Grey, Vincent Youmans) – 2:28
18. "Have I Told You Lately?" (Harold Rome) – 3:02
19. "That Old Black Magic" (Harold Arlen, Johnny Mercer) – 1:25
20. "A Sleepin' Bee" (Arlen, Truman Capote) – 2:58
21. "I've Got the World on a String" (Arlen, Ted Koehler) – 3:03
22. "What Good Does It Do" (Arlen, Yip Harburg) – 3:56
23. "One for My Baby (And One More for the Road)" (Arlen, Mercer) – 2:33

==== Disc two ====
1. "This Could Be the Start of Something" (Steve Allen) – 1:35
2. "Without a Song" (Vincent Youmans, Billy Rose, Edward Eliscu) – 3:03
3. "Toot Toot Tootsie (Goodbye)" (Gus Kahn, Ernie Erdman, Dan Russo) – 2:01
4. "It Amazes Me" (Cy Coleman, Carolyn Leigh) – 3:02
5. "Rules of the Road" (Coleman, Leigh) – 2:25
6. "Firefly" (Coleman, Leigh) – 1:11
7. "The Best Is Yet to Come" (Coleman, Leigh) – 2:39
8. "I Left My Heart in San Francisco" (George Cory, Douglas Cross) – 2:55
9. "How About You?"/"April in Paris" (Ralph Freed, Burton Lane)/(Vernon Duke, Harburg) – 2:35
10. "Chicago (That Toddlin' Town)" (Fred Fisher) – 1:24
11. "(In My) Solitude" (Eddie DeLange, Duke Ellington, Irving Mills) – 3:36
12. "I'm Just a Lucky So-and-So" (Mack David, Ellington) – 2:36
13. "Taking a Chance on Love" (Vernon Duke, Ted Fetter, John La Touche) – 1:56
14. "My Heart Tells Me (Should I Believe My Heart?)" (Gordon, Warren) – 2:23
15. "Pennies from Heaven" (Arthur Johnston, Johnny Burke) – 2:17
16. "Rags to Riches" (Richard Adler, Jerry Ross) – 1:12
17. "Blue Velvet" (Lee Morris, Bernie Wayne) – 2:44
18. "Smile" (Charles Chaplin, Geoffrey Claremont Parsons, John Turner) – 1:23
19. "Because of You" (Arthur Hammerstein, Dudley Wilkinson) – 1:42
20. "Sing You Sinners" (Sam Coslow, W. Frank Harling) – 2:01
21. "De Glory Road" (Clement Wood, Jacques Wolfe) – 8:43

== Personnel ==
- Tony Bennett – vocals

Ralph Sharon orchestra:

- Ralph Sharon – piano
- Kenny Burrell – guitar
- Mel Davis, Bernie Glow, Al DeRisi, Nick Travis – trumpet
- Jack Lesburg – double bass
- Sy Berger, Frank Rehak – trombone
- Paul Faulise – bass trombone
- Sol Schlinger – bass clarinet, baritone saxophone
- Al Cohn – tenor saxophone
- Joe Soldo, Dick Meldonian – flute, alto saxophone
- Romeo Penque – flute, tenor saxophone
- Alfred Brown – viola
- Anthony Sophos – cello
- Bobby Rosengarden – percussion, bongos, conga, timbales, timpani
- Candido Camero – bongos, conga
- Eddie Costa – vibes
- Billy Exner – drums
