= Elzy =

Elzy is a surname and given name. Notable people with the name include:

== Surname ==
- Amanda Elzy (died 2004), American educator

- Amanda Elzy High School, school in Mississippi, United States, named in her honor

- Emma Elzy (1887 or 1888 - 1985), mother of Amanda and Ruby
- Erma Elzy, American television and theatre director
- Ruby Elzy (1908-1943), American singer

== Given name or nickname ==
- Elzy Burroughs (1771/77–1825), American stonemason, engineer, lighthouse builder and keeper
- Elzy Lay (1869-1934), American outlaw

== See also ==
- Elzy, a place near Wick, Caithness, Scotland
