= John Henry (novel) =

1931 novel by Roark Bradford

- Dust-jacket illustration for John Henry
- Author: Roark Bradford
- Illustrator: J. J. Lankes
- Language: English
- Genre: Novel
- Publisher: Harper & Brothers
- Publication date: 1931
- Publication place: United States
- Media type: Print (Hardback & Paperback)
- Pages: 225 pp

John Henry is a 1931 novel by Roark Bradford and illustrated by woodcut artist J. J. Lankes, based on the African-American folk hero of the same name. It was made into a Broadway play by Bradford and Jacques Wolfe in 1939 featuring Paul Robeson in the title role and Ruby Elzy as Julie Anne.

== See also ==
- John Henry (musical)
