= Disney's American Legends =

2002 American film

- Home video release cover
- Directed by: Lara Shapiro
- Written by: Shirley Pierce
- Produced by: Richard Kaylor
- Starring: Alfre Woodard; Geoffrey Jones; Tim Hodge; Thurl Ravenscroft; Dal McKennon; Dennis Day; Jerry Colonna; Ken Darby
- Narrated by: James Earl Jones
- Cinematography: Sergio Rodregez
- Edited by: Leland Gray; Adrian McKetch
- Production companies: Walt Disney Home Entertainment; Walt Disney Productions (Note: 1940s-1950s shorts); Walt Disney Feature Animation Florida (Note: John Henry)
- Distributed by: Buena Vista Home Entertainment
- Release date: February 12, 2002
- Running time: 58 minutes
- Country: United States

Disney's American Legends is a 2002 American animated anthology film narrated by James Earl Jones. A compilation of four previously released animated musical shorts from Walt Disney Animation Studios based on American tall tales, the collection includes The Brave Engineer (1950), Paul Bunyan (1958), John Henry (2000), and The Legend of Johnny Appleseed which is a segment from the 1948 film Melody Time.

The film's new short is based on John Henry and stars Alfre Woodard and Tim Hodge. John Henry was later released on Blu-ray in Walt Disney Animation Studios Short Films Collection on August 18, 2015.

== Content ==
=== John Henry (2000) ===
Based on the story of John Henry, a mighty railroad worker who raced against a steam drill.

- Production company: Walt Disney Feature Animation Florida
- Director: Mark Henn
- Producer: Steven Keller
- Writer: Broose Johnson, Tim Hodge, Shirley Pierce
- Music: Score by Stephen James Taylor, original songs by Gary Hines and Billy Steele and performed by Sounds of Blackness
- Art director: Robert Stanton

=== The Legend of Johnny Appleseed (1948) ===
Based on the story of Johnny Appleseed (voiced by Dennis Day), a nurseryman who introduced apple trees to Ohio and Indiana. The short was originally featured in the 1948 film Melody Time.

- Director: Wilfred Jackson
- Producer: Walt Disney
- Writer: Winston Hibler, Erdman Penner, Joe Rinaldi, Jesse Marsh
- Music: Paul J. Smith
- Art director: Mary Blair

=== Paul Bunyan (1958) ===
Based on the story of Paul Bunyan (voiced by Thurl Ravenscroft), a folklore giant lumberjack, and his blue-colored ox, Babe.

- Director: Les Clark
- Producer: Walt Disney
- Writer: Lance Nolley, Ted Berman
- Music: George Bruns
- Lyrics: Tom Adair
- Art director: Eyvind Earle

=== The Brave Engineer (1950) ===
Based on the exploits of railroad engineer Casey Jones.

- Director: Jack Kinney
- Producer: Walt Disney
- Writer: Dick Kinney, Dick Shaw
- Music: Ken Darby

== Reception ==
Mike Pinsky, of DVD Verdict, reviewed the compilation: "If, as James Earl Jones says in the finale, the message of this film is to 'look for the heroes around you and celebrate them', Disney's American Legends is an interesting, if half-hearted, attempt to carry out that advice." Kirby C. Holt of Toon Talk, commented: "Although the program definitely presents the shorts in descending order of quality, it ends on a high note with these inspirational words from James Earl Jones: "Look for the heroes around you and celebrate them ... you can find them in the past, in the present, even in the mirror".

== See also ==
- Tall Tale - a live-action film featuring Pecos Bill, Paul Bunyan, and John Henry.
