= Mr. Broadway =

Mr. Broadway may refer to:

- Mr. Broadway (TV series), an American adventure and drama television series
- Mr. Broadway (film), a 1933 American pre-Code comedy film
- Mr. Broadway: Tony's Greatest Broadway Hits, a 1962 album by Tony Bennett
