= This Is All I Ask (album) =

Studio album by Tony Bennett
- Released: July 23, 1963
- Recorded: April 22–26, 1963
- Studio: CBS 30th Street (New York City)
- Genre: Vocal jazz
- Length: 32:48
- Label: Columbia; CL 2056; CS 8856
- Producer: Ernie Altschuler

Tony Bennett chronology
I Wanna Be Around... (1963)	This Is All I Ask (1963)	The Many Moods of Tony (1964)

Singles from This Is All I Ask
- 1. "This Is All I Ask" Released: June 25, 1963; 2. "The Moment Of Truth" Released: November 26, 1963

This Is All I Ask is a Studio album by American Singer Tony Bennett, released on July 23, 1963, by Columbia Records. it was produced by Ernie Altschuler.

It features a mix of originals and covers of standards songs, it also featured the new version of This Is All I Ask. (which He previously recorded on Alone Together two years earlier in 1961).

The album debuted on the Billboard Top LPs chart in the issue dated August 24, 1963, and remained on the album chart for 30 weeks, peaking at number 24. it also debuted on the Cashbox albums chart in the issue dated August 17, 1963, and remained on the chart for in a total of 30 weeks, peaking at number 14.

Three singles from the album, "This Is All I Ask", debuted on the Billboard Hot 100 in the issue dated July 20, 1963, peaking at number 70 during its seven-weeks stay. and number 55 on the Cashbox singles chart during its eight-weeks stay. "True Blue Lou", debuted on the Billboard Hot 100 in the issue dated July 27, 1963, peaking at number 99 during its two-weeks stay. "The Moment of Truth", spent its sole week on the Billboard Bubbling Under Hot 100 Singles chart in the issue dated December 14, 1963, peaking at number 104.

On November 8, 2011, Sony Music Distribution included the CD in a box set entitled The Complete Collection.

== Reception ==
Professional ratings
Review scores
Source	Rating
AllMusic	3/5 stars
Record Mirror	4/5 stars
The Encyclopedia of Popular Music	3/5 stars
Disc	5/5 stars

William Ruhlmann of AllMusic said the album "showed Bennett turned to old standbys like Cy Coleman and Carolyn Leigh, pulling another song from their show Little Me, in this case "On The Other Side Of The Tracks", and included a drum track, "Tricks," with Chico Hamilton".

Billboard praised "Bennett for his best come on 'True Blue Lou' , 'On The Other Side of the Tracks' , 'Sandy's Smile', and 'Young and Foolish'.'

Cashbox wrote "Bennet "has gathered together an easy-listening set of ballads and rhythm tunes that are enhanced by the Bennett-styled delivery."

Variety notes "Bennett's vocal mood gets added musical highlights through maestro Ralph Burns' definitive downbeat."

Ralph Vaughan Williams of American Record Guide described the album as "another typical Tony Bennett album."

Record Mirror described the album as "an outstanding album"

Nigel Hunter of Disc stated that Bennett "turned [i]n a superb set of vocal artistry, with the quality of the songs maching the [...] of the artist is full manture."

== Track listing ==
1. "Keep Smiling at Trouble" (Buddy G. DeSylvia, Al Jolson, Lewis E. Gensler) – 2:08
2. "Autumn in Rome" (Sammy Cahn, Paul Weston, Alessandro Cicognini) – 2:19
3. "True Blue Lou" (Richard A. Whiting, Leo Robin, Sam Coslow) – 2:46
4. "The Way That I Feel" – 2:58
5. "This Is All I Ask" (Gordon Jenkins) – 3:17
6. "The Moment of Truth" (Tex Satterwhite, Frank Scott) – 2:14
7. "Got Her Off My Hands" – 2:04
8. "Sandy's Smile" – 3:13
9. "Long About Now" – 2:45
10. "Young and Foolish" – 3:26
11. "Tricks" – 1:52
12. "On the Other Side of the Tracks" (Cy Coleman, Carolyn Leigh) – 3:46

Recorded April 22, 1963 (#1–2, 10, 12), April 24, 1963 (#3, 6–7), April 26, 1963 (#4–5, 8–9, 11).

== Personnel ==
- Tony Bennett – vocals
- Ralph Sharon – piano
- Chico Hamilton – drums (#11)
- Ralph Burns – arranger, conductor
- Unidentified chorus and orchestra
