= I Wanna Be Around... =

Studio album by Tony Bennett
- Released: February 18, 1963
- Recorded: March 16, 1962–April 26, 1963
- Studio: CBS 30th Street (New York City)
- Genres: Traditional pop, vocal jazz
- Length: 27:21 original LP; 44:39 CD reissue
- Labels: Columbia; CL 2000; CS 8800
- Producer: Ernie Altschuler

Tony Bennett chronology
Tony Bennett at Carnegie Hall (1962)	I Wanna Be Around... (1963)	This Is All I Ask (1963)

Singles from I Wanna Be Around...
- 1. "I Wanna Be Around" Released: November 16, 1962; 2. "The Good Life" Released: April 19, 1963

I Wanna Be Around... is the fourteenth studio album by American singer Tony Bennett. released on February 18, 1963 by Columbia Records, it was produced by Ernie Altschuler.

The album debuted on the Billboard Top LPs chart in the issue dated April 6, 1963, and remained on the album chart for 44 weeks, peaking at number five. it also debuted on the Cashbox albums chart in the issue dated March 16, 1963, and remained on the chart for in a total of 63 weeks, peaking at number two.

Two singles from the album, "I Wanna Be Around" debuted on the Billboard Hot 100 in the issue dated January 12, 1963, peaking at number 14 during its 16-week run. number five on the magazine's Easy Listening chart, during its 16-weeks there. and number 15 on the Cashbox singles chart during its 16 weeks there. "The Good Life", debuted on the Billboard Hot 100 in the issue dated May 11, 1963, peaking at number 14 during its 16-week run. number seven on the magazine's Easy Listening chart, during its ten-weeks there. number 25 on the Cashbox singles chart during its eleven weeks there. and number 27 in the UK during a 13-week stay.

The album was released on compact disc by Columbia Records in 1995 as tracks 13 through 24 on a pairing of two albums on one CD with tracks 1 through 12 consisting of Bennett's 1962 breakthrough studio album, I Left My Heart in San Francisco. On November 8, 2011, Sony Music Distribution included the CD in a box set entitled The Complete Collection.

== Reception ==
Professional ratings
Review scores
Source	Rating
AllMusic	4.5/5 stars
The Encyclopedia of Popular Music	4/5 stars
Record Mirror	4/5 stars

Billboard mentions "He sings 'em all with the great heart ad warmth"

Cashbox felt there are "some expressive and feelingful Bennett readings of a host of choice new and old tunes with some pulsating backing by the Ralph Sharon Trio."

Variety notes "Bennett gives each song substance with his dramatic balladeering helped on occasion by The Ralph Sharon Trio and always by the orch and arranging supplied by Mark Manning"

American Record Guide said the album showed "Bennett remains the reliable Bennett [...] "Expect to mention that he does well with "I've Got Your Number, which may have been written for him.

William Ruhlmann of AllMusic said "there were also some excellent arrangements, including a percussion-and-flute reading of "Let's Face the Music and Dance" that echoed the Beat of My Heart album and a nod to the South American trend with Antonio Carlos Jobim's "Quiet Nights (Corcovado)."

It was given a four-star rating by both Record Mirror, and The Encyclopedia of Popular Music as well, the latter's rating meaning they believed the album was "outstanding" while getting a four/half-star rating from AllMusic.

== Track listing ==
1. "The Good Life" (Sacha Distel, Jack Reardon) – 2:15
2. "If I Love Again" (Jack Murray, Ben Oakland) – 3:19
3. "I Wanna Be Around" (Johnny Mercer, Sadie Vimmerstadt) – 2:11
4. "I've Got Your Number" (Cy Coleman, Carolyn Leigh) – 1:45
5. "Until I Met You" (Freddie Green, Don Wolf) – 2:57
6. "Let's Face the Music and Dance" (Irving Berlin) – 2:52 (omitted on CD reissue)
7. "Once Upon a Summertime" (Eddie Barclay, Michel Legrand, Eddy Marnay, Mercer) – 2:00
8. "If You Were Mine" (Matty Malneck, Mercer) – 2:15
9. "I Will Live My Life for You" (Henri Salvador, Marcel Stellman) – 2:26
10. "Someone to Love" (Harry Warren) – 1:58
11. "It Was Me" (Gilbert Becaud, Norman Gimbel) – 3:04
12. "Quiet Nights of Quiet Stars (Corcovado)" (Antônio Carlos Jobim, Gene Lees) – 3:16

Bonus tracks on CD reissue (all taken from the album "This Is All I Ask"):

12. "Autumn in Rome" (Sammy Cahn, Alessandro Cicognini, Paul Weston) – 2:15
13. "The Way That I Feel" (Harry Brooks) – 2:55
14. "The Moment of Truth" (Tex Satterwhite, Frank Scott) – 2:14
15. "Got Her Off My Hands (But Can't Get Her Off My Mind)" (Sam M. Lewis, Flip Phillips, Joe Young) – 2:00
16. "Long About Now" (Fred Hellerman, Fran Minkoff) – 2:44
17. "Young and Foolish" (Albert Hague, Arnold B. Horwitt) – 3:22
18. "Tricks" (Alan Brandt, Bob Haymes) – 1:48

Recorded March 16, 1962 (#5), October 19, 1962 (#2–4, 6–9), December 19, 1962 (#1, 10–11), April 22, 1963 (#12, 17), April 24, 1963 (#14–15), April 26, 1963 (#13, 16, 18)

== Charts ==
Chart (1963)	Peak position
US Top LPs (Billboard)	5
US Cash Box	2

=== Singles ===
Year	Title	U.S. Hot 100	U.S. Cashbox	U.S. AC	UK singles
1962	"I Wanna Be Around"	14	15	5	-
1963	"The Good Life"	14	25	9	27

== Personnel ==
- Tony Bennett – vocals
- Ralph Sharon – piano
- Ralph Burns – arranger
- Marty Manning – arranger, conductor
- Carlos Lyra - guitar (#11)
