= My Heart Sings (Tony Bennett album) =

Studio album by Tony Bennett
- Released: September 1, 1961
- Recorded: April 4–6, 1961
- Studio: CBS 30th Street (New York City)
- Genre: Vocal jazz
- Length: 34:20
- Label: Columbia; CL 1658; CS 8458

Tony Bennett chronology
Sings a String of Harold Arlen (1961)	My Heart Sings (1961)	Mr. Broadway: Tony's Greatest Broadway Hits (1962)

Professional ratings
Review scores
Source	Rating
New Record Mirror	3/5

My Heart Sings is an album by American singer Tony Bennett. It was recorded in 1961 and released the same year on Columbia as CL 1658. So far, it has been released on CD only in Japan by Sony/CBS.

On November 8, 2011, Sony Music Distribution included the CD in a box set entitled The Complete Collection.

== Track listing ==
1. "Don't Worry 'Bout Me" (Rube Bloom, Ted Koehler) – 3:00
2. "Dancing in the Dark" (Arthur Schwartz, Howard Dietz) – 2:32
3. "I'm Coming Virginia" (Will Cook, Donald Heywood) – 2:58
4. "(All of a Sudden) My Heart Sings" (Harold Rome, Jean Marie Blanvillain, Henry Herpin) – 3:16
5. "It Never Was You" (Kurt Weill, Maxwell Anderson) – 3:04
6. "You Took Advantage of Me" (Richard Rodgers, Lorenz Hart) – 2:25
7. "Close Your Eyes" (Bernice Petkere) – 2:20
8. "Stella by Starlight" (Ned Washington, Victor Young) – 2:26
9. "More Than You Know" (Billy Rose, Vincent Youmans, Edward Eliscu) – 3:40
10. "My Ship" (Ira Gershwin, Weill) – 3:10
11. "Lover Man" (Roger Ramirez, Jimmy Davis, Jimmy Sherman) – 3:35
12. "Toot, Toot, Tootsie! (Goodbye)" (Ted Fiorito, Ernie Erdman, Dan Russo, Gus Kahn) – 1:54

Recorded on April 4 (#1, 3–4, 6, 9, 11), April 5 (#7, 12) and April 6 (#2, 5, 8, 10), 1961.

== Personnel ==
- Tony Bennett – vocals
- Ralph Burns – conductor, arranger
- Bernie Leighton – piano
- Danny Bank, Al Klink, Ed Caine (#2, 5, 8, 10), Toots Mondello, Zoot Sims (#7, 12), Romeo Penque, Jerry Sanfino (#1, 3–4, 6–7, 9, 11–12) – saxophones
- Bernie Glow, Irving Markowitz, Jimmy Maxwell, Carl 'Doc' Severinsen – trumpets
- Robert Alexander, Urbie Green, Wayne Andre (#7, 12), William Elton (#7, 12), Dick Hixson, Frank Rehak – trombone
- Barry Galbraith, Chuck Wayne, Mundell Lowe (#7, 12) – guitar
- Milt Hinton – bass
- Eddie Costa – vibes (#2, 5, 8, 10)
- Herbie Lovelle – drums
