= The Good Life (1962 song) =

- Dutch release picture sleeve

Single by Tony Bennett

from the album I Wanna Be Around...
- B-side: "Spring in Manhattan"
- Released: April 1963
- Recorded: December 19, 1962
- Studio: Columbia 30th Street Studio, New York City
- Genre: Jazz
- Length: 2:14
- Label: Columbia
- Songwriter(s): Sacha Distel; Jack Reardon (English lyrics)
- Producer(s): Ernest Altschuler

Tony Bennett singles chronology
"I Wanna Be Around" (1962)	"The Good Life" (1963)	"True Blue Lou" (1963)

"The Good Life" (originally "La Belle Vie" in French) is a song by Sacha Distel with French lyrics by Jean Broussolle, published in 1962. It was featured in the film The Seven Deadly Sins.

== Background ==
In December 1961, Sacha Distel together with his ensemble first recorded the instrumental titled "Marina", which was released in early 1962. Later the same year, an English version with lyrics by Jack Reardon titled "The Good Life" was first recorded by Betty Carter, and then by Tony Bennett, whose version became the most popular version of the song. Bennett's version was the first to be released in early 1963, followed by Carter's version on her album 'Round Midnight. Prior to "The Good Life", Distel had released a vocal version of "Marina" with French lyrics by Jean Broussolle, titled "La Belle Vie".

== Tony Bennett recording ==
The song is best known in the English-speaking world via a 1963 recording by Tony Bennett with English lyrics by Jack Reardon. In the US, it was a number 18 hit on the U.S. pop singles chart, and number 7 on the Middle-Road Singles chart. Outside the US, "The Good Life" rose to number 27 on the UK Singles Chart. "The Good Life" became one of Bennett's staple songs, and was featured on four of his top-selling albums, including 1994's MTV Unplugged: Tony Bennett and 2006's Duets: An American Classic, the latter featuring Billy Joel. Bennett also named his 1998 autobiography after the song. He continued to perform the song live and did so at his final concerts, at Radio City Music Hall, aged 95.

=== Chart performance ===
Chart (1963)	Peak position
UK Singles (Official Charts Company)	27
US Billboard Easy Listening	7
US Billboard Hot 100	18

== Other versions ==
- Billy Eckstine recorded the song on his album Now Singing in 12 Great Movies that was arranged by Billy Byers, conducted by Bobby Tucker, and produced by Quincy Jones.
- A version recorded by Tony Orlando was subsequently released on Bell Records.
- In 1973, the song was released by Julius La Rosa as a 7" single, with "Save Me a Song" on its B-side, on the RCA Victor label. It became a hit at Metromedia radio station WNEW, AM 1130 in New York City, where La Rosa was a disc jockey, playing his own song. This version of the song had slightly altered lyrics. Uniquely arranged and conducted by Hal Massimino, the biggest change was in the main lyric, where "goodbye" was replaced with "hello".
- The Drifters (1965)
- Ann-Margret - Songs from The Swinger (And Other Swingin' Songs) (1966)
- Sacha Distel and Dionne Warwick (2004)

== In popular culture ==
- The Tony Orlando recording was used as the theme song of the short-lived sitcom of the same name, starring Larry Hagman.
- The Tony Bennett recording was used in TV commercials for American Airlines around 1972-1973, and also features in the 1988 British feature film Buster, about the criminals responsible for the 1963 Great Train Robbery in Buckinghamshire.
- In 1991, a version of the song, sung by Ray Charles, appeared in the film Nothing but Trouble, starring Chevy Chase, Demi Moore, Dan Aykroyd and John Candy. Charles' version was subsequently released on the film's soundtrack in 1991 through Warner Bros. Records.
- "The Good Life" was the theme song of the 2000 British gangster film, Gangster No. 1.
- The song was also employed as a 2007 jingle for a line of pet foods of the same name.
- A Julie London rendition was used by British Airways in its 2008 promotion of the new London Heathrow Terminal 5 facility.
- A rendition by the Divine Comedy was used in a 2022 advert for Magnum ice cream.

== Certifications ==
Region	Certification	Certified units/sales
United States (RIAA)	Gold	500,000^{‡}
^{‡} Sales+streaming figures based on certification alone.
