= Jack Henry =

Jack Henry may refer to:

- Jack Henry (industrialist) (1917–2003), New Zealand industrialist
- Jack Henry (American football, born 1926) (1926–2018), American football player and coach
- Jack Henry (footballer, born 1998), Australian rules footballer
- Jack Henry (Australian communist) (1904–1976)
- Jack Henry, co-founder of Jack Henry & Associates, an American information technology company, in 1976

== See also ==
- John Henry (disambiguation)
