= I Left My Heart in San Francisco (album) =

Studio album by Tony Bennett
- Released: June 18, 1962
- Recorded: October 1957–January 1962
- Studio: CBS 30th Street (New York City)
- Genre: Classic pop
- Length: 32:20
- Labels: Columbia; CL 1869; CS 8669
- Producer: Ernie Altschuler

Tony Bennett chronology
Mr. Broadway: Tony's Greatest Broadway Hits (1962)	I Left My Heart in San Francisco (1962)	Tony Bennett at Carnegie Hall (1962)

Singles from I Left My Heart in San Francisco
- 1. "Smile" Released: July 7, 1961; 2. "The Best Is Yet to Come" Released: February 27, 1961; 3. "Tender Is the Night" Released: October 20, 1961; 4. "I Left My Heart in San Francisco" Released: February 2, 1962; 5. "Candy Kisses" Released: March 30, 1962

I Left My Heart in San Francisco is an album by American singer Tony Bennett, released in 1962 on Columbia Records. The album debuted on the Billboard Top LPs chart in the issue dated October 13, 1962, and remained on the album chart for 149 weeks, peaking at number five. it also debuted on the Cashbox albums chart in the issue dated July 14, 1962, and remained on the chart for in a total of 184 weeks, peaking at number three. It entered the UK album chart on May 29, 1965, reaching number 13 over the course of 14 weeks. and has been certified platinum by the RIAA. Originally available as Columbia rekey CL 1869 (mono) and CS 8669 (stereo), it is one of the best-selling albums of Bennett's career.

Tony Bennett won two 1962 Grammy Awards for the title song: Record of the Year and Best Solo Vocal Performance, Male.

The album was released on compact disc by Columbia Records in 1995 as tracks 1 through 12 on a pairing of two albums on one CD with tracks 13 through 24 consisting of Bennett's 1963 album, I Wanna Be Around...

On November 8, 2011, Sony Music Distribution included the CD in a box set entitled The Complete Collection.

== Content ==
In February 1962, the song "I Left My Heart in San Francisco" was released by Columbia as the B-side to "Once Upon a Time", but became a chart hit in its own right. Columbia assembled the album around the single, including material that had been previously released on singles and unused items from earlier sessions.

Previously released songs included "The Best Is Yet to Come", which had been introduced by Bennett and released as Columbia single 41965 in February 1961, with "Marry Young" on the flipside. Both songs were by the team of Cy Coleman and Carolyn Leigh, their "Rules of the Road" the b-side to Columbia 42135 "Close Your Eyes" released August 11, 1961. Another single, "Candy Kisses" recorded in March 1961 with "Have I Told You Lately?" from I Can Get It for You Wholesale recorded at the same January 23, 1962 sessions that yielded the title song, were Columbia 42395 on March 30, 1962. "Tender Is the Night", later used in the 1962 film, had been Columbia 42219, released October 27, 1961, while Charlie Chaplin's "Smile" from Modern Times peaked at #73 on the Billboard Hot 100 as Columbia 41434, released July 6, 1959. None of the other singles, with the exception of "San Francisco", had charted.

The additional three tracks were taken from sessions spanning 1957 to 1960. "Taking a Chance on Love" derived from the musical Cabin in the Sky, "Love for Sale" from The New Yorkers, and "I'm Always Chasing Rainbows" from Oh, Look!. Bennett's rescue of "Once Upon a Time" from All American gave him "San Francisco" instead, his signature song.

== Reception ==
Professional ratings
Review scores
Source	Rating
AllMusic	5/5 stars
Record Mirror	4/5 stars
The Encyclopedia of Popular Music	4/5 stars
Disc	5/5 stars

William Ruhlmann of AllMusic said the album showed "they found the key, not only by happening across a signature song in the title track, but also in the approach to songs like "Once Upon a Time," a gem from the flop musical All American, and Cy Coleman and Carolyn Leigh's "The Best Is Yet to Come," which Bennett helped make a standard.

Billboard described the album as "one of Bennett's most salable albums, noted "it's teamed with a flock of outstanding tunes, both from Broadway as well as non-show sources. Cashbox described the album as "a powerful LP" and notes "Bennett is in the top voice as he reads from Broadway catalog and from a variety-spiced set of lyrical tunes". Variety notes "Bennett reprises such others of his previous single outings as "Once Upon A Time", "Tender is The Night", "Have I Told You Lately" and "Smile" with a vocal punch that embarked for top programming play."Nigel Hunter of Disc stated the set "contains superb songs, ranging between softly sentimental ballads like the title track and smoothly controlled swingers." Record Mirror praised Bennett "for his superb handling of the title song."

== Track listing ==
=== Side one ===
No.	Title	Writer(s)	Length
1.	"I Left My Heart in San Francisco"	Douglass Cross, George Cory	2:52
2.	"Once Upon a Time"	Charles Strouse, Lee Adams	2:57
3.	"Tender Is the Night"	Sammy Fain, Paul Francis Webster	2:38
4.	"Smile"	Charlie Chaplin, Geoffrey Parsons, John Turner	2:49
5.	"Love for Sale"	Cole Porter	3:09
6.	"Taking a Chance on Love"	Vernon Duke, Ted Fetter, John Latouche	1:54

=== Side two ===
No.	Title	Writer(s)	Length
1.	"Candy Kisses"	George Morgan	2:25
2.	"Have I Told You Lately?"	Harold Rome	2:39
3.	"Rules of the Road"	Cy Coleman, Carolyn Leigh	2:42
4.	"Marry Young"	Coleman, Leigh	2:20
5.	"I'm Always Chasing Rainbows"	Harry Carroll, Joseph McCarthy	2:40
6.	"The Best Is Yet to Come"	Coleman, Leigh	2:28

== Charts ==
Chart (1962)	Peak position
US Top LPs (Billboard)	5
US Cash Box	3
UK Albums Chart	13

=== Singles ===
Year	Title	U.S. Hot 100	U.S. Cashbox	U.S. AC	UK singles
1962	"I Left My Heart in San Francisco"	19	22	7	25

== Certifications ==
Certifications for I Left My Heart in San Francisco
Region	Certification	Certified units/sales
United States (RIAA)	Platinum	1,000,000^{‡}
^{‡} Sales+streaming figures based on certification alone.

== Personnel ==
- Tony Bennett — vocals
- Ralph Sharon — piano; arrangements on "Love for Sale"
- The Count Basie Orchestra — instruments and arrangements on "Taking A Chance on Love"
- Marty Manning — arrangements on "San Francisco," "Once Upon A Time," "Tender is the Night," "Candy Kisses," and "Have I Told You Lately?"
- Cy Coleman — arrangements on "Marry Young" and "The Best Is Yet to Come"
- Ralph Burns — arrangements on "Smile" and "Rules of the Road"
- Frank De Vol — arrangements on "I'm Always Chasing Rainbows"
- Candido Camero, Sabu Martinez, and Billy Exiner — percussion on "Love for Sale"
