= Ole Pete =

Folk legend of Port Tampa, Florida

Henry "Ole Pete" Peterson is a heroic Tampanian folk legend from Port Tampa, Florida, in the United States. He is considered by some to be the "John Henry" of Florida, with some sources saying that stories about Peterson pre-date those about Henry.

== Legend ==
Henry Peterson, known locally as "Ole Pete", was said to be either a roustabout, switchman or longshoreman employed by the Atlantic Coast Line Railroad in Port Tampa, Florida.

According to the legend, Ole Pete was the strongest man in all of Florida, with the power of a black bear and agility of a panther. He was known to crack coconuts with his bare hands for the children of Port Tampa, and for 50 cents he would engage a bull in a headbutt contest.

One story tells how Ole Pete was taking a break in a railcar repair shed, his head resting on the tracks. Suddenly a switch engine pushed two rail cars into the shed where Ole Pete was resting. The first rail car in the shed ran over Ole Pete, causing it to derail. When workers rushed to his aid they witnessed him lifting the rail car back onto the tracks, to their astonishment not only was Ole Pete unharmed, but he was still half asleep. When the workers asked if he was alright, Ole Pete simply said, "My head feels kinda funny."

Other powerful feats attached to Ole Pete include the use of a ship's anchor for a pickaxe and lifting a locomotive back on the rails. He is also reported to have uprooted a large tree, brought it home, and chopped it into four cords of firewood.

Some sources say that Peterson died in 1934 at the age of 67. A Henry Peterson, 46 years old, black, male, appears on the 1910 United States Census for Hillsborough County, Florida.
