= Johnny Appleseed (film) =

1948 segment from Disney's Melody Time directed by Wilfred Jackson

The Legend of Johnny Appleseed
- Johnny Appleseed in Disney's American Legends
- Directed by: Wilfred Jackson
- Story by: Winston Hibler; Joe Rinaldi; Erdman Penner; Jesse Marsh
- Produced by: Walt Disney
- Starring: Dennis Day
- Music by: Paul J. Smith; Joseph S. Dubin (orchestration)
- Animation by: Milt Kahl; Eric Larson; Don Lusk; Ollie Johnston; Hal Ambro; Harvey Toombs; George Rowley (effects)
- Layouts by: McLaren Stewart; Don DaGradi; Thor Putnam
- Backgrounds by: Claude Coats; Brice Mack
- Production company: Walt Disney Productions
- Distributed by: RKO Radio Pictures
- Release dates: May 27, 1948 (original, as a segment of Melody Time); December 25, 1955 (re-released, as a stand-alone short film)
- Running time: 17/19 minutes
- Country: United States
- Language: English

The Legend of Johnny Appleseed is an animated short musical segment from Walt Disney's 1948 film Melody Time. It is narrated by Dennis Day and is based on the American frontiersman John Chapman, better known as Johnny Appleseed. It is also included on the 2002 direct to video, VHS, and DVD release of Disney's American Legends.

== Plot ==
In 1806, young Pittsburgh farmer Johnny tends his apple orchard and happily sings a tune "The Lord Is Good to Me", thankful for his comfortable life. However, he wistfully watches as pioneers depart out west to the American frontier and wishes that he could follow, but doesn’t know how to survive in the unknown wild. A personal angel appears to Johnny (looking more like a wise pioneer than a traditional angelic figure) and inspires him to abandon his farm, go west, and plant apple seeds everywhere he goes so that settlers will always have something to eat during their travels. A reluctant Johnny tells the angel he'd like to go, but doesn't have the gear or equipment. The angel tells Johnny that he has all that he needs to go out West: a bag of apple seeds for planting, the Bible to read, and a tin pot he can use for a hat as well as cook with. Convinced, and with purpose, Johnny dutifully sets out all on his own into the untamed wilderness.

Shortly into his travels west, while wandering the dark and treacherous land alone, Johnny finds a bare plot of land to start an apple orchard. The wild animals of the woods are wary of him, afraid to approach thinking he means to hunt them like other pioneers. Yet while planting his seeds, Johnny kindly befriends a skunk to the surprise and relief of the other animals, and thereafter, all animals instinctively trust him.

After many years of planting apple trees all around the frontier, Johnny's earned the moniker Johnny Appleseed. Many of the now grown trees become a boon to the other pioneers just as the angel predicted. The harvested apples help the budding communities thrive and expand. Johnny, now older and wearing worn clothing along with a beard, but still sporting his iconic tin pot hat, pauses his travels to watch a pioneer festival. The local folks sing, dance, and play games with the apples, and finally have a huge feast with many dishes made using apples. Johnny is happy to see his trees bringing joy and good fortune, but quickly moves along followed by his animal companions.

In the end, after walking hundreds of miles and planting thousands of apple trees all along the way, an elderly Johnny finally rests for the last time under a tree. His angel appears again before him, and tells Johnny that it is time to go. Johnny's spirit gets up instead of his body, scared at first upon realizing he has passed away. Fear quickly turns into frustration as Johnny's spirit is reluctant to go to his final resting place, believing that his work is not done yet on Earth. However, the angel lovingly tells him that, where they are headed, they are low on apple trees. Hearing this, Johnny excitedly picks up his seed bag and happily agrees to go with him, singing together on the way.

The narrator finishes by saying that he always thinks of Johnny Appleseed whenever he looks up because the clouds in the sky are not really clouds at all: "They're apple blossoms, if you please, from John's heavenly orchard of apple trees".

== Songs ==
- "The Lord is Good to Me"
- "Get on the Wagon Rolling West" (Pioneers song)
- "The Apple Song (There's a Lot of Work To Do)"
- "Apple Feast"
- "The Apple Song (There's a Lot of Work To Do)" (Reprise)

== Cast ==
- Dennis Day - Narrator, The Old Settler, Johnny Appleseed, Johnny's Angel

=== Uncredited ===
- Jimmy MacDonald - Additional voices
- The Rhythmaires - Vocals, Additional voices

== Theatrical release ==
The film was originally a sequence in Melody Time, released May 27, 1948, then reissued as a stand-alone short on Christmas of 1955 and later reissued again by Buena Vista Distribution in 1967 as part of Disney's Cartoon Special.

== Home media ==
The short was included on the DVD releases of Disney's American Legends, on February 12, 2002; Volume 3 of Walt Disney's It's a Small World of Fun! in February 2007; and Volume 6 of Walt Disney Animation Collection: Classic Short Films on May 12, 2009.

== See also ==
- List of films about angels
