= The Many Moods of Tony =

Studio album by Tony Bennett
- Released: January 20, 1964
- Genre: Vocal jazz
- Length: 36:03
- Label: Columbia
- Producer: Ernie Altschuler

Tony Bennett chronology
This Is All I Ask (1963)	The Many Moods of Tony (1964)	When Lights Are Low (1964)

The Many Moods of Tony is an album by Tony Bennett, released on January 20, 1964 by Columbia Records. It was produced by Ernie Altschuler.

The single from the album, "A Taste of Honey", debuted on the Billboard Hot 100 in the issue dated August 22, 1964, peaking at number 94 during its three-week stay, The song peaked at number 19 on the magazine's Easy Listening chart, during its two-weeks stay. and number 82 on the Cashbox singles chart during its eight-weeks stay.

The album debuted on the Billboard Top LPs chart in the issue dated February 22, 1964, and remained on the album chart for 24 weeks, peaking at number 20. It debuted on the Cashbox albums chart in the issue dated February 22, 1964, and remained on the chart for 25 weeks, peaking at number 18.

On November 8, 2011, Sony Music Distribution included the CD in a box set entitled The Complete Collection.

== Critical reception ==
Professional ratings
Review scores
Source	Rating
Record Mirror	4/5 stars

Billboard noted "Tony leans to the ballads mostly with 'When Joanna Love Me', 'I'll Be Around', and 'You've Changed' among the top tracks." American Record Guide referred to it as "an excellent album."

== Track listing ==
1. "The Little Boy" (Al Stillman, Guy Wood) – 2:22
2. "When Joanna Loved Me" (Jack Segal, Robert Wells) – 3:05
3. "A Taste of Honey" (Bobby Scott, Ric Marlow) – 2:51
4. "Soon It's Gonna Rain" (Harvey Schmidt, Tom Jones) – 3:40
5. "The Kid's A Dreamer (The Kid From Fool's Paradise)" featuring Bobby Hacket on cornet (Douglas Arthur, Herb Hendler) – 2:34
6. "So Long, Big Time!" (Harold Arlen, Dory Langdon) – 3:51
7. "Don't Wait Too Long" (Sunny Skylar) – 2:36
8. "Caravan" featuring Chico Hamilton on drums and arranged and conducted by Ralph Sharon (Duke Ellington, Irving Mills, and Juan Tizol) – 2:42
9. "Spring In Manhattan" featuring the Will Bronson Singers (Alice Reach, Anthony Scibetta) – 2:32
10. "I'll Be Around" featuring Bobby Hackett on cornet (Alec Wilder) – 3:05
11. "You've Changed" featuring The Noteworthies and arranged and conducted by Ralph Sharon (Bill Carey, Carl T. Fischer) – 3:16
12. "Limehouse Blues" featuring Dick Hyman on organ (Douglas Furber, Philip Braham) – 3:21

== Charts ==
Chart (1964)	Peak position
US Top LPs (Billboard)	20
US Cash Box	18
