= I Left My Heart in San Francisco =

1962 song popularized by Tony Bennett

- Picture sleeve for early-1960s US single; the other US picture sleeve contains a photo of Tony Bennett

Single by Tony Bennett

from the album I Left My Heart in San Francisco
- A-side: "Once Upon a Time"
- Released: February 2, 1962
- Recorded: January 23, 1962
- Studio: CBS 30th Street Studio, New York City
- Genre: Traditional pop
- Length: 2:52
- Label: Columbia 42332
- Composer: George Cory
- Lyricist: Douglass Cross
- Producer: Ernie Altschuler

Tony Bennett singles chronology
"Till" (1961)	"I Left My Heart in San Francisco" (1962)	"I Wanna Be Around" (1962)

"I Left My Heart In San Francisco"
Tony Bennett's "I Left My Heart In San Francisco"

"I Left My Heart in San Francisco" is a popular song, best known as the signature song of Tony Bennett. It was written in late-1953 in Brooklyn, New York, with music by George Cory (1920–1978) and lyrics by Douglass Cross (1920–1975).

In 1962, the song was released as a single by Bennett on Columbia Records as the b-side to "Once Upon a Time", which peaked at No. 19 on the U.S. Billboard Hot 100. The song was also included on the album I Left My Heart in San Francisco. It reached number seven on the Easy Listening chart. The song is one of the official anthems for the city of San Francisco. In 2018, it was selected for preservation in the National Recording Registry by the Library of Congress as being "culturally, historically, or aesthetically significant".

== Background ==
The music was written by George Cory, with lyrics by Douglass Cross, about two amateur writers nostalgic for San Francisco after moving to New York. It references the San Francisco cable car system and the San Francisco fog.

Although the song was originally written for Claramae Turner, who often used it as an encore, she never got around to recording it (although a recording of her singing it live on a broadcast does exist). The song found its way to Tony Bennett through Ralph Sharon, Bennett's longtime accompanist and friend of the composers. Sharon brought the music along when he and Bennett were on tour and on their way to San Francisco's Fairmont Hotel.

Before Tony Bennett heard it, the song was pitched to Tennessee Ernie Ford, whom Claramae Turner suggested Cross take it to. Ford turned the song down.

In December 1961, in the famous Venetian Room at the Fairmont Hotel in San Francisco, Tony Bennett first sang "I Left My Heart in San Francisco". In the audience that night were San Francisco mayor George Christopher and future mayor Joseph L. Alioto. From the 1960s through the 1980s, Bennett always sang the song at his appearances at the Venetian Room.

== Recording history ==
Bennett first recorded the song at the CBS 30th Street Studio on January 23, 1962; CBS released it as the b-side of "Once Upon A Time"/ The A-side received no attention, and DJs began flipping the record over and playing "San Francisco". It became a hit on the pop singles chart in 1962 and spent close to a year on various other charts, achieving gold record status. It then won the top prize of Grammy Award for Record of the Year, as well as for Best Male Solo Vocal Performance. In 1994, the song was inducted into the Grammy Hall of Fame.

== Legacy ==
In 2001, "I Left My Heart in San Francisco" was ranked 23rd on an RIAA/NEA list of the most historically significant Songs of the 20th Century.

It was often performed in public by Bennett in concert as well as on special occasions. A statue of Tony Bennett was unveiled outside the Fairmont Hotel on 19 August 2016, in honor of his 90th birthday, the hotel performance, and the song's history with San Francisco. Two years later, the block of Mason Street was renamed Tony Bennett Way.

The Songwriters Hall of Fame gave Bennett the Towering Performance Award for his vocal rendition of the song.

Rhythm and blues singer Bobby Womack released a version on Minit Records which peaked at No. 48 on the Billboard R&B chart in 1969.

On May 15, 1984, the song was adopted by the City and County of San Francisco as one of its two official anthems, the other being the title song from the 1936 film San Francisco.

A slower-paced piano only version of the song appears as the intro theme to the Canadian television show Trailer Park Boys.

The San Francisco Giants play the song after each victory at their home field, Oracle Park. Bennett has performed the song live at multiple Giants games, including the 1993 home opener at Candlestick Park and before games in the 2002 and 2010 World Series.

At noon (PDT) on Saturday, April 25, 2020, in the midst of the COVID-19 pandemic and the shelter-in-place orders for people across the United States, San Francisco residents sang "I Left My Heart in San Francisco" in unison from their residences and other places of sheltering as a tribute to the spirit of the city and its fight to keep the virus in check. Tony Bennett led the sing-along.
