= Guido Guidi =

Italian comic book artist and penciller

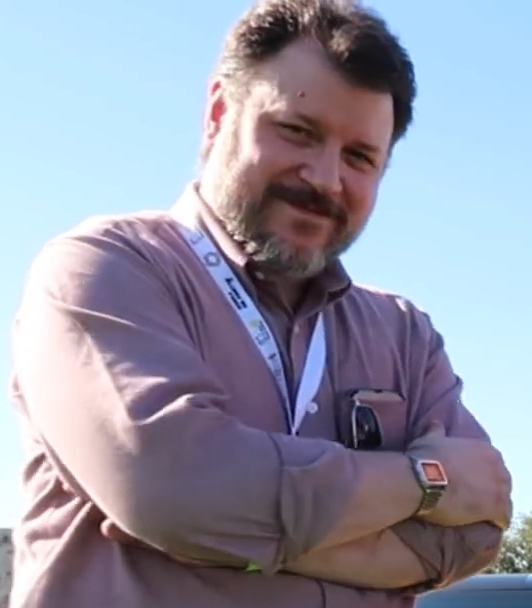
- Guido Guidi in October 2016
- Born: Guido Guidi
- Area: Penciller
- Notable works: Transformers: Armada/Energon; The Transformers: Evolutions

Guido Guidi is an Italian comic book artist. He is best known for his work on Transformers comics.

== Dreamwave Productions ==
A longtime Transformers fan, Guidi was brought in by Dreamwave Productions to be artist for their Transformers: Armada comic, doing issues #8-13 and returning for #18 after a four issue run by Don Figueroa. When the title changed to Transformers: Energon he drew the first two issues (#19-20) and #22. He also contributed heavily to both the G1 and Armada More Than Meets the Eye series. He was scheduled to take over from Figueroa as artist on Dreamwave's G1 ongoing series, but Dreamwave went out of business before his work could be published.

== IDW Publishing ==
Along with other Dreamwave era artists like Figueroa and James Raiz, Guidi was brought in by IDW Publishing when they acquired the Transformers licence in 2005. After some alternative covers for their flagship G1 series The Transformers: Infiltration, he was the principal artist on The Transformers: Evolutions tale Hearts of Steel. His more recent work includes The Transformers: Spotlight issues on Galvatron and Mirage, profile art for the Beast Wars: Sourcebook series and the final issue of Beast Wars: The Ascending, as well as work on issue 5 of Titan UK's Transformers magazine. His most recent work has been as the principal artist on the All Hail Megatron maxi-series.
