= When Lights Are Low (Tony Bennett album) =

Studio album by Tony Bennett
- Released: April 20, 1964
- Recorded: March 26, 1964 (#1–5, 9–12); March 27, 1964 (#6–7); February 26, 1964 (#8, 13–15)
- Studio: United (Las Vegas, Nevada); CBS 30th Street (New York City)
- Genre: Vocal jazz
- Length: 37:20
- Label: Columbia; CS 8975
- Producer: Ernie Altschuler

Tony Bennett chronology
The Many Moods of Tony (1964)	When Lights Are Low (1964)	Who Can I Turn To (1965)

When Lights Are Low is a 1964 studio album by Tony Bennett.

The only single from the album, "It's a Sin to Tell a Lie debuted on the Billboard Hot 100 in the issue dated July 11, 1964, spent a week on the charts, peaking at number 99. and number 81 on the Cashbox singles chart during its two weeks there.

The album debuted on the Billboard Top LPs chart in the issue dated May 23, 1964, and remained on the album chart for 12 weeks, peaking at No. 78, it also debuted on the Cashbox albums chart in the issue dated May 23, 1964, and remained on the chart for in a total of 15 weeks, peaking at No. 29

On November 8, 2011, Sony Music Distribution included the CD in a box set entitled The Complete Collection.

== Track listing ==
1. "Nobody Else but Me" (Jerome Kern, Oscar Hammerstein II) – 2:56
2. "When Lights Are Low" (Benny Carter, Spencer Williams) – 4:57
3. "On Green Dolphin Street" (Bronisław Kaper, Ned Washington) – 4:02
4. "Ain't Misbehavin'" (Fats Waller, Harry Brooks, Andy Razaf) – 2:42
5. "It's a Sin to Tell a Lie" (Billy Mayhew) – 2:18
6. "I've Got Just About Everything" (Bob Dorough) – 6:08
7. "Judy" (Sammy Lerner, Hoagy Carmichael) – 3:00
8. "Oh! You Crazy Moon" (Johnny Burke, Jimmy Van Heusen) – 2:23
9. "Speak Low" (Kurt Weill, Ogden Nash) – 2:08
10. "It Had to Be You" (Isham Jones, Gus Kahn) – 3:15
11. "It Could Happen to You" (Johnny Burke, Jimmy Van Heusen) – 1:18
12. "The Rules of the Road" (Cy Coleman, Carolyn Leigh) – 2:13

Bonus tracks on CD reissue:

13. "How Long Has This Been Going On?" (George Gershwin, Ira Gershwin) – 2:43
14. "All of You" (Cole Porter) – 2:17
15. "We'll Be Together Again" (Carl T. Fischer, Frankie Laine) – 2:44

== Personnel ==
=== Performance ===
- Tony Bennett – vocals
- Ralph Sharon – piano, arranger
- Hal Gaylord – bass
- Billy Exiner – drums
