= The Emperor Jones (film) =

1933 film

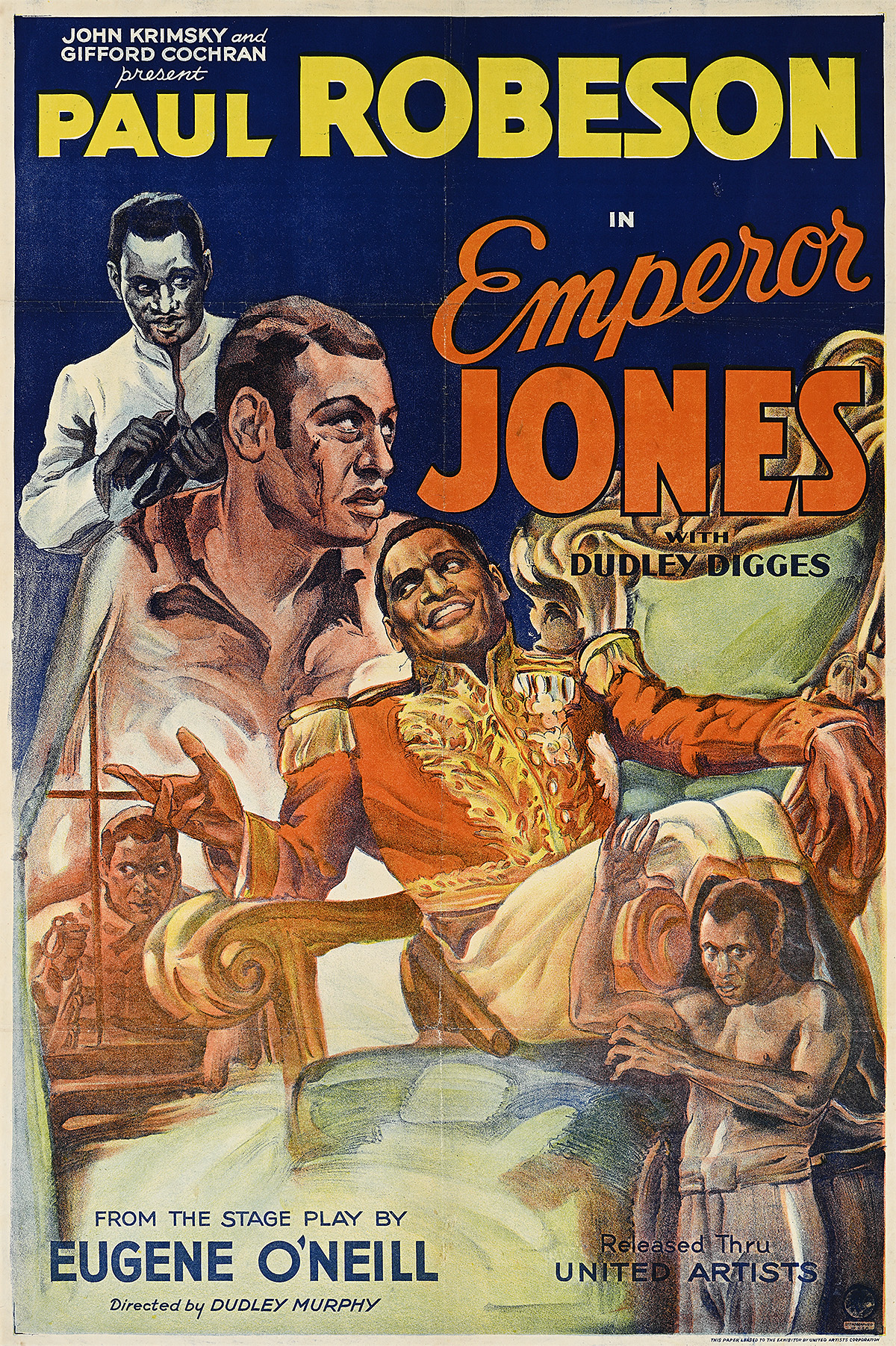
- Theatrical release poster
- Directed by: Dudley Murphy
- Screenplay by: DuBose Heyward
- Based on: The Emperor Jones; 1920 play by Eugene O'Neill
- Produced by: Gifford A. Cochran; John Krimsky
- Starring: Paul Robeson; Dudley Digges; Frank H. Wilson; Fredi Washington; Ruby Elzy
- Cinematography: Ernest Haller
- Edited by: Grant Whytock
- Music by: Rosamond Johnson; Frank Tours
- Distributed by: United Artists
- Release date: September 29, 1933
- Running time: 80 minutes (Original cut); 73 minutes
- Country: United States
- Language: English
- Budget: $263,000

The Emperor Jones

The Emperor Jones is a 1933 American pre-Code film adaptation of Eugene O'Neill's 1920 play of the same title, directed by iconoclast Dudley Murphy, written for the screen by playwright DuBose Heyward and starring Paul Robeson in the title role (a role he played onstage, both in the US and UK), and co-starring Dudley Digges, Frank H. Wilson, Fredi Washington and Ruby Elzy.

The film was made outside of the Hollywood studio system, financed with private money from neophyte wealthy producers in Gifford A. Cochran and John Krimsky, who were best known for bringing the 1932 German film Mädchen in Uniform to American audiences. It was the only film produced by the two (Cochran stopped as a producer after a failed American rendition of The Threepenny Opera that same year). It was filmed at the Paramount studios in Astoria, Queens with the beach scene shot at Jones Beach Long Beach, New York.

== Plot ==
At a Baptist prayer meeting, the preacher leads a prayer for Brutus Jones, who has just been hired as a Pullman porter. Jones proudly shows off his uniform to his girlfriend Dolly before joining the congregation for a spiritual. But Jones is quickly corrupted by the lures of the big city, taking up with fast women and gamblers. One boisterous crap game leads to a fight in which he inadvertently stabs Jeff, the man who had introduced him to the fast life and from whom he had stolen the affections of the beautiful Undine.

Jones is imprisoned and sent to do hard labor on a chain gang. Jones escapes after striking a white guard who was torturing and beating another prisoner. Making his way home, he briefly receives the assistance of his girlfriend Dolly before taking a job stoking coal on a steamer headed for the Caribbean. One day, he catches sight of a remote island and jumps ship, swimming to the island.

The island is under the crude rule of a top-hatted black despot who receives merchandise from Smithers, the colonial merchant who is the sole white person on the island. Jones rises to become Smithers' partner and eventually "Emperor." He dethrones his predecessor with a trick that allows him to survive what appears to be a fusillade of bullets, creating the myth that he can only be slain by a silver bullet. Jones's rule over the island involves increasing taxes on the poor natives and pocketing the proceeds.

Jones, hunted by natives in revolt, flees through the jungle and slowly disintegrates psychologically. Hysterical, he runs into the path of his pursuers.

== Cast ==
- Paul Robeson – Brutus Jones
- Dudley Digges – Smithers
- Frank H. Wilson – Jeff
- Fredi Washington – Undine
- Ruby Elzy – Dolly
- George Haymid Stamper – Lem
- Jackie "Moms" Mabley – Marcella
- Blueboy O'Connor – Treasurer
- Brandon Evans – Carrington
- Rex Ingram – Court Crier
- Harold Nicholas dancer in a club

== Background ==
While the film is based on O'Neil's play, it also adds in a backstory for Jones before getting to O'Neill's text, as well as several new characters to the story (such as Jones' girlfriend, and a friendly priest who advises him to give up his evil ways). The film does provide what may be Robeson's greatest dramatic performance in a movie.

In the film version, the opening shots are of an African ritual dance. Some critics assess the opening as representative of the "primitive" black world to which Brutus Jones will eventually revert, but some scholarly reviews reflect the relationship between the roots of the African-American church and the rhythmic chanting often seen in African religious practices. The film's director Dudley Murphy had co-directed Ballet Mécanique and other musical experimental films. Having just spent several years in Hollywood, he now craved the freedom to use musical forms as a way of translating O'Neill's stage experimentation into film. Robeson was already a musical star and would go on to study traditional African music and dance while on location in Nigeria and with scholars in London.

The film makes copious use of the word "nigger", as did O'Neill's original play. African-Americans criticized O'Neill's language at the time, so its preservation and expansion in the film present another cause for critique. In fact, in the original production in 1920, the actor playing Jones, Charles Sidney Gilpin, a leading man in the all-African-American Lafayette players, voiced his objections to O'Neill and began substituting "Negro" in the Provincetown Players premiere. He continued to do so when the show went on tour for two years.

O'Neill had based the character, down to some specific traits and use of language, on an African-American friend from the New England waterfront, and felt that the use of the word was dramatically justified. Gilpin and O'Neill could not reconcile, and O'Neill gave the part to the much younger and unknown Robeson for the 1924 New York revival and then its London premiere, both of which launched Robeson as the first African-American leading man of American and British theater.

== Production ==
The Emperor Jones was planned for ten days of location shooting in Haiti, but budget restrictions required shooting the film in the Astoria studios, underutilized following to the abandonment of the industry for the West Coast. Murphy was restricted to a trip to Haiti to bring back extras, musicians and dancers. As a newly self-imposed exile of the Hollywood studio system, Murphy had insisted on New York instead of Los Angeles to be free of Hollywood control. As the co-director of Ballet Mécanique—though Fernand Léger would become far more famous for the experimental film—Murphy had explored avant-garde film from its earliest days in Paris, and he wanted that creative freedom that New York symbolized to him. He also prized access to the New York-based African-American community's highly trained theatrical talent. Robeson had only one location requirement: no filming south of the Mason–Dixon line.

The producers, director and screenwriter were required to present the screenplay to Eugene O'Neill before filming could commence. They were apprehensive because they had added material by making new scenes from the stage monologues, but O'Neill gave the screenplay his blessing, saying that the group had "written a fine three-act play." O'Neill received $30,000 for the rights, which he badly needed for an expensive summer home that he had just purchased. Paul Robeson earned $5,000 a week, comparable to stars' salaries in Hollywood. The budget was roughly $200,000.

Dudley Murphy and screenwriter DuBose Heyward had both been experimenting in using imagery held together by the film's music, rather than by dialogue or narrative. In the case of The Emperor Jones, Murphy was trying to do both, not always successfully. Robeson would later complain that Murphy was condescending toward him and that he was rushed through important scenes. Murphy had no theater background and some reports indicated that William C. deMille was recruited to complete the jungle scenes.

Emperor Jones also suffered at the hands of the Hays Office, whose Production Code was in place and had been since 1930, if only haphazardly enforced until the arrival of censor Joseph Breen the following year.

Black-on-white violence was strictly forbidden, so a scene in which Jones kills a sadistic white prison guard had to be removed, leaving a gap in the action. Scenes depicting Haitian women smoking and one showing a white trader lighting a cigarette for the Emperor were also cut. A steamy scene between Robeson and Fredi Washington as a prostitute had to be reshot when the Hays Office decreed that she was too light-skinned and might be mistaken for a white woman. Washington wore dark makeup when the scene was reshot. The scenes depicting the hallucinations in the jungle of the slave ship and the auction were removed, undercutting the film's "dramatic resonance and doing a serious injustice to Eugene O'Neill's play," as Murphy's biographer wrote in 2005.

== Reception ==
The film was a box-office disappointment for United Artists.

The black-and-white film was tinted blue for the jungle scenes, though the tint disappeared from most prints as it was seen as a relic of the silent-film era.

In 1999, The Emperor Jones was deemed "culturally, historically, or aesthetically significant" by the United States Library of Congress, and selected for preservation in the National Film Registry. Subsequently, the Library of Congress restored the film in 2002, using archive footage. This version was able to restore the cut scenes of black-on-white violence, in addition to several minor changes. Unfortunately, no existing film of the two cut dream sequences was found, and this edition remains incomplete.

== Home media ==
Because United Artists failed to renew the copyright to the film in time, the film is in the public domain and can be purchased at many online outlets. A newly remastered version (with commentary and extras) was released on DVD by The Criterion Collection in 2006.

== Sources ==
- Mordaunt Hall (September 20, 1933). "Emperor Jones (1933): Paul Robeson in the Pictorial Conception of Eugene O'Neill's Play, The Emperor Jones". The New York Times.
