= Circle 7 (disambiguation) =

The Circle 7 logo is an often-used television station logo in the United States.

Circle 7 may also refer to:

- Circle Seven Animation, a former division of Walt Disney Feature Animation
- Circle 7 Koran, a sacred text of the Moorish Science Temple of America
- The 7th circle of hell in Dante's Inferno
