= John Franklin Henry =

Mississippi politician

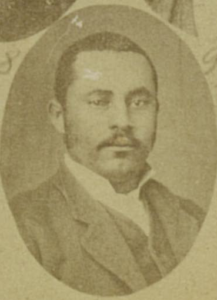

John Franklin Henry was a preacher, farmer, and state legislator in Mississippi. He represented Madison County, Mississippi in the Mississippi House of Representatives in 1884 and 1885.

He was born in Mississippi.

He was lampooned as wanting to exempt Madison County from all laws he does not consider fit.

He served with Samuel W. Lewis in the House and state senator George Harvey as the state senator from Madison County.

== See also ==
- African American officeholders from the end of the Civil War until before 1900
