= Jacques Wolfe =

American songwriter (1896–1973)

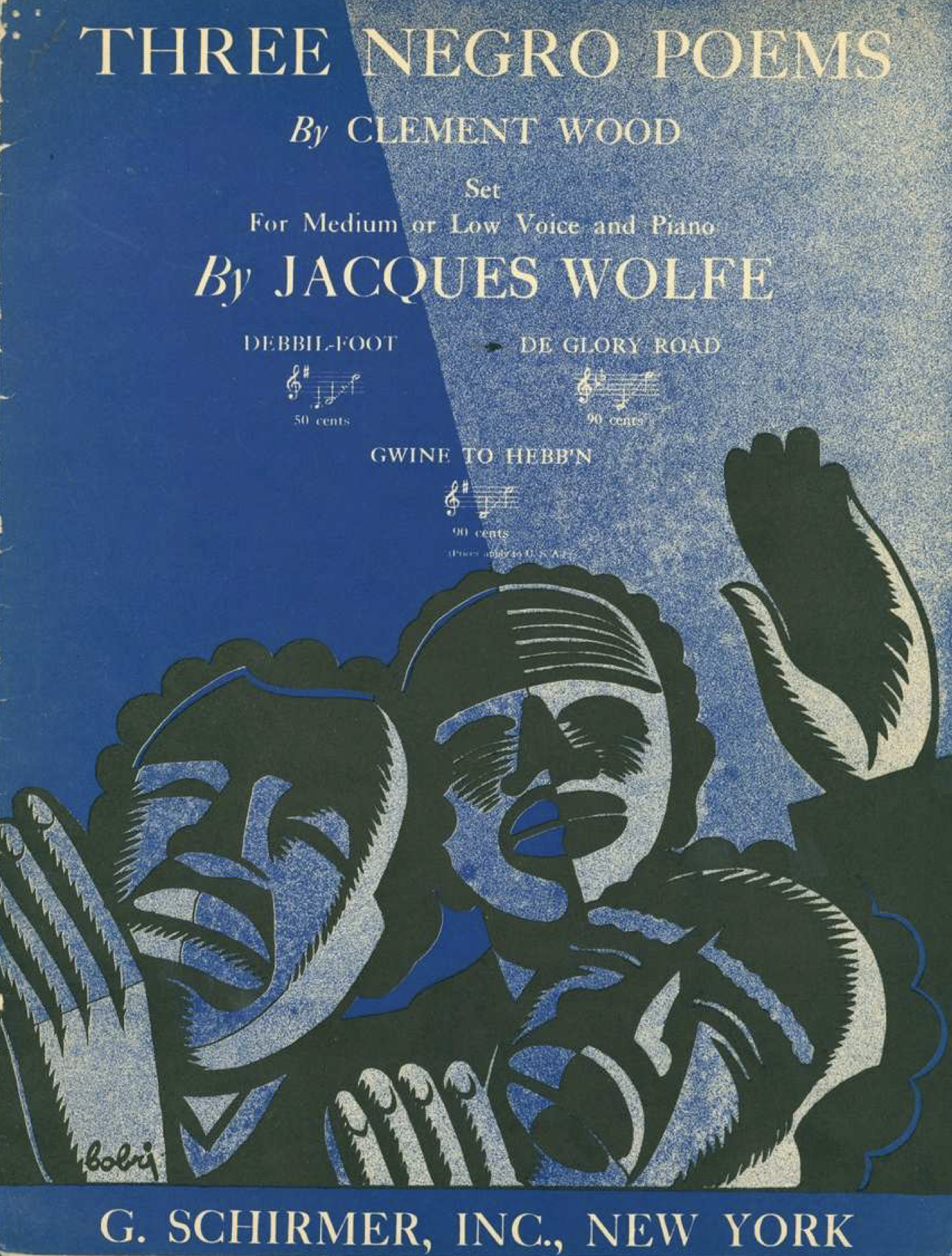
Front cover of 1928 sheet music for "Three Negro Poems" with music by Jacques Wolfe and words by Clement Wood.

Jacques Leon Wolfe (April 29, 1896 – June 22, 1973) was a Romanian-born American songwriter.

Wolfe was born into a Jewish family in Botoşani, Romania. His family emigrated to New York when he was a very young child. He displayed musical talent as a youngster and, at 16, he entered the Institute of Musical Art, now known as Juilliard School. During World War I, he was stationed at Governor’s Island, where he played clarinet in a military band. Transferred south, Wolfe made his first direct contact with African-American music. He was fascinated with the genre and did extensive research on the history of black folk songs and spirituals. He became inspired to write his own music based on the style. His spirituals and “work songs” became very popular in sheet music form in the early 1930s. In 1934 Wolfe collaborated with poet Langston Hughes to write "Sad Song in de Air," published by Robbins Music Corp.

Jacques Wolfe published a music arrangement of the folk song "Short'nin' Bread" in 1928 with words edited by Clement Wood. The song is a vaudeville "blackface" song written for stage during blackface shows. The music was published by Harold Flammer and distributed by G. Schirmer in New York City.

Also set "Three Negro Poems" by Clement Wood to music for "medium or low voice and piano". Published in 1928 by G. Schirmer, the three songs are entitled: "Debil-Foot", "De Glory Road" and "Gwine to Hebb'n". "De Glory Road" appears dedicated to Paul Robeson.

Wolfe wrote the music for the 1931 film The Prodigal and in 1938, composed the music for a Broadway musical based on Roark Bradford’s John Henry, starring Paul Robeson in the title role. The musical opened in January 1940 and, some reviewers thought because of a weak script, closed five days later.
