= John Henry (2000 film) =

- Key art for the short made for Disney's American Legends (2002)
- Directed by: Mark Henn (director), Robert Ty Stanton (art direction)
- Story by: Shirley Pierce (screenplay) and Broose Johnson and Tim Hodge (story supervisor)
- Based on: John Henry
- Produced by: Steven Keller
- Starring: Alfre Woodard; Geoffrey Jones
- Narrated by: Alfre Woodard
- Edited by: Beth Collins-Stegmaier (animation editor)
- Music by: Stephen James Taylor
- Animation by: Barry Temple; Theodore Ty
- Layouts by: Andrew Edward Harkness
- Backgrounds by: Peter Raymundo; Kevin A. Barber; Janelle C. Bell-Martin; James W. Elston
- Production companies: Walt Disney Feature Animation; Walt Disney Feature Animation Florida
- Distributed by: Buena Vista Pictures
- Release date: October 30, 2000
- Running time: 10 min.
- Country: United States
- Language: English

John Henry is an animated short film from Walt Disney Animation Studios directed by Mark Henn, released on October 30, 2000.

The short is based on African American folk hero John Henry.

== Synopsis ==
A narration by John's wife Polly explains his early life: said to have been "born with a hammer in his hand", John was a slave alongside Polly until they were granted their freedom and soon married. As a wedding gift, Polly gives John a massive sledgehammer forged from his old shackles and John promises her that he will die holding that hammer. Searching for land to settle down in, they come across a group of other former slaves and Irish immigrants hired to build railways, but the contract they are working under to receive land if they complete the railways only grants a shorter period of time than required. However, the hard work tires almost all the men. John, who has the stamina of ten men, inspires them to keep working and never give up.

Despite all this, the contract is cancelled by the amoral business owner and the workers' place is taken by a steam drill. John refuses to back down and proves that man can achieve more than a machine by challenging the steam drill driver to a race for who can finish the railroad first. If John can beat the machine, the land promised to the workers must be delivered. He builds the railway and even a tunnel straight through a mountain, the steam drill breaking before it can finish. However, the workers' celebration turns bittersweet as John collapses from exhaustion. Realizing he won't live much longer, Polly gently places John's hammer in his hand before he dies with a smile on his face. The short film ends by showing that the story was being told to John's young son in their house in the town that now covers the land that John's sacrificial victory gave them. The child is scared by some thunder, but Polly tells him that it's just the sound of his father, hammering in the sky.

== Voice cast ==
- Alfre Woodard - Polly / Narrator
- Geoffrey Jones - John Henry
- Tim Hodge - MacTavish
- Dave Murray - Thomas
- Carrie Harrington - Singing Voice of Polly

== Home media ==
The DVDs Disney's American Legends as released in 2002 and Walt Disney Animation Studios Short Films Collection featured this short. Apart from its DVD release, the short film was only shown in one theatre in the USA, namely Hollywood's El Capitan Theatre. There, the short film was shown six times in three days.
