= John Henry (folklore) =

Folklore character

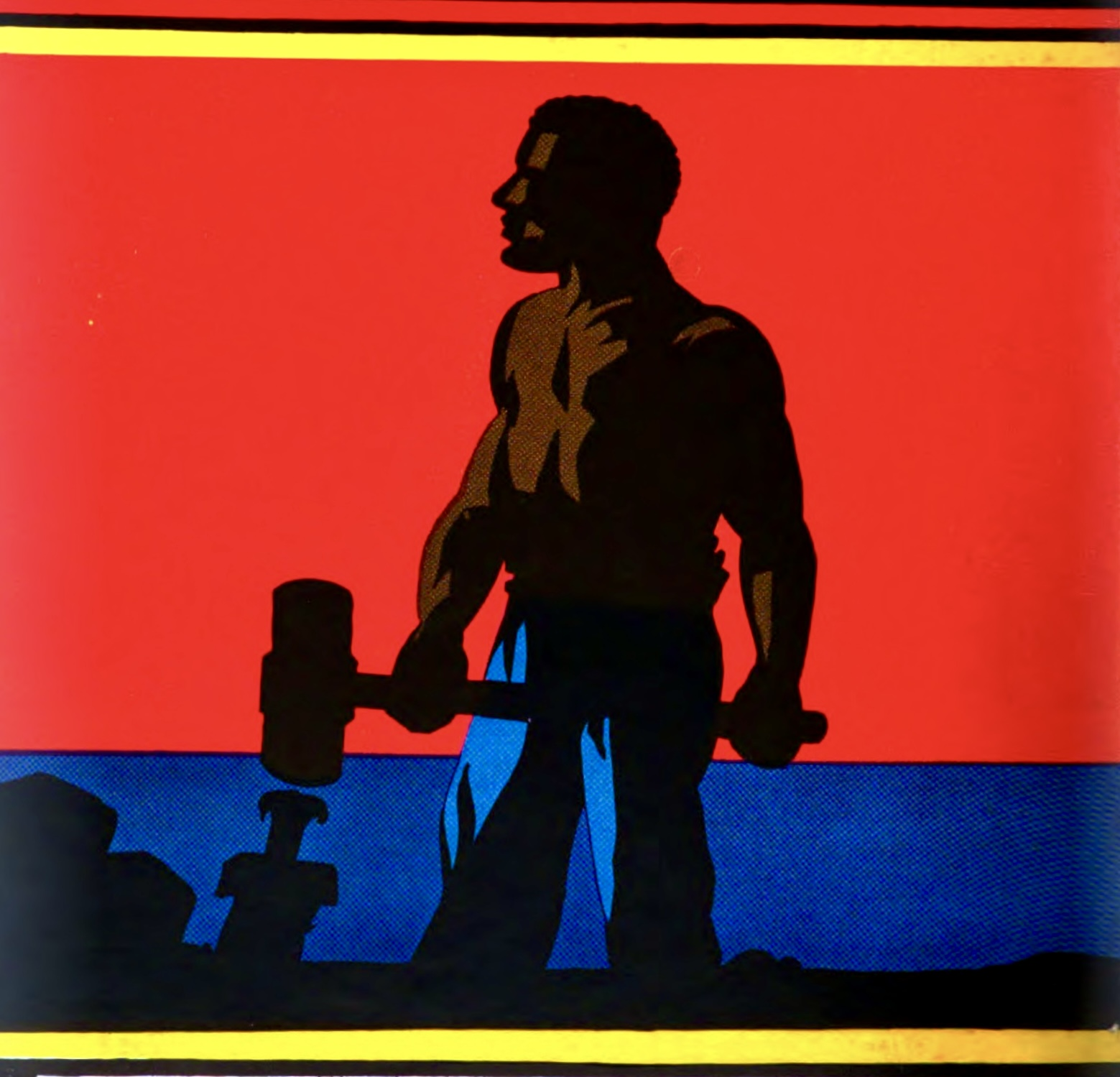
- John Henry illustration by Roy E. LaGrone (1942)
- Born: 1840s or 1850s
- Occupation: Railroad worker
- Known for: American folk hero

John Henry is an American folk hero. A Black American freedman, he is said to have worked as a "steel-driving man"—a man tasked with hammering a steel drill (such as a star drill or similar) into a rock to make holes for explosives to blast the rock in constructing a railroad tunnel.

The story of John Henry is told in a classic blues folk song about his duel against a drilling machine, which exists in many versions, and has been the subject of numerous stories, plays, books, and novels.

== Legend ==
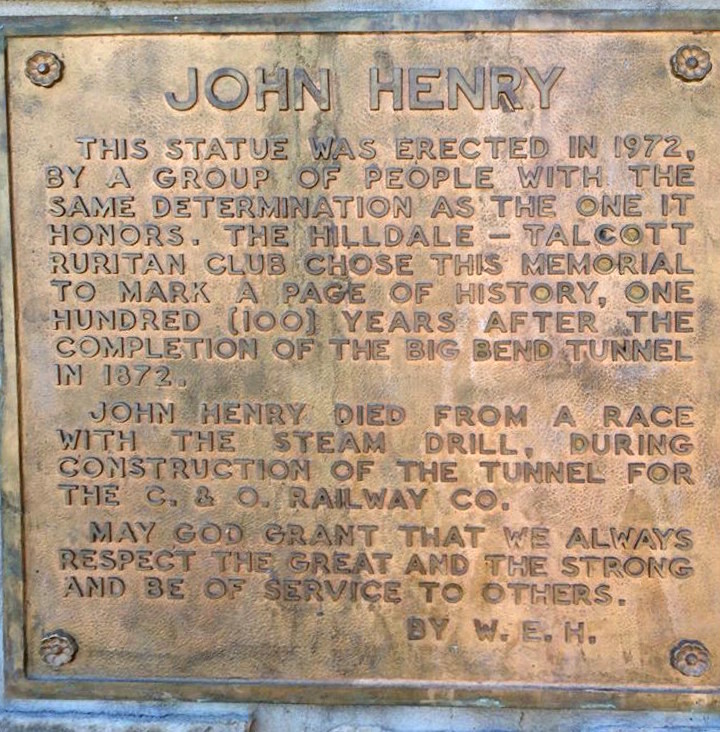
Plaque celebrating the legend of John Henry (Talcott, West Virginia)

According to legend, John Henry's prowess as a steel driver was measured in a race against a steam-powered rock drill, a race that he won only to die in victory with a hammer in hand as his heart gave out from stress. Various locations, including Big Bend Tunnel in West Virginia, Lewis Tunnel in Virginia, and Coosa Mountain Tunnel in Alabama, have been suggested as the site of the contest.

A real hammerman would have needed to work in tandem with a shaker, who would hold a chisel-like drill against mountain rock, wiggling and rotating the drill to optimize its bite. However, John Henry's shaker is seldom if ever mentioned in the tale. As a result, some retellings recast John Henry as a railroad worker driving spikes into railway tracks, and his mechanical opponent as a primitive rail fastening system.

== History ==
The historical accuracy of many of the aspects of the John Henry legend are subject to debate. According to researcher Scott Reynolds Nelson, the actual John Henry was born in 1848 in New Jersey and died of silicosis, a complication of his workplace, rather than from exhaustion.

Several locations have been put forth for the tunnel on which John Henry died.

=== Big Bend Tunnel ===
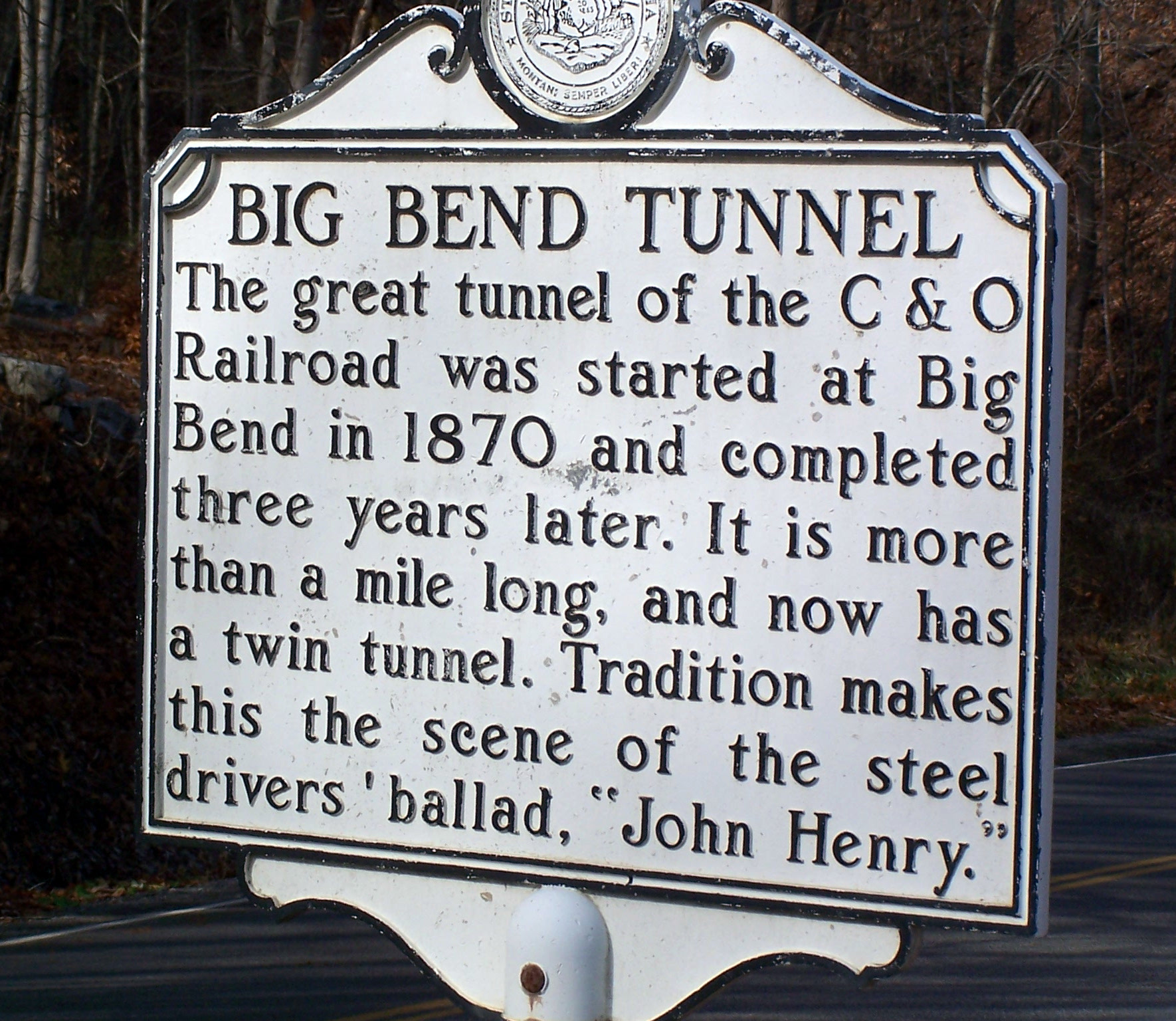
Sign outside of the Big Bend Tunnel noting its connection to the legend of John Henry

Sociologist Guy Benton Johnson investigated the legend of John Henry in the late 1920s. He concluded that John Henry might have worked on the Chesapeake and Ohio Railway's (C&O Railway) Big Bend Tunnel but that "one can make out a case either for or against" it. The tunnel was built near Talcott, West Virginia, from 1870 to 1872 (according to Johnson's dating), and named for the big bend in the Greenbrier River nearby.

Some versions of the song refer to the location of John Henry's death as "The Big Bend Tunnel on the C. & O." In 1927, Johnson visited the area and found one man who said he had seen it.

This man, known as Neal Miller, told me in plain words how he had come to the tunnel with his father at 17, how he carried water and drills for the steel drivers, how he saw John Henry every day, and, finally, all about the contest between John Henry and the steam drill.

"When the agent for the steam drill company brought the drill here," said Mr. Miller, "John Henry wanted to drive against it. He took a lot of pride in his work and he hated to see a machine take the work of men like him.

"Well, they decided to hold a test to get an idea of how practical the steam drill was. The test went on all day and part of the next day.

"John Henry won. He wouldn't rest enough, and he overdid. He took sick and died soon after that."

Mr. Miller described the steam drill in detail. I made a sketch of it and later when I looked up pictures of the early steam drills, I found his description correct. I asked people about Mr. Miller's reputation, and they all said, "If Neal Miller said anything happened, it happened."

When Johnson contacted Chief Engineer C. W. Johns of the C&O Railroad regarding Big Bend Tunnel, Johns replied that "no steam drills were ever used in this tunnel." When asked about documentation from the period, Johns replied that "all such papers have been destroyed by fire."

Talcott holds a yearly festival named for Henry, and a statue and memorial plaque have been placed in John Henry Historical Park at the eastern end of the tunnel.

=== Lewis Tunnel ===
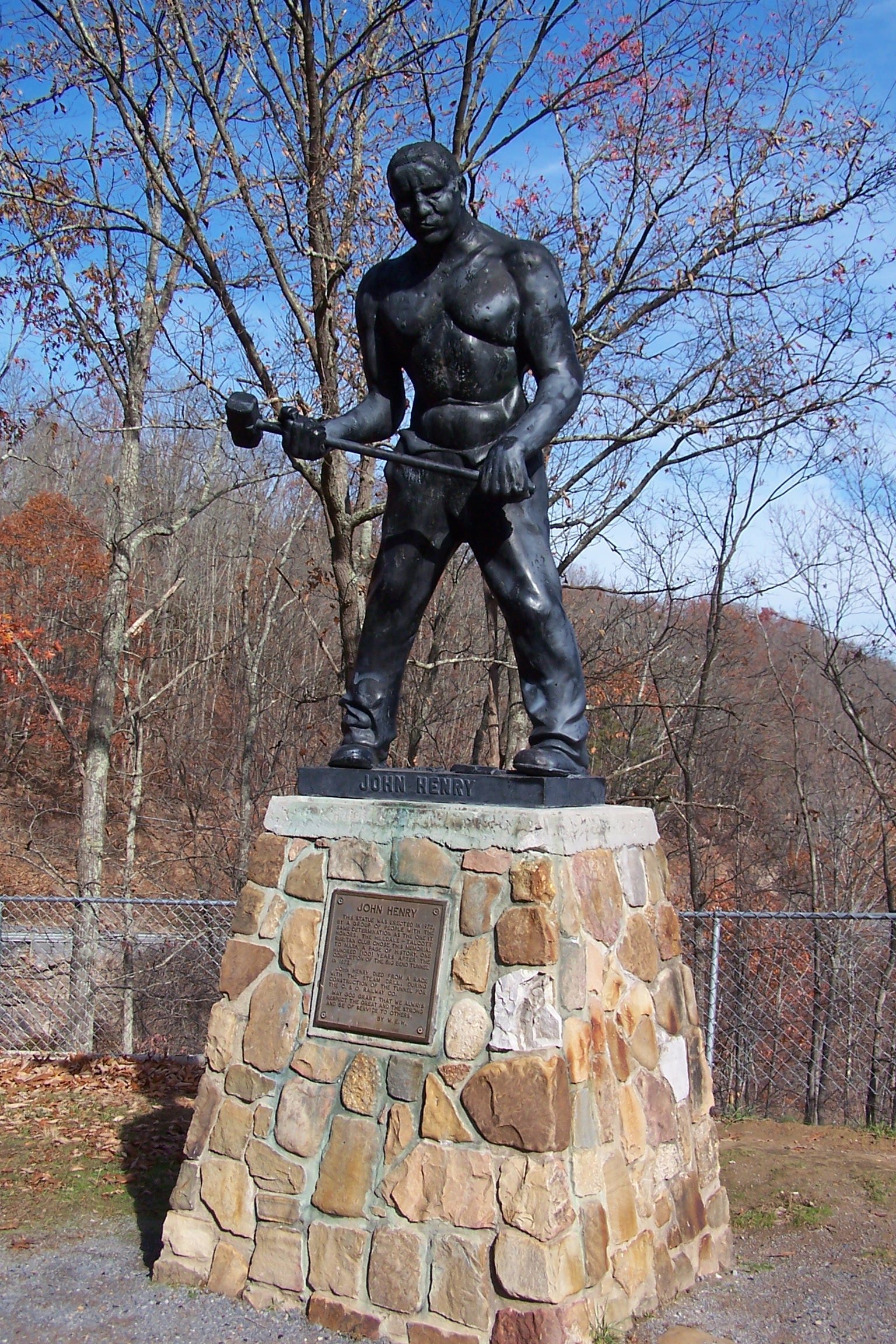
John Henry statue in Summers County, West Virginia

In the 2006 book Steel Drivin' Man: John Henry, the Untold Story of an American Legend, historian Scott Reynolds Nelson detailed his discovering documentation of a 19-year-old African-American man alternately referred to as John Henry, John W. Henry, or John William Henry in previously unexplored prison records of the Virginia Penitentiary. At the time, penitentiary inmates were hired out as laborers to various contractors, and this John Henry was noted as having headed the first group of prisoners to be assigned tunnel work. Nelson also discovered the C&O's tunneling records, which the company believed had been destroyed by fire. Henry, like many African Americans, might have come to Virginia to work on the clean-up of the battlefields after the American Civil War. Arrested and tried for burglary, John Henry was in the first group of convicts released by the warden to work as leased labor on the C&O Railway.

According to Nelson, objectionable conditions at the Virginia prison led the warden to believe that the prisoners, many of whom had been arrested on trivial charges, would be better clothed and fed if they were released as laborers to private contractors (he subsequently changed his mind about this and became an opponent of the convict labor system). In the C&O's tunneling records, Nelson found no evidence of a steam drill used in Big Bend Tunnel.

The records Nelson found indicate that the contest took place 40 miles (64 km) away at the Lewis Tunnel, between Talcott and Millboro, Virginia, where prisoners did indeed work beside steam drills night and day. Nelson also argues that the verses of the ballad about John Henry being buried near "the white house," "in the sand," somewhere that locomotives roar, mean that Henry's body was buried in a ditch behind the so-called white house of the Virginia State Penitentiary, which photos from that time indicate was painted white, and where numerous unmarked graves have been found.

Prison records for John William Henry stopped in 1873, suggesting that he was kept on the record books until it was clear that he was not coming back and had died. Nelson stresses that John Henry would have been representative of the many hundreds of convict laborers who were killed in unknown circumstances tunneling through the mountains or who died shortly afterwards of silicosis from dust created by the drills and blasting.

== In popular culture ==
The tale of John Henry has been used as a symbol in many cultural movements, including labor movements and the Civil Rights Movement. Philosopher Jeanette Bicknell said of the John Henry legend:

John Henry is a symbol of physical strength and endurance, of exploited labor, of the dignity of a human being against the degradations of the machine age, and of racial pride and solidarity. During World War II his image was used in U.S. government propaganda as a symbol of social tolerance and diversity.

=== Film ===
- In 1995, John Henry was portrayed in the movie Tall Tale by Roger Aaron Brown. A former slave, John Henry appears to a runaway farmer's son named Daniel to both protect him from ruffians (alongside fellow folk hero figures Daniel's father told his son about, Pecos Bill and Paul Bunyan) and impart life lesson wisdom to him.
- In 2020, Terry Crews played a contemporary adaptation of the character in John Henry. The plot centers around a former gang member who takes in two young teens who are on the run from the leader of his past. The film was released by Saban Films.

==== Animation ====
- In 1946, animator George Pal adapted the tale of John Henry into a short film titled John Henry and the Inky-Poo as part of his theatrical stop-motion Puppetoons series. The short is considered a milestone in American cinema as one of the first films to have a positive view of African-American folklore.
- In 1974, Nick Bosustow and David Adams co-produced an 11-minute animated short, The Legend of John Henry, for Paramount Pictures.
- The character appears in a Walt Disney Feature Animation short film, John Henry (2000). Directed by Mark Henn, plans for theatrical releases in 2000 and 2001 fell through after the short had a limited Academy Award qualifying run in Los Angeles; a shorter version was released as the only new entry in the direct-to-video release Disney's American Legends (2002). It was eventually released in its original format as an interstitial on the Disney Channel, and later as part of the home video compilation Walt Disney Animation Studios Short Films Collection in 2015.
- In 2001, Russian animator Andrey Zolotukhin directed a 13-minute animated short, John Henry, Steel Driving Man, for HBO. The short became a part of animated series Animated Tales of the World, which received a Primetime Emmy Award for Outstanding Individual Achievement in Animation.

=== Television ===
- The Grim Adventures of Billy & Mandy Season 6 episode "Short Tall Tales" shows a parody of John Henry's tale with Irwin in the role. Grim decides to sabotage the story by powering up the drilling machine to go faster, and Irwin forces himself to hammer through the mountain faster to surpass it, but by doing so he ends up breaking into the 8th dimension, where aliens feed him to one of their giant monstrous females.
- A plot similar to the story of John Henry is featured in season 5 episode 88b of SpongeBob SquarePants, in which Squidward debuts a "patty gadget" in the hopes of replacing SpongeBob's role in the restaurant, leading to a duel of skill between the two. Like many traditional tellings of the story, the episode is presented as a narrated, rhyming ballad.
- John Henry is featured in the 22nd episode of Season 5 of Teen Titans Go!, "Tall Titan Tales".
- John Henry appears in the Pinky and the Brain episode "A Legendary Tail".
- Henry was the center of an episode of the Nickelodeon game show Legends of the Hidden Temple. The objective on the show saw contestants learn of the legend of John Henry, compete in challenges based on his story, and the winning team attempt to retrieve his hammer from the show's Temple.
- The AI character of John Henry (Garret Dillahunt), from season 2 of Terminator: The Sarah Connor Chronicles, is named after the folk hero for managing to beat a machine that replaces the work of man - paralleling the central conflict of the show and the franchise of fighting against an artificial superintelligence that nearly causes the extinction of the human race in the future through nuclear attacks and Terminators.
- John Henry appears in a segment of the short-lived Bill & Ted's Excellent Adventures TV series. In an episode titled "Pocket Watch Full of Miracles", which aired in November 1990, John Henry is portrayed as having the mannerisms of Muhammad Ali. He challenges and beats a steam-powered hammer driven by his boss. His prize is an antique pocket watch owned by Queen Victoria. The watch is given to the titular Bill and Ted, only to be immediately destroyed by a runaway train.
- Danny Glover played the character in the series, Shelley Duvall's Tall Tales & Legends from 1985 to 1987. Shelley Duvall served as the series' creator, presenter, narrator, and executive producer.
- On the Adult Swim series, Saul of the Mole Men, John Henry (voiced by Tommy "Tiny" Lister) has been living at the centre of the Earth since his victory over the steam drill, having become a cyborg at sometime in the intervening centuries. He befriends and later sacrifices himself to save protagonist Saul Malone.

=== Radio ===
Destination Freedom, a 1950s American old time radio series written by Richard Durham, featured John Henry in a July 1949 episode.

=== Music ===
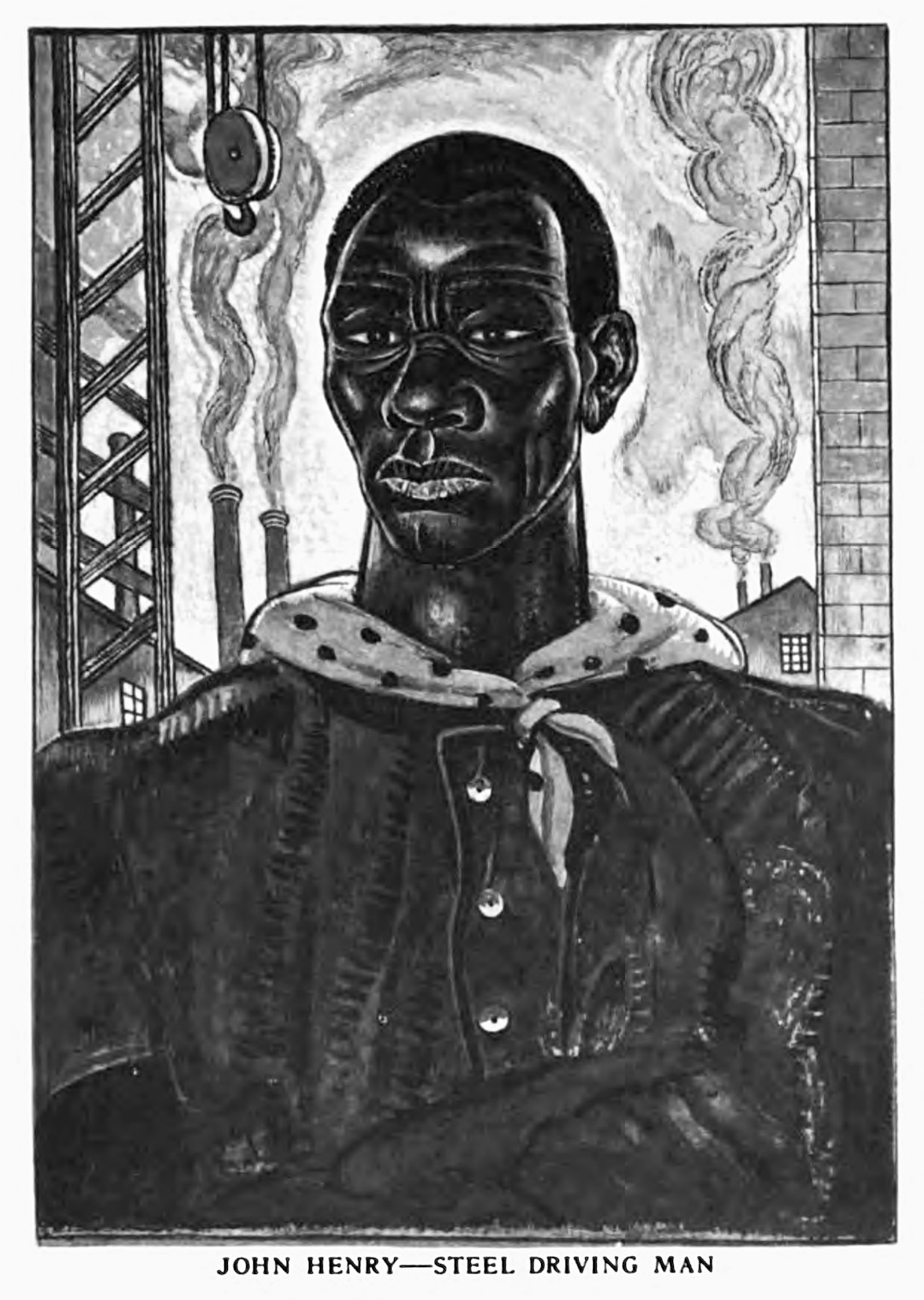
Eben Given illustration of "John Henry—Steel Driving Man" from Here's audacity: American legendary heroes (1930)

The story of John Henry is traditionally told through two types of songs: ballads, commonly called "The Ballad of John Henry", and "hammer songs" (a type of work song), each with wide-ranging and varying lyrics. Some songs, and some early folk historian research, conflate the songs about John Henry with those of John Hardy, a West Virginian outlaw. Ballads about John Henry's life typically contain four major components: a premonition by John Henry as a child that steel-driving would lead to his death, the lead-up to and the results of the legendary race against the steam hammer, Henry's death and burial, and the reaction of his wife.

The well-known narrative ballad of "John Henry" is usually sung in an upbeat tempo. Hammer songs associated with the "John Henry" ballad, however, are not. Sung more slowly and deliberately, often with a pulsating beat suggestive of swinging the hammer, these songs usually contain the lines "This old hammer killed John Henry / but it won't kill me." Nelson explains that:

... workers managed their labor by setting a "stint," or pace, for it. Men who violated the stint were shunned ... Here was a song that told you what happened to men who worked too fast: they died ugly deaths; their entrails fell on the ground. You sang the song slowly, you worked slowly, you guarded your life, or you died.

There is some controversy among scholars over which came first, the ballad or the hammer songs. Some scholars have suggested that the "John Henry" ballad grew out of the hammer songs, while others believe that the two were always entirely separate.

Songs featuring the story of John Henry have been recorded by many musical artists and bands of different ethnic backgrounds. These include:

- The Williamson Brothers & Curry

"Gonna Die With My Hammer in My Hand", recorded in 1927 and compiled in the Anthology of American Folk Music (1952)

- Henry Thomas
- Charley Crockett
- Mississippi Fred McDowell (on Ann Arbor Blues Festival 1969: Vols 1&2)
- Doc Watson
- Burl Ives
- John Hartford (on Goin' Back to Dixie)
- Jesse Fuller
- Cannonball Adderley – Big Man: The Legend of John Henry
- Bill Monroe
- The New Christy Minstrels

"John Henry and the Steam Drill" and "Natural Man", both on Land of Giants (1964)

- Dave Van Ronk Dave Van Ronk Sings Ballads, Blues, and a Spiritual
- Kabir Suman
- Hemanga Biswas
- Johnny Cash
- Drive-By Truckers (on their The Dirty South album)
- Joe Bonamassa
- Furry Lewis
- Big Bill Broonzy
- Pink Anderson
- Fiddlin' John Carson
- Uncle Dave Macon
- J. E. Mainer
- Leon Bibb
- Lead Belly
- Woody Guthrie
- Paul Robeson
- Pete Seeger
- Van Morrison
- Bruce Springsteen
- Gillian Welch
- Cuff the Duke
- Ramblin' Jack Elliott
- Jerry Reed
- Jerry Lee Lewis
- Merle Travis, Jimmy Dean
- Harry Belafonte
- Mississippi John Hurt (as "Spike Driver Blues")
- Lonnie Donegan
- Jack Warshaw
- John Fahey
- Steve Earle
- Justin Townes Earle
- The Limeliters
- Emily Saliers
- Willie Watson
- Bill Wood
- Smothers Brothers on their 1963 album Think Ethnic
- Songs: Ohia
- Charlie Parr
- Those Poor Bastards
- Greg Freeman

The story also inspired the Aaron Copland's orchestral composition "John Henry" (1940, revised 1952), the 1994 chamber music piece Come Down Heavy by Evan Chambers and the 2009 chamber music piece Steel Hammer by the composer Julia Wolfe.

They Might Be Giants named their fifth studio album after John Henry as an allusion to their usage of a full band on this album rather than the drum machine that they had employed previously.

The American cowpunk band Nine Pound Hammer is named after the traditional description of the hammer John Henry wielded.

Bengali musician Hemanga Biswas translated the song in Bengali. Bangladeshi mass singer Fakir Alamgir later covered this version of the song.

=== Literature ===
- Henry is the subject of the 1931 Roark Bradford novel John Henry, illustrated by noted woodcut artist J. J. Lankes. The novel was adapted into a stage musical in 1940, starring Paul Robeson in the title role. According to Steven Carl Tracy, Bradford's works were influential in broadly popularizing the John Henry legend beyond railroad and mining communities and outside of African American oral histories.
- In a 1933 article published in The Journal of Negro Education, Bradford's John Henry was criticized for "making over a folk-hero into a clown." A 1948 obituary for Bradford described John Henry as "a better piece of native folklore than Paul Bunyan."
- Ezra Jack Keats's John Henry: An American Legend, published in 1965, is a notable picture book chronicling the history of John Henry and portraying him as the "personification of the medieval Everyman who struggles against insurmountable odds and wins."
- Colson Whitehead's 2001 novel John Henry Days uses the John Henry myth as story background. Whitehead fictionalized the John Henry Days festival in Talcott, West Virginia and the release of the John Henry postage stamp in 1996.
- In his nonfiction account Steel Drivin' Man: John Henry, the Untold Story of an American Legend (Oxford University Press 2008), historian Scott Reynolds Nelson attempts to find the real man behind the legend, with a particular focus on Reconstruction-era Virginia and the use of prison labor for building railroads.
- Elements of John Henry's legend were featured in DC Comics.
  - The superhero Steel's civilian name "John Henry Irons" is inspired by John Henry. The story of John Henry further inspired Steel's weapon of choice, a sledgehammer.
    - In Darwyn Cooke's 2004 revisiting of DC continuity, DC: The New Frontier, an African-American man named John Wilson becomes a vigilante named John Henry in order to battle the Ku Klux Klan after his family is lynched; Cooke subsequently described him as an intermediate character between John Henry Irons and John Henry.
  - In DC's Super Friends #21 (January 2010), Superman encountered the actual John Henry after being placed in the folk tale by the Queen of Fables.
  - Issue #6 of "Flashpoint Beyond" and issue #1 of The New Golden Age revealed that there was a Golden Age superhero named John Henry Jr.
- John Henry the Revelator by Constantine von Hoffman is a magical realist novel, in which a teenage boy in 1930s Alabama, Moses Crawford, acquires superpowers and helps challenge the nation's white power structure. The black community calls Crawford John Henry, after the folk hero, because no one is aware of his true identity.
- He makes an appearance in the IDW Publishing miniseries The Transformers: Hearts of Steel, with the steel-driving machine being the alternate mode of the Autobot Bumblebee, who ends up befriending Henry.

=== United States postage stamp ===
In 1996, the US Postal Service issued a John Henry postage stamp. It was part of a set honoring American folk heroes that included Paul Bunyan, Pecos Bill and Casey at the Bat.

=== Games ===
- John Henry was featured as a fictional character in the 2014 video game Wasteland 2. The story is referenced by various NPCs throughout the game and is also available in full as a series of in game books which tell the story of the competition between John Henry and a contingent of robotic workers.
- Big Bend Tunnel, is a location in Fallout 76.
- He also appeared as a playable character in the Nintendo 3DS game Code Name: S.T.E.A.M. voiced by Michael Dorn.
- John Henry was a member of the original BLU team according to the lore of the game Team Fortress 2.
- John Henry is a playable character in the board game Unmatched. He is found in the set Unmatched: Stars and Stripes alongside George Washington, Wyatt Earp, and Rosie the Riveter.

== See also ==
- John Henryism – Strategy for coping with prolonged exposure to stress
- Alexei Stakhanov – Soviet miner (1906–1977)
- Paul Bunyan – Giant lumberjack in American folklore
- Ole Pete – Folk legend of Port Tampa, Florida
- Pecos Bill – Fictional cowboy
- Technological unemployment
