= I Wanna Be Around =

Song written by Sadie Vimmerstedt and Johnny Mercer

Song
- Published: 1962 by Commander Publications
- Songwriters: Sadie Vimmerstedt and Johnny Mercer

"I Wanna Be Around"

Single by Tony Bennett

from the album I Wanna Be Around...
- B-side: "I Will Live My Life for You"
- Released: November 16, 1962
- Recorded: October 19, 1962
- Studio: Columbia 30th Street Studio, New York City
- Genre: Jazz, traditional pop
- Length: 2:03
- Label: Columbia
- Songwriters: Sadie Vimmerstedt, Johnny Mercer
- Producer: Ernest Altschuler

Tony Bennett singles chronology
"Candy Kisses" (1962)	"I Wanna Be Around" (1962)	"The Good Life" (1963)

"I Wanna Be Around" is a popular song credited to Sadie Vimmerstedt and Johnny Mercer. In the lyrics, the singer declares that he "wants to be around" when the woman who spurned him inevitably gets her heart broken.

== Origins ==
Sadie Vimmerstedt was a 52-year-old widow and a beautician in Youngstown, Ohio, who sent Johnny Mercer an idea for the song in 1957, as well as giving Mercer the opening line ("I want to be around to pick up the pieces, when somebody breaks your heart"). She was inspired by Frank Sinatra divorcing his first wife Nancy Barbato in order to marry Ava Gardner, only to then see Gardner leave Sinatra. Not knowing exactly where to send her letter to, Vimmerstedt simply addressed it to "Johnny Mercer...Songwriter...New York, NY". The post office forwarded it to ASCAP, who in turn passed it along to Mercer, who was a member of the organization. Mercer wrote the song and agreed to share a third of the royalties and credits with Vimmerstedt. The song was published in 1962.

== Notable versions ==
Tony Bennett's 1963 recording was the first version of the song to reach the charts (number 14 on the Billboard Top 40 pop chart during a 14-week stay beginning in February 1963, number 5 easy listening in 1963). This was included on his 1963 album of that name and has appeared in several films, including The Freshman (1990). Bennett later recorded a new version of the song in a duet with Bono, and it became part of Bennett's album Duets: An American Classic (2006).

Many other singers have covered the song, including:

- Aretha Franklin - for her album Laughing on the Outside (1963)
- Dinah Washington - for the album Dinah '63 (1963)
- Patti Page - Say Wonderful Things (1963)
- Perry Como - The Songs I Love (1963)
- Frank Sinatra - It Might as Well Be Swing (1964)
- Bobby Darin - Venice Blue (1965)
- Terri Gibbs for her 1981 album I'm a Lady, later released as a single that reached number 38 on the country chart.
- Michael Bublé - Nobody but Me (2016)
