= The Transformers: Hearts of Steel =

Comic book series

- Issue #1 cover by Guido Guidi

Publication information
- Publisher: IDW Publishing
- Schedule: Monthly
- Format: Miniseries
- Genre: Steampunk
- Publication date: June–September 2006
- No. of issues: 4
- Main character(s): Autobots, Decepticons

Creative team
- Created by: Hasbro
- Written by: Chuck Dixon
- Artist: Guido Guidi
- Colorist: Jay Fotos

The Transformers: Hearts of Steel is a comic book miniseries published by IDW Publishing. It was intended to be part of a comic book line titled The Transformers: Evolutions, following the same idea of DC Comics' Elseworlds series. Each series was to create an alternative reality: a continuity in a different time era during which the Transformers would exist. In other words, the Transformers can exist at places and at points in time that would not be possible in the current 'IDW-verse'. As of 2007, only the Hearts of Steel series was produced, which is set in the United States during the Industrial Revolution. The rest of the series was cancelled, likely due to poor sales and IDW had announced that there would be no more Evolutions series until after the 2007 movie, as Hasbro did not want to make things confusing with more alternate universe tales.

== Story ==
=== Hearts of Steel timeline ===
The story begins with the Autobots and Decepticons waging war on Earth around the time of a previous ice age. No explanation is given how they arrived on Earth, but their alternate modes are metallic fantasy beasts. The freezing temperatures and lack of energy forces both sides to take shelter and lie dormant for eons. The Autobots retreat to a cave while the Decepticons are later seen underwater.

At some point during the Industrial Revolution, noise outside their cave awakens the Autobot Bumblebee. He ventures outside the cave to discover the planet's new dominant species — man, and that they have developed steam powered technology and the capacity to build railroads. He observes some men, featuring the famous John Henry enjoying the labor of driving spikes into the ground for a new railroad. Bumblebee changes his alternate form to be a steam-powered spike driver and helps the humans who are unaware of his true robotic nature.

Meanwhile, the Decepticons awaken and start plans to take over Earth. Starscream is acting commander while Megatron is still powered down, predictably planning to destroy him while he is inactive and defenceless. When Shockwave approaches failed inventor Tobias Muldoon to assist them with the technology of the age, the Decepticons begin their plans in earnest. The Insecticons, who transform into a combined battle train, rob a bank train to help fund the building of their base. John Henry finds out about the Decepticon train robbery and informs Bumblebee, who then tells his fellow Autobots.

Muldoon, meanwhile has realized Starscream's true intentions. Gathering support from the author Mark Twain after Ravage tries and fails to kill him, Muldoon and his friends aim to stop the Decepticons from reaching New York City and capturing an experimental electrical generator, which Starscream plans to use to destroy Megatron. Linking up with Henry and the Autobots, the heroes survive an attack from Scourge (reconfigured as a Zeppelin) and manage to divert the Decepticon train convoy into a chasm. The Autobots return to hibernation as the humans speculate on their fate.

=== Infestation 2 ===
The Hearts of Steel universe was later be play part of Infestation 2, where they fought against the Great Old Ones, who broke free from their interdimensional prison as a result of the stories of H. P. Lovecraft.

=== The X-Files: Conspiracy ===
The Hearts of Steel characters later played a role in present day during the crossover event series The X-Files: Conspiracy.

=== Hasbro Comic Book Universe ===
The Hearts of Steel would somehow appear in the Hasbro Comic Book Universe, being held prisoners by the cabal of Baron Ironblood. At this point it is revealed that the characters from the Hearts of Steel series are not from Cybertron but actually from Eukaris, one of Cybertron's lost colonies. They crash landed on Earth due to the effects of the Talisman wherein Shockwave found them and altered their memories to make them think they were the Cybertronian characters they portrayed. This allowed Shockwave to see how the Great War would play out using "copies" of the primary participants. By the time of the Second World War, only "Shockwave" and "Bumblebee" remained. After being taken in by Baron Ironblood and Garrison Kreiger, "Bumblebee" would eventually shake off his mental conditioning and return to his original identity of the Eurakian known as Centurion.

== Setting ==
=== Characters ===
The time period allows for appearances by human characters such as Mark Twain, Jules Verne and John Henry.

In the series, John Henry is a large bald man who drives spikes into the ground while laying track for the railroad. His hammering wakes up the Autobot Bumblebee who along with the rest of his squad lay deactivated deep within tunnels below the earth. Bumblebee is almost caught by John Henry until Bumblebee changes into an automated spike-driving machine. Here he is portrayed as being fearful of being replaced by modern machinery. Others featured include famous authors Mark Twain and Jules Verne, who view Muldoon's submarine. Twain later becomes a staunch ally of Muldoon after the Decepticons betray him.

Only four Autobots were mentioned by name in the series: Bumblebee, Ironhide (in the TPB when he gives his name it was changed to Sideswipe) and Optimus Prime although he did not appear, though others are recognizable as G1 Generation 1 characters, introduced as toys in 1984. The opposite is true for the Decepticons, with many being named. Others are left unnamed but are recognizable such as Ravage.

=== Alternate modes ===
In addition to their original alternate modes as fantasy beasts, the Transformers later adopt alternate modes appropriate to the era in which they awaken. As mentioned, Bumblebee becomes an automated spike-driver and the other awakened Autobots become locomotives or train cars. The Decepticons are a bit more varied, although many of them also transform into train cars. Shockwave becomes an ironclad warship. Starscream and his Seekers transform into Wright brothers-esque propeller driven aircraft. The Insecticons combine into a ramming battle train. Scourge has a huge inflatable attachment that allows him to become a zeppelin. Ravage's alternate mode appears to be an engine. One of the covers also show Squawkbox with the robot mode combining a mechanical eagle and gorilla, though they likely don't become cassettes.

=== Trade paperback ===
The trade paperback (TPB) of the story was released in December 2006. The TPB includes all the different covers used throughout the series and some additional art by series artist Guido Guidi. Of particular note is that the gallery includes unused designs for both Optimus Prime and Megatron, although neither appeared in the story. Prime was shown to transform into a train, while Megatron had two different sketches, showing that he would transform into either a cannon or a revolver.

=== Continuity ===
Writer Chuck Dixon has said that he deliberately wrote the story in such a way that it can be considered part of the Generation 1 continuity.. As only a few Transformers are awakened from hibernation during the story and all of them return to sleep at the end, it can be considered a "lost tale" that has simply not been mentioned in any other story. However "Hearts of Steel" does contradict the G1 cartoon and comic universe, at least, because Scourge appears, despite not existing in the animated continuity until after 2005 and being formed from the remains of Thundercracker, as well as the Insecticons, who according to the animated series were kept separate to the other Decepticons in Megatron's ship. This does not mean that it is out of place in the Generation 1 continuity overall, however; IDW's G1 continuity is separate from the G1 cartoon and Marvel comic universe, and does not feature Scourge as a reformatted Thundercracker (and almost certainly would not, given Galvatron being a separate entity from Megatron and the absence of Unicron in the IDWverse-until the end of First Strike).

Other inconsistencies include the fact that the comic implies that the ancient war between the Autobots and Decepticons was not waged on Cybertron, but rather on Earth. Also, the Ark, the Autobot's ship with which they fled from Cybertron and crash-landed on Earth in the G1 continuity, is entirely absent from the comic and does not appear to exist.
