= Amanda Elzy =

African-American educator

Amanda Belle Elzy (died 2004) was a pioneering African-American educator. She graduated from Rust High School in 1929 and from Rust College in 1934. She worked as Supervisor of Negro Schools in Leflore County, Mississippi, then became the first black assistant superintendent in the county, and was one of the founders of Mississippi Valley State University in the 1940s. Her sister was the singer Ruby Elzy, and their mother Emma Elzy was a teacher and prominent member of the Methodist church, in whose memory the Mississippi Conference of the United Methodist Church presents an annual Emma K. Elzy award. Emma died in 1985, aged 98. Amanda Elzy died in 2004.

Amanda Elzy High School in the Greenwood-Leflore Consolidated School District was named in her honor in 1959.
