= Mr. Broadway: Tony's Greatest Broadway Hits =

Mr. Broadway: Tony Bennett's Greatest Broadway Hits

Greatest hits album by Tony Bennett
- Released: March 1962
- Recorded: 1953–1962
- Genre: Jazz
- Label: Columbia
- Producer: Ernest Altschuler

Tony Bennett chronology
My Heart Sings (1961)	Mr. Broadway: Tony Bennett's Greatest Broadway Hits (1962)	I Left My Heart in San Francisco (1962)

Professional ratings
Review scores
Source	Rating
Allmusic	2/5 stars
The Encyclopedia of Popular Music	3/5 stars

Mr. Broadway: Tony Bennett's Greatest Broadway Hits is a 1962 album by Tony Bennett.

On November 8, 2011, Sony Music Distribution included the CD in a box set entitled The Complete Collection.

== Track listing ==
1. "Stranger In Paradise" (from the 1953 Broadway musical Kismet) (Alexander Borodin / George Forrest / Robert Wright)
2. "Just In Time" (from the 1956 Broadway musical Bells Are Ringing) (Jule Styne / Betty Comden / Adolph Green) – 2:36
3. "Lazy Afternoon" (from the 1954 Broadway musical The Golden Apple) (John Latouche / Jerome Moross)
4. "Love Look Away" (from the 1958 Broadway musical Flower Drum Song) (Richard Rodgers / Oscar Hammerstein II) – 2:45
5. "The Party's Over" (from the 1956 Broadway musical Bells Are Ringing) (Styne / Comden / Green) – 3:06
6. "You'll Never Get Away From Me" (from the 1959 musical Gyspy) (Stephen Sondheim / Styne) – 2:07
7. "Climb Ev'ry Mountain" (from the 1959 musical The Sound of Music) (Rodgers / Hammerstein II) – 2:21
8. "Begin the Beguine" (from the 1935 musical Jubilee (Cole Porter)
9. "Baby, Talk to Me" (from the 1960 musical Bye Bye Birdie) (Charles Strouse / Lee Adams)
10. "Put On a Happy Face" (from the 1960 musical Bye Bye Birdie) (Strouse / Adams)
11. "Follow Me" (from the 1960 musical Camelot) (Alan Lerner / Frederick Loewe)
12. "Comes Once in a Lifetime" (from the 1961 musical Subways Are For Sleeping) (Styne / Comden / Green)

== Personnel ==
- Tony Bennett – vocals
- Percy Faith – arranger
