= SS John Henry =

Liberty ship of WWII

History

United States
- Name: John Henry
- Namesake: John Henry
- Owner: War Shipping Administration (WSA)
- Operator: Eastern Steamship Co.
- Ordered: as type (EC2-S-C1) hull, MCE hull 45
- Awarded: 14 March 1941
- Builder: Bethlehem-Fairfield Shipyard, Baltimore, Maryland
- Cost: $1,052,507
- Yard number: 2032
- Way number: 13
- Laid down: 14 April 1942
- Launched: 18 June 1942
- Sponsored by: Mrs. F.D. Purse
- Completed: 6 July 1942
- Identification: Call sign: KFID
- Fate: Laid up in the James River Reserve Fleet, Lee Hall, Virginia, 29 September 1947; Sold for scrapping, 12 September 1972, withdrawn from fleet, 6 November 1972

General characteristics
- Class & type: Liberty ship; type EC2-S-C1, standard
- Tonnage: 10,865 LT DWT; 7,176 GRT
- Displacement: 3,380 long tons (3,434 t) (light); 14,245 long tons (14,474 t) (max)
- Length: 441 feet 6 inches (135 m) oa; 416 feet (127 m) pp; 427 feet (130 m) lwl
- Beam: 57 feet (17 m)
- Draft: 27 ft 9.25 in (8.4646 m)
- Installed power: 2 × Oil fired 450 °F (232 °C) boilers, operating at 220 psi (1,500 kPa); 2,500 hp (1,900 kW)
- Propulsion: 1 × triple-expansion steam engine, (manufactured by Worthington Pump & Machinery Corp, Harrison, New Jersey); 1 × screw propeller
- Speed: 11.5 knots (21.3 km/h; 13.2 mph)
- Capacity: 562,608 cubic feet (15,931 m^{3}) (grain); 499,573 cubic feet (14,146 m^{3}) (bale)
- Complement: 38–62 USMM; 21–40 USNAG
- Armament: Varied by ship; Bow-mounted 3-inch (76 mm)/50-caliber gun; Stern-mounted 4-inch (102 mm)/50-caliber gun; 2–8 × single 20-millimeter (0.79 in) Oerlikon anti-aircraft (AA) cannons and/or, 2–8 × 37-millimeter (1.46 in) M1 AA guns

SS John Henry was a Liberty ship built in the United States during World War II. She was named after John Henry, the eighth Governor of Maryland and member of the United States Senate.

== Construction ==
John Henry was laid down on 14 April 1942, under a Maritime Commission (MARCOM) contract, MCE hull 45, by the Bethlehem-Fairfield Shipyard, Baltimore, Maryland; she was sponsored by Mrs. F.D. Purse, the wife of the MARCOM district marine surveyor of Baltimore, and was launched on 18 June 1942.

== History ==
John Henry was allocated to Eastern Steamship Co., on 6 July 1942. On 29 September 1947, she was laid up in the James River Reserve Fleet, Lee Hall, Virginia. On 23 May 1954, she was withdrawn from the fleet to be loaded with grain under the "Grain Program 1954", she returned loaded on 30 May 1954. On 24 June 1960, John Henry was withdrawn to be unload, she returned empty on 11 July 1960. On 27 October 1960, she was withdrawn from the fleet to be loaded with grain under the "Grain Program 1960", she returned loaded on 9 November 1960. On 22 April 1963, John Henry was withdrawn to be unload, she returned empty on 2 May 1963. She was sold for scrapping on 12 September 1972, to Isaac Varela, for $80,007. She was removed from the fleet, 6 November 1972.

== Bibliography ==
- "Bethlehem-Fairfield, Baltimore MD". www.ShipbuildingHistory.com. 14 August 2008.
- Maritime Administration. "John Henry". Ship History Database Vessel Status Card. U.S. Department of Transportation, Maritime Administration.
- Davies, James (May 2004). "Specifications (As-Built)" (PDF). p. 23.
- "SS John Henry".
