= John Henry (musical) =

- Original Broadway Playbill
- Music: Jacques Wolfe
- Lyrics: Roark Bradford
- Book: Roark Bradford
- Basis: Roark Bradford's novel John Henry
- Productions: 1940 Broadway

John Henry was a 1940 original Broadway musical based on the 1931 novel John Henry by Roark Bradford. The libretto was written by Bradford with music composed by Jacques Wolfe.

Paul Robeson starred in the title role with Ruby Elzy as Julie Anne. Other prominent members of the cast included Joseph Attles, Maude Simmons, Josh White, Musa Williams, and Bayard Rustin.

The show played at the 44th Street Theatre in New York City from January 10, 1940, to January 15, 1940.

== Songs ==
Act I

- "I'm Singing About a Man" – Blind Lemon
- "How Come I'm Born Wid a Hook in My Hand" – John Henry
- "All the People on the Levee" – John Henry and Chorus
- "Ya Gotta Bend Down" – Blind Lemon and Chorus
- "How Come I'm Born Wid a Hook in My Hand (Reprise)" – John Henry
- "Coonjine" – Chorus
- "Jaybird" – Old Aunt Dinah and John Henry
- "Got a Head Like a Rock" – John Henry
- "Whiffer's Song" – Blind Lemon
- "Stingaree Song" – Poor Selma
- "Bad, Bad Stacker Lee" – Man Named Sam
- "Careless Love" – Julie Anne
- "I've Trampled All Over" – Julie Anne and John Henry
- "Caught Ole Blue" – Blind Lemon and Chorus
- "Old John Henry/Po' Lil' Frenchie" – John Henry and Men
- "Workin' on de Railroad" – John Henry and Men
- "High Ballin'" – Chorus

Act II

- "Where Did You Get Dem High Heeled Shoes?" – Blind Lemon
- "Let De Sun Sink Down" – Carrie and Chorus
- "Ship of Zion" – Chorus
- "No Bottom" – Chorus
- "Lullaby" – Julie Anne
- "Take Me a Drink of Whiskey" – Man Named Sam and Ruby
- "Sundown in My Soul" – John Henry
- "I'm Gonna Git Down on My Knees" – Hell Buster and Chorus
- "I Want Jesus to Walk With Me" – Hell Buster and Chorus
- "I'm Born in the Country" – John Henry
- "Now You Talks Mighty Big in the Country" – Man Named Sam and Chorus
- "So Stand Back, All You Bullies" – John Henry
- "Ship of Zion (Reprise)" – Chorus
- "I Don't Care Where They Buried My Body" – Chorus
- "He Went to the East" – Chorus
