= Samuel W. Lewis (politician) =

American politician

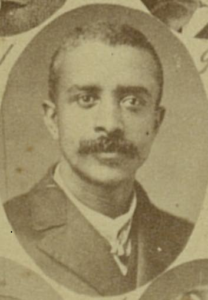

Samuel W. Lewis (born c. 1845) was a Canadian-born American schoolteacher and state legislator in Mississippi. He represented Madison County, Mississippi in the Mississippi House of Representatives from 1884-1885.

He was born in Canada circa 1845 and arrived in the U.S. around 1868 and naturalized as a U.S. citizen September 14, 1876. He had a wife called Ida and they had three children. He was a Republican.

He and other “colored” House members made vigorous protest of accusation of corruption against them from the Watchman newspaper.

He was chairman of the Republican Executive Committee for the Seventh District.

== See also ==
- African American officeholders from the end of the Civil War until before 1900
