= Dennis Day =

American actor, comedian and singer (1916–1988)

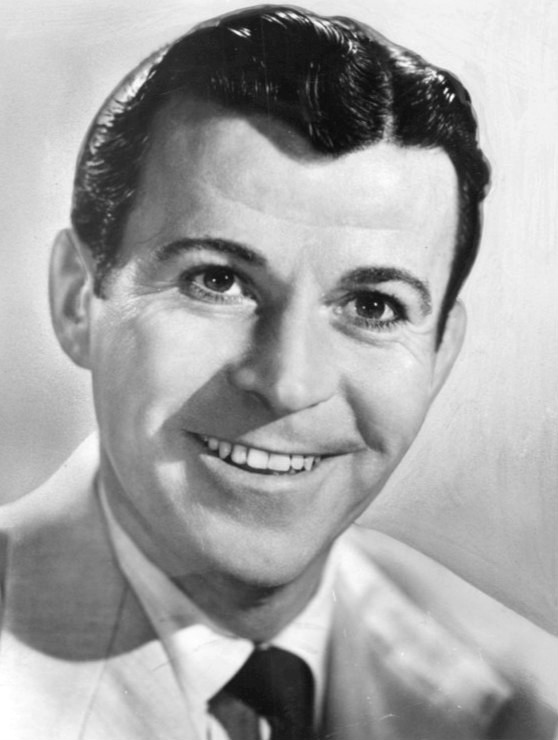
- Day in 1960
- Born: Owen Patrick Eugene McNulty; May 21, 1916; Throggs Neck, New York, U.S.
- Died: June 22, 1988 (aged 72); Los Angeles, California, U.S.
- Resting place: Holy Cross Cemetery
- Occupations: Actor; comedian; singer
- Years active: 1939–1988
- Spouse: Peggy Almquist (m. 1948)
- Children: 10
- Relatives: Ann Blyth (sister-in-law)
- Education: Manhattan College
- Presenting career
- Show: The Jack Benny Program
- Stations: NBC, CBS

Dennis Day (born Owen Patrick Eugene McNulty; May 21, 1916 – June 22, 1988) was an American tenor singer, actor, and comedian. He was best-known for his longtime stint as the singer-in-residence in Jack Benny's radio and television shows.

== Early life ==
Day was born and raised in the Throggs Neck Clason Point section of Bronx in New York City, the second of five children born to Irish immigrants Patrick McNulty and Mary (née Grady) McNulty. His father was a factory electric power engineer. Day graduated from the Cathedral Preparatory School and Seminary and attended Manhattan College in the Bronx, where he sang in the glee club.

In 1939 Gene McNulty, as Day was then known, sang on network radio with bandleader Larry Clinton. The Clinton broadcasts were aimed at the collegiate audience, and were often broadcast from a college campus. The 23-year-old McNulty won an audience poll as a favorite vocalist.

== Radio ==
Day appeared for the first time on Jack Benny's radio show on October 8, 1939, taking the place of another tenor, Kenny Baker. He remained associated with Benny's radio and television programs until Benny's death in 1974. He was introduced (with actress Verna Felton playing his overbearing mother) as a young (19-year-old), naive boy singer – a character he kept through his whole career, although his character eventually "aged" a few years.

Mary Livingstone, Benny's wife, brought the singer to Benny's attention after hearing Day on the radio during a visit to New York. She took a recording of Day's singing to Benny, who then went to New York to audition Day. The audition resulted in Day's role on the Benny program.

Day's first recorded song was "Goodnight My Beautiful".

Besides singing, Day was a mimic. On both the Benny program and his own show, Day performed impressions of various celebrities of the era, including Ronald Colman, Jimmy Durante, and James Stewart, as well as many dialects. Day was also a good whistler, singing and whistling as Johnny Appleseed in the animated film Melody Time.

Sam Berman's caricature of Dennis Day for a 1947 NBC promotional book

From 1944 to March 1946 he served in the U.S. Navy as a lieutenant. While in service he was temporarily replaced on the Benny radio program by fellow tenor Larry Stevens. On his return to civilian life, he continued to work with Benny while also starring on his own NBC show, A Day in the Life of Dennis Day (1946–1951). On Benny's show, Day's having two programs in comparison to Benny's one was the subject of numerous jokes and gags, usually revolving around Day rubbing Benny's, and sometimes other cast members' and guest stars' noses, in that fact (e.g., "Dennis, why do you have two horns on your bicycle?" "Why shouldn't I? I've got two shows!"). His last radio series was a comedy and variety show that aired on NBC's Sunday afternoon schedule during the 1954–55 season.

== A Day in the Life of Dennis Day ==
When Day got his own radio sitcom, he continued to play essentially the same character that he originated on Benny's program. For this series, though, Day lived in the fictional town of Weaverville. He stayed at a boarding house run by Clara Anderson, usually played by Bea Benaderet. Her henpecked husband, Herbert Anderson, was portrayed by Dink Trout. Day was engaged to their daughter Mildred, played by Barbara Eiler. His character worked at Willoughby's Drug Store, where his boss was Mr. Willoughby. The show was sponsored by Colgate-Palmolive. Verne Smith was the announcer, while music was provided by Bud Dant and his orchestra. The format of the show began with a song by Day, followed by the first half of the plot, a second song by Day, the rest of the plot, and then a third song by Day to finish the episode. Episodes can be heard regularly on the Sirius XM Radio Classics Channel.

== Television ==
An attempt was made to adapt A Day in the Life of Dennis Day as an NBC filmed series (Sam Berman's caricature of Dennis was used in the opening and closing titles), produced by Jerry Fairbanks for Dennis' sponsor, Colgate-Palmolive, featuring the original radio cast, but got no farther than an unaired 1949 pilot episode. In late 1950, a sample kinescope was produced by Colgate and their ad agency showcasing Dennis as host of a projected "live" comedy/variety series (The Dennis Day Show) for CBS, but that, too, went unsold. He continued to appear as a regular cast member when The Jack Benny Program became a TV series, staying with the show until it ended in 1965.

Eventually, his own TV series, The Dennis Day Show (or The RCA Victor Show), was first telecast on NBC on February 8, 1952, and then in the 1953–1954 season. On this show, Day played a less-fictionalized version of himself, using his natural voice and behaving as an adult who was considerably more mature than his Benny character.

Between 1952 and 1978, Day made numerous TV appearances as a singer and actor (such as NBC's The Gisele MacKenzie Show, ABC's The Bing Crosby Show and Alfred Hitchcock Presents) and voice for animation. Day appeared as the "Mystery Guest" on the January 23, 1955 episode of What's My Line?. Day was correctly identified by panelist Dorothy Kilgallen.

In 1957 Day played himself in episode seven, season two of the briefly aired (1957–1958) situation comedy called Date with the Angels in which, on the way to a recording studio, Day's car breaks down in front of Vicki Angel's (Betty White) home. While waiting for the automobile service to arrive, he does a few imitations (including Elvis), sings a song, and does a duet with Vicki. The episode, which began in Sardi's restaurant, included brief appearances of Liberace and Hugh O'Brian. While numerous stars appeared in the series without credit, all three (Day, Liberace, O'Brian) guest stars appear in the credits on that episode.

He also appeared in Date with the Angels – season one, episode 13, as himself; it aired on Friday at 9:30 pm, October 25, 1957, on ABC. Some records show it was episode 19, titled "Star Struck".

During the final season of The Jack Benny Program (1964–65), Day was nearly 49 years old, although Benny was still delivering such lines as "That crazy kid drives me nuts ..."

His last televised work with Benny was in 1970, when they appeared in a public-service announcement together to promote savings and loans. This was shortly after the whole cast and crew of The Jack Benny Show had joined for Jack Benny's Twentieth Anniversary Special.

He starred as railroad employee Jason Barnes in the 1962 Death Valley Days TV episode "Way Station". In 1972, he co-starred with June Allyson and Judy Canova in the first national tour of the Broadway musical No, No, Nanette.

In 1976 Day was the voice of Parson Brown in the Rankin-Bass production Frosty's Winter Wonderland and again worked with them in 1978, when he voiced Fred in The Stingiest Man in Town, which was their animated version of Charles Dickens' novel A Christmas Carol.

Day was given stars on the Hollywood Walk of Fame for radio and television in 1960.

== Film ==
Although his career was mainly radio- and TV-based, Day also appeared in a few films. These included Buck Benny Rides Again (1940) opposite Jack Benny, Sleepy Lagoon (1943), Music in Manhattan (1944), I'll Get By (1950), Golden Girl (1951), The Girl Next Door (1953), and Won Ton Ton, the Dog Who Saved Hollywood (1976) as a singing telegraph man. For the soundtrack of My Wild Irish Rose (1947), a biopic about Chauncey Olcott, Day provided the singing voice to the acting of Dennis Morgan. Day also provided the voices of Johnny Appleseed, Johnny's Angel, and the Old Settler in the "Johnny Appleseed" segment in Walt Disney's Melody Time (1948).

== Personal life and death ==
Day, a devout Catholic, was married to Margaret Ellen Almquist (1923–2013) from 1948 until his death. Together they had ten children. One of his brothers, physician James McNulty, was married to actress Ann Blyth.

In 1987 Day was diagnosed with amyotrophic lateral sclerosis (ALS), an incurable neurodegenerative disease. His condition worsened following a serious fall in March 1988, and he died in June 1988 at the age of 72.

Day supported Barry Goldwater in the 1964 United States presidential election.

== Discography (partial) ==
- Dennis Day Sings! (1945, Capitol Records)
- Shamrock Melodies (1946, RCA Victor)
- Dennis Day sings songs from WARNER BROS. technicolor production "My Wild Irish Rose" (1948, RCA Victor) (No. 4 US)
- The Boy Who Sang For The King (1948, RCA Victor)
- From Walt Disney's "Melody Time" – Johnny Appleseed – All Voices by Dennis Day (1949, RCA/Camden)
- Dennis Day Sings Christmas Is for the Family (1957, Design)
- At Hollywood's Moulin Rouge (1957, Masterseal)
- That's an Irish Lullaby (1959, RCA)
- "The Story of Johnny Appleseed" Cricketone Chorus & Orchestra and Playhour Players (1959, Pickwick International K.M. Corporation)
- Walt Disney's Snow White and the Seven Dwarfs (1960, RCA/Camden)
- "Camp St. Malo Sings" Dennis Day with the Cathedral Men and Boys Vested Choir (1961, RCA)
- Shillelaghs and Shamrocks (1963, Reprise)
- Dennis Day Narrates Johnny Appleseed (1963, Bellflower)
- Walt Disney Presents Dennis Day in the Story of Johnny Appleseed (1964, Disneyland)
- White Christmas (1965, Design) [reissue of Christmas Is for the Family]
- My Wild Irish Rose (1966, RCA Camden) [reissue of earlier RCA Victor recordings]
- Clancy Lowered the Boom (1947 RCA Victor single)
- Dear Hearts and Gentle People (1949 RCA Victor single)
- Christmas in Killarney (1950 RCA Victor single)

== Selected filmography ==
- Alfred Hitchcock Presents (1959) (Season 4 Episode 26: "Cheap is Cheap") as Alexander Gifford
- The Lucy Show (1967) (Season 6 Episode 7: "Little Old Lucy") as Cornelius Heatherington, Jr.
