= Ruby Elzy =

American opera singer

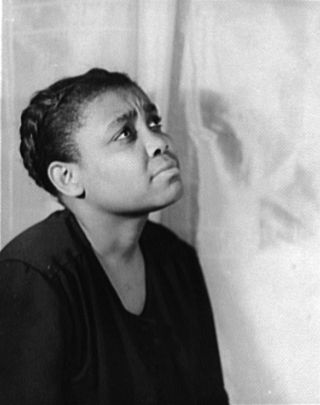
Ruby Elzy in 1935. Photo by Carl Van Vechten.

Ruby Pearl Elzy (February 20, 1908 – June 26, 1943) was an American operatic soprano. She originated the role of Serena in George Gershwin's opera Porgy and Bess.

== Family and early life ==
Elzy was born in Pontotoc, Mississippi, and educated at Rust College, the Ohio State University (graduating in 1930). She received a fellowship from the Rosenwald Fund which enabled her to go East and study at the Juilliard School (graduating in 1934).At Juilliard she was a pupil of Lucia Dunham. Her sister Amanda Elzy (died 2004) was a prominent educator after whom Amanda Elzy High School in Greenwood, Mississippi is named. Their mother Emma Elzy (died 1985, aged 98) was a teacher and prominent member of the Methodist church, in whose memory the Mississippi Conference of the United Methodist Church presents an annual Emma K. Elzy award. Ruby had two sisters, Amanda and Beatrice Wayne and one brother, Robert. Their father Charlie abandoned the family when Ruby was five.

== Career ==
Elzy entertained at the White House, December 15, 1937, for First Lady Eleanor Roosevelt's luncheon for the wives of U.S. Supreme Court Justices. She appeared on Broadway in the play Brown Sugar (1937) and the musical John Henry (1940). She also worked in films, on radio and on the concert stage. She appeared with Paul Robeson in the 1933 film The Emperor Jones, and also with Bing Crosby and Mary Martin in Birth of the Blues, though neither of these were starring roles. She sang at Harlem's Apollo Theater and in the Hollywood Bowl.

Elzy created the role of Serena in George Gershwin's folk opera Porgy and Bess and performed in it more than eight hundred times. Serena sings the heart-wrenching soprano aria and lament "My Man's Gone Now" after her husband Robbin is murdered during a game of craps. But fellow cast member and lead soprano Anne Brown (who occupied the role of Bess) and not Elzy is actually heard singing the aria on the 1940 original cast album of selections from Porgy and Bess. Fortunately, Elzy sang the demanding aria on the 1937 CD release of the Gershwin Memorial Concert that took place at the Hollywood Bowl three months after the composer's death.

In 1940, she was chosen by composer Harold Arlen to record the world premiere of his original suite of Negro spirituals, "Reverend Johnson's Dream", which would be her only commercial recording. During the same year Ruby married Jack Carr, an actor/singer who appeared on stage with her in "Porgy and Bess". The marriage lasted until her death.

Just as Elzy was about to star in the title role of Giuseppe Verdi's Aida and one week after her final performance as Serena, Ruby Elzy died in Detroit, following surgery to remove a benign tumor. She was aged 35.

In 2006, Elzy's biographer, David E. Weaver, produced a first-ever CD compilation of Elzy, featuring the singer in twenty rare recorded and broadcast performances. The CD, entitled Ruby Elzy in Song, was released on the Cambria label.

== Selected filmography ==
- The Emperor Jones (1933) as Dolly
- Birth of the Blues (1941)
