= Clement Wood =

American writer and lawyer (1888–1950)

Clement Richardson Wood (September 1, 1888 – October 26, 1950) was an American writer, lawyer and political activist.

He graduated from the University of Alabama in 1909 and received his law degree from Yale in 1911.

Wood's second marriage was to Gloria Goddard, who wrote the Susan Merton series of adventures under the pen name "Louise Logan." He also had at least one son, John Thornton Wood.

== Writing career ==
Wood mainly wrote poetry. He also wrote Tom Sawyer Grows Up, a sequel to Mark Twain's work.

He appeared frequently in pulp magazines, in titles as diverse as Telling Tales, Gangster Stories, Flynn's, and Ace-High Magazine. His story "The Coffin" was included in The Best Short Stories of 1922.

In 1929, he wrote the biography, Bernarr Macfadden: A Study in Success, in aid of Macfadden's political aspirations.

== Politics ==
Wood was a member of the Socialist Party of America and ran for mayor of Birmingham in 1913 as the party's nominee. He was also endorsed by the Birmingham Labor Advocate and Birmingham Trades Council. Wood lost to the Democratic Party candidate by 10%.

He was a member and lecturer of the American Association for the Advancement of Atheism.
