= Frank Scott (musician) =

American musician

Francis Scott (July 21, 1921 – October 5, 1995) was an American musician and arranger that was a member of the Lawrence Welk orchestra. His instruments were the piano and the harpsichord.

== Biography ==
Francis Scott, Jr was born in Fargo, North Dakota. He was the youngest of three sons of Frank Roy Scott, Sr. and Alice Wilson Scott. He first took up the piano at age eight, and by the time he was twelve, he led his first band and started to arrange songs. He originally attended North Dakota Agricultural College after high school, but after a year he left when he decided to pursue a career in music. He was the music director at radio station WDAY in Fargo from 1944 to 1956 where he scored over 2,500 arrangements for the station while composing music for community theater groups and conducting local ice shows.

In 1956, bandleader Lawrence Welk asked him to join his orchestra and his nationwide television show. He appeared on The Lawrence Welk Show playing piano and harpsichord during his tenure on the show until 1969, when he was replaced by the late Bob Smale. He also worked behind the scenes of the Welk show as an arranger, assisted the production staff and furnished programming ideas. Scott also arranged thousands of songs and recorded albums in his own right for Coral and Dot Records. He left the show and then moved back to Fargo with his wife, where he continued to work in music, organized a big band, and taught a course at North Dakota State University for a year plus continued to arrange music.

By the late 1970s, he moved back to California and formed his own orchestra, which he led until he died in October 1995. By that time, he lived in Palm Desert and had arranged more than seven thousand songs in his entire career.

== Personal life ==
Scott was married to his first wife, Janette Daniels Scott from 1940 until her death in 1979; they had four children, Douglas, Sally, Todd and Frank. His second wife, Audrey Roseland Scott (1924-2008), worked for Scott when they were at WDAY in Fargo during the 1940s. They were married from 1993 until his death two years later.
