= 1954 in jazz =

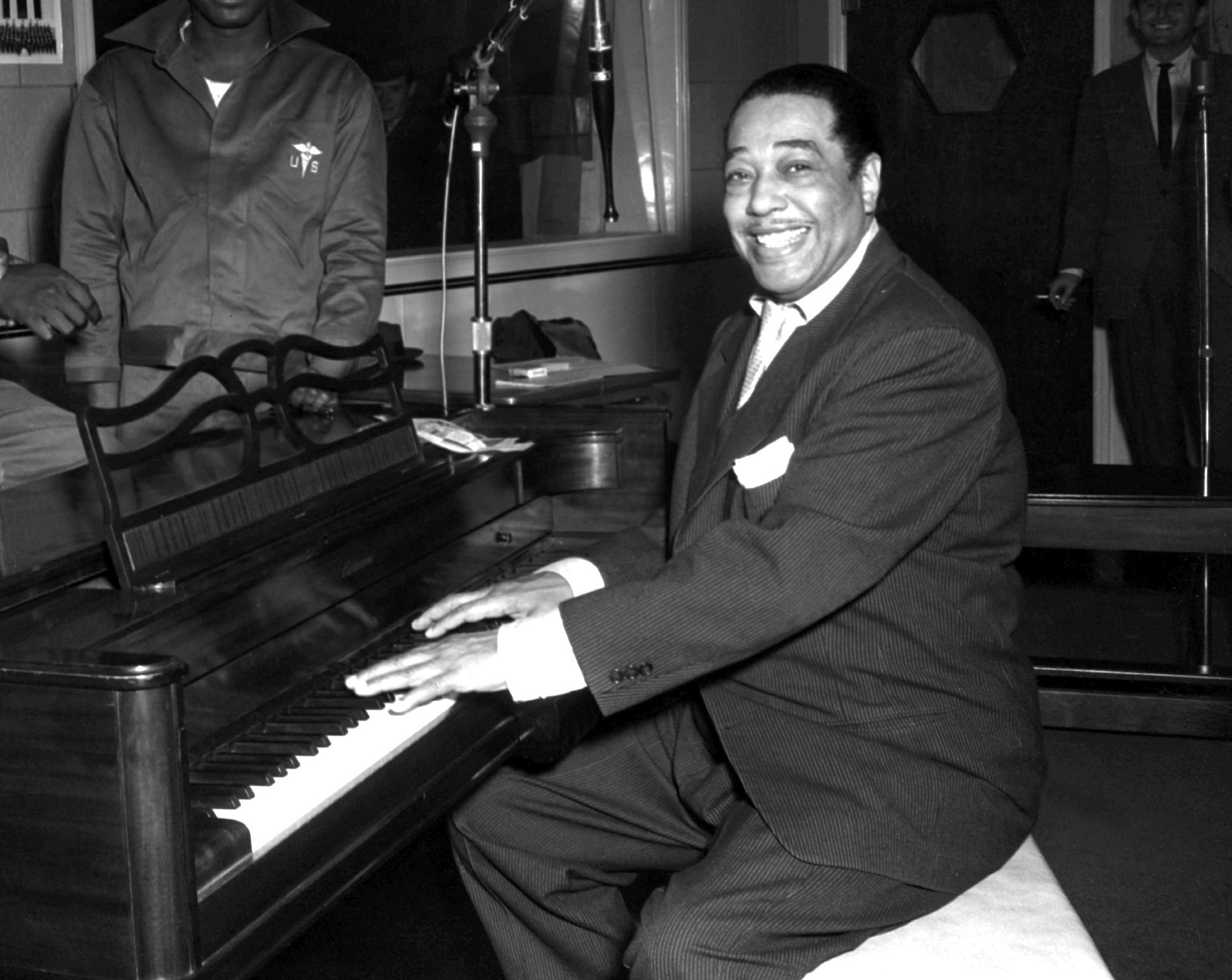
- Duke Ellington at the KFG Radio Studio, November 1954
- Decade: 1950s in jazz
- Music: 1954 in music
- Standards: List of post-1950 jazz standards
- See also: 1953 in jazz – 1955 in jazz

This is a timeline documenting events of Jazz in the year 1954.

== Events ==
=== July ===
- 17 – The very first Newport Jazz Festival started in Newport, Rhode Island (July 17 – 18).
  - The 1st day featured Dizzy Gillespie Quintet, Billie Holiday, and Oscar Peterson
  - The 2nd day featured Ella Fitzgerald, Gene Krupa Trio, and Erroll Garner

=== November ===
- 8 – Following the release of Jazz Goes to College, Dave Brubeck is featured on the cover of Time magazine, with the accompanying article describing Brubeck as "the most exciting new jazz artist at work today".

== Album releases ==
- Dave Brubeck Quartet: Jazz Goes to College
- Sarah Vaughan: Sarah Vaughan
- Chet Baker: Chet Baker Sings
- Chet Baker: Sextet
- Chris Connor: Chris Connor Sings Lullabys of Birdland
- Chris Connor: Chris Connor Sings Lullabys for Lovers
- Tal Farlow: The Tal Farlow Quartet
- Tal Farlow: The Tal Farlow Album
- John Serry Sr.: RCA Thesaurus
- Stan Kenton: Kenton Showcase

== Deaths ==
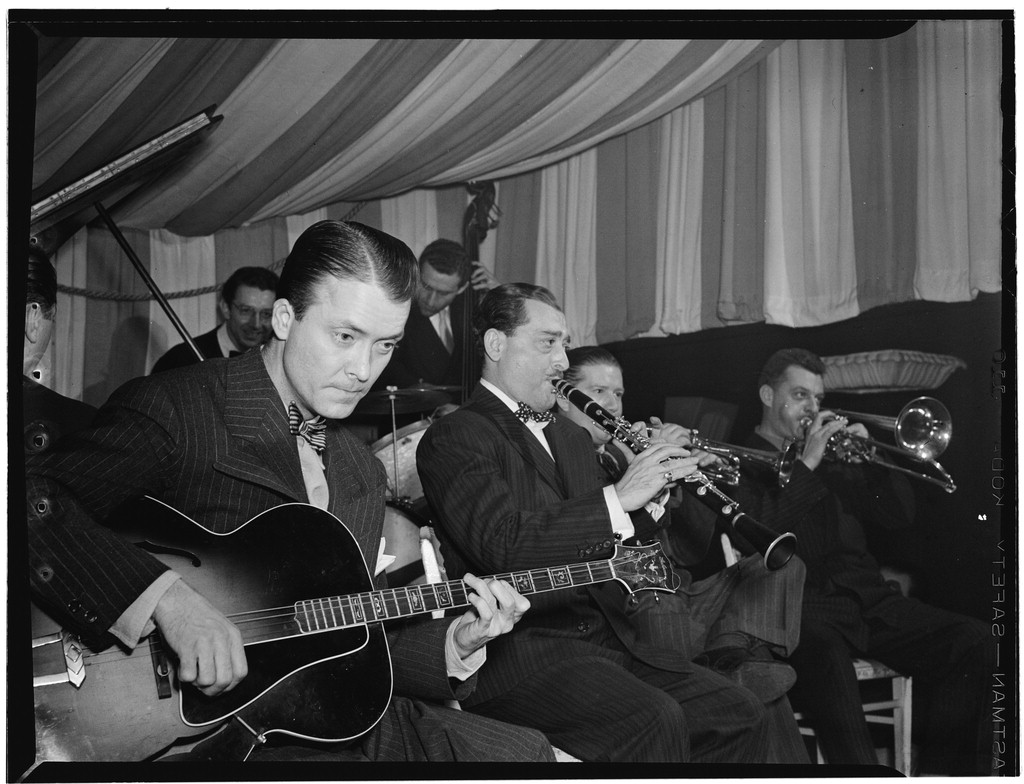
Eddie Condon, Tony Parenti, Wild Bill Davison, Brad Gowans, Jack Lesberg, and Freddie Ohms, Eddie Condon's, New York

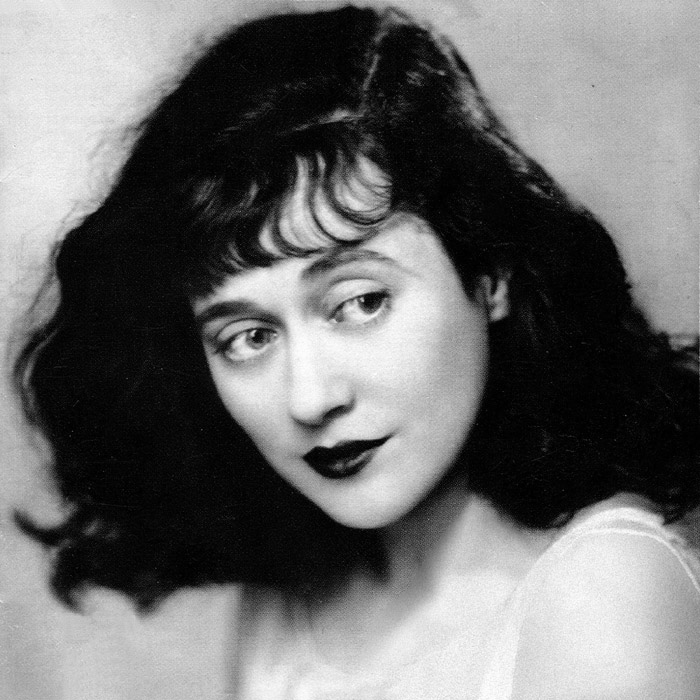
Lee Morse c. 1930

February

- 7 – Alfred Burt, American composer and trumpeter (born 1920).

March

- 11 – William Frank Newton, American trumpeter (born 1906).

April

- 14 – Lil Green, American singer and songwriter (born 1919).

May

- 31 – Garland Wilson, American pianist (born 1909).

September

- 8 – Brad Gowans, American trombonist and reedist (born 1903).

November

- 5 – Hot Lips Page, American trumpeter, singer, and bandleader (born 1908).
- 29 – Dink Johnson, dixieland pianist, clarinetist, and drummer (born 1892).

December

- 7 – Austin Wylie, American bandleader (born 1893).
- 15 – Papa Celestin, American jazz bandleader, trumpeter, cornetist, and vocalist (born 1884).
- 16 – Lee Morse, American singer and songwriter (born 1897).

Unknown date

- Rudy Williams, American jazz alto saxophonist (born 1909).

== Births ==
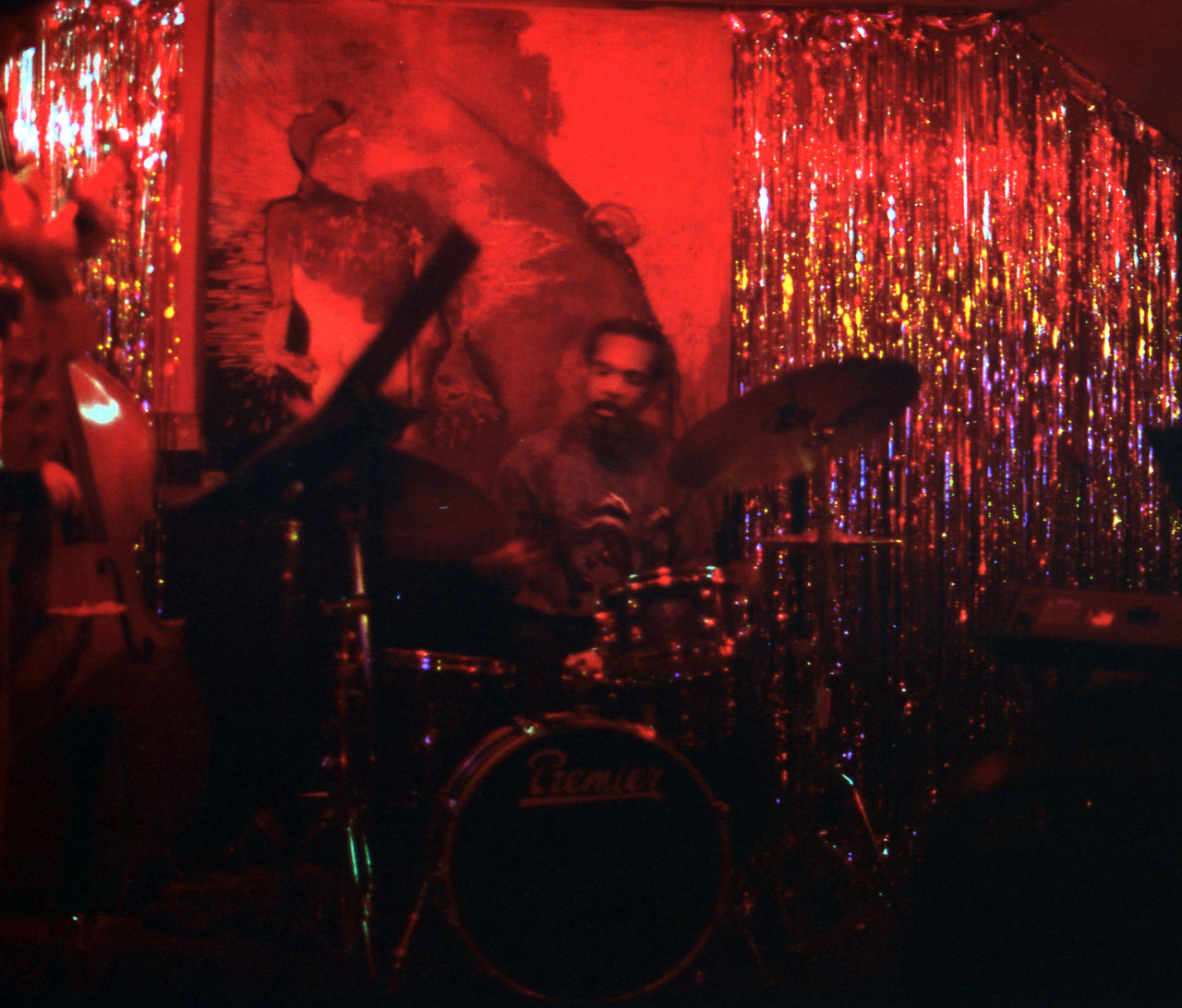
Don Mumford in 2002.

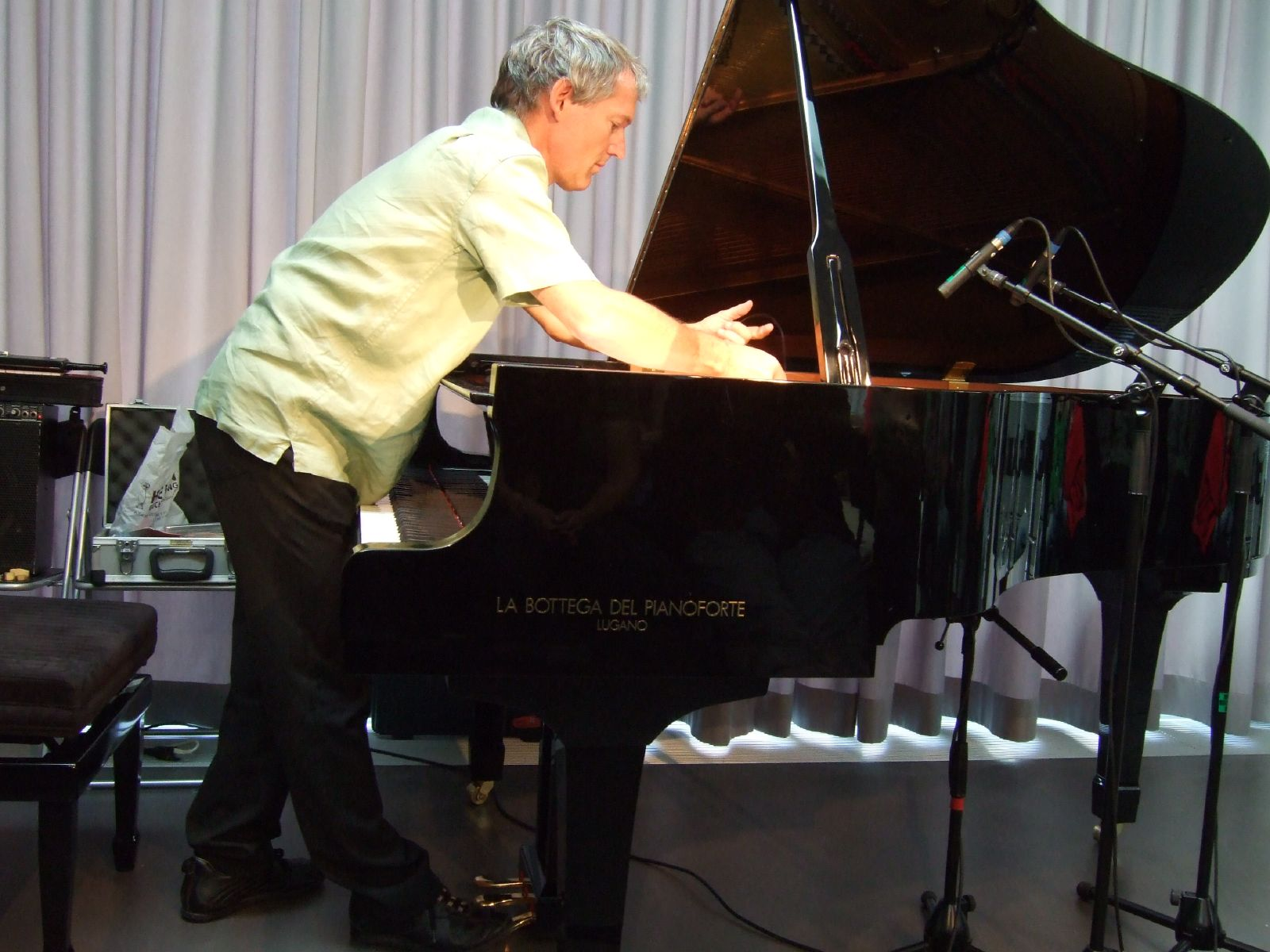
John Wolf Brennan at the 2010 Jazz Festival Willisau.

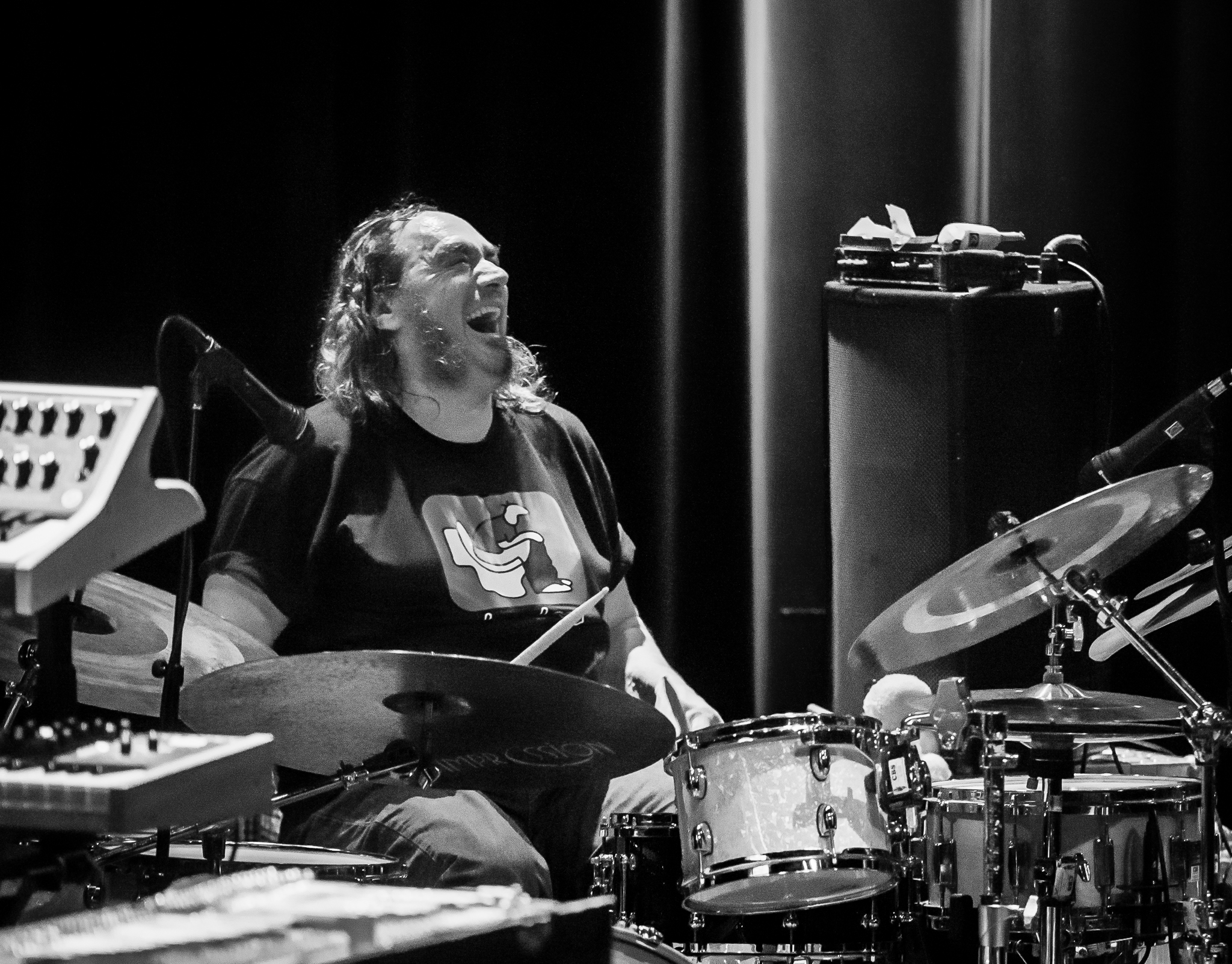
Paolo Vinaccia, Arendal Sessions.

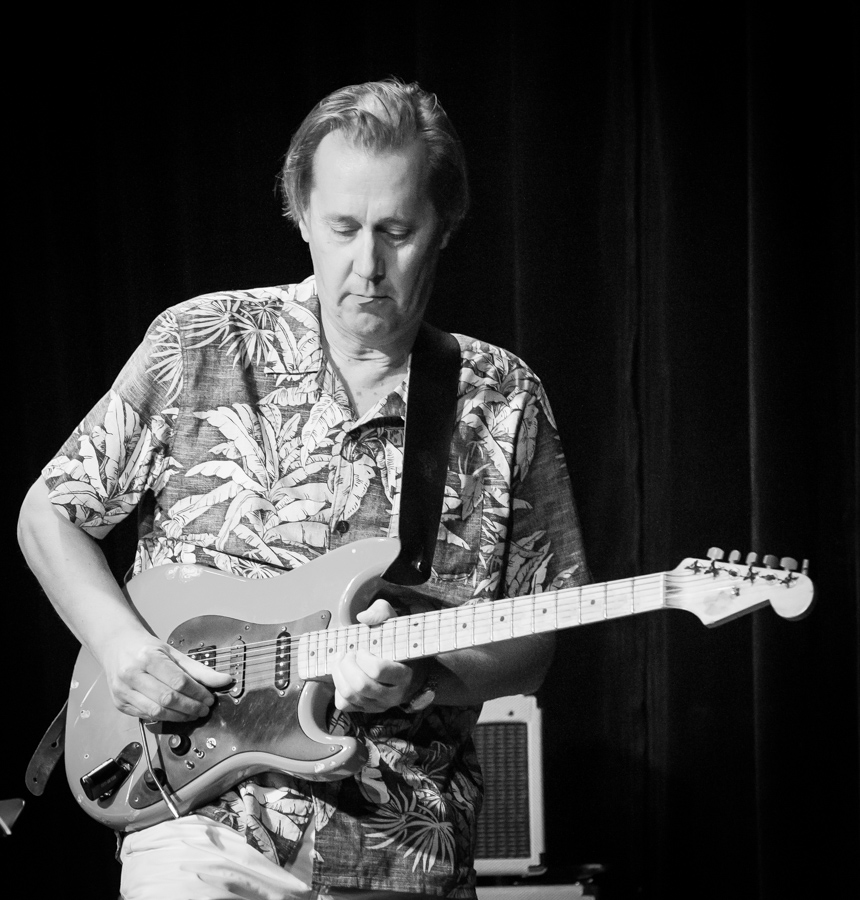
Knut Værnes at Victoria, during the 2016 Oslo Jazzfestival.

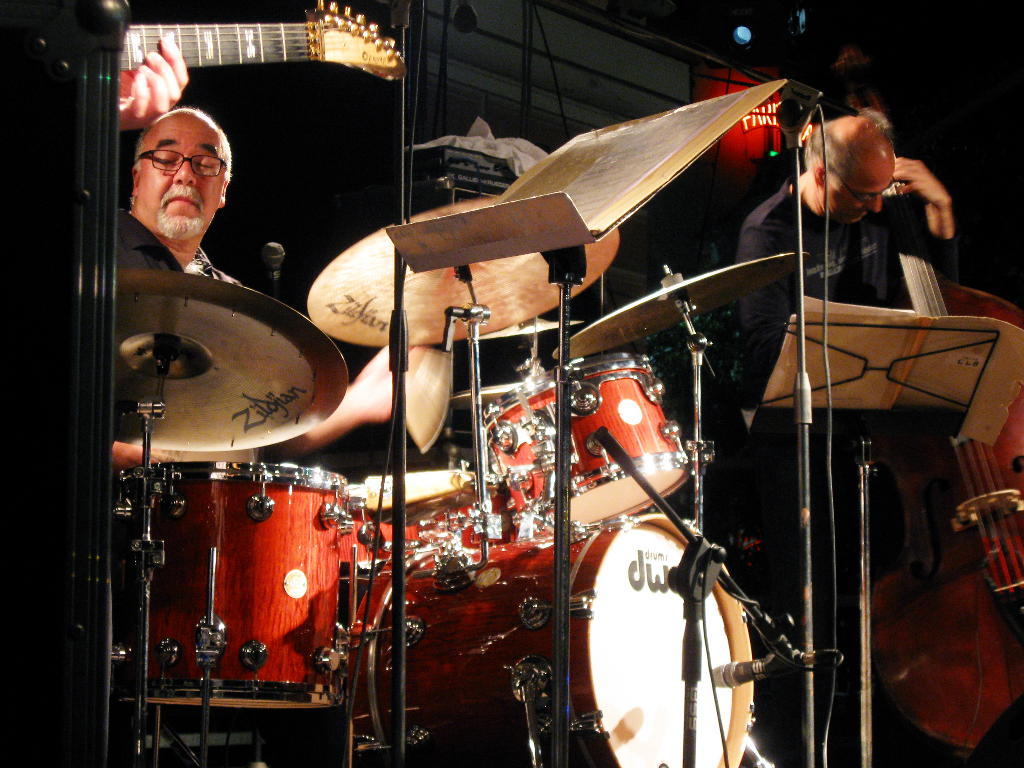
Peter Erskine in 2008.

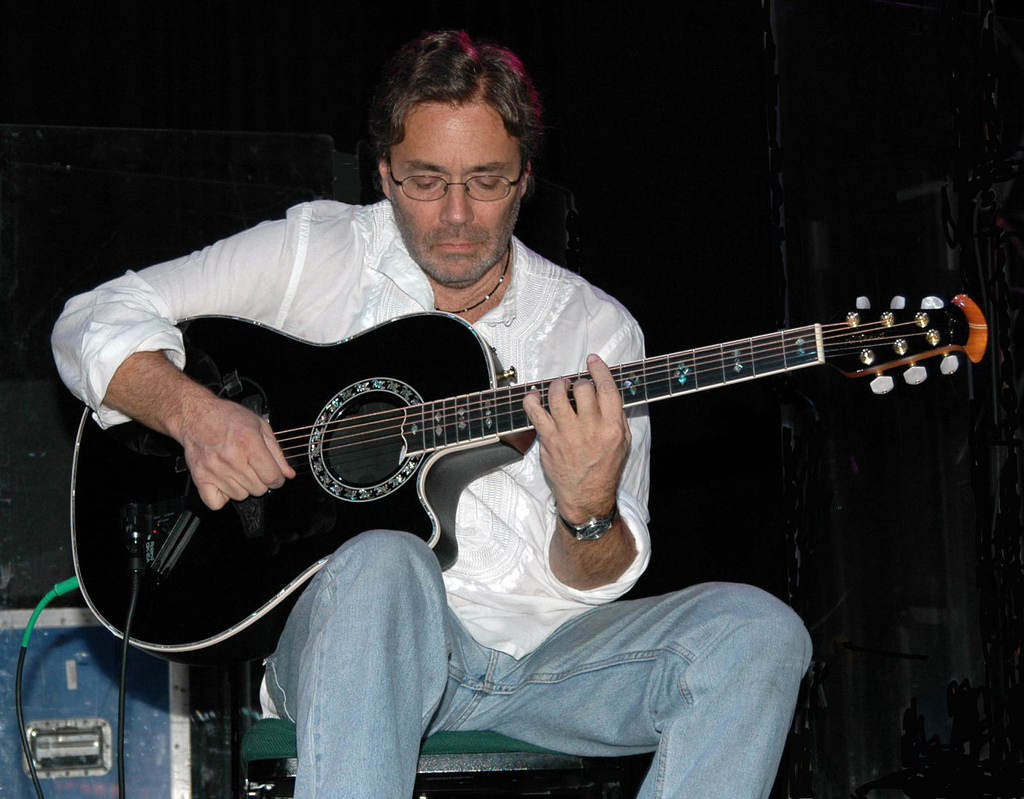
Al Di Meola in 2006.

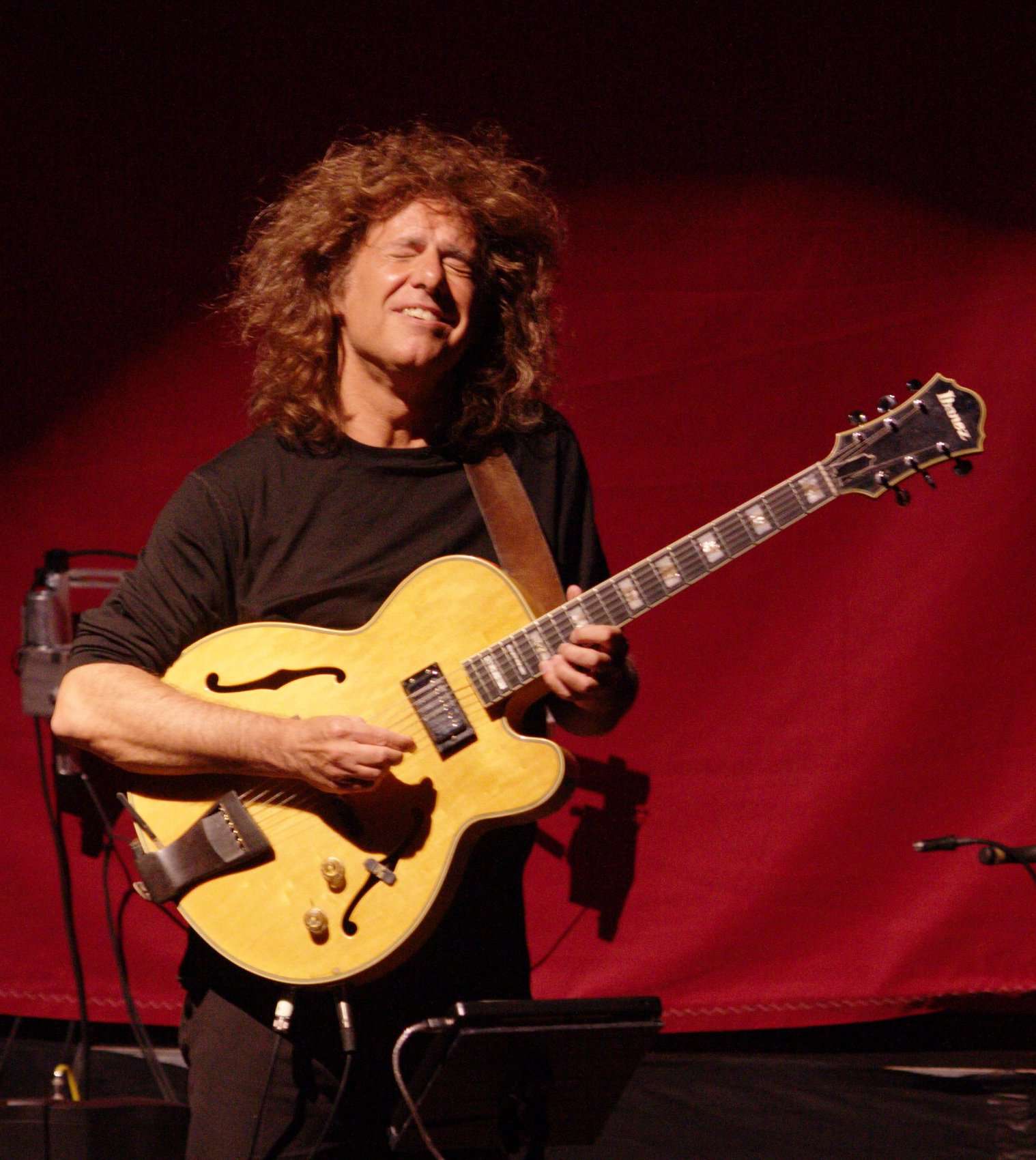
Pat Metheny in 2010.

January

- 14 – Gunnar Andreas Berg, Norwegian guitarist, music teacher, and record label manager.
- 18 – Tina Marsh, American vocalist and composer (died 2009).
- 20 – Steve Rochinski, American guitarist and teacher.
- 23 – David Bloom, American guitarist, flautist, and composer.
- 28 – Henry Johnson, American guitarist.

February

- 9 – Don Mumford, American drummer (died 2007).
- 13 – John Wolf Brennan, Irish pianist, organist, melodica player.
- 16
  - Jeff Clayton, American alto saxophonist and flautist.
  - Torbjørn Sunde, Norwegian trombonist, composer, and band leader.

March

- 1 – Carles Benavent, Spanish bassist.
- 4 – Ricky Ford, American tenor saxophonist.
- 11
  - Jon Jang, American pianist, composer, and bandleader.
  - Judy Niemack, American vocalist.
- 13 – Simon James, English guitarist, Acoustic Alchemy.
- 14 – Nick Webb, English guitarist and composer, Acoustic Alchemy (died 1998).
- 16 – Brian Torff, American upright bassist and composer.
- 18
  - Andy Narell, American steelpan player and composer.
  - Harry Sokal, Austrian jazz saxophonist.
- 21 – Haakon Graf, Norwegian keyboardist.
- 24
  - Hank Roberts, American cellist and vocalist.
  - Steve LaSpina, American bassist.
  - Vince Jones, Australian singer, songwriter, trumpeter, and flugelhornist.
- 27 – Paolo Vinaccia, Italian composer, drummer, and percussionist, living in Norway.
- 28 – Donald Brown, American pianist.

April

- 1 – Knut Værnes, Norwegian guitarist, composer and band leader.
- 3 – Chuck Deardorf, American bassist.
- 4 – Michel Camilo, Santo Domingan pianist and composer.
- 9 – Steve Holt, Canadian musician.
- 16 – Brian Rolland, American guitarist, composer, and songwriter (died 2018).
- 28 – Frank Jakobsen, Norwegian drummer, Bergen Big Band.

May

- 3 – Angela Bofill, American vocalist and songwriter.
- 9 – Barb Jungr, Englist singer and songwriter.
- 10 – Lorne Lofsky, Canadian guitarist, Oscar Peterson Quartet.
- 21 – Marc Ribot, American guitarist and composer.
- 24 – Catherine Whitney, American singer, composer, and lyricist.

June

- 4 – Scott Earl Holman, American pianist.
- 5 – Peter Erskine, American drummer and composer.
- 11 – John Bernard Riley, American drummer and educator.
- 12 – Jesper Lundgaard, Danish bassist, bandleader, and composer.
- 26 – Øystein Norvoll, Norwegian guitarist.
- 27 – Madeline Eastman, American singer.
- 30 – Eric Von Essen, American bassist, pianist, and composer (died 1997).

July

- 7 – Pam Bricker, American singer (died 2005).
- 10 – Stu Goldberg, American keyboarder.
- 13
  - Bruno Råberg, Swedish-born bassist and composer.
  - Ernst Ulrich Deuker, German bassist and bass clarinetist, Ideal.
- 19 – Ivar Thomassen, Norwegian folk singer, songwriter, and jazz pianist (died 2016).
- 22
  - Al Di Meola, American guitarist and composer.
  - Johannes Bauer, German trombonist (died 2016).
- 25 – Svein Olav Blindheim, Norwegian upright bassist.
- 28 – Nnenna Freelon, American singer.
- 29 – Michel Benita, Algerian-French upright bass player.

August

- 11 – Steve Nelson, American vibraphonist.
- 12 – Pat Metheny, American guitarist and composer, Pat Metheny Group.
- 15 – Dennis González, American trumpeter, poet, visual artist, and music educator.
- 19 – Tim Hagans, American trumpet player, arranger and composer.
- 21 – Bodil Niska, Norwegian saxophonist.
- 26 – Scott Henderson, American guitarist.
- 29
  - Enzo Nini, Italian saxophonist, flautist, composer, and arranger.
  - Stephanie Nakasian, American vocalist.
- 31 – Sergio Caputo, Italian singer, writer, composer, and guitarist.

September

- 2 – Steve Masakowski, American guitarist, educator, and inventor.
- 12 – Scott Hamilton, American tenor saxophonist.
- 18 – Jovino Santos-Neto, Brazilian-American pianist, flutist, composer, arranger, educator, and record producer.
- 20 – Peter White, American guitarist.
- 24 – Jay Hoggard, American vibraphonist.
- 26
  - Bill Milkowski, American jazz critic, journalist, and author.
  - Craig Chaquico, Portuguese-American guitarist, songwriter, composer, and record producer.
- 30
  - Basia, Polish singer-songwriter and record producer.
  - Patrice Rushen, American pianist vocalist and composer.

October

- 4 – Paleka, Portuguese percussionist.
- 9 – Eugenio Toussaint, Mexican composer, arranger and pianist (died 2011).
- 10 – Ondrej Havelka, Czech singer, actor and director.
- 10 – Ed Cherry, American guitarist.
- 16 – Tim Berne, American saxophone player.
- 18 – Rick Vandivier, American guitarist, composer and educator.
- 20 – Günter Müller, German drummer and sound artist.
- 24
  - Anthony Cox, American bassist and composer.
  - Cindy Breakspeare, Canadian-Jamaican musician.
- 27 – Wendell Brunious, American trumpeter and bandleader.
- 30 – Tom Browne, American trumpeter.
- 31 – Tim Sparks, American guitarist, singer, arranger, and composer.

November

- 1 – Carmen Lundy, American singer and composer.
- 8 – Kåre Garnes, Norwegian bassist.
- 23
  - Bruce Hornsby, American singer and keyboardist.
  - Pete Allen, English clarinettist, saxophonist, bandleader, and vocalist.
- 29 – Michael White, American clarinetist.

December

- 4 – Michael Moore, American saxophonist.
- 6
  - Steve Swell, American trombonist.
  - Wayne Peet, American pianist and organist.
- 9
  - Kip Hanrahan, American music impresario, record producer and percussionist.
  - Steve Rodby, American bassist, Pat Metheny Group.
- 10 – Edvard Askeland, Norwegian bassist.
- 12 – Jeff Johnson, American bass player.
- 16 – Joe Fonda, American bassist.
- 22 – Warren Benbow, American drummer.
- 26 – Noel Pointer, American violinist and record producer (died 1994).

Unknown date

- J.T. Lewis, American drummer.
- John Butcher, English tenor and soprano saxophonist.
- John Russell, English guitarist.
- Orhan Demir, Turkish-Canadian guitarist.
- Tchavolo Schmitt, French guitarist.
- Theresa Hightower, African-American singer (died 2018).
- Yuri Lemeshev, Russian-American accordionist.

== See also ==
- 1950s in jazz
- List of years in jazz
- 1954 in music

== Bibliography ==
- The New Real Book, Volume I. Sher Music. 1988. ISBN 0-9614701-4-3.
- The New Real Book, Volume II. Sher Music. 1991. ISBN 0-9614701-7-8.
- The New Real Book, Volume III. Sher Music. 1995. ISBN 1-883217-30-X.
- The Real Book, Volume I (6th ed.). Hal Leonard. 2004. ISBN 0-634-06038-4.
- The Real Book, Volume II (2nd ed.). Hal Leonard. 2007. ISBN 978-1-4234-2452-9.
- The Real Book, Volume III (2nd ed.). Hal Leonard. 2006. ISBN 0-634-06136-4.
- The Real Jazz Book. Warner Bros. ISBN 978-91-85041-36-7.
- The Real Vocal Book, Volume I. Hal Leonard. 2006. ISBN 0-634-06080-5.
