= Chris Connor discography =

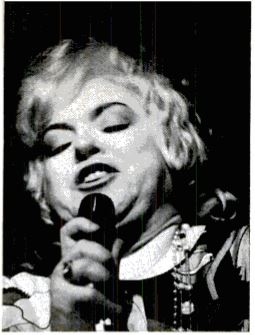
- Chris Connor in 1971.
- Studio albums: 34
- Live albums: 3
- Compilation albums: 13
- Singles: 23
- Promotional singles: 4
- Album appearances: 5

The discography of American singer, Chris Connor, contains 34 studio albums, 13 compilation albums, three live albums, 23 singles, four promotional singles and five album appearances. Connor's first recordings were released as singles in collaboration with Jerry Wald and Stan Kenton between 1952 and 1953. In 1954, the Bethlehem label issued her debut studio albums, Chris Connor Sings Lullabys of Birdland and Chris Connor Sings Lullabys for Lovers. Two more Bethlehem albums were released through 1956 and it was followed by her self-titled LP with Atlantic Records the same year. Atlantic released several singles by Connor, including two the made the US Hot 100: "Trust in Me" and "I Miss You So". The latter was her only single to make the top 40.

Seven studio LP's of Connor's material was released by Atlantic through 1959 including Chris Connor Sings The George Gershwin Almanac of Song (1957), A Jazz Date with Chris Connor (1958) and Chris Connor Sings Ballads of the Sad Cafe (1959). The label also issued her first live product in 1960 called Chris in Person. The same year, her vocals appeared on the Nina Simone collaborative compilation, Nina Simone and Her Friends. In 1961, she collaborated with Maynard Ferguson on two studio LP's: Double Exposure and Two's Company. Two albums were then recorded with the FM label, beginning with live product Chris Connor at the Village Gate: Early Show/Late Show (1963). Two more LP's were issued by ABC–Paramount including Chris Connor Now! (1966).

Connor recorded sporadically over the next ten years until the release of 1977's Chris Moves by CBS/Sony. The album (along with four others) were released exclusively by Japanese labels including Alone Together (1979) and Love Being Here with You (1983). Two albums with the US-based Contemporary Records were released, such as Classic (1987). Four studio albums were then issued by the Japanese Alfa Records in the 1990s decade like Angel Eyes (1991) and Blue Moon (1995). Connor's final studio recordings were issued by the HighNote label in the 2000s, concluding with Everything I Love in 2003. Compilations have since been issued including The Complete Atlantic and FM Albums in 2019. In 2014, "I Hear Music" made the French singles chart.

== Albums ==
=== Studio albums ===
List of studio albums, showing all relevant details
Title	Album details
Chris Connor Sings Lullabys of Birdland	Released: October 1954; Label: Bethlehem; Formats: 10-inch LP
Chris Connor Sings Lullabys for Lovers	Released: December 1954; Label: Bethlehem; Formats: 10-inch LP
This Is Chris	Released: August 1955; Label: Bethlehem; Formats: LP
Chris Connor	Released: April 1956; Label: Atlantic; Formats: LP
He Loves Me, He Loves Me Not	Released: November 1956; Label: Atlantic; Formats: LP
Chris Connor Sings The George Gershwin Almanac of Song	Released: 1957; Label: Atlantic; Formats: LP
I Miss You So	Released: 1957; Label: Atlantic; Formats: LP
A Jazz Date with Chris Connor	Released: 1958; Label: Atlantic; Formats: LP
Chris Craft	Released: 1958; Label: Atlantic; Formats: LP
Chris Connor Sings Ballads of the Sad Cafe	Released: 1959; Label: Atlantic; Formats: LP
Witchcraft	Released: 1959; Label: Atlantic; Formats: LP
A Portrait of Chris	Released: 1960; Label: Atlantic; Formats: LP
Double Exposure (with Maynard Ferguson)	Released: 1961; Label: Atlantic; Formats: LP
Two's Company (with Maynard Ferguson)	Released: 1961; Label: Roulette; Formats: LP
Free Spirits	Released: 1962; Label: Atlantic; Formats: LP
A Weekend in Paris	Released: 1964; Label: FM; Formats: LP
Chris Connor Sings the Gentle Bossa Nova	Released: 1965; Label: ABC–Paramount; Formats: LP
Chris Connor Now!	Released: 1966; Label: ABC–Paramount; Formats: LP
Softly and Swingin'	Released: 1969; Label: Victor World Group; Formats: LP
Sketches	Released: 1972; Label: Stanyan; Formats: LP
Chris Moves	Released: 1977; Label: CBS/Sony; Formats: LP
Sweet and Swinging	Released: 1978; Label: Progressive; Formats: LP
Alone Together	Released: 1979; Label: Lob; Formats: LP
Love Being Here with You	Released: 1983; Label: Stash; Formats: LP
Three Pearls (with Ernestine Anderson and Carol Sloane)	Released: 1984; Label: Eastworld; Formats: LP, CD
Classic	Released: 1987; Label: Contemporary; Formats: LP, CD
New Again	Released: 1988; Label: Contemporary; Formats: LP, CD, cassette
As Time Goes By	Released: 1991; Label: Alfa; Formats: CD
Angel Eyes	Released: 1991; Label: Alfa; Formats: CD
My Funny Valentine	Released: 1993; Label: Alfa; Formats: CD
Blue Moon	Released: 1995; Label: Alfa; Formats: CD
Haunted Heart	Released: 2001; Label: HighNote; Formats: CD
I Walk with Music	Released: 2002; Label: HighNote; Formats: CD
Everything I Love	Released: 2003; Label: HighNote; Formats: CD

=== Compilation albums ===
List of compilation albums, showing all relevant details
Title	Album details
Chris	Released: 1956; Label: Bethlehem; Formats: LP
Bethlehem's Girl Friends (with Julie London and Carmen McRae)	Released: 1956; Label: Bethlehem; Formats: LP
Nina Simone and Her Friends (Nina Simone with Carmen McRae and Chris Connor)	Released: 1960; Label: Bethlehem; Formats: LP
Many Sides of Chris Connor	Released: 1961; Label: Atlantic; Formats: LP
The Best of Chris Conner	Released: 1966; Label: Stateside; Formats: LP
Kenton's Girl Friends (Stan Kenton with various artists)	Released: 1973; Label: Capitol; Formats: LP
Carmen McRae vs. Chris Connor (with Carmen McRae)	Released: 1974; Label: Polydor; Formats: LP
The Finest of Chris Connor	Released: 1975; Label: Bethlehem; Formats: LP
Singin' in N.Y.	Released: 1978; Label: Roulette; Formats: LP
The Best of Chris Connor	Released: 1991; Label: Atlantic; Formats: CD
Introducing Chris Connor	Released: February 18, 2008; Label: Rhino/Warner Jazz; Formats: CD
Jazz	Released: December 5, 2016; Label: Warner; Formats: Digital
The Complete Atlantic and FM Albums	Released: July 12, 2019; Label: Warner; Formats: Digital

=== Live albums ===
List of live albums, showing all relevant details
Title	Album details
Chris in Person	Released: 1960; Label: Atlantic; Formats: LP
Chris Connor at the Village Gate: Early Show/Late Show	Released: 1963; Label: FM; Formats: LP
Chris Connor Live	Released: 1983; Label: Applause; Formats: LP

== Singles ==
List of singles, with selected chart positions, showing other relevant details
Title	Year	Peak chart positions		Album
Title	Year	US	FRA	Album
"You're the Cream in My Coffee" (Jerry Wald and His Orchestra with Chris Connor)	1952	—	—	—N/a
"Pennies from Heaven" (Jerry Wald and His Orchestra with Chris Connor)	1952	—	—	—N/a
"Terremoto" (Jerry Wald and His Orchestra with Chris Connor)	1952	—	—	—N/a
"And the Bull Walked Around, Olay!" (Stan Kenton and His Orchestra with Chris Connor)	1953	—	—	—N/a
"All About Ronnie" (Stan Kenton and His Orchestra with Chris Connor)	1953	—	—	—N/a
"Gimme, Gimme, Gimme, Gimme, Gimme (The Miser's Serenade)"	1954	—	—	—N/a
"Ask Me"	1954	—	—	—N/a
"Lullaby of Birdland"	1954	—	—	Chris Connor Sings Lullabys of Birdland
"Go Way from My Window"	1956	—	—	I Miss You So
"I Miss You So"	1956	34	—	I Miss You So
"Time Out for Tears"	1956	—	—	I Miss You So
"Trust in Me"	1957	95	—	I Miss You So
"Under Paris Skies"	1958	—	—	—N/a
"Hallelujah I Love Him So"	1958	—	—	—N/a
"Flying Home"	1959	—	—	—N/a
"Señor Blues"	1959	—	—	Chris in Person
"That's My Desire"	1960	—	—	—N/a
"Invitation"	1960	—	—	—N/a
"Summertime" (with Maynard Ferguson)	1961	—	—	Double Exposure
"Opportunity"	1962	—	—	Free Spirits
"A Lot of Livin' to Do"	1963	—	—	Chris Connor at the Village Gate
"Never on Sunday"	1966	—	—	Now!
"I Hear Music"	2014	—	103	Bethlehem Blends: Day & Night
"—" denotes a recording that did not chart or was not released in that territory.

=== Promotional singles ===
List of promotional singles, showing title, year released and album name
Title	Year	Album	Ref.
"Try a Little Tenderness"	1958	Chris Connor Sings Lullabys of Birdland	
"Come Back to Sorrento"	1958	Chris	
"I Get a Kick Out of You (Performed Live On The Ed Sullivan Show 4/10/60)"	2010	—N/a	
"Come Rain or Come Shine (Performed Live On The Ed Sullivan Show 7/17/60)"	2010	—N/a	

== Other album appearances ==
List of non-single guest appearances, with other performing artists, showing year released and album name
Title	Year	Other artist(s)	Album	Ref.
"Chris Connor Program No. 321" (Note: The program disc did not officially label the song titles. However, in the recording, Connor performs three tracks: "I Hear Music", "Just in Time" and "Witchcraft".)	1960	—N/a	Manhattan Melodies Program No. 321	
"The Sweetest Sounds"	1962	—N/a	No Strings: An After-Theater Version	
"Look No Further"	1962	—N/a	No Strings: An After-Theater Version	
"Nobody Told Me"	1962	—N/a	No Strings: An After-Theater Version	
"No Strings"	1962	—N/a	No Strings: An After-Theater Version	
