= 1955 in jazz =

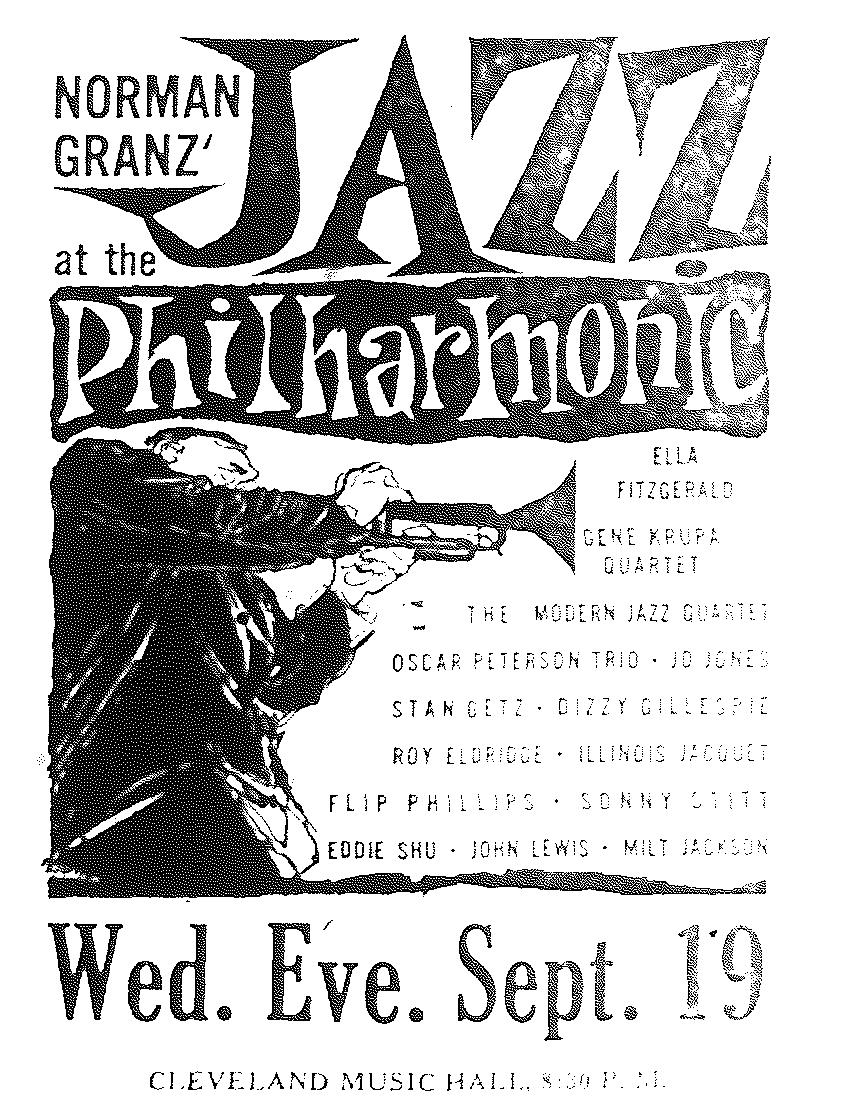
- Cleveland Call and Post, September 8, 1955
- Decade: 1950s in jazz
- Music: 1955 in music
- Standards: List of post-1950 jazz standards
- See also: 1954 in jazz – 1956 in jazz

This is a timeline documenting events of Jazz in the year 1955.

== Events ==
=== July ===
- 15 – The 2nd Newport Jazz Festival started in Newport, Rhode Island (July 15 – 17).
- 17
  - Miles Davis historic performance at the Newport Jazz Festival resulted in George Avakian signing him to Columbia Records. This led to the formation of his so-called “first great quintet,” featuring John Coltrane, Red Garland, Paul Chambers, and Philly Joe Jones (the "’Round About Midnight" sessions).

== Album releases ==
- Chris Connor: This Is Chris
- Harry Edison
  - Buddy and Sweets (With Buddy Rich)
  - Pres and Sweets (With Lester Young)
- Erroll Garner: Concert by the Sea
- Ahmad Jamal: Chamber Music of the New Jazz
- Stan Kenton
  - Contemporary Concepts
  - Duet (With June Christy)
- Thelonious Monk: Thelonious Monk Plays Duke Ellington
- Frank Morgan: Frank Morgan
- Herbie Nichols: The Prophetic Herbie Nichols, Vol. 1 & 2
- Oscar Peterson
  - At Zardi's
  - In a Romantic Mood
- George Shearing: The Shearing Spell
- Horace Silver: Horace Silver and the Jazz Messengers (recorded; released 1956)
- Frank Sinatra: In the Wee Small Hours
- Lennie Tristano: Lennie Tristano (released 1956)

== Deaths ==
March

- 12 – Charlie "Bird" Parker, American saxophonist and composer (born 1920).

April

- 23 – Henry Busse, German-born trumpeter (born 1894).
- 30 – Dave Peyton, American songwriter, pianist, and arranger (born 1889).

May

- 17 – Ernst van 't Hoff, Dutch pianist and bandleader (born 1908).
- 25 – Wardell Gray, American tenor saxophonists (born 1921).

June

- 28 – John Spikes, American jazz musician and entrepreneur (born 1881).

August

- 28 – Bob Gordon, American baritone saxophonist (born 1928).

October

- 21 – Dick Twardzik, American pianist (born 1931).

September

- Reuben Reeves, American jazz trumpeter and bandleader (born 1905).
- 25 – Shotaro Moriyasu, Japanese pianist (born 1924).

November

- 10 – Junior Raglin, American upright bassist (born 1917).
- 12 – Bessie Brown, American classic female blues, jazz, and cabaret singer (born 1890).
- 17 – James P. Johnson, American pianist and composer (born 1894).

December

- 3 – Cow Cow Davenport, American pianist, organist, and singer.

Unknown date

- Eddie Pollack, American saxophonist (born 1899).
- Porter Grainger, American pianist (born 1891)

== Births ==
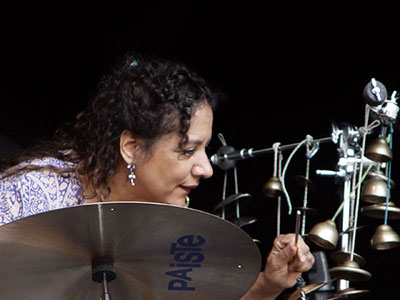
Marilyn Mazur in 2014.

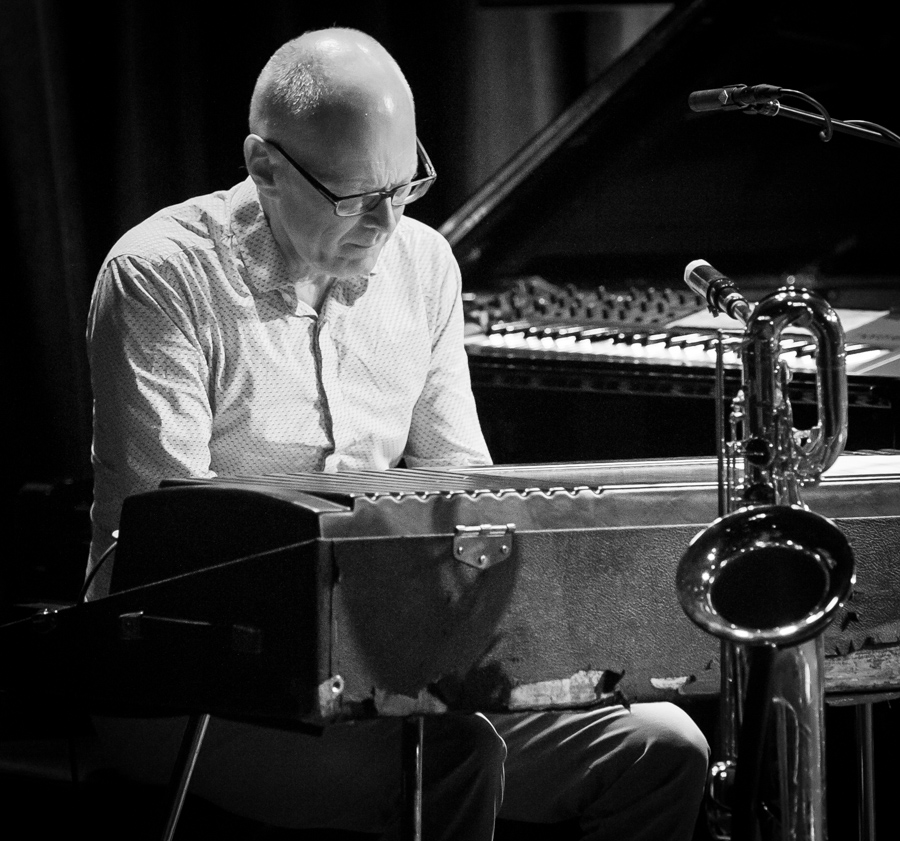
Rune Klakegg at Victoria during the 2016 Oslo Jazzfestival.

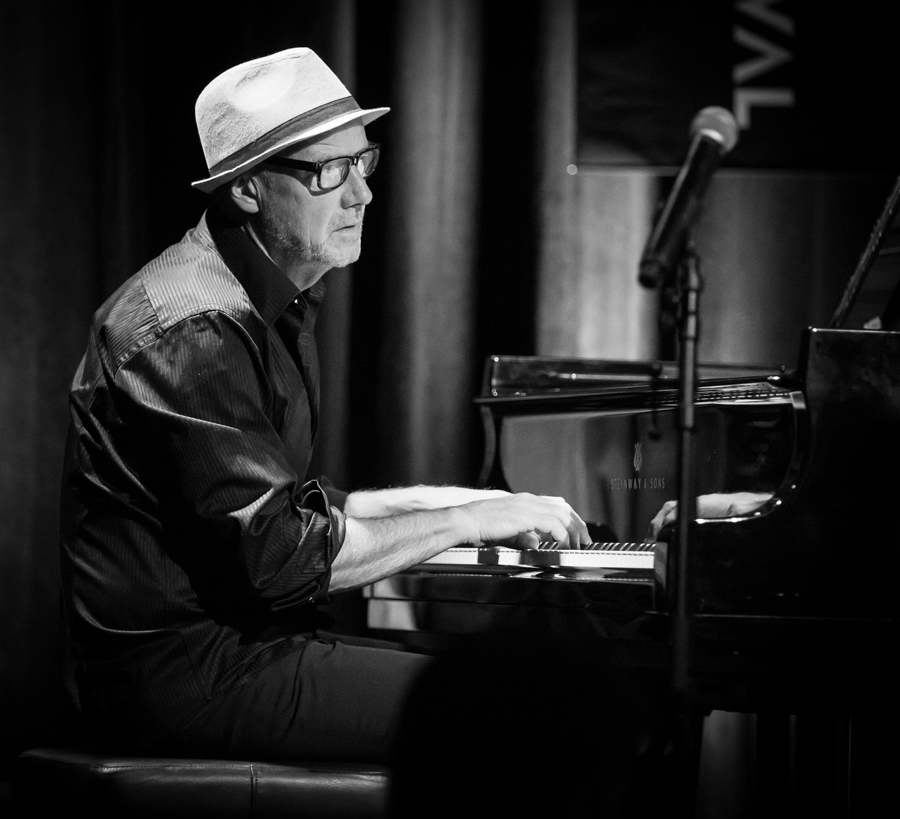
Jon Balke at Victoria during the 2016 Oslo Jazzfestival.

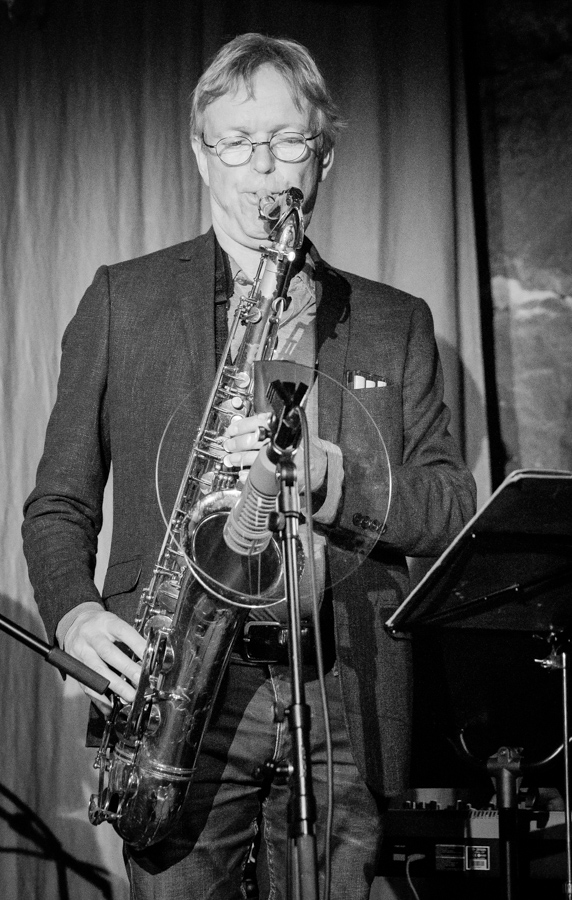
Jan Kåre Hystad at the 2017 Vargtime Jazz, Jølst.

January

- 10 – Ole Henrik Giørtz, Norwegian pianist.
- 11 – Ed Schuller, American bassist and composer.
- 12 – Jane Ira Bloom, American soprano saxophonist and composer.
- 17 – Vladislav Sendecki, Polish pianist.
- 18 – Marilyn Mazur, Danish percussionist, drummer, composer, vocalist, pianist, dancer, and bandleader.
- 22 – Phillip Johnston, American composer and saxophonist.
- 26 – Gary Crosby, British upright bassist, music arranger, and educator.
- 27 – Pheeroan akLaff, American drummer.

February

- 12 – Bill Laswell, American bassist and producer.
- 13 – Akiko Yano, Japanese singer and composer.
- 19 – David Murray, American tenor saxophonist and bass clarinetist.
- 27 – Glenn Horiuchi, American pianist, composer, and shamisen player (died 2000).

March

- 1 – Enzo Avitabile, Italian saxophonist and singer-songwriter.
- 3 – Bheki Mseleku, South-African pianist, saxophonist, guitarist, and composer (died 2008).
- 4 – Boon Gould or Rowland Charles Gould, British guitarist, bassist, and saxophonist, Level 42.
- 23 – Gerry Hemingway, American composer and percussionist.
- 24 – Mark Hewins, British guitarist.
- 29 – Marina Sirtis, British actor and voice actor.

April

- 10 – Lesley Garrett, British singer, musician, presenter and singer-songwriter.
- 13
  - Preston Reed, American guitarist.
  - Simon Spang-Hanssen, Danish saxophonist.
- 14 – Laurent Cugny, French pianist, bandleader, composer, jazz critic, and musicologist.
- 15 – Jeff Golub, American guitarist (died 2015).
- 19 – Rune Klakegg, Norwegian pianist.

May

- 5
  - Alain Caron, French-Canadian bassist.
  - Brian Hughes, Canadian guitarist.
- 10 – Chris Tyle, American cornetist, trumpeter, and drummer.
- 19 – Geoff Stradling, American pianist, keyboardist, composer, and arranger.
- 22 – Chalmers Alford, American guitarist (died 2008).
- 23 – Dean Friedman, American singer-songwriter, keyboardist, and guitarist.
- 27 – Ben Clatworthy, English saxophonist, clarinetist and flautist.
- 28 – Janet Seidel, Australian singer and pianist (died 2017).
- 29
  - Mars Williams, American saxophonist.
  - Mike Porcaro, American bassist, Toto (died 2015).
- 30 – Topper Headon, English drummer, The Clash.
- 31
  - Marty Ehrlich, American saxophonist, clarinetist, and flautist.
  - Tommy Emmanuel, Australian guitarist, songwriter, and singer.

June

- 4 – Johnny Alegre, Filipino guitarist and composer, Johnny Alegre Affinity.
- 5
  - Erica Lindsay, American saxophonist and composer.
  - Hugh Marsh, Canadian violinist.
- 7 – Jon Balke, Norwegian pianist and composer, Magnetic North Orchestra.
- 12 – Enver Izmaylov, Ukrainian-Tatar guitarist.
- 26
  - Joey Baron, American drummer.
  - Mick Jones, British guitarist and a vocalist, The Clash.
- 27 – Santi Debriano, Panamanian upright bassist.
- 29 – Jean Derome, French-Canadian saxophonist, flautist, and composer.

July

- 5 – Eric Watson, American pianist and composer.
- 6 – Rick Braun, American trumpet player and multi-instrumentalist.
- 7 – John Campbell, American pianist.
- 9 – Jan Kåre Hystad, Norwegian saxophonist, Bergen Big Band.
- 10 – Mihály Dresch, Hungarian saxophonist.
- 15 – Pål Thowsen, Norwegian drummer.
- 16
  - Annie Whitehead, English trombonist.
  - Wolfgang Reisinger, Austrian percussionist.
- 17 – Mark Feldman, American violinist.
- 21 – Jukka Linkola, Finnish pianist and composer.
- 22 – Joshua Breakstone, American guitarist.
- 28 – Gerald Veasley, American bass guitarist.
- 31 – Paul Sullivan, American pianist and composer.

August

- 3 – Hamid Drake, American drummer and percussionist.
- 7 – Jerry Tachoir, American vibraphone and marimba performer.
- 10 – Peter Sprague, American guitarist, record producer, and audio engineer.
- 13 – Mulgrew Miller, American pianist, composer, and educator (died 2013).
- 17 – Grażyna Auguścik, Polish singer, composer, and arranger.
- 18 – Shelly Berg, American pianist.
- 19 – Dean Brown, American guitarist.
- 22 – Jeff Hirshfield, American drummer.
- 23 – Avery Sharpe, American upright bassist.
- 27 – Laura Fygi, Dutch singer.
- 30 – Helge Schneider, German pianist and multi-instrumentalist.

September

- 1
  - Andrzej Łukasik, Polish upright bassist.
  - Wayne Horvitz, American composer, keyboardist and record producer.
- 9 – Ivan Smirnov, Russian guitarist (died 2018).
- 11
  - Hiram Bullock, American guitarist (died 2008).
  - Jaribu Shahid, American bassist.
- 12 – Adam Rudolph, American composer and percussionist.
- 13 – Joe Morris, American guitarist, bassist, and composer.
- 14 – Oliver Weindling, British jazz promoter and founder of the Babel Label.
- 25 – Steve Byrd, English guitarist, Gillan and Kim Wilde (heart attack) (died 2016).
- 28 – Kenny Kirkland, American pianist/keyboardist (died 1998).
- 29 – Enzo Pietropaoli, Italian bassist.
- 30 – Scott Fields, American guitarist, composer, and band leader.

October

- 1
  - Curtis Lundy, American upright bassist.
  - Morten Gunnar Larsen, Norwegian pianist.
- 12 – Jane Siberry, Canadian singer-songwriter.
- 18 – Vitold Rek, Polish upright bassist, composer and educator.
- 21 – Fred Hersch, American pianist.
- 24 – Jay Anderson, American upright bassist
- 25 – Robin Eubanks, American trombonist.

November

- 7 – Kitty Margolis, American singer.
- 8 – Patricia Barber, American singer, pianist, songwriter and bandleader.
- 15 – Georgina Born, British cellist, academic, and anthropologist, Henry Cow.
- 19 – Chris Cain, American guitarist.
- 29 – Adam Nussbaum, American drummer.

December

- 4 – Cassandra Wilson, American vocalist and songwriter.
- 7 – Chuck Loeb, American guitarist, Steps Ahead and Fourplay (died 2017).
- 8 – Nathan East, American bassist and vocalist.
- 10 – Billie Davies, American drummer and composer.
- 14 – Dan Barrett, American arranger, cornetist and trombonist.
- 23 – Grace Knight, English-Australian vocalist, saxophonist, and songwriter.

Unknown date

- Annemarie Roelofs, Dutch trombone player and violinist, Henry Cow.
- Eduardo Niebla, Spanish guitarist.
- Kenny Klein, American fiddler and author.
- Kyle Jones, American bass guitarist, archivist, and politician.
- Nat Reeves, American bassist.

== See also ==
- 1950s in jazz
- List of years in jazz
- 1955 in music
