= Spring Is Here =

1938 popular song by Rodgers and Hart

Song
- Published: 1938
- Genre: Popular
- Composer: Richard Rodgers
- Lyricist: Lorenz Hart

"Spring Is Here" is a 1938 popular song composed by Richard Rodgers with lyrics by Lorenz Hart for the musical I Married an Angel (1938), where it was introduced by Dennis King and Vivienne Segal.

Rodgers and Hart had previously written a song entitled "Spring Is Here in Person", which served as the title song for a 1929 Broadway production (cinematized in 1930; see Spring Is Here).

Typical of Hart at his most moody but perceptive is "Spring Is Here", a love song about love's absence. Hart specialized in regret. His words assume a musing mood that questions the promised springtime romance of banal ballads, Hart's glum verse contradicting Rodgers' lush melody:
Spring is here! Why doesn't my heart go dancing? / Spring is here! Why isn't the waltz entrancing? / Spring is here! Why doesn't the breeze delight me? / Stars appear! Why doesn't the night invite me?
His last plaintive line: Spring is here, I hear is one of the most perfect couplets in all of song, summing up an attitude in a fragile, forlorn pun. This is Larry Hart at his best setting love on its ear in a deft delicate, bemused, achingly honest & Hart-felt touch.

—Gerald Nachman on "Spring Is Here"

Theatrical producer Josh Logan, a longtime associate of Rodgers & Hart, would opine that "the most touching [of Hart's lyrics] are those about unrequited love [with the 1938 song] 'Spring is Here' [being] one of the greatest examples". Hart had had a romantic interest in I Married an Angel leading lady Vivienne Segal who turned down more than one marriage proposal from him. Logan believed that Hart's lyrics for "Spring Is Here" evoked the composer's disappointment over Segal's failure to reciprocate his interest.

== Notable recordings ==
- Chet Baker, Deep in a Dream (2002, posthumous, previously unreleased)
- Shirley Bassey, Let's Face the Music (1962) – with Nelson Riddle and his Orchestra
- Tony Bennett, The Rodgers and Hart Songbook (1973)
- Nick Brignola, L.A. Bound (1979)
- June Christy, The Intimate Miss Christy (1963)
- Rosemary Clooney, Rosemary Clooney Sings Ballads (1985)
- John Coltrane, Standard Coltrane (1958)
- Chris Connor, Chris Connor Sings Lullabys of Birdland (1957)
- Larry Coryell, Private Concert (1999)
- Vic Damone, That Towering Feeling! (1956)
- Miles Davis, Miles Davis at Carnegie Hall (1961)
- Bill Evans, Portrait in Jazz (1959)
- Ella Fitzgerald; Ella Fitzgerald Sings the Rodgers & Hart Song Book (1956), 30 by Ella (1968)
- The Four Freshmen, Love Lost (1959)
- Erroll Garner; Piano Moods (1950), Long Ago and Far Away (1951), Concert by the Sea (1955; 2015 bonus track)
- Charlie Haden and Kenny Barron, Night and the City (1998)
- Ahmad Jamal, Ahmad Jamal Plays (1955)
- Felix Knight, original 78 rpm: Victor 25842 – Spring Is Here (Rodgers–Hart) by Leo Reisman & His Orchestra (1938)
- Julie London, Julie Is Her Name, Volume II (1958)
- Susannah McCorkle, I'll Take Romance (1992)
- Jessye Norman, The J. Norman Collection (1984)
- Anita O'Day, Anita O'Day and Billy May Swing Rodgers and Hart (1960)
- Carly Simon, Torch (1981)
- Nina Simone, Nina Simone with Strings (1966)
- Frank Sinatra; Columbia single (1947), Frank Sinatra Sings for Only the Lonely (1958)
- Jo Stafford, As You Desire Me (1952)
- Maxine Sullivan with Claude Thornhill & His Orchestra (1938)
- The Supremes, The Supremes Sing Rodgers & Hart (1967)
- Cal Tjader, Soul Sauce (1964)
- Danny Zeitlin, Mosaic Select (1967)
