= Kyle Jones (politician) =

American politician

Kyle W. Jones (born 1955) is a professional musician, archivist and is a former Maine state politician, from Bar Harbor, Maine. He is notable for his influence on the state's energy industry.

== Background and musical career ==
Born in Bar Harbor to a pianist mother and a drummer father, Jones grew up surrounded by music. He sang in the local church choir through high school and began playing bass guitar at age 12. He has performed widely, including before the United Nations, alongside such jazz notables as J. Eric Johnson, Steve Hunt, Premik Russell Tubbs and Hal Russell. In 1995, Jones released a recording of his composition Meltdown, on the CD of that name, in honor of his happenstance visit to Three Mile Island, on the night of March 28, 1979. He earned Summa Cum Laude degrees in mathematics, American studies and a Doctorate in Law from the University of Maine System. As noted by Chancellor J. Michael Orenduff in his 1995 State of Education address to the Maine House and Senate, Jones is the only student in the history of the University of Maine System to complete an entire mathematics degree in just two semesters.

== Political career ==
First elected to the Maine House of Representatives in 1994, Jones became Chair of the Joint Select Committee on Utilities and Energy in 1996. In this position, he drafted and sponsored Maine's Electric Deregulation Act, chairing all hearings and workshops. The act passed unanimously, and the resulting influx of cheap electricity and loss of monopoly status led to the closure of Maine Yankee Nuclear Plant in 1997. The act also mandates a 30% renewable resource portfolio for all companies selling electricity in Maine. He was named the 1997 Public Official of the Year in Maine. After serving for four years in the Maine House of Representatives, Jones chose not to run for office a third time.

Jones currently works as the senior archivist for composer Carman Moore.
