= Theresa Hightower =

African American Jazz singer

- Born: c. 1954; Atlanta, Georgia, U.S.
- Died: October 10, 2018 (aged 64)
- Occupation: Singer

Theresa Hightower (c. 1954 – October 10, 2018) was an American jazz singer. Born in Atlanta Georgia, she began her singing career at 19. Hightower played concert halls in the United States, Europe and the Middle East. She also played musical theatre and cabaret, and she appeared in movies. She died of colon cancer.
