= Jerry Tachoir =

American jazz musician (born 1955)

Jerry Tachoir (born August 7, 1955) is a jazz vibraphone and marimba performer, originally from McKeesport, Pennsylvania. Tachoir has performed at jazz festivals and concert halls and, as an artist and clinician for the Tama/Bergerault company, presented jazz improvisation clinics and mallet master classes at colleges and universities in North America and Europe.

A grammy nominated artist, Tachoir has numerous recordings released with his band, the Group Tachoir, and is the author of A Contemporary Mallet Method: An Approach to the Vibraphone and Marimba, published through Riohcat Music.
