= Chris Connor Sings Lullabys for Lovers =

Studio album by Chris Connor
- Released: December 1954
- Recorded: August 1954
- Genre: Jazz
- Label: Bethlehem

Chris Connor chronology
Chris Connor Sings Lullabys of Birdland (1954)	Chris Connor Sings Lullabys for Lovers (1954)	This Is Chris (1955)

Chris Connor Sings Lullabys for Lovers is a studio album by American singer, Chris Connor. It was released in December 1954 by Bethlehem Records was the second album of her career. The product contained eight songs which were jazz standards such as "Lush Life". It received positive critical response from critics and writers alike following its release.

== Background, recording and content ==
Chris Connor begun her career as a big band singer but soon became a solo artist known for her work in the cool jazz sub-genre of the jazz field. In the early 1950s, she signed a contract with Bethlehem Records and she found success with the release of debut album, Chris Connor Sings Lullabys of Birdland. Now in demand, Connor was brought back into the studio to record her next album in August 1954 called Chris Connor Sings Lullabys for Lovers. Unlike her previous release, Lullabys for Lovers featured a different backing ensemble, consisting of five session players. The album consisted of eight tracks that were all considered "standards" in the jazz genre like "Lush Life", "Out of This World" and "Stella by Starlight".

== Release and critical reception ==
Chris Connor Sings Lullabys for Lovers was released in December 1954 by Bethlehem Records and was distributed as a 10-inch vinyl LP, with four songs on each side of the disc. The product was met with critical acclaim following its release. Cash Box found it to have "a number of great standards in her unique and moving fashion" and praised Connor's performance, "One of the top voices in the jazz field is Chris Connor’s. The experience she’s acquired from singing with top bands for many years, is something few of today’s popular artists have." Richard Mortifoglio of AllMusic gave the album four out of five stars and found that Connor was "in excellent voice at the start of her solo career". Biographer Will Friedwald called her Bethlehem work (including the album) "superb", finding she was "best at barking bright bouncers".

== Track listing ==
Side one
No.	Title	Writer(s)	Length
1.	"Lush Life"	Billy Strayhorn	2:54
2.	"Out of This World"	Johnny Mercer	2:54
3.	"A Cottage for Sale"	Willard Robison; Larry Conley	2:35
4.	"How Long Has This Been Going On?"	George Gershwin; Ira Gershwin	2:33

Side two
No.	Title	Writer(s)	Length
1.	"Goodbye"	Gordon Jenkins	2:34
2.	"Stella by Starlight"	Ned Washington; Victor Young	2:27
3.	"Gone with the Wind"	Allie Wrubel; Herb Magidson	2:22
4.	"He's Coming Home"	Charles DeForest	2:44

== Personnel ==
All credits are adapted from the liner notes of Chris Connor Sings Lullabys for Lovers.

- Don Burns – Accordion
- Joe Cinderella – Guitar
- Chris Connor – Vocals
- Burt Goldblatt – Photographer, cover
- Art Mardigan – Drums
- Ronny Odrich – Clarinet, flute
- Robert Sylvester – Liner notes

== Release history ==
Release history and formats for Chris Connor Sings Lullabys for Lovers
Region	Date	Format	Label	Ref.
Various	December 1954	10-inch vinyl LP	Bethlehem Records	
Various	1956	10-inch vinyl LP	London American Recordings	
Various	2000–2013	Compact disc (CD)	Bethlehem Records; Verse Music Group	
Various	2023	Supper Club	Vinyl LP	
