= Eddie Pollack =

American jazz musician

Eddie Pollack (or Pollock) was an American jazz saxophonist.

Pollack learned saxophone under Erskine Tate, and first played professionally around 1925. Pollack was a fixture in many Chicago bands in the 1920s and early 1930s, playing with Detroit Shannon, Jimmie Noone, and Carl White. He also performed with Ma Rainey and Al Jolson. Many of the bands he played in never recorded. He led various house bands in the Chicago area into the 1940s.
