= He Loves Me, He Loves Me Not (album) =

Studio album by Chris Connor
- Released: November 1956
- Genre: Jazz; cool jazz
- Label: Atlantic

Chris Connor chronology
Chris Connor (1956)	He Loves Me, He Loves Me Not (1956)	I Miss You So (1957)

He Loves Me, He Loves Me Not is a studio album by American singer, Chris Connor. It was released in November 1956 by Atlantic Records and was her fifth studio album. The jazz LP contained 12 tracks of ballads, including covers of "High on a Windy Hill" and "Suddenly, It's Spring". It also featured an orchestra conducted by Ralph Burns. The album received positive critical reviews from Billboard, Cash Box and DownBeat.

== Background, recording and content ==
After several albums of jazz recordings for the Bethlehem label, Chris Connor moved to Atlantic in 1956. Her first-label LP was a 1956 eponymous album, and she would record 11 more albums with Atlantic. The projects were either consist of a quartet, a nonet (nine session players) or a string orchestra. He Loves Me, He Loves Me Not immediately followed her eponymous release and was backed by a string orchestra conducted by Ralph Burns. The project consisted of 12 tracks in total that were all covers performed in a ballad style. Among them were "High on a Windy Hill", "Suddenly It's Spring" and "Round About".

== Release and critical reception ==
He Loves Me, He Loves Me Not was released by Atlantic Records in November 1956 and originally distributed as a vinyl LP with six tracks on each side of the disc. According to Billboard, the LP placed in the top ten of the "Best-Selling Jazz" albums on December 29, 1956. It received a positive critical response as well. Billboard described the LP as "vocal mood music" and found there was "plenty of meat here for both pop and jazz jocks." Cash Box believed the product would produce sales in the pop field and concluded by writing, "A Chris Connor treat. Superb follow-up to her debut LP on Atlantic—a recent chart album." Robert Clay of DownBeat described it as an album with a "romantic mood" with a "superb" track listing and believed it was Connor's "best LP" to date. AllMusic rated it three out of five stars.

== Track listing ==
Side one
No.	Title	Writer(s)	Length
1.	"High on a Windy Hill"	Alex Kramer; Joan Whitney	3:44
2.	"Round About"	Vernon Duke; Ogden Nash	3:56
3.	"Angel Eyes"	Matt Dennis; Earl Brent	3:41
4.	"You Stepped Out of a Dream"	Gus Kahn; Nacio Herb Brown	3:48
5.	"Why Can't I"	Rodgers and Hart	3:41
6.	"Suddenly, It's Spring"	Johnny Burke; Jimmy Van Heusen	3:09

Side two
No.	Title	Writer(s)	Length
1.	"About the Blues"	Arthur Hamilton	3:41
2.	"Oh! You Crazy Moon"	Burke; Van Heusen	3:40
3.	"But Not for Me"	George and Ira Gershwin	3:47
4.	"I Guess I'll Hang My Tears Out to Dry"	Jule Styne; Sammy Cahn	3:27
5.	"I Wonder What Became of Me"	Johnny Mercer; Harold Arlen	4:11
6.	"Thursday's Child"	Elisse Boyd; Murray Grand	3:54

== Personnel ==
All credits are adapted from the liner notes of He Loves Me, He Loves Me Not.

- Earl Brown – Recording engineer
- Ralph Burns – Conductor (orchestra), arrangements
- Chris Connor – Vocals
- Nesuhi Ertegun – Supervision
- John Cue – Recording engineer
- Tom Dowd – Recording engineer
- Marvin Israel – Cover design
- Jay Maisel – Cover photo
- John S. Wilson – Liner notes

== Release history ==
Release history and formats for He Loves Me, He Loves Me Not
Region	Date	Format	Label	Ref
Various	November 1956	LP mono	Atlantic Records; London Records	
Japan	1991–2013	Compact disc (CD)	Atlantic Records	
Various	Circa 2020	Music download; streaming	Atlantic Records; Warner Strategic	
