= Rick Vandivier =

American jazz guitarist

Background information
- Born: October 18, 1954; Lima, Ohio, U.S.
- Genres: Jazz, jazz fusion, blues
- Occupation: Musician
- Instrument: Guitar
- Years active: 1972–present
- Labels: Avatar
- Member of: Primary Colors; Vandivier
- Website: www.rickvandivier.com

Rick Vandivier (born October 18, 1954) is an American jazz guitarist. He is the leader of the group Vandivier and the co-founder and lead guitarist of Primary Colors, a group that includes vocalist Nate Pruitt.

== Music career ==
Vandivier is a graduate of Berklee College of Music in Boston. and San Jose State University where he teaches guitar. In his formative years, in addition to private studies with Pat Metheny and Mick Goodrick, Vandivier took master classes with Christopher Parkening, Rey De La Torre, Michael Lorimer, Michael Hedges, Tuck Andress, and Manuel Barrueco.

His performing career has been highlighted by performances at Carnegie Hall, the Great American Music Hall, and the Berlin Jazz Festival in addition to the North Sea Jazz Festival in The Hague, Abidjan (Ivory Coast, Africa) the Lyric Opera of Chicago, the Wilshire Theater in Los Angeles, the Berklee Performance Center in Boston, and the American Conservatory Theater in San Francisco, the Seattle Opera House, and the Metropolitan Museum of Art. Artists he has performed with include Smith Dobson, Albert "Tootie" Heath, Bruce Forman, John Handy, Mose Allison, David Grisman, Richie Cole, and Dr. Lonnie Smith. He has also performed with the orchestras of the American Musical Theater of San Jose, Opera San Jose, and TheatreWorks.

Vandivier and Nate Pruitt achieved growing recognition in the 1980s in A Little Night Music, a South Bay sextet led by keyboardist Ed Manning. That group appeared at a number of international jazz festivals and recorded two albums - Late One Night (1983) (includes Matt Finders and Tuck and Patti) and Sitting Ducks (1985).

Another musical pairing solidified into a group called Threesome with bassist Benny Rietveld, best known for his work with Santana and Miles Davis. In 1994 they took the name Primary Colors and recorded the band's 1999 debut album We Know How It Feels (Avatar Productions).

== Discography ==
- Spirit of the Room (2004)
- Straight Ahead (2006)
- Vandivier (CD Baby, 2008)
- Under One Roof (Avatar Productions, 2016)
