= Catherine Whitney =

American singer

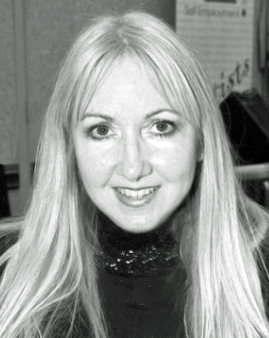
- circa 2006

Background information
- Born: Chicago, Illinois, U.S.
- Genres: Jazz
- Occupations: Singer, lyricist
- Instrument: Vocals
- Years active: 1990s–present
- Website: catherinewhitney.com (archived)

Catherine Jane Whitney (born in Chicago, Illinois) is an American jazz singer, composer, and lyricist. She was a lyricist for trumpeter Freddie Hubbard.

Whitney learned about music as a child, since her mother, Dorothy Brady, made a living as a vocalist and bandleader in Chicago in the 1950s and '60s. Her stepfather was George E. Lescher, a pianist who played with the Spike Jones Band during World War II and was a longtime Chicago resident. In later years, he led the George Lescher Ballroom Orchestra.

Whitney began her professional jazz singing career in the early 1990s under the mentoring of Von Freeman, a tenor saxophonist in Chicago. Jerry Brown and Gloria Cooper have recorded her work and three songs (in collaboration with Curtis Fuller, Rodgers Grant, and Milton Sealey). In October 2010, New York jazz vocalist Suzanne Pittson recorded a rendition of Freddie Hubbard's song "Our Own" (based on "Gibraltar"), which contained lyrics by Whitney. She has collaborated with Johnny Griffin, Houston Person, Clifford Jordan, Stanley Turrentine, Ray Brown, and Pete Cosey. She is also a Broadcast Music Incorporated (BMI) affiliated writer.

She has worked with many Chicago musicians, including Von Freeman, John Young, Jodie Christian, John Bany, Richie Cole, Robert Shy, Tommy Muellner, Rusty Jones, Jose Valdes, Arnold Gitard, and Johnie Faren.
