= Chris Connor (album) =

- Cover of 2005 Warner Jazz (UK) reissue

Studio album by Chris Connor
- Released: April 1956
- Recorded: January 19, 23, and February 8, 1956
- Genre: Jazz
- Label: Atlantic
- Producer: Nesuhi Ertegun, Ahmet Ertegun, Jerry Wexler

Chris Connor chronology
This Is Chris (1955)	Chris Connor (1956)	He Loves Me, He Loves Me Not (1956)

Chris Connor is an album by jazz singer Chris Connor. Atlantic Records released the album, Connor's first for the label, in April 1956. The recording was Atlantic's first jazz vocal LP record.

== Recording ==
The tracks appearing on Chris Connor were recorded over the course of three sessions. The first of these occurred on January 19, 1956, with a small orchestra accompanying Connor, using arrangements by Ralph Burns. On January 23, Connor was accompanied by a quartet led by pianist John Lewis with Oscar Pettiford on bass. On February 8, Connor's accompanists included Nick Travis, Zoot Sims and Milt Hinton, with arrangements by Burns. The album comprises four tracks from each recording session.

== Release and critical reception ==
Professional ratings
Review scores
Source	Rating
The Penguin Guide to Jazz	(Core Collection)
allmusic	4.5/5 stars

Chris Connor was released by Atlantic in April 1956. Billboard gave it a favorable review, praising Connor's "warm and savvy" vocals throughout the product. The Penguin Guide to Jazz includes Chris Connor in its "Core Collection", and assigns it a four-star rating (of a possible four), noting that " 'Ev'ry Time', 'It's All Right With Me', 'I Wonder What Became Of Me', and several more are unlikely to be bettered". John Bush, writing for allmusic, calls the album one of Connor's best, giving the album a rating of four-and-a-half stars (of a possible five).

== Track listing ==
No.	Title	Writer(s)	Arranger	Length
1.	"I Get a Kick Out of You"	Cole Porter	John Lewis	1:50
2.	"Something to Live For"	Duke Ellington, Billy Strayhorn	Ralph Burns	3:13
3.	"Get Out of Town"	Cole Porter	Burns	3:04
4.	"Where Are You?"	Jimmy McHugh, Harold Adamson	Lewis	3:32
5.	"Anything Goes"	Cole Porter	Burns	2:11
6.	"When the Wind Was Green"	Don Hunt	Burns	3:24
7.	"He Was Too Good to Me"	Richard Rodgers, Lorenz Hart	Burns	3:41
8.	"You Make Me Feel So Young"	Josef Myrow, Mack Gordon	Burns	2:46
9.	"Everytime"	Ralph Blane, Hugh Martin	Lewis	3:47
10.	"Way Out There"	George Wallington, Buddy Goodman	Burns	2:27
11.	"My April Heart"	George Wallington, Buddy Goodman	Burns	2:41
12.	"Almost Like Being in Love"	Frederick Loewe, Alan Lerner	Lewis	2:09

== Personnel ==
On "Something to Live For", "When the Wind Was Green", "He Was Too Good to Me" and "My April Heart" (recorded January 19, 1956):

- Chris Connor – vocals
- 19-piece orchestra (Ralph Burns, conductor)

On "I Get a Kick Out of You", "Where Are You?", "Everytime" and "Almost Like Being in Love" (recorded January 23, 1956):

- Chris Connor – vocals
- John Lewis – piano
- Barry Galbraith – guitar
- Oscar Pettiford – bass
- Connie Kay – drums

On "Get Out of Town", "Anything Goes", "You Make Me Feel So Young", and "Way Out There" (recorded February 8, 1956):

- Chris Connor – vocals
- Nick Travis – trumpet
- Zoot Sims – tenor saxophone; solo on "Way Out There"
- Al Young, Sam Marovitz, Ray Beckenstein, Danny Banks – saxophones
- Moe Wechsler – piano
- Barry Galbraith – guitar
- Milton Hinton – bass
- Osie Johnson – drums
