= Brian Rolland =

American songwriter

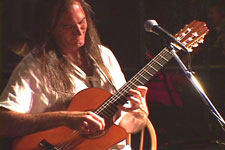
- Brian Rolland in concert

Background information
- Born: Brian Parks Rolland; April 16, 1954
- Origin: Cambridge, Massachusetts, U.S.
- Died: April 14, 2018
- Genres: Acoustic, jazz, world, rock
- Occupation: Singer-songwriter
- Instrument: Guitar
- Years active: 1968–2018
- Labels: On the Full Moon, Wumat
- Website: www.brianrolland.com

Brian Rolland (April 16, 1954 - April 14, 2018) was an American guitarist, composer, and songwriter raised in Cambridge, Massachusetts. His instrumental sound is characterized by a mix of Latin and North American guitar styles.

== Background ==
Starting out on the piano and clarinet as a child, switching to folk guitar at age 12, and continuing as a largely self-taught blues and rock player, Rolland moved into formal training in jazz through summer programs and lessons at New England Conservatory and Berklee School of Music while attending Cambridge Rindge and Latin high school. His first live performance was at age 14 with a rock band at the Club Casablanca in Harvard Square. Youthful influences included frequenting the Club 47 and The Boston Tea Party in the later 1960s, and an appearance at the 1976 Montreux Jazz Festival backing jazz trumpeter Clark Terry in a big band setting.

His father was an amateur piano and cornet player from Hannibal, Missouri who, as a teenager in the early 1940s, moonlighted playing jazz on Mississippi riverboats, before moving East with his mother after World War II to attend Harvard Medical School under the GI Bill.

Rolland studied classical theory and composition with Douglas Leedy at Reed College, then completed a B.A. degree at the University of New Hampshire, where he studied under Mark DeVoto and graduated in 1977.

He resumed recording with the release of a solo guitar album, Long Night's Moon (2000), followed by Dreams of Brazil (2002/2006), and The Tide's In (2007/2008).

The Tide's In was named in Zone Music Reporter's "Top 100 Airplay Chart for 2008" at #3, was nominated for "Best Instrumental Album – Acoustic" at the New Age Reporter Awards in 2006, peaked at #12 on Zone Music Reporter's "New Age / Ambient / World" charts in April 2006 and at #3 in April 2008.

The single "Doliber's Cove" spent 28 weeks on Sirius Satellite's "Top 10 New Age Singles" chart, from early May to mid-October 2008, reaching #1.

Awards include an Honorable Mention in the 2008 International Songwriting Competition for his instrumental single "Catch Me If You Can".

== Discography ==
- The Tide's In (2007/2008)
- Dreams of Brazil (2002/2006)
- Long Night's Moon (2000)
