= Charles DeForest =

American jazz singer, pianist and composer (1924–1996)

Charles DeForest (1924 in Genoa, New York - July 1996 in New York City) was an American jazz singer, pianist and composer. He was described by The New York Times as a "quintessential New York saloon performer" with a "quietly intimate" style. During his 44-year career in New York City he performed in venues such as Peacock Alley at the Waldorf Astoria, the Edwardian Room at the Plaza Hotel and The Blue Angel club, and in his last years Ted Hook's Backstage and Danny's Grand Sea Palace, the latter where he was the resident pianist for three years before his death. He was a featured vocalist for Benny Goodman's orchestra.

DeForest was prolific as a songwriter. Tony Bennett cited him as his current favourite songwriter during a 1991 concert, comparing him to Cole Porter. Bennett included three of DeForest's songs on his 1990 album for Columbia, Astoria: Portrait of the Artist, including DeForest's signature tune "When Do the Bells Ring for Me?", "Where Do You Go from Love?" and "I've Come Home Again". DeForest's songs were also recorded by George Shearing, Sylvia Syms, Blossom Dearie, Chris Connor and numerous other artists.

DeForest was awarded by the Mabel Mercer Foundation in 1992 and the Manhattan Association of Cabarets in 1994 and 1995.
