= Chris Connor Sings Lullabys of Birdland =

Studio album by Chris Connor
- Released: October 1954; November 1956
- Genre: Jazz; cool jazz
- Label: Bethlehem

Chris Connor chronology
Chris Connor Sings Lullabys of Birdland (1954)	Chris Connor Sings Lullabys for Lovers (1954)

Singles from Chris Connor Sings Lullabys of Birdland
- 1. "Lullaby of Birdland" Released: September 1954

Chris Connor Sings Lullabys for Lovers is a studio album by American singer, Chris Connor. The album was originally released with eight tracks in October 1954 by Bethlehem Records before being reissued with 14 tracks by the label in November 1956. It was the debut studio album in Connor's career and helped established the Bethlehem company. The disc featured ballads recorded in the popular jazz sub-genre of cool jazz such as the title tune and "Spring Is Here". It received mostly positive responses from critics in the years that followed.

== Background ==
Chris Connor found success in the 1950s as the lead vocalist for Stan Kenton's orchestra. She then embarked on a solo career signing with Bethlehem Records and was considered at her peak with albums like Chris Connor Sings Lullabys of Birdland. The album was inspired by the newly-popular sub-genre of cool jazz. The Bethlehem label was newly-established and was struggling to make ends meet. Bethlehem producer Creed Taylor believed the answer to company's success was recording an album of cool jazz. He then chose Connor as the singer for the label's first album of cool jazz.

== Recording and content ==
Chris Connor Sings Lullabys for Lovers was recorded with Connor on lead vocals alongside the Ellis Larkins Trio. His trio consisted of Larkins on piano, Everett Barksdale on guitar and Beverley Peel on bass. The original release of the product only featured eight tracks. The album contained a collection of ballads all performed in the cool jazz style. Among its tunes was the title track, "Lullaby of Birdland", along with "Come Back to Sorrento" and "Spring Is Here". A reissued version two years later featured 14 tracks, including the original eight songs and six more featuring Sy Oliver's orchestra. Among the added tracks were early songs recorded by Connor prior to the release of the album like "Blue Silhouette".

== Release, singles and critical reception ==
Professional ratings
Review scores
Source	Rating
AllMusic	4/5 stars
DownBeat	3/5 stars

Chris Connor Sings Lullabys of Birdland was originally released in October 1954 by Bethlehem and was first offered as a 10-inch LP. It featured four tracks on both sides. The reissued version was released by Bethlehem in November 1956 as a full vinyl LP and featured seven songs on each side of the disc. The title track was spawned as the only single from the original disc in September 1954.

The album was met mostly with critical acclaim. DownBeat gave the product three stars in 1954 and called it "a winning debut" for Connor and found she performed "in fine beat and phrases like an instrument". Cash Box praised Connor on the album, writing, "If you’d like to hear one of the tops in jazz singing, then you've just gotta listen to this Chris Connor album." AllMusic's Scott Yanow reviewed the 1956 version and rated it four out of five stars: "Connor, who was 26 at this time, is in top form in all of the different settings and displays a wider range than one might expect." Will Friedwald of the book A Biographical Guide to the Great Jazz and Pop Singers liked the original LP rather than the 1956 version for pairing "exquisite standards" with "woofers".

== Track listing ==
=== 10-inch version ===
Side one
No.	Title	Writer(s)	Length
1.	"I Hear Music"	Burton Lane; Frank Loesser	2:22
2.	"What Is There to Say?"	Vernon Duke; E.Y. "Yip" Harburg	2:55
3.	"Come Back to Sorrento"	Ernesto de Curtis	2:47
4.	"Why Shouldn't I?"	Cole Porter	2:46

Side two
No.	Title	Writer(s)	Length
1.	"Lullaby of Birdland"	George Shearing	2:25
2.	"Try a Little Tenderness"	Jimmy Campbell; Reg Connelly; Henry Woods	3:05
3.	"All About Ronnie"	Joe Green	3:00
4.	"Spring Is Here"	Rodgers and Hart	2:57

=== 12-inch version ===
Side one
No.	Title	Writer(s)	Length
1.	"Lullaby of Birdland"	Shearing	2:25
2.	"What Is There to Say?"	Duke; Harburg	2:55
3.	"Try a Little Tenderness"	Campbell; Connelly; Woods	3:05
4.	"Spring Is Here"	Rodgers and Hart	2:57
5.	"Why Shouldn't I?"	Porter	2:46
6.	"Ask Me"	Mark Pollard; Woody Hinderling	2:48
7.	"Blue Silhouette"	Jack Val; Jimmy Dale; Murray Semos	2:47

Side two
No.	Title	Writer(s)	Length
1.	"Chiquita From Chi-Wah-Wah"	Benny Bonnacio; Jimmy Franklin; Jimmy LaMarge	2:50
2.	"A Cottage for Sale"	Willard Robison; Larry Conley	2:37
3.	"How Long Has This Been Going On"	George Gershwin; Ira Gershwin	2:35
4.	"Stella by Starlight"	Ned Washington; Victor Young	2:29
5.	"Gone with the Wind"	Allie Wrubel; Herb Magidson	2:22
6.	"He's Coming Home"	Charles DeForest	2:45
7.	"Goodbye"	Gordon Jenkins	2:35

== Personnel ==
All credits are adapted from the 10-inch LP version of Chris Connor Sings Lullabys of Birdland.

- Everett Barksdale – Guitar
- Chris Connor – Vocals
- Bill Coss – Liner notes
- Bob Garrity – Performer (introduction on A1)
- Ellis Larkins – Piano
- Beverly Peer – Bass

== Release history ==
Release history and formats for Chris Connor Sings Lullabys of Birdland
Region	Date	Format	Label	Ref.
Various	October 1954	10-inch vinyl LP	Bethlehem	
Various	November 1956	12-inch vinyl LP	Bethlehem	
United Kingdom	1959	12-inch vinyl LP	Parlophone	
Various	1973–1992	12-inch vinyl LP	Bethlehem; Polydor	
Various	1986–2024	Compact disc (CD)	Bethlehem; Charly; Avenue Jazz; Jazz Heritage; Solid; Ultra-Vybe	
Various	Circa 2020	Digital download; streaming	AVID Ltd.	
