= Enzo Nini =

- Born: 29 August 1954 (age 71); San Giorgio a Cremano, Italy
- Genres: Jazz
- Occupations: Musician, composer, arranger
- Instruments: Tenor saxophone, flute
- Website: www.enzonini.it

Enzo Nini (born 29 August 1954) is a jazz saxophonist and flautist. He was born in San Giorgio a Cremano, Naples, Italy.

== Music career ==
While playing Neapolitan traditional music, begun in 1979, Nini played in festivals and shows in Toronto, Montreal, Vienna, and Berlin.

He has appeared on Italian television (Domenica in, Cantagiro, Capodanno RAI 1) and radio (Notturno italiano, Audiobox, Radio3 Suite) as a saxophonist, composer, and arranger. He has composed music for theatrical productions and film scores. He starred as a soloist in pop music shows, participating in the Soul Brothers Band tour of Enzo Avitabile in the Tunisi Amphitheatre (1992). He played at the Carrefour de la Mediterraneé in Salonicco (1991) in the orchestra of the show La Réve de Kokò at the Les Halles auditorium of Paris and at the Reggia di Caserta playing Paolo di Sarcina music (1993).

Under the direction of maestro Renato Piemontese, he was a soloist in the Media Aetas group for the Roberto De Simone show Rosa del Ciel (Palermo, 2000). Nini played in the theatrical orchestra of Raffaele Viviani's Eden Teatro in the 2002–2003 Roberto De Simone version for the reopening of the Trianòn Theatre of Naples.

=== With Linea d'Ombra ===
Nini participated in the "Premio Diaristico Pieve S. Stefano" (Pieve Santo Stefano, Arezzo, Italy, 1998). He played, composed, and prepared the musical reading festival "Il suono dei poeti" for the Literary Coffee "Intra Moenia" of Naples (1998–99). He composed and performed music for the concerts "Suoni e Parole da Giacomo Leopardi" at the Chiostro di S.Patrizia (Naples, 1999) at the theatre La Perla (Agnano, Naples, 1999) at the Sannino auditorium (Ponticelli, Naples, 1999) in the La Valle dell'Orso amphitheatre to close the celebrations of "Leopardi in Campania" (Torre del Graco, Naples, 2000). In the show "La sagra del 99" with Eleonora Puntillo, he played at Villa Campolieto (Ercolano, Italy, 1999), at the Certosa di Padula (Padula, Salerno 1999), and in "Sala della Loggia" at the Maschio Angioino Castle for the "Marzo Donna" festival (Naples, 2000).

He wrote music and played for the show "L'Orologio Federico" at San Giorgio a Cremano, concluding the week of studies on Federico Fellini with the poet Mariano Baino and the actor Antonello Cossia (Naples, 1999).

At the Arenile di Bagnoli (Naples), he played, composed, and prepared the festival "Armi Improprie" with Enzo Gragnaniello, Marcello Colasurdo, Renato Carpentieri and the lawyer Vincenzo Siniscalchi (1999). With poet Mariano Bàino at the Maschio Angioino, he participated in Napoli Poesia (2000). He played at the Literary Park Giordano Bruno of Nola Naples "Una poesia per Gerusalemme", interacting with poets Muhammad Hanza Jhanien, Ronny Someck, and Fausta Squatriti, introduced by Roberto De Simone (2002).

At the theatre Garibaldi of Bisceglie (Bari): "L'Incanto Muore Senza Lutti" – Gossip for Luciano Berio with Roberto De Simone, Edoardo Sanguineti, and Carmine Lubrano, music and elaboration of the text edited by Enzo Nini commissioned for the death of Luciano Berio (2003).

He performed at Maschio Angioino Castle of Naples for Camillo Capolongo with Wanda Marasco, for the show "Cangiullo and Campana" with Tonino Taiuti, and "Carmina Foemine" with Wanda Marasco, Linda Santojanni, and Monica Ventra.

At Galleria Morra of Naples: 20 May, he performed Sfinimondo di Nanni Balestrini with Raffaele Rizzo (2004).

=== With the Aladin Association ===
- Enzo Nini played his music for "Voci Dissonanti – La Dispensa della Follia" with Bruno Tommaso and Marcello Colasurdo (Rome, 2001).
- Passaggio a Trieste with the writer Fabrizia Ramondino and psychiatrist Assunta Signorelli (Naples, 2001).
- "Global no-global – La Stanza sull'Acqua" at the Elsa Morante Prize (Bacoli Naples, 2001).
- "Fermenti" at the Artists Club of Rome with Mimmo Napolitano and Patrizia del Vasco (2001).
- "I misteri della Napoli sotterranea" and "la Rivoluzione del 1799" at the Kulturbrauerei theatre of Berlin (8/9 June 2002).
- "Cantos desde Partenope" and "Neruda en el Corazon" at Castel Sant'Elmo in occasion of 50° Premio Napoli (2004), with Patrizia Del Vasco, Marcello Colasurdo, Maurizio Villa and the participation of the Madrilenian singer Amancio Prada.
- At the Sibilla Cumana Cavern of Bacoli for the "Itinerari della Psiche" during the AIPA (Italian Association of Psychology Analytics meeting, 2004) with Patrizia di Vasco, Marcello Colasurdo, and the Tammorre Vesuviane.

== Discography ==
=== Solo ===
- Quartieri Spagnoli (Officina Edizioni Musicali, 1990)
- Doppio Sogno Doppio (Polosud, 1997)

=== With others ===
- Kammermuzak, Paolo Di Sarcina (PoloSud, 1996)
- Veleno (PoloSud, 2002)
- I Flautisti Jazz Italiani, FA.LA.UT (Falaut, 2002)
- Miracolo, Balcanija (Il Manifesto, 2003)
- Lettere da Orsara, Orchestra Jazz a Majella directed by Bruno Tommaso (PoloSud, 2003)
- Specula & Gemini, Orchestra Jazz a Majella (SuonidelSud & RAI Trade, 2004)
- Contrappunti in Utopia, ALADIN, Poems in Music by Vittorio Russo – Book and CD (Pironti, 2005)
