= This Is Chris =

Studio album by Chris Connor
- Released: August 1955
- Recorded: April 1955
- Genre: Jazz
- Label: Bethlehem

Chris Connor chronology
Chris Connor Sings Lullabys for Lovers (1955)	This Is Chris (1955)	Chris Connor (1956)

This Is Chris is a studio album by American singer, Chris Connor. It was released in August 1955 by Bethlehem Records and was her third studio product. The 10-track collection consisted of jazz recordings, including four penned by Cole Porter. It received positive reviews from Cash Box, DownBeat and AllMusic.

== Background, recording and content ==
Chris Connor found success in the jazz field during the 1950s and was one of the first successful performers signed to Bethlehem Records. Her debut album for the label was released in 1954 titled Chris Connor Sings Lullabys for Lovers. This was followed by several more Bethlehem products over the next few years, including This Is Chris. The album was recorded in April 1955 alongside the label's consistent session musicians including pianist Ralph Sharon and trombonist J. J. Johnson. This Is Chris consisted of ten tracks, including four composed by Cole Porter: "It's All Right with Me", "I Concentrate on You", "From This Moment On" and "Ridin' High".

== Release and critical reception ==
This Is Chris was released in August 1955 by Bethlehem Records and was her third album for the label. The album received a positive critical reception. Cash Box praised her vocal performance, writing, "Miss Connor’s obvious feeling for the lyric and her perfectly controlled vocal mannerisms have resulted in excellent sales. This should be an album to be stocked immediately and in ample numbers." DownBeat believed it to be her best album to date and believed that once she "becomes this consistent in a night club, she'll really have it made." Allmusic's Scott Yanow gave it four out of five stars praised her voice and several tracks: "Connor's cool tone, subtle, emotional delivery and haunting voice were perfect for the music of the 1950s. Highlights of this superior set include "The Thrill Is Gone," "Blame It on My Youth," and "I Concentrate on You," but all ten numbers are rewarding."

== Track listing ==
Side one
No.	Title	Writer(s)	Length
1.	"Blame It on My Youth"	Edward Heyman; Oscar Levant	2:39
2.	"It's All Right with Me"	Cole Porter	2:28
3.	"Someone to Watch Over Me"	George and Ira Gershwin	3:11
4.	"Trouble Is a Man"	Alec Wilder	2:53
5.	"All This and Heaven Too"	Eddie DeLange; Jimmy Van Heusen	3:29

Side two
No.	Title	Writer(s)	Length
1.	"The Thrill Is Gone"	Lew Brown; Ray Henderson	2:47
2.	"I Concentrate on You"	Porter	3:30
3.	"All Dressed Up with a Broken Heart"	Claude Reese; Fred Patrick; Jack Val	1:51
4.	"From This Moment On"	Porter	2:30
5.	"Ridin' High"	Porter	4:14

== Personnel ==
All credits are adapted from the liner notes of This Is Chris.

- Chris Connor – Vocals
- Tom Dowd – Engineer
- Burt Goldblatt – Photography (cover design)
- Milt Hinton – Bass
- Shirley Hoskie Collins – Liner notes
- J. J. Johnson – Trombone
- Osie Johnson – Drums
- Herbie Mann – Flute
- Joe Puma – Guitar
- Ralph Sharon – Piano
- Kai Winding – Trombone

== Release history ==
Release history and formats for This Is Chris
Region	Date	Format	Label	Ref.
North America	August 1955	LP mono	Bethlehem	
Various	1956	LP mono; 10" LP	Bethlehem	
Japan	1960–1992	LP	Bethlehem; Polydor	
Various	1986–2024	Compact disc (CD)	Bethlehem; CTI; Solid; Ultra Vybe	
Various	1990–2014	LP	Bethlehem; Fresh Sound	
