= Chris Connor =

American jazz singer (1927–2009)

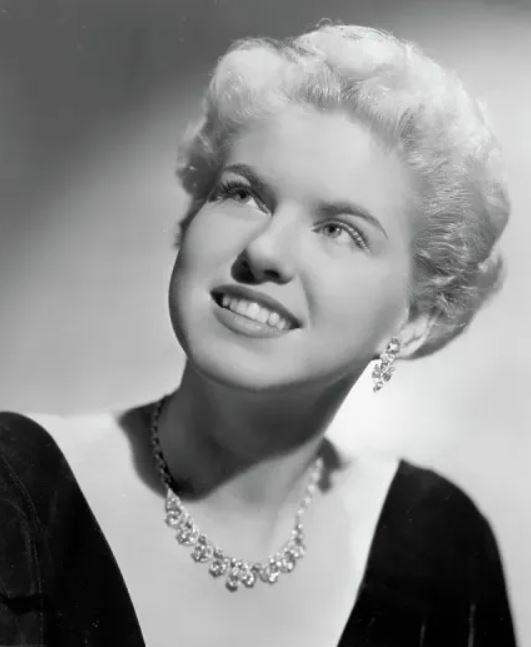
- Chris Connor, circa 1950.
- Born: Mary Jean Loutsenhizer; November 8, 1927; Kansas City, Missouri, U.S.
- Died: August 29, 2009 (aged 81); Toms River, New Jersey, U.S.
- Occupation: Singer
- Years active: 1949–2009
- Works: Discography
- Partner: Lori Muscarelle
- Musical career
- Genres: Vocal jazz; cool jazz
- Instrument: Vocals
- Labels: Bethlehem; Atlantic; Roulette; FM; ABC–Paramount; Stanyan; CBS–Sony; Progressive; Lob; Stash; Eastworld; Contemporary; Alfa; HighNote

Mary Jean Loutsenhizer, known professionally as Chris Connor (November 8, 1927 – August 29, 2009), was an American jazz singer.

== Early life ==
Mary Jean Loutsenhizer was born on November 8, 1927 in Kansas City Missouri. Her mother was a housewife while her father was a telegraphist for Western Union who taught Mary Jean how to use Morse Code. She was raised alongside her elder sister, Fran, who was eight years older. Mary Jean enjoyed singing from an early age with her sister and performed before a live audience for the first time in a school play where she sang in Spanish. At age 13, the family relocated to Jefferson City, Missouri and she later attended high school where she was first clarinet in their band. In an interview with Jazz Wax, she told Marc Myers that playing the instrument taught her how to read music and learn about breath control. However, Mary Jean had intentions of becoming a singer instead.

Mary Jean continued singing, including a successful performance at a junior college graduation in 1945. In her teens, she took on the gender-neutral stage name of Chris Connor. Following high school graduation, she took a job singing with a big band at the University of Missouri led by Paul Cherches. Cherches had arrangements of songs by Stan Kenton and his orchestra, whom she had aspired to sing with. She also played night-time gigs with friend, Bob Brookmeyer while working as a secretary in Jefferson City during the day-time. With her sets sight on becoming successful, she moved to New York City in 1949. She was informed by a road manager that Claude Thornhill was auditioning female singers. Thornhill liked her voice and had her join his new singing group, The Snowflakes.

== Career ==
=== 1949–1954: Big band beginnings and solo recordings with Bethlehem Records ===
Connor recorded only one session as a Snowflakes member, cutting a cover of "There's a Small Hotel" in 1949. Thornhill's group got increasingly less gigs as the 1950s progressed and the group was going to break up. After hearing that clarinetist, Jerry Wald, was looking for a lead singer, she joined his band in the spring of 1952. She cut four sides with Wald's orchestra, including her first single titled "You're the Cream in My Coffee". She was heard on the radio in 1952 by Stan Kenton's vocalist, June Christy, who recommended her to Kenton to replace her. Connor joined Kenton's orchestra for their 1953 recording sessions where she cut several selections, among them being "All About Ronnie", a song she has since been identified with. Four more recordings featured Connor's voice with Kenton's band until she left the group later that year. According to Connor, she became exhausted by the band's touring schedule that included one-night engagements with 300 miles between dates.

Connor took some time off following her departure and acquired a new manager named Monte Kay. He arranged for a solo gig at New York City's Birdland jazz club where she was heard by Bethlehem Records president, Gus Wildi. In an effort to keep his struggling label afloat, Wildi signed Connor to Bethlehem as their first proper jazz artist. Connor's first recordings were pop novelty singles such as "Miser's Serenade" and "Chiquita From Chi-Wah-Wah". The latter was described by biographer Will Friedwald as "perhaps the worst thing she ever sang". Connor herself did not like the songs, telling Jazz Wax, "The 78's were a kick but they weren't taking advantage of my singing personality."

Connor's then recorded her debut album with jazz pianist, Ellis Larkins, titled Chris Connor Sings Lullabys of Birdland. Released in 1954, the album became a critical and commercial success, bringing Bethlehem to notoriety and launching Connor's solo career. DownBeat and Cash Box magazines praised Connor's vocals throughout the project. Her second studio LP, Chris Connor Sings Lullabys for Lovers, featured Vinnie Burke's quartet and was released in late 1954. It was followed in 1955 by This Is Chris, which featured more session musicians than her previous two Bethlehem projects. Connor theorized that her Bethlehem albums were successful for their minimal use of instruments that allowed listeners to take in her vocals and get all "clutter" out of the background.

=== Later recordings ===
She made her final recordings for HighNote: Haunted Heart in 2001 and Everything I Love in 2003.

Billboard reported in 1955 that Connor's first two solo albums for Bethlehem, Sings Lullabys of Birdland and Sings Lullabys for Lovers, ranked No. 1 and No. 2 on the jazz chart for the week ending April 23, 1955. In 1957, she ranked No. 10 in the Favorite Female Vocalist disk jockey popularity poll behind Lena Horne and June Christy.

== Death ==
A resident of Toms River, New Jersey, Connor died there from cancer on August 29, 2009, at the age of 81. Her longtime partner was her manager, Lori Muscarelle.

== Discography ==
- Chris Connor Sings Lullabys of Birdland (Bethlehem, 1954)
- Chris Connor Sings Lullabys for Lovers (Bethlehem, 1954)
- This Is Chris (Bethlehem, 1955)
- Chris Connor (Atlantic, 1956)
- He Loves Me, He Loves Me Not (Atlantic, 1956)
- I Miss You So (Atlantic, 1957)
- Chris Connor Sings the George Gershwin Almanac of Song (Atlantic, 1957)
- Chris (Bethlehem, 1957)
- Chris Craft (Atlantic, 1958)
- A Jazz Date with Chris Connor (Atlantic, 1958)
- Sings Ballads of the Sad Cafe (Atlantic, 1959)
- Witchcraft (Atlantic, 1959)
- Chris in Person (Atlantic, 1959)
- A Portrait of Chris (Atlantic, 1960)
- Two's Company with Maynard Ferguson (Roulette, 1961)
- Double Exposure with Maynard Ferguson (Atlantic, 1961)
- Free Spirits (Atlantic, 1962)
- At the Village Gate: Early Show/Late Show (FM, 1963)
- A Weekend in Paris (FM, 1964)
- Sings Gentle Bossa Nova (ABC-Paramount, 1965)
- Chris Conner Now! (ABC 1966)
- Sketches (Stanyan, 1972)
- the Finest of Chris Connor (Bethlehem, 1975)
- Sweet and Swinging (Progressive, 1978)
- Live (Applause, 1983)
- Three Pearls with Ernestine Anderson, Carol Sloane (Eastworld, 1984)
- Love Being Here with You (Stash, 1984)
- Classic (Contemporary, 1987)
- New Again (Contemporary, 1988)
- As Time Goes by (Enja, 1991)
- Angel Eyes (Alfa, 1991)
- The London Connection (Audiophile, 1993)
- Haunted Heart (HighNote, 2001)
- I Walk with Music (HighNote, 2002)
- Everything I Love (HighNote, 2003)
