= Sammy Davis Jr. at Town Hall =

Live album by Sammy Davis Jr.
- Released: 1959
- Recorded: May 4, 1958
- Venue: The Town Hall, New York City
- Genre: Vocal jazz, traditional pop
- Length: 38:27
- Label: Decca, Coral
- Producer: Lee Cooley

Sammy Davis Jr. chronology
All the Way... and Then Some! (1958)	Sammy Davis Jr. at Town Hall (1959)	Porgy and Bess (1959)

Professional ratings
Review scores
Source	Rating
Allmusic	3/5 stars

Sammy Davis Jr. at Town Hall is a 1959 live album by Sammy Davis Jr., recorded at The Town Hall in Manhattan.

== Track listing ==
1. "Something's Gotta Give" (Johnny Mercer) – 1:35
2. "And This Is My Beloved" (Robert Wright, George Forrest) – 2:20
3. "Hey There" (Richard Adler, Jerry Ross) – 2:00
4. "My Funny Valentine" (Richard Rodgers, Lorenz Hart) – 2:06
5. "It's All Right with Me" (Cole Porter) – 5:40
6. "But Not For Me" (George Gershwin, Ira Gershwin) – 3:10
7. "Ethel, Baby" (Jerry Bock, Larry Holofcener, George David Weiss) – 2:00
8. "Too Close for Comfort" (Jerry Bock, Larry Holofcener, Weiss) – 1:20
9. "My Heart Is So Full Of You" (Frank Loesser) – 3:22
10. "Ol' Man River" (Jerome Kern, Oscar Hammerstein II) – 3:37
11. "Chicago" (Fred Fisher) – 1:45
12. "How High the Moon" (Nancy Hamilton, Morgan Lewis) – 5:04
13. Impersonations: "Nature Boy"/"Because of You" (eden ahbez/Arthur Hammerstein, Dudley Wilkinson) – 3:43

== Personnel ==
- Sammy Davis Jr. – vocals
- Morty Stevens – arranger, conductor
