= What Kind of Fool Am I and Other Show-Stoppers =

Studio album by Sammy Davis Jr.
- Released: October 1962
- Genre: Show tunes; Vocal jazz
- Length: 37:43
- Label: Reprise

Sammy Davis Jr. chronology
The Sammy Davis Jr. All-Star Spectacular (1962)	What Kind of Fool Am I and Other Show-Stoppers (1962)	Sammy Davis Jr. at the Cocoanut Grove (1963)

Singles from What Kind of Fool Am I and Other Show-Stoppers
- 1. "What Kind of Fool Am I?" Released: August 19, 1962; 2. "Someone Nice Like You" Released: May 18, 1962

What Kind of Fool Am I and Other Show-Stoppers is a 1962 studio album by Sammy Davis Jr.

== Reception ==
Professional ratings
Review scores
Source	Rating
Allmusic	4/5 stars

Riding off the success of the title single which was at No. 18 on the Billboard Hot 100 after 8 weeks on the chart, the album entered the Billboard Top LPs chart at No. 82 in the end of October 1962. It peaked at No. 14, staying on the chart for 22 weeks, the last of which was the week Davis' 1963 live album Sammy Davis Jr. at the Cocoanut Grove entered the Top LPs chart.

Lindsay Planer on AllMusic praised the album for "accentuating [Davis'] undeniable talent and presence," and noted that it was one of the most well-received albums he released during the 1960s.

== Track listing ==
No.	Title	Writer(s)	Musical	Length
1.	"What Kind of Fool Am I?"	Newley, Bricusse	from Stop the World - I Want to Get Off	3:24
2.	"Once in a Lifetime"	Newley, Bricusse	from Stop the World - I Want to Get Off	2:11
3.	"A Lot of Livin' to Do"	Charles Strouse, Lee Adams	from Bye Bye Birdie	2:47
4.	"Begin the Beguine"	Cole Porter	from Jubilee	4:32
5.	"Can't We Be Friends?"	Kay Smith, Paul James	from The Little Show	3:00
6.	"Something's Coming"	Leonard Bernstein, Stephen Sondheim	from West Side Story	2:51
7.	"Gonna Build a Mountain"	Newley, Bricusse	from Stop the World - I Want to Get Off	2:25
8.	"Someone Nice Like You"	Newley, Bricusse	from Stop the World - I Want to Get Off	2:26
9.	"Too Close for Comfort"	Jerry Bock, George David Weiss, Larry Holofcener	from Mr. Wonderful	3:03
10.	"My Romance"	Richard Rodgers, Lorenz Hart	from Jumbo	3:34
11.	"Thou Swell"	Rodgers, Hart	from A Connecticut Yankee	3:04
12.	"Lost in the Stars"	Kurt Weill, Maxwell Anderson	from Lost in the Stars	4:26

== Personnel ==
- Sammy Davis Jr. – vocals
- Marty Paich – arranger, conductor
