= Guess Who's Sleeping in My Bed? =

- Genre: Comedy
- Based on: Six Weeks in August by Pamela Herbert Chais
- Written by: Pamela Herbert Chais
- Directed by: Theodore J. Flicker
- Starring: Barbara Eden; Dean Jones; Ken Mars; Susanne Benton; Todd Lookinland
- Music by: Morton Stevens
- Country of origin: United States
- Original language: English

Production
- Producer: Mark Carliner
- Cinematography: John A. Alonzo
- Editor: John A. Martinelli
- Running time: 74 minutes
- Production companies: ABC Circle Films

Original release
- Network: ABC
- Release: October 31, 1973

Guess Who's Sleeping in My Bed? is a 1973 American made-for-television comedy film starring Barbara Eden and Dean Jones, directed by Theodore J. Flicker from a teleplay written by Pamela Herbert Chais based on her play Six Weeks in August. It originally premiered as the ABC Movie of the Week on October 31, 1973.

== Plot ==
Francine Gregory is a divorced woman whose charming, vagabond, penniless ex-husband George brings hilarity and havoc into her life when he moves into her house with his new wife, baby, and dog during his annual summer visit.

== Cast ==
- Barbara Eden as Francine Gregory
- Dean Jones as George Gregory
- Ken Mars as Mitchell Bernard
- Susanne Benton as Chloe Gregory
- Todd Lookinland as Adam Gregory
- Reta Shaw as Mrs. Guzmando
- Diana Herbert as Delores
