= As Long as She Needs Me (album) =

Studio album by Sammy Davis Jr.
- Released: 1963
- Recorded: 1963
- Genre: Jazz
- Length: 34:19
- Label: Reprise
- Producer: Jimmy Bowen

Sammy Davis Jr. chronology
I Gotta Right To Swing (1960)	As Long as She Needs Me (1963)	Sammy Davis Jr. at the Cocoanut Grove (1963)

Professional ratings
Review scores
Source	Rating
Allmusic	4/5 stars

As Long as She Needs Me is a 1963 studio album by American singer Sammy Davis Jr., arranged by Marty Paich and Morty Stevens.

== Chart performance ==
The album debuted on Billboard magazine's Top LP's chart in the issue dated May 25, 1963, peaking at No. 73 during a fifteen-week run on the chart.

== Track listing ==
1. "As Long as She Needs Me" (Lionel Bart) – 3:07
2. "Climb Ev'ry Mountain" (from The Sound of Music) (Richard Rodgers, Oscar Hammerstein II) – 3:23
3. "(Love Is) The Tender Trap" (Sammy Cahn, Jimmy Van Heusen) – 2:38
4. "We Kiss in a Shadow" (from The King and I) (Rodgers, Hammerstein II) – 3:21
5. "There Is Nothin' Like a Dame" (from South Pacific) (Rodgers, Hammerstein II) – 2:39
6. "Song from Two for the Seesaw (A Second Chance)" (Dory Langdon, André Previn) – 2:59
7. "Out of This World" (Harold Arlen, Johnny Mercer) – 3:21
8. "Back in Your Own Back Yard" (Dave Dreyer, Al Jolson, Billy Rose) – 2:52
9. "Bye Bye Blackbird" (Mort Dixon, Ray Henderson) – 2:49
10. "Falling in Love With Love" (from The Boys from Syracuse) (Rodgers, Lorenz Hart) – 2:29
11. "Step Out of That Dream" (Phil J. Tuminello, Florence Parker) – 2:32
12. "There Was a Tavern in the Town" (Willam H. Hills) – 2:17

== Personnel ==
Recorded June, 1961:

Tracks 1–12

- Sammy Davis Jr. – vocals
- Marty Paich – arranger
- Morty Stevens – arranger

== Charts ==
Chart (1963)	Peak position
US Billboard Best Selling Monoraul LP's	73
