= Just for Lovers =

Studio album by Sammy Davis Jr.
- Released: 1955
- Recorded: August 15, 1955
- Genre: Vocal jazz
- Length: 40:10
- Label: Decca

Sammy Davis Jr. chronology
Starring Sammy Davis Jr. (1955)	Just for Lovers (1955)	Here's Lookin' at You (1956)

Just for Lovers is the second studio album by Sammy Davis Jr., released in 1955.

An album of romantic ballads, Just for Lovers eschews the comedic impressions of featured on Davis' previous album but ends with Danny Kaye's upbeat song "Happy Ending".

== Reception ==
Professional ratings
Review scores
Source	Rating
AllMusic	3.5/5 stars

The AllMusic review by William Ruhlmann said that Davis's performance on the album showed him "as a ballad singer, he revealed the powerful influence of Billy Eckstine." "Davis broke out at the end with a bravura reading of 'Happy Ending,' here, at least for a couple of minutes, Davis threw in the kind of dynamic elements he so enjoyed showing off in his live performances. Otherwise, this was a surprisingly subdued recording for him."

== Chart performance ==
The album debuted on Billboard magazine's Best-Selling Popular Albums chart in the issue dated October 15, 1955, peaking at No. 5 during a five-week run on the chart.

== Track listing ==
1. "You Do Something to Me" (Cole Porter) - 2:18
2. "You're My Girl" (Sammy Cahn, Jule Styne) - 3:31
3. "Come Rain or Come Shine" (Harold Arlen, Johnny Mercer) - 3:44
4. "Body and Soul" (Edward Heyman, Robert Sour, Frank Eyton, Johnny Green) - 3:44
5. "It's All Right with Me" (Porter) - 6:06
6. "Get Out of Town" (Porter) - 2:47
7. "These Foolish Things (Remind Me of You)" (Harry Link, Holt Marvell, Jack Strachey) - 4:06
8. "When Your Lover Has Gone" (Einar Aaron Swan) - 3:13
9. "The Thrill Is Gone" (Lew Brown, Ray Henderson) - 4:20
10. "Tenderly" (Walter Gross, Jack Lawrence) - 3:44
11. "Happy Ending" (Sylvia Fine) - 2:37

== Personnel ==
- Sammy Davis Jr. – vocals
- Sy Oliver – arranger, conductor
- Morty Stevens

== Charts ==
Chart (1955)	Peak position
US Best-Selling Popular Albums (Billboard)	5
