= It's All Over but the Swingin' =

Studio album by Sammy Davis Jr.
- Released: 1957
- Recorded: July 1–2, 9–10, 1957
- Genre: Jazz
- Length: 43.13
- Label: Decca
- Producer: Lee Gillette

Sammy Davis Jr. chronology
| Sammy Swings (1957) | It's All Over but the Swingin' (1957) | Boy Meets Girl (1957) |

Professional ratings
Review scores
| Source | Rating |
|---|---|
| Allmusic | 3.5/5 stars |

It's All Over but the Swingin is a 1957 album by Sammy Davis Jr., arranged by Jack Pleis and Morty Stevens.

== Track listing ==
1. "Guess I'll Hang My Tears out to Dry" (Sammy Cahn, Jule Styne) – 4:43
2. "But Not for Me" (George Gershwin, Ira Gershwin) – 3:24
3. "Where's That Rainbow?" (Lorenz Hart, Richard Rodgers) – 3:27
4. "I Cover the Waterfront" (Johnny Green, Edward Heyman) – 3:19
5. "Don't Blame Me" (Dorothy Fields, Jimmy McHugh) – 2:52
6. "Better Luck Next Time" (Irving Berlin) – 2:43
7. "Can't Help Lovin' Dat Gal" (Oscar Hammerstein II, Jerome Kern) – 4:53
8. "It Never Entered My Mind" (Hart, Rodgers) – 4:05
9. "Someone to Watch over Me" (G. Gershwin, I. Gershwin) – 3:23
10. "I've Grown Accustomed to Her Face" (Alan Jay Lerner, Frederick Loewe) – 2:47
11. "Spring Is Here" (Hart, Rodgers) – 4:03
12. "I Can't Get Started" (Vernon Duke, I. Gershwin) – 3:29

== Personnel ==
=== Performance ===
- Sammy Davis Jr. – vocal
- Dan Lube, M. Sosson – violin
- Al Dinkin, Paul Robyn – viola
- Eleanor Slatkin – cello
- Harry Klee – flute
- Harry Edison, Conrad Gozzo, Virgil Evans, Mannie Klein – trumpet
- Milt Bernhart, Frank Howard, George Roberts – trombone
- Harry Klein, Ronnie Lang – alto saxophone
- Babe Russin, Don Raffell – tenor saxophone
- Bob Lawson – baritone saxophone
- Roger Renner – piano
- Tony Rizzi, Bob Bain – guitar
- Mort Cobb, Joe Comfort – double bass
- Irving Cottler, Alvin Stoller – drums
- Personnel as listed in the liner notes.
