= Terry Rosen =

- Rosen in 1997

Background information
- Born: Terence Rosen; September 26, 1939; Atlanta, Georgia
- Died: December 30, 1999 (aged 60) Columbia, South Carolina
- Genres: Jazz
- Occupations: Musician, concert promoter, disc jockey
- Instrument: Guitar
- Years active: 1960–1999

Terry Rosen (September 26, 1939 – December 30, 1999) was an American jazz guitarist, concert promoter, and radio DJ.

== Early career ==
Terry Rosen was born in Atlanta, Georgia but moved with his parents to Columbia, South Carolina at the age of three. Picking up the guitar at the age of 14, he began sitting in on bandstands with local musicians in Columbia in 1956; he graduated from Dreher High School in 1957. Shortly after graduation, he left for Los Angeles where he attended the now-defunct Westlake College of Music for two years. In 1960, he befriended a member of the Harry James Big Band who landed him a position in Harry's band for two years. Playing the Vegas- Tahoe club scene, Terry met Sammy Davis Jr. and soon joined his band, appearing on recordings such as Sammy Davis Jr. at the Cocoanut Grove, recorded in 1963. Terry was also the guitarist on a notable series of 1962 live recordings at the New Villa Venice club in Chicago backing Frank Sinatra, Dean Martin and Sammy Davis Jr. (a.k.a. the Rat Pack).

== Later career ==
In the early 1970s, he returned to South Carolina where he attended the University of South Carolina and earned degrees in Media Arts and English. It was at this time that he hosted his first jazz radio show on WUSC-FM. South Carolina Public Radio began programming a weekly syndicated jazz program called "Inside Jazz with Terry Rosen" in 1986. As the show became more popular, it added weeknight broadcasts and expanded its coverage to North Carolina and Georgia. The show was canceled in 1998. Rosen continued playing clubs during those years, inviting young up and coming musicians to perform with his ensemble including saxophonist Chris Potter.

== Death ==
Upon revisiting Columbia prior to New Year's Eve 1999, he was found dead in a room of the Sheraton Hotel on December 30, 1999, after his firearm reportedly discharged accidentally.

== Discography ==
=== As leader ===
- The Columbia Jazz Trio Plus Two with Johnny Helms and Chris Potter (SCETV, 1987)
- The Columbia Jazz Quintet Live at Pug's with Johnny Helms and Chris Potter (Dig This Productions, 1988)

=== As sideman ===
With Sammy Davis Jr.

- Sammy Davis Jr. at the Cocoanut Grove (Reprise, 1963)

With Harry James

- Spectacular Sounds in Color (MGM, 1961)
- Harry James Plays Neal Hefti (MGM, 1962)
- Requests On the Road (MGM, 1962)
- The Solid Gold Trumpet of Harry James (MGM, 1962)
- Double Dixie! (MGM, 1963)
