= Here's Lookin' at You =

Studio album by Sammy Davis, Jr.
- Released: 1956
- Recorded: 1956
- Genre: Vocal jazz
- Length: 36:06
- Label: Decca

Sammy Davis, Jr. chronology
Just for Lovers (1955)	Here's Lookin' at You (1956)	Sammy Swings (1957)

Here's Lookin' at You is the third studio album by Sammy Davis, Jr., released in 1956.

== Reception ==
Professional ratings
Review scores
Source	Rating
Allmusic	3/5 stars

The Allmusic review by William Ruhlmann awarded the album three stars, stating that "most of the 12 songs on the album are second-drawer material at best, and Davis, performing before a horn-filled swing band, turns in professional, but not characteristic performances."

== Track listing ==
1. "It Started All Over Again" (Bill Carey, Carl T. Fischer) – 2:46
2. "She Always Knows" (Imogen Carpenter, Lenny Adelson) – 2:31
3. "Love" (Edmund Goulding, Elsie Janis) – 2:10
4. "A Foggy Day" (Ira Gershwin, George Gershwin) – 3:47
5. "The Clown" (Paul Frees, Ruby Raksin) – 3:19
6. "Just One of Those Things" (Cole Porter) – 2:52
7. "Don't Let Her Go" (Aaron Schroeder, Abner Silver) – 2:58
8. "Give a Fool a Chance" (Jerry Stevens) – 3:04
9. "In a Persian Market" (Albert W. Ketelbey, Mack David) – 2:30
10. "The Nearness Of You" (Hoagy Carmichael, Ned Washington) – 3:40
11. "The World Is Mine (Tonight)" (George Posford, Holt Marvell) – 3:13
12. "The Blues to End the Blues" (Mace Neufeld, Robert Allen, Robert Arthur) – 3:16

== Personnel ==
- Sammy Davis Jr. – vocals
- Sy Oliver – arranger, conductor
- Morty Stevens
