= All the Way... and Then Some! =

All The Way... and Then Some!

Studio album by Sammy Davis Jr.
- Released: 1958
- Recorded: 1958
- Genre: Vocal jazz
- Length: 35:50
- Label: Decca, Brunswick

Sammy Davis Jr. chronology
Mood to Be Wooed (1958)	All The Way... and Then Some! (1958)	Sammy Davis Jr. at Town Hall (1959)

All The Way... and Then Some! is a studio album by Sammy Davis Jr., released in 1958.

== Track listing ==
1. "All the Way" (Jimmy Van Heusen, Sammy Cahn) – 2:59
2. "Look to Your Heart" (Van Heusen, Cahn) – 3:24
3. "Wonder Why" (Nicholas Brodzsky, Cahn) – 2:46
4. "They Can't Take That Away from Me" (Ira Gershwin, George Gershwin) – 2:03
5. "All the Things You Are" (Jerome Kern, Oscar Hammerstein II) – 3:03
6. "In the Still of the Night" (Cole Porter) – 3:27
7. "On a Slow Boat to China" (Frank Loesser) – 2:40
8. "We'll Meet Again" (Ross Parker, Hughie Charles) – 2:50
9. "When I Fall in Love" (Victor Young, Edward Heyman) – 3:29
10. "Stay as Sweet as You Are" (Mack Gordon, Harry Revel) – 3:53
11. "Night and Day" (Porter) – 2:28
12. "I Concentrate on You" (Porter) – 2:48

== Personnel ==
- Sammy Davis Jr. – vocals
- Morty Stevens – conductor (tracks 2, 3, 4, 9, 12)
- Jack Pleis – conductor (track 1)
- Dick Stabile – conductor (tracks 5, 8)
- Russell Garcia – conductor (tracks 6, 7)
- Sonny Burke – conductor (tracks 10, 11)
