= Closest of Friends =

Studio album by Sammy Davis Jr.
- Released: May 1982
- Studios: Sound Emporium (Nashville, Tennessee)
- Genre: Country
- Label: Applause
- Producer: Larry Butler

Closest of Friends is a 1982 album recorded by Sammy Davis Jr. It is his 50th and last original album, released 27 years after his first.

Davis recorded the album in July 1981 at the Sound Emporium in Nashville, Tennessee. It was produced by Larry Butler, and was Davis' first digitally recorded album. Davis stated that the album was "country-flavoured," and promoted the album on Hee Haw.

Davis' version of "Smoke! Smoke! Smoke! (That Cigarette)" was released as a single and hit #89 on the Billboard country charts.

== Track listing ==
1. "What I’ve Got in Mind" – 2:46
2. "Come Sundown" – 3:20
3. "Mention a Mansion" – 2:20
4. "You're Gonna Love Yourself (In The Morning)" – 3:12
5. "Smoke! Smoke! Smoke! (That Cigarette)" – 3:02
6. "Oh Lonesome Me" – 2:38
7. "We Could Have Been the Closest of Friends" – 3:14
8. "(Hey Won't You Play) Another Somebody Done Somebody Wrong Song" – 3:23
9. "Please Don't Tell Me How the Story Ends" – 3:26
10. "The River's Too Wide" – 2:44
