= Poor Devil =

Poor Devil may represent:

- Poor Devil (1940 film), starring Fernando Soler
- Poor Devil (1973 film), starring Sammy Davis Jr.
- Poor Devil (2023 TV series)
