= The Sammy Davis Jr. All-Star Spectacular =

Studio album by Sammy Davis Jr.
- Released: 1962
- Recorded: 1962
- Genre: Vocal jazz
- Length: 38:37
- Label: Reprise

Sammy Davis Jr. chronology
Sammy Davis Jr. Belts the Best of Broadway (1962)	The Sammy Davis Jr. All-Star Spectacular (1962)	What Kind of Fool Am I and Other Show-Stoppers (1962)

The Sammy Davis Jr. All-Star Spectacular is a 1962 studio album by Sammy Davis Jr. arranged by Morty Stevens. The first half of the album features Davis' impersonations of popular entertainers and celebrities.

== Reception ==
Professional ratings
Review scores
Source	Rating
AllMusic	4/5 stars

Lindsay Planer of AllMusic commented that Davis had been recorded "like never before", both as a dynamic vocalist and as an actor of equally impressive proficiency. Planer described the All-Star Spectacular as a unique album, capitalising on Davis' sizable talents as a "seminal master of melody and allowing for a peek into his infectious sense of humor".

== Track listing ==
1. "That Lucky Old Sun" (Haven Gillespie, Beasley Smith) - 3:58 - In the style of Ray Charles and Frankie Laine
2. "Be My Love" (Nicholas Brodszky, Sammy Cahn) - 3:28 - In the style of Mario Lanza and Louis Armstrong
3. "Lulu's Back In Town" (Al Dubin, Harry Warren) - 2:57 - In the style of Mel Tormé and Jerry Lewis
4. "Stranger in Paradise" (Mel Tormé, Robert Wells) - 2:40 - With impersonations of Tony Bennett (with speech impediments) and Billy Eckstine
5. "Ballerina" (Bob Russell, Carl Sigman) - 2:57 - In the style of Huckleberry Hound, Kingfish from Amos 'n' Andy and Nat King Cole NOTE: The rereleased version currently on Spotify is over :30 shorter and omits all impersonations.
6. "Sonny Boy" (Lew Brown, Buddy DeSylva, Ray Henderson, Al Jolson) - 3:34 - With impersonations of Al Jolson (the song's originator), James Cagney, Bela Lugosi, Jimmy Stewart, Dean Martin, Edward G. Robinson, Boris Karloff
7. "I Married an Angel" (Lorenz Hart, Richard Rodgers) - 2:02
8. "Falling in Love Again" (Frederick Hollander, Sammy Lerner) - 3:28
9. "You Can't Love' Em All" (Sammy Cahn, Jimmy Van Heusen) - 3:10
10. "If You Are But a Dream" (Nat Bonx, Jack Fulton, Moe Jaffe) - 2:34
11. "'Deed I Do" (Walter Hirsch, Fred Rose) - 2:14
12. "Without a Song" (Edward Eliscu, Billy Rose, Vincent Youmans) - 3:39

== Personnel ==
- Sammy Davis Jr. – vocals
- Morty Stevens – arranger, conductor
