= Sammy Davis Jr. at the Cocoanut Grove =

Live album by Sammy Davis Jr.
- Released: 1963
- Recorded: December 1962
- Venue: Cocoanut Grove, Los Angeles
- Genre: Vocal jazz, traditional pop
- Length: 42:42
- Label: Reprise
- Producer: Jimmy Bowen

Sammy Davis Jr. chronology
As Long as She Needs Me (1963)	Sammy Davis Jr. at the Cocoanut Grove (1963)	Sammy Davis Jr. Salutes the Stars of the London Palladium (1964)

Professional ratings
Review scores
Source	Rating
Allmusic	4.5/5 stars

Sammy Davis Jr. at the Cocoanut Grove is a 1963 live album by Sammy Davis Jr., recorded at the Cocoanut Grove nightclub in Los Angeles.

== Chart performance ==
The album debuted on Billboard magazine's Top LP's chart in the issue dated March 16, 1963, peaking at No. 96 during a six-week run on the chart.

== Track listing ==
1. Introduction – 0:45
2. "Once in a Lifetime" (Leslie Bricusse, Anthony Newley) – 2:23
3. "In the Still of the Night" (Cole Porter) – 3:46
4. "What Kind of Fool Am I?" (Bricusse, Newley) – 3:11
5. Talk – 1:38
6. "Falling in Love Again" (Frederick Hollander, Sammy Lerner) – 4:00
7. Medley: "I've Got You Under My Skin"/"Big Bad John"/"Night and Day" (Porter)/(Jimmy Dean, Dean Acuff, Roy Acuff)/(Porter) – 6:32
8. Meeting the President – 3:07
9. West Side Story Medley: "Jet Song"/"Something's Coming"/"Cool"/"Tonight"/"America"/"Gee, Office Krupke!"/"Maria" (Leonard Bernstein, Stephen Sondheim) – 4:58
10. Frank Talk – 1:11
11. "River, Stay 'Way from My Door" (Mort Dixon, Harry M. Woods) – 2:30
12. "Me and My Shadow" (Dave Dreyer, Al Jolson, Billy Rose) – 2:37
13. Medley: "Hound Dog"/"What'd I Say" (Jerry Leiber and Mike Stoller/Ray Charles) – 3:39
14. "Rock-a-Bye Your Baby with a Dixie Melody" (Sam M. Lewis, Jean Schwartz, Joe Young) – 10:22
15. Sammy Looks at Old Movies – 4:45
16. Finale: Jam Session ("Sam, by George") (Sammy Davis Jr., George Rhodes) – 10:30
17. Sammy Says Goodnight – 2:15
18. "The Birth of the Blues" (Lew Brown, Buddy DeSylva, Ray Henderson) – 1:31

== Personnel ==
- Sammy Davis Jr.: vocals
- George Rhodes: conductor, arranger, pianist
- Terry Rosen: guitar
- Michael Silva: drums, percussion
- Johnny Mendoza: drums, percussion

== Charts ==
Chart (1963)	Peak position
US Billboard Top LP's (Monoraul)	96
