= Porgy and Bess (Sammy Davis Jr. and Carmen McRae album) =

1959 studio album by Sammy Davis Jr. and Carmen McRae

Studio album by Sammy Davis Jr. and Carmen McRae
- Released: 1959
- Recorded: 1958
- Genre: Jazz, opera, Broadway musical
- Label: Decca DL-8854

Sammy Davis Jr. chronology
Sammy Davis Jr. at Town Hall (1958)	Porgy and Bess (1959)	Sammy Awards (1960)

Carmen McRae chronology
Birds of a Feather (1958)	Porgy and Bess (1959)	Book of Ballads (1959)

Porgy and Bess is a 1959 album by Sammy Davis Jr. of selections from George Gershwin's opera Porgy and Bess co-starring Carmen McRae. Davis is accompanied by orchestras conducted by Buddy Bregman and Morty Stevens, sometimes supported by the Bill Thompson singers. McRae is featured on three of the ten songs, "Summertime", "My Man's Gone Now" and the only duet, "I Loves You, Porgy", all three backed by an orchestra directed by Jack Pleis. "The record is piled to the sky with strings, harps, choruses, and pillowy orchestration," writes Tim Sendra on AllMusic, but "credit[s] Sammy and Carmen for holding up their end of the deal."

== Track listing ==
1. "Summertime"
2. "A Woman Is a Sometime Thing"
3. "My Man's Gone Now"
4. "I Got Plenty o' Nuttin'"
5. "Bess, You Is My Woman Now"
6. "It Ain't Necessarily So"
7. "I Loves You, Porgy"
8. "There's a Boat Dat's Leavin' Soon for New York"
9. "Oh Bess, Oh Where's My Bess"
10. "Oh Lawd, I'm on My Way"

All music composed by George Gershwin, with lyrics by DuBose Heyward and Ira Gershwin.

== Personnel ==
- Sammy Davis Jr. – vocals (on all tracks but 1 and 3)
- Carmen McRae – vocals (1, 3, 7)
- Jack Pleis – conductor (1, 3, 7)
- Buddy Bregman – arranger^{ref?}, conductor (2, 5, 6, 9)
- Morty Stevens – conductor (4, 8, 10)
- The Bill Thompson Singers – choir (2, 6, 10)
