= The Candy Man =

1972 single by Sammy Davis Jr.

Song by Aubrey Woods

from the album Willy Wonka & the Chocolate Factory
- Released: 1971
- Genre: Musical
- Length: 2:31
- Label: Paramount
- Songwriters: Leslie Bricusse; Anthony Newley

"The Candy Man" (or alternatively, "The Candy Man Can") is a song that originally appeared in the 1971 film Willy Wonka & the Chocolate Factory. It was written by Leslie Bricusse and Anthony Newley specifically for the film. Although the original 1964 book by Roald Dahl (Charlie and the Chocolate Factory) contains lyrics adapted for other songs in the film, the lyrics to "The Candy Man" do not appear in the book. The soundtrack version of the song was sung by Aubrey Woods, who played candy store owner Bill in the film. Newley recorded the song on his 1971 album Pure Imagination.

== Attempt at replacing the Woods vocal ==
Lyricist Anthony Newley has said in interviews that upon hearing Woods's rendition for the first time, he was appalled at the lack of commerciality in the performance – worrying that it would possibly be depriving the duo of not only a hit record, but an Oscar nomination as well.

Newley's distaste for the performance became so intense that he was willing to forgo his own performance fee if he were to be allowed to re-arrange and re-record the song himself as well as pay for the session. When denied by producer David L. Wolper due to contractual stipulations by film composer Walter Scharf, Newley tried another tactic: lobbying to be allowed to at least re-dub his own vocal, possibly becoming the ghost voice for Woods; however, Woods's contract forbade that as well. Anthony Newley recorded his own version for MGM Records in 1971 before Sammy Davis Jr.'s hit.

== Sammy Davis Jr. version ==
"The Candy Man"

Single by Sammy Davis Jr.

from the album Sammy Davis Jr. Now
- B-side: "I Want to Be Happy"
- Released: April 1972
- Recorded: August 19, 1971
- Studio: Los Angeles, California
- Genre: Easy listening
- Length: 3:10
- Label: MGM
- Songwriters: Leslie Bricusse, Anthony Newley
- Producers: Don Costa, Michael Viner, Mike Curb

Sammy Davis Jr. singles chronology
"I Have One but One Life to Live" (1969)	"The Candy Man" (1972)	"The People Tree" (1972)

Official audio
- "The Candy Man" on YouTube

Sammy Davis Jr.'s version appears on the Sammy Davis Jr. Now album. It became his only number-one hit, spending three weeks at the top of the Billboard Hot 100 chart starting 10 June 1972, and two weeks at the top of the easy-listening chart. Billboard ranked it as the No. 5 song for 1972. The track featured backing vocals by the Mike Curb Congregation, who earlier released an unsuccessful version of the song. It is recognized as one of Davis's signature songs, and "The Candy Man" came to be his moniker later in his career. The song was nominated for a Grammy Award for Best Pop Vocal Performance, Male at the 15th Annual Grammy Awards.

Despite the record's commercial success, Davis himself disliked it, telling his manager "It's horrible. It's a timmy-two-shoes, it's white bread, cute-ums, there's no romance. Blechhh!" After hastily recording it in two takes at a studio session, he also reportedly said "This record is going straight into the toilet. Not just around the rim but into the bowl, and it may just pull my whole career down with it."

In 2014, Sammy Davis Jr.'s lead vocals from the original 1972 recording were sampled to create a "virtual duet" with singer Barry Manilow, which appeared on Manilow's album My Dream Duets.

=== Charts ===
==== Weekly charts ====
Chart (1972)	Peak position
Australia Kent Music Report	3
Canada RPM Top Singles	2
Canada RPM Adult Contemporary	3
US Billboard Hot 100	1
US Billboard Easy Listening	1
US Cash Box Top 100	1

==== Year-end charts ====
Chart (1972)	Rank
Australia	24
Canada	15
US Billboard Hot 100	5
US Cash Box Top 100	23

=== Certifications ===
Region	Certification	Certified units/sales
United States (RIAA)	Gold	1,000,000^{^}
^{^} Shipments figures based on certification alone.

== Zedd version ==
"Candyman"

Single by Zedd featuring Aloe Blacc

from the album Stay +
- Released: February 26, 2016
- Genre: Future bass
- Length: 2:58
- Label: Interscope
- Songwriters: Leslie Bricusse, Anthony Newley
- Producers: Zedd, Grey, Joseph Trapanese

Zedd singles chronology
"Papercut" (2015)	"Candyman" (2016)	"True Colors" (2016)

Aloe Blacc singles chronology
"Verge" (2015)	"Candyman" (2016)	"Carry You Home" (2016)

"Candyman" was covered by German-Russian producer Zedd featuring American singer Aloe Blacc and released as a single on February 26, 2016, to celebrate the 75th anniversary of M&M's.

=== Production ===
The song was recorded by Zedd with help from Grey and Joseph Trapanese.

=== Critical reception ===
The track received generally positive reviews. Hugh McIntyre wrote that the song is catchy and fun. Aloe Blacc's vocals were praised by Ryan Middleton, who thought that they fit well with Zedd's music. The song was criticized by Diplo, saying that the song was a "rip-off" of Flume.

=== Charts ===
Chart (2016)	Peak position
New Zealand Heatseekers (RMNZ)	9
US Bubbling Under Hot 100 (Billboard)	18
US Hot Dance/Electronic Songs (Billboard)	12

=== Year-end charts ===
Chart (2016)	Position
US Hot Dance/Electronic Songs (Billboard)	35

=== Certifications ===
Region	Certification	Certified units/sales
New Zealand (RMNZ)	Gold	15,000^{‡}
United States (RIAA)	Gold	500,000^{‡}
^{‡} Sales+streaming figures based on certification alone.

== Other uses ==
"The Candy Man" has been featured in a number of radio, films and TV shows after its introduction in Willy Wonka & the Chocolate Factory.

- Danny Baker used the song extensively as a theme during his breakfast show for BBC London 94.9. He would reward listeners who phoned into the show and greeted him as Candy Man. During his time on the show, he amassed a large number of existing versions of the song, commissioned guests such as Ray Gelato to produce new versions, and Baker performed it himself with the BBC Concert Orchestra in 2008. He continued to use the song as a theme tune for his afternoon show on BBC London 94.9 until its cancellation.
- Chris Evans initially played the song on his drive time BBC Radio 2 show every Friday afternoon. When he replaced Terry Wogan on the breakfast show in January 2010, he continued to play the song every Friday morning.
- The Broadway and U.S. tour production of Charlie and the Chocolate Factory features Willy Wonka singing this song at the top of the show, just as he disguises himself as a candy store owner.
- Sammy Davis Jr.'s recording is heard in the intro for the 2021 film Candyman.

== In popular culture ==
- In the 1980s, the tune was adapted as a commercial jingle ("The Sunshine Baker Man", sung by Davis) for Sunshine Biscuits.
- The Simpsons parodied the song as "The Garbage Man Can" in the 1998 episode "Trash of the Titans", performed by Dan Castellaneta as Homer Simpson with U2.
- Comedian Tim Hawkins released a parody of the song, "The Government Can", in 2009. The video for the song went viral and has garnered over 7.6 million views on YouTube.
- M&M Mars used the song from time to time as a jingle for "The M&M's Man". EDM artist Zedd later released his single "Candyman", which samples the original song, to commemorate the 75th anniversary of M&M's candy.
