= Poor Devil (1973 film) =

- Genre: Comedy; Fantasy
- Screenplay by: Richard Baer; Earl Barret
- Story by: Richard Baer; Earl Barret; Arne Sultan
- Directed by: Robert Scheerer
- Starring: Sammy Davis Jr. Christopher Lee; Jack Klugman; Adam West
- Music by: Morton Stevens
- Country of origin: United States
- Original language: English

Production
- Executive producers: Earl Barret; Arne Sultan
- Producer: Robert Stambler
- Production location: San Francisco
- Cinematography: Howard Schwartz
- Editors: Robert James Kern; Michael Vejar
- Running time: 73 minutes
- Production company: Paramount Television

Original release
- Network: NBC
- Release: February 14, 1973

Poor Devil (1973) is an NBC television film that served as an unsold pilot of a comedy series. The film was first broadcast on NBC on February 14, 1973.

Sammy Davis Jr. starred as "Sammy", a demon from Hell who desires a promotion from working in the furnace room. Lucifer, played by horror veteran Christopher Lee, tells Sammy that he must first convince a San Francisco accountant named Burnett J. Emerson (Jack Klugman) to sell his soul. The film also starred Adam West, Madlyn Rhue and Byron Webster.

== Synopsis ==
Sammy, a demon in desperate need of a promotion, uses the scanners in Hell—the place looks like Mission Control in Houston—to watch as Burnett (Klugman) makes an inept attempt to rob the safe in the department store where he works. Sammy decides Burnett is prime pickings to be recruited for Hell. The Devil gives Sammy a chance, but warns that if he fails he'll be shoveling coal in the furnace room for 1,000 years. He appears to Burnett later that night, literally zapping into his bed next to him, and makes his pitch: seven years of anything he wants in exchange for his soul. At first, Burnett doesn't believe him, but eventually does, and signs the contract. His first wish is for Sammy to steal everything in the department store where he works in one night. This presents a problem for Sammy as his powers are quite limited. He calls a meeting of damned souls in a conference room in Hell and gets ideas from the likes of Al Capone and Blackbeard. That night he drugs the security guard and then his fellow demons clean out the store. As he and Burnett are walking through the store they stop at a jewelry counter and Sammy puts a nice new watch on Burnett's wrist. He also sees someone he knows helping with the robbery—his father-in-law! He says to Burnett, "I won't tell if you won't."

Later, as the store is almost cleaned out Burnett has second thoughts. He wanted to punish the company, but realizes that taking all the merchandise will harm the workers, his friends, and so tells Sammy to put everything back! It's not easy, but they manage, and the next day Burnett wishes for a mink for his wife and happily speaks of how he and his wife will spend the next seven years going places and doing things, and then spend eternity together. Sammy breaks the bad news to Burnett: his wife is scheduled to go "up there." Sad and despondent, Burnett doesn't know what to do, and then Sammy asks him for the time. He tells him and Sammy points out that Burnett is still wearing the watch he gave him, which technically means he didn't put everything back from the robbery. As he didn't fulfill Burnett's wish his contract is null and void, and he's free. The Devil then appears, only Sammy can see and hear him, and scolds his lowly demon for letting a soul get away. As Burnett tries to explain to the Dark Lord, he zaps Sammy and himself back to Hell. Later, Sammy is sharing a nice meal with his girlfriend, but then has to get back to work shoveling. In defiance he throws the shovel into the furnace, and Bligh, the Devil's assistant zaps another into Sammy's hands warning him that his 700 year sentence can easily become 800. Sammy gets back to work.
