= Cover Me Babe =

1970 American film

- Theatrical release poster
- Directed by: Noel Black
- Written by: George Wells
- Produced by: Lester Linsk
- Starring: Robert Forster; Sondra Locke; Susanne Benton; Ken Kercheval; Sam Waterston; Michael Margotta; Floyd Mutrux; Maggie Thrett; Jeff Corey
- Cinematography: Michel Hugo
- Edited by: Harry W. Gerstad
- Music by: Fred Karlin; Georges Reich
- Distributed by: 20th Century Fox
- Release date: October 1, 1970
- Running time: 89 minutes
- Country: United States
- Language: English

Cover Me Babe is a 1970 drama film about a young filmmaker who is hypercritical about everything including his own work. The film was directed by Noel Black, and stars Robert Forster and Sondra Locke. The title song was written by Fred Karlin and Randy Newman, and performed by Bread. A second song by Bread (written by Karlin and band members James Griffin and Robb Royer, titled "So You Say") also appeared on the soundtrack.

== Plot ==
Tony Hall is a film-school student who does not care to make conventional films. His first avant-garde effort features Melisse, who becomes Tony's lover and moves in with him.

Seeking a grant, Tony is steered to Paul, who's a Hollywood agent, but he continues to reject the notion of making movies that conform to the norm. Tony shoots realistic footage of a couple making love in a car, a derelict, a prostitute, even an argument between Melisse and a young student that nearly turns violent. He alienates all eventually, and becomes alone in the end.

== Cast ==
- Robert Forster as Tony
- Sondra Locke as Melisse
- Ken Kercheval as Jerry
- Sam Waterston as Cameraman
- Jeff Corey as Paul
- Susanne Benton as Sybil
- Robert Fields as Will

== Production ==
It was based on an original script by George Wells.

Michael Sarrazin originally was sought for the lead role. Filming took place in spring 1969 under the working title Run Shadow Run.

== Reception ==
Vincent Canby of The New York Times wrote that the film displayed "a compulsive need to ridicule itself, to deny its basic intelligence and to fail. It accomplishes all of these things with an idiocy that should warm the neurotic heart." He explained that it was "loaded with its own clichés of dialogue, attitude and style." He also pointed out the irony of the protagonist railing against the studio system in a movie financed by 20th Century Fox.

In the November 6, 1970 issue of Life, Richard Schickel called Forster's Tony Hall "a sullen creep" but added that "the writing is so bad and Mr. Black's direction so unpersuasive that he (Hall) deserves more to be pitied than censured, as does everyone else caught up in this foolishness."

== Box office ==
According to Fox records, the film required $3,525,000 in rentals to break even, and by 11 December 1970, it had made $1,050,000, resulting in a loss to the studio.

== See also ==
- List of American films of 1970
