= I Want to Be Happy =

1925 song written for the musical No, No, Nanette

- Sheet music, 1924

Song
- Published: 1924
- Genre: Popular
- Composer: Vincent Youmans
- Lyricists: Irving Caesar, Otto Harbach

"I Want to Be Happy" is a song with music by Vincent Youmans and lyrics by Irving Caesar and Otto Harbach, written for the 1925 musical No, No, Nanette.

== Musical ==
The song is used several times throughout the musical as a running theme representing the attempts of various people to please others.

It is first sung by the character Jimmy to his ward Nanette.

== Film appearances ==
- 1930 No, No, Nanette
- 1940 No, No, Nanette - sung by Anna Neagle and Richard Carlson
- 1950 Tea for Two - sung by Doris Day, and also sung by Doris Day and Gordon MacRae
- 1988 Torch Song Trilogy - performed by Benny Goodman and His Orchestra
- 1995 Stuart Saves His Family - performed by Tommy Dorsey & His Orchestra starring Warren Covington
- 1999 Entrapment - performed by Ted Heath and His Orchestra
- 2015 Joy - performed by Ella Fitzgerald and Chick Webb and His Orchestra

== Recordings ==
“I Want to Be Happy” charted several times over 13 years:

- Carl Fenton and his Orchestra (1924, Billy Jones, Ernest Hare, Wilfred Glenn, Elliot Shaw, vocal, peaking at #5 over three weeks)
- Vincent Lopez and His Orchestra (1925, seven weeks, two of them at #2)
- Jan Garber and His Orchestra (1925, 5 weeks, peaking at #5)
- Shannon Four composed of Charles Hart, Lewis James, Elliot Shaw, Wilfred Glenn (1925, one week, peaking at #13). In 1926 this group became the Revelers.
- Red Nichols (cornet) and Adrian Rollini (baritone sax) (1930, one week, peaking at #19)
- Benny Goodman and His Orchestra (1937, one week, peaking at #17).

Other recordings include:

- Ella Fitzgerald - recorded December 17, 1937 with Chick Webb and his Orchestra for Decca Records, catalog No. 15039A.
- Glenn Miller and His Orchestra recorded the song in 1939 and released it as the B-side to their hit single "In the Mood".
- Lester Young, Nat King Cole and Buddy Rich recorded the song in 1946, which was released in 1953 on the Clef Records 10-inch LP The Lester Young Trio No.2
- Doris Day on the album Tea for Two (1950)
- Bing Crosby recorded the song in 1954 for use on his radio show and it was subsequently included in the box set The Bing Crosby CBS Radio Recordings (1954-56) issued by Mosaic Records (catalog MD7-245) in 2009.
- Lena Horne on her album, Lena...Lovely and Alive (1962)
- Tony Bennett - included in his album Love Story (1971).
- Sammy Davis, Jr. included a version of the song on his 1972 album Sammy Davis Jr. Now.
- The Alan Baylock Jazz Orchestra released a recording of the song on their 2014 studio album Prime Time with Doc Severinsen.
- Thelonious Monk with Sonny Rollins, originally on the LP Sonny Rollins and Thelonious Monk.

== Other Versions ==
- Florence Henderson and Robert Reed performed the song during a medley on a 1977 episode of The Brady Bunch Variety Hour.
- The Amazing Bud Powell, Vol. 2
- A version of the song was sometimes used as the closing theme for The Goon Show

== See also ==
- List of 1920s jazz standards
