= Mr. Wonderful (musical) =

Musical stageplay

- Music: Jerry Bock; Larry Holofcener; George David Weiss
- Lyrics: Jerry Bock; Larry Holofcener; George David Weiss
- Book: Joseph Stein; Will Glickman
- Productions: 1956 Broadway

Mr. Wonderful is a musical with a book by Joseph Stein and Will Glickman, and music and lyrics by Jerry Bock, Larry Holofcener, and George David Weiss.

Written specifically to showcase the talents of Sammy Davis Jr., the thin plot, focusing on entertainer Charlie Welch's show business struggles, primarily served as a springboard for an extended version of Davis's Las Vegas nightclub act.

The Broadway production, staged by Jack Donohue, opened on March 22, 1956, at The Broadway Theatre, following a tryout in Philadelphia on February 20, 1956. In addition to Davis, the cast included his father Sammy Sr. and uncle Will (who together with Davis had performed as the Will Mastin Trio), Olga James, Jack Carter, Chita Rivera, Malcolm Lee Beggs, Marilyn Cooper and Patricia Marshall.

The Broadway production was panned by critics but surprised everyone, including the producers, to go on to be a commercial success, recouping its $225,000 investment. Davis had initially signed a contract for one year but, with the poor critical reception, made other commitments for the following year and, as he was considered irreplaceable, the play closed on February 23, 1957, after 383 performances.

== Song list ==
Act I

- "1617 Broadway" – Rita Romano, Hal and Ensemble
- "Without You, I'm Nothing" – Fred Campbell and Lil Campbell
- "Jaques D'Iraq" – Charlie Welch, Uncle, Dad and Ensemble
- "Ethel, Baby" – Ethel Pearson and Charlie Welch
- "Mr. Wonderful" – Ethel Pearson
- "Charlie Welch" – Fred Campbell
- "Big Time (Added after opening)" – Charlie Welch
- "Charlie Welch" (Reprise) – Fred Campbell and Ensemble
- "Talk to Him" – Lil Campbell and Ethel Pearson
- "Too Close for Comfort" – Charlie Welch
- "Without You, I'm Nothing" (Reprise) – Fred Campbell and Charlie Welch
- "Sing, You Sinners" (From Honey film)
  - Lyrics by Sam Coslow and Music by W. Franke Harling
- "Daddy, Uncle, and Me"
  - Music and Lyrics by Sid Kuller and Lyn Murray
- "Because of You"
  - Lyrics by Arthur Hammerstein and Music by Dudley Wilkinson
- "That Old Black Magic" (From Star Spangled Rhythm film)
  - Lyrics by Johnny Mercer and Music by Harold Arlen
- "The Birth of the Blues" (From George White's Scandals of 1926)
  - Lyrics by Buddy DeSylva and Lew Brown with Music by Ray Henderson
- "It's All Right with Me" (From Can-Can)
  - Music and Lyrics by Cole Porter

Act II

- "I'm Available" – Rita's Audition
- "There" – Charlie Welch
- "Miami" – Lil Campbell and Ensemble
- "I've Been Too Busy" – Ethel Pearson, Fred Campbell, Lil Campbell and Charlie Welch
- "Mr. Wonderful" (Reprise) – Ethel Pearson
- "Sing, You Sinners"
- "Daddy, Uncle and Me"
- "Because of You"
- "That Old Black Magic"
- "Birth of the Blues"
- "It's All Right With Me"
- "Dearest (You're the Nearest to My Heart)"
  - Lyrics by Benny Davis and Music by Harry Akst)
- "Liza (All the Clouds'll Roll Away)" (From Show Girl)
  - Lyrics by Ira Gershwin and Gus Kahn with Music by George Gershwin

Finale: "Mr. Wonderful" – Entire Company
