= Johnny Helms =

- Born: John Newton Helms; February 10, 1935; Columbia, South Carolina, U.S.
- Died: March 27, 2015 (aged 80) Columbia, South Carolina, U.S.
- Genres: Jazz, swing, bebop, hard bop
- Occupations: Musician, band leader, jazz festival organizer
- Instrument: Trumpet
- Years active: 1950s – 2000s

John Newton "Johnny" Helms (February 10, 1935 – March 27, 2015) was an American jazz trumpet player, bandleader, and music educator from Columbia, South Carolina. He performed with Chris Potter, Tommy Newsom, Bill Watrous, Red Rodney, Woody Herman, Sam Most, and the Clark Terry Big Band among others. In 1989, he was featured along with Terry and Oscar Peterson as part of Clark Terry and Friends at Town Hall during the JVC Jazz Festival.

== Influences and early career ==
Helms displayed a talent for music at a young age and was invited to perform with the University of South Carolina Band while in the ninth grade at Columbia High School. An early stylistic influence was trumpeter Chet Baker, but as his style matured, Helms became a devotee of the great jazz trumpet player Clifford Brown and easily mastered the hard bop style and phrasing that was part of Brown's legacy.

Helms was an avid supporter of jazz saxophonist Chris Potter who had the opportunity to learn his craft while performing with Helms.

== Higher education ==
Helms earned his Bachelor of Music degree in 1973 from the University of South Carolina and was Band Director for the Pelion Highschool Concert Band and Panther Pep Band.

== Jazz festival organizer ==
Helms was a founding organizer in 1986 (with Veron Melonas), and musical director of the Main Street Jazz Festival in Columbia, South Carolina. Beginning with the summer of 1987, The Jazz Foundation, Inc., a South Carolina non-profit organization founded in 1987, of which Helms was the registered agent, became one of the sponsors of the festival. The foundation's mission was to promote the city of Columbia and to celebrate a uniquely American art form. Other sponsors included the Columbia Action Council (a South Carolina non-profit organization) and The Elite Epicurean Restaurant of Columbia, then owned by Veron S. Melonas (1933–2001). In 1989, the festival featured Tommy Newsom, Red Rodney, Urbie Green, Bill Watrous, Jimmy Heath, Chris Potter, Bill Crow, Andy Simpkins, Harold Jones, Ed Soph, Johnny Frigo, Bucky Pizzarelli, John Pizzarelli, Ross Tompkins, and Derek Smith, among others. Video highlights of the performances were produced by South Carolina Educational Television.

== Spoleto Festival USA ==
Johnny Helms was a featured soloist at the 1977 (summer) Spoleto Festival USA, Charleston, South Carolina with the One O'Clock Lab Band, Phil Woods, Louie Bellson, and Urbie Green. The event marked the first time that the Spoleto festival had been held in the Americas. Since its 1958 founding in Italy by Gian Carlo Menotti, jazz had never been performed at a Spoleto event. Since its US spinoff debut in 1977 — Spoleto USA — jazz has held an integral role in what has become the largest performing arts festival in the Americas, dwarfing its Old World parent. A recording of the performance was broadcast March 25, 1978, and September 28, 1978, on National Public Radio program, Jazz Alive. The NPR Broadcasts were part of a jazz series produced by Nation Public Broadcasting called Jazz Alive.

== Selected discography ==
- Perdido: The Columbia Museum of Art

Recorded in Columbia, South Carolina, April 28, 1974 (private recording)
Helms, trumpet, Clark Terry, trumpet, Bucky Pizzarelli, guitar

- Jazz at Spoleto '77, Left Bank Jazz Society of Charleston LBJSoC LS2692 (1978); OCLC 31056413, 899998617, LCCN 94-759379

Live, Spoleto Festival USA, Charleston, South Carolina, May 18, 1977
University of North Texas One O'Clock Lab Band, Leon Breeden, director
Featuring Urbie Green (trombone, track 2), Phil Woods (soprano sax, track 3), Louie Bellson (drums, track 4), Helms (trumpet, track 8 "Joy Spring," by Clifford Brown)

- The Columbia Jazz Trio Plus Two

1987 SCETV production
Helms, trumpet, Terry Rosen, guitar, Chris Potter, alto sax, Frank Duvall, bass, Ted Linder Drums

- The Columbia Jazz Quintet Live at Pug's

1988 by Dig This Productions
Helms, trumpet, Terry Rosen, guitar, Chris Potter, alto sax, Frank Duvall, bass, Ted Linder, drums
Initially recorded for broadcast on SCETV Radio; released on cassette and later CD by the group's leader, Terry Rosen
