= Best Friends (1975 film) =

1975 film

- Directed by: Noel Nosseck
- Written by: Arnold Somkin; Doug Chapin
- Produced by: Paul Cowan; Noel Nosseck
- Starring: Richard Hatch; Susanne Benton; Doug Chapin
- Cinematography: Stephen M. Katz
- Edited by: Robert Gordon
- Music by: Rick Cunha
- Production company: Marimark Productions
- Distributed by: Crown International Pictures
- Release date: 25 May 1975
- Running time: 83 minutes
- Country: United States
- Language: English

Best Friends is a 1975 American drama film directed by Noel Nosseck and starring Richard Hatch and Doug Chapin. The latter also wrote some of the film's dialogues. The film centers on the slow psychotic deterioration of army serviceman who aims to restore his carefree youth by sabotaging his best friend's marital engagement.

== Plot ==
Jesse and his fiancée Kathy travel to El Paso to meet Jesse's friend Pat, who has been discharged from the United States Army, and Pat's girlfriend Jo Ella. The group travel to California in a luxury motorhome that Jesse had agreed to deliver to a vehicle show in San Francisco.

Jesse is looking forward to marriage with Kathy, but Pat, who is scarred by his army service and struggling to adjust in society, wants to reclaim the carefree freedom of their youth. He tries to convince Jesse to abandon Kathy and Jo Ella and buy motorcycles to live as drifters, given he has no intention of marrying Jo Ella. Jesse rejects the idea, making it clear that he intends to settle down with Kathy.

As his resentment grows, Pat begins manipulating those around him, such as convincing Kathy that Jesse would make a poor husband, while convincing Jo Ella that Jesse has romantic feelings for her. He eventually succeeds in driving a wedge between the couples and their friendships. Pat attempts to sexually assault Kathy, leading to a brutal fight between he and Jesse. Despite a brief attempt to reconcile, Pat's emotional state continues to decline as he refuses to accept adulthood.

== Cast ==
- Richard Hatch as Jesse
- Susanne Benton as Kathy
- Doug Chapin as Pat
- Ann Noland as Jo Ella
- Renee Paul as Dancer
- Ralph Montgomery as Bar Boss
- Roger Bear as Kola
- John McKee as RV Salesman
- Bonnie Erkel as Doreen
- Julienne Wells as Brenda (as Julie Clinch)
- Michael Gordon as Truck Driver
- Ray Wilinski as Band
- Richard Trees as Band
- Wade Wilson as Band

== Production ==
The film was Noel Nosseck's directional debut for a feature film, having already had extensive experience directing television shows and documentaries. It was also the first feature film for numerous members of the cast, including Richard Hatch, who played Jesse. The film featured a youthful cast and crew, the eldest being 33 years old.

It is unclear as to the nature of army service the two male leads had undertaken, however Nosseck and Somkin did not consider the two to have seen combative action, but rather simply as two young men who had enlisted and served time in the army.

One of the filming locations in late 1973 included a sports center in Flagstaff, Arizona, where the manager played a supporting role as himself, selling a motorbike to one of the male leads. Nossecks explained the reason for choosing the area as a filming location, as it was possible to find places nearby which could appear like somewhere else. Most of the film was shot around Los Angeles.

== Critical reception ==
Writing for the Los Angeles Times, Kevin Thomas described the film as a "beautifully polished gem of psychological suspense that is outstanding in every aspect". He highlighted the "talented young cast" and gave special praise to Nosseck in his feature film directional debut.
