= Will Mastin Trio =

American vaudeville singing and dancing trio

The Will Mastin Trio. Left to right: Sammy Davis Sr., Sammy Davis Jr., Will Mastin

The Will Mastin Trio (also Will Maston Trio on some bills) was a troupe of dancers and singers formed by Will Mastin, Sammy Davis Sr., and Sammy Davis Jr. The original members were Sammy Davis Sr., Howard M. Colbert Jr., and Will Mastin, although Sammy Davis Jr. would join them on stage when he was a little boy. Howard M. Colbert Jr. was the tap-dance teacher of Sammy Davis Jr., who treated him much as an uncle. Colbert left the Trio in December 1941 to join the United States Army when the United States declared war on Germany during World War II. Sammy Davis Jr. was 16 years old at this time and became part of the main vaudeville act, replacing Colbert.

They performed from the 1920s through the 1960s.

The trio stopped performing when Sammy Davis Jr. was called to serve in the Army in 1943, but resumed their activity after the end of the war in Portland, Oregon. Even when Sammy Davis Jr.'s solo career was successful, during the 1950s and 1960s, he still performed occasionally with his father and uncle as the Will Mastin Trio, typically giving them billing on his shows and singles.

In 1953, Sammy Davis Jr. was offered his own television show on ABC. He was still under contract with Will Mastin, so the show was intended to be called Three for the Road — with the Will Mastin Trio. The network spent $20,000 filming the pilot which presented African Americans as struggling musicians, not the usual slapstick comedy or stereotypical mammy roles of the time. The cast included Frances Davis who was the first black ballerina to perform for the Paris Opera, actresses Ruth Attaway and Jane White, and Frederick O'Neal who founded the American Negro Theater. The network couldn't get a sponsor, so the show was dropped.

Among their credited appearances are the movie Sweet and Low of 1947 and the musical Mr. Wonderful, staged on Broadway from 1956 to 1957.
