= Susanne Benton =

Canadian actress (born 1948)

Susanne Benton (née Hildur; born February 3, 1948) is a retired Canadian actress known for her film roles as General Dreedle's WAC in Catch-22 (1970) and Quilla June Holmes in A Boy and His Dog (1975). In 1972, she appeared in the Andy Griffith film The Strangers in 7A, credited under her birth name, Susanne Hildur. She also used that name when appearing in an episode of Barnaby Jones a year later in 1973.

== Biography ==
Susanne Hildur was born in Toronto, Ontario, Canada. Her father, who raised her, was a jazz pianist. Benton's mother left the family after she separated from her husband when Benton was two. She became convinced at the age of six that she would become a major star. However, she also reportedly believed that she would die before she reached her 28th birthday. In adulthood, she was eventually reunited with her mother and lived for a year with her in Canada.

During her early roles she refused to disrobe for her parts, despite the requests of her Universal Studios bosses. However, she posed nude for a multi-page pictorial in the May 1970 Playboy magazine. She often expressed the need to walk and felt unwell when she couldn't walk due to working on set.

She married James Benton in 1966, which ended in divorce. She later married David Rudich.

== Selected filmography ==
- The Virginian, "A Bad Place to Die" (1967), as Lila Standish
- Jigsaw (1968)
- That Cold Day in the Park (1969) as Nina
- Catch-22 (1970) General Dreedle's WAC.
- Cover Me Babe (1970) as Sybil
- The Strangers in 7A (1972)
- Love, American Style, "Love and the Stutter" (1973)
- Guess Who's Sleeping in My Bed? (1973) as Mrs. Jones
- The F.B.I., "Fool's Gold" (1973)
- Gunsmoke, "The Sharecroppers" (1974), as AvMarie
- Best Friends (1975) as Kathy
- The Rookies (1975) Season 4, Episode 7 "Death Lady"
- A Boy and His Dog (1975) as Quilla June Holmes
- Survival (1976) as Susanne
- The Last Horror Film (1982)
