= Sammy Swings =

Studio album by Sammy Davis Jr.
- Released: 1957
- Recorded: 1957
- Genre: Vocal jazz
- Length: 34:39
- Label: Decca

Sammy Davis Jr. chronology
Here's Lookin' at You (1956)	Sammy Swings (1957)	It's All Over but the Swingin' (1957)

Sammy Swings is the fourth studio album by Sammy Davis Jr., released in 1957.

== Track listing ==
1. "Temptation" (Nacio Herb Brown, Arthur Freed) – 2:56
2. "The Lady's in Love with You" (Burton Lane, Frank Loesser) – 2:39
3. "Comes Love" (Sam H. Stept) – 2:45
4. "Don't Get Around Much Anymore" (Duke Ellington, Bob Russell) – 3:27
5. "That Old Black Magic" (Harold Arlen, Johnny Mercer) – 2:37
6. "Oo-Shoo-Be-Doo-Be" (Dizzy Gillespie, Joe Carroll, Bill Graham) – 2:44
7. "Begin the Beguine" (Cole Porter) – 3:24
8. "By Myself (Arthur Schwartz, Howard Dietz) – 2:57
9. "The Gypsy in My Soul" (Clay Boland, Moe Jaffe) – 2:57
10. "Will You Still Be Mine" (Tom Adair, Matt Dennis) – 2:57
11. "Don'cha Go 'Way Mad" (Illinois Jacquet, Jimmy Mundy, Al Stillman) – 2:45
12. "Perdido (Lost)" (Juan Tizol, Ervin Drake, Hans Lengsfelder) – 2:31

== Personnel ==
- Sammy Davis Jr. – vocals
