= Sammy Davis Jr. Belts the Best of Broadway =

Studio album by Sammy Davis Jr.
- Released: 1962
- Recorded: 1962
- Genre: Vocal jazz
- Length: 38:13
- Label: Reprise
- Producer: Jimmy Bowen

Sammy Davis Jr. chronology
The Wham of Sam (1961)	Sammy Davis Jr. Belts the Best of Broadway (1962)	The Sammy Davis Jr. All-Star Spectacular (1962)

Sammy Davis Jr. Belts the Best of Broadway is a 1962 studio album by Sammy Davis Jr., arranged by Marty Paich.

== Track listing ==
1. "Too Close for Comfort" (Jerry Bock, George David Weiss, Larry Holofcener) - 3:01
2. "My Romance" (Richard Rodgers, Lorenz Hart) - 3:30
3. "We Kiss In a Shadow" (Rodgers, Oscar Hammerstein II) - 3:18
4. "Two Ladies in De Shade of De Banana Tree" (Harold Arlen, Truman Capote)- 2:57
5. "Lost in the Stars" (Kurt Weill, Maxwell Anderson) - 4:25
6. "Falling in Love with Love" (Rodgers, Hart) - 2:25
7. "Climb Ev'ry Mountain" (Rodgers, Hammerstein) - 3:17
8. "Something's Coming" (Leonard Bernstein, Stephen Sondheim) - 2:43
9. "That-Great-Come-and-Get-it-Day" (Burton Lane, Yip Harburg) - 2:41
10. "If I Loved You" (Rodgers, Hammerstein) - 3:55
11. "A Lot of Livin' to Do" (Charles Strouse, Lee Adams) - 2:43
12. "There is Nothing Like a Dame" (Rodgers, Hammerstein) - 2:36

== Personnel ==
- Sammy Davis Jr. – vocals
- Marty Paich – arranger
