= Mood to Be Wooed =

Studio album by Sammy Davis Jr.
- Released: 1958
- Recorded: 1958
- Genre: Vocal jazz
- Length: 44:17
- Label: Decca

Sammy Davis Jr. chronology
Boy Meets Girl (1957)	Mood to Be Wooed (1958)	All the Way... and Then Some! (1958)

Mood to Be Wooed is a 1958 studio album by Sammy Davis Jr. and featuring Mundell Lowe on electric guitar.

== Reception ==
Professional ratings
Review scores
Source	Rating
AllMusic	3.5/5 stars

Bruce Eder of AllMusic gave this album three and a half stars out of five. He was critical of Davis' low-key performance but stated, "the singing in a reflective, almost introspective manner is good enough to carry the entertainment load."

== Track listing ==
1. "What Is There to Say?" (Vernon Duke, E. Y. "Yip" Harburg) – 3:41
2. "Why Shouldn't I?" (Moss Hart, Cole Porter) – 4:01
3. "Love Me" (Ned Washington, Victor Young) – 3:18
4. "Bewitched" (Richard Rodgers, Lorenz Hart) – 4:27
5. "I Could Have Told You" (Jimmy Van Heusen, Carl Sigman) – 3:55
6. "For All We Know" (J. Fred Coots, Sam M. Lewis) – 3:53
7. "Deep in a Dream" (Van Heusen, Eddie DeLange) – 4:05
8. "I Get Along Without You Very Well" (Hoagy Carmichael, Jane Brown Thompson) – 3:28
9. "Mam'selle" (Edmund Goulding, Mack Gordon) – 2:46
10. "Try a Little Tenderness" (Jimmy Campbell, Reg Connelly, Harry M. Woods) – 4:11
11. "This Love of Mine" (Frank Sinatra, Henry Sanicola, Sol Parker) – 3:31
12. "I've Got a Crush on You" (George Gershwin, Ira Gershwin) – 3:01

== Personnel ==
- Sammy Davis Jr. – vocals
- Mundell Lowe – electric guitar
