= Sweet and Low (1947 film) =

1947 film

Sweet and Low is a short musical film from 1947 featuring Richard Webb, Catherine Craig, and Karolyn Grimes and with the Will Maston Trio (Will Mastin [billed as "Will Maston"], Sammy Davis Sr. and Sammy Davis Jr.).

== Synopsis ==
Richard Webb and Catherine Craig are a married couple who throw a masquerade party with live entertainment in their home. The film is about the various individuals and groups who appear there.
