= Boy Meets Girl (Sammy Davis Jr. and Carmen McRae album) =

Studio album by Sammy Davis Jr., Carmen McRae
- Released: 1957
- Recorded: February 18, 19, 1957
- Genre: Vocal jazz
- Length: 37:28
- Label: Decca
- Producer: Ken Druker

Sammy Davis Jr. chronology
It's All Over but the Swingin' (1957)	Boy Meets Girl (1957)	Mood to Be Wooed (1958)

Carmen McRae chronology
Blue Moon (1956)	Boy Meets Girl (1957)	After Glow (1957)

Professional ratings
Review scores
Source	Rating
Allmusic	4.5/5 stars

Boy Meets Girl is a 1957 studio album by Sammy Davis Jr. and Carmen McRae.

== Track listing ==
1. "Happy to Make Your Acquaintance" (Frank Loesser) – 3:14
2. "Tea for Two" (Irving Caesar, Vincent Youmans) – 2:37
3. "They Didn't Believe Me" (Jerome Kern, Herbert Reynolds) – 2:56
4. "You're the Top" (Cole Porter) – 3:05
5. "Cheek to Cheek" (Irving Berlin) – 4:00
6. "Baby, It's Cold Outside" (Loesser) – 3:14
7. "People Will Say We're in Love" (Oscar Hammerstein II, Richard Rodgers) – 3:19
8. "There's a Small Hotel" (Lorenz Hart, Rodgers) – 3:30
9. "A Fine Romance" (Dorothy Fields, Kern) – 2:55
10. "The Things We Did Last Summer" (Sammy Cahn, Jule Styne) – 3:09
11. "Two Sleepy People" (Hoagy Carmichael, Loesser) – 2:53
12. "Who Cares?" (George Gershwin, Ira Gershwin) – 2:36

== Personnel ==
- Sammy Davis Jr. – vocals
- Carmen McRae – vocals
- Jack Pleis – director
