= The Strangers in 7A =

- Home video release misprinted as Strangers in 7A
- Written by: Eric Roth
- Directed by: Paul Wendkos
- Starring: Andy Griffith; Ida Lupino; Michael Brandon; Tim McIntire
- Music by: Morton Stevens
- Country of origin: United States
- Original language: English

Production
- Producer: Mark Carliner
- Cinematography: Robert B. Hauser
- Editor: Bud S. Isaacs
- Running time: 74 minutes
- Production companies: Palomar Pictures

Original release
- Network: CBS
- Release: November 14, 1972

The Strangers in 7A is a 1972 American made-for-television thriller drama film directed by Paul Wendkos and starring Andy Griffith, Ida Lupino, and Michael Brandon. It is based on the 1971 novel of the same title by Fielden Farrington and originally aired on CBS on November 14, 1972.

The film was the first real dramatic role for Griffith following his eight-year run on The Andy Griffith Show, and his two unsuccessful series follow-ups (Headmaster and The New Andy Griffith Show). The film would lead Griffith to star in a series of TV-movies throughout the entire 1970s and most of the 1980s before he re-emerged with another successful series (Matlock).

== Plot ==
Artie Sawyer (Griffith) is a World War II veteran who has been laid off from his factory job. His relationship with his wife, Iris (Lupino), is strained as a result. He takes a job as the superintendent of an apartment building in New York. One night, when Iris is out of town, Artie goes to a bar. He meets a pretty girl named Claudine (Benton) who is looking for an apartment. He brings her to his apartment building intending to let her stay in Apartment 7A, but she seduces Artie. Artie falls for the girl, but her attentions are a ruse. Her sadistic boyfriend Billy (Brandon) and his Army buddies Riff and Virgil plan to use the apartment as a base from which to rob the bank next door. Not knowing about their plans, Artie is suspicious of them when they arrive, but they promise to leave as soon as possible. Artie allows them to stay temporarily, fearing they could expose his tryst with Claudine to Iris.

Artie's conscience gets the better of him, and he sneaks into 7A while the conspirators are away at the bank planting the bomb under a ruse of needing a large safety deposit box for wedding keepsakes while on their honeymoon from Minnesota. Unbelievably they say they've just been married for about three hours.

He discovers the plan to rob the bank. He is caught by Virgil, who holds him there until Billy and Claudine return. Billy orders Virgil and Riff to kidnap Iris, and Iris and Artie are tied up in 7A until after the robbery.

The robbery is foiled when the police surround the bank, and Virgil is killed in an exchange of gunfire. Billy blames Riff when the bomb they rigged to open the vault does not detonate on schedule. To escape the police, Billy forces Riff to plant another bomb in the elevator of the apartment building. Billy orders Iris to tell the police that he will detonate the bomb, killing everyone in the building, if the thieves are not allowed to escape.

Claudine's growing reluctance with the increasing violence and guilt for what she put Artie and Iris through forces her to openly resist Billy's plans. He ridicules her but leaves her behind (her fate is left unknown.) Billy and Riff then take Artie with them as a hostage. In the elevator, Billy berates Riff again for the failure of the first bomb. When Riff rebuts that the second bomb is their salvation, Billy tells him that he is no longer entitled to the money and kills him with a shotgun. Billy decides to still detonate the bomb. In response, Artie jams the elevator. Billy, enraged, threatens Artie with the shotgun. Artie asks him where he placed the bomb, warning him that now he too will die with everyone else in the building when it goes off. They struggle over the gun, and Billy is shot in the shoulder, losing consciousness. Artie grabs Billy's two-way radio and climbs to the top of the elevator where the bomb is. The police are able to guide him in disarming the bomb, and Artie saves the building.

Artie confesses his indiscretion, and he and Iris reconcile their differences and embrace their relationship. With Iris' support, Artie begins taking engineering classes so that he can get a better job.

== Cast ==
- Andy Griffith - Artie Sawyer
- Ida Lupino - Iris Sawyer
- Michael Brandon - Billy
- James A. Watson Jr. - Riff
- Tim McIntire - Virgil
- Susanne Benton - Claudine (as Susanne Hildur)
- Connie Sawyer - Mrs. Layton
- Victoria Carroll - Miss Simpson
- Joseph Mell - Danny
- Squire Fridell - Pete
- Virginia Vincent - Woman in bar
- Marc Hannibal - Police Officer

== Home video ==
Synergy Entertainment released the movie on home video with the incorrect title Strangers in 7A (without The) printed on the box. The title card at the start of the film still reads The Strangers in 7A, though.
