= Starring Sammy Davis Jr. =

Studio album by Sammy Davis Jr.
- Released: January 1955
- Recorded: 1954
- Genre: Vocal
- Length: 37:02
- Label: Decca

Sammy Davis Jr. chronology
Starring Sammy Davis Jr. (1955)	Just for Lovers (1955)

Starring Sammy Davis Jr. is the debut studio album by Sammy Davis Jr., recorded in 1954.

Five of the songs on Starring Sammy Davis Jr. had been previously released as singles ("Hey There," "And This Is My Beloved," "Because of You," "Glad to Be Unhappy," and "Birth of the Blues"), one of which, "Hey There" had reached the Top 20.

Davis was involved in a serious car accident on November 19, 1954, that resulted in the loss of his left eye. He was still wearing an eye patch on the cover of this, his debut LP, released months later.

The album became Davis' first and only number one album on the Billboard 200, making him the first African American solo artist and singer to accomplish this. Previous number-one by other African American recording acts were part of groups, including Nat King Cole's King Cole Trio, The Ink Spots and bandleader Benny Goodman.

== Reception ==
Professional ratings
Review scores
Source	Rating
AllMusic	3.5/5 stars

The AllMusic review by William Ruhlmann awarded the album three and a half stars and said that the final track "The Birth of the Blues", "succeeded in giving the listener a sense of what Davis was like in live performance".

== Track listing ==
1. "The Lonesome Road" (Gene Austin, Nathaniel Shilkret) - 2:10
2. "Hey There" (Richard Adler, Jerry Ross) - 2:48
3. "And This Is My Beloved" (Robert C. Wright, George Forrest) - 2:52
4. "September Song" (Maxwell Anderson, Kurt Weill) - 2:51
5. "Because of You" (Arthur Hammerstein, Dudley Wilkinson) - 5:28
6. "Easy to Love" (Cole Porter) - 2:24
7. "Glad to Be Unhappy" (Lorenz Hart, Richard Rodgers) - 3:05
8. "Stan' Up an' Fight" (Georges Bizet, Hammerstein) - 4:09
9. "My Funny Valentine" (Hart, Rodgers) - 3:07
10. "Spoken For" (Mickey Rooney) - 2:56
11. "The Birth of the Blues" (Lew Brown, Buddy DeSylva, Ray Henderson) - 5:14

== Personnel ==
- Sammy Davis Jr.–- vocals
- Orchestras directed by Morty Stevens and Sy Oliver
