= Sammy Davis Jr. Now =

Studio album by Sammy Davis Jr.
- Released: 1972
- Genre: Jazz; swing; easy listening; soul
- Length: 43:23
- Label: MGM Records
- Producer: Mike Curb; Don Costa; Jimmy Bowen; Perry Botkin Jr.; Michael Viner; Isaac Hayes

Sammy Davis Jr. chronology
Sammy Steps Out (1970)	Sammy Davis Jr. Now (1972)	Portrait of Sammy Davis Jr. (1972)

Sammy Davis Jr. Now is a 1972 album by Sammy Davis Jr. The album features the number one hit "The Candy Man", a Grammy-nominated song. The rest of the album is made up of standards, big ballads and soul tracks.

== Chart performance ==
The album debuted on Billboard magazine's Top LP's & Tape chart in the issue dated April 29, 1972, peaking at No. 11 during a twenty-six-week run on the chart.

== Reception ==
Professional ratings
Review scores
Source	Rating
AllMusic	1.5/5 stars

Eugene Chadbourne of AllMusic rated Sammy Davis Jr. Now one-and-a-half out of five stars. He stated that "there are tracks enough on this album that are painful to sit through", but also said that "The Candy Man" "surely will retain its historical value simply for being about the closest music has ever come to being pure excrement." He concluded his review by stating that "it is big enough for the artist himself to hide behind".

== Track listing ==
1. "The Candy Man" – 3:10 (covered from the film Willy Wonka & the Chocolate Factory) (Leslie Bricusse, Anthony Newley)
2. "This is My Life" – 3:23 (Bruno Canfora)
3. "I am Over 25 - But You Can Trust Me" – 3:24 (Mack David, Mike Curb)
4. "Have a Little Talk with Myself" – 3:26 (Ray Stevens)
5. "Willoughby Grove" – 3:58 (R.W. Scott, Danny Meehan)
6. "Take My Hand" – 4:20 (J. O'Brien, B. James)
7. "I'll Begin Again" – 2:35 (covered from the film Scrooge) (Leslie Bricusse)
8. "I Want to Be Happy" (Vincent Youmans, Irving Caesar) – 2:45
9. "MacArthur Park" (Jimmy Webb) – 7:30
10. "Time to Ride" – 2:28 (Ray Charles, Mack David)
11. "John Shaft" – 3:49 (covered from the film Shaft) (Isaac Hayes)
