= Will Mastin =

American entertainer (1878–1979)

- Born: July 20, 1878; Madison, Alabama, U.S.
- Died: March 14, 1979 (aged 100); Los Angeles, California, U.S.

Will Mastin (June 20, 1878 – March 14, 1979), also credited as Will Maston, was a dancer and singer.

== Career ==
Will Mastin Trio - (L-R) Sammy Davis Sr., Sammy Davis Jr., and Will Mastin

Mastin was the leader of the Will Mastin Trio, which included Sammy Davis Sr. and his son Sammy Davis Jr.

The three appeared in the 1947 musical short film Sweet and Low and the 1956 Broadway musical Mr. Wonderful.

The Will Mastin Trio's original members were Sammy Davis Sr., Howard M. Colbert Jr., and Will Mastin.

== Personal life ==
Mastin was born in Madison, Alabama on June 20, 1878, to a single mother named Sally Mastin, according to the 1880 Federal Census of Enumeration and the California Death Index.

== Death ==
Will Mastin died on March 14, 1979, at age 100, according to the California Death Index.
