= Sammy Davis Sr. =

American dancer

- Born: Samuel George Davis; December 12, 1900; Wilmington, North Carolina, U.S.
- Died: May 21, 1988 (aged 87); Beverly Hills, California, U.S.
- Occupation: Dancer
- Spouses: Elvera Sanchez (m. 1923; div. 1928): Rita Wade Davis
- Children: 3, including Sammy Davis Jr.

Samuel George Davis Sr. (December 12, 1900 – May 21, 1988) was an American dancer and the father of entertainer Sammy Davis Jr.

== Early life ==
Davis was born in Wilmington, North Carolina, to Rosa B. Taylor (1870–1956) and Robert Davis (1868–1948). He and his former wife Elvera Sanchez were both dancers in a vaudeville troupe. The couple split up when their son Sammy Jr. was three. Davis took custody of his son, who then went into show business with his father. He and Will Mastin, the leader of the dance troupe, taught Sammy Jr. how to dance and they performed together as the Will Mastin Trio.

Sammy Jr. once stated, "When I was nine I told my father, 'I can outdance you'. 'Oh yeah? What makes you think that?' he asked. 'Cause you taught me everything I know'. 'Yeah, but I didn't teach you everything I know.'"

== Career ==
Davis began dancing early in life, and as a young man joined Will Mastin to form a dancing troupe. Soon Sammy Jr. joined the act and they became known as the Will Mastin Trio. The three appeared in the 1956 Broadway musical Mr. Wonderful.

Davis also appeared in two movies, Sweet and Low (1947) with the Will Mastin Trio, and The Benny Goodman Story (1956), in which he played the bandleader and arranger Fletcher Henderson.

== Death ==
Davis died May 21, 1988, in Beverly Hills, California, at the age of 87, of natural causes, just two years before the death of his son, Sammy Davis Jr.

He was interred at Forest Lawn Memorial Park in Glendale, California.
