= The Birth of the Blues =

Popular song from 1926

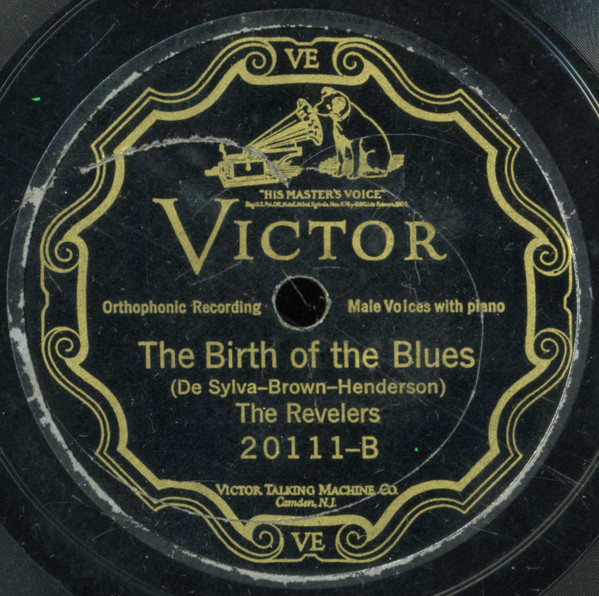

Single by The Revelers
- A-side: "Lucky Day"
- Released: 1926
- Genre: Traditional pop
- Length: 2:45
- Label: Victor
- Songwriters: Ray Henderson; Buddy DeSylva; Lew Brown

"The Birth of the Blues" is a popular 1926 song composed by Ray Henderson, with lyrics by Buddy DeSylva and Lew Brown. It was used in the Broadway revue George White's Scandals of 1926. It was recorded in its debut year by Paul Whiteman (with vocals by Jack Fulton, Charles Gaylord and Austin "Skin" Young), Harry Richman, and The Revelers.

== In popular culture ==
- 1941 Birth of the Blues - sung by Bing Crosby
- 1948 When My Baby Smiles at Me
- 1951 Painting the Clouds with Sunshine
- 1954 Starring Sammy Davis Jr.
- 1956 The Best Things in Life Are Free - danced by Sheree North and Jacques d'Amboise
- 1957 Birth of the Blues - sung by Frank Sinatra
- It is featured in Season 3 of House of Cards, where it is performed by President Frank Underwood, played by Kevin Spacey.
