= Sammy Davis Jr. =

American singer and actor (1925–1990)

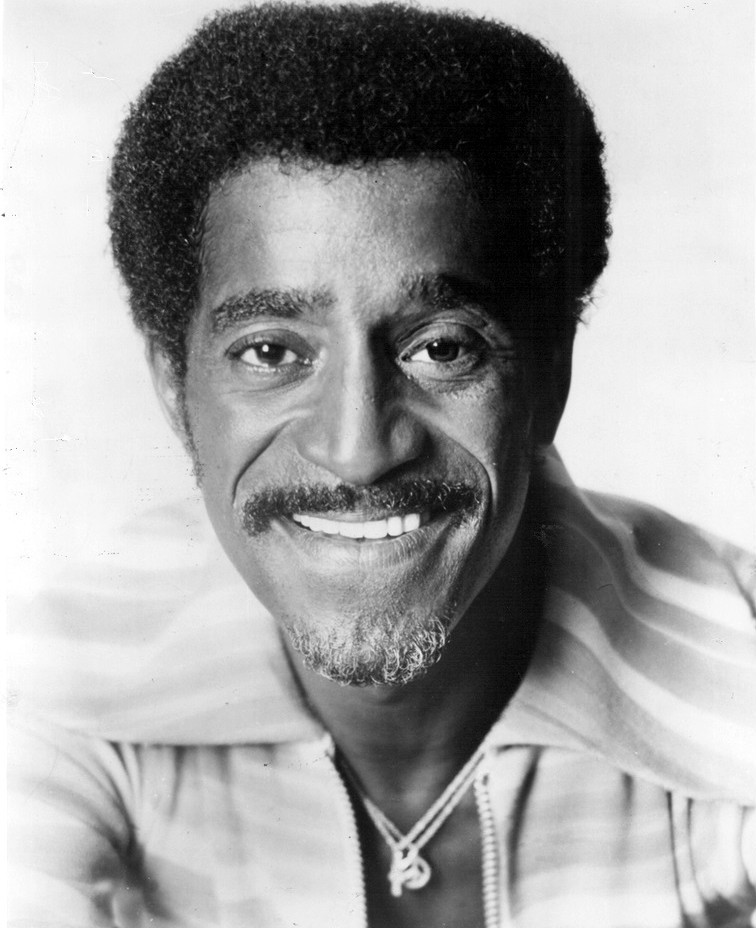
- Davis in 1972
- Born: Samuel George Davis Jr. December 8, 1925; New York City, U.S.
- Died: May 16, 1990 (aged 64); Beverly Hills, California, U.S.
- Resting place: Forest Lawn Memorial Park, Glendale, California
- Occupations: Singer; actor; comedian; dancer
- Years active: 1928–1990
- Spouses: Loray White (m. 1958; div. 1959); May Britt (m. 1960; div. 1968); Altovise Gore (m. 1970)
- Children: 4
- Parents: Sammy Davis Sr.; Elvera Sanchez
- Musical career
- Origin: Los Angeles, California
- Genres: Traditional pop; big band; jazz; easy listening; show tunes; swing; blues; rhythm and blues
- Instruments: Vocals; piano; drums; vibraphone
- Labels: Decca; Reprise; Verve; Motown; MGM; RCA; 20th Century; Applause
- Formerly of: Rat Pack
- Military career
- Allegiance: United States
- Branch: United States Army
- Service years: 1944–1945
- Rank: Private
- Unit: Special Services
- War: World War II
- Website: sammydavisjr.com

Samuel George Davis Jr. (December 8, 1925 – May 16, 1990) was an American singer, actor, comedian and dancer. Known as "Mr. Entertainment" and "Mister Show Business", Davis was regarded as one of the most popular entertainers of the 20th century and as a black entertainer, he helped to break racial barriers in several venues, including nightclubs, music, film and television.

Davis began his career at the age of two in vaudeville with his father Sammy Davis Sr. and Will Mastin in the Will Mastin Trio. At seven, he started his film career with the musical shorts Rufus Jones for President and Seasoned Greetings. In 1951, Davis's career breakthrough came after he and the Will Mastin Trio opened for Janis Paige the week before the 23rd Academy Awards at the Hollywood nightclub Ciro's.

Three years later he became the first black entertainer to headline a show in Las Vegas and two years later starred in his first Broadway musical, Mr. Wonderful. After starring in his first box-office film, Anna Lucasta (1958), Davis earned rave reviews for his role in Porgy and Bess (1959). A year later he became a member of the Rat Pack alongside lifelong friends Frank Sinatra and Dean Martin. In 1964, he returned to Broadway in the musical adaptation of Clifford Odets's Golden Boy, which featured the first interracial kiss in a Broadway play and won Davis a Tony Award nomination. Two years after that, Davis hosted his own variety series.

Davis also became a successful recording artist. His 1955 debut album, Starring Sammy Davis Jr., spawned hits such as "Hey There" and "The Birth of the Blues" and topped the Billboard pop albums chart. His other hits included "Something's Gotta Give", "That Old Black Magic" and the Grammy Award-nominated "What Kind of Fool Am I?". Later hits "I've Gotta Be Me", "The Candy Man" (his only number one hit on the Billboard Hot 100) and "Mr. Bojangles" became his signature songs.

In 1954, at the age of 29, Davis lost his left eye in a car accident. Three years later, Davis faced backlash for his involvement with white actress Kim Novak at a time when interracial relationships were taboo in the U.S. and when interracial marriage was not yet legalized nationwide (until 1967). In 1960, Davis converted to Judaism, finding commonalities between the oppression experienced by both African Americans and Jewish Americans. One day on a golf course with Jack Benny, he was asked what his handicap was. "Handicap?" he asked. "Talk about handicap. I'm a one-eyed Negro who's Jewish." This was to become a signature comment.

After reuniting with Frank Sinatra and Dean Martin in 1987, Davis toured with them and Liza Minnelli internationally before his death from lung cancer in 1990. He died in debt to the Internal Revenue Service, and his estate was the subject of legal battles after the death of his wife. Davis was awarded the Spingarn Medal by the NAACP and was nominated for a Golden Globe Award and an Primetime Emmy Award for his television performances. He was a recipient of the Kennedy Center Honors in 1987, and in 2001, he was posthumously awarded the Grammy Lifetime Achievement Award. In 2017, Davis was inducted into the National Rhythm & Blues Hall of Fame.

== Early life and career ==
Davis was born on December 8, 1925, in the Harlem district of Manhattan in New York City, the son of African-American entertainer and stage performer Sammy Davis Sr. (1900–1988) and Cuban-American tap dancer and stage performer Elvera Sanchez (1905–2000).

During his lifetime, Davis stated that his mother was Puerto Rican and born in San Juan. However, in the 2003 biography In Black and White, author Wil Haygood wrote that Davis's mother was born in New York City to Cuban parents who were of Afro-Cuban background, and that Davis claimed she was Puerto Rican because he feared anti-Cuban backlash would hurt his record sales.

Davis's parents were vaudeville dancers, having met while being members of Will Mastin's Holiday in Dixieland troupe. As an infant, Davis was reared by his paternal grandmother. When he was two years old, his parents separated. His father, not wanting to lose custody of his son, took him on tour as part of what was then known as "Will Mastin's Gang" with Mastin having dropped the "Holiday in Dixieland" title. Davis would learn how to tap dance from troupe member Howard M. Colbert Jr. as well as his father and Mastin, who became his godfather. Davis became a regular performer with the Mastin troupe following a talent show victory at the Standard Theatre in Philadelphia. Some of Davis's early performances had him perform in blackface, due to his father and Mastin disguising Davis as a "44-year-old midget" to avoid child labor laws.

Around 1932 or 1933, the troupe was renamed "Will Mastin's Gang Featuring Little Sammy"; along with tap dancing, Davis also sang with the act, his usual song being Louis Armstrong's rendition of "(I'll Be Glad When You're Dead) You Rascal You". In 1933, Davis caught the attention of filmmakers who were seeking to find child performers for the short film, Rufus Jones for President, easily gaining the role of Rufus Jones. His co-star in the film was Ethel Waters. Later that same year, Davis appeared in another short film, Seasoned Greetings.

By the early 1940s, the troupe had gradually shortened and when Colbert left in 1941, the name of the troupe was changed to the Will Mastin Trio with just Mastin, Sammy Davis Sr. and Jr. They were billed as "The Will Mastin Trio Featuring Little Sammy" and later, "The Will Mastin Trio Featuring Sammy Davis Jr." after Davis became a teenager. In 1941, 15-year-old Davis first became acquainted with Frank Sinatra, then just 25, when Sinatra was the lead singer of Tommy Dorsey's band and the Will Mastin Trio opened for Dorsey during several performances at the Michigan Theater in Detroit. During Davis's early career, Mastin and his father shielded the youngster from racism, for example by dismissing race-based snubs as "jealousy". Davis recalled living for several years in Boston's South End and reminisced years later about "hoofing and singing" at Izzy Ort's Bar & Grille.

=== Military service ===
In December 1944, during World War II, Davis was drafted into the United States Army at age 18. There, Davis was confronted by strong prejudice. Davis later stated: "Overnight the world looked different. It wasn't one color any more. I could see the protection I'd gotten all my life from my father and Will. I appreciated their loving hope that I'd never need to know about prejudice and hate, but they were wrong. It was as if I'd walked through a swinging door for 18 years, a door which they had always secretly held open." He was frequently abused by white soldiers from the South and later recounted: "I must have had a knockdown, drag-out fight every two days." His nose was broken numerous times and permanently flattened. At one point he was offered a beer laced with urine.

He was reassigned to the Army's Special Services branch, which put on performances for troops. At one show he found himself performing in front of soldiers who had previously racially abused him. Davis, who earned the American Campaign Medal and World War II Victory Medal, was discharged in 1945 with the rank of private. He later said, "My talent was the weapon, the power, the way for me to fight. It was the one way I might hope to affect a man's thinking."

While in Paris in September 1944, he found himself being introduced and guided around the city by a French resistance fighter and left-wing journalist, Madeleine Riffaud.

== Career ==
=== Early success ===
Following his discharge from the Army, Davis rejoined the family dance act, which were now performing at clubs in the Pacific Southwest, namely clubs in Portland, Oregon. Davis, who had spent his early years mainly dancing in the troupe, added singing pop standards, playing instruments and doing comedic impressions of actors such as James Cagney, Cary Grant and James Stewart into the act, which helped to increase Davis's popularity and helped the trio earn spots in bigger venues though Davis's father and Mastin warned him that doing impressions of white actors rather than black actors was "controversial", fearing backlash. Due to racial segregation, the trio regularly performed at predominantly black venues in the Chitlin' Circuit. During this era, Davis first got acquainted with Mickey Rooney, who tried to give him a role in a box office film but was rebuffed due to Davis's skin color.

Davis and the Will Mastin Trio first performed at Las Vegas at the El Rancho Vegas on May 15, 1946, becoming one of the first African American acts to perform at the city, though the trio weren't allowed to stay at the hotel like most performers due to the color of their skin. Following their first performance there, the Review-Journal labeled them a "comedy act" and misspelled their name. The trio gradually became a success in Vegas and in 1947, the trio appeared in the short musical film, Sweet and Low, marking Davis's first film appearance since the 1930s. That same year, the trio made their debut at Harlem's Apollo Theater, winning over the venue's predominantly black audience where Davis's dancing skills, singing and comedic impressions were a hit.

That same year, Frank Sinatra, with whom Davis would forge a lifelong friendship, booked the trio to open for him at the Capitol Theater in downtown Manhattan. Around this time, Davis, who had gained a reputation as a singer as much as he had as a dancer and comedian, was given a one-off recording contract with Columbia Records where he recorded a rendition of "The Way You Look Tonight". Davis received his first accolade when jazz music magazine Metronome named him the "Most Outstanding New Personality" of 1946. In 1949, Davis was given a contract with Capitol Records. Fearing he wouldn't find success under his own name, Davis recorded under the pseudonyms Shorty Muggins and Charlie Green and his early recordings consisted of blues music; the recordings flopped. A year later, Davis attempted to get in the Copacabana nightclub to view a performance by Sinatra with Buddy Rich, only to be turned away for being Black. The next night, Sinatra forced the club's owners to allow a solo Davis to walk in on his own.

=== Career breakthrough ===
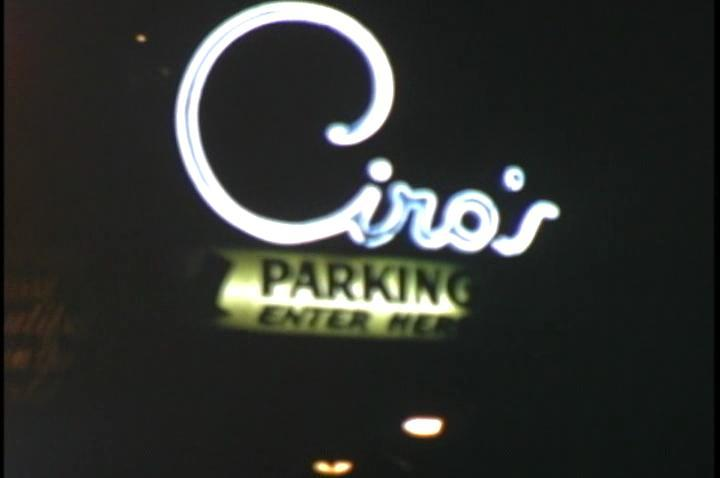
Davis became a breakthrough star after opening for Janis Paige at the Ciro's nightclub in Los Angeles in 1951, it was the site of his comeback from a near fatal car accident four years later.

On March 23, 1951, the Will Mastin Trio appeared at the Los Angeles nightclub Ciro's as the opening act for headliner Janis Paige just prior to the 23rd Academy Awards. The trio were only to perform for twenty minutes, but the reaction from the celebrity-filled crowd was so enthusiastic, especially when Davis launched into his impressions, that they performed for nearly an hour, and Paige insisted the order of the show be flipped.

In August 1951, the trio made their national television debut on the Ed Sullivan Show, though Sullivan mispronounced the trio's name ("Will Marsten Trio") and only referred to Davis as "the kid in the middle". Because of a technical error, which forced viewers to watch a black screen as Davis did his impressions, Sullivan invited Davis for a second appearance, this time by himself. Davis's celebrity grew following the two Sullivan show appearances. By then, the Will Mastin Trio was renamed from The Will Mastin Trio Featuring Sammy Davis Jr. to The Will Mastin Trio Starring Sammy Davis Jr.

A year later, in February 1952, the trio appeared on the Colgate Comedy Hour, then hosted by Eddie Cantor, which proved to be even more successful for Davis. During his appearances on the show, Cantor befriended Davis and gave him a Jewish mezuzah, which the performer wore on his neck, instead of on the door as was the tradition, for "good luck".

By 1953, Davis was starting to be singled out for praise by critics. That year, Davis was offered his own television show on ABC, Three for the Road—with the Will Mastin Trio. The network spent $20,000 filming the pilot, which presented African Americans as struggling musicians, not slapstick comedy or the stereotypical mammy roles of the time. The cast included Frances Davis, who was the first black ballerina to perform for the Paris Opera, actresses Ruth Attaway and Jane White, and Frederick O'Neal, who founded the American Negro Theater. The network could not get a sponsor, so the show was dropped.

In March 1953, the Will Mastin Trio opened at the Copacabana and became the highest paid black act to perform there since Bill "Bojangles" Robinson. The following April, they became the first black act to headline a show at the Las Vegas Strip for $5,000 a week. In November 1954, eight years after first performing in Las Vegas, Davis demanded that the owners of the recently opened New Frontier Hotel and Casino not only book him and the trio for a $7,500 a week headlining gig but also allow the trio to stay in the hotel, which was subsequently granted, breaking a major racial barrier. Prior to this, owing to Jim Crow practices in Las Vegas, Davis had been required (as were all black performers in the 1950s) to lodge in a rooming house on the west side of the city instead of in the hotels where his white colleagues were housed. No dressing rooms were provided for black performers, and they had to wait outside by the swimming pool between acts. Davis and other black artists could entertain but could not stay at the hotels where they performed, gamble in the casinos, or dine or drink in the hotel restaurants and bars. Davis later refused to work at places that practiced racial segregation, at one time he and the trio canceled a gig at a hotel in Miami Beach after they refused to let them stay inside.

=== Ascent to superstardom ===
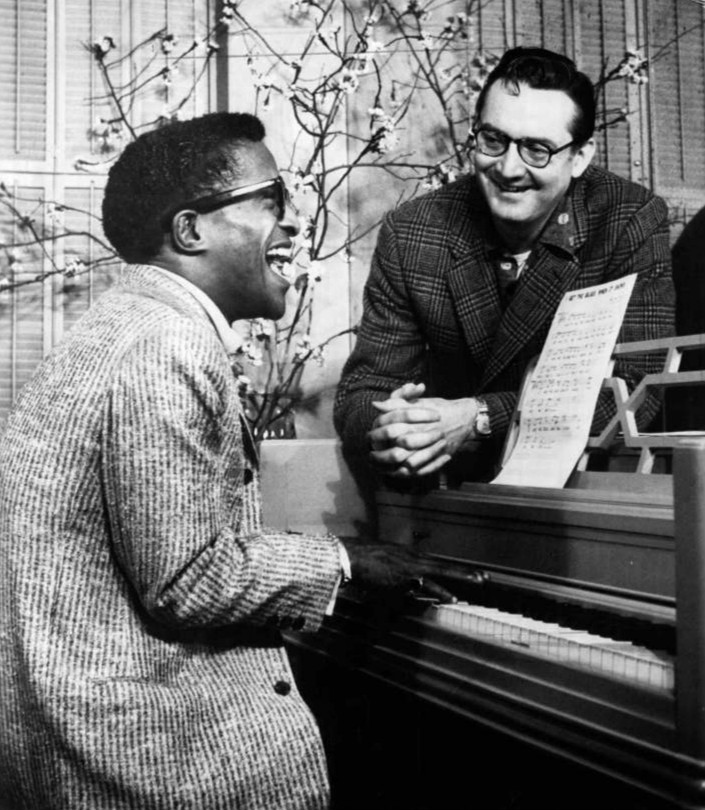
Davis and host Steve Allen rehearsing for the premiere of The Steve Allen Show in 1956

On November 19, 1954, Davis got involved in an automobile accident that caused the loss of his left eye. According to Davis later, he wasn't wearing his mezuzah at the time, having left it accidentally at the door of his hotel suite. After doctors prescribed him a glass eye, Davis retreated in Frank Sinatra's home and began recuperating, having to have rehearsals to determine if he could still perform. An eye patch-sporting Davis made his return to Ciro's on January 11, 1955, where his performance received thunderous applause and ovations. The star-studded performance was integral in turning him into a superstar. Davis later removed the eye patch and performed with his glass eye after he took advice from actor Humphrey Bogart.

Prior to the accident, Davis had signed with Decca Records, this time under his own name, and released his debut album, Starring Sammy Davis Jr., shortly after his Ciro's comeback. The album included his first charted hit, "Hey There", which had hit the top 20 of the Billboard pop charts as well as a song that would be one of Davis's signature tunes, "The Birth of the Blues". It topped the Billboard Pop Albums chart, making him the first solo Black recording artist to accomplish the milestone. Davis later found chart success with the singles "Something's Gotta Give", his first top ten single; "Love Me or Leave Me" and "That Old Black Magic", the latter two making the top twenty. Around the time of the accident, Davis had been hired to sing the title song for the Universal Pictures film Six Bridges to Cross, which later came out in 1955. In 1956, he starred in the Broadway musical Mr. Wonderful, which was panned by critics but was a commercial success, closing after 383 performances.

In 1958, Davis was hired to crown the winner of the Miss Cavalcade of Jazz beauty contest for the famed fourteenth Cavalcade of Jazz concert produced by Leon Hefflin Sr., held at the Shrine Auditorium on August 3. The other headliners were Little Willie John, Sam Cooke, Ernie Freeman, and Bo Rhambo. The event featured the top four prominent disc jockeys of Los Angeles. That same year, Davis made his dramatic acting debut on television in the General Electric Theater before landing his first box-office role in the film, Anna Lucasta, co-starring with actress Eartha Kitt. A year later, Davis won rave reviews for his role as Sportin' Life in the film adaptation of Porgy and Bess, which he co-starred with Sidney Poitier and Dorothy Dandridge. Also in 1959, due to American TV refusing to book a special for him due to his skin color, the entertainer hosted a special in Canada titled Sammy's Parade, on the Canadian network CBC. It was a breakthrough event for the performer, as in the United States in the 1950s corporate sponsors largely controlled the screen: "Black people [were] not portrayed very well on television, if at all", according to Jason King of the Clive Davis Institute of Recorded Music. That same year, Davis ceased performing with his father and Mastin as they both gradually retired from the stage due to old age. Davis would still pay his father and Mastin well into the mid-1960s.

=== The Rat Pack and mainstream success ===
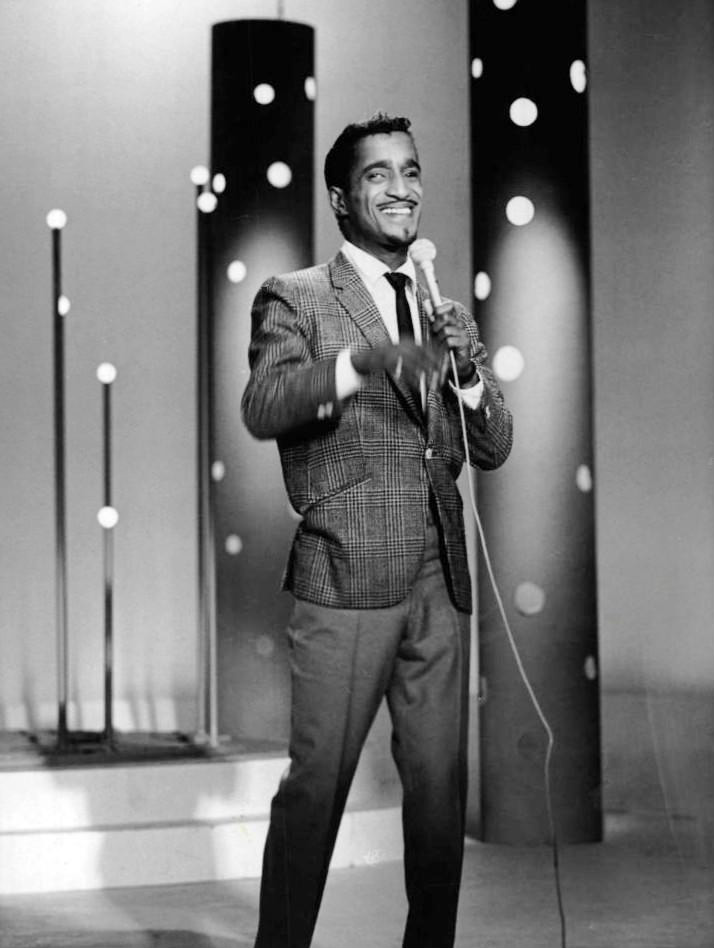
Davis performing in 1966

Davis's stardom grew even more when he became a member of the Rat Pack in 1960. Led by his friend Frank Sinatra, the other members included Dean Martin, Joey Bishop, and Peter Lawford, a brother-in-law of John F. Kennedy. Initially, Sinatra called the gathering "the Clan", but Davis voiced his opposition, saying that it reminded people of the Ku Klux Klan. Sinatra renamed the group "the Summit". They got the nickname, the "Rat Pack", after a long night of poker that went on into the early morning saw Davis, Sinatra and Martin drunken and disheveled; actress Angie Dickinson approached the group and said, "you all look like a pack of rats". The group around Sinatra made several movies together, including Ocean's 11 (1960), Sergeants 3 (1962), and Robin and the 7 Hoods (1964), and they performed onstage together in Las Vegas, mainly at the Sands Hotel and Casino.

In 1961, Davis signed with Sinatra's Reprise Records and found renewed chart success a year later with the album, What Kind of Fool Am I and Other Show-Stoppers, which included the leading single, "What Kind of Fool Am I?", penned by British composers Anthony Newley and Leslie Bricusse. The ballad became Davis's biggest hit in years, peaking at number 17 on the Billboard Hot 100 and becoming one of Davis's show-stoppers during his performances. "What Kind of Fool Am I?" later won Davis his first Grammy Award nominations for Best Male Pop Vocal Performance and Record of the Year at the 5th Grammy Awards in 1963. In 1964, Davis successfully headlined solo at the Copacabana. That year, he returned to Broadway starring in the musical Golden Boy. Despite its then-controversial story involving an interracial romance, producing the first interracial kissing scene on Broadway, the musical became a success and won Davis a Tony Award nomination. In 1966, Davis starred in his first non-Rat Pack film in seven years with A Man Called Adam. Also in 1966, Davis starred in his own variety series, The Sammy Davis Jr. Show, which became the first black series to be nationally televised in over a decade since The Nat King Cole Show. The show was canceled after a season on air.

On December 11, 1967, NBC broadcast a musical-variety special featuring Nancy Sinatra, titled Movin' with Nancy. In addition to the Emmy Award-winning musical performances, the show is notable for Nancy Sinatra and Davis greeting each other with a kiss, one of the first black-white kisses on American television. In 1968, Davis had his most successful single in years when he released the ballad, "I've Gotta Be Me", which peaked at number 11 on the Billboard Hot 100 and topped its adult contemporary chart. A year later, Davis co-starred in the musical, Sweet Charity. After a brief tenure at Motown, where he tried to update his sound to appeal to the youth, he signed with MGM Records in 1971 and had an unexpected number-one hit with "The Candy Man" in 1972. That same year, he recorded his rendition of "Mr. Bojangles", which would become his signature song for the remainder of his career as he closed his shows with the song. Also in 1972, Davis's appearance on All in the Family was memorable for Davis kissing the cheek of Carroll O'Connor's role of Archie Bunker, which led to uproarious laughter from the audience and produced one of the biggest laughs in TV history.

=== Later career ===
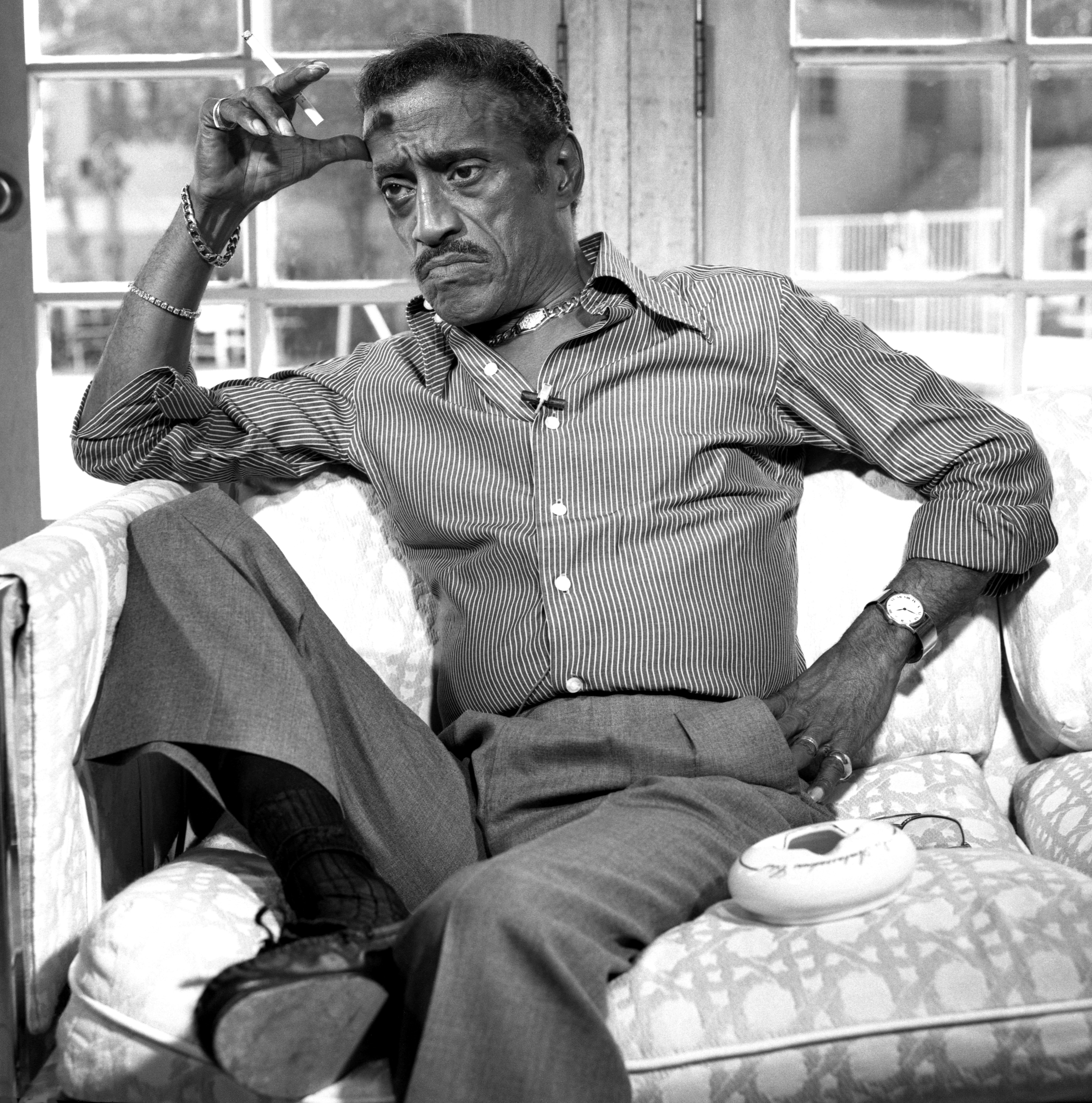
Davis at home in 1986

On May 27–28, 1973, Davis hosted (with Monty Hall) the first annual 20-hour Highway Safety Foundation telethon. Guests included Muhammad Ali, Paul Anka, Jack Barry, Joyce Brothers, Ray Charles, Dick Clark, Roy Clark, Howard Cosell, Ossie Davis, Ruby Dee, Joe Franklin, Cliff Gorman, Richie Havens, Danny Kaye, Jerry Lewis, Hal Linden, Rich Little, Butterfly McQueen, Minnie Pearl, Boots Randolph, Tex Ritter, Phil Rizzuto, The Rockettes, Nipsey Russell, Sally Struthers, Mel Tillis, Ben Vereen, and Lawrence Welk. It was a financial disaster. The total amount of pledges was $1.2 million. Actual pledges received were $525,000. Starting in 1975, Davis starred in his own talk show, Sammy and Company, which lasted three years.

In 1976, Davis performed the popular theme song for the Baretta television series, "Baretta's Theme (Keep Your Eye on the Sparrow)". Two years later, he returned to Broadway for the one-man musical, Stop the World – I Want to Get Off. In 1980, Davis made a cameo appearance on General Hospital and had a recurring role as Chip Warren on One Life to Live, for which he received a 1980 Daytime Emmy Award nomination.

A fan of daytime television, Davis also watched the Australian cult soap opera Prisoner: Cell Block H and in 1986 he famously visited the Network 10 studios in Melbourne. Davis watched several scenes being filmed and met with cast and crew. He described the experience as not knowing who was more starstruck— him for meeting the cast of Prisoner or the cast for meeting Davis.

In 1981, Davis reunited with his fellow Rat Pack member Dean Martin in the film, Cannonball Run, which was a financial success and was followed by Cannonball Run II, which included a cameo appearance by Frank Sinatra, two years later. Davis's final album, the country-influenced Closest of Friends (1982), was a departure from his usual musical style.

By the mid-to-late-1980s, Davis's presence had dwindled from his heyday but he remained a famous personality, appearing in talk shows and game shows. In 1987, he started to make a comeback after he reunited again with Sinatra and Martin in what was to be the comeback of the original Rat Pack titled the Together Again Tour; though when Martin and Sinatra had a falling out in 1988, Liza Minnelli replaced Martin and the tour was redubbed The Ultimate Event. In 1989, Davis returned to film in what would be his last box office role with Gregory Hines in the film, Tap, where he played an aging hoofer who owned a dance studio; Davis's role was praised by critics. That same year, Davis portrayed a hospital patient in an episode of The Cosby Show, which later won him an Emmy Award nomination.

During performances of The Final Event in the late summer of 1989, Davis was diagnosed with throat cancer. Due to the treatments he received, Davis ceased performing permanently.

== Political beliefs and activism ==
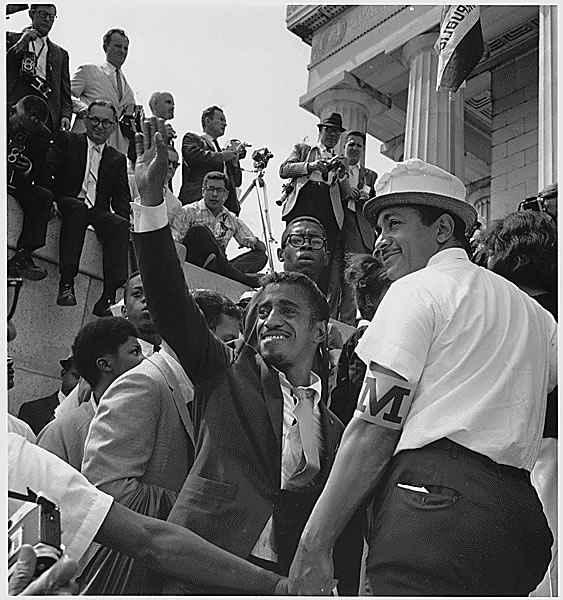
Davis during the 1963 March on Washington

Davis was a registered Democrat and supported John F. Kennedy's 1960 election campaign as well as Robert F. Kennedy's 1968 campaign. Kennedy asked him not to attend his inauguration, since the sight of an interracial couple would offend many Southerners. He went on to become a close friend of President Richard Nixon (a Republican) and publicly endorsed him at the 1972 Republican National Convention. Davis also made a USO tour to South Vietnam at Nixon's request.

In February 1972, during the latter stages of the Vietnam War, Davis went to Vietnam to observe military drug abuse rehabilitation programs and talk to and entertain the troops. He did this as a representative from Richard Nixon's Special Action Office For Drug Abuse Prevention. He performed shows for up to 15,000 troops; after one two-hour performance he reportedly said, "I've never been so tired and felt so good in my life." The U.S. Army made a documentary about Davis's time in Vietnam performing for troops on behalf of Nixon's drug treatment program.

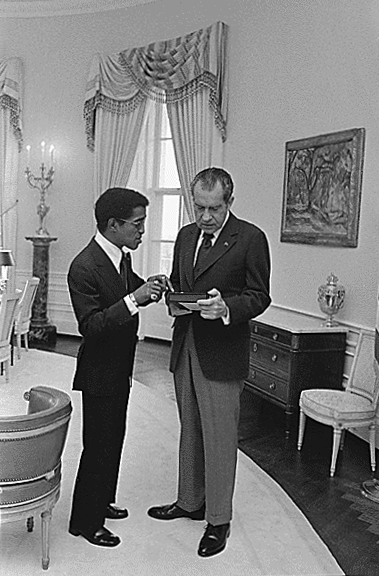
In the Yellow Oval Room of the White House with President Richard Nixon, March 4, 1973

Nixon invited Davis and his wife Altovise to sleep in the White House in 1973, the first time African Americans were invited to do so. The Davises spent the night in the Lincoln Bedroom.

Davis later said he regretted supporting Nixon, accusing him of making promises on civil rights that he did not keep.

Davis attended the 1972 Black Exposition in Chicago organized by Jesse Jackson's Operation PUSH where he referenced his newfound unpopularity due to his endorsement stating, "disagree, if you will, with my politics, but I will not allow anyone to take away the fact that I am black," and performed his classic "I've Gotta Be Me". Davis later supported Jesse Jackson's 1984 campaign for president.

== Personal life ==
=== Accident and conversion to Judaism ===
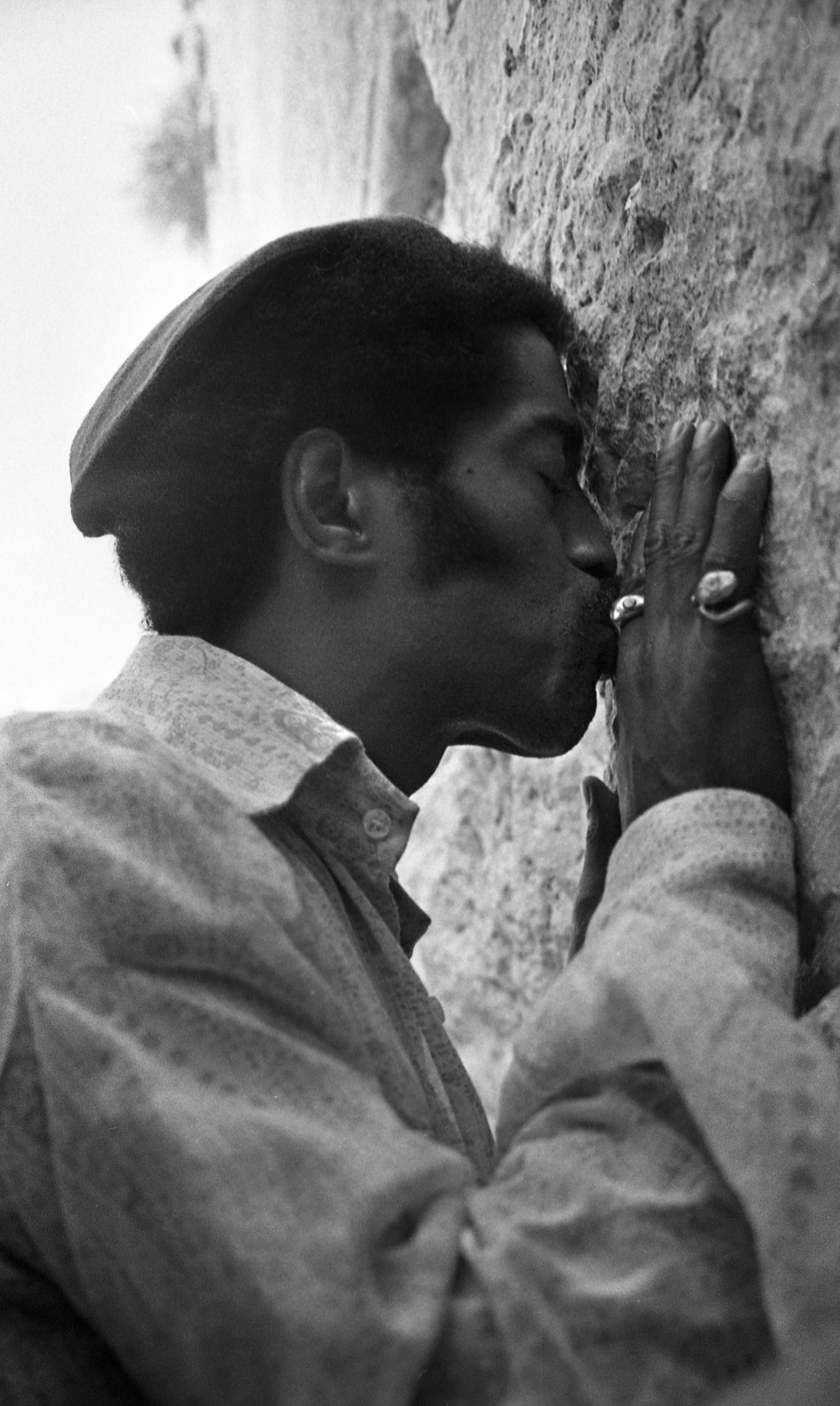
Davis at the Western Wall, Jerusalem, during a tour of Israel, 1969

Davis nearly died in an automobile accident on November 19, 1954, near San Bernardino, California, as he was driving to Los Angeles from Las Vegas. During the previous year, he had started a friendship with comedian and host Eddie Cantor, who had given him a mezuzah. Instead of putting it by his door as a traditional blessing, Davis wore it around his neck for good luck; the only time when he forgot to wear it was the night of the accident.

The accident occurred at a fork in U.S. Route 66 at Cajon Boulevard and Kendall Drive when a driver who had missed turning at the fork reversed her car in Davis's lane, causing Davis's car to strike hers. Davis lost his left eye, which was damaged by the bullet-shaped horn button (a standard feature in 1954 and 1955 Cadillacs). His friend, actor Jeff Chandler, said that he would give one of his own eyes to keep Davis from total blindness. Davis wore an eye patch for at least six months following the accident. He was featured with the patch on the cover of his debut album and during an appearance on What's My Line? wearing the patch. Later, Davis was fitted for a glass eye, which he wore for the rest of his life.

In the hospital, Cantor described to Davis the similarities between Jewish and Black cultures. Davis, born to a Catholic mother and Baptist father, was raised Catholic and began studying Jewish history as an adult, converting to Judaism several years later in 1960. One passage from his readings (from the book A History of the Jews by Abram L. Sachar) describing the endurance of the Jewish people interested him in particular: "The Jews would not die. Three millennia of prophetic teaching had given them an unwavering spirit of resignation and had created in them a will to live which no disaster could crush." The accident marked a turning point in Davis's career, taking him from a well-known entertainer to a national celebrity.

=== Relationships and marriages ===
In 1957, Davis was involved with actress Kim Novak, who was under contract with Columbia Pictures. Because Novak was white, Columbia president Harry Cohn worried that public backlash against the relationship could hurt the studio. There are several accounts of what happened, but they agree that Davis was threatened by organized crime figures close to Cohn. According to one account, Cohn called racketeer John Roselli, who was told to inform Davis that he must stop seeing Novak. To try to scare Davis, Roselli had him kidnapped for a few hours. Another account relates that the threat was conveyed to Davis's father by mobster Mickey Cohen. Davis was threatened with the loss of his other eye or a broken leg if he did not marry a black woman within two days. Davis sought the protection of Chicago mobster Sam Giancana, who said that he could protect him in Chicago and Las Vegas but not California.

Davis briefly married black dancer Loray White in 1958 to protect himself from mob violence; Davis had previously dated White, who was 23, twice divorced, and had a six-year-old child. He paid her a lump sum ($10,000 or $25,000) to engage in a marriage on the condition that it would be dissolved before the end of the year. Davis became inebriated at the wedding and attempted to strangle White en route to their wedding suite. Checking on him later, Davis's personal assistant Arthur Silber Jr. found Davis with a gun to his head. Davis despairingly said to Silber, "Why won't they let me live my life?" The couple never lived together and commenced divorce proceedings in September 1958. The divorce was granted in April 1959.

In 1959, Davis had "a short, stormy, exciting relationship" with Nichelle Nichols.

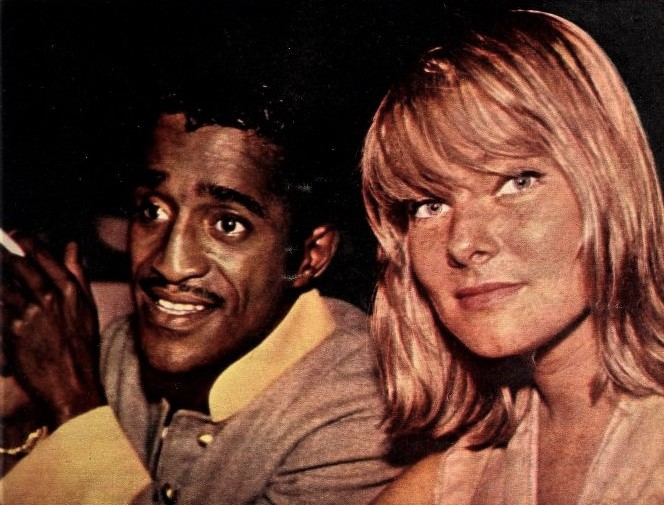
Davis and May Britt in 1960

In 1960, there was another racially charged public controversy when Davis married white Swedish-born actress May Britt in a ceremony officiated by rabbi William M. Kramer at Temple Israel of Hollywood. While interracial marriage had been legal in California since 1948, anti-miscegenation laws in the U.S. still stood in 23 states, and a 1958 Gallup poll revealed that only 4% of Americans supported marriage between black and white spouses. During 1964 through 1966, Davis received racially motivated hate mail while starring in the Broadway adaptation of Golden Boy, in which his character is in a relationship with a white woman, paralleling his own interracial relationship. Although New York State had no laws against interracial marriage, debate about it was still ongoing in the country as Loving v. Virginia was being adjudicated. It was only in 1967 after the musical finished that anti-miscegenation laws in all states were ruled unconstitutional via the 14th Amendment adopted in 1868 by the U.S. Supreme Court.

Britt and Davis's daughter Tracey Davis (July 5, 1961 – November 2, 2020) alleged in a 2014 book that Davis was not permitted to perform at John F. Kennedy's Presidential inauguration because of his marriage to a white woman. The snub was confirmed by director Sam Pollard, who revealed in a 2017 American Masters documentary that Davis's invitation to perform at the inauguration was abruptly canceled on the night of Kennedy's inaugural party.

Davis and Britt adopted two sons. Davis performed almost continuously and spent little time with his wife. They divorced in 1968 after Davis admitted to an affair with singer Lola Falana.

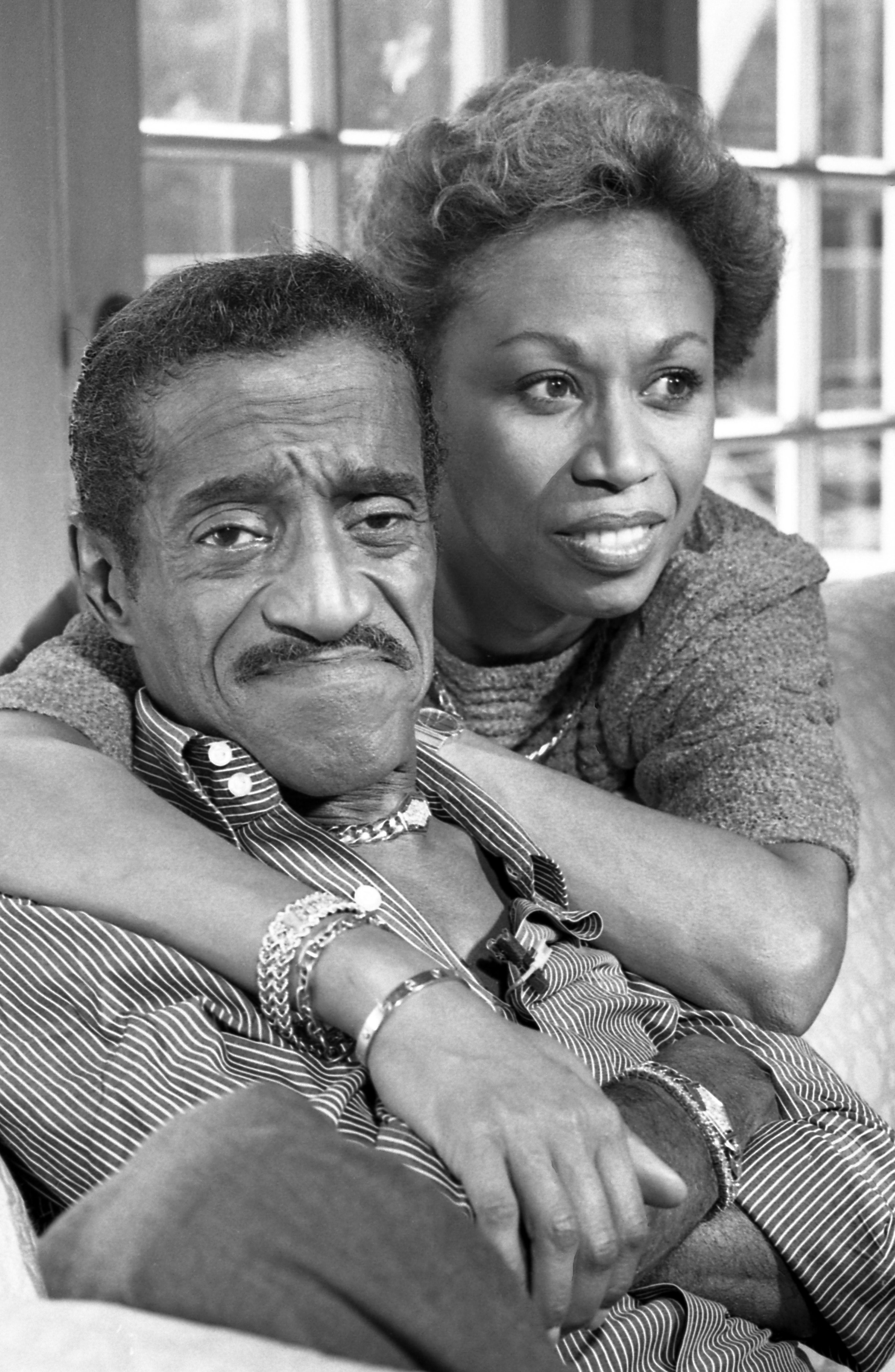
Davis with his third wife, Altovise Gore, in 1986

In 1968, Davis started dating Altovise Gore, a dancer in Golden Boy. They were married on May 11, 1970, by Jesse Jackson and adopted a son, Manny, in 1989. They remained married until his death in 1990. Toward the end of their marriage, Altovise Davis was sharing her mansion with Davis's girlfriend.

=== Interests ===
Davis was an avid photographer who enjoyed shooting pictures of family and acquaintances. His body of work was detailed in a 2007 book by Burt Boyar titled Photo by Sammy Davis, Jr.

Davis was an enthusiastic shooter and gun owner who participated in fast-draw competitions. Johnny Cash recalled that Davis was said to be capable of drawing and firing a Colt Single Action Army revolver in less than a quarter of a second.

In his 1989 autobiography, Why Me?, Davis related that after 1973 comedy pilot Poor Devil, he became friends with Anton LaVey, the founder high priest of the Church of Satan, that he became an honorary warlock in the church, which included accepting an invitation to a 1968 church ceremony in the Hollywood Hills that ended in a drug-fueled orgy. According to Davis, he and LaVey severed ties in 1984, but Davis continued to perform Satanic rituals into his final days. Actor and comedian Eddie Murphy said in 2019 that Davis was a devil worshipper who personally told him that "Satan is as powerful as God."

=== Health ===
After Davis's marriage to May Britt ended in 1968, Davis turned to alcohol. He also "found solace in drugs, particularly cocaine and amyl nitrite" and experimented with pornography.

After a bout with cirrhosis due to years of drinking, Davis announced his sponsorship of the Sammy Davis Jr. National Liver Institute in Newark, New Jersey in 1985.

==== Final illness and death ====
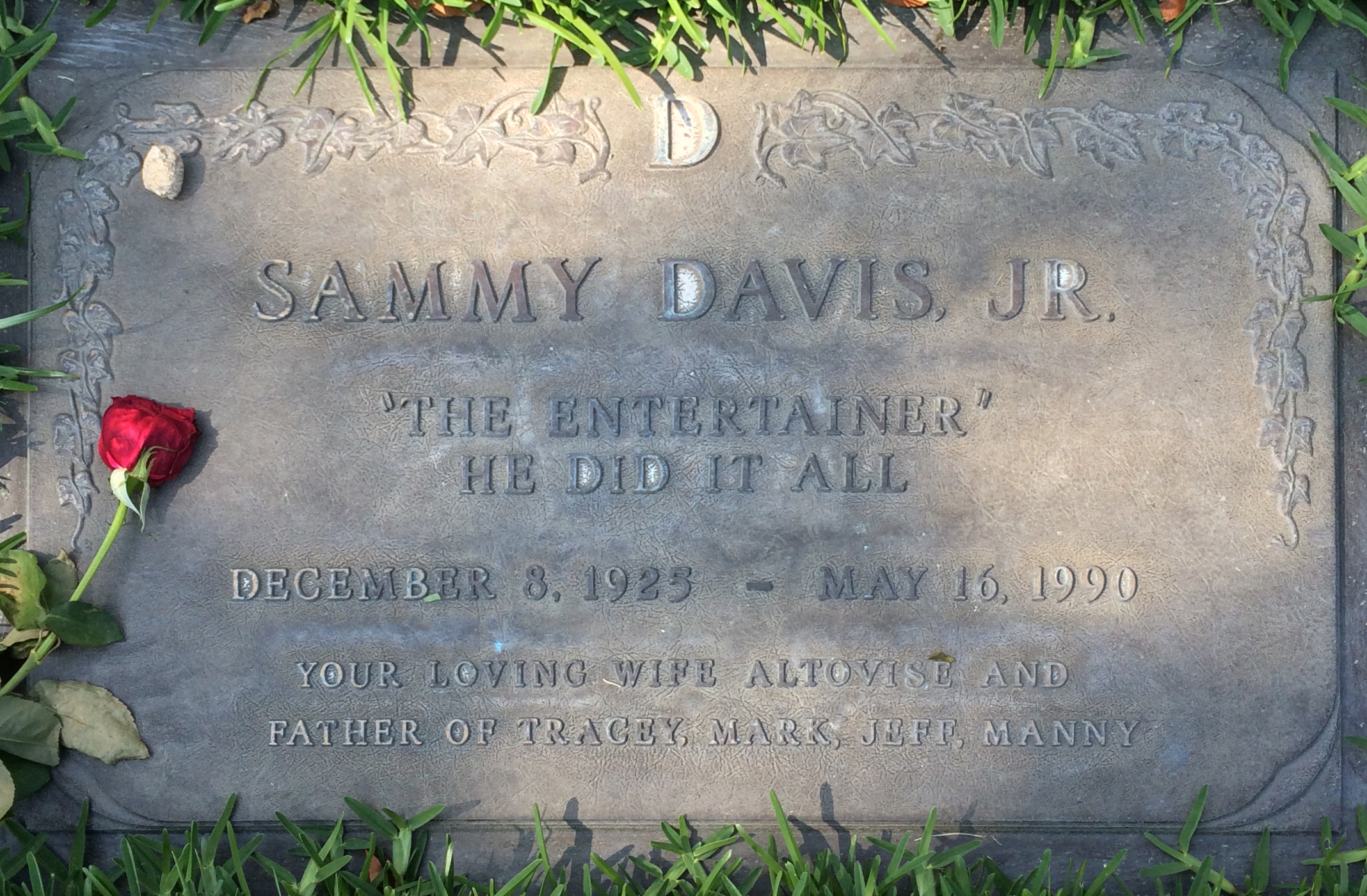
Davis's grave in the Garden of Honor, Forest Lawn Glendale

In August 1989, Davis began to develop symptoms of cancer – a tickle in his throat and an inability to taste food. Doctors found a malignant tumor in Davis's throat. He was a heavy smoker and had often smoked up to four packs of cigarettes a day as an adult. When told that surgery (laryngectomy) offered him the best chance of survival, Davis replied he would rather keep his voice than have a part of his throat removed; he was treated with definitive radiation therapy. His larynx was later removed when his cancer recurred. He was released from the hospital on March 13, 1990.

Davis died of complications from throat cancer two months later at his home in Beverly Hills, California, on May 16, 1990, at age 64. His funeral was attended by Little Richard and Stevie Wonder among others. He was buried at Forest Lawn Memorial Park in Glendale, California. On May 18, 1990, two days after his death, the neon lights of the Las Vegas Strip were darkened for ten minutes as a tribute. Several media outlets reported his death alongside Muppets creator Jim Henson, who died the same day.

=== Estate ===
Davis left the bulk of his estate, estimated at $4,000,000, to his widow Altovise Davis, but he owed the IRS $5,200,000, which after interest and penalties had increased to over $7,000,000. Altovise became liable for his debt because they had filed jointly and she had co-signed their tax returns. She was forced to auction his personal possessions and real estate. Some of his friends in the industry, including Quincy Jones, Joey Bishop, Ed Asner, Jayne Meadows, and Steve Allen, participated in a fundraising concert at the Sands Hotel in Las Vegas. Altovise and the IRS reached a settlement in 1997. After she died in 2009, their son Manny was named executor of the estate and majority-rights holder of his intellectual property.

== Legacy ==
=== Portrayals ===
- SCTV's The Sammy Maudlin Show sketches were inspired by the syndicated talk show called Sammy & Company (April 5, 1975 – March 19, 1977).
- In an episode of Charlie's Angels, Davis had a dual role, playing both himself and a Sammy Davis Jr. impersonator who is kidnapped by mistake (in a comic relief scene, the impersonator beats up a candy machine which does not give him his candy, a spoof of Davis's song "The Candy Man").
- Comedian Jim Carrey has portrayed Davis on stage, in the 1983 film Copper Mountain, and in a stand-up routine.
- On Saturday Night Live, Davis has been portrayed by Garrett Morris, Eddie Murphy, Billy Crystal and Tim Meadows.
- Davis was portrayed on the popular sketch comedy show In Living Color by Tommy Davidson, notably a parody of the film Ghost, in which the ghost of Davis enlists the help of Whoopi Goldberg to communicate with his wife.
- David Raynr portrayed Davis in the 1992 miniseries Sinatra, a television film about the life of Frank Sinatra.
- In the comedy film Wayne's World 2 (1993), Tim Meadows portrays Davis in the dream sequence with Michael A. Nickles as Jim Morrison.
- In the sitcom Malcolm & Eddie (1996), Eddie Sherman (played by comedian Eddie Griffin) impersonates Davis in the episode "Sh-Boing-Boing" to help his partner Malcolm McGee (played by Malcolm-Jamal Warner) reconcile his grandparents' relationship.
- Davis was portrayed by Don Cheadle in the HBO film The Rat Pack, a 1998 television film about the group of entertainers. Cheadle won a Golden Globe Award for his performance.
- He was portrayed by Paul Sharma in the 2003 West End production Rat Pack Confidential.
- Davis was portrayed in 2008 by Keith Powell in an episode of 30 Rock titled "Subway Hero".
- In September 2009, the musical Sammy: Once in a Lifetime premiered at the Old Globe Theatre in San Diego with a book, music, and lyrics by Leslie Bricusse, and additional songs by Bricusse and Anthony Newley. The title role was played by Tony Award nominee Obba Babatundé.
- Comedian Billy Crystal has portrayed Davis on Saturday Night Live, in his stand-up routines, and at the 2012 Oscars.
- Actor Phaldut Sharma created the comedy web-series I Gotta Be Me (2015), following a frustrated soap star as he performs as Sammy in a Rat Pack tribute show.
- In January 2017, Davis's estate joined a production team led by Lionel Richie, Lorenzo di Bonaventura, and Mike Menchel to make a movie based on Davis's life and show-biz career.

== Honors and awards ==
Shortly before his death in 1990, ABC aired the TV special Sammy Davis, Jr. 60th Anniversary Celebration, produced by George Schlatter. An all-star cast, including Frank Sinatra, Dean Martin, Michael Jackson, Whitney Houston, Eddie Murphy, Diahann Carroll, Clint Eastwood, and Ella Fitzgerald, paid tribute to Davis. The show was nominated for six Primetime Emmy Awards, winning Outstanding Variety, Music or Comedy. Starting in 1989, Don Cornelius, host of the nationally syndicated dance show, Soul Train, named his "Entertainer of the Year" award after Davis, with fellow American entertainer Michael Jackson being the first recipient.

=== Grammy Awards ===
Year	Category	Song	Result	Notes
2002	Grammy Hall of Fame Award	"What Kind of Fool Am I?"	Inducted	Recorded in 1962
2001	Grammy Lifetime Achievement Award		Winner	Posthumously
1972	Pop Male Vocalist	"Candy Man"	Nominee	
1962	Record of the Year	"What Kind of Fool Am I?"	Nominee	
1962	Male Solo Vocal Performance	"What Kind of Fool Am I?"	Nominee	

=== Emmy Awards ===
Year	Category	Program	Result
1990	Outstanding Variety, Music or Comedy Special	Sammy Davis Jr.'s 60th Anniversary Celebration	Won
1989	Outstanding Guest Actor in a Comedy Series	The Cosby Show	Nominated
1980	Outstanding Cameo Appearance in a Daytime Drama Series	One Life to Live	Nominated
1966	Outstanding Variety Special	The Swinging World of Sammy Davis Jr.	Nominated
1956	Best Specialty Act — Single or Group	Sammy Davis Jr.	Nominated

=== Other honors ===
Year	Category	Organization	Program	Result
2022		National Multicultural Western Heritage Museum		Inducted
2017	20th Century Early Music Influence	National Rhythm & Blues Hall of Fame		Inducted
2008	International Civil Rights Walk of Fame	Martin Luther King Jr. National Historic Site		Inducted
2006	Las Vegas Walk of Stars	front of Riviera Hotel		Inducted
1989	NAACP Hall of Fame	NAACP		Inducted
1987	Kennedy Center Honors	John F. Kennedy Center for the Performing Arts		Honoree
1985	Worst Supporting Actor	Golden Raspberry Awards	Cannonball Run II (1984)	Nominee
1977	Best TV Actor — Musical/Comedy	Golden Globe	Sammy and Company (1975)	Nominee
1974	Special Citation Award	National Academy of Television Arts and Sciences		Winner
1968	NAACP Spingarn Medal Award	NAACP		Winner
1965	Best Actor — Musical	Tony Award	Golden Boy	Nominee
1961	Man of the Year	American Guild of Variety Artists		Winner
1960	Recording	Hollywood Walk of Fame		Inducted

== Discography ==
Studio albums

- Starring Sammy Davis Jr. (1955)
- Just for Lovers (1955)
- Mr. Wonderful (1956)
- Here's Lookin' at You (1956)
- Sammy Swings (1957)
- Boy Meets Girl (with Carmen McRae) (1957)
- Sammy Jumps with Joya (with Joya Sherrill) (1957)
- It's All Over but the Swingin' (1957)
- Mood to Be Wooed (1958)
- All the Way... and Then Some! (1958)
- Porgy and Bess (with Carmen McRae) (1959)
- Sammy Awards (1960)
- I Gotta Right to Swing (1960)
- The Wham of Sam (1961)
- Mr. Entertainment (1961)
- Sammy Davis Jr. Belts the Best of Broadway (1962)
- The Sammy Davis Jr. All-Star Spectacular (1962)
- What Kind of Fool Am I and Other Show-Stoppers (1962)
- As Long as She Needs Me (1963)
- Sammy Davis Jr. Salutes the Stars of the London Palladium (1964)
- The Shelter of Your Arms (1964)
- Sammy Davis Jr. Sings Mel Tormé's "California Suite" (1964)
- Sammy Davis Jr. Sings the Big Ones for Young Lovers (1964)
- When the Feeling Hits You! (with Sam Butera and the Witnesses) (1965)
- Our Shining Hour (with Count Basie) (1965)
- If I Ruled the World (1965)
- The Nat King Cole Songbook (1965)
- Sammy's Back on Broadway (1965)
- The Sammy Davis Jr. Show (1966)
- Sammy Davis Jr. Sings and Laurindo Almeida Plays (with Laurindo Almeida) (1966)
- Sammy Davis Jr. Sings the Complete "Dr. Dolittle" (1967)
- Lonely Is the Name (1968)
- I've Gotta Be Me (1968)
- The Goin's Great (1969)
- Something for Everyone (1970)
- Sammy Steps Out (1970)
- Sammy Davis Jr. Now (1972)
- Portrait of Sammy Davis Jr. (1972)
- That's Entertainment! (1974)
- The Song and Dance Man (1976)
- Sings The Great TV-Tunes (1977)
- Closest of Friends (1982)

== Work on screen and stage ==
=== Filmography ===
- Rufus Jones for President (1933) – Rufus Jones
- Seasoned Greetings (1933) – Henry Johnson – Store Customer
- Sweet and Low (1947) – Member, Will Maston Trio
- Meet Me in Las Vegas (1956) – Sammy Davis Jr. (voice, uncredited)
- Anna Lucasta (1958) – Danny Johnson
- Porgy and Bess (1959) – Sportin' Life
- Ocean's 11 (1960) – Josh Howard
- Pepe (1960) – Sammy Davis Jr.
- Sergeants 3 (1962) – Jonah Williams
- Convicts 4 (1962) – Wino
- The Threepenny Opera (1963) – Street Singer
- Johnny Cool (1963) – Educated
- Robin and the 7 Hoods (1964) – Will
- Nightmare in the Sun (1965) – Truck driver
- The Second Best Secret Agent in the Whole Wide World (1965, title song) – Singer behind opening credits (uncredited)
- A Man Called Adam (1966) – Adam Johnson
- Alice in Wonderland (or What's a Nice Kid Like You Doing in a Place Like This?) (1966) – Cheshire Cat
- Salt and Pepper (1968) – Charles Salt
- The Fall (1969)
- The Pigeon (1969) – Larry Miller (unsold TV pilot produced by Aaron Spelling)
- Sweet Charity (1969) – Big Daddy
- One More Time (1970) – Charles Salt
- Elvis: That's the Way It Is (1970)
- The Trackers (1971) – TV movie with Ernest Borgnine
- Diamonds Are Forever (1971) – Casino Punter (deleted scene)
- Save the Children (1973)
- Poor Devil (1973; unsold pilot of a TV series)
- Gone with the West, also known outside the U.S. as Little Moon and Jud McGraw (1975) – Kid Dandy
- Madeleine (1977) – Spud The Scarecrow (singing voice)
- Sammy Stops the World (1978) – Littlechap
- The Cannonball Run (1981) – Morris Fenderbaum
- Heidi's Song (1982) – Head Ratte (voice)
- Cracking Up (1983)
- Broadway Danny Rose (1984) – Thanksgiving Parade's Grand Marshall (uncredited)
- Cannonball Run II (1984) – Morris Fenderbaum
- Alice in Wonderland (1985) – The Caterpillar / Father William
- That's Dancing! (1985)
- Knights of the City (1986)
- The Perils of P.K. (1986)
- Moon over Parador (1988)
- Tap (1989) – Little Mo
- Hanna-Barbera's 50th: A Yabba Dabba Doo Celebration – Himself (1989)
- The Kid Who Loved Christmas (1990) – Sideman (final film role); posthumous release

=== Television ===
- What's My Line? – "Sammy Davis Jr." (1955)
- General Electric Theater – "The Patsy" (1960) Season 8 Episode 21
- Frontier Circus - episode Coals Of Fire (1961)
- Lawman – episode Blue Boss and Willie Shay" (1961)
- The Dick Powell Show – episode "The Legend" (1962)
- Hennesey – episode "Tight Quarters" (1962)
- The Rifleman – 2 episodes "Two Ounces of Tin (4.21)" (February 19, 1962) and "The Most Amazing Man (5.9)" (November 27, 1962)
- 77 Sunset Strip – episode "The Gang's All Here" (1962)
- Ben Casey – episode "Allie" (1963)
- The Patty Duke Show – episode "Will the Real Sammy Davis Please Hang Up?" (1965)
- The Sammy Davis Jr. Show – Host (January 7, 1966)
- Alice in Wonderland or What's a Nice Kid Like You Doing in a Place Like This? (March 30, 1966)
- The Wild Wild West – episode "The Night of the Returning Dead" (October 14, 1966)
- Batman – "The Clock King's Crazy Crimes" (1966)
- I Dream of Jeannie – episode "The Greatest Entertainer in the World" (1967)
- Rowan & Martin's Laugh-In – Here Comes The Judge skit (1968–70, 1971, 1973)
- The Mod Squad – three episodes: "Keep the Faith Baby" (1969), "Survival House" (1970), and "The Song of Willie" (1970)
- The Beverly Hillbillies – episode Manhattan Hillbillies (1969)
- The Name of the Game – episode "I Love You, Billy Baker" (1970)
- Here's Lucy (1970)
- The Courtship of Eddie's Father – episode "A Little Help From My Friend" (1972)
- All in the Family – episode "Sammy's Visit" (1972)
- Chico and the Man – episode "Sammy Stops In" (1975)
- The Carol Burnett Show (1975)
- Sammy & Company – host/performer (1975–1977)
- Charlie's Angels – episode "Sammy Davis, Jr. Kidnap Caper" (1977)
- Sanford – episodes "Dinner and George's" (cameo) and "The Benefit" (1980)
- Archie Bunker's Place – episode "The Return of Sammy" (1980)
- General Hospital – episode Benefit for Sports Center (1982)
- General Hospital – Eddie Phillips (father to Bryan Phillips) (1983)
- Channel Seven Perth's Telethon (1983)
- The Jeffersons – episode "What Makes Sammy Run?" (1984)
- Fantasy Island – episode "Mr. Bojangles and the Dancer/Deuces are Wild" (1984)
- Gimme a Break! – episode "The Lookalike" (1985)
- Alice in Wonderland
- Hunter – episode "Ring of Honor" (1989)
- The Cosby Show – episode "No Way, Baby" (1989)
- Sammy Davis, Jr. 60th Anniversary Celebration (1990) – 2 1/2 hour all star TV special

=== Theater ===
- Mr. Wonderful (1956), musical
- Golden Boy (1964), musical – Tony Nomination for Best Actor in a Musical
- Sammy (1974), special performance featuring Davis with the Nicholas Brothers
- Stop the World – I Want to Get Off (1978), musical revival

== See also ==
- List of Afro-Latinos
- History of the Jews in the African diaspora
- List of Hispanic and Latino Americans
- List of people from Harlem
