= Morton Stevens =

American television and film score composer

- Born: Morton Aaron Suckno; January 30, 1929; Newark, New Jersey, United States
- Died: November 11, 1991 (aged 62) Encino, California, United States
- Occupations: Composer

Morton Stevens (January 30, 1929 – November 11, 1991) was an American film score composer. In 1965, he became director of music for CBS West Coast operations. He is probably best known for composing the theme music for Hawaii Five-O, a CBS television series for which he won two Emmy Awards in 1970 and 1974, and was a gold record for The Ventures. Stevens was taught by Oscar-winning composer Jerry Goldsmith, with whom he frequently collaborated on other projects.

== Biography ==
Stevens graduated from the Juilliard School in 1950, and within a few years began working as an arranger/conductor for Sammy Davis Jr. After Davis's longtime conductor, George Rhodes, died in 1985, Stevens was among those who filled that role again sporadically until Davis' death in 1990. In his later years, Stevens worked as conductor for other Vegas legends, including Jerry Lewis, and was musical director for the "Rat Pack" tour featuring Davis, Frank Sinatra, Dean Martin, and—after Martin quit—Liza Minnelli. His classic theme for Hawaii Five-O was later re-recorded for the remake of the television series in 2010. He won two Primetime Emmy Award for Outstanding Music Composition for a Series for his work on Hawaii Five-O and was nominated seven other times for work on television programs, including the 1969 Hawaii Five-O pilot episode, Gunsmoke and Police Woman.

His film work included scores for films and TV movies such as Wild and Wonderful (1964), The Spy with My Face (1965), Deadly Harvest (1972), The Strangers in 7A (1972), The Horror at 37,000 Feet (1973), The Disappearance of Flight 412 (1974), Code Name: Diamond Head (1977), Wheels (1978), The One Man Jury (1978), Women in White (1979), Great White (1982) They Still Call Me Bruce (1987), Act of Piracy (1988) and the Jerry Lewis films Hardly Working (1980), Slapstick of Another Kind (1982) and Cracking Up (1983).

In addition to "Hawaii Five-O", Stevens worked on the earlier smash 1960s CBS Television series dealing with an island of a different kind: "Gilligan's Island", 1964–1967, collaborating on the series with composers John Williams, Gerald Fried, Frank Comstock, and Lyn Murray.

A musical cue by Stevens from Hawaii Five-O was adapted into the introductory music used to accompany the logo for CBS specials from 1973 to 1991. Stevens also composed "So Old, So Young", used as the theme music (in two separate arrangements) for CBS' primetime (from 1966 to 1978) and late night (from 1972 to 1985) movie broadcasts.

Stevens died of pancreatic cancer in Encino, California at the age of 62.
