= Großes Schauspielhaus =

Defunct theatre

Coordinates: 52°31′22″N 13°23′10″E

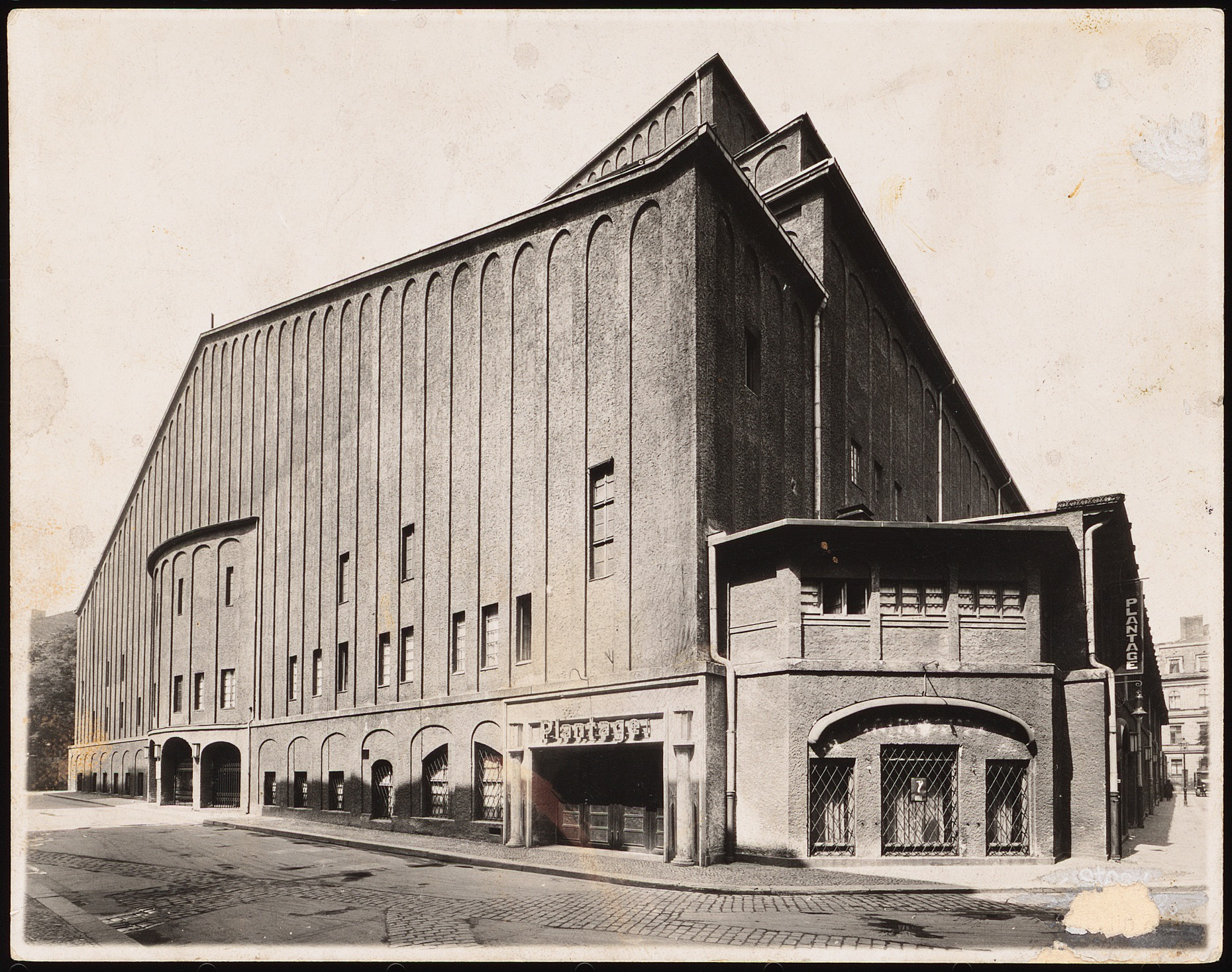
The Spree frontage of the theatre in 1919

The Großes Schauspielhaus (Great Playhouse) was a revue theatre in the Mitte district of Berlin, Germany. It was founded by the Deutsches Nationaltheater AG, a vehicle of Max Reinhardt, in 1919 through the expressionist renovation of a 19th-century market hall by Hans Poelzig. Following the Nazi seizure of power, the theatre was taken over by the German Labour Front, renamed Theater des Volkes lit. 'Theatre of the People', and stripped of its expressionist decoration. After the Second World War, it was reestablished under the Soviet Occupation as a variety venue and eventually renamed Friedrichstadt-Palast. The building was closed in 1980 and demolished in 1985, and the theatre's legacy is continued by the present Friedrichstadt-Palast (often called "Neuer Friedrichstadt-Palast" in recognition of the theatre's prior location).

== History ==
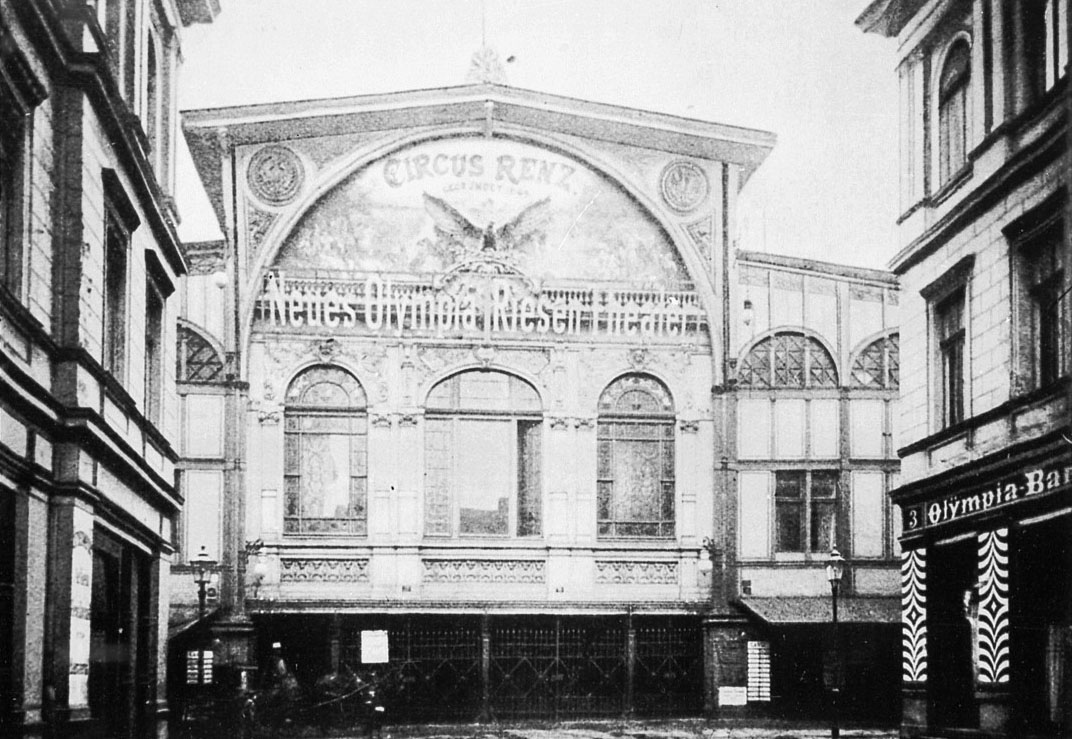
Street view of the Circus Renz in 1898

The building that would later become the Großes Schauspielhaus was built on the right bank of the Spree, on the Schiffbauerdamm, between 1865 and 1867 as Berlin's first modern, purpose-built market hall. It was designed in a loosely neoclassical style by Friedrich Hitzig. Due to the site's marshy condition, the iron-framed building was built on extensive oak piling. However, due to lacking public interest in the hall, it was closed after a few months of operation. After a brief stint as a food depot, including for the Prussian Army during the Franco-Prussian War, it became the 5,000-seat Markthallen-Zirkus (Market Hall Circus) in 1873 under Albert Salamonsky. Thereafter, its street address would be Am Zirkus 1 (By the Circus 1). From 1879 to 1897, the notable Circus Renz used the space after its prior building was demolished to build Friedrichstraße Station. The circus's owner, Ernst Renz, had the building's audience capacity expanded to 5,600 in 1888. It was also periodically used as a public event space, and hosted Robert Koch's international congress on tuberculosis in 1890. Upon the closing of the Circus Renz, the building was auctioned to Bolossy Kiralfy and Hermann Haller, who gave the building its first theatrical use, expanding the stage and removing obstructions in the audience. However, demand for the Kiralfy-Haller duo's extravaganzas was low. From 1899 until 1918, the building again served as a circus under the Circus Schumann organisation.

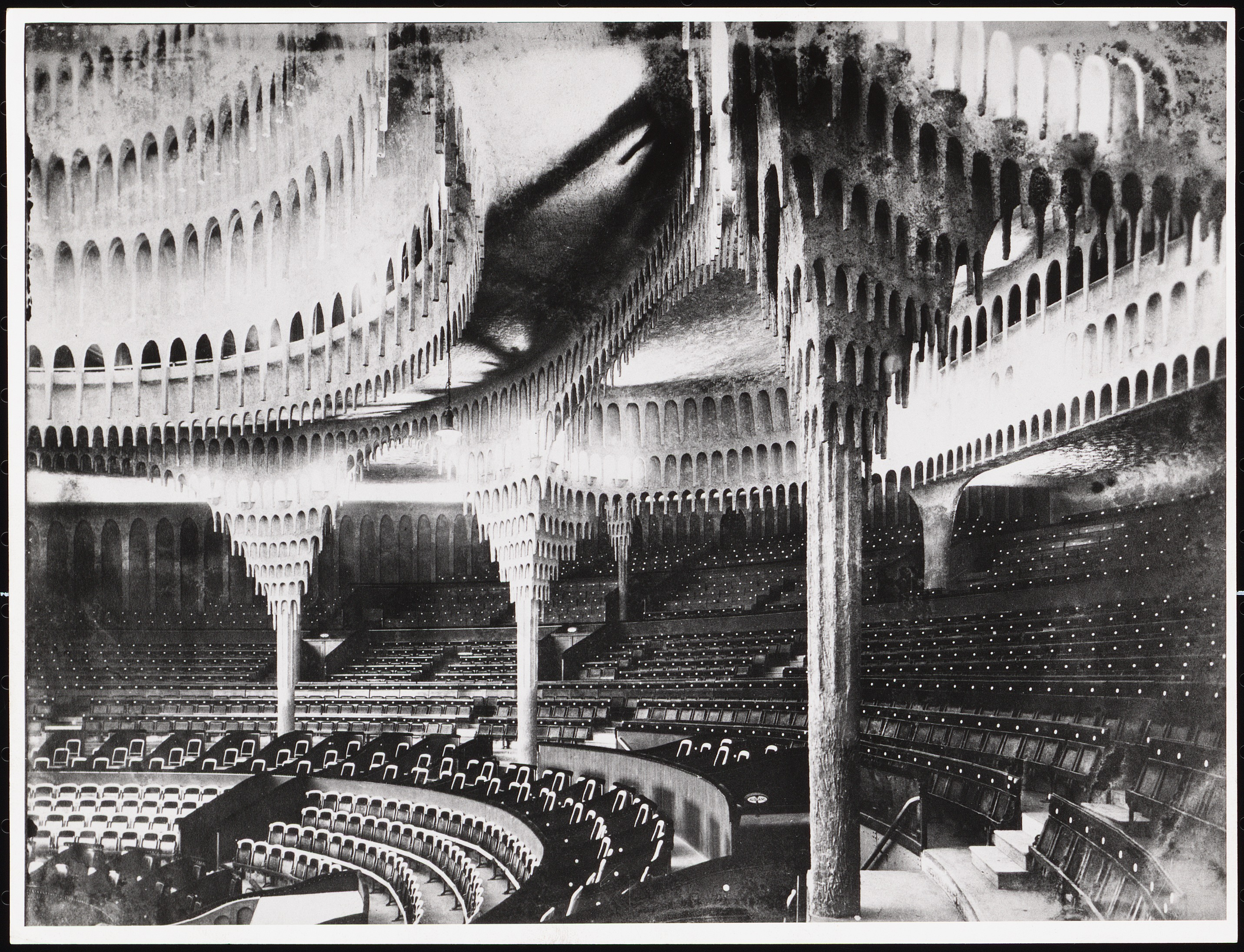
Interior of main hall with the landmark stalactite cave design by Hans Poelzig

In 1917, the property was sold to Deutsches Nationaltheater AG,a network of theaters managed by Max Reinhardt, a leading figure in Berlin's theater scene. Reinhardt, who became director of the Deutsches Theater Berlin in 1905, expanded his influence to include several venues in Berlin and Vienna, such as the Volksbühne and the Theater am Kurfürstendamm. Hans Poelzig was commissioned to rebuild the circus space into a revue theater starting in 1918. He added several stories onto the old market hall and redesigned the interior in a distinctive expressionist style, creating a massive dome and covering the wrought-iron ceiling in hanging stalactite-like stucco, which became known as the "Tropfsteinhöhle" ("stalactite cave"). The foyer was decorated with cantilevered light columns designed in part by Poelzig's wife, Marlene. Between 1919 and 1921, Reinhardt used the Großes Schauspielhaus to stage several productions, including The Oresteia, Danton's Death, and Julius Caesar. These productions were known for their elaborate staging and made full use of the theater's advanced technical features, including a revolving stage, a cyclorama, and an adjustable forestage. The theater was referred to as the "Theater of Five Thousand". In the 1920s, the theater became one of the first venues in Berlin to feature revues, under the direction of Erik Charell. In 1928, participants for a new vocal sextet, the Comedian Harmonists, were recruited from the theatre's in-house choir.

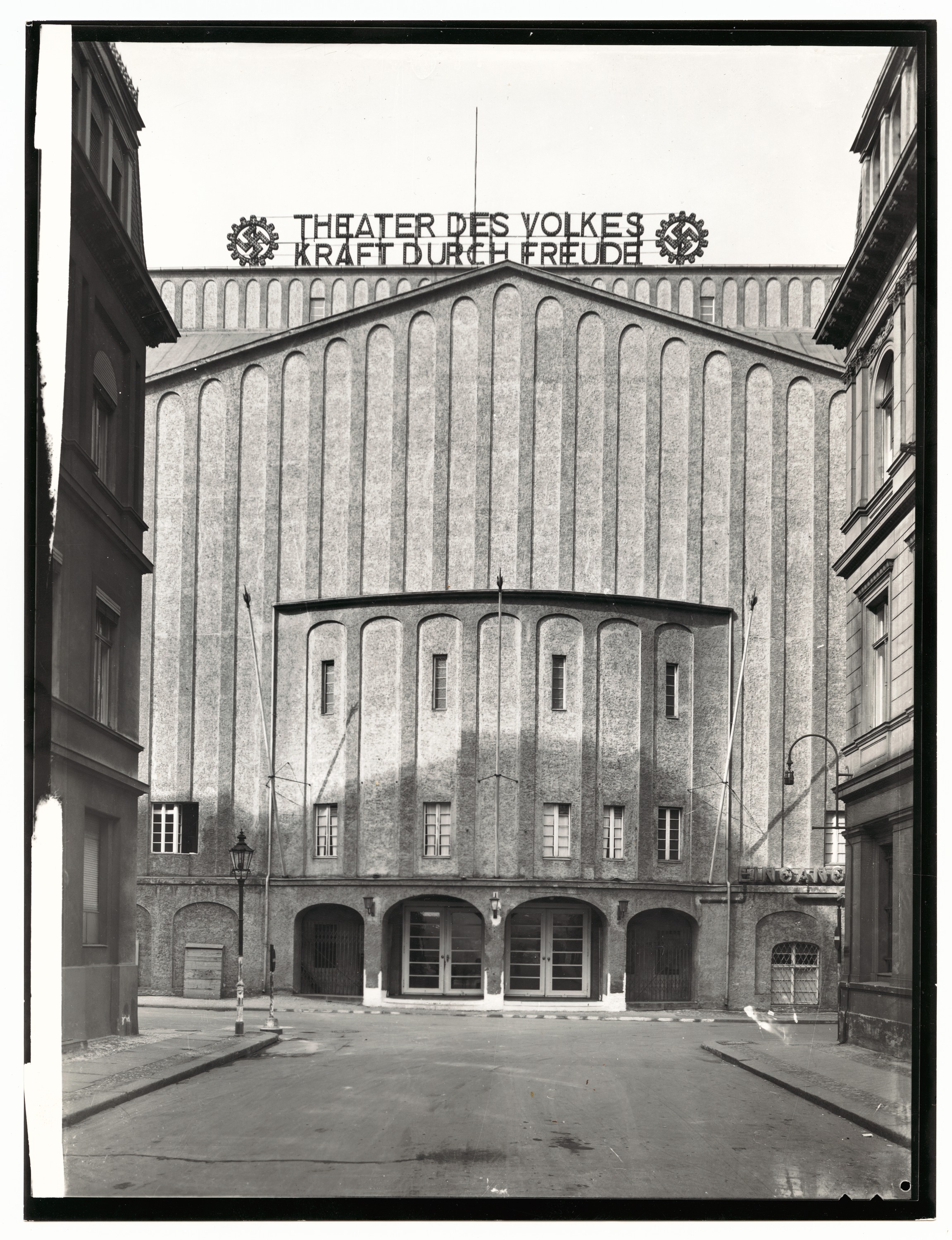
Street view of the theatre in 1941, showing its Nazi-era marquee

During the Great Depression, the Schauspielhaus accrued massive debts (eventually in the millions of Reichsmark), many of them owed to the Bank der Arbeiter, Angestellten und Beamten. Upon the seizure of power by the NSDAP in 1933, the Deutsches Nationaltheater AG's tax-exempt status was revoked, and the organisation buckled under extremely high tax duties. The bank, in the meantime nazified as the Bank der Deutschen Arbeit (subordinate to the German Labour Front), assumed the theatre's debt burden. The previous shareholders, including Reinhardt himself, were coerced to sell their interests in the theatre, at a fraction of their actual value, to the bank. It was subsequently taken over by the German Labour Front.

In 1934, the NSDAP renamed the theatre Theater des Volkes ("Theatre of the People"), which was promoted under the aegis of Strength through Joy program and overseen by Joseph Goebbels. In 1938, workers of the German Labour Front destroyed the expressionist "stalactite cave" and exterior features added by Poelzig, and the interior was redesigned by Nazi architect Fritz Fuß in a typical stripped classical style. A "Führerloge" ("Führer's Loggia") was installed at the back of the theatre space.

The theatre incurred severe damage from bombing and combat in the Second World War, but was reopened as a variety theatre by Marion Spadoni as Palast – Das Varieté der 3000 in August 1945. Spadoni, the forty-year old daughter of a Berlin impresario who had spent her career thus far as a variety performer, distanced the Varieté's fare from the previous plays and revues put on by Reinhardt and Charell in the theatre, and aimed to recreate the type of entertainment defined by venues such as the Wintergarten, Scala, and Plaza theatres prior to the war. Spadoni was also forced to host large communist gatherings, including a vote on the merger of the SPD and KPD and the first functionary's conference of the Socialist Unity Party, by the Soviet Kommandatura. However, Spadoni's time at the theatre, inherently precarious due to her status as a private businesswoman in the Soviet Zone, ended not long after it began: she was accused of collaboration by Soviet authorities and the Varieté was expropriated in 1947.

The theatre was renamed "Friedrichstadt-Palast" upon its expropriation, and continued putting on variety shows in the Spadoni tradition well into the German Democratic Republic. It also frequently hosted events of the official party organs of East Germany, such as the Free German Youth. In 1980, construction at the new Charité hospital nearby caused severe groundwater subsidence, damaging the now over century-old piling and causing structural issues. The theatre was immediately evacuated. The reason for the building's abrupt closing was concealed by East German authorities, as buildings in West Berlin were also affected by the subsidence. The new Friedrichstadt-Palast, only a few blocks away from the original site, was completed in 1984, and the historic building was promptly demolished in 1985. It was photographed in the process of demolition, its light-columns still intact, by Ryuji Miyamoto. Nothing was built in its place, and the site was divided between a Spree-side Plaza, the Bertolt-Brecht Platz (in commemoration of Brecht's work at the adjacent Berliner Ensemble) and an empty lot. In 2014, the empty lot was replaced with a mixed-use building housing a hotel, apartments, and offices.

== Gallery ==
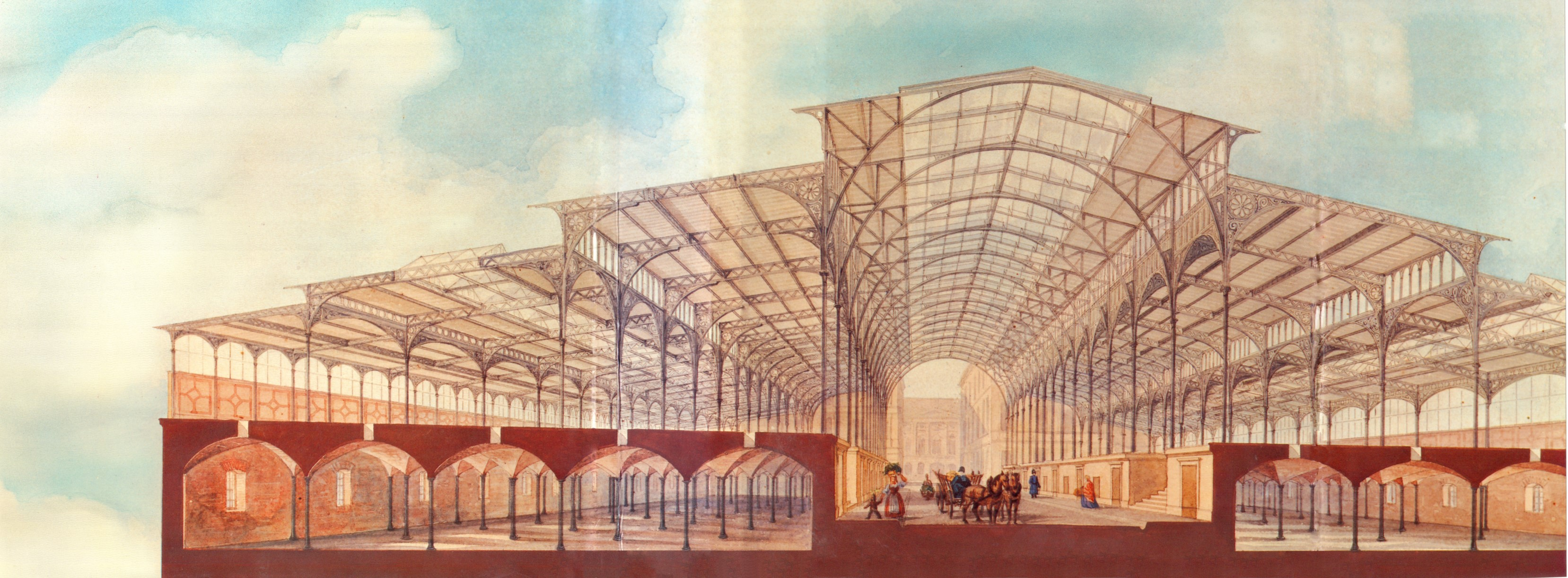
Rendition of the Markthalle Berlin's interior by Hitzig

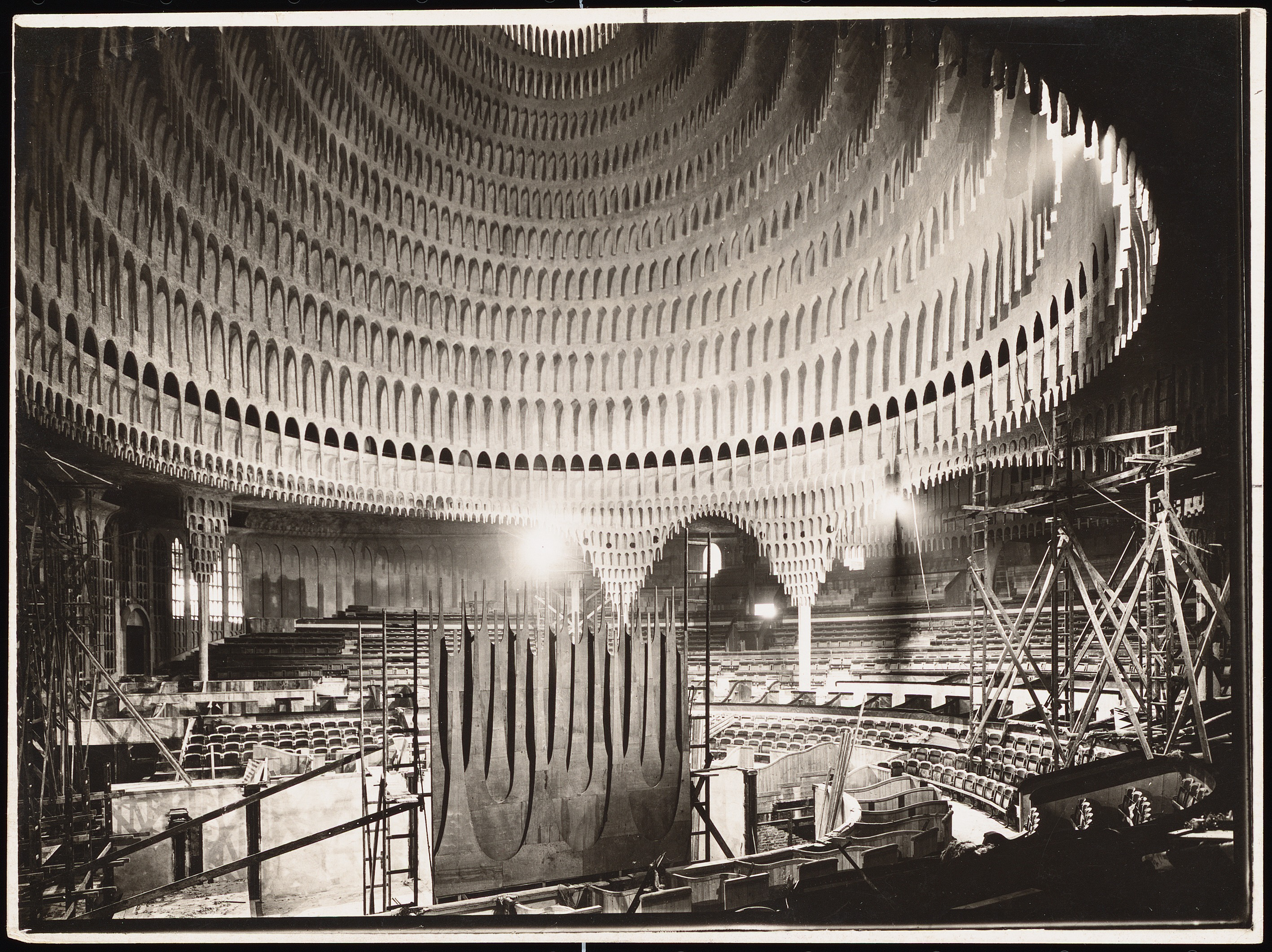
Construction at the Schauspielhaus, c. 1919

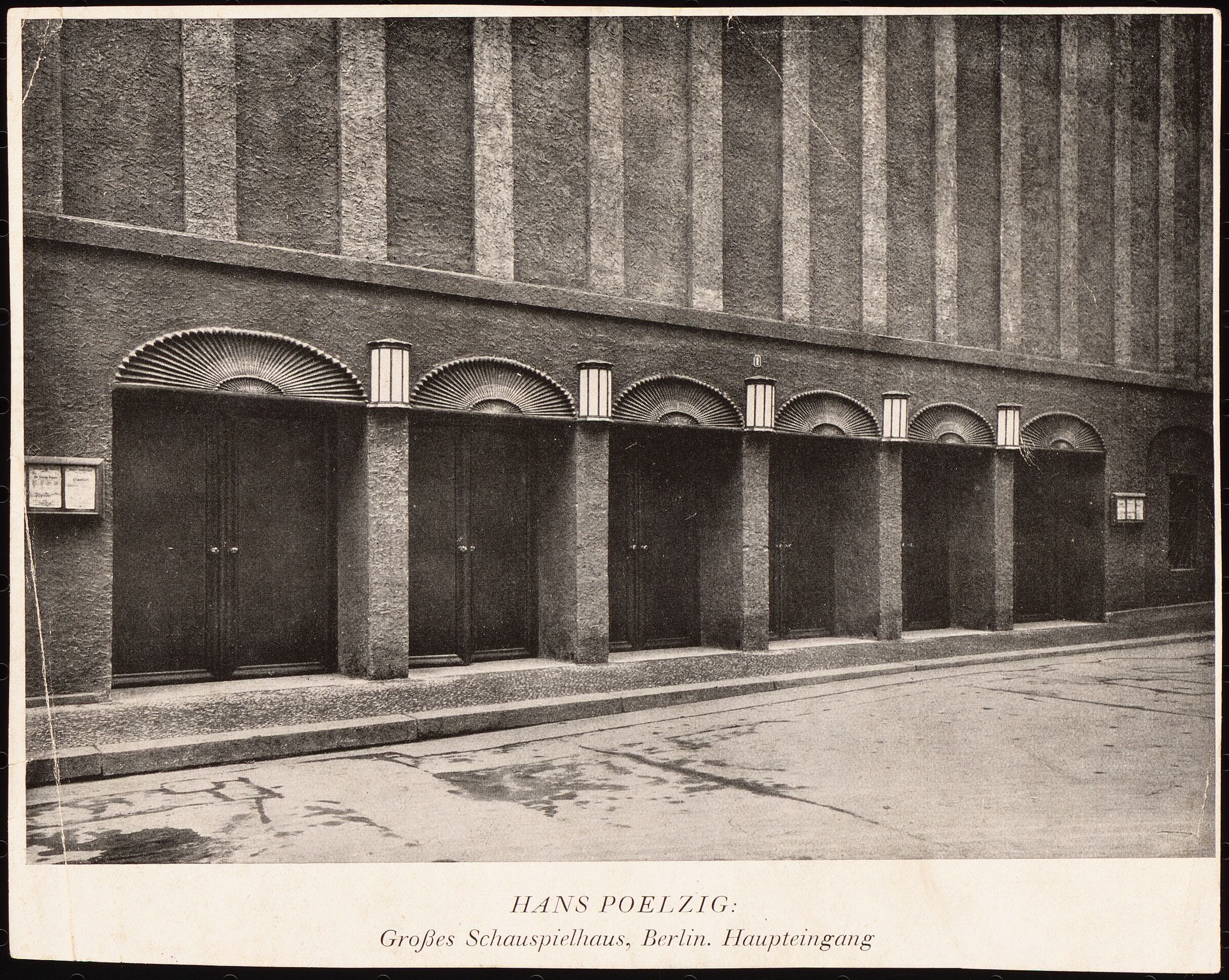
The main entrance to the theatre, c. 1919

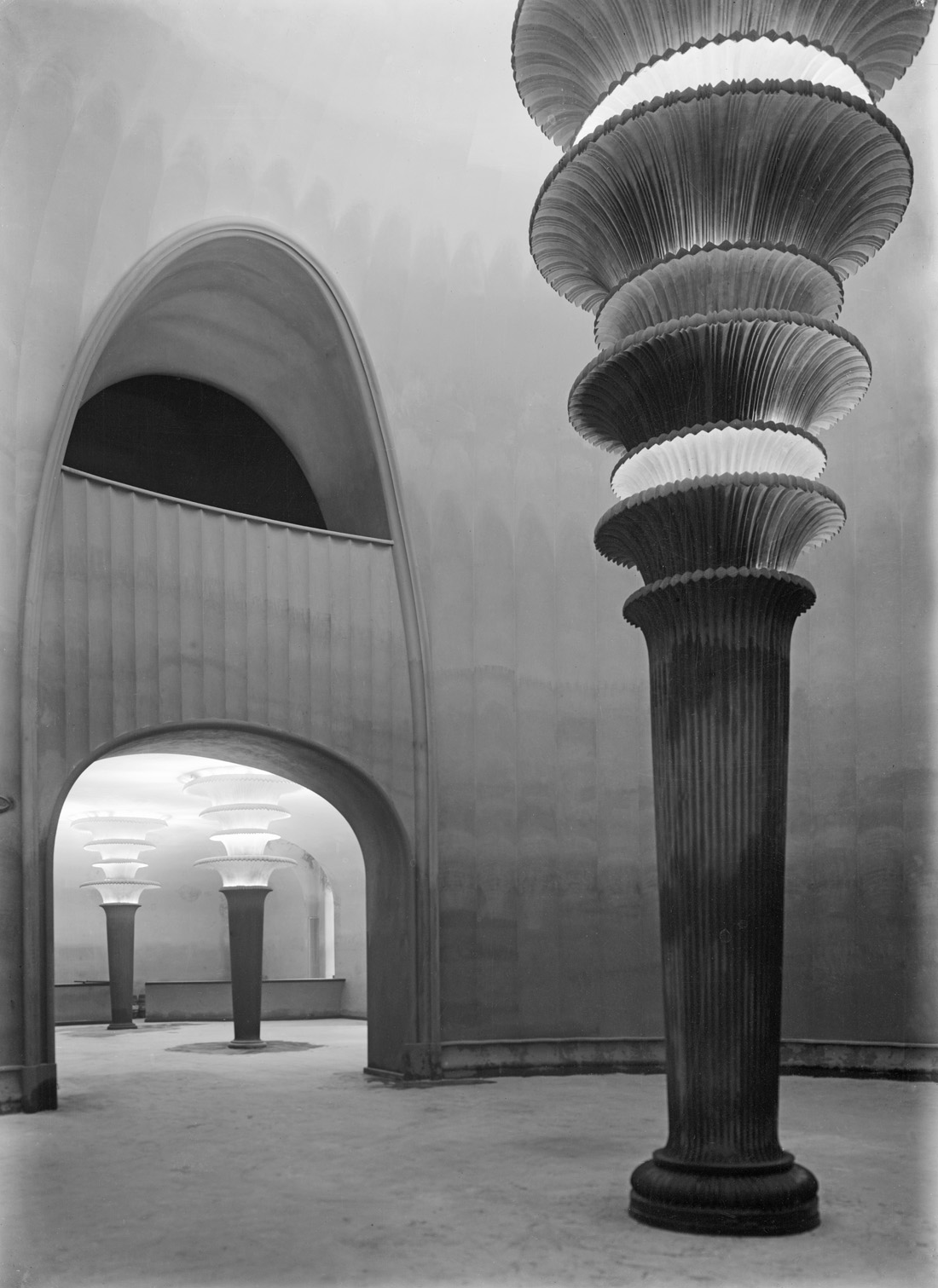
The Foyer's monumental cantilevered light-columns c. 1920

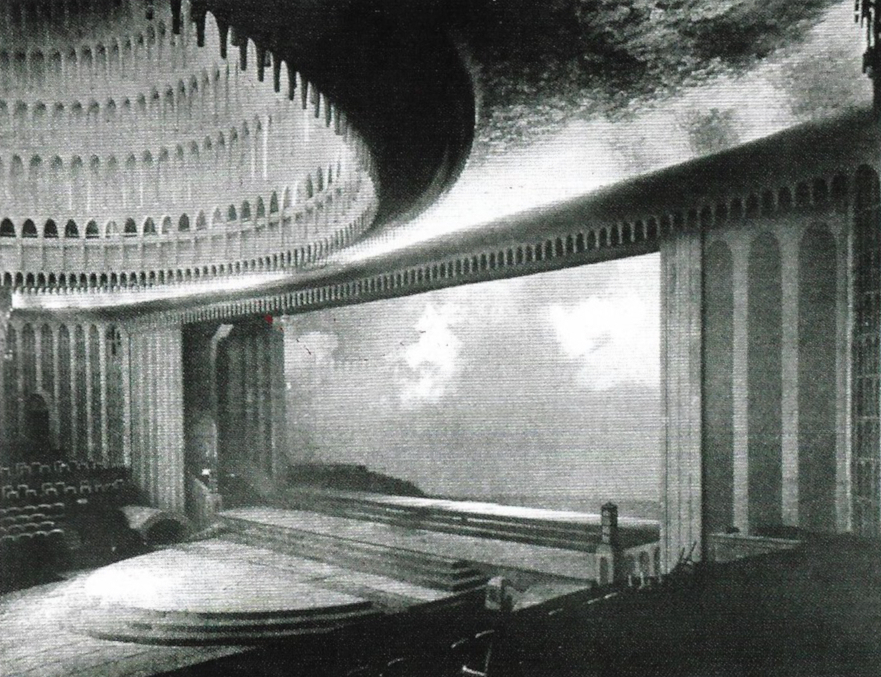
The theatre's massive stage, c. 1920

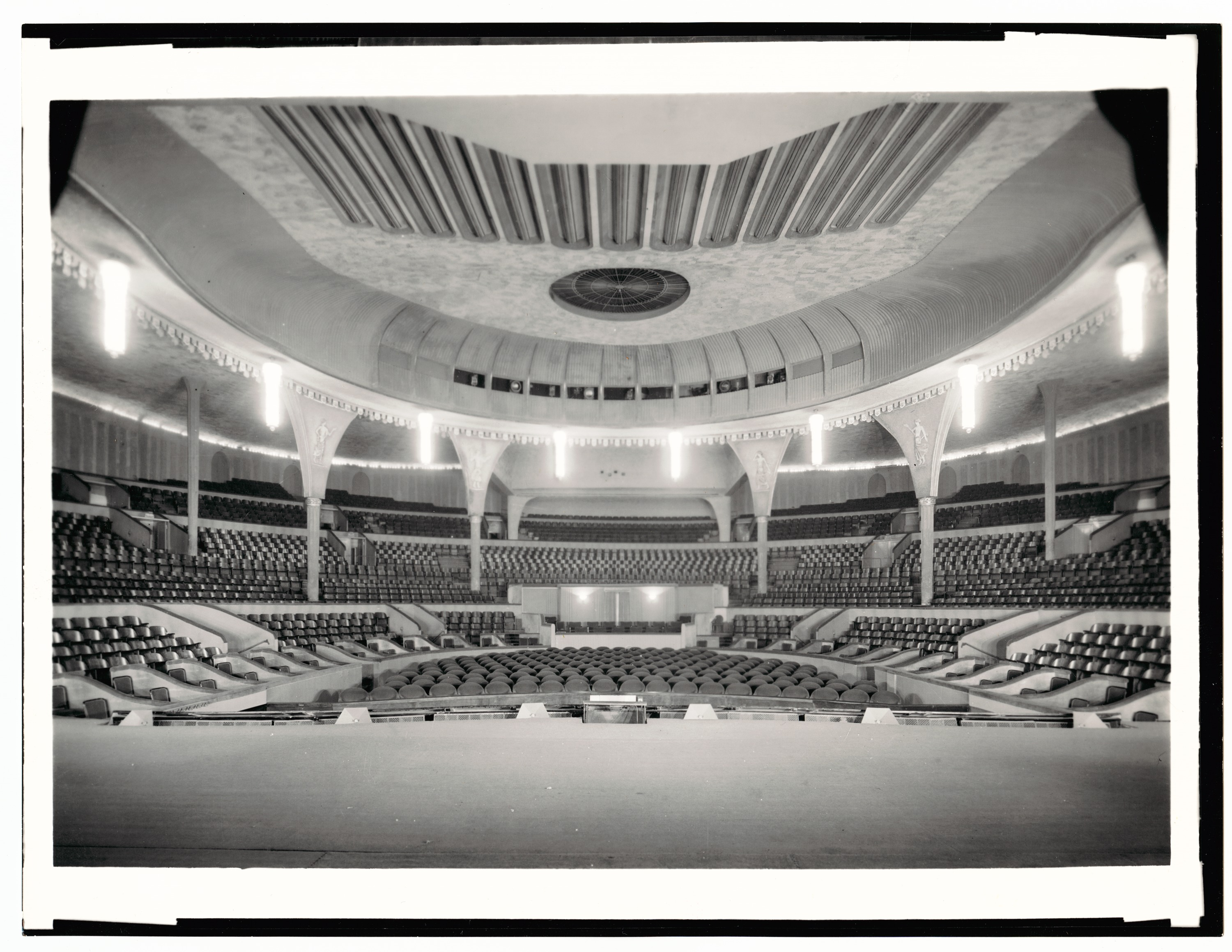
Interior after the Labour Front renovation, c. 1941

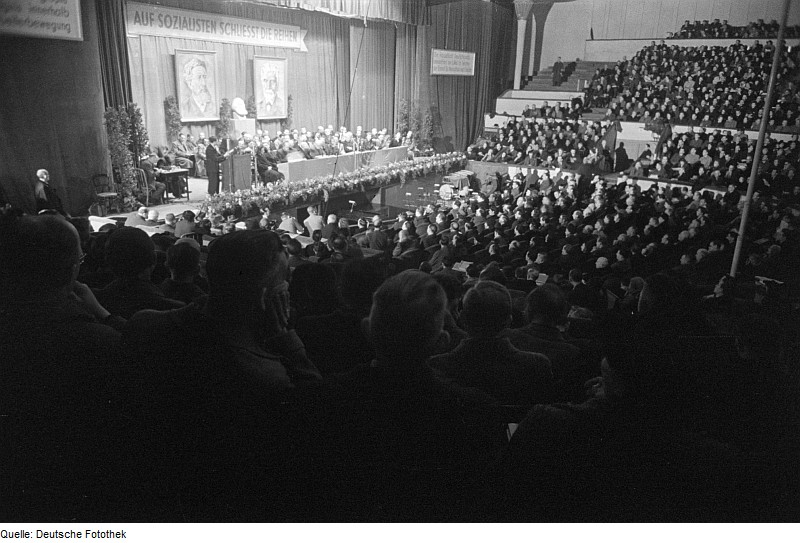
Vote on the merger of the SPD and KPD in the theatre, during official party talks at the Admiralspalast, 21 April 1946

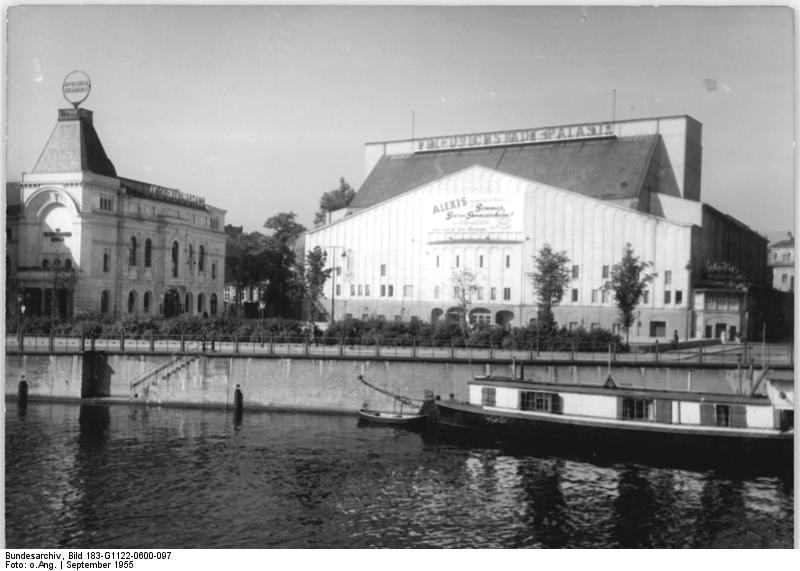
The theatre's position relative to the Theater am Schiffbauerdamm, c. 1964

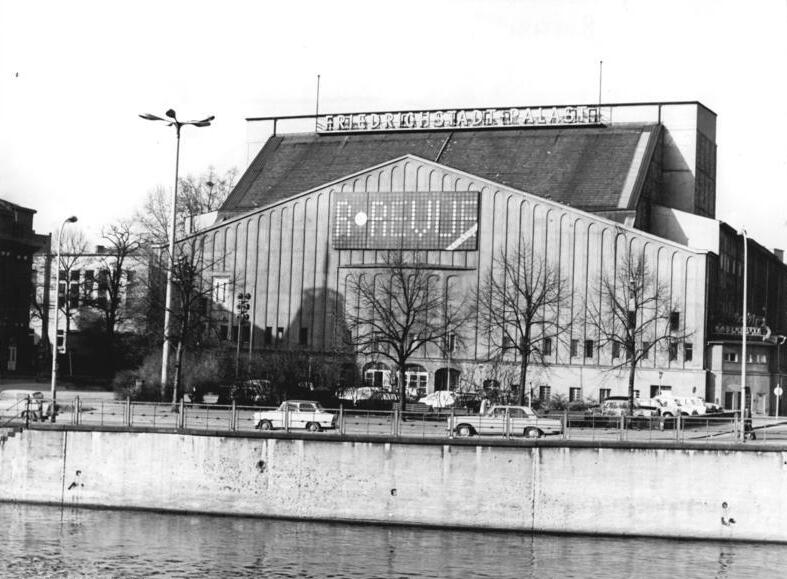
The theatre as the (first) Friedrichstadt-Palast in 1972
