= Circus Renz (disambiguation) =

Circus Renz was a German circus company, the name of which may also refer to:

- Circus Herman Renz, a Dutch circus company
- Circus Renz (1927 film), directed by Wolfgang Neff
- Circus Renz (1943 film), directed by Arthur Maria Rabenalt
