= Hanstein =

Hanstein may refer to:

== People ==
- Alexander von Hanstein, Count of Pölzig and Beiersdorf (1804–1884), Thuringian count
- Fritz Huschke von Hanstein (1911–1996), German race driver and Porsche's public relations manager
- Georg Fredrik Wilhelm Hanstein (1820–1862), Norwegian architect
- Johannes von Hanstein (1822–1880), German botanist who was a native of Potsdam
- John Hanstein or Adolf Zytogorski (c. 1811/1812–1882), Polish-British chess player and translator
- Ludwig Hanstein (1892–1918), German World War I flying ace
- Wilhelm Hanstein (1811–1850), German chess player and writer

== Places ==
- Hanstein Castle, ruined castle in the middle of Germany in the Eichsfeld, above the river Werra, in Thuringia
- Hanstein-Rusteberg, collective municipality in the district Eichsfeld, in Thuringia, Germany
