= Circus Renz (1927 film) =

1927 film

- German: Zirkus Renz
- Directed by: Wolfgang Neff
- Written by: Margarete-Maria Langen
- Starring: Angelo Ferrari; Mary Kid; Ernst Winar
- Cinematography: Julius Balting
- Music by: Felix Bartsch
- Production company: Albö-Film
- Distributed by: Albö-Film
- Release date: March 1927
- Running time: 99 minutes
- Country: Germany
- Languages: Silent; German intertitles

Circus Renz (German: Zirkus Renz) is a 1927 German silent adventure film directed by Wolfgang Neff and starring Angelo Ferrari, Mary Kid, and Ernst Winar.

The film's sets were designed by the art director Willi Herrmann.

== Cast ==
- Angelo Ferrari
- Mary Kid
- Ernst Winar

== See also ==
- Circus Renz (1943 film)
- Circus Renz, German circus company
