= Friedrichstadt-Palast =

Revue theatre in Berlin

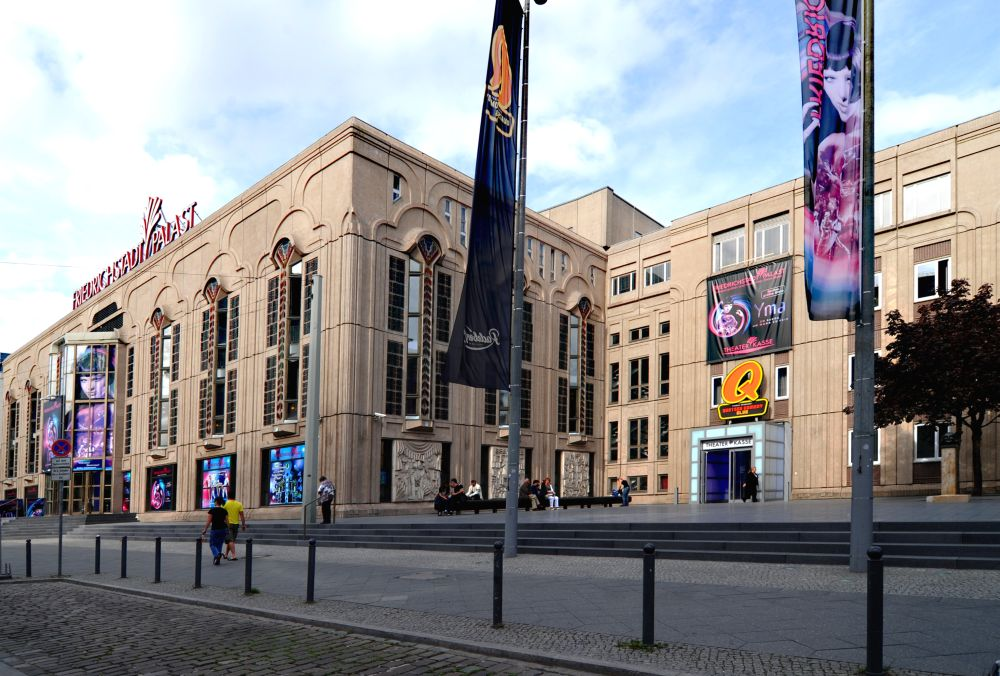
- The theatre in 2011
- Interactive map of Friedrichstadt-Palast
- Address: Friedrichstraße 107, 10117 Berlin; Berlin; Germany
- Coordinates: 52°31′26″N 13°23′20″E
- Owner: City of Berlin
- Capacity: 1,895
- Type: Theatre
- Current use: Theatre

Construction
- Opened: 1919

Website
- www.palast.berlin

The Friedrichstadt-Palast, also shortened to Palast Berlin, is a revue theatre in the Berlin district of Mitte at Friedrichstraße. The term Friedrichstadt-Palast refers both to the building as well as the institution and its ensemble. The present building is distinct from its predecessor, the Old Friedrichstadt-Palast (former Grosses Schauspielhaus), which was located near Schiffbauerdamm and demolished in 1985. To distinguish it from its aforementioned predecessor, the building is also commonly known as Neuer Friedrichstadt-Palast (New Friedrichstadt-Palast).

== History ==
=== Beginnings ===
The history of the Friedrichstadt-Palast goes back to an earlier market hall, which is about 200 meters southwest of present-day location between the Bertolt-Brecht-Platz and the road was at the circus, official address was in 1867 at the 1st Circus.

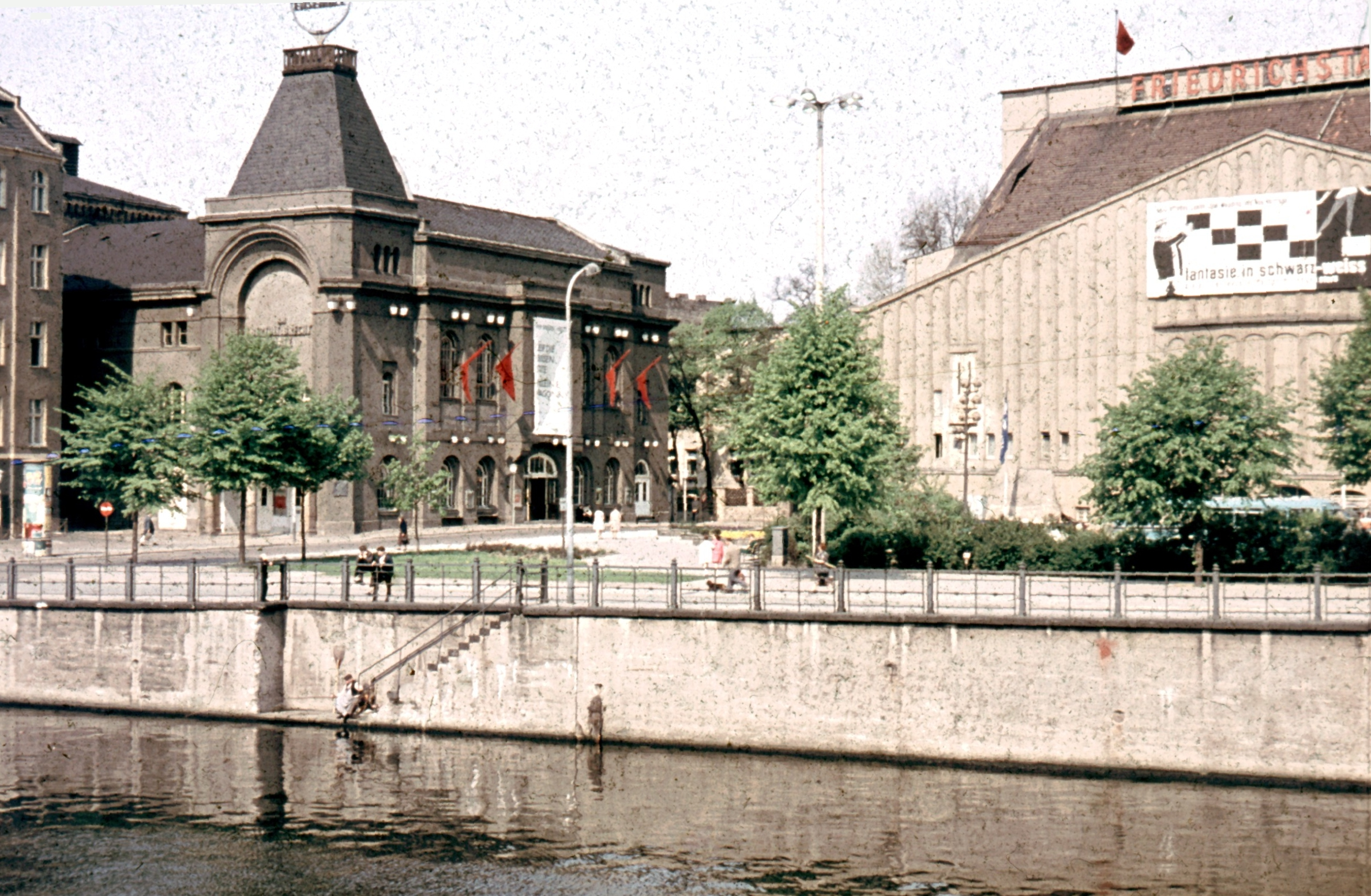
View of the old Friedrichstadt-Palast (right), next to the river Spree, ca 1964.

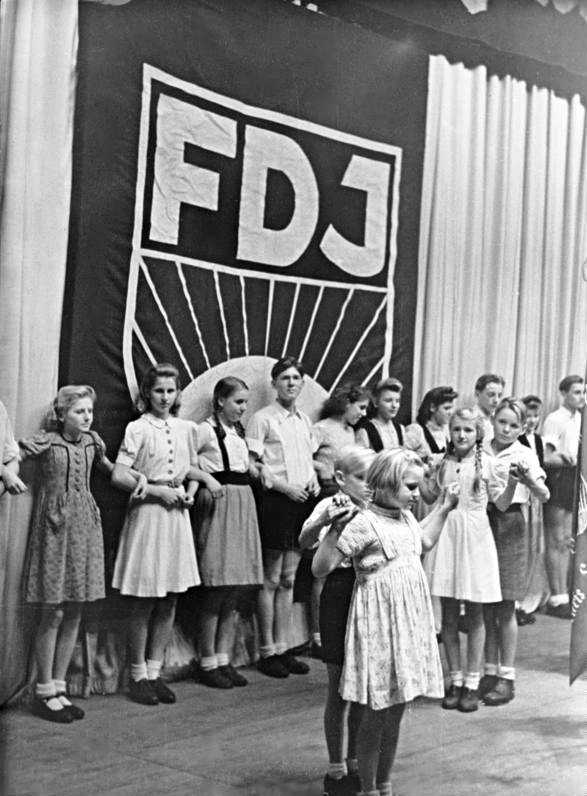
Inauguration ceremony of the FDJ ("Freie Deutsche Jugend", the GDR's official youth movement) at Alter Friedrichstadt-Palast in 1947.

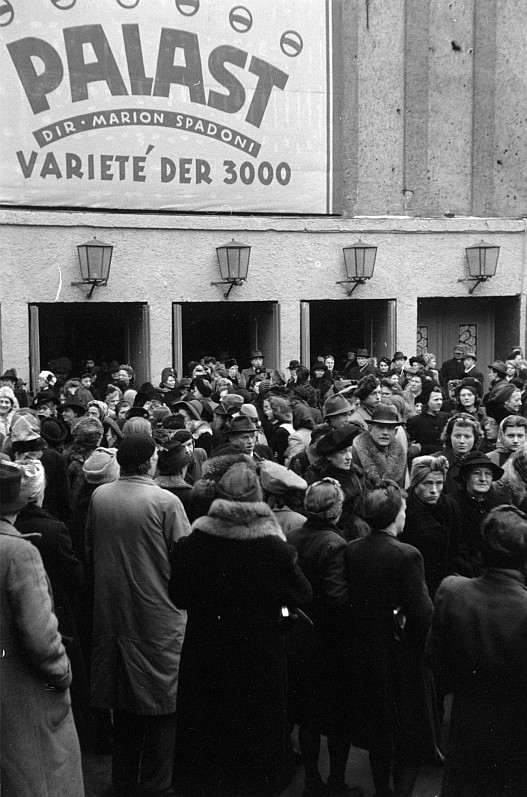
Closing speech at the German Women's Congress for Peace in March 1947.

The building was built from 1865 to 1867 on behalf of the Berlin real estate stock company under the plans of the Privy building advice of Friedrich Hitzig. This was under the direction of the architect who built Lent and on 29 September 1867, Berlin's first market hall was opened. The building was 84 meters long and 64 meters wide. Just seven months after its opening, 18 April 1868, for economic reasons, which arose from the bad traffic situation at that time, it closed. The building was empty at first and was later used as a food depot. During the German-Prussian War of 1870–71 the Prussian Army command sent in the construction of a replenishment arsenal. After the war the hall was again unused.

=== First building ===
In 1873, the building was converted into a 5,000 seat circus arena. On 25 December 1873 it was opened as a covered market by Circus Director Albert Salamonsky. The ideas offered above all included training horses, for Salamonsky was supportive of riders. On 20 April 1879, the building was acquired by Ernst Renz and let Circus Renz continue its operation. Renz had the building rebuilt in 1888. Over the subsequent admission capacity, figures from various sources differ, yet it possibly hold up to 8000 seats. Renz made use of its closeness to water to its advantage by the fact that the building sat on 863 piles over the course of a swamp by the suburb of Oranienburg. The nearby river, already used in the days of the market hall to keep fish, flowers and vegetables fresh, was now openly led through the building. According to Renz's obituary in 1892, the enterprise was continued by his son Franz Renz, but it closed in July 1897 under the great pressure of competition.

The building was auctioned and came into the possession of Bolossy Kiralfy and Hermann Haller. They directed the rebuilding again of the nightclub New Olympic giant theater or giant Olympia Theatre. The proscenium arch was widened to 44 meters and four of the eight major pillars in the auditorium were removed. However, after two years, the duo Kiralfy/Haller gave up again, their ostentatious shows with too little content finding little favour with audiences.

In October 1899, the circus reopened. Schumann decided on classic circus programs featuring numerous dressage horses. Another renovation in 1901 led to the enlargement of the stage area to 800 square meters and a modernization of the installed technology. From 1910, Berlin audiences preferred programs with trained predator animals, and interest in Schumann's performances waned. The first World War finally brought him to ruin. At the beginning of the war, his horses were requisitioned for the Imperial Cavalry, and earnings went to paying taxes. On 31 March 1918 the Circus Schumann held its last performance.

=== New ownership ===
Ringmasters Salomonsky, Renz, Schumann and the artistes Kiralfy/Haller followed Max Reinhardt, and wanted to use his monumental circus for the staging of classic plays. April 1918 had the takeover of the National-Theater AG's house on behalf of Reinhardt. Reinhardt decided to rebuild the building for the new use for it was rebuilt again by the renowned architect Hans Poelzig. After this, the market hall had been transformed, with cast-iron columns and struts through a stucco ceiling with dangling teardrop pin architecture. The building had a revolving stage of 18 meters in diameter and had movable proscenium. Added to this was modern lighting and effects technology.

In November 1919, the now large theater building called The Oresteia by Aeschylus in the processing and translation of Karl Gustav Vollmoeller directed by Max Reinhardt solemnly opened.

1924 had the staged Erik Charell with his Charellrevue with lyrics by Robert Gilbert, and the music show The White Horse Inn. July 1925 brought Erwin Piscator's Political Review Still, on stage.

=== World War and new beginnings ===
During the Nazi era, the theater was renamed Theater des Volkes. The dome hanging pins were cut off as they were seen as degenerate art. Now late-bourgeois operettas were performed. The theatre was at this time also under the name Palace of 5000 and under the private management of Spadonis Marion and Nicola Lupo.

The building suffered most in March 1945 due to repeated air attacks. Damage caused the plays to be removed from March until August 1945. Spadoni and Lupo ran the Building as the Palace of the 3000/Theater of 3000 or Palace at the Friedrichstrasse station and Palace Variety.

In 1949, the owners abandoned the theater and the city of Berlin took over the facility; the original name Friedrichstadtpalast returned. The first director following the expropriation of Gottfried Hermann was Wolfgang E. Struck in 1961.

=== Closure ===
On 29 February 1980, the building was immediately closed after the inspection by construction experts. The reason was a strong subsidence of the foundation as well as the moulding of the supporting piles. In an ADN -message the same day it said: "No performances will be offered in March. The City Council of Berlin has, in the interest of public safety, been forced to close down the facilities. The constant monitoring of the palace by the state supervision as well as several special investigations have revealed a deterioration of the foundation construction." Thus passed that evening the last performance. Although closed as a venue, the main house of the ensemble was subsequently used as a rehearsal stage. Even the magazine, the workshops and administrative buildings continued to be utilised. After the ensemble moved to the new building in 1985, demolition of the almost 120-year-old building began almost immediately.

In the old and new Friedrichstadt-Palast, television shows were regularly filmed of the Deutscher Fernsehfunk television production, featuring a number of international stars. Some parts of the Saturday evening show Ein Kessel Buntes were filmed here.

== Present day ==
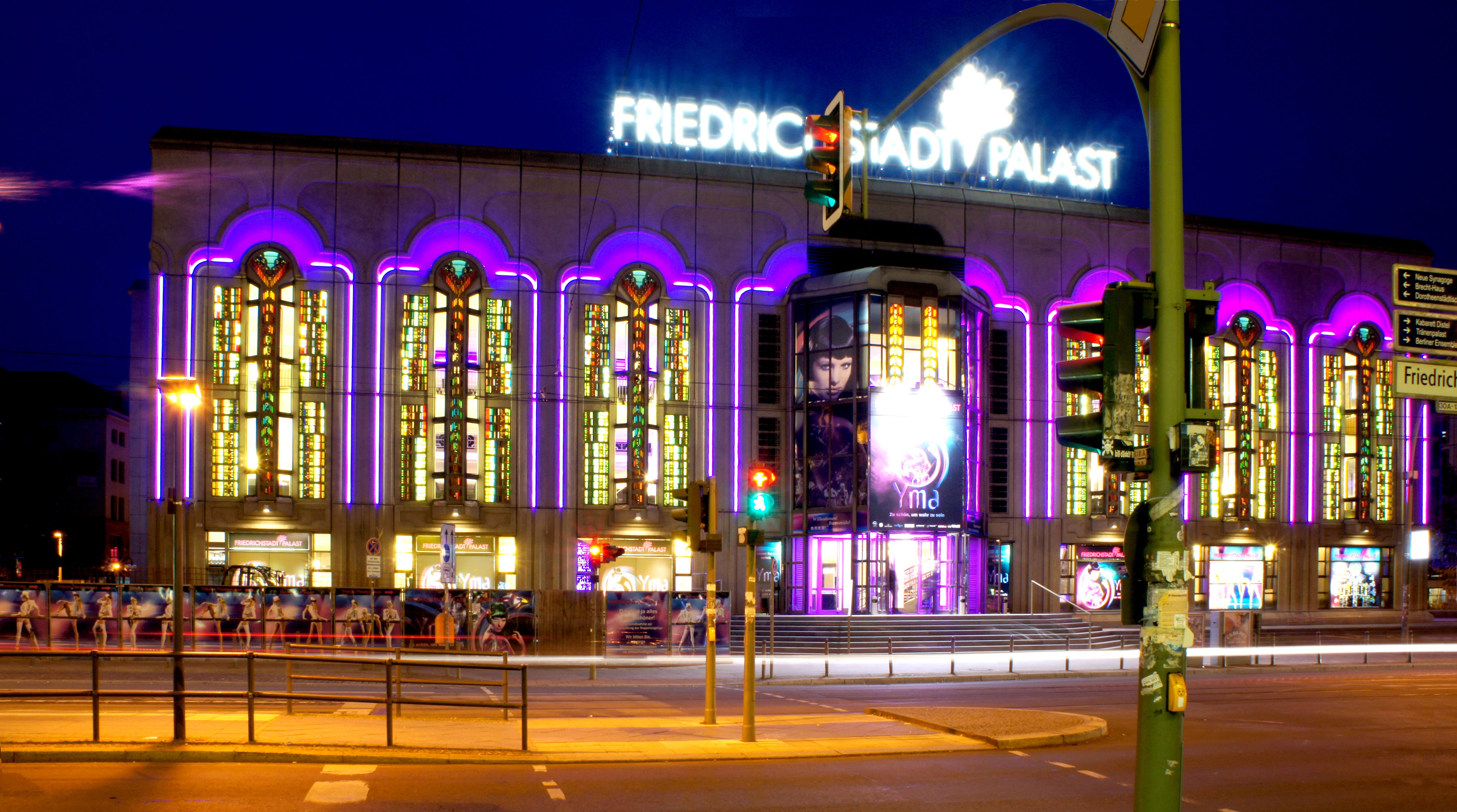
Modern Friedrichstadt-Palast at night

=== Building ===
Today, the Friedrichstadt-Palast is the largest and most modern show palace in Europe. On 27 April 1984, the new Friedrichstadt-Palast opened. It measures 80 meters (260 ft) wide, 110 meters (360 ft) long and covers a floor area of 195,000 cubic meters (255,000 cu yd). Its concrete architecture retains basic ideas of the old interior vestibule, but has a new contemporary façade. The three reliefs on the south side and one on the north side of the building are works by sculptor Emilia N. Bayer. They relate back to the history of the Palace as a circus, theater and vaudeville theater.

The Friedrichstadt-Palast's large hall is regularly used as a performing space, and has a seating capacity 1,895. Its stage floor of 2,854 square meters (30,720 sq ft) is the largest in the world. The 24-meter (79 ft) wide proscenium arch is the widest in Europe.

=== Management ===
- 1995: The theater converted to a GmbH company.
- 1995 – 2004: Alexander Iljinskij became the first artistic director.
- 2004 – October 2007: Thomas Münstermann and Guido Herrmann became the directors.
- November 2007 – present: Dr. Berndt Schmidt became the director and sole manager.

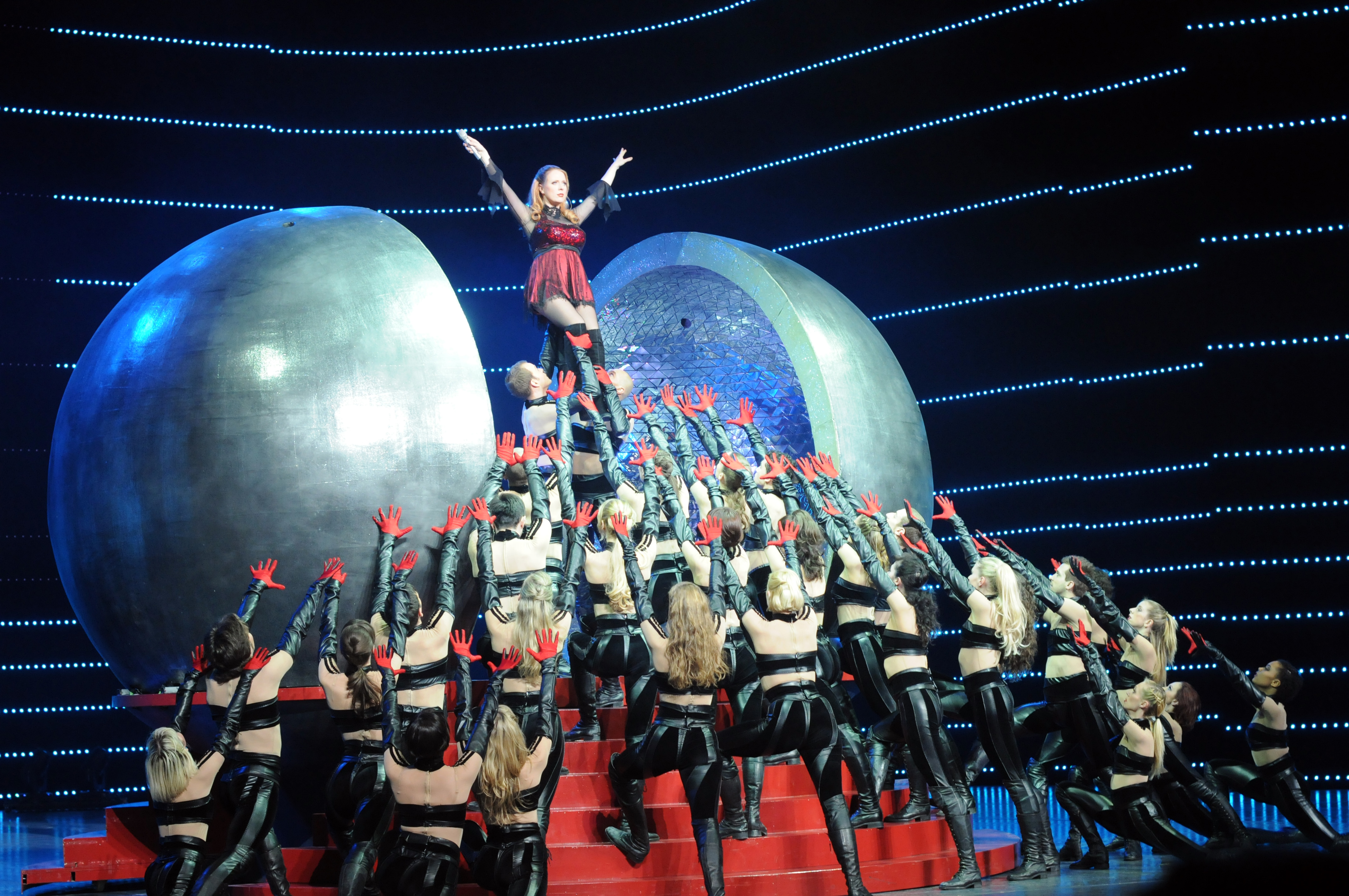
Revue show "Qi" at Friedrichstadt-Palast

=== Performances ===
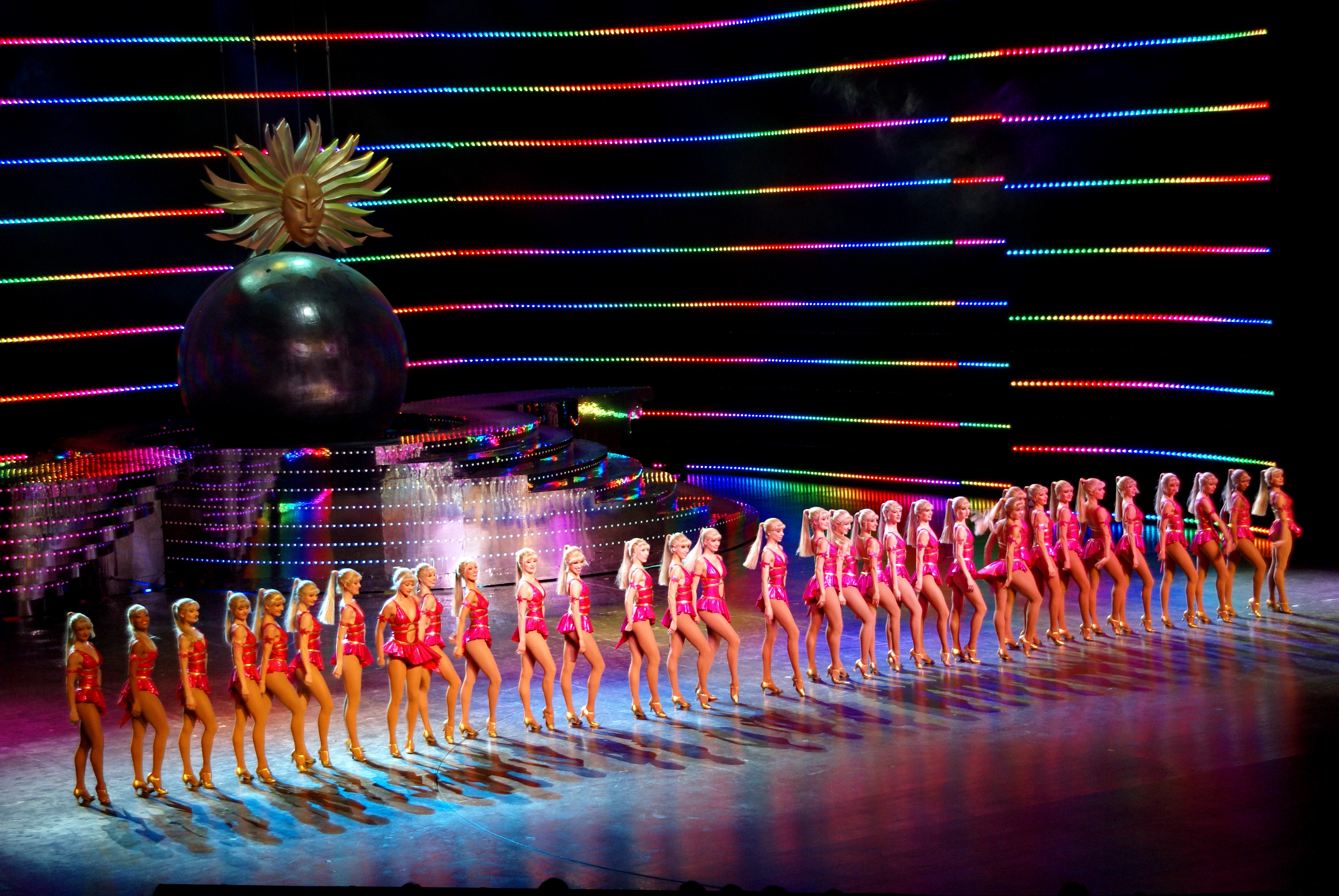
A dance show at Friedrichstadt-Palast

Friedrichstadt-Palast has diverse programing, ranging from children's shows, guest performances, and festival galas. The venue specializes in complex shows that use advanced lighting and stage technology, over a hundred performers, and stylized acrobatic numbers. "Now we are modern – trying to compete with Las Vegas, but not in a western or American way," said Berndt Schmidt. In residence, the Friedrichstadt-Palast has a Ballet Company, a show-band, and a Youth Ensemble. The shows are suitable for an international audience.

The Ballet Company, directed by Alexandra Georgieva, includes 60 dancers from 26 countries worldwide. The ensemble blends different styles of dance, including jazz, modern, hip-hop and street-dance.

The show band of the Friedrichstadt-Palast, directed by Daniel Behrens, includes 16 musicians.

The Children and Youth Ensemble, "Children play for children," has 250 Berlin children ranging from ages 6–16. The beginnings of the ensemble dates back to 1947 when 250 Berlin children trained there. Currently it receives 1,000 applicants, and 20–30 children can be accepted. Former members of the ensemble have been Paula Beer (won Best Young Actress Award from the Bavarian Film Award), Alina Levshin (won Best Actress for "Warrior" from the German Cinema Film Award), and Julia Richter (winner of the Hersfeld-Preis in 1996).

Since 2009, the venue has been used for the Berlin International Film Festival.

The Quatsch Comedy Club is located in the basement of Friedrichstadt-Palast. The club's founder Thomas Hermanns launched the popularity of stand-up comedy in Berlin in the early nineties. From Thursday to Sunday, German stand-up comedians perform at the "Club Mix". Guests have included Bernhard Hoëcker, Olaf Schubert, Dave Davis and Cloozy Haber.
