= Alexander von Hanstein, Count of Pölzig and Beiersdorf =

German nobleman

Alexander von Hanstein
- Count of Pölzig and Beiersdorf
- Born: 9 June 1804; Kulmbach
- Died: 18 April 1884 (aged 79); Schmölln
- Spouse(s): Princess Louise of Saxe-Gotha-Altenburg (m. 1826; died 1831) Marie Therese von Carlowitz (m. 1833; died 1845)
- Issue: Maximilan von Hanstein; Clara von Hanstein; Thekla von Hanstein
- Father: Friedrich von Hanstein
- Mother: Anna Maria von Hanstein

Maximilian Elisäus Alexander von Hanstein, Count of Pölzig and Beiersdorf (9 June 1804, Burghaig, Kulmbach – 18 April 1884, Schmölln) was a Thuringian count. He was the stepfather of Albert, Prince Consort, and grandfather of Hans Poelzig.

== Life ==
Alexander von Hanstein came from the Thüringer noble family of Hanstein Castle and was the son of Baron Friedrich von Hanstein and his wife, Anna Maria (née Hausmann).

In 1824, Alexander was equerry (Stallmeister) for Ernest III, Duke of Saxe-Coburg-Saalfeld. The duke's marriage was rocky; his first wife, Princess Louise of Saxe-Gotha-Altenburg, had an affair with von Hanstein, and Louise was exiled from the dukedom in the autumn of 1824. She was assigned a residence in the Principality of Lichtenberg, now in Saarland, and Alexander followed her there.

On the death of Frederick IV, Duke of Saxe-Gotha-Altenburg, on 11 February 1825, Louise became sole heiress of the House of Saxe-Gotha-Altenburg. In the subsequent discussions over the inheritance, a separation agreement was hammered out and the Saxon duchies were re-organised. Ernest separated from Louise on 31 March 1826, and in the same year exchanged Saalfeld for Gotha.

Now free, Louise planned to marry von Hanstein, and in preparation for such a marriage Alexander was created Count of Pölzig and Beiersdorf on 19 July 1826 by Louise’s uncle Frederick, Duke of Saxe-Altenburg. On 18 October 1826, Alexander and Louise married at St. Wendel, the capital of the small principality of Lichtenberg. They resided in the castle there and spent some happy years; but the marriage remained childless and Louise was prohibited by her first husband from contacting her children in Coburg.

After Louise's early death from cancer in 1831, Alexander went into the Prussian service and commanded the regiment of the corps Cürrassier in Potsdam. He married the 21-year-old Marie Therese von Carlowitz (1812-1845) on 18 April 1833 in Coburg. As Count and Countess of Pölzig, they lived at Schloss Pölzig and had three children:

- Maximilan Anton (18 February 1834 – between 1865 and 1871)
- Clara Henriette Marie (3 April 1835 – 25 April 1879)
- Thekla Marie Agnes (29 November 1841 – 4 April 1903)

In 1845, Alexander approached his stepson Prince Albert, who in the meantime had married Queen Victoria, and Albert allowed him a pension.

His second daughter, Clara, married the British shipowner George Acland Ames on 13 July 1854. Their sixth child, Hans, was born on 30 April 1869 in Berlin. Because Ames did not acknowledge Hans as his son, he was given the surname Poelzig. Clara and Ames separated in July 1869, and Clara returned to Pölzig. She lived as a "the young countess" in the Schloss and died 10 years later in Beiersdorf. Hans Poelzig grew up in Berlin and became a world-famous architect and set designer.

Alexander's grandchildren, the Ames family in England, inherited the schloss on his death in 1884.
