= Emilia Bayer =

Bulgarian sculptor, painter

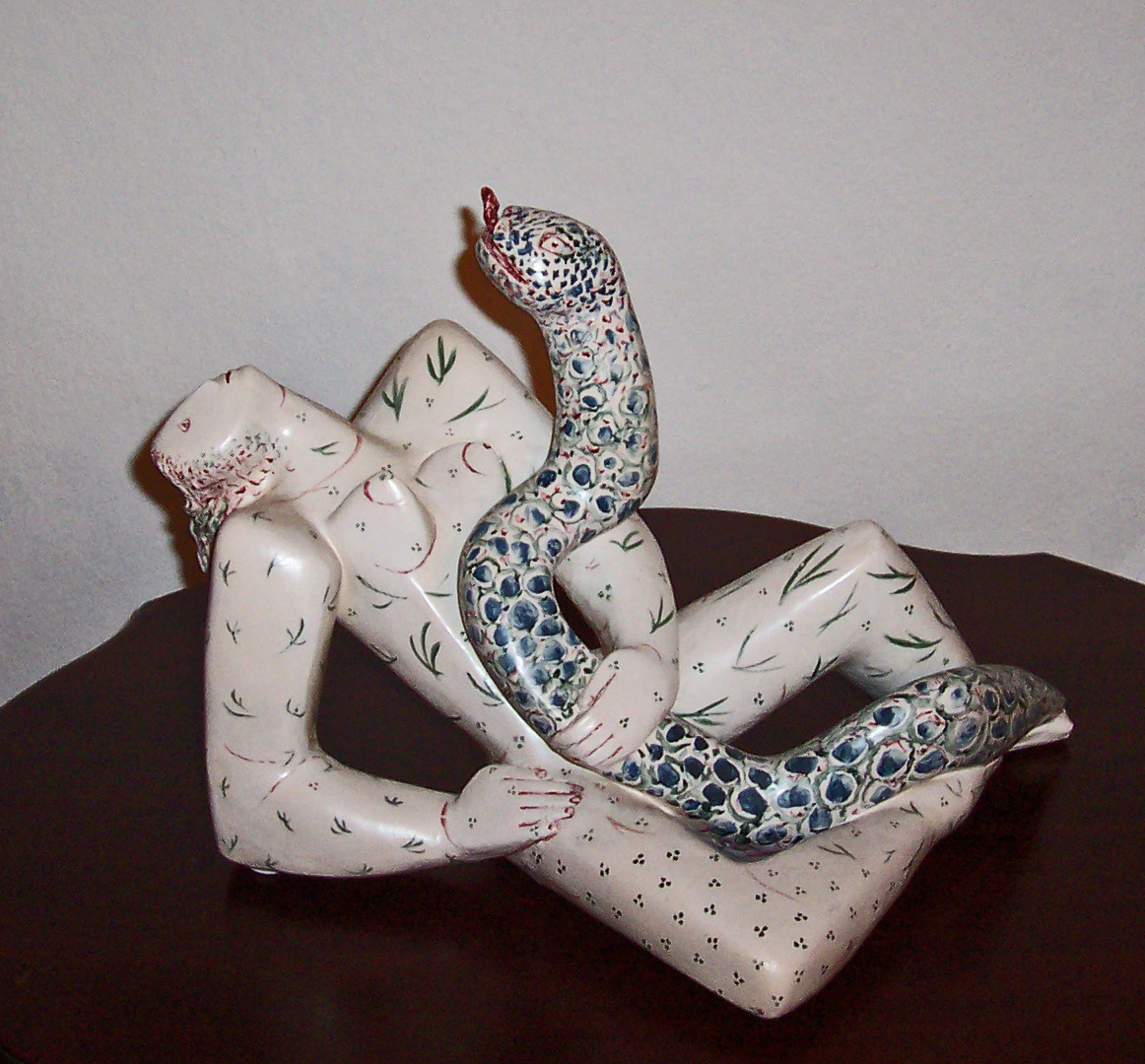
Woman with snake, Maiolica, 2003

Emilia Nicolova Bayer was born May 5, 1934, in Sofia, Bulgaria. She studied sculpture and ceramics at the Akademy of Arts in Sofia. Since finishing her studies at the Akademy in 1964 she has worked as a freelance sculptor. She has also taken commissions for works in applied graphics, book design and calligraphic design.

== Career ==
During 1973–1975 Bayer designed work in Bulgaria including 250m² stone reliefs for the new building of the Theatre Sofia in Sofia. The subject was the development of acting in the history of mankind. This work of art is thought to be an exceptionally well turned out synthesis of architecture and sculpture.

In 1975 Bayer moved to Berlin. In the following decade she took commissions for more than ten larger-than-life sculptures in public parks and buildings. Her main work in Berlin was the commission to design reliefs for the new building of the Friedrichstadt-Palast theatre, (1982–1984). Of the originally planned 12 reliefs only six were realised, but at last only four came true. Afterwards due to the dissident actions of her husband she could not get other commissions; even contracts already given were foreclosed. She could no longer show her works at exhibitions.

When the new politics of the communist administration became clear, the Bayer family applied for emigration visas, which were eventually granted after more than four years of fighting the bureaucracy. These four years of a de facto ban to exhibit and publish any of her works caused an irredeemable break in Bayer's specialty – applied sculpture on buildings. Today she concentrates on the realms of figurative porcelain, oil-pastels and oil paintings.

== Important works ==
- Reliefs on the Friedrichstadt-Palace done in reinforced concrete unique in Europe in regard to depth and detail
- 250m² stone reliefs at the Sofia theatre in Sofia, Bulgaria
- Two stone reliefs at the theatre in Vidin
- Two fire-baked reliefs terra cotta (ca. 87m² and 20m²) at a public building in Vraza
- Several larger-than life sculptures in Hanover, Berlin, and different towns in Germany and Bulgaria.

Her works are on display in New York, Boston, Seattle, Paris, Hanover, Berlin, Leipzig, Wiesbaden, Munich, Moscow, Warsaw, Sofia; and in museums and collections in Berlin, Sopot (Poland), Faenza (Italy), and Sofia (National Gallery).

== Distinctions ==
- Distinction for the best work of art at the International Art Exhibition in Vienna 1958.
- Distinction for an excellent piece of art at the International Biennale of Modern Ceramics in Faenza (Italy) 1974.
- Decoration "Cyril and Method" (bronze medal) of the Bulgarian state for her life's work 1984.

== Literature ==
Nikolova-Bayer, Emilia: I Maestri Della Ceramica Moderna 1984/The Masters Of Modern Ceramics 1984; edition Faenza Editrice S.p.A. 1984

Torstrasse 111; Lukas Verlag für Kunst- und Geistesgeschichte 2020 ISBN 978-3-86732-366-6

Kunst am Bau in der DDR (Symposium 2020); Deutscher Kunstverlag 2020 ISBN 978-3-422-98606-0

70 Jahre Kunst am Bau; Deutscher Kunstverlag 2020 ISBN 978-3-422-98617-6
