= Gustav Peter =

Composer of popular music

Gustav Peter (c. 1833 – 1919) was a composer of popular music.

Xylophone-Solo in Souvenir de Cirque Renz

There is little known about the life of Gustav Peter. He is supposed to be Austrian or Hungarian but this is still unsure. Sometimes his name is also given as Gustav Heinrich Peter or Heinrich Gustav Peter.

Gustav Peter is the composer of the widely popular piece of music Memory of Circus Renz that was published in 1894 with the original title Souvenir de Cirque Renz. Its musical form is a Galop and primarily it was written for xylophone, but later adapted to various kinds of instruments. It is one of the best-known examples of circus music.

The work was composed at a time when fast dances such as the Galopp were popular in German light music, the xylophone was being rediscovered as an instrument, and Circus Renz was enjoying great popularity in Berlin. Thus, a number of Gustav Peter's contemporaries composed similar works, most of which, however, have been forgotten today.
