= Hans Poelzig =

German architect

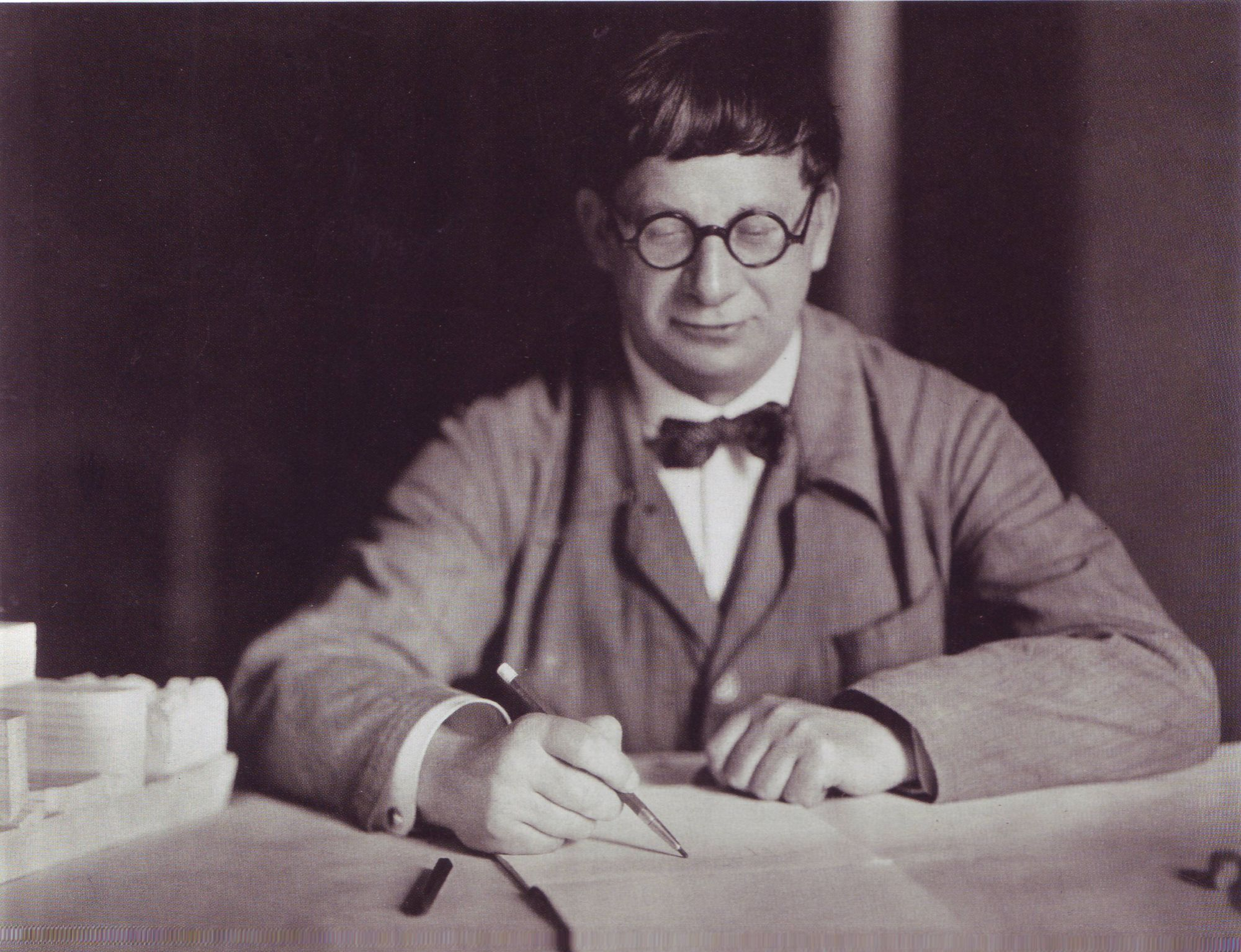
- Hans Poelzig (1927)
- Born: 30 April 1869; Berlin
- Died: 14 June 1936 (aged 67); Berlin
- Occupation: Architect
- Buildings: I.G. Farben Building Großes Schauspielhaus Haus des Rundfunks in Charlottenburg
- Projects: Palace of the Soviets League of Nations Film sets for The Golem

Hans Poelzig (German pronunciation: [ˈhans ˈpœltsɪç]; 30 April 1869 – 14 June 1936) was a German architect, painter and set designer.

== Life ==
Poelzig was born in Berlin in 1869 to Countess Clara Henrietta Maria Poelzig while she was married to George Acland Ames, an Englishman. Uncertain of his paternity, Ames refused to acknowledge Hans as his son and consequently he was brought up by a local choirmaster and his wife. In 1899 he married Maria Voss with whom he had four children.

His mother was the daughter of Alexander von Hanstein, Count of Pölzig and Beiersdorf who married Princess Louise of Saxe-Gotha-Altenburg in 1826. Because of this, Clara was the step-sister to Albert, Prince Consort making Hans a step-cousin to Albert's children.

=== Education ===
In 1903 he became a teacher and director at the Breslau Academy of Art and Design (German: Kunst- und Gewerbeschule Breslau; today in Wrocław, Poland). From 1920–1935 he taught at Technische Hochschule Berlin (today, Technische Universität Berlin).

=== Career ===
After finishing his architectural education around the turn of the century, Poelzig designed many industrial buildings. He designed the 51.2-metre-tall (168 ft) Upper Silesia Tower in Posen (today Poznań) for an industrial fair in 1911. It later became a water tower. He was appointed city architect of Dresden in 1916. He was an influential member of the Deutscher Werkbund.

Poelzig was also known for his distinctive 1919 interior redesign of the Berlin Grosses Schauspielhaus for Weimar impresario Max Reinhardt, and for his vast architectural set designs for the 1920 UFA film production of The Golem: How He Came Into the World. (Poelzig mentored Edgar Ulmer on that film; when Ulmer directed the 1934 film noir Universal Studios production of The Black Cat, he returned the favor by naming the architect-Satanic-high-priest villain character "Hjalmar Poelzig", played by Boris Karloff.)

With his Weimar architect contemporaries like Bruno Taut and Ernst May, Poelzig's work developed through Expressionism and the New Objectivity in the mid-1920s before arriving at a more conventional, economical style. In 1927 he was one of the exhibitors in the first International Style project, the Weissenhof Estate in Stuttgart. In the 1920s he ran the "Studio Poelzig" in partnership with his wife Marlene (Nee Moeschke) (1894–1985). Poelzig also designed the 1929 Broadcasting House in the Berlin suburb of Charlottenburg, a landmark of architecture, and Cold War and engineering history.

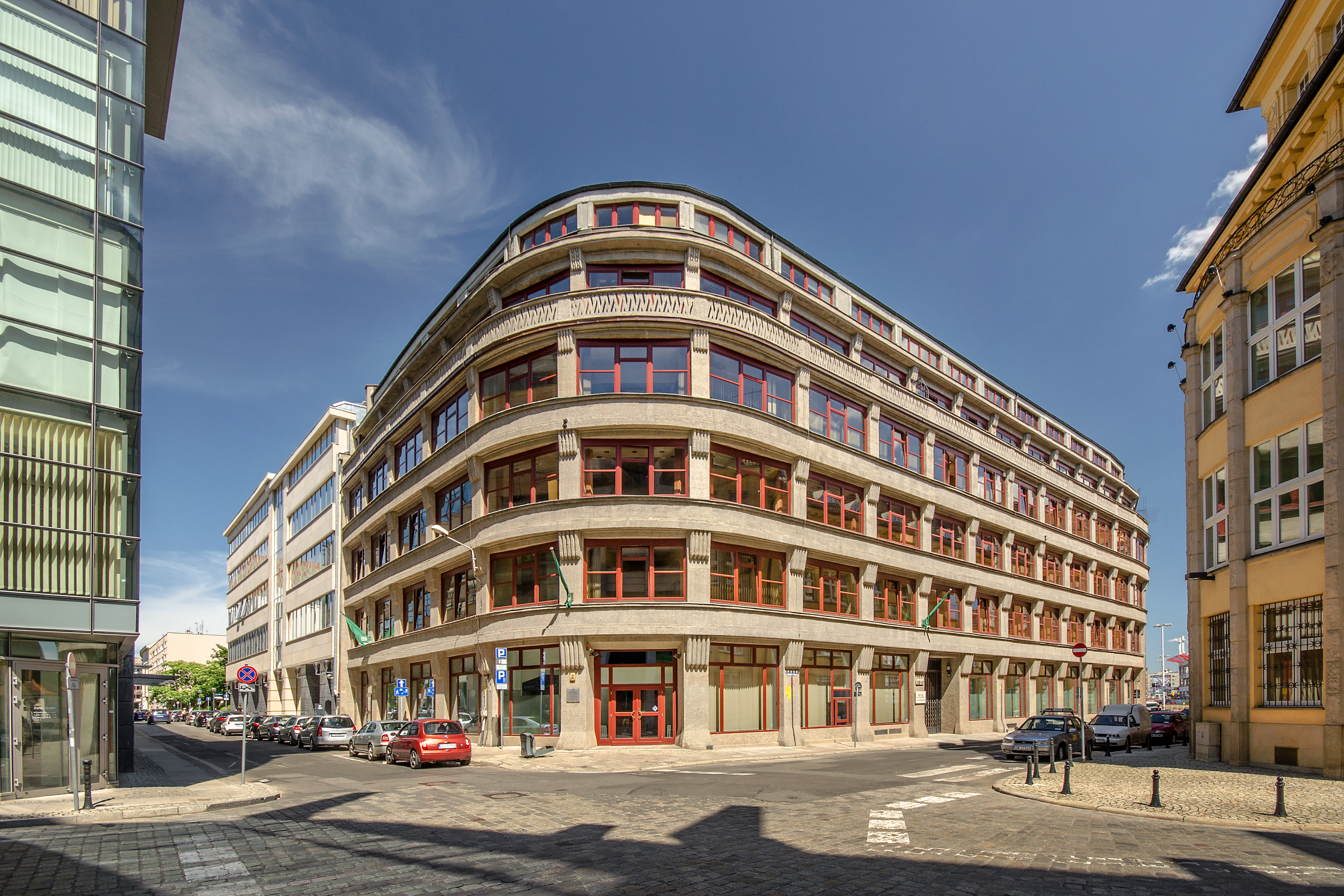
1912 Geschäftshaus Junkernstraße, Wrocław

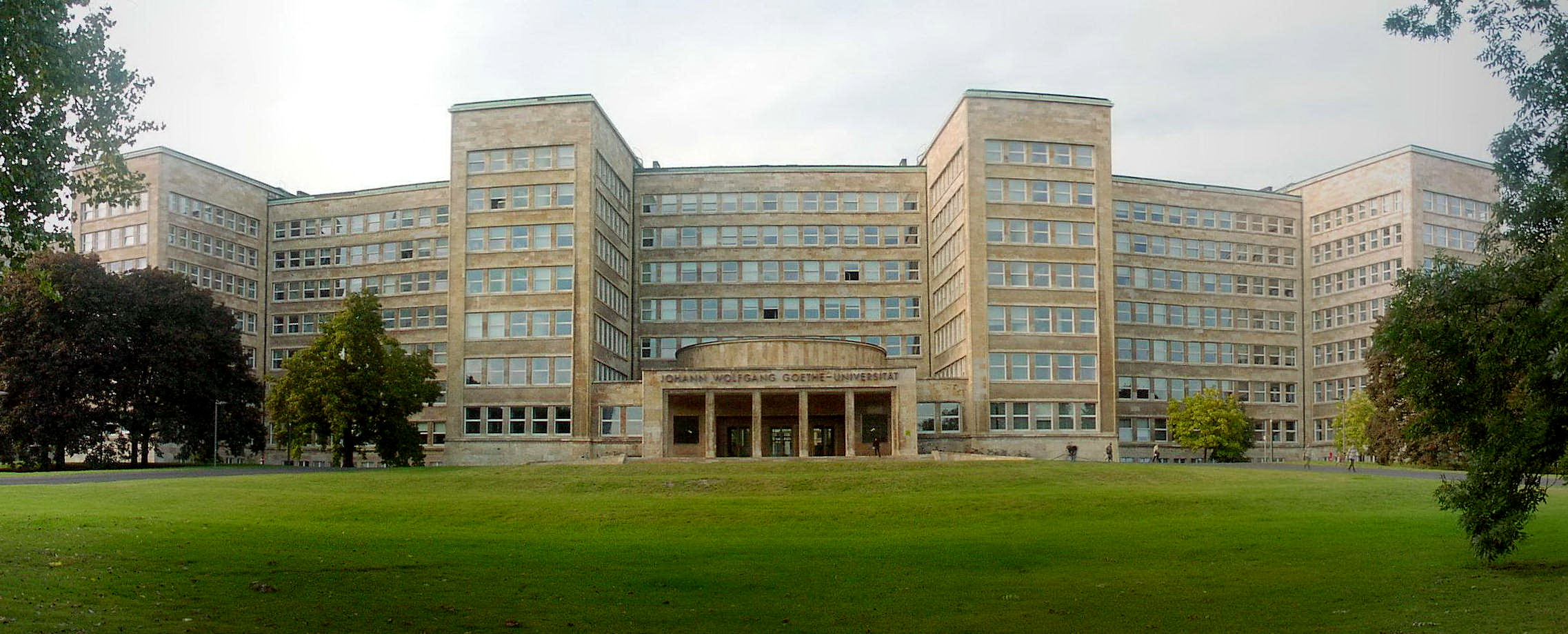
South façade of the 1931 Poelzig Building at Goethe University in Frankfurt

Poelzig's single best-known building is the enormous and legendary I.G. Farben Building, completed in 1931 as the administration building for IG Farben in Frankfurt am Main, now known as the Poelzig Building at Goethe University. In March 1945 the building was occupied by American Allied forces under Eisenhower, became his headquarters, and remained in American hands until 1995. Some of his designs that were never built included one for the Palace of the Soviets and one for the League of Nations headquarters at Geneva.

In 1933 Poelzig served as the interim director of the United State School for Fine and Applied Art (Vereinigte Staatsschulen für freie und angewandete Kunst), after the expulsion of founding director Bruno Paul by the National Socialists.

In 1935 Poelzig received first prize for a theater and concert hall in Istanbul, Turkey, where he was also planning to teach. On November 30 that year, age 65, he retired from the Director of the Architecture Department of the Prussian Academy of Arts in Berlin. While preparing to move to Turkey, on 14 June 1936, Hans Poelzig died of a stroke. He was buried in the Old Wannsee Cemetery.

In 1937 his wife had to close her studio under pressure from the National Socialists.

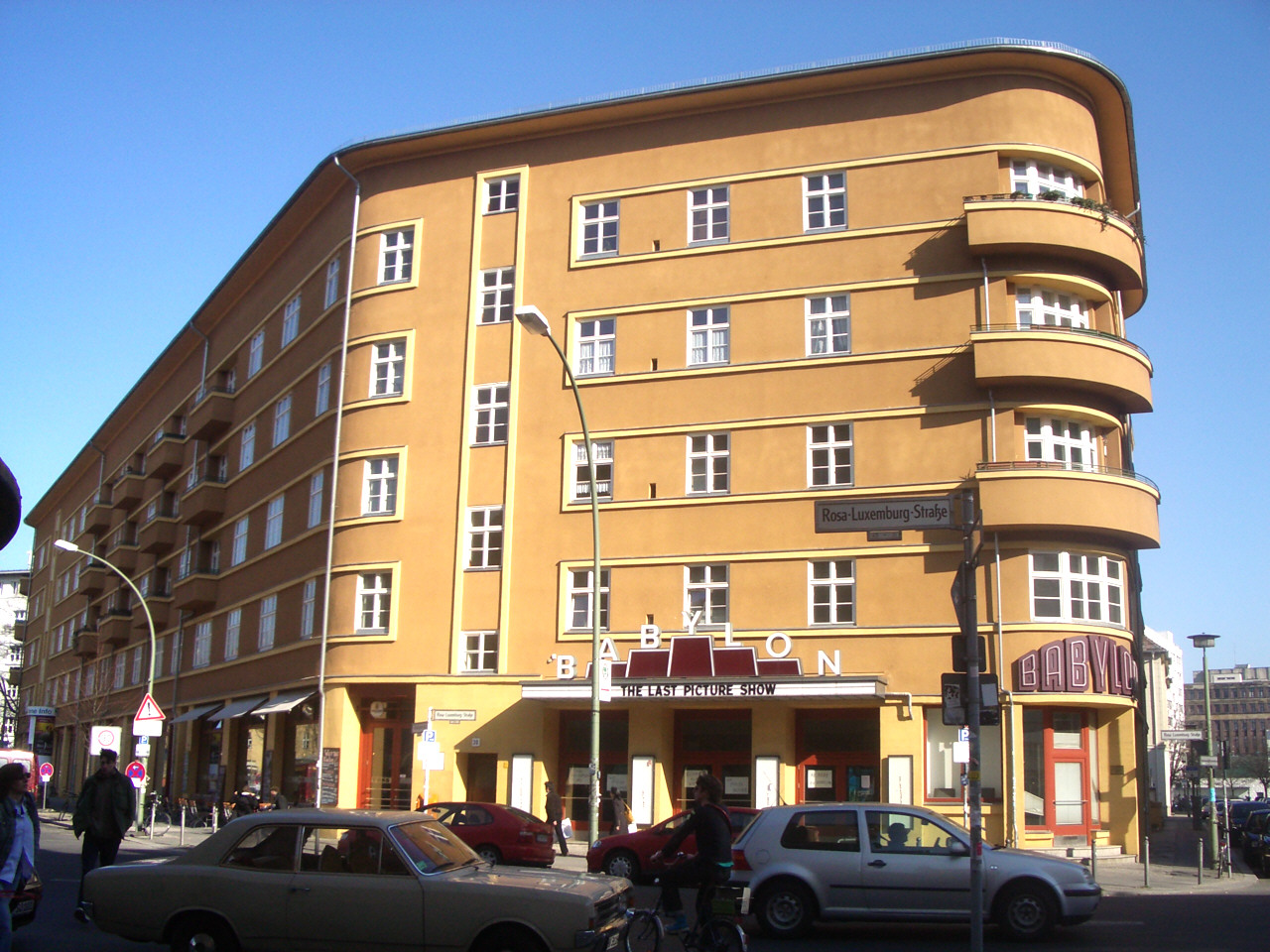
Babylon cinema and apartments in Berlin

== Legacy ==
On 18 November 2015, Friedrichstadt-Palast Berlin inaugurated a memorial at Friedrichstraße 107 dedicated to the theatre's founders, Max Reinhardt, Hans Poelzig and Erik Charell.

The interior of the castle of the Wizard of Oz in the 2024 film Wicked was inspired by the Großes Schauspielhaus.

== Work ==
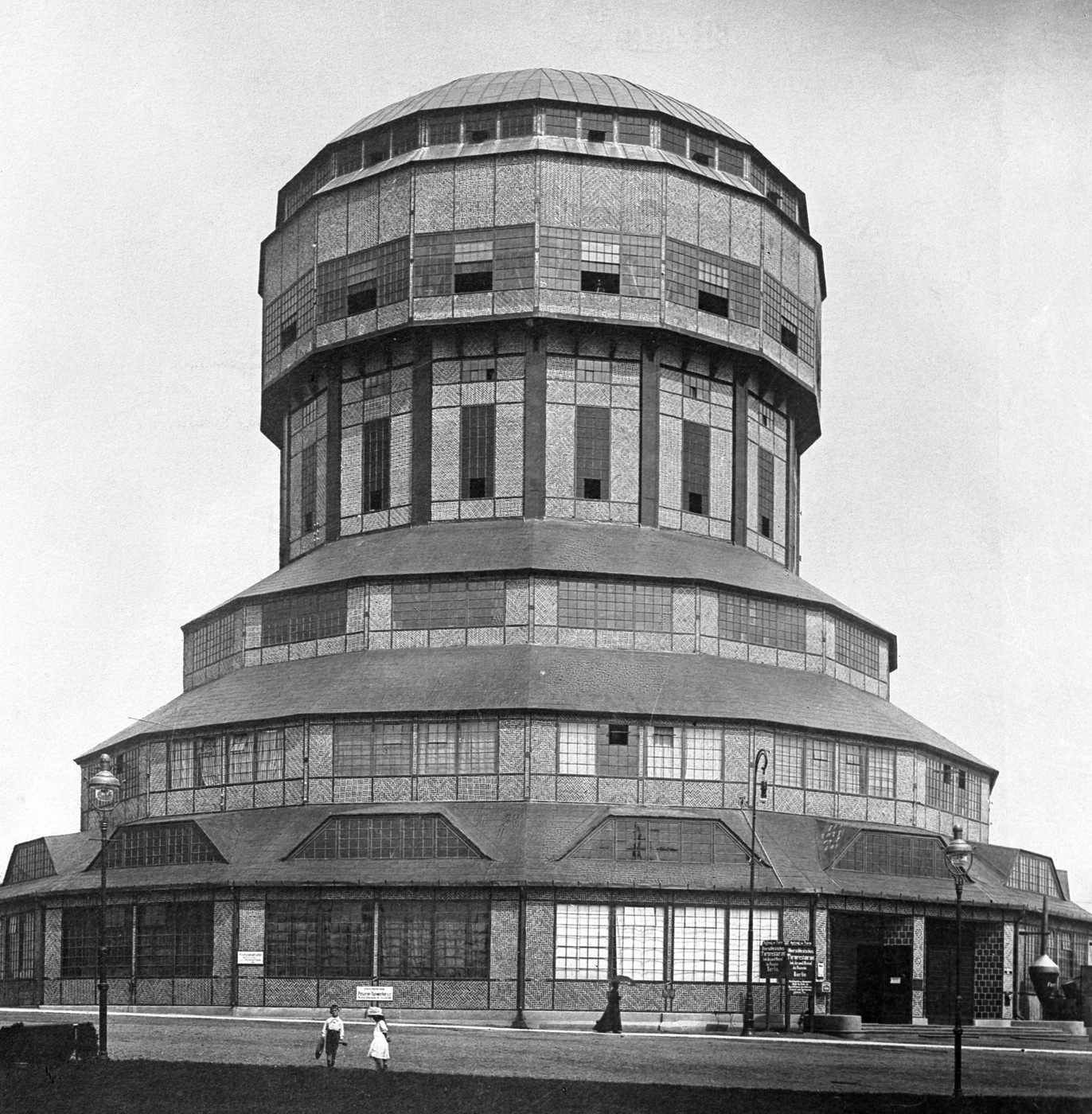
Water tower in Poznań

=== Buildings ===
- 1901 Church spire, Wrocław
- 1904 A Family house with garden pavilion for the arts and crafts exhibition
- 1908 Dwelling houses, corner of Menzelstraße and Wölflstraße in Breslau, (now Sztabowa/Pocztowa, Wrocław)
- 1908 Dwelling house, Hohenzollernstraße, Breslau (no longer standing)
- 1907 – c. 1909: mixed commercial offices and retail, Hohenzollernstraße, Wrocław (no longer standing)
- 1911 Sulphuric acid factory in Luboń
- 1911 Grain silo and Roofed Marketplace in Luboń
- 1911 Exhibition Hall and Tower in Poznań for an industrial fair (destroyed)
- 1912 Department store in Junkernstrasse, Wrocław (now ul. Ofiar Oświęcimskich)
- 1913 Four Domes Pavilion, Wrocław (now part of UNESCO World Heritage Site "Centennial Hall")
- 1919 Grosses Schauspielhaus, in Berlin
- 1920 Festival Theater for Salzburg
- 1924 Office building, Hanover
- 1925 Capitol am Zoo, between the Berlin zoo and Kaiser Wilhelm Memorial Church in Charlottenburg, Berlin (destroyed by bombing).
- 1927 Deli cinema, Wrocław (now demolished)
- 1929 Haus des Rundfunks (Radio Station), Charlottenburg, Berlin
- 1929 Kino Babylon, Mitte, Berlin
- 1931 I.G. Farben Building in Frankfurt

=== Projects ===
- Palace of the Soviets
- League of Nations
- 1920 – Film sets for The Golem: How He Came into the World
- 1921 – Friedrichstraße Station Skyscraper competition in Berlin
- 1925 – Capitol, cinema, Berlin
- 1926 – German Forum for Sport, Berlin
