= Ernst Renz =

German circus director (1815–1892)

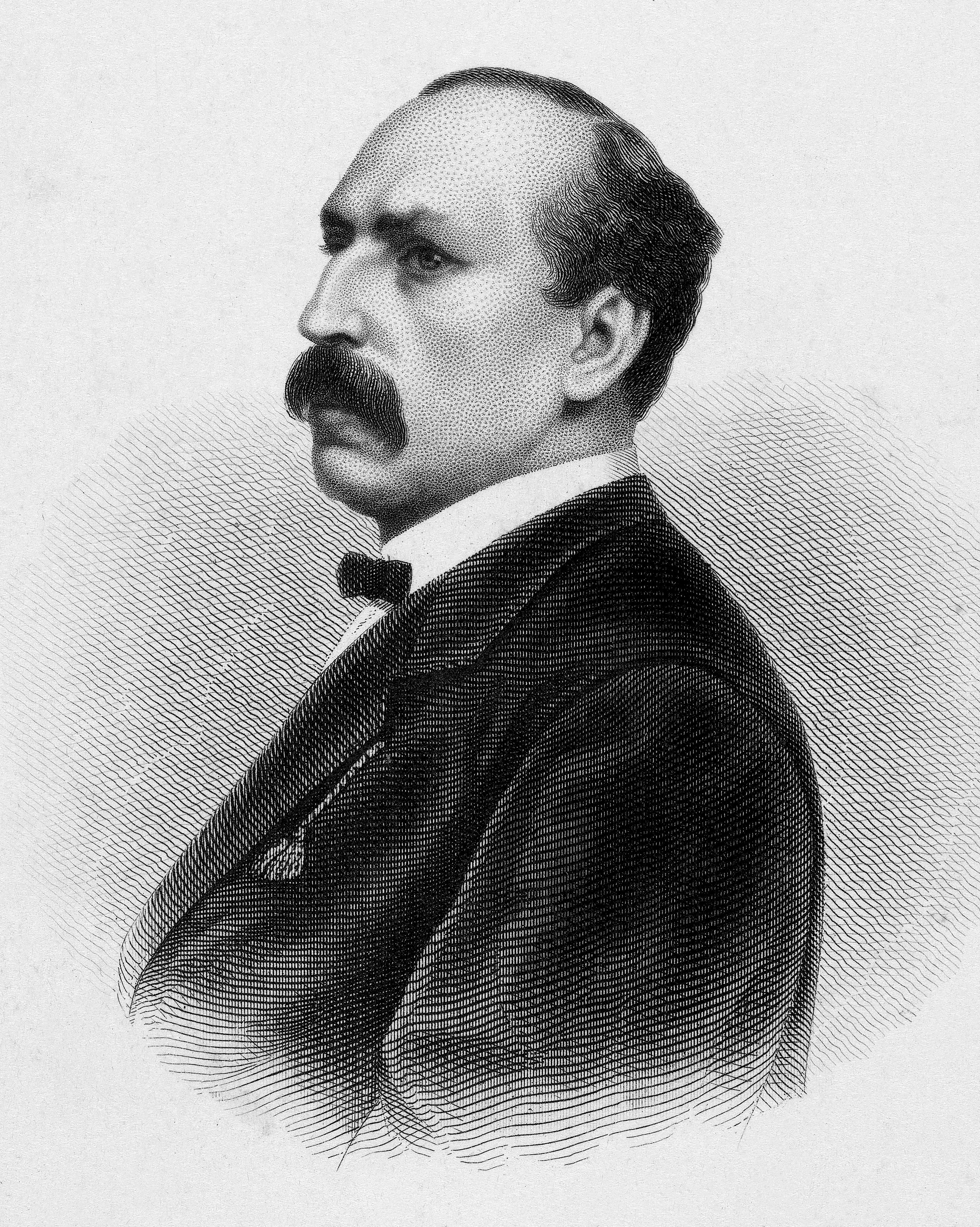
- Born: Ernst Jakob Renz; May 18, 1815; Böckingen, Kingdom of Württemberg
- Died: April 3, 1892 (aged 76); Berlin, Germany
- Resting place: Dorotheenstadt cemetery II
- Occupation: Circus proprietor
- Known for: Circus Renz

Ernst Renz (May 18, 1815 – April 3, 1892) was a German showman and circus proprietor who was the founder of the Circus Renz.

== Early life ==
Ernst Jakob Renz was born on May 18, 1815, in Böckingen, Kingdom of Württemberg (now part of Heilbronn, Baden-Württemberg, Germany).

As a five-year-old, he became passionate about gymnastics, particularly after seeing the Marwald Equestrian and Tightrope Walking Society perform in his hometown. The director recognized his abilities and recruited him as a junior performer after consulting with his father.

== Career ==
Renz began performing at age six under director Marwald, traveling through France, Germany, and Holland. Marwald's wife, a tightrope walker, became his surrogate mother, and he was regarded as the director's son. Ernst took on business duties, including securing police permits. After her death when he was 13, the company declined rapidly, shrinking to four members before selling its assets.

The company dissolved, prompting Renz to join the Stoch Society, where he refined his core skills. Stoch later transferred him to circus director Brilloff for a small sum. At 15, Renz secretly experimented with horse training, keeping his efforts hidden from Brilloff. When the director caught him practicing, he immediately recognized the youth's natural gifts and granted permission to continue formally. By 19, he ranked among the first school and mime riders, having earlier distinguished himself as an aerialist, tightrope performer, acrobat, and comic vaulter.

When Renz was 22, he wed the sister of well-known circus director Wilheim Carré. Following Brilloff's death in 1841, Ernst Renz created a partnership that included Wilheim Carré, Louis Salamonsky, and Gotthold Schumann, forming a seven-member troupe. After years of struggling on tour, Renz reached Munich in March 1845 and challenged Louis Soullier's circus despite his partners' reluctance. With six rented horses and costumes, he debuted on March 26, performing seven of sixteen acts with his wife and four artists. He outcompeted Soullier and established Munich, Breslau (now Wrocław), Magdeburg, and Dresden as his primary venues.

Renz arrived in Berlin with his company in 1847 and opened a circus at the Dönhoff Theater. He established his circus under the name Circus Olympic. The season opened on January 21, 1847, featuring the first grand historical pantomime staged in Germany.

He ran a provisional circus on Charlottenstrasse in 1849, then competed directly with Louis Dejean in 1850. Renz won the public's support. After losing to Fabre the following year, Dejean voluntarily transferred his circus to Renz, while Louis Salamonsky resigned around the same time.

Ernst Renz established himself at the Friedrichstraße circus location in 1852 after Dejean departed Berlin, where he performed until the mid-1870s. In 1853, he commissioned architects May and Schebeck to construct a circus on Zirkusgasse in Vienna.

His company became known as Circus Renz. He introduced pantomimes and féeries to his circus programs. He employed a permanent ballet corps for these productions. Additionally, Renz developed programs for training various exotic animals, including deer, llamas, camels, lions, and elephants. At its height, his stables contained at least 150 horses.

Renz moved into the Market Hall Circus building (now Friedrichstadt-Palast) in Berlin, taking over the venue Albert Salamonsky had left vacant in 1879, and enjoyed years of commercial success there.

In the mid-1880s, he leased the Circus Building, Copenhagen for three years until 1888.

== Personal life ==
Ernst Renz's children included three sons, Franz, Adolph, and Ernst, as well as two daughters, Amanda and Antonie.

== Death ==
Ernst Jakob Renz died on April 3, 1892, in Berlin, Germany, at 76 years old. He fell ill with a cold while traveling in an open carriage approximately three weeks before his death.

== Legacy ==
At his death, his fortune was estimated at 15 million marks by those familiar with his affairs. His assets included permanent circus buildings in Vienna, Berlin, Hamburg, and Breslau.

The 1943 German drama film Circuz Renz was loosely based on his career.

In recognition of the 100th anniversary of his death, the German postal service distributed a stamp featuring Ernst Renz on March 12, 1992.

== Gallery ==
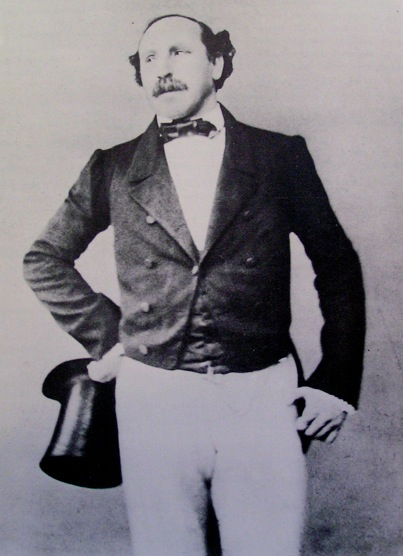
Ernst Renz, circus director, c. 1860

== See also ==
- Circus Renz
