= Albert Salamonsky =

German circus proprietor (1839-1913)

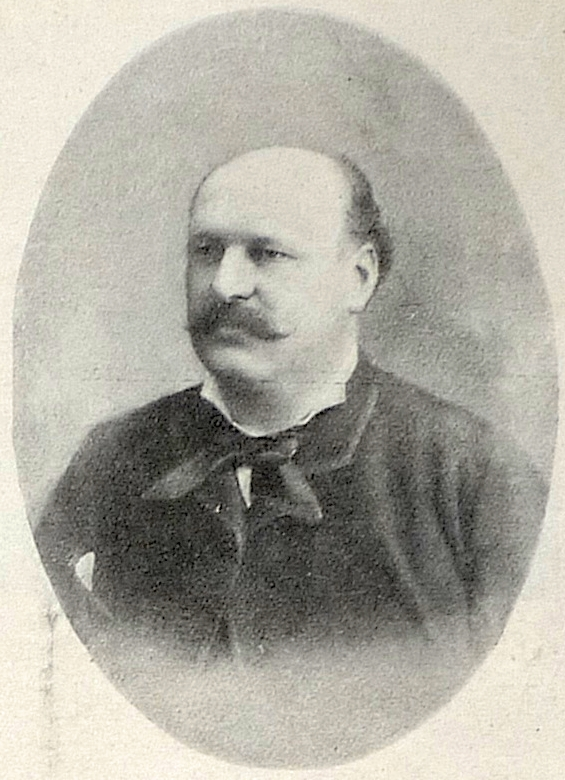
- Born: Albert Wilhelmovich Salamonsky; June 18, 1839; Italy
- Died: June 22, 1913 (aged 74); Moscow, Russia
- Resting place: Vvedenskoye Cemetery
- Occupation: Circus proprietor
- Known for: Moscow Circus on Tsvetnoy Boulevard
- Spouse: Lina Schwartz

Albert Salamonsky (June 18, 1839 – June 22, 1913) was a German equestrian performer, horse trainer, acrobat, and circus proprietor.

== Early life ==
Albert Wilhelmovich Salamonsky was born on June 18, 1839.

Albert was the son of circus rider Wilhelm Salamonsky. His father, a member of an old Jewish circus family, established himself in Berlin and worked as an associate of the renowned circus director Ernst Renz of Circus Renz. Albert trained under his father and gained renown as a bareback rider.

== Career ==
Albert Salamonsky began his career as an equestrian performer and gymnast. An advertisement for London's Holborn Theatre on November 6, 1868, commended Salamonsky's three-horse act titled "Le Jeux Romains" (French: The Roman Games).

Salamonsky married the accomplished equestrian Lina Schwartz in 1868.

He soon set up his own circus, the Circus Salamonsky, in Warsaw, Poland, at Włodzimierzowska Street (now Czackiego Street). After founding his circus in 1873, Salamonsky and Oscar Carré held two of the largest circuses in Europe and became the principal competitors to Ernst Renz. In November 1873, he acquired sizable buildings at Neuer Markt in Berlin for £75,000 and renovated them into a multi-purpose circus complex with dining and refreshment amenities. There, he established Salamonsky's Grand Circus and amphitheatre.

By 1875, his circus traveled via a special train comprising at least fifty carriages when moving between towns, with Berlin serving as his winter quarters. Salamonsky left for Saint Petersburg with his circus establishment in 1879. In Saint Petersburg, Salamonsky vied with the Italian impresario Gaetano Ciniselli for control of the circus industry.

His tour of Odesa, the Russian Empire's fourth-largest city at the time, inspired Salamonsky to settle there and build a stationary circus venue. He opened Odesa's first circus in 1879, located at 37 Koblevskaya Street.

On October 20, 1880, Salamonsky opened Moscow's first circus, the Moscow Circus on Tsvetnoy Boulevard. At the premiere performance, he himself took part as a performer.

His next venture following his establishments in Moscow and Odessa was a circus venue in Riga, Latvia. Salamonsky commissioned the circus building, which opened in 1888 in the city center adjacent to Vērmane Garden, featuring a large dome structure.

== Death ==
Albert Salamonsky died on June 22, 1913, in Moscow, Russia, at age 74. He was interred at Vvedenskoye Cemetery.
