= Bank der Deutschen Arbeit =

Former German bank

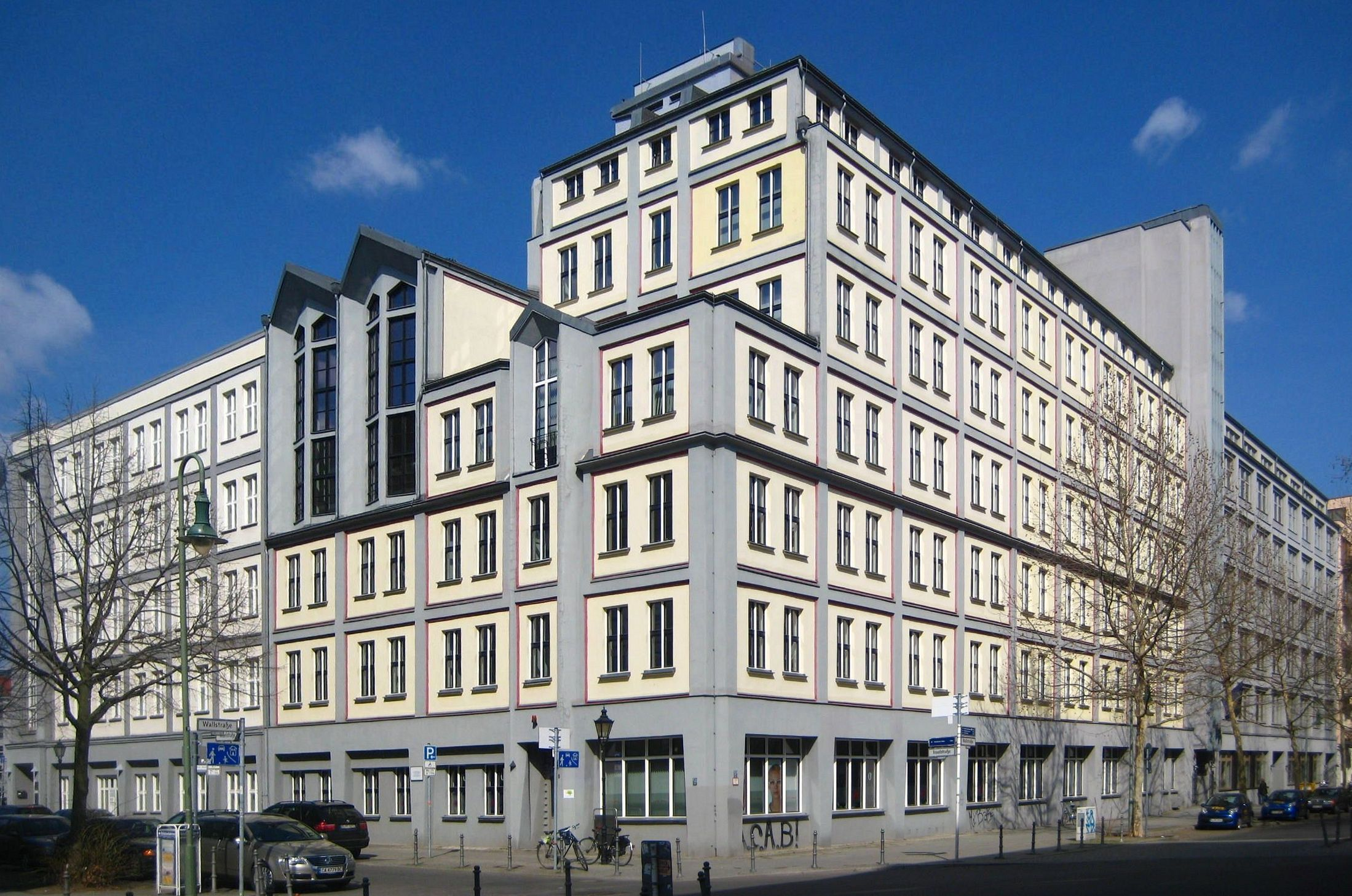
Former head office in Berlin

The Bank der deutschen Arbeit (BdA, lit. 'Bank of German Labor') was a financial institution of the German Labor Front (DAF), based in Berlin.

== Overview ==
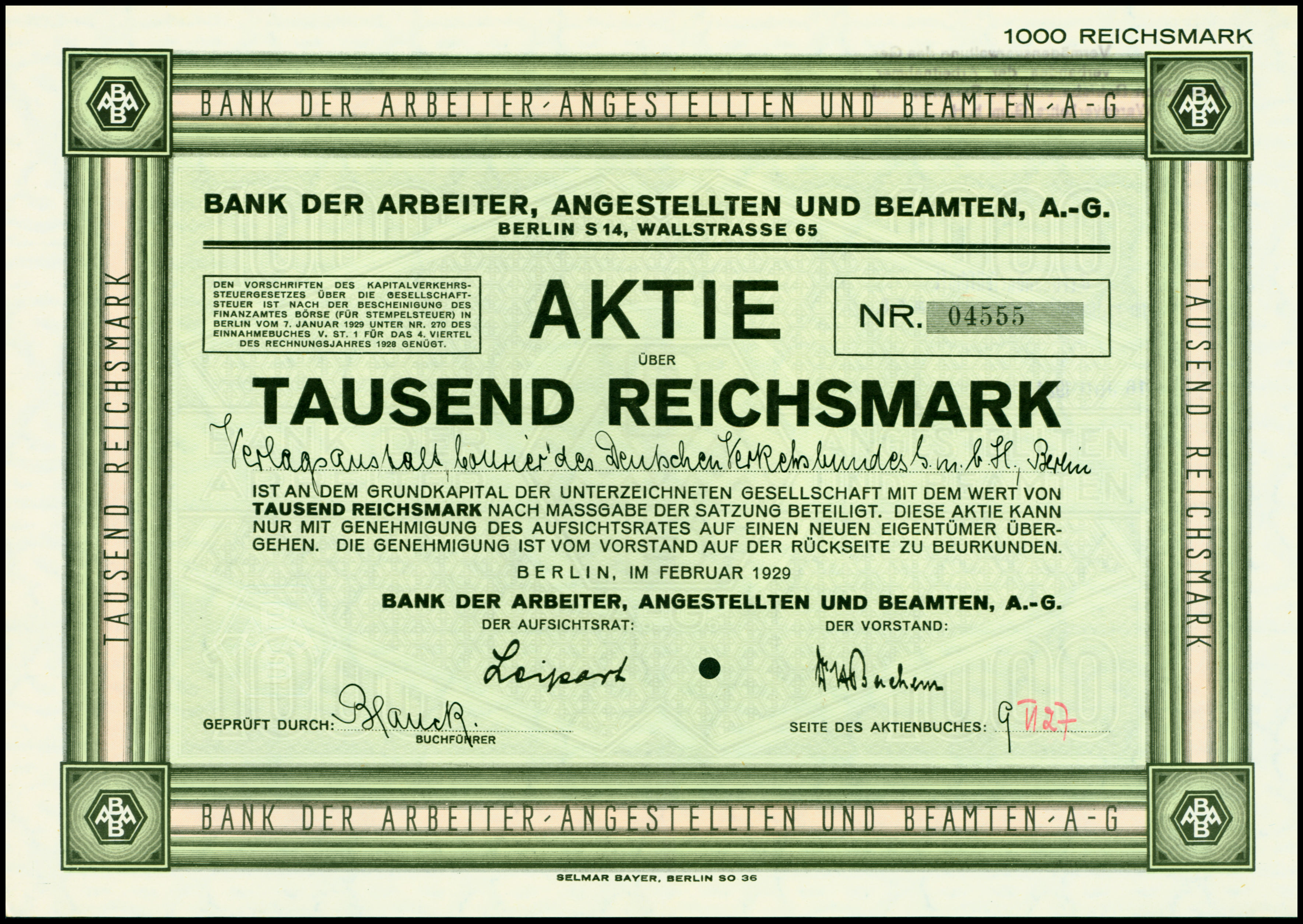
Share of the Bank der Arbeiter, Angestellten und Beamten AG, issued February 1929

Founded in 1924 as the Bank of Workers, Employees, and Civil Servants (German: Bank der Arbeiter, Angestellten und Beamten AG) by organizations representing these groups, the bank was taken over by the DAF and renamed after the Nazi government banned all independent trade unions on 2 May 1933. Its assets expanded rapidly under the Nazi government, from 151 million Reichsmarks at end-1931 to 918 million in 1939.

The existence of the BdA came to an abrupt end in 1945, as the allied occupation forces agreed to liquidate it.

== Head office ==
The BdA appropriated an office building at Wallstrasse 61-65 in Berlin, which had been commissioned by the General German Trade Union Federation (ADGB, dissolved in 1933) from architects Max Taut and Franz Hoffmann and built in 1922-1923, then extended in 1930-1932 along Wallstrasse on a design by Walter Würzbach. From 1945 to 1990, it became the seat of the Free German Trade Union Federation. It has since been used as a commercial office building.

== See also ==
- Reichs-Kredit-Gesellschaft
- List of banks in Germany
