= Hanstein Castle =

Ruined castle in Eichsfeld, Germany

Coordinates: 51.339°N 9.940°E

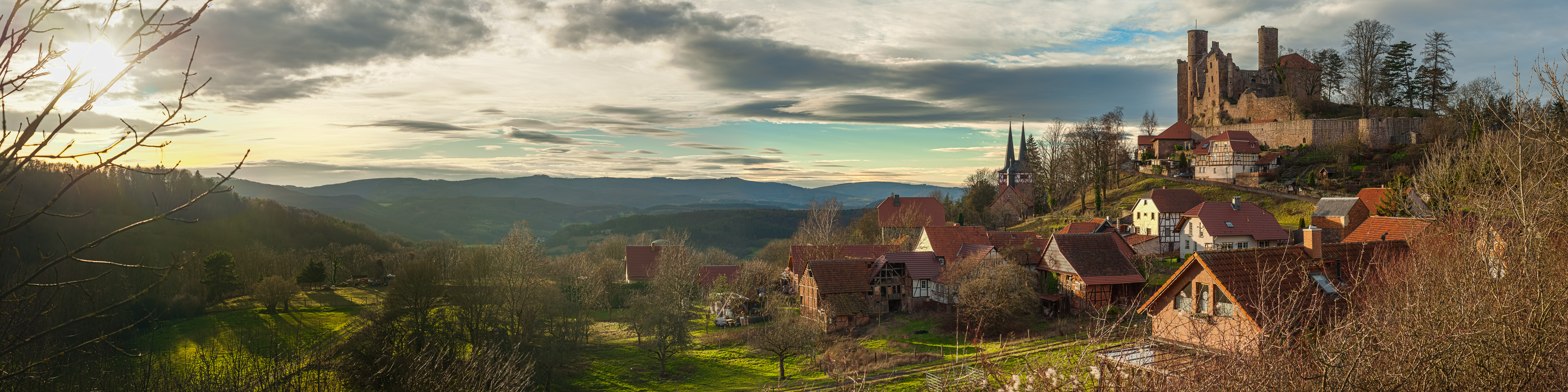
Ruins of Hanstein Castle

Hanstein Castle is a ruined castle in Central Germany near Bornhagen in the Eichsfeld, situated above the river Werra in Thuringia. The name of the nobles von Hansteins, most notable Fritz Huschke von Hanstein, derived from the castle.

== History ==
The older assumption that Hanstein Castle was first mentioned in a document in the 9th century in the "Traditions" (donation notes) of the Corvey Monastery is outdated by recent research; the place mentioned there "Haanstedihus" designates one of the two present-day communities Hanstedt (Nordheide) or Hanstedt (district of Uelzen). The earliest mention of Hanstein Castle known so far comes from Lampert von Hersfeld on the occasion of its destruction by Heinrich IV. In 1070. The castle, which was owned by Count Otto von Northeim, must have been built some time before 1070. Its destruction by the king shows its importance for this part of the high mediaeval tribal duchy of Saxony and for the Saxon nobility (see Sachsenkrieg (Heinrich IV.). It can be assumed whether the previous castle was on the site of today's castle ruins. Not far on the mountainside of the neighboring Junkerkuppe there was another "old castle", the meaning of which is not clearly proven. Since the castle was owned by Otto von Northeim, he probably rebuilt it in the following years.

In 1308, Heinrich and Lippold von Hanstein with the permission of Bishop Peter of Aspelt began to re-build the whole of the castle. The walls and gates destroyed during the Thirty Years' War were re-built between 1655 and 1658. In 1840, the building of a new hall for family conferences was being finished.

Massive renovations between 1904 and 1907.

In 1946, Hanstein Castle became the property of the German Democratic Republic. Due to the fact that the border was only several hundred meters away one of the towers was used by the border guard as a watch tower. Some renovations started in 1985, although no tourists were allowed to go to the castle, because of the border.

== The castle today ==
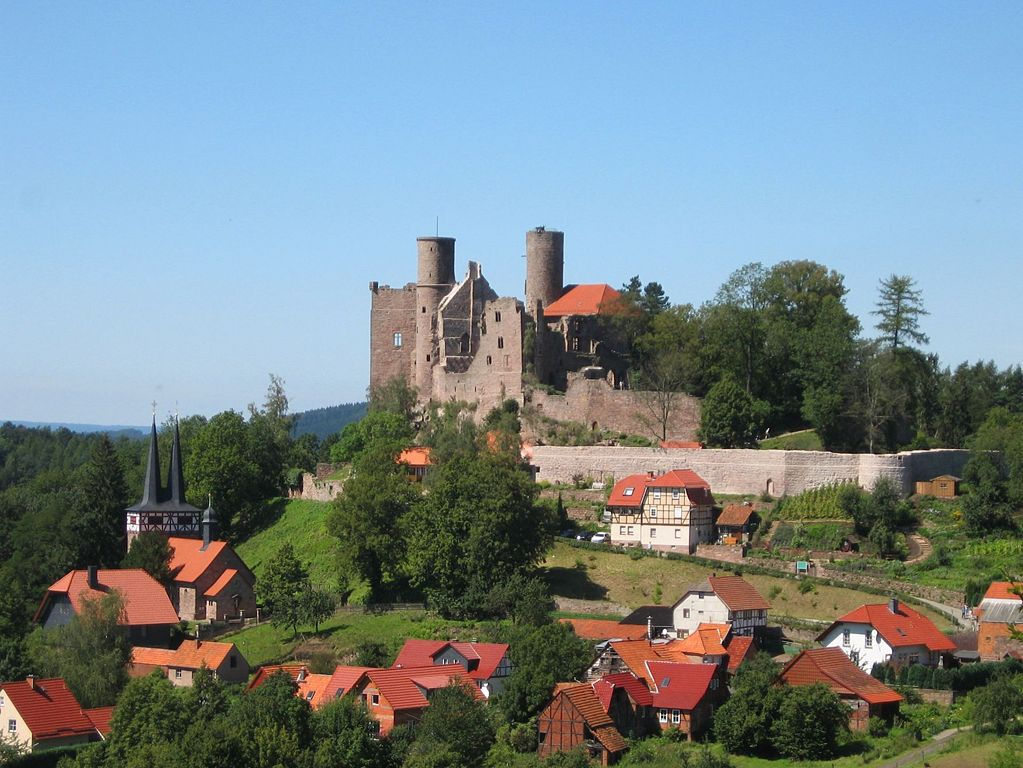
Hanstein Castle, a more closer view

Since 1990, Hanstein Castle has belonged to the municipal council of Bornhagen. English photographer Mark Robert Davey helped the castle in 2006 by raising money with his black-and-white photograph of the Hanstein. In 2008, Hanstein Castle celebrated 700 years. Various festivals take place every year.
