= Circus Renz (1943 film) =

1943 film directed by Arthur Maria Rabenalt

- Film poster
- German: Zirkus Renz
- Directed by: Arthur Maria Rabenalt
- Written by: Roland Betsch; Otto Ernst Hesse
- Produced by: Alf Teichs
- Starring: René Deltgen; Paul Klinger; Angelika Hauff; Alice Treff
- Cinematography: Willy Winterstein
- Edited by: Gertrud Hinz-Nischwitz
- Music by: Albert Fischer
- Production company: Terra Film
- Distributed by: Deutsche Filmvertriebs
- Release date: 10 September 1943
- Running time: 88 minutes
- Country: Germany
- Language: German
- Budget: 2,149,000 ℛ︁ℳ︁

Circus Renz (German: Zirkus Renz) is a 1943 German drama film directed by Arthur Maria Rabenalt and starring René Deltgen, Paul Klinger and Angelika Hauff. It is a circus film, made as a deliberately escapist release at a time when the Second World War was starting to turn against Germany and its allies. The film takes its title from the real Circus Renz and is loosely based on the career of its founder Ernst Renz. It premiered at Berlin's UFA-Palast am Zoo in September 1943. It was a major commercial success.

It was made partly at the Babelsberg Studios in Berlin. The film's sets were designed by the art director Ernst H. Albrecht. Location shooting took place around Breslau in Silesia.

== Cast ==
- René Deltgen as Ernst Renz
- Paul Klinger as Harms
- Angelika Hauff as Bettina Althoff
- Alice Treff as Frau von Grunau
- Fritz Odemar as Herr von Grunau
- Herbert Hübner as Circus Master Déjean
- Willi Rose as Schwenz
- Ernst Waldow as Polizeirat Bastian
- Werner Pledath as The King
- Rudolf Schündler as Litfaß
- Gunnar Möller as Willi, baker's boy
- Charlotte Schultz as Gräfin Ziegenreuth
- Lotte Spira as Frau Bastian
- Gerhard Dammann as Konstabler Klemke
- Adolf Fischer as Artist
- Walter Steinweg as Artist
- Hildegard Grethe as Gräfin Geiersberg
- Kurt Hagen as Dostler, Kammerherr
- Hanns Waschatko as Adjutant
- Eduard Wenck as Torschreiber
- Klaus Pohl as Stefan - Bärenführer
- Hermann Pfeiffer as Schwiemel

== Bibliography ==
- Bock, Hans-Michael & Bergfelder, Tim. The Concise CineGraph. Encyclopedia of German Cinema. Berghahn Books, 2009.
- Moeller, Felix. The Film Minister: Goebbels and the Cinema in the Third Reich. Edition Axel Menges, 2000.
