= Circus Renz =

German circus company

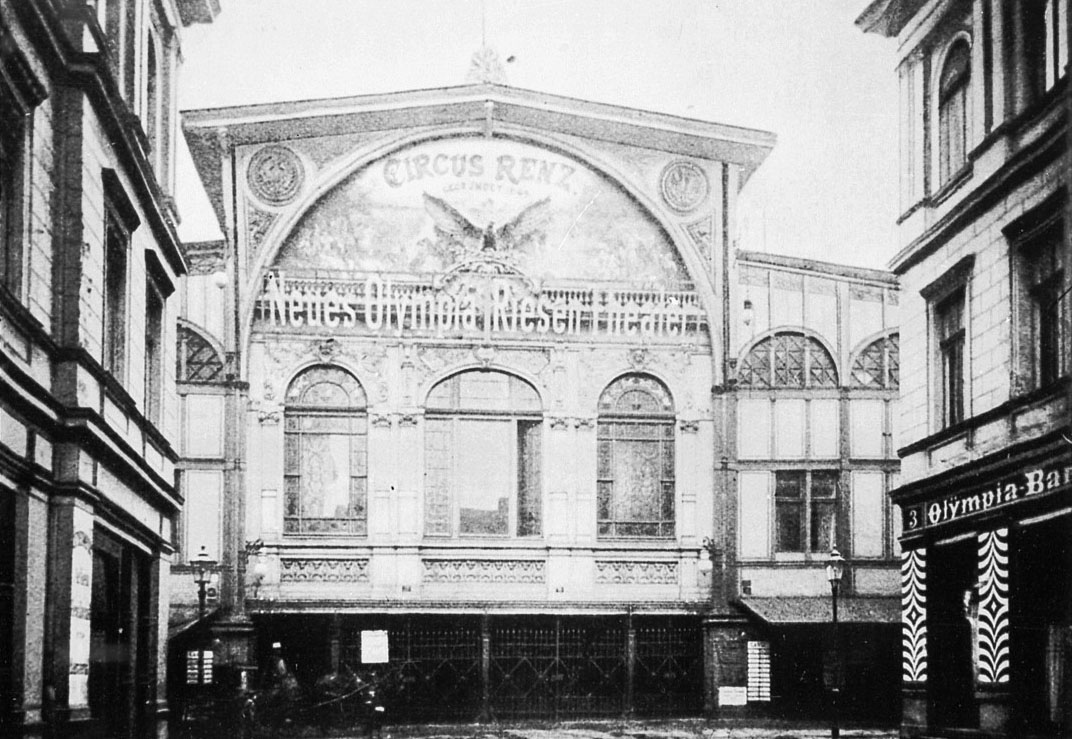
Former Circus Renz building, Berlin, 1898

Circus Renz was a German circus company. It was established in 1842 in Berlin by Ernst Jakob Renz (1815–1892) as Circus Olympic and existed until 1897. The company had several stationary buildings in Berlin, Hamburg, Bremen, Breslau and Vienna.

Today several circus companies in Germany make use of the family name Renz. Among them, Circus Universal Renz and Zirkus Renz Manege are the biggest. Apart from them, there are other circusses of the name Renz out of Germany, e.g. Dutch Circus Renz International, Circus Renz Berlin and Circus Herman Renz, who are often falsely assumed to be linked to the famous dynasty.

== The historical head office in Berlin ==
The circus' Berlin headquarters was established in 1842 as Circus Olympic. On 25 May 1867 Johann Strauss II and Benjamin Bilse' Band gave the Berlin premiere of The Blue Danube in that building. Because of the construction of Berlin Friedrichstraße station, the property had to be abandoned. On 20 April 1879 the circus moved into the former Berlin market hall (later Friedrichstadt-Palast). In 1888 the auditorium was augmented to 5.600 seats.

Ernst Renz' son Franz had to close the company on 31 July 1897 due to financial difficulties. On 28 October 1899 Albert Schumann (1858–1939) took over the Berlin circus building and operated his own Circus Schumann until 1918.

In 1940, Ernst Renz' great-nephew, Bernhard Renz, re-established a touring circus under the family name. When he died in 2012, he was the oldest recorded circus director at the age of 91. His descendants continue to lead their own circuses, carrying the Renz name.

== References in popular culture ==
- Circus Renz (Zirkus Renz) is the title of a German movie from 1943, premiered on 10 September 1943. It was directed by Arthur Maria Rabenalt, actors included René Deltgen (Renz), Paul Klinger (Harms), Angelika Hauff (Bettina), Gunnar Möller, Willi Rose and Alice Treff.
- Souvenir de Cirque Renz (Memory of Circus Renz) is the title of a quick and technically demanding galop for xylophone and orchestra, written around 1894 by Hungarian composer Gustav Peter (1833–1919). Nowadays it is part of the standard repertoire of ambitious xylophonists. Another musical reminiscence is the Gavotte Circus Renz, written by Hermann Fliege in 1882.
