= Joker: Folie à Deux (soundtrack) =

2024 soundtrack album

Joker: Folie à Deux (Music from the Motion Picture)

Soundtrack album by Joaquin Phoenix and Lady Gaga
- Released: October 4, 2024
- Length: 41:21
- Label: Interscope
- Producers: David Campbell; George Drakoulias; Lady Gaga; Stewart Lerman; Todd Phillips; Joaquin Phoenix; Randall Poster; Jason Ruder; Nick Urata

Lady Gaga chronology
Harlequin (2024)	Joker: Folie à Deux (Music from the Motion Picture) (2024)	Mayhem (2025)

Joker: Folie à Deux (Music from the Motion Picture) is the soundtrack album to the 2024 musical film Joker: Folie à Deux, primarily performed by Joaquin Phoenix and Lady Gaga, who portray Arthur Fleck (the Joker) and Lee Quinzel (Harley Quinn), respectively. Released on October 4, 2024, through Interscope Records, the album consists mainly of cover versions of popular songs and standards, performed as solos and duets, alongside "Folie à Deux", an original composition written by Gaga. Australian musician Nick Cave performs the opening medley. Phoenix and Gaga recorded much of their singing live during filming, with musical arrangements subsequently developed around their performances.

Joker: Folie à Deux topped the UK Soundtrack Albums Chart and reached number six on the US Billboard Soundtrack Albums chart. Critics praised some of Gaga's performances but were divided over Phoenix's singing. A week before the soundtrack's release, Gaga issued Harlequin (2024), a separate companion album featuring alternative interpretations of several songs from the film.

== Development ==
The musical direction of Joker: Folie à Deux originated with an idea Joaquin Phoenix shared with director Todd Phillips while filming Joker (2019). Phoenix described a dream in which his character, Arthur Fleck (the Joker), performed comedy and songs onstage. The concept subsequently influenced Phillips and co-writer Scott Silver as they developed the sequel, with music serving as a means for Arthur to express emotions he could not convey through dialogue.

In June 2022, Phillips revealed the title Joker: Folie à Deux, and reports indicated that the sequel would be a musical, with Lady Gaga in negotiations to portray Harley Quinn opposite Phoenix. Phillips had previously worked with Gaga as a producer on A Star Is Born (2018), through which he became familiar with her acting abilities. Gaga confirmed her participation in August 2022 through a musical teaser featuring silhouettes of herself and Phoenix. In March 2024, Variety reported that the film would feature at least 15 cover songs, primarily reinterpretations of well-known songs in a jukebox musical format.

== Music and recording ==
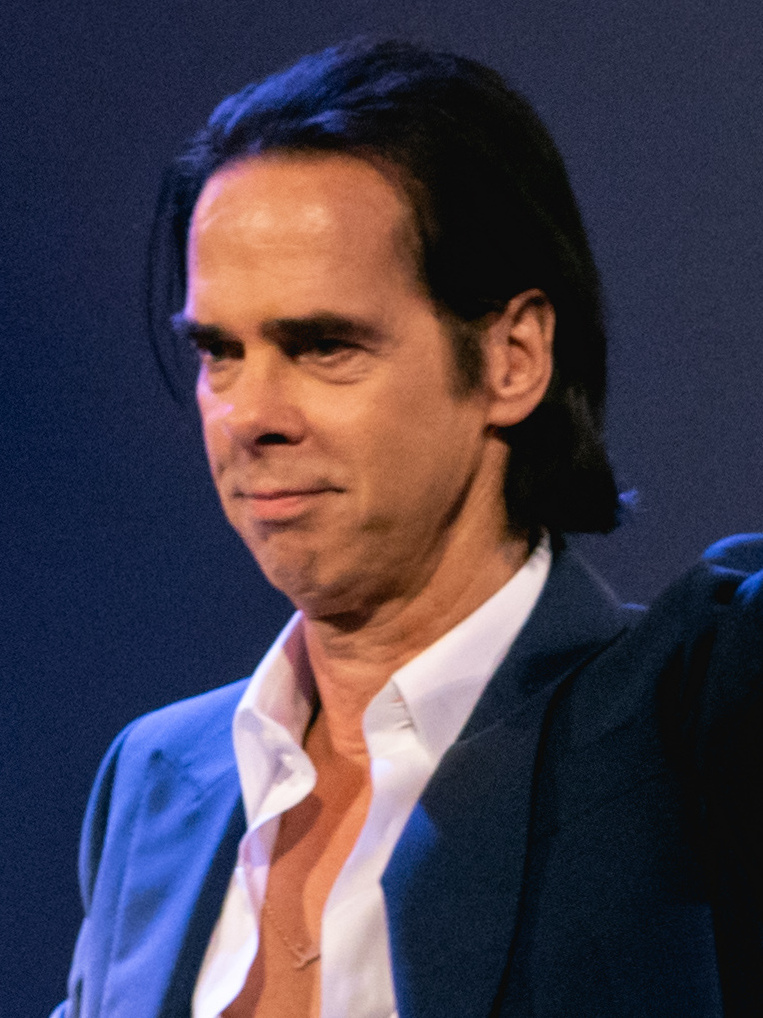
Nick Cave provides vocals for the soundtrack's opening medley.

Phillips explained that the songs were selected to evoke music Arthur might have heard his mother play during his childhood. The selections also reflected differences between the protagonists, with Arthur generally favoring romantic ballads and Gaga's character, Lee, gravitating toward songs about power. The soundtrack's only original composition is "Folie à Deux", a waltz written and performed by Gaga. Phoenix and Gaga adjusted their singing styles to suit their characters. Phoenix initially looked to singers such as Frank Sinatra for inspiration, but felt that Arthur should not sound like a professional singer. He decided that mistakes in phrasing and notes would better suit the character. Gaga also moved away from her usual singing techniques to find Lee's voice.

Gaga suggested recording their vocals live on set, an idea Phoenix initially opposed. Rather than sing along to prerecorded tracks, the actors were accompanied by off-camera pianists who adjusted to their pace, allowing each take to differ. Production sound mixer Steven Morrow explained that the piano accompaniment was transmitted to the actors through earpieces, enabling their vocals to be recorded separately. During post-production, executive music producer Jason Ruder constructed the arrangements around the selected vocal performances. Because the actors had recorded without a click track, he had to adapt the music to their varying tempos rather than follow a predetermined rhythm. Recordings from different takes were edited together, with some vocals re-recorded in a studio as needed.

The album opens with a medley performed by Australian musician Nick Cave, combining "Slap That Bass", "Get Happy" and "What the World Needs Now Is Love". Kory Grow of Rolling Stone observed that Cave's vocals were most recognizable during "What the World Needs Now Is Love", while his voice was less distinguishable in the preceding songs. Chris DeVille of Stereogum compared the soundtrack with Harlequin, Gaga's companion album featuring alternative interpretations of several songs from the film. He noted that the soundtrack presented darker versions of the songs shared by the two albums. Reviewing the film for Le Monde, Jacques Mandelbaum described its musical arrangements as subtly altered, darker and unsteady, but ultimately moving.

== Promotion and release ==
Speaking to Variety in August 2024, director Todd Phillips discussed the film's musical performances, including renditions of "Get Happy", "For Once in My Life", and "That's Life". A first teaser released on September 3, 2024, featured Gaga and Phoenix singing "Get Happy", famously interpreted by Judy Garland. The same day, Interscope Records made CD and translucent red vinyl editions of the soundtrack available for pre-order. A second teaser, released on September 18, 2024, featured Gaga singing "That's Life", while other promotional material included excerpts of the songs "For Once in My Life" and "What the World Needs Now Is Love". Gaga's companion album Harlequin and a separate album containing Hildur Guðnadóttir's original instrumental score for the film were both released on September 27, 2024, the latter through WaterTower Music. The 16-track Joker: Folie à Deux soundtrack followed on October 4, through Interscope Records, coinciding with the film's theatrical release in the United States.

== Critical reception ==
A review in Filmtracks criticized the contrast between the soundtrack's jazz and big-band arrangements and Hildur Guðnadóttir's somber instrumental score, finding the two musical approaches poorly integrated. Despite criticizing Phoenix's vocals and Gaga's underutilized singing abilities, the reviewer considered "Folie à Deux" possibly the soundtrack's most appealing song, highlighting its waltz arrangement. A review by Quim Casas in Rockdelux praised Gaga's rendition of "(They Long to Be) Close to You" for its airy arrangements of vibraphone, strings and piano, while characterizing her "That's Entertainment!" as a ballad of broken dreams. He also found that Phoenix's rough, dissonant vocals complemented Gaga's singing on "To Love Somebody", and contrasted their gospel-style performance of "Gonna Build a Mountain" with Phoenix's more subdued solo reprise. Kaelen Bell of Exclaim! singled out Phoenix's rendition of Daniel Johnston's "True Love Will Find You in the End" as the album's most interesting moment.

In a February 2026 ranking of Lady Gaga's albums for Spin, Al Shipley placed the Joker: Folie à Deux soundtrack last. He wrote that the album peaked early with the Nick Cave big-band medley and that Phoenix's vocals were "even harder to listen to" outside the context of the film. Shipley praised Gaga's performances of "That's Entertainment!" and "I've Got the World on a String", finding them most effective when she "really gets into character" and sings more like "an unhinged criminal than a seasoned pop star". The same year, Sophie Ehmke of Musikexpress similarly ranked the soundtrack last in Gaga's discography, describing it as comparatively restrained and lacking the emotional variety and engaging quality of the A Star Is Born soundtrack.

== Commercial performance ==
Joker: Folie à Deux topped the UK Soundtrack Albums Chart, while reaching number two on the UK Jazz & Blues Albums Chart and number nine on the UK Compilation Albums Chart. It also reached number six on the Irish Compilations Chart. In the United States, the soundtrack peaked at number six on the Billboard Soundtrack Albums chart and number 23 on the Top Album Sales chart.

Across continental Europe, the soundtrack achieved its highest position on a national albums chart in Austria, where it peaked at number 10. It also reached number 21 in Switzerland, number 29 in Wallonia, and number 39 in France. Elsewhere, the album peaked at number 40 on the Croatian International Albums chart, number 43 in Germany, number 44 in Spain, number 51 in Flanders, and number 59 in Portugal. It additionally reached number 62 on the Polish Physical Albums chart and number 92 in Italy. In Japan, the album peaked at number 86 on the Billboard Japan Hot Albums chart.

== Track listing ==
Joker: Folie à Deux (Music from the Motion Picture) track listing
No.	Title	Writer(s)	Performer(s)	Length
1.	"Slap That Bass" / "Get Happy" / "What the World Needs Now Is Love"	George Gershwin; Ira Gershwin; Harold Arlen; Ted Koehler; Burt Bacharach; Hal David	Nick Cave	3:16
2.	"For Once in My Life"	Ron Miller; Orlando Murden	Joaquin Phoenix	2:49
3.	"If My Friends Could See Me Now"	Cy Coleman; Dorothy Fields	Lady Gaga; Phoenix	3:12
4.	"Folie à Deux"	Lady Gaga	Gaga	1:44
5.	"Bewitched"	Lorenz Hart; Richard Rodgers	Phoenix; Gaga	2:58
6.	"That's Entertainment"	Howard Dietz; Arthur Schwartz	Gaga	1:40
7.	"When You're Smiling (The Whole World Smiles with You)"	Mark Fisher; Joe Goodwin; Larry Shay	Phoenix	1:45
8.	"To Love Somebody"	Barry Gibb; Robin Gibb	Phoenix; Gaga	1:49
9.	"(They Long to Be) Close to You"	Bacharach; David	Gaga; Phoenix	2:48
10.	"The Joker"	Leslie Bricusse; Anthony Newley	Phoenix	3:41
11.	"Gonna Build a Mountain"	Bricusse; Newley	Gaga; Phoenix	3:18
12.	"I've Got the World on a String"	Arlen; Koehler	Gaga	2:05
13.	"If You Go Away"	Jacques Brel; Rod McKuen (Note: English translation.)	Phoenix	3:19
14.	"Gonna Build a Mountain" (reprise)	Bricusse; Newley	Phoenix	1:52
15.	"That's Life"	Dean Kay; Kelly Gordon	Gaga	3:03
16.	"True Love Will Find You in the End"	Daniel Johnston	Phoenix	2:02
Total length:				41:21

== Personnel ==
Credits are adapted from Universal Music's published track-by-track information.

Vocals

- Celeste Butler – vocals (track 14)
- Nick Cave – vocals (track 1)
- Alvin Chea – vocals (track 1)
- Meloney Collins – vocals (track 15)
- Lady Gaga – vocals (tracks 3, 4, 5, 6, 8, 9, 11, 12, 14 and 15)
- Jarrett Johnson – vocals (track 1)
- Ashley Levin – vocals (tracks 14 and 15)
- Sara Mann – vocals (track 15)
- Jamal Moore – vocals (track 1)
- Joaquin Phoenix – vocals (tracks 2, 3, 5, 7, 8, 9, 10, 11, 13, 14 and 16)
- Kaylah Sharve – vocals (track 14)
- Antonio Sol – vocals (track 1)
- Ty Taylor – vocals (track 1)

Piano and keyboards

- Jeff Babko – keyboards (track 1); piano (tracks 1, 3, 6, 11 and 13)
- David Campbell – conducting and piano (track 15)
- Jim Cox – piano (tracks 2, 6, 9 and 10)
- Alex Jules – piano (tracks 2, 11 and 13)
- Madeline Lemay – keyboards (track 1)
- Thomas Ranier – keyboards (track 1)
- Alex Smith – piano (tracks 3, 9, 12 and 14); keyboards (tracks 4 and 16); organ (track 15)

Guitars, harp and accordion

- Joseph Burns – guitar (tracks 5 and 16)
- Marcia Dickstein – harp (tracks 4, 5 and 16)
- George Doering – guitar (tracks 3, 6, 9, 10 and 12)
- Gayle Levant – harp (track 3)
- Sergio Mendoza – accordion (tracks 5 and 16)
- Angie Swan – guitar (track 14)

Drums and percussion

- Donald Barrett – drums (tracks 2, 14 and 15); percussion (tracks 4 and 16)
- John Convertino – drums (tracks 3, 5 and 16)
- Wade Culbreath – drums (track 8)
- Bernie Dresel – drums (tracks 3, 6, 7 and 10)
- Clint De Ganon – drums (track 8)
- Marvin "MB" Gordy – drums (tracks 3 and 6)
- Jim Keltner – drums (track 12)
- Harvey Mason – drums (tracks 6 and 14)
- Hal Rosenfeld – drums (tracks 5, 12 and 16)

Violin

- Eun-Mee Ahn – violin (tracks 1, 2, 3, 4, 5, 6, 9, 12, 13, 15 and 16)
- Charlie Bisharat – violin (tracks 1, 2, 3, 4, 5, 7, 9, 10, 12, 13, 15 and 16)
- Roberto Cani – violin (tracks 2, 4, 5, 6, 9, 12, 13 and 16)
- Lorenz Gamma – violin (track 6)
- Jessica Guideri – violin (tracks 1, 2, 4, 5, 6, 7, 9, 10, 12, 13 and 16)
- Thomas Hagerman – violin (tracks 5 and 16)
- Tammy Hatwan – violin (tracks 2, 3, 4, 5, 6, 9, 12, 13 and 16)
- Amy Hershberger – violin (tracks 2, 4, 5, 6, 9, 12, 13 and 16)
- Luanne Homzy – violin (tracks 3, 6, 12 and 13)
- Ben Jacobson – violin (tracks 2, 4, 5, 6, 9, 12, 13, 15 and 16)
- Maia Jasper – violin (tracks 2, 4, 5, 6, 9, 12, 13 and 16)
- Max Karmazyn – violin (tracks 2, 4, 5, 6, 9, 12, 13 and 16)
- Dennis Kim – violin (tracks 2, 4, 5, 6, 9, 12, 13 and 16)
- Kevin Kumar – violin (tracks 4, 6 and 16)
- Ana Landaurer – violin (tracks 1, 3, 6, 12, 13 and 15)
- Songa Lee – violin (tracks 1, 3, 6, 7, 10, 12, 13 and 15)
- Natalie Leggett – violin (tracks 3, 6, 7, 10, 12 and 13)
- Phillip Levy – violin (tracks 1, 2, 3, 4, 5, 6, 7, 9, 10, 12, 13, 15 and 16)
- Lorand Lokuszta – violin (tracks 4 and 16)
- Maya Magub – violin (tracks 1, 2, 4, 5, 6, 7, 9, 10, 12, 13, 15 and 16)
- Stephanie Matthews – violin (tracks 2, 4, 5, 6, 9, 12, 13 and 16)
- Helen Nightengale – violin (tracks 4, 6 and 16)
- Grace Oh – violin (tracks 2, 4, 5, 6, 9, 12, 13 and 16)
- Joel Pargman – violin (tracks 2, 4, 5, 6, 9, 12, 13 and 16)
- Alyssa Park – violin (tracks 1, 2, 3, 4, 5, 6, 7, 9, 10, 12, 13 and 16)
- Sara Parkins – violin (tracks 1, 3, 6, 7, 10, 12 and 13)
- Kerenza Peacock – violin (tracks 1, 6, 7, 10 and 15)
- Heather Powell – violin (tracks 4 and 16)
- Rafael Rishik – violin (tracks 2, 4, 5, 6, 9, 12, 13 and 16)
- Tereza Stanislav – violin (tracks 1, 2, 4, 5, 6, 9, 12, 13, 15 and 16)
- Akiko Tarumoto – violin (tracks 4 and 16)
- Sarah Thornblade – violin (tracks 2, 4, 5, 9, 12, 13 and 16)
- Ina Veli – violin (tracks 2, 4, 5, 6, 9, 12, 13 and 16)
- Josefina Vergara – violin (tracks 1, 2, 4, 5, 6, 9, 12, 13 and 16)
- Shalini Vijayan – violin (tracks 2, 4, 5, 6, 9, 12, 13 and 16)
- Irina Voloshina – violin (tracks 2, 4, 5, 6, 9, 12, 13 and 16)

Viola and viol

- Victor de Almeida – viola (tracks 4 and 16)
- Ryan Baird – viol (track 6)
- Malachai Bandy – viola da gamba (tracks 2, 4, 5, 6, 9, 12, 13 and 16)
- Meredith Crawford – viola (tracks 2, 4, 5, 6, 9, 12, 13 and 16); cello (track 13)
- Zach Dellinger – viola (tracks 1, 2, 3, 4, 5, 6, 7, 9, 10, 12, 13, 15 and 16); cello (track 13)
- Andrew Duckles – viola (tracks 1, 2, 3, 4, 5, 6, 7, 9, 10, 12, 13 and 16); cello (track 13)
- Alma Fernandez – viola (tracks 2, 4, 5, 6, 9, 12, 13 and 16); cello (track 13)
- Matt Funes – viola (tracks 3, 6, 7, 10, 12, 13 and 15)
- Michael Larco – viola (tracks 4 and 16)
- Eva Lymenstull – viol (tracks 2, 4, 5, 9, 12, 13 and 16)
- Shawn Mann – viola (tracks 1, 2, 4, 5, 6, 9, 12, 13 and 16); cello (track 13)
- Luke Maurer – viola (tracks 1, 2, 3, 4, 5, 6, 7, 9, 10, 12, 13 and 16); cello (track 13)
- Carolyn Riley – viola (tracks 4 and 16)
- Jonah Sirota – viola (tracks 2, 4, 5, 6, 9, 12, 13 and 16); cello (track 13)
- Nadia Sirota – viola (track 6)
- David Walther – viola (tracks 2, 4, 5, 6, 9, 12, 13 and 16); cello (track 13)

Cello and low strings

- Nico Abondolo – contrabass recorder (track 6)
- Helen Altenbach – cello (tracks 2, 4, 5, 6, 9, 12 and 16)
- Jacob Braun – cello (tracks 1, 2, 3, 4, 5, 6, 7, 9, 10, 12, 15 and 16)
- Giovanna Clayton – cello (tracks 1, 2, 3, 5, 6, 7, 9, 10, 12, 15 and 16)
- Steve Dress – contrabass recorder (tracks 2, 4, 5, 6, 7, 9, 10, 12, 13 and 16)
- Daniel Foose – contrabass recorder (tracks 4 and 16)
- Vanessa Freebairn-Smith – cello (track 6)
- Ross Gasworth – cello (tracks 2, 4, 5, 6, 9, 12 and 16)
- Thomas Harte – contrabass recorder (tracks 2, 4, 5, 6, 7, 9, 10, 12, 13 and 16)
- Jory Herman – contrabass recorder (tracks 2, 4, 5, 9, 12, 13 and 16)
- Oscar Hidalgo – contrabass recorder (tracks 2, 4, 5, 6, 9, 12, 13 and 16)
- Paula Hochhalter – cello (tracks 1, 3, 6, 7, 10, 12 and 13)
- Dennis Karmazyn – cello (tracks 2, 4, 5, 6, 9, 12 and 16)
- Ben Lash – cello (tracks 2, 4, 5, 6, 9, 12 and 16)
- Geoff Osika – contrabass recorder (tracks 2, 4, 5, 6, 9, 12, 13 and 16)
- Stephanie Payne – contrabass recorder (track 6)
- Adam Peters – cello (tracks 3, 5, 6, 12 and 16)
- Ro Rowan – cello (tracks 2, 4, 5, 6, 9, 12 and 16)
- Sebastian Steinberg – contrabass recorder (tracks 6 and 12)
- Cameron Stone – cello (tracks 1, 2, 3, 4, 5, 6, 7, 9, 10, 12 and 16)
- Jacob Szekely – cello (track 6)
- Charlie Tyler – cello (tracks 4, 6 and 16)
- Michael Valerio – contrabass recorder (tracks 2, 4, 5, 6, 7, 9, 10, 12, 13, 15 and 16)

Woodwinds

- Julie Burkert – flute (tracks 2, 5, 8, 9, 12 and 16)
- Stuart Clark – clarinet (tracks 2, 5, 8, 9, 12 and 16)
- Rose Corrigan – bassoon (tracks 2, 5, 9, 12 and 16)
- Jeff Driskill – saxophone (tracks 2 and 3); flute (track 3); tenor saxophone (track 14)
- Steve Elson – saxophone (track 8)
- Don Foster – clarinet (tracks 2, 5, 8, 9, 12 and 16)
- Juan Gallegos – clarinet (tracks 2, 5, 6, 7, 9, 10, 12 and 16)
- Dan Higgins – saxophone (tracks 1, 2, 3, 7, 8 and 15); flute (tracks 2, 7, 10 and 14); clarinet (tracks 3, 7 and 10); alto saxophone (tracks 10 and 14)
- Rusty Higgins – alto saxophone (tracks 1 and 10); clarinet (tracks 7 and 10); flute (tracks 7 and 10); saxophone (tracks 7 and 15)
- Maxwell Kaplan – clarinet (track 3)
- Steven Kortyka – saxophone (tracks 4 and 16)
- Rong-huey Liu – oboe (track 8)
- Mark Lopeman – saxophone (track 8)
- Sal Lozano – tenor saxophone (tracks 1, 7, 9 and 10); flute (tracks 2 and 14); saxophone (tracks 2, 6, 7, 8 and 15); alto saxophone (tracks 12 and 14)
- Eric Marienthal – clarinet (tracks 2, 6 and 14); saxophone (tracks 2, 3 and 6); tenor saxophone (tracks 12 and 14)
- James Mason – saxophone (tracks 7 and 15); baritone saxophone (track 10)
- Jay Mason – baritone saxophone (track 1)
- William May – bassoon (track 2)
- Damian Montano – bassoon (tracks 2, 5, 9, 12 and 16)
- Jenni Olson – flute (tracks 2, 5, 9, 12 and 16)
- Anthony Parnther – bassoon (tracks 2, 5, 9, 12 and 16)
- Geri Rotella – flute (tracks 2, 5, 9, 12 and 16)
- Brian Scanlon – tenor saxophone (tracks 1 and 10); flute (track 3); saxophone (tracks 3, 7 and 15); clarinet (tracks 7 and 10)
- Jacob Scesney – saxophone (tracks 2, 3 and 6); flute (track 3); baritone saxophone (tracks 12 and 14)
- Ben Smolen – flute (tracks 2, 5, 9, 12 and 16)
- Nick Urata – clarinet and trumpet (track 3)
- Lara Wickes – oboe (track 3)
- William Wood – bassoon and contrabassoon (track 7)

Brass

- John Allred – trombone (track 8)
- Wayne Bergeron – trumpet (tracks 1, 2, 3, 6, 7, 8, 10, 12, 14 and 15)
- Laura Brenes – horn (tracks 5, 9, 10 and 16)
- Stewart Cole – trumpet (track 3)
- Blake Cooper – trombone (tracks 5, 9 and 16)
- Ryan DeWeese – trumpet (tracks 2 and 14)
- Ryan Dragon – trombone (tracks 1, 2, 6, 8, 10, 14 and 15)
- Dave Everson – horn (tracks 5 and 16)
- Katie Faraudo – horn (tracks 5, 9, 10 and 16)
- Dan Fornero – trumpet (tracks 1, 2, 3, 6, 12, 14 and 15)
- Craig Gosnell – trombone (tracks 1, 2, 3, 5, 6, 8, 9, 10, 12, 14, 15 and 16)
- Dylan Hart – horn (track 8)
- Thomas Hooten – trumpet (tracks 4, 5 and 16)
- Jamie Hovorka – trumpet (tracks 1, 8 and 15)
- Alex Iles – trombone (tracks 1, 3, 5, 9, 10, 15 and 16)
- Alan Kaplan – trombone (tracks 6 and 10)
- Jon-Erik Kellso – trumpet (track 8)
- Jon Lewis – trumpet (tracks 5 and 16)
- Tom Malone – trombone (track 8)
- Andy Martin – trombone (tracks 1, 2, 3, 6, 12, 14 and 15)
- Ido Meshulam – trombone (tracks 3, 5, 9 and 16)
- Jim Miller – trombone (tracks 5 and 16)
- Brian Newman – trumpet (track 15)
- Adedeji Ogunfolu – horn (tracks 5, 8, 9, 10 and 16)
- Teag Reaves – horn (track 8)
- Amy Jo Rhine – horn (tracks 5, 9, 10 and 16)
- Dan Rosenboom – trumpet (tracks 5 and 16)
- Rob Schaer – trumpet (tracks 1 and 15)
- Michael Stever – trumpet (tracks 2 and 14)
- Doug Tornquist – tuba (tracks 2, 5, 9, 14 and 16)
- Francisco Torres – trombone (tracks 2 and 14)
- Kaylet Torrez – horn (tracks 5, 10 and 16)
- Adam Wolf – horn (tracks 5, 10 and 16)

Production and technical

- Jeff Atmajian – arrangements (tracks 2, 5, 6, 9 and 12)
- Daniel "Chief" Van Billiard – assistant recording engineering (track 15)
- Bryce Bordone – assistant mixing (track 15)
- David Campbell – additional production, production and arrangements
- David Chase – arrangements (track 8)
- Joe Dougherty – additional engineering (track 15)
- George Drakoulias – executive production
- Lady Gaga – production, executive production and vocal production
- Serban Ghenea – mixing (track 15)
- Lena Glikson-Nezhelskaya – arrangements (tracks 3 and 6)
- Hildur Guðnadóttir – arrangements (track 4)
- Noah Hubbell – engineering
- Patrick Hundley – assistant recording engineering (track 15)
- Eyvind Kang – arrangements (track 9)
- Paul Lamalfa – vocal engineering (track 15)
- Emily Lazar – mastering
- Stewart Lerman – production (track 8)
- Mark Lopeman – arrangements (track 8)
- Brian Newman – arrangements (tracks 4 and 14)
- Brendan O'Brien – mixing (tracks 1–14 and 16)
- Todd Phillips – executive production
- Joaquin Phoenix – production and executive production
- Randall Poster – executive production
- Kaleb Rollins – vocal mixing (track 15)
- Jason Ruder – production, executive production and arrangements
- Alex Smith – arrangements (track 9)
- Nick Urata – additional production and arrangements

== Charts ==
Chart performance
Chart (2024)	Peak position
Austrian Albums (Ö3 Austria)	10
Belgian Albums (Ultratop Flanders)	51
Belgian Albums (Ultratop Wallonia)	29
Croatian International Albums (HDU)	40
French Albums (SNEP)	39
German Albums (Offizielle Top 100)	43
Irish Compilations (IRMA)	6
Italian Albums (FIMI)	92
Japanese Hot Albums (Billboard Japan)	86
Polish Physical Albums (ZPAV)	62
Portuguese Albums (AFP)	59
Spanish Albums (PROMUSICAE)	44
Swiss Albums (Schweizer Hitparade)	21
UK Compilation Albums (Official Charts)	9
UK Jazz & Blues Albums (Official Charts)	2
UK Soundtrack Albums (Official Charts)	1
US Top Album Sales (Billboard)	23
US Soundtrack Albums (Billboard)	6

== Release history ==
Date	Region	Format	Ref.
October 4, 2024	Worldwide	Digital download; Streaming	
October 4, 2024	Various	CD; LP	
October 9, 2024	Japan	CD	

== See also ==
- Joker: Folie à Deux (score)
- Harlequin (Lady Gaga album)
