= Harlequin (Lady Gaga album) =

2024 album by Lady Gaga

- Standard cover

Soundtrack album by Lady Gaga
- Released: September 27, 2024
- Genres: Traditional pop; jazz
- Length: 41:27
- Label: Interscope
- Producers: Lady Gaga; BloodPop; David Campbell; Benjamin Rice; Jason Ruder

Lady Gaga chronology
Top Gun: Maverick (2022)	Harlequin (2024)	Joker: Folie à Deux (2024)

Alternative cover
- Online store exclusive cover

Harlequin is a soundtrack album by American singer-songwriter Lady Gaga, released on September 27, 2024, by Interscope Records. It was produced by Gaga, alongside BloodPop, David Campbell, Jason Ruder, and Benjamin Rice. The record is musically inspired by and includes alternate takes of songs from the soundtrack for the musical thriller film Joker: Folie à Deux (2024), in which Gaga portrays the DC Comics character Harley Quinn. Gaga stated that Harlequin serves as a "companion album" to the film, while some publications have referred to it as a soundtrack album, alongside the film's official soundtrack released a week later. Thematically, however, critics described Harlequin as a concept album about Harley Quinn, depicting the supervillain from Gaga's perspective.

The album consists primarily of covers of American popular standards, alongside two original compositions by Gaga. Musically rooted in traditional pop and jazz, it incorporates elements of rock, funk and gospel, building on her earlier collaborations with American jazz singer Tony Bennett on Cheek to Cheek (2014) and Love for Sale (2021). In promotion of Harlequin, she released a video shot in the Louvre, featuring her rendition of "The Joker", and gave a televised performance of original song "Happy Mistake". Days after the album's release, she performed the entire record during an intimate show at The Belasco in Los Angeles, which was later commemorated in the concert film Lady Gaga in Harlequin Live: One Night Only, released in December 2025.

Harlequin received generally favorable reviews from music critics, who praised Gaga's vocals, theatrical performances, and interpretations of the jazz standards, although some questioned the song choices and their connection to Harley Quinn. The album was nominated for Best Traditional Pop Vocal Album at the 68th Annual Grammy Awards. Commercially, it reached the top ten in Austria, France, Germany, Scotland, Spain, and Switzerland, and the top 20 in several other countries, including the United Kingdom and the United States. It also topped the US Jazz Albums chart, becoming Gaga's third number-one album on the ranking.

== Development ==
Following the completion of The Chromatica Ball (2022), Lady Gaga took a step back from social media and promotional activities while she focused on preparing her role as Harleen "Lee" Quinzel (Harley Quinn) opposite Joaquin Phoenix as Arthur Fleck (the Joker) in the American musical thriller film Joker: Folie à Deux (2024). In a lengthy Instagram post made on June 16, 2023, Gaga shared that she had been spending alone time "healing" while editing her concert film Gaga Chromatica Ball (2024), filming Joker: Folie à Deux, and creating music for a "special project". Throughout the rest of the year and into 2024, she occasionally teased upcoming music via social media, sharing photos from within the studios where she was working and offering insights into the process.

At the film's red carpet premiere in London, England, on September 25, 2024, Gaga explained that she created Harlequin because she wanted to continue exploring Lee after filming Joker: Folie à Deux. She said the album's diverse musical styles reflected the character's complexity and her desire to define herself on her own terms. Harlequin marked Gaga's first album of jazz standards without Tony Bennett, following their collaborations on Cheek to Cheek (2014) and Love for Sale (2021). Gaga said she felt Bennett's presence throughout the recording process and believed that, although he was not fond of rock and roll, he would have appreciated her experimentation with the genre and her willingness to take musical risks.

Gaga and her fiancé, Michael Polansky, conceived Harlequin together, marking their first musical project as collaborators. According to Polansky, discussions about the parallels between Lee's divided identity and Gaga's public persona encouraged them to book studio time. He told the Associated Press that jazz formed the basis of the album, but wanted the songs to fit together through their energy and personality, regardless of genre. Gaga recalled discussing with Polansky how Harley Quinn might seek to benefit from the Joker's fame or take revenge on him for breaking her heart. They used these ideas to develop the album around the character.

During the filming of Joker: Folie à Deux, Gaga adopted a less polished singing style to portray Lee, departing from her usual vocal technique. For Harlequin, Gaga combined her usual singing style with Lee's voice and tried vocal techniques she had not used before. She cited "That's Entertainment" as an example, describing its opening as having a "childlike immaturity", reminiscent of a teenager performing in a school play, before shifting to a softer, "extremely nostalgic" delivery. Gaga also described the vocals on "Happy Mistake" as unusually vulnerable and said that experimenting with different genres was part of the creative freedom she enjoyed while recording the album.

== Production and composition ==
=== Production ===
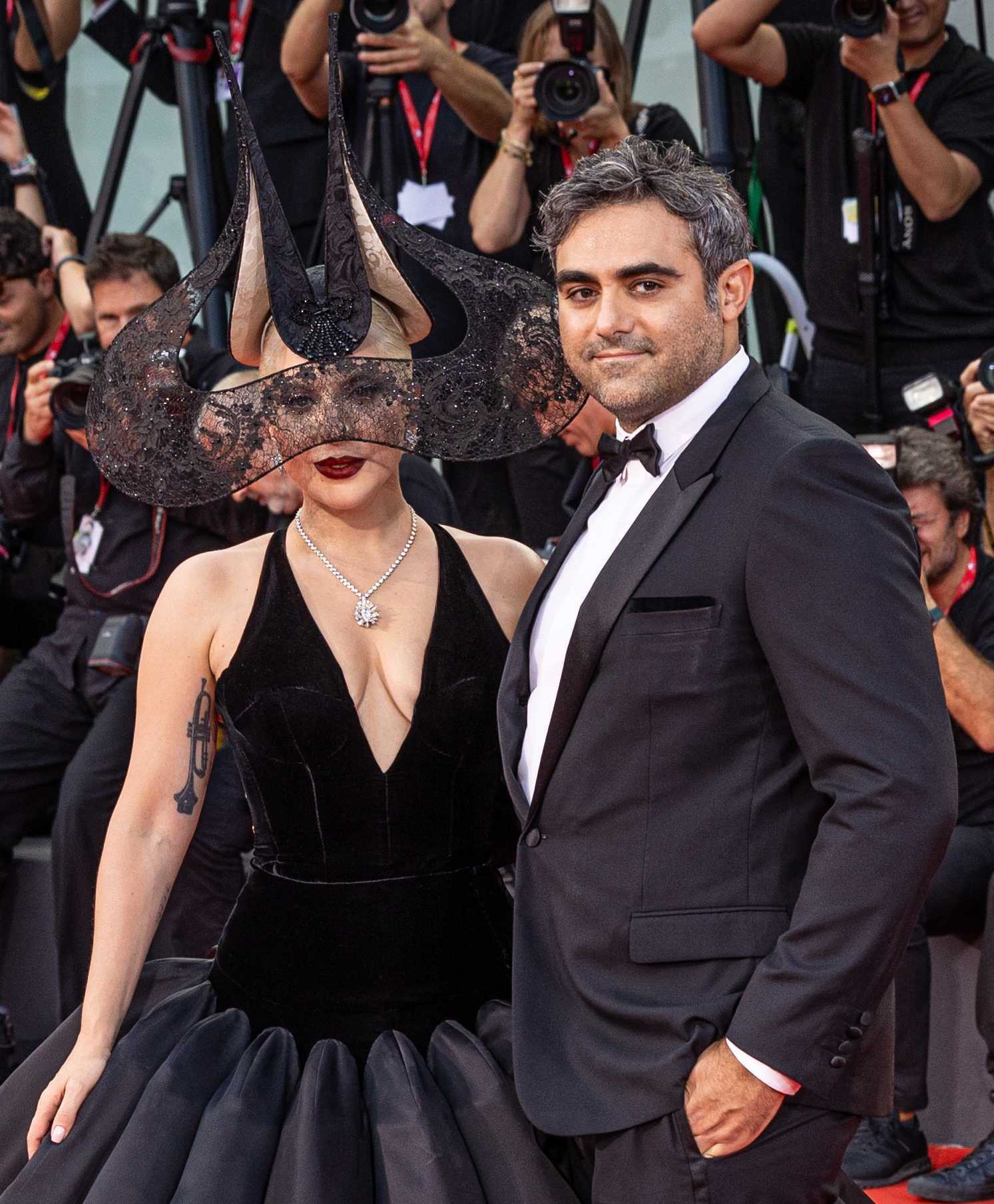
Gaga and Michael Polansky, both co-executive producers and co-writers on Harlequin

Harlequin was recorded during summer 2024 while Gaga was completing her Jazz & Piano residency in Las Vegas. Her accompanying musicians, including members of the rhythm and brass sections, spent approximately six hours in the recording studio before residency performances. Recording sessions took place at Dragonfly Creek Recording Studio and Shangri-La in Malibu, California, The Sound Factory at the Palms and Studio A in Las Vegas, Nevada, and EastWest Studios in Los Angeles.

Gaga co-produced the album's first 12 tracks with Benjamin Rice, who also worked as a recording engineer. BloodPop additionally co-produced "Happy Mistake", while David Campbell and Jason Ruder co-produced the closing track, "That's Life", with Gaga. Campbell also arranged and conducted the latter song, and Serban Ghenea mixed the album. Gaga and Polansky served as the album's co-executive producers. They were also credited as co-writers on four reworked standards: Good Morning", "Get Happy", "Oh, When the Saints", and "If My Friends Could See Me Now. The pair also selected the songs for the album together.

The sessions featured a recurring group of musicians, including trumpeter Brian Newman, guitarist Tim Stewart, bassist Daniel Foose, saxophonist Steve Kortyka, drummer Donald Barrett, and pianist and organist Alex Smith. Several were also credited as co-arrangers alongside Gaga, Rice and Polansky. Gaga said she prepared for recording standards by singing them many times beforehand. Discussions with the band following Newman's late-night performances in Las Vegas introduced a shared interest in surf punk, influencing their approach to guitar arrangements. Gaga also recalled suggesting that Rice use trash cans as drums, introducing unconventional percussion to the recordings.

=== Songs ===
==== Covers ====
The album opens with "Good Morning", originally performed by Judy Garland and Mickey Rooney in the 1939 film Babes in Arms. Gaga's rendition adds a doo-wop introduction and a rewritten verse referring to sleeping inmates and a prison warden, accompanied by an upbeat big band arrangement of brass, piano and double bass. "Get Happy (2024)", originally introduced by Ruth Etting in the 1930 Broadway revue The Nine-Fifteen Revue, was later performed by Garland in the film Summer Stock (1950). Gaga emphasizes the song's spiritual undertones in an interpretation that Vulture compared to Ella Fitzgerald's, with a lively horn section and bent guitar notes. She also altered the lyrics to refer to Arthur Fleck, explaining that the changes contrast his violent actions with the song's celebratory mood.

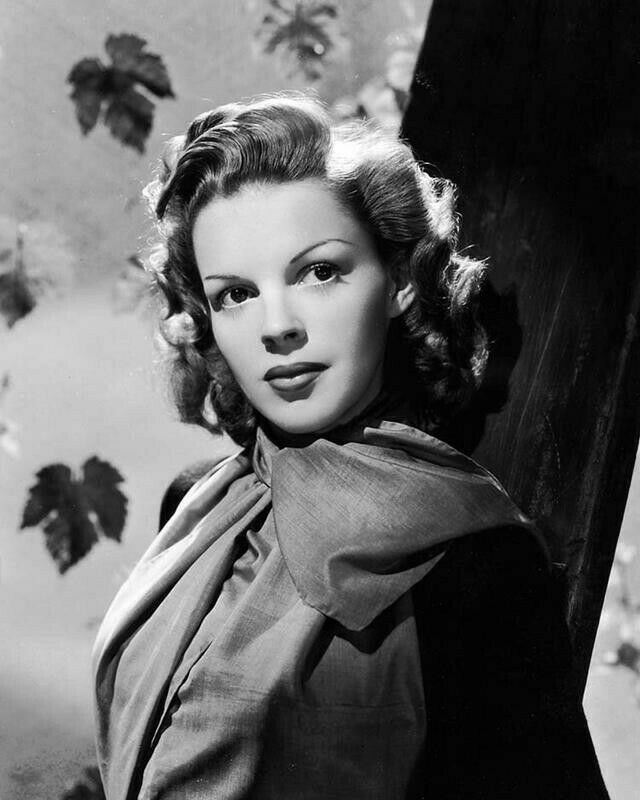
Judy Garland performed "Good Morning" in Babes in Arms (1939) and "Get Happy" in Summer Stock (1950), both covered by Gaga on Harlequin.

"Oh, When the Saints", adapted from the traditional spiritual "When the Saints Go Marching In", sets the familiar melody against a funk beat, with several key changes, an electric guitar solo and an extended big-band ending. On the following track, "World on a String", Gaga takes the 1932 standard in a rock-influenced direction. Her restrained singing is accompanied by tremolo guitar, organ and reverberating drums, some of which were recorded on trash cans. Thomas H. Green of The Arts Desk likened Gaga's smoky vocals on "World on a String" to those of Amy Winehouse. On "If My Friends Could See Me Now", from the 1966 musical Sweet Charity, Gaga initially sings over an acoustic guitar before the arrangement gives way to brass, scat singing and a much stronger vocal delivery. "That's Entertainment!", from the 1953 film The Band Wagon, follows a similar pattern, beginning with restrained vocals before building to a more forceful performance. Gaga takes a quieter approach to "Smile", which originated as an instrumental composed by Charlie Chaplin for Modern Times (1936). Her version features piano, breathy singing and muted brass, with descending guitar notes and a spoken passage in French near the end.

"The Joker", originally from the musical The Roar of the Greasepaint – The Smell of the Crowd and recorded by Shirley Bassey in 1968, is performed as a rock song, with distorted guitars, heavy drums and growling vocals. Gaga said she and Polansky wanted the song to express Harley Quinn's defiance and her desire to assume the Joker's identity. On the gospel-influenced "Gonna Build a Mountain", from the 1961 musical Stop the World – I Want to Get Off, Gaga's singing becomes increasingly forceful, culminating in an extended passage of belting. Her recording of "Close to You", written by Burt Bacharach and Hal David and popularized by the Carpenters, replaces the group's piano-led arrangement with a walking bass line, rhythmic percussion and prominent trumpet. The album closes with "That's Life", a standard popularized by Frank Sinatra. Gaga sings the verses in a style similar to Sinatra's, before adopting a more powerful vocal delivery.

==== Original songs ====
In addition to its covers, Harlequin includes two original compositions by Gaga. "Folie à Deux", written solely by her for Joker: Folie à Deux, is an orchestral waltz featuring sweeping strings and choral harmonies. Vulture described it as Gaga's first original song in a traditional pop style, comparing its arrangement to classic Hollywood music and circus sounds. Gaga alternates between different vocal timbres, while the arrangement incorporates deliberately discordant notes, contrasting its romantic atmosphere with a sense of unease. The lyrics portray Harley Quinn's obsessive attachment to the Joker, with the narrator imagining a paradise where they can be together despite others considering their love irrational. The waltz's strings and choir begin to fracture toward the end of the song.

"Happy Mistake"
A 23-second sample of "Happy Mistake", showcasing its acoustic guitar accompaniment and Gaga's upper-register vocal delivery during the chorus.

The other original song, "Happy Mistake", was co-written by Gaga and BloodPop, and was created specifically for the album, not the film. It is a power ballad which blends acoustic guitar, reverberation, and subtle electronic textures. Gaga begins the song singing softly, gradually building to a more forceful vocal performance that reaches her upper register. Critics likened it to "Shallow" (2018) and the more personal material on Joanne (2016). The lyrics deal with the loneliness Gaga experienced as a celebrity, with references to makeup, broken mirrors, and performing for others. Gaga told Entertainment Weekly that she had spent years playing a troubled version of herself, eventually losing touch with who she really was. She compared this experience to Harley Quinn's relationship with the Joker and said that happiness had become something she could only stumble upon by accident.

==== Comparison with the film soundtrack ====
Several songs on Harlequin also appear on the Joker: Folie à Deux soundtrack, though their arrangements and vocal performances differ. Gaga explained that while she deliberately restrained her singing technique for the film, Harlequin allowed her to alternate between the voice of her character, Lee, and her own vocal style. Chris DeVille of Stereogum described the film soundtrack's interpretations of the shared standards as generally darker. The soundtrack also includes duets between Gaga and Joaquin Phoenix, alongside Phoenix's solo performances.

On the soundtrack, Phoenix performs "The Joker" as a dark, jazz-arranged number, contrasting with Gaga's guitar-driven rock interpretation on Harlequin. Gaga's original composition "Folie à Deux" also appears in different arrangements. The film version features a carousel-like arrangement combining Hildur Guðnadóttir's strings with Brian Newman's jazz quintet, while the Harlequin rendition is more danceable. The film's rendition of "World on a String" features rougher vocals and increasingly dissonant accompaniment, contrasting with the more restrained performance on Harlequin. Similarly, the album's upbeat interpretation of "Close to You" differs from the film's somber duet, while the two recordings of "That's Life" have similar arrangements, with a more forceful vocal performance on the soundtrack.

== Release and artwork ==
Gaga posted an image on September 20, 2024, containing a "grainy" red background with white text reading "I'm ready for my interview". She later uploaded four more "cryptic" images on Instagram, three of which included sound, prompting speculation among fans that the posts were related to her seventh studio album or Joker: Folie à Deux. On September 23, billboards displaying "LG 6.5" and "LG Six.Five" appeared in New York City and Los Angeles, further fueling speculation about a new release. On September 24, Gaga revealed the album to be titled Harlequin and shared the cover artwork via Instagram. In the same post, she referred to the project as a "companion album" to Joker: Folie à Deux, shared the tracklist on the back of a milk carton, and linked to pre-order the album's CD, vinyl, and digital formats on her web store. Gaga explained that she designated the project "LG6.5" because it was not her next pop studio album, but a release that occupied an intermediate position and blurred the boundaries of pop music. She considered it both a Lady Gaga record and an extension of her portrayal of Harley Quinn. Harlequin was released on September 27, 2024.

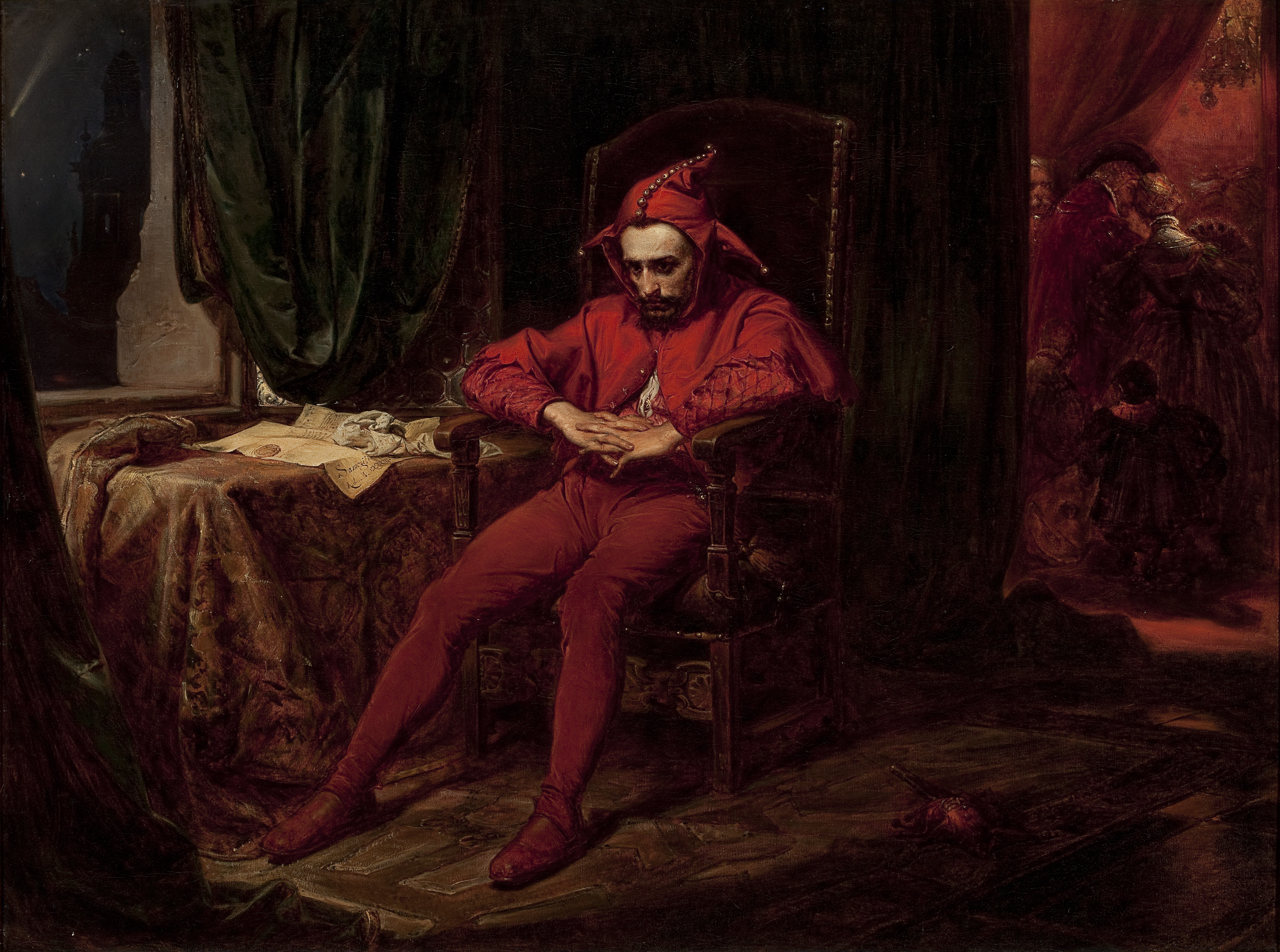
The 1862 painting Stańczyk by Polish painter Jan Matejko appears on the back cover of the album's alternate vinyl edition.

The album's cover and accompanying photographs were taken by London-based photographer Scarlett Carlos Clarke. Gaga later revealed that the photoshoot took place in a run-down apartment in Las Vegas while she was finishing the album. The setting reminded her of her early years living in an apartment on New York's Lower East Side, where she had first met some of the musicians involved in the record nearly two decades earlier. The standard cover depicts Gaga standing in a shower with orange hair, wearing a white dress and a flotation device around her neck, while her makeup runs down her face from the water. The artwork was shortlisted for the 2024 Best Art Vinyl award, which recognizes achievements in record sleeve design.

An alternate cover used for an exclusive vinyl sold on Gaga's web store shows her lying on a bed in a messy bedroom, facing the ceiling. The photograph contains several references to her earlier career, including a picture of frequent collaborator Tony Bennett; the disco ball bra she wore in the music video for "Just Dance"; and a broken VHS tape labeled "Joanne World Tour". The back cover of the alternate vinyl edition features another photograph of the bedroom, with the 1862 painting Stańczyk by Polish painter Jan Matejko hanging on the wall. Its inclusion attracted attention in Poland, with the National Museum in Warsaw, which houses the painting, expressing surprise at its appearance and joking that there was "only one real Joker". A second alternate cover depicts Gaga standing on a bed in a white top, with the album's title written in red across the photograph. The artwork was used for limited-edition vinyl releases.

== Promotion ==
External videos
- A promotional video of Lady Gaga wandering around the Louvre, featuring her rendition of "The Joker" from Harlequin on YouTube

On September 25, 2024, Gaga announced via her social media a collaboration with the Louvre Museum in promotion for the album. The post featured an 80-second preview of "The Joker" set to an accompanying visual that shows Gaga exploring the museum at night. Towards the end of the clip, she uses red lipstick to draw a Joker-inspired grin on the Mona Lisa. The clip also promoted the "Figures Du Fou" exhibition that opened at the Louvre on October 16, 2024.

After the premiere of Joker: Folie A Deux in London, Gaga hosted a "secret" intimate listening party where she played Harlequin from beginning to end and also danced and sang with her fans. On October 1, 2024, she appeared on Jimmy Kimmel Live! in a white harlequin ensemble and performed "Happy Mistake". Consequence's Eddie Fu said it was "another case of Gaga's live performance topping the studio recording", while Stereogum's Tom Breihan felt she gave the track "the full stadium treatment".

=== Concert film ===
In December 2025, Gaga announced Lady Gaga in Harlequin Live: One Night Only, a concert film featuring a complete performance of Harlequin. Filmed on September 30, 2024, at The Belasco in Los Angeles before a small audience of fans, the production was executive produced by Gaga and Michael Polansky, who also oversaw its creative direction alongside mtla.studio. The film premiered at the Grammy Museum in Los Angeles on December 18, 2025, before being released on Gaga's YouTube channel on December 24. The production design drew inspiration from the album's alternative artwork, recreating its disheveled apartment setting with crooked window blinds, dim lighting, and an unmade mattress. Critics reacted positively to Gaga's compelling, high-intensity performance and the renewed conviction she brought to her Harlequin material.

== Critical reception ==
Professional ratings
Aggregate scores
Source	Rating
AnyDecentMusic?	6.8/10
Metacritic	73/100
Review scores
Source	Rating
AllMusic	4/5 stars
Clash	7/10
The Daily Telegraph	3/5 stars
Financial Times	3/5 stars
The Guardian	3/5 stars
The Independent	3/5 stars
The Irish Times	4/5 stars
Rolling Stone	3.5/5 stars
Slant Magazine	3.5/5 stars
Sputnikmusic	4.2/5

Harlequin received positive reviews from critics. At Metacritic, which assigns a weighted mean rating out of 100 to reviews from mainstream critics, Harlequin received a score of 73 based on ten reviews, indicating "generally favorable reviews". Aggregator AnyDecentMusic? compiled eleven reviews and gave the album an average of 6.8 out of 10, based on their assessment of the critical consensus.

Many critics praised the lively, uninhibited mood of Harlequin and Gaga's theatrical performances. Neil Z. Yeung of AllMusic labelled it a fresh, "no-skips effort" in Gaga's discography. Robin Murray from Clash described Harlequin as "unique, fun, and wildly over-the-top", and dubbed Gaga a "360 artist for the modern era." Rolling Stone's Rob Sheffield praised Gaga's personality and theatrical delivery, particularly on "The Joker" and "That's Life", but found some covers less effective outside the context of the film. He considered "Happy Mistake" the album's strongest track, commending its exploration of the parallels between Gaga's public persona and Harley Quinn. Sputnikmusic's Dakota West Foss viewed Harlequin as a return to Gaga's eccentric, uninhibited style, praising the exuberant arrangements of "Good Morning" and "Oh, When the Saints" alongside the tenderness of quieter tracks such as "Smile" and "Happy Mistake". Tony Clayton-Lea of The Irish Times praised Gaga for revitalizing familiar standards by combining the theatricality of show tunes with Harley Quinn's unpredictability, singling out the blues-influenced rendition of "Oh, When the Saints" and the contrasting intimacy of "Smile" and "Close to You".

Other reviewers focused on the album's narrative and Gaga's vocal performances. Mary Siroky of Consequence viewed Harlequin as a story in three acts. In her interpretation, the album begins with confidence and romance, takes a darker turn, and ends on a note of recovery. She considered "That's Entertainment" as a turning point in this progression, although she found "The Joker" too heavy-handed in its treatment of the character. Matthew Dwyer of PopMatters interpreted Harlequin as an exploration of Gaga's relationship with fame and her public persona, arguing that its reinterpretations of classic songs reinforced her identity as a performer. He considered "That's Entertainment" central to the album's themes, emphasizing the relationship between Gaga's personal identity and her theatrical performances. Sal Cinquemani of Slant Magazine felt that Harlequin provided an outlet for Gaga's theatricality, praising the grit of her rendition of "The Joker" and the powerful vocals of "Gonna Build a Mountain", although he criticized her tendency toward exaggerated vocal performances and found "Close to You" lacking in vulnerability. Melissa Ruggieri of USA Today praised both original songs, particularly Gaga's vocal performance on "Happy Mistake", which grows more intense as the song progresses. She also commended Gaga's phrasing on "That's Life".

Other critics were less enthusiastic. Thomas H. Green of The Arts Desk praised Gaga's vocal range and the energy of the arrangements, singling out "The Joker" and "That's Life", although he found several covers unremarkable. He also commended the two original compositions for fitting naturally alongside the established standards. Ludovic Hunter-Tilney of the Financial Times regarded the material as familiar territory following Gaga's collaborations with Tony Bennett, but commended her singing and the theatrical interpretations of several songs. Neil McCormick of The Daily Telegraph praised Gaga's powerful vocals and ability to bring her own personality to familiar jazz standards, although he found the original composition "Folie à Deux" overly sentimental. Michael Cragg of The Guardian likened Harlequin to a recorded version of Gaga's Jazz & Piano residency, praising her enthusiasm and performances of "World on a String" and "The Joker". However, he criticized the predictable song choices and considered the album a minor addition to her discography that served largely as a prelude to her next musical project. Helen Brown of The Independent admired the performances and arrangements but felt that most of the covers did little to evoke Harley Quinn's darker personality. She identified "The Joker" as the album's strongest track, while also noting the unsettling interpretation of "Smile". Bruno Lesprit of Le Monde felt the record was "lacking any clear musical direction". In a 2026 ranking of Gaga's albums for Spin, Al Shipley placed it second to last, writing that it "feels a bit more like a collection of vocal exercises than a complete artistic statement."

== Commercial performance ==
In the United States, Harlequin debuted at number 20 on the Billboard 200, earning 25,000 album-equivalent units in its first week, including 16,000 pure album sales. The album recorded the largest opening week for a jazz release since Gaga's collaboration with Tony Bennett, Love for Sale (2021), which debuted with 41,000 units. Its songs accumulated 11.34 million on-demand streams, the highest first-week streaming total for a jazz album since Laufey's Bewitched (2023). Harlequin also topped both the Jazz Albums and Traditional Jazz Albums charts, becoming Gaga's third album to lead both rankings, following Cheek to Cheek (2014) and Love for Sale. In Canada, it reached number 66 on the Canadian Albums Chart.

In the United Kingdom, Harlequin debuted at number 59 on the UK Albums Chart before rising to number 11 following the release of its physical editions. It also reached number one on the UK Jazz & Blues Albums chart. Elsewhere in Europe, the album peaked at number four in Scotland and Switzerland, number five in Spain, number eight in Austria, and number nine in Germany. In France, it reached number ten on the albums chart and topped the Jazz Albums chart. It also entered the top 20 in Croatia, Italy, Poland, Portugal, Sweden, and Belgium's Wallonia region. In Hungary, the album reached number eight on the physical albums chart, while lower positions were recorded in Greece, Finland, Ireland, Belgium's Flanders region, and the Netherlands.

In Japan, Harlequin reached number 39 on the Oricon Albums Chart and number 37 on both the Oricon Digital Albums chart and the Billboard Japan Hot Albums chart. It also peaked at number 40 on the Australian Albums Chart and number 28 on New Zealand's Official Top 40 Albums chart.

== Accolades ==
Harlequin was nominated for Best Traditional Pop Vocal Album at the 68th Annual Grammy Awards, Gaga's third nomination in the category following Cheek to Cheek (2014) and Love for Sale (2021), both of which won. The award went to Laufey's A Matter of Time.

Organization	Year	Category	Result	Ref.
Grammy Awards	2026	Best Traditional Pop Vocal Album	Nominated	
Hungarian Music Awards	2025	Foreign Classic Pop-Rock Album or Record of the Year	Nominated	

== Track listing ==
Harlequin track listing
No.	Title	Writer(s)	Producer(s)	Length
1.	"Good Morning"	Nacio Brown; Arthur Freed; Stefani Germanotta; Michael Polansky	Lady Gaga; Benjamin Rice	2:47
2.	"Get Happy (2024)"	Harold Arlen; Ted Koehler; Germanotta; Polansky	Gaga; Rice	3:12
3.	"Oh, When the Saints"	Traditional; Germanotta; Polansky	Gaga; Rice	3:43
4.	"World on a String"	Arlen; Koehler	Gaga; Rice	2:37
5.	"If My Friends Could See Me Now"	Cy Coleman; Dorothy Fields; Germanotta; Polansky	Gaga; Rice	2:44
6.	"That's Entertainment"	Howard Dietz; Arthur Schwartz	Gaga; Rice	4:10
7.	"Smile"	Charlie Chaplin; John Turner; Geoffrey Parsons	Gaga; Rice	3:42
8.	"The Joker"	Leslie Bricusse; Anthony Newley	Gaga; Rice	2:52
9.	"Folie à Deux"	Germanotta	Gaga; Rice	3:00
10.	"Gonna Build a Mountain"	Bricusse; Newley	Gaga; Rice	2:52
11.	"Close to You"	Burt Bacharach; Hal David	Gaga; Rice	2:44
12.	"Happy Mistake"	Germanotta; Michael Tucker	Gaga; BloodPop; Rice	4:08
13.	"That's Life"	Dean Kay; Kelly Gordon	Gaga^{[p]}; David Campbell; Jason Ruder	3:04
Total length:				41:27

=== Note ===
- ^{^[p]} signifies a primary and vocal producer.

== Personnel ==
Credits adapted from album liner notes.

Musicians

- Lady Gaga – vocals
- Tim Stewart – guitar (tracks 1–8, 10–12)
- Steve Kortyka – saxophone (tracks 1–7, 9, 10), background vocals (1); conductor, piano (2, 11)
- Daniel Foose – bass guitar (tracks 1–5, 7–12), background vocals (1), double bass (6)
- Alex Smith – piano (tracks 1, 5, 6, 9), background vocals (1), organ (2–5, 10–13), Wurlitzer organ (4, 5)
- Donald Barrett – drums (tracks 1–3, 5–7, 9–11, 13), background vocals (1)
- Brian Newman – trumpet (tracks 1–3, 5–7, 9–11, 13), background vocals (1)
- Ashley Wigginton – additional vocals (track 1)
- Seth Fetzer – additional vocals (track 1)
- Tim Brooks – additional vocals (track 1)
- Tyler Wigginton – additional vocals (track 1)
- Adrienne Woods – cello (tracks 2, 6, 9, 11)
- Moonlight Tran – cello (tracks 2, 6, 9, 11)
- Adam Schroeder – saxophone (tracks 2, 6, 11), bass clarinet (9)
- Erick Tewalt – saxophone (tracks 2, 6, 11), clarinet (9)
- Rick Keller – saxophone (tracks 2, 6, 11), clarinet (9)
- Rob Mader – saxophone (tracks 2, 6, 9, 11)
- Curt Miller – trombone (tracks 2, 6, 9, 11)
- Isrea Butler – trombone (tracks 2, 6, 9, 11)
- Kirby Galbraith – trombone (tracks 2, 6, 9, 11)
- Dan Falcone – trumpet (tracks 2, 6, 9, 11)
- Gil Kaupp – trumpet (tracks 2, 6, 9, 11)
- Jason Levi – trumpet (tracks 2, 6, 9, 11)
- John Pollock – viola (tracks 2, 6, 9, 11)
- Tianna Heppner – viola (tracks 2, 6, 9, 11)
- Lauren Cordell – violin (tracks 2, 6, 9, 11)
- Mark Cargill – violin (tracks 2, 6, 9, 11)
- Naoko Taniguchi – violin (tracks 2, 6, 9, 11)
- Nicole Garcia – violin (tracks 2, 6, 9, 11)
- Rahmaan Phillip – violin (tracks 2, 6, 9, 11)
- Rebecca Sabine – violin (tracks 2, 6, 9, 11)
- Shigeru Logan – violin (tracks 2, 6, 9, 11)
- Nathan Tanouye – trombone (tracks 2, 9, 11)
- Bethany Mennemeyer – violin (tracks 2, 9, 11)
- Jacob Scesney – saxophone (tracks 2, 11)
- Tom DeLibero – trumpet (tracks 2, 11)
- Benjamin Rice – drums (tracks 4, 5, 8), percussion (4, 10, 12), guitar (12)
- Sal Lozano – saxophone (tracks 6, 13), flute (9)
- Rashawn Ross – trumpet (tracks 6, 9)
- Michael Bearden – conductor, piano (track 6)
- David Phillippus – trombone (track 6)
- Juliette Jones – violin (track 6)
- Brandon Lamonte Hawkins – additional vocals (track 9)
- Chanel White – additional vocals (track 9)
- Christopher Williams – additional vocals (track 9)
- Ciara Green – additional vocals (track 9)
- Darius Wright – additional vocals (track 9)
- Elyse Branch Clardy – additional vocals (track 9)
- Jadah Cheri Ellis – additional vocals (track 9)
- Jon Morgan – additional vocals (track 9)
- LaToya Walker – additional vocals (track 9)
- Leslie Stackhouse – additional vocals (track 9)
- Shyra Adamson – additional vocals (track 9)
- Skye Dee Miles – additional vocals (track 9)
- Torin Derek – additional vocals (track 9)
- Giovanna Clayton – cello (track 13)
- Jacob Braun – cello (track 13)
- David Campbell – conductor, piano (track 13)
- Michael Valerio – contrabass recorder (track 13)
- Brian Scanlon – saxophone (track 13)
- Dan Higgins – saxophone (track 13)
- James Mason – saxophone (track 13)
- Rusty Higgins – saxophone (track 13)
- Alex Iles – trombone (track 13)
- Andrew Martin – trombone (track 13)
- Craig Gosnell – trombone (track 13)
- Ryan Dragon – trombone (track 13)
- Dan Fornero – trumpet (track 13)
- Jamie Hovorka – trumpet (track 13)
- Rob Schaer – trumpet (track 13)
- Wayne Bergeron – trumpet (track 13)
- Matt Funes – viola (track 13)
- Zach Dellinger – viola (track 13)
- Ana Landaurer – violin (track 13)
- Ben Jacobson – violin (track 13)
- Charlie Bisharat – violin (track 13)
- Eun-Mee Ahn – violin (track 13)
- Kerenza Peacock – violin (track 13)
- Maya Magub – violin (track 13)
- Phillip Levy – violin (track 13)
- Songa Lee – violin (track 13)
- Tereza Stanislav – violin (track 13)
- Ashley Levin – vocals (track 13)
- Meloney Collins – vocals (track 13)
- Sara Mann – vocals (track 13)

Technical

- Emily Lazar – mastering
- Serban Ghenea – mixing
- Benjamin Rice – engineering (tracks 1–12), arrangement (3, 5, 7, 8, 10–12)
- David Boucher – engineering (tracks 1, 5–7, 11)
- Kevin Harp – engineering (tracks 2–5, 7–12)
- Noah Hubbell – engineering (track 13)
- Kaleb Rollins – vocal mixing (track 13)
- Paul Lamalfa – vocal engineering (track 13)
- Joe Dougherty – additional engineering
- Bryce Bordone – mixing assistance
- Daniel "Chief" Van Billiard – engineering assistance
- Patrick Hundley – engineering assistance
- Bella Corich – engineering assistance (tracks 1, 5, 7, 11)
- Miguel Lara – engineering assistance (tracks 1, 5, 7, 11)
- Josh Connolly – engineering assistance (track 6)
- Alex Smith – arrangement (tracks 1, 3–7, 9–12)
- Steve Kortyka – arrangement (tracks 2, 3, 5, 7, 10, 11)
- Lady Gaga – arrangement (tracks 3–5, 7, 8, 10–12)
- Daniel Foose – arrangement (tracks 3–5, 7, 8, 10–12)
- Michael Polansky – arrangement (tracks 3–5, 7, 8, 10, 11)
- Tim Stewart – arrangement (tracks 3–5, 7, 8, 10–12)
- Donald Barrett – arrangement (tracks 3, 5, 7, 10)
- Brian Newman – arrangement (tracks 3, 5, 7, 10)
- Danny Jonokuchi – arrangement (track 6)
- David Campbell – arrangement (track 13)

== Charts ==
=== Weekly charts ===
Chart performance
Chart (2024)	Peak position
Australian Albums (ARIA)	40
Austrian Albums (Ö3 Austria)	8
Belgian Albums (Ultratop Flanders)	65
Belgian Albums (Ultratop Wallonia)	20
Canadian Albums (Billboard)	66
Croatian International Albums (HDU)	11
Dutch Albums (Album Top 100)	71
Finnish Albums (Suomen virallinen lista)	43
French Albums (SNEP)	10
French Jazz Albums (SNEP)	1
German Albums (Offizielle Top 100)	9
Greek Albums (IFPI)	25
Hungarian Physical Albums (MAHASZ)	8
Irish Albums (IRMA)	55
Italian Albums (FIMI)	12
Japanese Albums (Oricon)	39
Japanese Digital Albums (Oricon)	37
Japanese Hot Albums (Billboard Japan)	37
Lithuanian Albums (AGATA)	69
New Zealand Albums (RMNZ)	28
Polish Albums (ZPAV)	13
Portuguese Albums (AFP)	14
Scottish Albums (Official Charts)	4
Spanish Albums (PROMUSICAE)	5
Swedish Physical Albums (Sverigetopplistan)	17
Swiss Albums (Schweizer Hitparade)	4
UK Albums (Official Charts)	11
UK Jazz & Blues Albums (Official Charts)	1
US Billboard 200	20
US Top Jazz Albums (Billboard)	1

=== Year-end charts ===
Chart (2025)	Position
US Traditional Jazz Albums (Billboard)	22

== Release history ==
Release dates and formats
Region	Date	Format(s)	Label	Ref.
Various	September 27, 2024	Digital download; streaming	Interscope	
United States	September 27, 2024	CD; vinyl	Interscope	
Various	October 11, 2024	CD; vinyl	Interscope	
Japan	October 30, 2024	CD	Interscope	
Australia	November 1, 2024	CD; vinyl	Universal Australia	

== See also ==
- Joker: Folie à Deux (soundtrack)
- Joker: Folie à Deux (score)
