= Joker: Folie à Deux (score) =

Joker: Folie à Deux (Score from the Original Motion Picture Soundtrack)

Film score by Hildur Guðnadóttir
- Released: September 27, 2024
- Recorded: 2023–2024
- Genre: Film score
- Length: 33:35
- Label: WaterTower

Hildur Guðnadóttir chronology
A Haunting in Venice (2023)	Joker: Folie à Deux (2024)	Hedda (2025)

Singles from Joker: Folie à Deux (Score from the Original Motion Picture Soundtrack)
- 1. "There Is No Joker" Released: September 9, 2024

Joker: Folie à Deux (Score from the Original Motion Picture Soundtrack) is the film score soundtrack to the 2024 film Joker: Folie à Deux, composed by Hildur Guðnadóttir. The album featured 19 tracks which was released under the WaterTower Music label on September 27, 2024. It was preceded by the lead single "There Is No Joker" released on September 9.

== Development ==
In January 2023, the producers announced that Hildur Guðnadóttir who composed the musical score for Joker (2019) would return for Folie à Deux. Joaquin Phoenix and Todd Phillips attributed that Hildur's music played a huge role in the first film. Phoenix stated that the character and the music has been closely tied together, and a lot of moments where the character express himself in this film were through Hildur's score, while Philips attributed her music being the second biggest character. Like the predecessor, Hildur was provided the script so that she could write the score much earlier, but at the same time she would also give her some of their arrangements of the songs to make it her own version and put her sound into those standards, which "she obviously took to that and, I think, enjoyed it. And it really makes those standards feel like they are part of our film".

Due to the importance of the first film's music and the strong sense of musical identity embedded into the character, she found it quite interesting to work in Folie à Deux in that way. However, she was undeterred about audience expectations of how the music would build and by that it would not affect the creative process. Much of the themes and music had been developed for the first film, that incredibly connected with the character. The major change being the first film's themes being transitioned into the sequel with newer themes. Being a musical film, the soundtrack featured musical numbers where elements of it would be incorporated into Hildur's score.

== Release ==
On September 9, 2024, Hildur released the one-minute and fifty-second composition "There Is No Joker" as the lead single from the album. The 19-track album is scheduled to be released on September 27, 2024, a week ahead of the film's release, by Warner Bros.' in-house label WaterTower Music.

== Critical reception ==
David Rooney of The Hollywood Reporter described it as a "haunting score". Pete Hammond of Deadline Hollywood stated: "[Guðnadóttir] hits just the right notes again". Martin Tsai of Collider wrote "lush extradiegetic orchestral score" to be "occasionally stirring". Bill Bria of /Film wrote "Also special: the way composer Hildur Guðnadóttir weaves her original score in between and in conjunction with the handful of songbook standards performed in the film." Siddhant Adlakha of IGN called it an "eerie, booming score". The Film Stage wrote "Hildur Guðnadóttir's grave-deep, cello-sawing score is heavy enough to throw your back out, lurking in the shadows of every romantic tune or nice moment."

== Track listing ==
All tracks are written by Hildur Guðnadóttir.

Joker: Folie à Deux (Score from the Original Motion Picture Soundtrack) track listing
No.	Title	Length
1.	"It's Showtime"	2:50
2.	"That Dumb Laugh"	1:59
3.	"Same Ol' Joker"	1:40
4.	"The Real You"	2:32
5.	"Back on TV"	1:24
6.	"Buy Me a Drink First?"	1:13
7.	"Trial of the Century"	1:42
8.	"My Mother Had Me Committed"	1:32
9.	"The Saints"	1:17
10.	"The Other Half"	1:43
11.	"Social Services"	1:41
12.	"Knock Knock"	1:39
13.	"Doppelgänger"	2:23
14.	"That's All, Folks"	0:54
15.	"Old Neighborhood"	1:14
16.	"Uh Oh, I'm in Trouble"	1:34
17.	"Voices"	2:25
18.	"There Is No Joker"	1:50
19.	"It's All Theater"	2:03
Total length:		33:35

== Personnel ==
- Hildur Guðnadóttir – cellos, percussion, piano
- Jeff Atmajian – orchestral conductor, orchestration
- Rudy Brynac – editing
- Francesco Donadello – mastering, mixing, engineering
- George Drakoulias – music supervision
- Lena Glikson – editing
- Úlfur Hansson – sound design
- Tom Hardisty – engineering
- Noah Hubbell – engineering, additional mixing
- Hans Jóhannsson – sound design
- Alyssa Park – concertmaster
- Victoria Ruggiero Perez – editing
- Todd Phillips – executive production
- Randall Poster – music supervision
- Jason Ruder – editing
- Sam Schwenk – engineering assistance
- Sandeep Sriram – art direction
- Gunnar Tynes – engineering assistance
- Christian Wenger – editing

Credits adapted from liner notes.

== Accolades ==
Accolades for Joker: Folie à Deux (Score from the Original Motion Picture Soundtrack)
Award	Date of ceremony	Category	Recipient(s)	Result	Ref.
Venice Film Festival	September 7, 2024	Soundtrack Stars Award	Hildur Guðnadóttir	Won	

== See also ==
- Joker: Folie à Deux (soundtrack)
- Harlequin (Lady Gaga album)
