= Good Morning (1939 song) =

Song by Judy Garland and Mickey Rooney
- Released: 1939
- Composer: Nacio Herb Brown
- Lyricist: Arthur Freed

"Good Morning" is a song with music by Nacio Herb Brown and lyrics by Arthur Freed, originally written for the film Babes in Arms (1939) and performed by Judy Garland and Mickey Rooney.

== Covers ==
- The song is best known for being performed in the musical film Singin' in the Rain (1952) by Gene Kelly, Donald O'Connor and Debbie Reynolds. Some erroneously believe that Reynolds' vocal for this song was dubbed by Betty Noyes. However, Noyes was only brought in to dub Reynolds' voice on the songs "Would You" and "You Are My Lucky Star." In 2004, the version in Singin' in the Rain was listed at #72 on AFI's 100 Years...100 Songs survey of the top tunes in American cinema.
- The song was covered and re-written by Lady Gaga for Harlequin (2024), her companion album to the American musical thriller film Joker: Folie à Deux (2024).
