= Johns (film) =

- DVD cover
- Directed by: Scott Silver
- Written by: Scott Silver
- Produced by: Paul Brown; Beau Flynn; Stefan Simchowitz
- Starring: Lukas Haas; David Arquette; Keith David; Christopher Gartin; Elliott Gould; Terrence Dashon Howard; Nicky Katt; Richard Kind; John C. McGinley; Arliss Howard
- Cinematography: Tom Richmond
- Edited by: Dorian Harris
- Music by: Charles Brown; Danny Caron
- Distributed by: First Look International
- Release date: January 31, 1997
- Running time: 96 minutes
- Country: United States
- Language: English
- Box office: $50,789

Johns (styled as johns) is a 1996 American drama film written and directed by Scott Silver and starring David Arquette and Lukas Haas, who portray hustlers who work Santa Monica Boulevard.

== Plot ==
It is Christmas Eve, and John (David Arquette) is asleep in a Los Angeles park. He awakens as someone is stealing his shoes, in which he keeps his money. He chases the thief but cannot catch him. John is angered not only because those are his lucky sneakers but because he is trying to accumulate enough money for an overnight stay in a fancy hotel to celebrate his birthday, which is also Christmas. Each time John puts any money together, via prostitution or stealing from clients, it is taken from him either by robbery or in payback for a drug deal where he burned the dealer.

Meanwhile, Donner (Lukas Haas), a fellow hustler who is new to the streets and has fallen for John, tries to convince John to go with him to Branson, Missouri. Donner has a relative who runs a theme park there who can get them jobs. John is initially resistant to the idea but, after some particularly bad experiences, agrees to go.

John and Donner have enough money for two bus tickets to Branson but John takes one last date to earn money for expenses. After their sexual encounter at a motel, however, John's date is remorseful for having gone through with the act. He insists to John that he is not gay. John smiles and says that he is not either. But his date believes that John is making a mockery of him and turns violent, beating John to death mercilessly.

Donner goes in search of John and finds him at the motel. Donner drags John's lifeless body from the bathroom to the bed and tearfully confesses that he is the one who stole the sneakers and money in a desperate attempt to persuade John to leave town with him.

== Cast ==
- David Arquette as John
- Lukas Haas as Donner
- Wilson Cruz as Mikey
- Keith David as Homeless John
- Christopher Gartin as Eli
- Elliott Gould as Manny Gold
- Terrence Dashon Howard as Jimmy, The Warlock
- Nicky Katt as "Mix"
- Richard Kind as Paul Truman
- John C. McGinley as Danny Cohen
- Richard Timothy Jones as Mr. Popper
- Alanna Ubach as Nikki
- Arliss Howard as John Cardoza
- Nina Siemaszko as Tiffany, The Prostitute
- Craig Bierko as Christmas Radio Preacher

== Reception ==
On the review aggregator website Rotten Tomatoes, the film has a score of 57% based on 14 critics' reviews.

Film critic Stephen Holden says the film is a "fine, tough-minded study of Los Angeles street hustlers". He compliments actor David Arquette's performance as "a taut, understated ferocity that is absolutely on target", and goes on to state that Lukas Haas brings to his role "an appropriately coarsened variation on the moist, doe-eyed boy-ingenue." He notes that "one major mistake is embellishing the story with a pretentious overlay of Christmas symbolism; the movie doesn't need Jesus; it doesn't even need Christmas to makes its grim, tawdry little tale hit home." Mike Davies of The Birmingham Post wrote that the film "suffers from overworked, leaden symbolism and inconsistent script but the twin performances are excellent; there's some snappy dialogue and it's shot through with a poignancy and humanity that'll linger in your heart."

In her review for The Austin Chronicle, Alison Macor praises Haas for "giving another standout performance", and likewise, says Arquette "makes even the smallest performance noticeable." Overall she concludes that the movie is "short on general story development but long on characterization; it offers viewers a glimpse into the seedier side of life as portrayed by two rising talents." American film critic James Berardinelli states "the most compelling performance is turned in by Lukas Haas, whose sincerity and optimism as Donner is heartbreaking." However, Berardinelli is disappointed that "the film gets caught up in trying to tell a grandly melodramatic tale, when a simple, down-to-earth story of broken dreams and lonely characters would have been more engrossing."

Roger Ebert is on board with the two actors performances as well, opining that "David Arquette and Lukas Haas find the right note for their characters". And like Holden, he also highlights the "Christ symbolism" in the movie, but Ebert contends that the movie "overcomes the undergraduate symbol-mongering of its screenplay with a story that comes to life in spite of itself." Almar Haflidason of the BBC wrote "as a directorial and screenwriting debut by Scott Silver, it has some strong moments." Haflidason also observed that "the film has a bleached look to it that helps add bleakness to the street settings."

Cuban-American writer Achy Obejas wrote "the tawdry, violent conclusion of Johns is hardly a surprise — Silver telegraphs it practically from the first frame." However, she is surprised that the film's ending clings to the bury your gays trope, where LGBTQ characters must die to achieve nobility, and she is even more surprised that "Silver lays the blame for its tragic ending at the feet of the film's one potentially decent gay figure."

== Awards and nominations ==
- San Sebastián International Film Festival Best New Director - Scott Silver (1996)

== DVD release ==
Johns was released on Region 1 DVD on February 29, 2000.
