= The Joker (Anthony Newley song) =

1964 song written by Leslie Bricusse and Anthony Newley

"The Joker" is a song by Leslie Bricusse and Anthony Newley, from the 1964 musical The Roar of the Greasepaint – The Smell of the Crowd.

== Plot ==
The song is a lament of a person, seen by the outside world as a jester and a comedian especially when they fail, who inwardly feels tremendous pain. The person ultimately accepts their fate, noting that someone is in the same position in every society. In the musical, the song—sung by the lead, Cocky (played by Newley in the original American production)—leads into the Act One closer, "Who Can I Turn To?"

== Other notable recordings ==
- Sammy Davis Jr., on the album Sammy's Back on Broadway (1965)
- Sérgio Mendes, on the album Herb Alpert Presents Sergio Mendes & Brasil '66 (1966)
- Wes Montgomery, on the album A Day In The Life (1967)
- Gina Riley, for the opening theme to the Australian sitcom Kath & Kim, the full recording of which appeared on the soundtrack album Kath & Kim's Party Tape (2004)
- Joaquin Phoenix, in the jukebox musical film Joker: Folie à Deux (2024)

=== Shirley Bassey version ===
External audio
- Audio of Shirley Bassey performing "The Joker" for This Is My Life (1968) on YouTube

Welsh singer Shirley Bassey covered "The Joker" for her album This Is My Life (1968), which became the most well-known version of the song. AllMusic compared her rendition's end melody to the "he loves gold" ending of "Goldfinger" (1964), Bassey's theme song for the James Bond movie of the same name. In an article by The Observer in 1970, Tony Palmer noted the song for presenting Bassey's unique singing style, and wrote: "Her manner of singing has a deliberate and self-conscious hysteria. Words become symbols of agony. So the simple and innocent word 'Joker' becomes 'Jok…aarh,' concluded with a raspy punch."

=== Lady Gaga version ===
External audio
- Audio of Lady Gaga's cover from the album Harlequin (2024) on YouTube

American singer Lady Gaga covered "The Joker" for Harlequin (2024), her companion album to the film Joker: Folie à Deux from the same year, in which she starred as Harley Quinn. She first teased the song in a video shot inside the Louvre, in which she gives the Mona Lisa a red grin with her lipstick. While discussing Harlequin, Gaga shared how she and her co-producer (fiancé Michael Polansky) subtly infused the Joker's influence into the music. She pointed to their cover of "The Joker" as the boldest example, calling it a declaration of power by her character Lee—seen as the true mastermind and embodiment of the Joker in the relationship.

Her cover is a rock-infused reinterpretation of the song, featuring raw electric guitars and forceful percussion reminiscent of Gaga's Joanne era (2016). The track builds gradually, reaching its peak with a powerful delivery from Gaga, who growls "The Joker is me" over a distorted guitar riff and pounding drums. Critics praised the cover for Gaga's strong vocals, and noted how she brought her own distinct style and presence to the track. In the United Kingdom, it debuted at number 91 on both the Official Singles Sales and Official Singles Downloads charts. A live rendition of the song was part of the concert special, Lady Gaga in Harlequin Live: One Night Only (2025).
