= The Mod Squad (film) =

1999 film by Scott Silver

- Theatrical release poster
- Directed by: Scott Silver
- Written by: Stephen Kay; Scott Silver; Kate Lanier
- Based on: The Mod Squad by Bud "Buddy" Ruskin
- Produced by: Alan Riche; Ben Myron; Tony Ludwing
- Starring: Claire Danes; Omar Epps; Giovanni Ribisi; Dennis Farina; Josh Brolin; Steve Harris; Michael Lerner
- Cinematography: Ellen Kuras
- Edited by: Dorian Harris
- Music by: BC Smith
- Production company: Metro-Goldwyn-Mayer Pictures
- Distributed by: MGM Distribution Co.
- Release date: March 26, 1999
- Running time: 92 minutes
- Country: United States
- Language: English
- Budget: $21 million
- Box office: $15.4 million

The Mod Squad is a 1999 American action thriller film directed by Scott Silver, based on the television show of the same name. Starring Claire Danes, Omar Epps, and Giovanni Ribisi, the film follows a trio of young criminals who work for the police to avoid jail time.

Released by Metro Goldwyn Mayer on March 26, 1999, it was panned by critics and was a box office bomb, grossing only $15.4 million out of its $21 million budget.

== Plot ==
Julie Barnes, Pete Cochran, and Linc Hayes are three young delinquents who choose to work undercover for the police in place of serving their jail terms.

While investigating a club suspected of running prostitutes, Linc notices their superior, Captain Adam Greer, meeting with Gilbert, a criminal he had encountered at a previous bust. While working as a waitress at the club, Julie runs into an old boyfriend, Billy, who she had dated while both were addicted to drugs, and rekindles their relationship. Linc tracks Gilbert to a meeting with Greer, and the trio arrive just as Greer is murdered by an unseen assailant.

While being questioned by Internal Affairs, they find out that cocaine was found at the scene of Greer's murder, suspected to be stolen from a police evidence locker, and decide to investigate the killing. Linc and Pete stakeout Gilbert's beachside trailer and witness him being killed, but miss that Tricky and Greene, cops from another department, were the killers. While talking to Mothershed, Tricky and Greene's superior, Pete deduces that he is involved and quickly leaves, while Linc is attacked at his apartment by masked gunmen and narrowly escapes.

Julie, suspicious of Billy's behavior after having had sex with him, follows him to a mansion in the Hills where she realizes that he is a pimp, overhears a phone call where Billy references Tricky, and sees him sleep with another woman, understanding that he was lying to her since their meeting at the club.

The trio learn that Gilbert was Tricky's snitch, and deduce that the dirty cops under Mothershed's command stole the drugs from the evidence locker and tried to frame Greer, who was murdered when he got too close in his investigation of the missing drugs. They stakeout a meeting at Mothershed's house, and overhear them admit to the scheme and detail Billy's deal.

While Julie keeps Billy busy, Linc goes undercover at the mansion, where Howard, a music promoter, is moving a large amount of cocaine. Linc goes with Howard to a desert airstrip, where his Hanson-like boy band is landing in a plane with his money. Pete and Julie also arrive at the airstrip, having overheard Billy talking about the location on the phone. The dirty cops arrive at the airstrip, and a gunfight ensues. After driving Linc's car into the airstrip's warehouse, Pete and Linc subdue Tricky while Julie stops Billy from escaping, beating him with the suitcase of money. When IA Detective Briggs arrives with other police, Mothershed and his men are arrested, while the "Mod Squad" are asked to continue their positions in the force.

== Cast ==
- Claire Danes as Julie Barnes
- Giovanni Ribisi as Pete Cochran
- Omar Epps as Linc Hayes
- Dennis Farina as Greer
- Josh Brolin as Billy
- Steve Harris as Briggs
- Richard Jenkins as Mothershed
- Larry Brandenburg as Eckford
- Lionel Mark Smith as Lanier
- Sam McMurray as Tricky
- Michael O'Neill as Greene
- Stephen T. Kay as Bald Dude
- Bodhi Pine Elfman as Gilbert - Skinny Freak
- Holmes Osborne as Mr. Cochrane
- Dey Young as Mrs. Cochrane
- Toby Huss as Red
- Michael Lerner as Howard
- Eddie Griffin as Sonny

== Production ==
In April 1997, it was announced that MGM was moving forward on a film adaptation of The Mod Squad, with Stacy Title initially set to direct. In July of that year, it was reported Tobey Maguire was in negotiations to star in the film. By August, Title had left the project due to creative differences with producers and Scott Silver took over the position of director and would also rewrite the script. Jonathan Dayton and Valerie Faris turned down the opportunity to direct the film. In March 1998, Claire Danes had signed on as one of the three leads with Giovanni Ribisi and Omar Epps filling out the leads later that same month.

== Reception ==
On the review aggregator website Rotten Tomatoes, 3% of 63 critics' reviews are positive, with an average rating of 3.1/10. The website's consensus reads: "The Mod Squad aims for stylish cool and thrilling adventure, but collapses in an incoherent jumble of dated source material and unintentional hilarity." Metacritic, which uses a weighted average, assigned the film a score of 16 out of 100, based on 21 critics, indicating "overwhelming dislike". Audiences polled by CinemaScore gave the film an average grade of "C−" on an A+ to F scale.

=== Awards ===
The film was nominated for a Razzie Award for Worst Screenplay, but lost out to another television show turned movie: Wild Wild West. At the 1999 Stinkers Bad Movie Awards, the film was nominated for four awards: Worst Picture, Worst Actress (Danes), Worst Supporting Actor (Ribisi), and Worst Resurrection of a TV Show.

== Lawsuit ==
In April 1998, it was reported Richard Ruskin, son of credited The Mod Squad creator Bud "Buddy" Ruskin, had filed suit against Spelling Television and MGM alleging that executive producer Aaron Spelling never legally purchased the film rights to the series which Ruskin claimed were "separated rights" owned by his late father. Ruskin further claimed Spelling, via the William Morris Agency, told Ruskin he was not entitled to monetary compensation and alleged he was forced into quitclaim of $7,500 when The Mod Squad should be worth millions.
