= Scott Silver =

American film director, screenwriter

- Born: November 30, 1964 (age 61); Worcester, Massachusetts, U.S.
- Education: Boston University (BA)
- Occupations: Screenwriter, film director
- Notable work: Johns; The Mod Squad; 8 Mile; The Fighter; Joker

Scott Silver (born November 30, 1964) is an American screenwriter and film director.

== Career ==
Silver is best known for such films as Johns, The Mod Squad, 8 Mile, The Fighter, for which he was nominated for an Academy Award for Best Original Screenplay, and Joker, for which he was nominated for an Academy Award for Best Adapted Screenplay, alongside Todd Phillips. He is also set to co-write the script to the upcoming Spawn reboot, entitled King Spawn.

Silver is Jewish. He graduated from Boston University's College of Communication in 1986. Silver graduated from The American Film Institute in 1992, the same graduating class as Darren Aronofsky, Todd Field, Mark Waters, Doug Ellin, Matthew Libatique, and Michael Bauman.

== Filmography ==
| Year | Title | Director | Writer | Producer |
|---|---|---|---|---|
| 1996 | Johns | Yes | Yes | No |
| 1997 | The House of Yes | No | No | Co-executive |
| 1999 | The Mod Squad | Yes | Yes | No |
| 2002 | 8 Mile | No | Yes | No |
| 2010 | The Fighter | No | Yes | No |
| 2016 | The Finest Hours | No | Yes | No |
| 2017 | Stronger | No | No | Yes |
| 2019 | Joker | No | Yes | No |
| 2024 | Joker: Folie à Deux | No | Yes | Executive |

Uncredited rewrites

- X-Men Origins: Wolverine (2009)

Special thanks

- Requiem for a Dream (2000)
- Then She Found Me (2007)
- Bleed for This (2016)
- Siberia (2018)

== Awards and nominations ==
| Year | Association | Category | Work | Result |
|---|---|---|---|---|
| 1996 | San Sebastián International Film Festival | Best New Director | Johns | Won |
| 2000 | Golden Raspberry Awards | Worst Screenplay | The Mod Squad | Nominated |
| 2011 | Academy Award | Best Original Screenplay | The Fighter | Nominated |
| 2020 | Critics' Choice Movie Award | Best Adapted Screenplay | Joker | Nominated |
| 2020 | British Academy Film Award | Best Adapted Screenplay | Joker | Nominated |
| 2020 | Writers Guild of America Award | Best Adapted Screenplay | Joker | Nominated |
| 2020 | Academy Award | Best Adapted Screenplay | Joker | Nominated |
| 2025 | Golden Raspberry Awards | Worst Screenplay | Joker: Folie à Deux | Nominated |
