= The Roar of the Greasepaint – The Smell of the Crowd =

1964 musical

- Original Recording
- Music: Leslie Bricusse; Anthony Newley
- Lyrics: Leslie Bricusse; Anthony Newley
- Book: Leslie Bricusse; Anthony Newley
- Productions: 1964 UK tour 1965 Broadway

The Roar of the Greasepaint – The Smell of the Crowd is a musical with a book, music, and lyrics by Leslie Bricusse and Anthony Newley. The musical is best known for introducing the standards "Look at That Face", "A Wonderful Day Like Today", "Who Can I Turn To?", "Feeling Good", and "The Joker". The show title is a transposition of the phrase "the smell of the greasepaint, the roar of the crowd," referring to the experience of theatre performers.

== Synopsis ==
Resembling a music hall production more than a book musical, the allegorical plot examines the maintenance of the status quo between the upper and lower classes of British society in the 1960s. The two main characters are Sir and Cocky. Since Sir is forever changing the rules of the game of life, downtrodden young Cocky always gets the short end of the stick. Assisting Sir is his eager disciple Kid, anxious to pick up bits of wisdom while helping keep Cocky in his place. Cocky tries to beat Sir at the game, first by getting a job, and then with love, but Sir bests him both times. Cocky is re-inspired when he sees a new character, the Negro, win the game behind his and Sir's backs. By ignoring the rules, Cocky manages to win, but neither he nor Sir can function without the other. The show ends with both of them frozen in a pose arguing which way to go next.

== History ==
With this project, Bricusse and Newley had hoped to match the success of their 1962 hit Stop the World – I Want to Get Off. The show opened at Theatre Royal in Nottingham on 3 August 1964, and then toured the UK in anticipation of a London opening. Cocky was played by Norman Wisdom; Sir by Willoughby Goddard; The Kid by Sally Smith; The Girl by Dilys Watling; The Negro by Cy Grant; and Elaine Paige made her first professional appearance on stage in the chorus.

However, audience interest was minimal, and it never reached the West End. American theatre producer David Merrick saw the show in Liverpool and, aware production costs could be kept low, decided to bring it to the United States, beginning with a lengthy national tour, under the condition that Anthony Newley step into the starring role of Cocky. Tony Bennett's hit version of "Who Can I Turn To?" and an original cast recording released by RCA Victor several weeks before the show reached New York City – the opposite of normal practice – brought the musical to the public's awareness and boosted sales. The tour was so successful that most of Merrick's investment was paid back while the show was still on the road.

After seven previews, the Broadway production, directed by Newley and choreographed by Gillian Lynne, opened on 16 May 1965 at the Shubert Theatre, where it ran for 231 performances. The cast included Newley as Cocky; Cyril Ritchard as Sir; Sally Smith from the UK production repeating her role as The Kid; Joyce Jillson as The Girl; and Gilbert Price as The Negro. Conductor Herbert Grossman served as music director.

== Song list ==
Act I

- "The Beautiful Land" – The Urchins
- "A Wonderful Day Like Today" – Sir, Cocky, The Urchins
- "It Isn't Enough" – Cocky, The Urchins
- "Things to Remember"
- "Put It in the Book"
- "With All Due Respect" (Cut during previews)
- "This Dream"
- "Where Would You Be Without Me?"
- "Look at That Face"
- "My First Love Song"
- "The Joker"
- "Who Can I Turn To?"

Act II

- "A Funny Funeral"
- "That's What It Is to Be Young"
- "What a Man!"
- "Feeling Good"
- "Nothing Can Stop Me Now!"
- "Things to Remember (Reprise)"
- "My Way"
- "Who Can I Turn To? (Reprise)"
- "The Beautiful Land (Reprise)"
- "Sweet Beginning"

== Song recordings ==
In addition to Bennett, Newley and Dusty Springfield had hit recordings of "Who Can I Turn To?" The same song was recorded by The Main Ingredient as the B-side of their 1972 hit "Everybody Plays the Fool".

Many artists have covered "Feelin' Good," including Nina Simone, Michael Bublé, Muse, Traffic, and Freda Payne, among others.

"The Joker" was recorded by Gina Riley for use as the opening theme song for the Australian sitcom Kath & Kim and was covered originally by Shirley Bassey. However, the most well-known recordings were by Bobby Rydell and Sérgio Mendes & Brasil '66.

The main theme song for the Miss Venezuela beauty pageant from the early 1970s until 2008 used the tune from "A Wonderful Day Like Today".

In 2017, Ritchard's recording of "Wonderful Day" was prominently featured in the first episode of The Marvelous Mrs. Maisel.

"Look at that Face" was recorded by Barbra Streisand for her album, "Color Me Barbra". It has also been recorded by Anthony Newley, Sammy Davis Jr, and Carmen McRae.

== Awards and honours ==
=== Original Broadway production ===
Year	Award	Category	Nominee	Result
1965	Tony Award	Best Producer	David Merrick	Nominated
1965	Tony Award	Best Original Score	Anthony Newley and Leslie Bricusse	Nominated
1965	Tony Award	Best Performance by a Leading Actor in a Musical	Cyril Ritchard	Nominated
1965	Tony Award	Best Direction of a Musical	Anthony Newley	Nominated
1965	Tony Award	Best Scenic Design	Sean Kenny	Nominated
1965	Tony Award	Best Costume Design	Freddy Wittop	Nominated
1965	Theatre World Award		Joyce Jillson	Won
