= Donald Barrett (musician) =

American drummer (born 1978)

- Born: January 30, 1978 (age 48); Waukegan, Illinois, United States
- Genres: Pop, R&B, funk, rock
- Occupations: Musician, songwriter, record producer
- Instrument: Drums
- Website: www.donaldmusic.com

Donald Barrett (born January 30, 1978) is an American drummer who has toured with Grammy Award-winners Toni Braxton, George Benson as well as ZZ Ward; he was also Colbie Caillat’s music director. He has performed with Sade, Seal, Pink, New Kids On The Block, Jesse McCartney and The Pussycat Dolls among others. He has also played on Josh Kelley’s Get With It, Just Say the Word, Almost Honest, To Remember, and Macy Gray’s The Way. He was also the drummer for Last Call With Carson Daly's house band from 2006 to 2009 and contributed to the Twilight: Breaking Dawn soundtrack as well as the soundtrack for the Kikaider Reboot.

== Early life and career ==
Barrett was born in Waukegan, Illinois, a suburb of Chicago. He learned to play the drums at the age of three years, and while on a scholarship to Northern Illinois University, he immersed himself in trios to big band, while studying with jazz greats Ed Thigpen and Wynton Marsalis. He moved to Los Angeles and found work as a session musician, and has worked with Colbie Caillat (and worked as her music director), Macy Gray, Josh Kelly as well as numerous soundtrack albums, including Twilight: Breaking Dawn and the Kikaider Reboot.

He also backed up artists, including Sade, George Benson, Pink, and others on televised performances on the Tonight Show with Jay Leno, The Oprah Winfrey Show, Late Show with David Letterman, The Late Late Show with Craig Ferguson and others. His debut single as a solo performer, Futurama, was released in September 2014.
