= Sammy Davis Jr. discography =

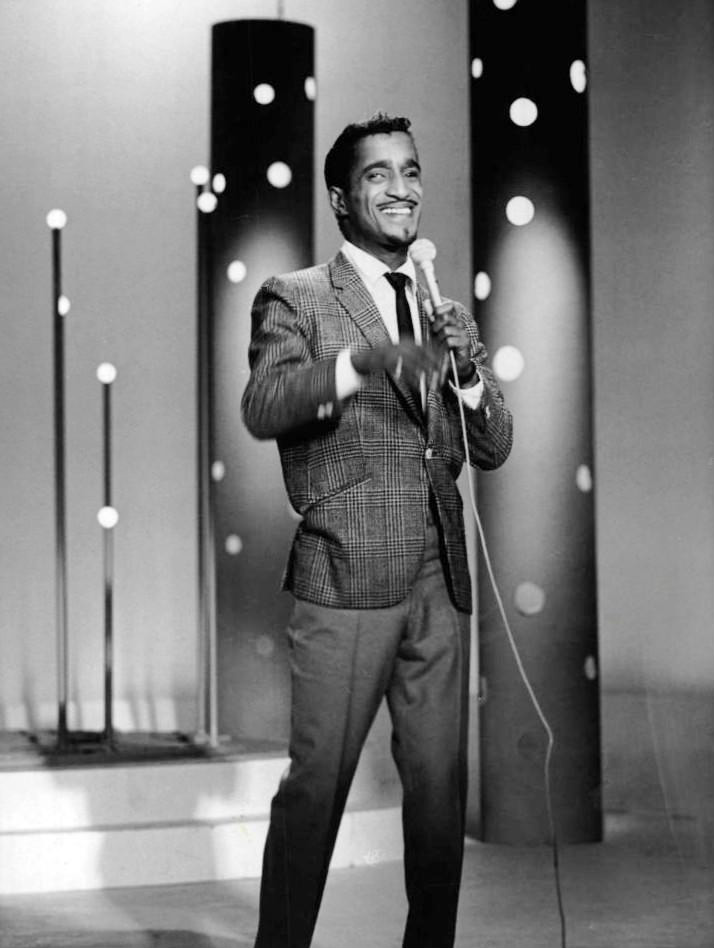
Sammy Davis Jr. performing in 1966

The American jazz singer Sammy Davis Jr. recorded extensively throughout his career and most recordings remain in the catalogs as various reissues. The following is a selected list of albums in chronological order by date of release.

== Albums ==
=== Decca Records ===
- 1955 Starring Sammy Davis Jr.
- 1955 Just for Lovers
- 1956 Mr. Wonderful
- 1956 Here's Lookin' at You
- 1957 Sammy Swings
- 1957 It's All Over but the Swingin'
- 1957 Boy Meets Girl (with Carmen McRae)
- 1958 Mood to Be Wooed
- 1958 All The Way... and Then Some!
- 1959 Sammy Davis, Jr. at Town Hall
- 1959 Porgy and Bess (with Carmen McRae)
- 1960 Sammy Awards
- 1960 I Gotta Right to Swing
- 1961 Mr. Entertainment
- 1963 Forget-Me-Nots for First Nighters

=== Reprise Records ===
- 1961 The Wham of Sam
- 1961 As Long as She Needs Me
- 1962 Sammy Davis Jr. Belts the Best of Broadway
- 1962 The Sammy Davis Jr. All-Star Spectacular
- 1962 What Kind of Fool Am I and Other Show-Stoppers
- 1963 Sammy Davis Jr. at the Cocoanut Grove (live)
- 1964 Sammy Davis Jr. Salutes the Stars of the London Palladium
- 1964 The Shelter of Your Arms
- 1964 Sammy Davis Jr. Sings Mel Tormé's "California Suite"
- 1964 Sammy Davis Jr. Sings the Big Ones for Young Lovers
- 1965 When the Feeling Hits You! (with Sam Butera and the Witnesses)
- 1965 If I Ruled the World
- 1965 The Nat King Cole Songbook
- 1965 Sammy's Back on Broadway
- 1966 The Sammy Davis Jr. Show
- 1966 The Sounds of '66 (live, with Buddy Rich)
- 1966 Sammy Davis, Jr. Sings and Laurindo Almeida Plays (with Laurindo Almeida)
- 1967 That's All! (live)
- 1967 Sammy Davis Jr. Sings the Complete "Dr. Dolittle"
- 1968 Sammy Davis Jr.
- 1968 Lonely Is the Name
- 1968 I've Gotta Be Me
- 1969 The Goin's Great
- 1970 Sammy Steps Out

=== Verve Records ===
- 1965 Our Shining Hour (with The Count Basie Orchestra)

=== Motown Records ===
- 1970 Something for Everyone
- 1984 Hello Detroit (Single)

=== MGM Records ===
- 1972 Sammy Davis Jr. Now
- 1972 Portrait of Sammy Davis Jr.
- 1974 That's Entertainment!

=== 20th Century Records ===
- 1976 The Song and Dance Man
- 1977 Sings the Great TV-Tunes

=== RCA Victor ===
- 1977 In Person: Australia '77
- 1979 Hearin' is Believin'

=== Applause Records ===
- 1982 Closest of Friends

== Guest appearances ==
With Lena Horne

- "I Wish I'd Met You" on The Men in My Life (1988, Three Cherries Records)

With various artists

- Reprise Musical Repertory Theatre (1963, Reprise)
  - "The Great Come-and-Get It Day" - Finian's Rainbow
  - "We Open in Venice", "Too Darn Hot" - Kiss Me Kate
  - "There Is Nothing Like a Dame", "You've Got to Be Carefully Taught" - South Pacific
  - "Sit Down, You're Rockin' the Boat" - Guys and Dolls

== Singles ==
Year	Single	Peak chart positions				Album
Year	Single	US Pop	US AC	US Country	UK	Album
1950	"Inka Dinka Doo" b/w "Laura"	—	—	—	—	Non-album tracks
1950	"Dedicated to You" b/w "I'm Sorry Dear"	—	—	—	—	Non-album tracks
1954	"Hey There" /	16	—	—	19	Starring Sammy Davis Jr.
1954	"And This Is My Beloved"	—	—	—	—	Starring Sammy Davis Jr.
1954	"Because of You - Part 1" b/w "Because of You - Part 2"	—	—	—	—	Starring Sammy Davis Jr.
1954	"The Red Grapes" b/w "Glad to Be Unhappy" (from Starring Sammy Davis Jr.)	—	—	—	—	Non-album track
1954	"Love (Your Magic Spell Is Everywhere)" /	—	—	—	—	Here's Lookin' at You
1954	"The Birth of the Blues"	—	—	—	—	Starring Sammy Davis Jr.
1955	"Something's Gotta Give" /	9	—	—	11	Forget-Me-Nots for First Nighters
1955	"Love Me or Leave Me"	12	—	—	8	Sammy Davis Jr.
1955	"That Old Black Magic" b/w "A Man with a Dream" (Non-album track)	13	—	—	16	Sammy Swings
1955	"A Fine Romance" b/w "I Go for You" (Non-album track) (Both sides with Carmen McRae)	—	—	—	—	Boy Meets Girl
1955	"It's Bigger Than You or Me" b/w "Back Track!" (from Sammy Davis Jr.)	—	—	—	—	Non-album tracks
1955	"Ac-Cent-Tchu-Ate the Positive" b/w "Beat Me Daddy, Eight to the Bar" (Both sides with Gary Crosby)	—	—	—	—	Non-album tracks
1955	"I'll Know"	87	—	—	—	Forget-Me-Nots for First Nighters
1955	"Adelaide"	—	—	—	—	Sammy Davis Jr.
1956	"Five" b/w "You're Sensational"	71	—	—	—	Non-album tracks
1956	"Earthbound" b/w "Just One of Those Things" (from Here's Lookin' at You)	46	—	—	—	Non-album tracks
1956	"New York's My Home" b/w "Never Like This" (Non-album track)	59	—	—	—	Forget-Me-Nots for First Nighters
1956	"In a Persian Market" b/w "The Man with the Golden Arm" (Non-album track)	—	—	—	28	Here's Lookin' at You
1956	"Frankie and Johnny" b/w "Circus"	—	—	—	—	Sammy Davis Jr.
1956	"Jacques D'Iraque" /	—	—	—	—	Mr. Wonderful -- Original Cast recording
1956	"Too Close for Comfort"	—	—	—	—	Mr. Wonderful -- Original Cast recording
1956	"Without You I'm Nothing" b/w "Get Out of the Car" (Non-album track)	—	—	—	—	Mr. Wonderful -- Original Cast recording
1956	"Dangerous" b/w "All About Love" (Non-album track)	—	—	—	—	Sammy Davis Jr.
1956	"All of You" b/w "Six Bridges to Cross" (Non-album track)	—	—	—	28	Forget-Me-Nots for First Nighters
1957	"Long Before I Knew You" b/w "The Golden Key" (Non-album track)	—	—	—	—	Forget-Me-Nots for First Nighters
1957	"French Fried Potatoes and Ketchup" b/w "Goodbye, So Long, I'm Gone"	—	—	—	—	Non-album tracks
1957	"Don'cha Go 'Way Mad" b/w "Specially for Little Girls" (Non-album track)	—	—	—	—	Sammy Swings
1957	"Mad Ball" b/w "Cool Credo"	—	—	—	—	Non-album tracks
1957	"All Dressed Up and No Place to Go" b/w "Moment of Madness" (Non-album track)	—	—	—	—	Forget-Me-Nots for First Nighters
1958	"I'm Comin' Home" b/w "Hallelujah I Love Her So"	—	—	—	—	Non-album tracks
1958	"No Fool Like an Old Fool" b/w "Unspoken"	—	—	—	—	Non-album tracks
1958	"I Ain't Gonna Change (The Way I Feel About You)" b/w "Song and Dance Man" (from Mr. Entertainment)	—	—	—	—	Non-album tracks
1958	"I Never Got Out of Paris" b/w "That's Anna"	—	—	—	—	Non-album tracks
1959	"You'll Never Get Away from Me" b/w "Fair Warning"	—	—	—	—	Non-album tracks
1959	"I Got Plenty o' Nuttin''" b/w "There's a Boat Dat's Leavin' Soon for New York"	—	—	—	—	Porgy and Bess -- soundtrack
1960	"Happy to Make Your Acquaintance" b/w "Baby, It's Cold Outside" (Both sides with Carmen McRae)	—	—	—	46	Boy Meets Girl
1960	"I Got a Woman" b/w "Mess Around"	—	—	—	—	I Gotta Right to Swing!
1960	"This Little Girl of Mine" b/w "Face to Face"	—	—	—	—	I Gotta Right to Swing!
1960	"Eee-O-Eleven" b/w "Ain't That a Kick in the Head"	—	—	—	—	Non-album tracks
1961	"Back in Your Own Backyard" b/w "I'm a Fool to Want You" (from The Wham Of Sam)	—	—	—	—	As Long As She Needs Me
1961	"There Was a Tavern in the Town" b/w "One More Time (A Tribute to Ray Charles)" (Non-album track)	—	—	—	—	As Long As She Needs Me
1962	"Bye Bye Blackbird" b/w "We Kiss in a Shadow"	—	—	—	—	As Long As She Needs Me
1962	"What Kind of Fool Am I" /	17	6	—	26	"What Kind of Fool Am I" and Other Show-Stoppers
1962	"Gonna Build a Mountain"	—	—	—	26	"What Kind of Fool Am I" and Other Show-Stoppers
1962	"The Fool I Used to Be" b/w "Everybody Calls Me Joe"	—	—	—	—	Non-album tracks
1962	"Someone Nice Like You" b/w "Once in a Lifetime"	—	—	—	—	"What Kind of Fool Am I" and Other Show-Stoppers
1962	"Me and My Shadow" (with Frank Sinatra) /	64	18	—	20	At the Cocoanut Grove
1962	"Sam's Song" (with Dean Martin)	94	—	—	—	The Sammy Davis Jr. Show
1963	"As Long As She Needs Me" b/w "Song from 'Two for the Seesaw' (A Second Chance)"	59	19	—	—	As Long as She Needs Me
1963	"The Shelter of Your Arms" b/w "This Was My Love" (Non-album track)	17	6	—	—	The Shelter of Your Arms
1964	"Choose" /	112	—	—	—	Sammy Davis Jr. Sings the Big Ones for Young Lovers
1964	"Bee-Bom"	135	—	—	—	The Shelter of Your Arms
1964	"Not for Me" b/w "Night Song" (from If I Ruled the World)	—	—	—	—	Sammy Davis Jr. Sings the Big Ones for Young Lovers
1964	"Don't Shut Me Out" b/w "The Disorderly Orderly" (Non-album track)	106	—	—	—	Sammy Davis Jr. Sings the Big Ones for Young Lovers
1965	"If I Ruled the World" b/w "Flash, Bang, Wallop!"	135	—	—	—	If I Ruled the World
1965	"Hello, Dolly!" b/w "Take the Moment"	—	—	—	—	Sammy's Back on Broadway
1965	"No One Can Live Forever" b/w "Unforgettable" (from The Nat King Cole Song Book by Sammy)	117	33	—	—	The Sammy Davis Jr. Show
1965	"Courage" b/w "Love, At Last You Have Found Me" (from The Sammy Davis Jr. Show)	—	—	—	—	Non-album tracks
1966	"Courage" b/w "Yes I Can" (from If I Ruled the World)	—	—	—	—	Non-album tracks
1966	"The Second Best Secret Agent in the Whole Wide World" b/w "If You Want This Love of Mine" (from The Sammy Davis Jr. Show)	—	—	—	—	Non-album tracks
1966	"Lonely Weekends" b/w "More Than One Way" (from The Sammy Davis Jr. Show)	—	—	—	—	Non-album tracks
1966	"Ev'ry Time We Say Goodbye" b/w "All That Jazz" (from "A Man Called Adam" soundtrack)	—	—	—	—	Lonely Is the Name
1966	"We'll Be Together Again" b/w "The Good Life"	—	—	—	—	Lonely Is the Name
1967	"The Birth of the Blues" b/w "With a Song in My Heart"	—	—	—	—	Non-album tracks
1967	"Don't Blame the Children" b/w "She Believes in Me" (from I've Gotta Be Me)	37	—	—	—	Non-album tracks
1967	"Talk to the Animals" b/w "Something in Your Smile"	—	—	—	—	Sammy Davis Jr. Sings the Complete "Dr. Dolittle"
1968	"Lonely Is the Name" b/w "Flash, Bang, Wallop!"	93	12	—	—	Lonely Is the Name
1968	"Break My Mind" b/w "Children, Children" (from Lonely Is the Name)	106	—	—	—	The Goin's Great
1968	"I've Gotta Be Me" b/w "Natural Bein' Me" (from The Goin's Great)	11	1	—	—	I've Gotta Be Me
1968	"Salt and Pepper" b/w "I Like the Way You Dance"	—	—	—	—	"Salt and Pepper" soundtrack
1969	"Rhythm of Life" b/w "The Pompeii Club" (Orchestra instrumental)	124	—	—	—	"Sweet Charity" soundtrack
1969	"I Have But One Life to Live" b/w "The Goin's Great"	119	—	—	—	The Goin's Great
1970	"Where Do I Go from Here" b/w "One More Time"	—	—	—	—	"One More Time" soundtrack
1971	"Runaround" b/w "She Is Today"	—	—	—	—	Sammy Steps Out
1971	"In My Own Lifetime" b/w "I'll Begin Again"	—	—	—	—	Non-album tracks
1972	"The Candy Man" b/w "I Want to Be Happy"	1	1	—	—	Sammy Davis Jr. Now
1972	"The People Tree" b/w "Mr. Bojangles"	92	16	—	—	Portrait of Sammy Davis Jr.
1973	"(I'd Be) A Legend in My Time" b/w "I'm Not Anyone" (from "Sammy"-The Original Television Soundtrack)	116	29	—	—	Non-album track
1974	"Singin' in the Rain" b/w "Chattanooga Choo Choo" (Non-album track)	—	16	—	—	That's Entertainment
1974	"That's Entertainment!" b/w "Singin' in the Rain"	—	41	—	—	That's Entertainment
1974	"Sing" b/w "This Is the House of the People"	—	—	—	—	Non-album tracks
1975	"Chico and the Man" b/w "(I'd Be) A Legend in My Time"	—	24	—	—	The Song and Dance Man
1975	"Song and Dance Man" b/w "Snap Your Fingers"	—	32	—	—	The Song and Dance Man
1976	"Baretta's Theme" b/w "I Heard a Song"	101	42	—	—	The Song and Dance Man
1982	"Smoke, Smoke, Smoke" b/w "We Could Have Been the Closest of Friends"	—	—	89	—	Closest Of Friends
1984	"Hello, Detroit" b/w "Hello Detroit" (Long version)	—	—	—	—	Non-album tracks
"—" denotes releases that did not chart.
