= Sammy Davis Jr. Salutes the Stars of the London Palladium =

Studio album by Sammy Davis Jr.
- Released: 1964
- Recorded: 1964
- Venue: London Palladium
- Genre: Vocal jazz
- Length: 41:23
- Label: Reprise
- Producer: Alan A. Freeman

Sammy Davis Jr. chronology
The Shelter of Your Arms (1964)	Sammy Davis Jr. Salutes the Stars of the London Palladium (1964)	When the Feeling Hits You! (1965)

Professional ratings
Review scores
Source	Rating
AllMusic	4/5 stars

Sammy Davis Jr. Salutes the Stars of the London Palladium is an album by Sammy Davis Jr., recorded in 1964 as a tribute to artists who have performed at the London Palladium. Davis had just performed a five-week stint at the Palladium, and the album was recorded in London.

== Chart performance ==
The album debuted on Billboard magazine's Top LP's chart in the issue dated March 14, 1964, peaking at No. 139 during a three-week run on the chart.

== Track listing ==
1. "Introduction by Sammy Davis Jr." – 0:56
2. "My Kind of Girl" (Leslie Bricusse) – 4:07
3. "Sophisticated Lady" (Duke Ellington, Irving Mills, Mitchell Parish) – 3:57
4. "Ballin' the Jack" (James Henry Burris, Chris Smith) – 2:15
5. "Over the Rainbow" (Harold Arlen, Yip Harburg) – 4:10
6. "(Here I Am) Brokenhearted" (Lew Brown, Ray Henderson) – 3:46
7. "Jalousie" (Vera Bloom, Jacob Gade) – 4:09
8. "Smile" (Charlie Chaplin, John Turner, Geoffrey Parsons) – 2:40
9. "This Was My Love" (Jim Harbert) – 4:24
10. "(Up a) Lazy River" (Sidney Arodin, Hoagy Carmichael) – 2:55
11. "Give Me the Moonlight" (Lew Brown, Albert Von Tilzer) – 2:19
12. "Tenement Symphony" (Hal Borne, Sid Kuller, Ray Golden) – 5:16

== Personnel ==
- Sammy Davis Jr. – vocals
- Peter Knight – arrangement, conductor
