= Circle 1: Live in Germany Concert =

Live album by Circle
- Released: 1971
- Recorded: November 28, 1970
- Venue: Parktheater Iserlohn, West Germany
- Genre: Free jazz
- Label: CBS/Sony Japan; SOPL 19-XJ
- Producer: Kiyoshi Itoh

Circle chronology
Circle 1: Live in Germany Concert (1971)	Circle 2: Gathering (1971)

Circle 1: Live in Germany Concert (also issued as Circle 1: Live in German Concert) is a live album by Circle, a free jazz quartet that featured multi-instrumentalist Anthony Braxton, pianist Chick Corea, double bassist Dave Holland, and drummer Barry Altschul. It was recorded by German radio on November 28, 1970, in Iserlohn, West Germany, during an extended European tour that also took the group to the Netherlands, Belgium, and France, and was released on vinyl in 1971 by CBS/Sony Japan. Along with Circle 2: Gathering, the album was reissued on CD by Corea's Stretch label during the 1990s.

The album features two compositions by Holland, "Toy Room" and "Q and A" (incorrectly listed as "O and A"), presented as a medley, followed by the jazz standard "There Is No Greater Love". All three pieces would later appear on the live album Paris Concert, recorded during February 1971 and released by ECM in 1972.

== Reception ==
Professional ratings
Review scores
Source	Rating
Pitchfork	8.1/10 stars

Pitchfork's Seth Colter Walls stated that, in comparison with the music on Paris Concert, Live in Germany finds the group "push[ing] prettiness and aggression to greater extremes." He wrote: "In addition to the timbral intensity of the performance, the quick juggling of such different sound styles has its own hardcore feel. And when the band relents, they keep the experimental vibe afloat by rustling around with miscellaneous percussion instruments and whistles."

Regarding the CD reissue, Joseph Neff of The Vinyl District noted that the availability of the album "substantially improves our current musical situation," in that it helps to "capture pianist Chick Corea's too brief immersion into the avant-garde."

Author Bob Gluck stated that the rendition of "There Is No Greater Love" "runs the gamut of possible ways this band could address a jazz standard, from remaining close to the chord changes, invoking them, ignoring them, and using the spirit of the tune as a departure point for open improvisation." He commented: "Corea, Braxton, and Holland deliver extended solos, followed by a saxophone and drums duet, each its own composition, yet serving as one portion of a larger, integrated whole."

== Track listing ==
1. "Medley: Toy Room / Q and A" (incorrectly listed as "O and A") (Dave Holland) – 28:02
2. "There Is No Greater Love" (Isham Jones, Marty Symes) – 21:06

== Personnel ==
- Anthony Braxton – alto saxophone, soprano saxophone, flute, bass clarinet, percussion
- Chick Corea – piano
- Dave Holland – double bass, cello
- Barry Altschul – drums
