= Erik Charell =

German theatre and film director, dancer and actor

- Born: Erich Karl Löwenberg; 8 April 1894; Breslau, German Empire
- Died: 15 July 1974 (aged 80); Munich, West Germany
- Occupations: Actor, director

Erich Karl Löwenberg (8 April 1894 – 15 July 1974), known as Erik Charell, was a German theatre and film director, dancer and actor. He is best known as the creator of musical revues and operettas, such as The White Horse Inn (Im weißen Rössl) and The Congress Dances (Der Kongress tanzt).

== Life and career ==
Charell was born as Erich Karl Löwenberg in Breslau. He was the first child of Jewish parents Markus Löwenberg and Ida Korach. He also had a sister, Betti, who was born in 1886, and a younger brother named Ludwig, who was born in 1889 and later became Charell's manager.

Charell studied dance in Berlin. He was discovered, according to his own account, by the press in 1913 during a performance of the ballet-pantomime Venezianische Abenteuer eines jungen Mannes by playwright Karl Vollmöller in a production of director Max Reinhardt at the Deutsches Theater in Berlin. He founded his own company, the Charell-Ballett, and toured Europe during and after the World War I. The musical director of his company was the young Friedrich Hollaender (later a famous film composer.) In two silent movies, Paul Leni's Prince Cuckoo (1919) and Richard Oswald's Figures of the Night (1920) he demonstrated his brilliance as an actor. Reinhardt appointed Charell as assistant stage manager for the tour production of Vollmöller's The Miracle in New York in 1923. After his return to Germany in 1924, Charell and his brother Ludwig were offered to take over the management of the Großes Schauspielhaus in Berlin, which belonged to Reinhardt's theatre empire, the so called Reinhardt Bühnen.

In 1924 Charell presented his first revue, An Alle. He managed to engage the "Tiller Girls", an internationally famous girl group from London. His aim was to mix German operetta with exotic ingredients such as jazz, "negro music" and "the most enchanting Dancing-Girls with divine legs", in order to show that revue made in Berlin could be "as contemporary as the jazz band, that turns the Siegmund-jodeling and Siegfried-screaching to laughter" and is "as modern as Mozart or the mini-automobile", as Charell's personal friend and PR genius Alfred Flechtheim phrased it in the 1924 article "Vom Ballet zur Revue" in the magazine Der Querschnitt. "Charell wants us to witness the many different facets from all around the world".

This show was followed by the revues Für Dich (1925) and Von Mund zu Mund (1926), which were arranged by composer Ralph Benatzky and contained music by Irving Berlin, Jerome Kern and many others.

After the series of revues, Charell began adapting classic operettas such as The Mikado, Wie einst im Mai, Madame Pompadour and Die lustige Witwe and turned them into modern jazzy revue operettas, claiming that he needed a plot line for his show, that had been missing in the pure revues before. A few years later, he decided to create his very own operettas with composer Ralph Benatzky. Together they wrote the trilogy of historical revue-operettas, which made Charell famous to this day: Casanova (1928), Die drei Musketiere (1929) and The White Horse Inn (Im weißen Rößl, 1930). Especially The White Horse Inn was one of the most successful creations of Charell's career. In the following years he himself staged the show in London (1931), Paris (1932) and New York (1936), where each production was newly conceived, the script translated differently, and new music and instrumentation were added in some parts.

Many actors and singers, such as Marlene Dietrich, Joseph Schmidt, Max Hansen and Camilla Spira, who all became famous later, first appeared in major roles in Charell productions. Charell also discovered the boy group Comedian Harmonists and presented them for the first time in Casanova at the Große Schauspielhaus. The reaction of the international press was positive, The New York Times noting that "Erik Charell seems to have done it again. 'Casanova', his latest operetta production at the Grosses Schauspielhaus, is filling this huge circus to its stylized rafters". After this string of stage successes, Charell moved on to the new and innovative genre of sound film operetta. In 1931, Universum Film AG (Ufa) producer Erich Pommer invited Charell to direct Der Kongreß tanzt, (sets by Ernst Stern, music by Werner Richard Heymann), one of the most successful films of the early era of sound film, with one review in The New York Times saying that "[it] is a stupendous pictorial film. [...] it is [...] an exceptional film entertainment. The director, Erik Charell, is the Ziegfeld of the German musical comedy stage" and another noting that "It is a charming spectacle of Vienna in 1814, filled with tuneful melodies that one likes to remember and blessed with pleasing light comedy". The international success of Der Kongreß tanzt led to an engagement in Hollywood, where Charell directed the movie Caravan, again with sets by Ernst Stern and music by Werner Richard Heymann.

When the Nazis took over in January 1933, the Ufa immediately annulled their contract with Charell because of his Jewish descent. They also cancelled all plans for two further contractually agreed upon film projects, one a film operetta based on the Odyssey with Hans Albers in the male lead. Three years later a German court even sentenced Charell to return the 26.000 Reichsmark, which had been paid to him as an advance. When Caravan flopped in the US and internationally, his Hollywood career and all other American film projects came to an immediate halt. The New York Times noted "If lyric loveliness and photographic charm were all a picture needed to keep an audience enthralled, Mr. Charell could be toasted in good tokay this morning, and 'Caravan' could be applauded until the bottle is dry. But the sober fact is that the new film is an exceptionally tedious enterprise". One of the cancelled projects was a film about ballet dancer Vaslav Nijinsky for Metro-Goldwyn-Mayer (MGM). It would have been an interesting project, since Charell in his dancing days was often compared by the German press to Nijinsky.

In 1936, Charell staged a successful Broadway production of White Horse Inn. The New York Times noted that it "involves mountain scenery and hotel architecture, costumes beautiful and varied enough to bankrupt a designer's imagination, choruses that can do anything from the hornpipe to a resounding slap-dance, grand processionals with royalty loitering before the commoners, a steamboat, a yacht, a char-à-banc, four real cows and a great deal more of the same. Indeed, the enthusiasm with which 'White Horse Inn' has been created has virtually transformed the enormous Center Theatre into a Tyrol village". The Daily Mirror mentioned that "it is difficult to give you an idea of the immensity of 'White Horse Inn'. It is gargantuan. It is the Queen Mary of extravaganzas. [...] It boasts acres of settings, hundreds of performers. It is a grand and glittering sight for the eyes." There was even talk of a film version with Eddie Cantor as the head waiter. (Warner Brothers were co-producers of the Broadway staging.)

Spurred by the success of White Horse Inn, Charell adapted Shakespeare's A Midsummer Night's Dream as a jazz operetta and presented it as Swinging the Dream on Broadway at the Center Theatre in 1939. It was a daring and innovative production, because Charell used only black actors and singers, including Louis Armstrong, Count Basie, Maxine Sullivan, Moms Mabley, Dorothy Dandridge and Butterfly McQueen. Furthermore, the stage sets were based on Walt Disney motifs. Music was written for the production by Jimmy van Heusen but songs included in the show came from the greatest African-American composers and songwriters in jazz: W. C. Handy, Thomas "Fats" Waller, Count Basie and many others. Benny Goodman conducted his own sextet and the choreography was by Agnes de Mille. But the production closed after only 13 performances, mainly because white Broadway audiences (and, perhaps more importantly, racist reviewers) of the time were not "ready" for an all-black cast. A review in The New York Times described the show as a "negro carnival", noting that "between Shakespeare and Goodman, Goodman wins". It's likely that the timing of the opening had a great deal to do with the lack of success of "Swingin'"; by opening night - 29 November 1939 - World War II was in full swing; it would have been difficult for audiences to enjoy an escapist musical fantasy while events in Europe were becoming more and more horrifying with every passing hour. [A re-creation of the show was streamed online during the COVID-19 pandemic in a collaboration between the Royal Shakespeare Company and Young Vic of London, England and Theatre for a New Audience of New York, New York on 9 January 2021.]

After the war, Charell returned to Europe. In Munich he had a big success with the musical comedy Feuerwerk (music by Paul Burkhard) at the Staatstheater am Gärtnerplatz. The song O mein Papa became an international hit. In the 1950s, Charell created a stage version of Der Kongreß tanzt, which was performed in France, but the French public was not enthusiastic. His two big film productions were The White Horse Inn with Nazi operetta star Johannes Heesters in 1952, and Fireworks with Lilli Palmer and the young Romy Schneider in 1954. After failing to write a sequel to The White Horse Inn with his original librettist Robert Gilbert, Charell spend most of his time of the 1960s buying and selling art. Together with his brother Ludwig he owned a collection of Toulouse-Lautrec-lithographs, which was exhibited in Canada in 1953 and in other major museums of the world.

In 1969 he received the German movie prize, the Filmband in Gold, for his "excellent works and outstanding contributions to the history of the German movie". He died on 15 July 1974 in Munich and was cremated on the Eastern cemetery. In his obituary it says: "28 friends gave him the last farewell in the city, to which he had a special love. A movie producer spoke to his memories, and to honour this charmer, who consciously and prudently managed his graceful talents, the triumph march of Verdi's opera 'Aida' sounded across the cemetery". The urn was interred in a cemetery in Grünwald near Munich. Charell's partner Friedrich Zanner and Dr. Wolf Schwarz, a lawyer and friend, were appointed to manage the estate and the personal property.

His collection of Lautrec-lithographs was sold by Sotheby's in 1978.

The Schwules Museum Berlin dedicated an exhibition to Charell and his work from 7 July to 27 September 2010. It was curated by Kevin Clarke.

On 18 November 2015, Friedrichstadt-Palast Berlin inaugurated a memorial at Friedrichstraße 107 dedicated to the theatre's founders, Max Reinhardt, Hans Poelzig and Erik Charell.

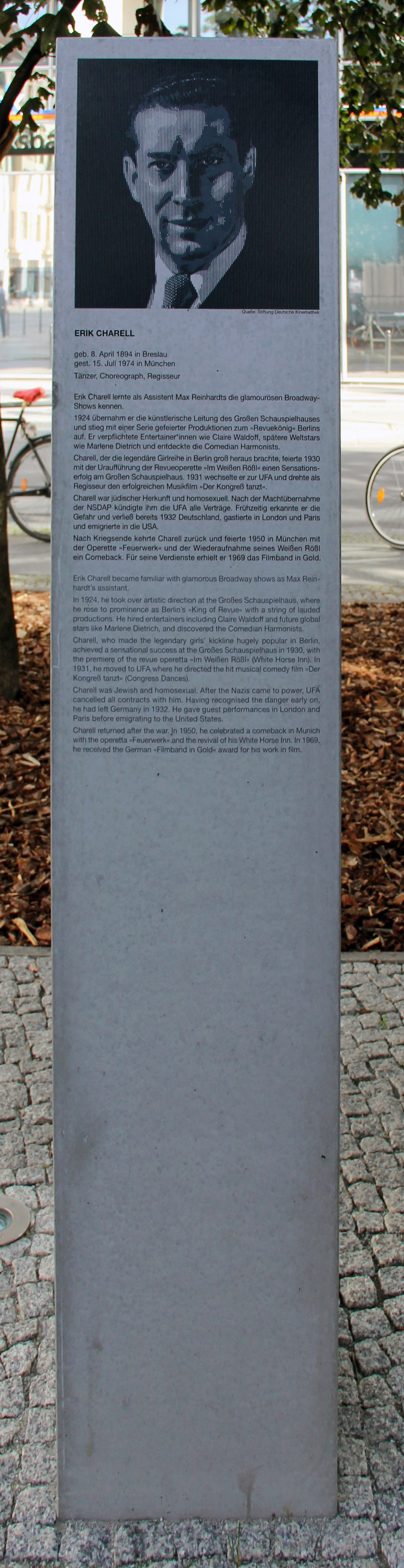
Memorial plaque at Friedrichstraße 107 in Mitte-Berlin.

== Nudity on stage ==
When Charell visited New York for the first time, working at the Century Theatre for Max Reinhardt, he was impressed and inspired by the American revues, especially the Ziegfeld Follies on Broadway. He decided, upon his return to Berlin, to combine European operetta music with the music and ideas of the American music theatre, to create a more 'cosmopolitan German' style. He established a revue style in which "word, sound, image, costume, colour, the art of illumination [work together] as a single rousing burning mirror". Charell wanted to make "modern" pieces and bring them to Germany to challenge the conservative mindset, which still prevailed in Europe after the First World War ("Germany is still suffering from the blockage. After being isolated from the rest of the world for ten years, it finally needs to breathe freely and realize what was going on in those ten long years, not only in science [...], but also in things, which take a look on the bright side of life"). His way of using contemporary syncopated music – from the German charts and the USA (the first European performance of Gershwin's Rhapsody in Blue took place within Charell's first revue, An Alle) –, the risqué jokes and the inclusion of attractive boy groups (dancing and singing) in addition to the then standard heterosexual display of female nudity were all new to the Berlin theatre scene. He also presented renowned Lesbian stars such as Claire Waldoff to draw in additional crowds.

Especially the sexually provocative sketches between the songs made his reviews and revue operettas famous. The comedians Claire Waldoff and Wilhelm Bendow were hired to perform slapstick and dialectic humour similar of the likes of Charlie Chaplin and Karl Valentin. They provided an ironic view on different topics and cheeky 'hidden' references to e.g. sex practices of heteros and homosexuals. Besides, there were also jokes about sexuality woven into the song texts by the lyricists. This made the heterosexual audience laugh, especially those who understood the insider jokes, and it especially catered to the homosexual crowd. Bendow was particularly famous for his camp acting and double entendres. Furthermore, on Charell used sexually suggestive imagery, like in Von Mund zu Mund in which ancient Roman soldiers were portrayed semi-naked holding lances and swords.

Charell revolutionized the German musical theatre by developing the idea of 'staged nudity' further than had been standard until then. He discovered modern female chorus lines in New York and was the first to bring them to Berlin, where they fuelled his stunning success. When the other theatre managers tried to copy Charell and also hired female chorus groups, they presented them as nude as possible. While the fight over who had the 'most naked' women in Berlin was raging, Charell's staging of nudity moved into a wholly different direction: when the audience became tired and bored of a straightforward display of naked bodies ("Yes, we are all pretty tired of those flesh exhibitions. The audience is sated with thighs. Not to mention, how fed up we are of the mass display of female bosoms."), he started to artfully arrange the nudity. Charell wanted "to reawaken aesthetic feelings" in the spectator "by artistic composition". In addition and as a contrast to the omnipresent female nudity, Charell also hired boy groups, e.g. the Tyrolean dancers, the "Schuhplattler and Watschentänzer", for Im weißen Rössl, or the "Jackson" and the "Sunshine Boys". In the first case homoeroticism is quite obvious, the tabloid newspaper BZ am Mittag noting "juicy guys in leather trousers, who slap each other in time. [...] My God, they have the right cheeks for it!"

Charell also used famous male sex symbols in his operettas, like Alfred Jerger, Max Hansen and Siegfried Arno, the latter doing a famous striptease in The Three Musketeers when comparing his battle wounds with the others, critic Erich Urban noted that "when [Arno] unveils his perforated body to Hansen [...] the whole theatre screams and gasp, not just the upper balconies". Im weißen Rössl contains a similar scene, in which Arno presents himself as a "gorgeous bathing beauty" and undresses, before plunging into the Wolfgangsee.

Even though Charell's revues were inspired by America and England, this kind of nudity and sexual liberation was only found in Berlin during the Roaring Twenties. After 1933, the Nazis suppressed such most of the sexual freedom in operetta, because it was seen as "Jewish" and "degenerate". Unfortunately, 1945 the German operetta scene never returned to the liberated ideals of the 1920s and adapted many of the famous shows from that era to fit the new 'innocent' style of the post-war period. This eventually led Charell to leave the theatre and film business entirely, and focus on his art collection instead.

== Film and stage work ==
=== Actor ===
- 1919 Prince Cuckoo, Director: Paul Leni
- 1920 Figures of the Night, Director: Richard Oswald

=== Stage director ===
- 1924 An Alle! "Die große Schau im großen Schauspielhaus in zwei Akten und zwanzig Bildern", with music by Ralph Benatzky, Irving Berlin, Jerome Kern et al.
- 1925 Für Dich (revue)
- 1926 Von Mund zu Mund (revue)
- 1927 Der Mikado (adaptation of the Gilbert & Sullivan opera)
- 1927 Madame Pompadour (adaptation of the Leo Fall operetta)
- 1928 Die lustige Witwe (adaptation of the Franz Lehár operetta by Rudolph Schanzer and Ernst Welisch, with Fritzi Massary and Max Hansen in the leading roles)
- 1928 Casanova, with music by Ralph Benatzky and Johann Strauss, at the Grosse Schauspielhaus Berlin, with Michael Bohnen in the title role
- 1929 Drei Musketiere, with music by Ralph Benatzky, at the Grosse Schauspielhaus Berlin, with Alfred Jerger, Max Hansen, La Jana and Siegfried Arno
- 1930 Im weißen Rössl, with music by Ralph Benatzky, at the Grosse Schauspielhaus Berlin, with Max Hansen, Siegfried Arno and Camilla Spira
- 1936 The White Horse Inn, with Kitty Carlisle at the Center Theatre, New York
- 1939 Swingin' the Dream, with music by Jimmy Van Heusen
- 1950 Feuerwerk, with music by Paul Burkhard, at the Staatstheater am Gärtnerplatz

=== Film director ===
- 1931 Der Kongreß tanzt, with Lilian Harvey, Willy Fritsch, Conrad Veidt and Lil Dagover, music by Werner Richard Heymann
- 1934 Caravan, with Charles Boyer and Loretta Young, music by Werner Richard Heymann

=== Producer ===
- 1952 The White Horse Inn (dir. Willi Forst), with Johannes Heesters
- 1954 Fireworks (dir. Kurt Hoffmann), with Lilli Palmer, Karl Schönböck and Romy Schneider
