= Fireworks (1954 film) =

1954 film

- Austrian release poster
- Feuerwerk
- Directed by: Kurt Hoffmann
- Written by: Jürg Amstein (play); Erik Charell (play); Felix Lützkendorf; Günter Neumann; Herbert Witt
- Produced by: Erik Charell; Conrad Flockner; Georg Richter
- Starring: Lilli Palmer; Karl Schönböck; Romy Schneider
- Cinematography: Günther Anders
- Edited by: Claus von Boro
- Music by: Paul Burkhard
- Production company: N.D.F. Produktion
- Distributed by: Schorcht Filmverleih
- Release date: 16 September 1954
- Running time: 97 minutes
- Country: West Germany
- Language: German

Fireworks (German: Feuerwerk) is a 1954 West German period musical comedy film directed by Kurt Hoffmann and starring Lilli Palmer, Karl Schönböck, and Romy Schneider. Palmer's rendition of the song "O mein Papa" became a major hit. It was Palmer's debut film in her native Germany, having spent many years in exile in Britain, and launched her career as a major star in the country.

The film is based on the 1950 stage musical Das Feuerwerk partly written by Erik Charell. It was made at the Bavaria Studios in Munich and on location in Switzerland. The film's sets were designed by the art director Werner Schlichting.

It is a circus film set at the beginning of the twentieth century.

== Cast ==
- Lilli Palmer as Iduna
- Karl Schönböck as Alexander Oberholzer
- Romy Schneider as Anna Oberholzer
- Claus Biederstaedt as Robert
- Werner Hinz as Albert Oberholzer
- Rudolf Vogel as Onkel Gustav, an uncle
- Margarete Haagen as Kathi
- Ernst Waldow as Onkel Wilhelm
- Liesl Karlstadt as Tante Berta, an aunt
- Käthe Haack as Karoline Oberholzer
- Lina Carstens as Tante Paula
- Michl Lang as Onkel Fritz
- Charlotte Witthauer as Tante Alwine
- Tatjana Sais as Madame Sperling
- Willy Reichert as Bahnhofsvorsteher (that is station master)
- Hans Clarin as ein Zirkusangestellter (works at the circus)
- Michael Cramer as sein Kollege (works at the circus, too)
- Christiane Maybach as Jasmine
- Klaus Pohl as Piepereit

== Bibliography ==
- Bock, Hans-Michael; Bergfelder, Tim, eds. (2009). The Concise Cinegraph: Encyclopaedia of German Cinema. New York: Berghahn Books. ISBN 978-1-57181-655-9.
