= Das Feuerwerk =

1950 musical comedy by Paul Burkhard

- Musical comedy by Paul Burkhard
- Translation: The Firework
- Librettist: Erik Charell; Jürg Amstein; Robert Gilbert
- Language: German
- Based on: Der schwarze Hecht
- Premiere: 16 May 1950; Staatstheater am Gärtnerplatz, Munich

Das Feuerwerk (The Firework) is a musical comedy in three acts by Paul Burkhard. It is a Standard German version of the Swiss German comedy Der schwarze Hecht which premiered in 1939 at Schauspielhaus Zürich, and originally draws inspiration from the comedy De sächzigscht Giburtstag by Emil Sautter. The libretto was written by Erik Charell, Jürg Amstein and Robert Gilbert. Das Feuerwerk premiered on 16 May 1950 at Staatstheater am Gärtnerplatz in Munich.

== Orchestra and vocal roles ==
The work is orchestrated for a flute (doubling a piccolo), an oboe, two clarinets, a bassoon, two French horns, two trumpets, a trombone, a harp, a piano and strings. To perform in a smaller theatre, the composer also gave the option for two pianos and percussion, and even the latter can be left out. The work is set for singing actors.

The roles are as follows:

- Albert Oberholzer, factory owner
- Karline Oberholzer, his wife
- Anna, their daughter
- Kati, the Oberholzers' cook
- Josef, household help
- Fritz Oberholzer, farmer
- Berta, his wife
- Gustav Oberholzer, councillor
- Paula, his wife
- Heinrich Oberholzer, professor
- Klara, his wife
- Alexander Oberholzer, alias circus director Obolski
- Iduna, his wife
- Herbert Klusmann, ship owner
- Lisa, his wife
- Robert, the Oberholzers' gardener (in love with Anna)
- A groom
- circus audience, including children

In the abbreviated version, the roles of Heinrich, Klara, Herbert and Lisa are combined into two people, whereby Heinrich's wife is called Lisa.

== Plot ==
The musical comedy is set in the villa and garden of factory owner Albert Oberholzer, at the start of the twentieth century. Oberholzer is celebrating his 60th birthday with his family ( in some settings it is his 50th birthday being celebrated). Preparations are well under way. Anna, Oberholzer's daughter, is rehearsing a song written especially for the occasion with Kati, the household cook. Aunt Berta and her husband Fritz arrive first. Anna and Kati have scarcely restarted their rehearsal when the arrival of Aunt Paula with Uncle Gustav and Aunt Lisa with Uncle Heinrich disturbs them again.

After the greetings, Anna and Kati want to perform their song, but another arrival interrupts them, that of Oberholzer's brother Alexander, the black sheep of the family, with his wife Iduna. Alexander has become the director of a travelling circus and calls himself Obolski; he has much with which to regale. His wife Iduna tells of her father's talents as a clown.

In a dream scene, Anna's aunts appear as the circus's big cats in an arena. The uncles, acting as clowns, make the audience laugh. Iduna rides a horse and Anna swings on a trapeze. Anna decides to run away with the circus. Robert cannot understand the actions of his beloved, but this does not change her mind. The men of the party dance around Iduna and shower her with compliments.

Iduna confides in Anna that behind the glamour of the circus there is also a darker side, and that she craves a more permanent existence. Anna recognises that she is perhaps not made for the travelling life. Her father is so delighted with her change of mind that he finally gives his approval for her engagement to Robert.

== Musical highlights ==
Das Feuerwerk was Paul Burkhard's most successful work. The song "O mein Papa" became particularly famous; an English-language version by Eddie Fisher "Oh! My Pa-Pa" made it to Number One in the US in 1954.

Further well-known songs were

- "Ich hab' ein kleines süsses Pony" (I have a sweet little pony)
- "Ich sag' es gern durch die Blume" (I'm happy to say it among the flowers)
- "Ein Leben lang verliebt" (A lifetime in love)
- "Die Welt ist gross und weit" (The world is great and wide)

The work, which was published under the genre of musical comedy, is reminiscent both in music and subject of American musicals and therefore marks a departure from the traditional operetta in German theatre entertainment of the 1950s.

== Film adaptations ==
The 1954 film adaptation by director Kurt Hoffmann starred Lilli Palmer, Romy Schneider, Karl Schönböck and Claus Biederstaedt.
