= Kevin Clark =

Kevin Clark may refer to:

- Kevin Clark (American football) (born 1964), American football player
- Kevin Clark (poet) (born 1950), American poet
- Kevin Clark (basketball) (born 1958), assistant men's basketball coach at the University of Rhode Island
- Kevin Clark (ice hockey) (born 1987), Canadian professional ice hockey player
- Kevin Clark (actor) (1988–2021), American child actor and musician known for School of Rock
- Kevin Clark (trumpeter), trumpet player with the Dukes of Dixieland
- Kevin P. Clark, former Baltimore Police commissioner
- Kevin Clark (jazz musician) (1940–2026), South African-born, New Zealand jazz musician and architect, winner of Best Jazz Album in the 2003 in New Zealand § Music Awards

== See also ==
- Kevin Clarke (disambiguation)
