= Kevin Clarke =

Kevin Clarke may refer to:

- Kevin Clarke (Irish footballer) (1921–1990), Irish soccer player
- Kevin Clarke (politician), candidate for public office in Toronto, Ontario, Canada
- Kevin Clarke (writer), English writer
- Kevin Clarke (music historian) (born 1967), Irish-German music historian
- Kevin Clarke (footballer, born 1931) (1931–2009), Australian rules footballer for Melbourne and Carlton
- Kevin Clarke (footballer, born 1932) (1932–1993), Australian rules footballer for Collingwood

== See also ==
- Kevin Clark (disambiguation)
