= Do Nothing till You Hear from Me =

Song by Duke Ellington and Bob Russell

"Do Nothing till You Hear from Me" (also written as "Do Nothin' Til You Hear from Me") is a song with music by Duke Ellington and lyrics by Bob Russell. It originated as a 1940 instrumental ("Concerto for Cootie") that was designed to highlight the playing of Ellington's lead trumpeter, Cootie Williams; Russell's words were added later. In 1944, Ellington's own recording of the song was a number one hit on the Harlem Hit Parade chart for eight non-consecutive weeks and number six on the pop chart.

Other recordings of the song that reached the Billboard charts in 1944 were by Woody Herman and by Stan Kenton (vocal: Red Dorris).

== Other versions ==
"Do Nothing till You Hear from Me" has since been performed by many other famous musical artists, including:

- Nat King Cole, 1944, with The King Cole Trio
- Billie Holiday, 1944 – Live, 1955, Studio, Stay With Me
- Lena Horne, 1944, appears on her 2002 compilation album The Young Star
- Patti Page, 1949, released in 1986 on The Uncollected Patti Page (1949): Patti Page with Lou Stein's Music
- Hampton Hawes, 1956 – All Night Session! Vol. 3
- Bing Crosby recorded the song in 1957 for use on his radio show and it was subsequently included in the album Shall We Dance? (2012).
- Ella Fitzgerald, 1957, Ella Fitzgerald Sings the Duke Ellington Song Book
- Mose Allison, 1959 – Autumn Song
- Louis Armstrong and Duke Ellington, 1961, The Great Summit
- Nina Simone, 1962, Nina Simone Sings Ellington
- Dinah Washington, 1962, In Love
- Sammy Davis Jr. (with Sam Butera & the Witnesses, 1965, When the Feeling Hits You!
- Robert Palmer, 1992, Ridin' High
- Diana Krall, 1993, Stepping Out
- Tony Bennett, 1999, Bennett Sings Ellington: Hot & Cool
- Andy Williams, 2000, Released on his 2001 live album Andy Williams Live
- Mary J. Blige, 2001, Red Hot + Indigo
