= Sammy Davis Jr. Sings the Big Ones for Young Lovers =

Studio album by Sammy Davis Jr.
- Released: 1964
- Recorded: 1964
- Genre: Vocal jazz
- Length: 33:16
- Label: Reprise

Sammy Davis Jr. chronology
The Shelter of Your Arms (1964)	Sammy Davis Jr. Sings the Big Ones for Young Lovers (1964)	When the Feeling Hits You! (1965)

Professional ratings
Review scores
Source	Rating
AllMusic	4.5/5 stars

Sammy Davis Jr. Sings the Big Ones for Young Lovers is an album by Sammy Davis Jr. that was released in 1964 and arranged by Jimmie Haskell and Perry Botkin Jr.

== Track listing ==
1. "Kansas City" (Leiber and Stoller) – 2:48
2. "Don't Shut Me Out" (Stephanie Louis) – 2:30
3. "Deep Purple" (Peter DeRose, Mitchell Parish) – 3:08
4. "Walk Right In" (Gus Cannon, Hosea Woods) – 2:45
5. "I Left My Heart in San Francisco" (George Cory, Douglass Cross) – 2:25
6. "Choose" (Lionel Bart) – 2:49
7. "Days of Wine and Roses" (Henry Mancini, Johnny Mercer) – 2:37
8. "Blue Velvet" (Lee Morris, Bernie Wayne) – 2:46
9. "Not for Me" (Bobby Darin) – 2:53
10. "I Wanna Be Around" (Mercer, Sadie Vimmerstadt) – 2:36
11. "It's All in the Game" (Charles G. Dawes, Carl Sigman) – 3:00
12. "Fools Rush In" (Rube Bloom, Mercer) – 2:42

== Personnel ==
- Sammy Davis Jr. – vocals
- Jimmie Haskell – arrangement, conductor
- Perry Botkin Jr.
