= Prince Cuckoo =

1919 film directed by Paul Leni

- Directed by: Paul Leni
- Written by: Otto Julius Bierbaum (novel); Georg Kaiser
- Produced by: Hanns Lippmann
- Starring: Conrad Veidt; Olga Limburg; Magnus Stifter
- Cinematography: Carl Hoffmann
- Music by: Friedrich Hollaender
- Production company: Gloria-Film
- Release date: 26 September 1919
- Running time: 99 minutes
- Country: Germany
- Languages: Silent; German intertitles

Prince Cuckoo (German: Prinz Kuckuck) is a 1919 German silent drama film directed by Paul Leni and starring Conrad Veidt, Olga Limburg, and Magnus Stifter. It premiered at the Marmorhaus. It is now considered a lost film.

It was shot at the Babelsberg Studios in Berlin. The film's sets were designed by the art directors Karl Machus and Otto Moldenhauer along with Leni.

== Cast ==
- Conrad Veidt as Karl Kraker
- Niels Prien as Henry Felix
- Olga Limburg as Sara Asher
- Magnus Stifter as Fürst Wladimir Golkow
- Max Gülstorff as Meister Sturmius
- Paul Biensfeldt as Jeremias Kraker
- Wilhelm Diegelmann as Bauer Schirmer
- Fritz Junkermann
- Toni Zimmerer
- Max Ruhbeck
- Günther Herrmann
- Hanna Ralph
- Margarete Kupfer as Sanna Kraker
- Gertrud Wolle as Frau Hauart
- Blandine Ebinger
- Agnes Wilke
- Margarete Schlegel as Tochter der Marchesa
- Anneliese Halbe as Berta
- Erik Charell as Tiberio
- Henri Peters-Arnolds
- Marga von Kierska

== Bibliography ==
- Soister, John T. (2002). Conrad Veidt on Screen: A Comprehensive Illustrated Filmography. Jefferson, NC: McFarland. ISBN 978-0-7864-1289-1.
