= O mein Papa =

Popular German song

"Oh! My Pa-Pa"
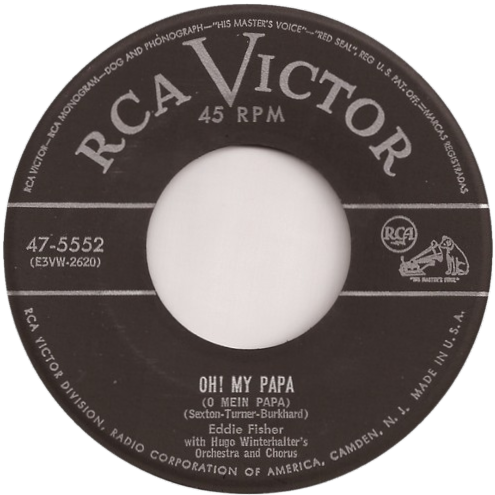

Single by Eddie Fisher with Hugo Winterhalter's Orchestra and Chorus
- B-side: "Until You Said Goodbye"
- Released: December 12, 1953
- Studio: Webster Hall, New York City
- Genre: Ballad
- Length: 3:04
- Label: RCA Victor
- Composer: Paul Burkhard
- Lyricists: John Turner and Geoffrey Parsons
- Producer: Hugo Winterhalter

Eddie Fisher with Hugo Winterhalter's Orchestra and Chorus singles chronology
"Many Times" (1953)	"Oh! My Pa-Pa" (1953)	"A Girl, A Girl (Zoom-Ba Di Alli Nella)" (1954)

"O mein Papa" is a nostalgic German song, originally as related by a young woman remembering her beloved, once-famous clown father. It was written by Swiss composer Paul Burkhard in 1939 for the musical Der schwarze Hecht (The Black Pike) and reproduced in 1950 as Das Feuerwerk (The Firework) to a libretto by Erik Charell, Jürg Amstein, and Robert Gilbert. In 1954 that musical was turned into the film Fireworks with Lilli Palmer.

The song was recorded in English as "Oh! My Papa" by several artists, including Eddie Fisher whose version was a number one hit in the US in 1954 and gained him a gold record for selling over one-million copies.

== Recordings ==
=== At Abbey Road Studios ===
An instrumental version of "Oh, mein Papa" was released by trumpeter Eddie Calvert in late 1953. It topped the UK Singles Chart in 1954, and was also a Top 10 hit in the United States. Calvert's version was also the first UK number one hit recorded at Abbey Road Studios. The song returned to Abbey Road when Brian Fahey conducted an instrumental version in 1960, to be used as a backing track for Connie Francis' English-Yiddish recording for her album Connie Francis Sings Jewish Favorites. Francis overdubbed her vocals in Hollywood. In June 1966, Francis overdubbed the same playback once more, this time with the original German lyrics for her German concept album Melodien, die die Welt erobern.

=== Eddie Fisher version ===
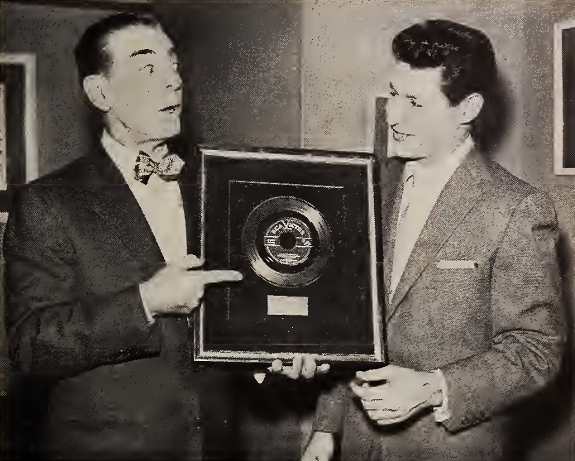
Eddie Cantor handing Eddie Fisher a gold record for Fisher's single "Oh! My Pa-Pa" on January 6, 1954.

It was adapted into English by John Turner and Geoffrey Parsons under the title "Oh! My Pa-Pa". A recording by Eddie Fisher with Hugo Winterhalter's orchestra and chorus that was made at Webster Hall, New York City, was released backed with "Until You Said Goodbye". It was released by RCA Victor Records as catalog number 20-5552 (in US) and by EMI on the His Master's Voice label as catalog number B 10614. It debuted on the Billboard chart on December 12, 1953, and this recording became a No. 1 hit on the U.S. Billboard chart in 1954. The single sold over one million copies and earned Fisher a gold record. It also set an all-time record in the label; "Oh! My Pa-Pa" sold over 250 thousand copies in one week.

Fisher's version also made the UK Top 10; thus, in the UK, Calvert's version was number one in the UK while Fisher's made the top 10, but missed the top spot, and in the U.S., the opposite occurred.

=== Other notable versions ===
The song has been performed and recorded by numerous artists since its debut, including Lys Assia, Siouxsie and the Banshees (on Join Hands (1979), as "Mother/Oh Mein Papa"), Björk (on Gling-Gló, as "Pabbi minn"), Rolf Harris (on The BBC Rolf Harris Show LP on Columbia OSX6216 in 1968, as "O Mein Papa, sung in the original German), and many others. The opening stanza was momentarily quoted in Frank Zappa's song "Billy the Mountain" (1972) in place of the word "fissure", a reference to Eddie Fisher. The song was in the episode "Like Father, Like Clown" of The Simpsons sung by Krusty the Clown.

== Lyrics ==
=== English lyrics ===
Oh, my Papa, to me he was so wonderful.
Oh, my Papa, to me he was so good.
No one could be so gentle and so lovable.
Oh, my Papa, he always understood.

Oh, my Papa, so funny, so adorable,
Always the clown so funny in his way.
Oh, my Papa, to me he was so wonderful.
Deep in my heart, I miss him so today.

Gone are the days when he would take me on his knee.
And with a smile, he'd change my tears to laughter.

=== German lyrics ===
The original German version of the song contains passages that more fully give the context to the listener; these do not appear in the English translation. It contains grammar errors (confusing masculine and feminine nouns and adjectives) and is sung with a foreign accent appropriate for the role of the Eastern European woman it is written for.

Papa wie ein Pfeil
sprang hinauf auf die Seil,
eh la hopp, eh la hopp, eh la hopp.
Er spreizte die Beine
ganz breit auseinand',
sprang hoch in die Luft
und stand auf die Hand.
Eh la hopp, eh la hopp, eh la hopp.

Er lachte: "Haha, haha"
und machte: "Hoho hoho",
ganz sachte: "Haha haha"
und rief: "Eh la hopp, eh la hopp
eh la hopp, eh la hopp
eh la hopp."

Er ritt auf die Seil
ganz hoch in die Luft
eh la hopp, eh la hopp, eh la hopp.
Das konnte er machen
zwölfmal in ohne Müh';
er lachte dazu
und fürchtet sich nie.
Eh la hopp, eh la hopp, eh la hopp,
eh la hopp, eh la hopp,
eh la hopp, eh la hopp.

Refrain:
Oh, mein Papa war eine wunderbare Clown.
Oh, mein Papa war eine große Kinstler.
Hoch auf die Seil, wie war er herrlich anzuschau'n!
Oh, mein Papa war eine schöne Mann.

Ei, wie er lacht,
sein Mund, sie sein so breit, so rot;
und seine Aug'
wie Diamanten strahlen.

Oh, mein Papa war eine wunderbare Clown.
Oh, mein Papa war eine große Kinstler.
Hoch auf die Seil, wie war er herrlich anzuschau'n!
Oh, mein Papa war eine schöne Mann.

Dann warf er sechs Bänder
hoch in die Luft
eh la hopp, eh la hopp, eh la hopp.
Er ließ sie tanzen
im feirigen Licht
und strahlte glicklich
im ganzen Gesicht.
Eh la hopp, eh la hopp, eh la hopp.

Er lachte: "Haha, haha"
und machte: "Hoho hoho",
ganz sachte: "Haha haha"
und rief: "Eh la hopp, eh la hopp
eh la hopp, eh la hopp
eh la hopp, eh la hopp
eh la hopp, eh la hopp."

Er warf die sechs Bänder
hoch in die Luft
eh la hopp, eh la hopp, eh la hopp.
Und alles das macht er
auf schwindlige Heh;
Papa war die Clou
von die ganz Soirée.
Eh la hopp, eh la hopp, eh la hopp,
eh la hopp, eh la hopp
eh la hopp, eh la hopp
eh la hopp, eh la hopp.

Refrain

Papa, like an arrow,
jumped up onto the ropes.
Alley-oop, alley-oop, alley-oop.
He spread his legs
apart very wide,
jumped high into the air,
and stood on his hand.
Alley-oop, alley-oop, alley-oop.

He laughed, "haha, haha"
and went, "hoho, hoho"
very gently, "haha, haha"
and shouted, "Alley-oop, alley-oop,
alley-oop, alley-oop,
alley-oop."

He rode the ropes
very high in the air.
Alley-oop, alley-oop, alley-oop.
He could do that
twelve times, effortlessly.
At this, he laughed
and was never afraid.
Alley-oop, alley-oop, alley-oop,
alley-oop, alley-oop,
alley-oop, alley-oop.

Refrain:
Oh, my Papa was a wonderful clown.
Oh, my Papa was a great artist.
High on the ropes, how wonderful it was to watch!
Oh, my Papa was a beautiful man.

Oh, how he laughed,
his mouth so wide, so red;
and his eyes
shined like diamonds.

Oh, my Papa was a wonderful clown.
Oh, my Papa was a great artist.
High on the ropes, how wonderful it was to watch!
Oh, my Papa was a beautiful man.

Then, he threw six ribbons
high in the air.
Alley-oop, alley-oop, alley-oop.
He made them dance
in the glowing light,
and beamed with happiness
all across his face.
Alley-oop, alley-oop, alley-oop.

He laughed, "haha, haha"
and went, "hoho, hoho"
very gently, "haha, haha"
and shouted, "Alley-oop, alley-oop,
alley-oop, alley-oop,
alley-oop, alley-oop,
alley-oop, alley-oop."

Then, he threw six ribbons
high in the air.
Alley-oop, alley-oop, alley-oop.
And he does all of that
at dizzying heights,
Papa was the highlight
of the whole soirée.
Alley-oop, alley-oop, alley-oop,
alley-oop, alley-oop,
alley-oop, alley-oop,
alley-oop, alley-oop.

Refrain

== See also ==
- List of UK Singles Chart number ones of the 1950s
- List of Billboard number-one singles of 1954
