= The Nat King Cole Songbook =

Studio album by Sammy Davis Jr.
- Released: 1965
- Recorded: 1965
- Genre: Vocal jazz
- Length: 39:48
- Label: Reprise
- Producer: Gordon Anderson

Sammy Davis Jr. chronology
If I Ruled the World (1965)	The Nat King Cole Songbook (1965)	Our Shining Hour (1965)

Professional ratings
Review scores
Source	Rating
Allmusic	4/5 stars
Record Mirror	4/5 stars

The Nat King Cole Songbook is a 1965 studio album by Sammy Davis Jr., recorded in tribute to singer and pianist Nat King Cole, who had recently died.

== Track listing ==
1. "Rambling Rose" (Joe Sherman, Noel Sherman) – 2:27
2. "Unforgettable" (Irving Gordon) – 2:32
3. "Straighten Up and Fly Right" (Nat King Cole, Irving Mills) – 2:45
4. "Pretend" (Lew Douglas, Frank LaVere, Cliff Parman) – 3:10
5. "Ballerina" (Bob Russell, Carl Sigman) – 2:21
6. "It's Only a Paper Moon" (Harold Arlen, Yip Harburg, Billy Rose) – 2:19
7. "Smile" (Charlie Chaplin, Geoff Parsons, John Turner) – 2:40
8. "Walkin' My Baby Back Home" (Fred E. Ahlert, Roy Turk) – 2:37
9. "Route 66" (Bobby Troup) – 2:43
10. "For Sentimental Reasons" (William Best, Deek Watson) – 2:12
11. "Send for Me" (Ollie Jones) – 2:25
12. "Sweet Lorraine" (Cliff Burwell, Mitchell Parish) – 2:57
13. "The Christmas Song" (Mel Tormé, Bob Wells) – 3:25
14. "Mona Lisa"/"Too Young"/"Nature Boy" (Ray Evans, Jay Livingston)/(Sylvia Dee, Sid Lippman)/(eden ahbez) – 5:02

== Personnel ==
- Sammy Davis Jr. - vocals
- Billy May - arranger tracks 1, 4, 8, 11
- Claus Ogerman - arranger tracks 2, 5, 10, 14
- Johnny Keating - arranger track 7
- Marty Paich - arranger track 13
