= If I Ruled the World (album) =

Studio album by Sammy Davis Jr.
- Released: 1965
- Recorded: 1965
- Genre: Vocal jazz
- Length: 31:26
- Label: Reprise

Sammy Davis Jr. chronology
The Shelter of Your Arms (1964)	If I Ruled the World (1965)	The Nat King Cole Songbook (1965)

Professional ratings
Review scores
Source	Rating
Allmusic	3.5/5 stars

If I Ruled the World is a 1965 studio album by Sammy Davis Jr. The album was produced by Warner Brothers.

== Track listing ==
1. "If I Ruled the World" (Leslie Bricusse, Cyril Ornadel) – 2:36
2. "Flash, Bang, Wallop!" (David Heneker) – 2:43
3. "Night Song" (Lee Adams, Charles Strouse) – 2:41
4. "Ten Out of Ten" (Bricusse) – 3:02
5. "Who Can I Turn To (When Nobody Needs Me)" (Bricusse, Anthony Newley) – 3:01
6. "There's a Party Going On" (Adams, Strouse) – 3:17
7. "Sit Down, You're Rockin' the Boat" (Frank Loesser) – 3:33
8. "Tracey" (Jule Styne) – 3:23
9. "Guys and Dolls" (Loesser) – 2:12
10. "Another Spring" (Robin Beaumont, Bricusse) – 2:41
11. "Yes I Can" (Adams, Strouse) – 2:15

== Personnel ==
- Sammy Davis Jr. – vocals
- Warren Barker – arrangement, conductor
- Morris Stoloff
- Marty Paich
- Morty Stevens
