= Napoleon XIV =

American singer (1938–2023)

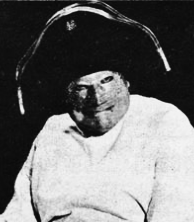
- Samuels in 1966

Background information
- Also known as: Jerry Samuels
- Born: Jerrold Laurence Samuels; May 3, 1938; New York City, U.S.
- Died: March 10, 2023 (aged 84) Phoenixville, Pennsylvania, U.S.
- Genres: Comedy, novelty
- Occupations: Singer; songwriter; producer; agent
- Instrument: Vocals
- Years active: 1956–2021
- Labels: Warner Bros., Needlejuice

Jerrold "Jerry" Laurence Samuels (May 3, 1938 – March 10, 2023) was an American singer, songwriter, record producer, and talent agent. Under the pseudonym Napoleon XIV, he achieved one-hit wonder status with the #3 hit novelty song "They're Coming to Take Me Away, Ha-Haaa!" in 1966. Samuels occasionally revisited the Napoleon XIV character to record other songs, usually comedy records with an insanity theme.

Under the name Scott David (his son's name), he cowrote "As If I Didn't Know" with Larry Kusik, a top-10 hit for Adam Wade in 1961. Samuels also wrote "The Shelter of Your Arms", a top-20 hit for Sammy Davis Jr. in 1964.

== Biography ==
=== Childhood and early career ===
Jerrold Laurence Samuels was born in Manhattan and was raised in the Bronx. He played the piano and wrote music throughout his childhood, and began his recording career in 1956 when he cut the single "Puppy Love" for the Vik Records subsidiary of RCA Victor Records.

Samuels was an acclaimed songwriter during the early 1960s. Under the name Scott David (his son's name), he cowrote "As If I Didn't Know" with Larry Kusik, a top-10 hit for Adam Wade in 1961. Samuels also wrote "The Shelter of Your Arms", a top-20 hit for Sammy Davis Jr. in 1964.

=== Napoleon XIV ===
In 1966, Samuels concocted "They're Coming to Take Me Away, Ha-Haaa!" while working at Associated Recording Studios in New York. The public found out his true identity when Cousin Brucie of WABC revealed his name. The record quickly climbed the charts, reaching the top ten nationally in just its third week on the Billboard Hot 100. It peaked at #3 and sold over one million copies, and was awarded a gold disc. In the Cash Box Top 100 the record climbed to #1 for one week, in its second week on the charts.

The success of the single inspired a Warner Bros. album of the same name in 1966 (reissued by Rhino in 1985), most of which continued the mental illness theme (for example: "Bats in My Belfry" and "I Live in a Split Level Head", the latter of which features different vocal parts in each stereo speaker). A second single of two recordings from that album went relatively unnoticed.

Samuels' manager was Leonard Stogel. His songs were often played on Dr. Demento's radio show.

=== Later career ===
In his later years, Samuels worked as a singer and agent who booked various performers in the Philadelphia metropolitan area. In 1984, he founded the Jerry Samuels Agency, and later operated it with his second wife, Bobbie Simon. They retired in 2021.

In February 2022, Needlejuice Records teased the release of "an album that's 50 years old". The following year, they confirmed that it was Samuels' long-lost second studio album, For God's Sake, Stop the Feces! The first disc of the album, recorded between April 1968 and December 1970, was rejected by Warner Bros. for its subject matter. Particularly controversial were tracks like "Rape", the lyrics to which are a graphic description of a sexual assault, and "The Note", a portrayal of a man writing a suicide note. The second disc is a collection of previously unreleased demos recorded by Samuels after 1970. These include "In the Shelter of Your Arms", which had been a top-20 hit for Sammy Davis Jr. in 1964, and "Bobbie's Song", a tribute to Samuels' second wife. For God's Sake, Stop the Feces! was released on April 20, 2023, one month after Samuels' death and nearly 57 years after They're Coming to Take Me Away, Ha-Haaa!, marking the second-longest gap between studio albums in history.

=== Personal life and death ===
Samuels was married twice: first to Rosemary Djivre, divorcing in 1968, and then to Bobbie Simon from 1996 until his death. He was also in a relationship with Petra Vesters from 1973 to 1987. He had a son from his first marriage and another from his relationship with Vesters. Another son predeceased him. Samuels was a longtime resident of the Oxford Circle neighborhood of Philadelphia, though he moved to an assisted living facility in King of Prussia, Pennsylvania, after retiring.

Samuels died from complications of Parkinson's disease dementia at a hospital in Phoenixville, Pennsylvania, on March 10, 2023, at the age of 84.

== Discography ==
=== Studio albums ===
Title	Date	Label	Cat. No.	Note
They're Coming to Take Me Away, Ha-Haaa!	July 1966	Warner Bros.	1661	Rereleased in 2023 by Needlejuice
For God's Sake, Stop the Feces!	April 2023	Needlejuice	NJR-103	Unreleased album from 1968-1970

=== Compilation albums ===
Title	Date	Label	Cat. No.	Note
The Second Coming	1996	Rhino Records	R2 72402	Recorded between 1966 and 1995

=== Singles ===
Date	Released as	A-Side	B-Side	Label	Cat. No.	Album	Note
Mar 1956	Jerry Samuels	"The Chosen Few"	"Puppy Love"	Vik	4X-0197	Non-album Singles	
Mar 1959	Jerry Simms	"Dancing With A Memory"	"Dancing Partners"	RCA Victor	47-7483	Non-album Singles	
Oct 1961	Jerry Simms	"Good Luck Orville!"	"Treasure Supreme"	Dual	501	Non-album Singles	
Jul 1966	Napoleon XIV	"They're Coming to Take Me Away, Ha-Haaa!"	"!aaaH-aH ,yawA eM ekaT oT gnimoC er'yehT"	Warner Bros.	5831	They're Coming to Take Me Away, Ha-Haaa!	Reissued in Jul 1973
Sep 1966	Napoleon XIV	"I'm in Love with My Little Red Tricycle"	"Doin' The Napoleon"	Warner Bros.	5853	They're Coming to Take Me Away, Ha-Haaa!	
1974	Jerry Samuels	"Can You Dig It"	"This Is Planet Earth"	Silver Blue	SB 813	Non-album Singles	
Nov 1975	Jerry Samuels	"I Owe A Lot To Iowa Pot"	"Who Are You To Tell Me Not To Smoke Marijuana"	J.E.P.	IP 1175	Non-album Singles	
1976	Napoleon XIV	"They're Coming to Take Me Away, Ha-Haaa!"	"Photogenic, Schizophrenic You"	Eric Records	195	Non-album Singles	
1990	Napoleon XIV	"They're Coming to Take Me Away, Ha-Haa!"	"They're Coming to Get Me Again, Ha-Haaa!"	Collectables	COL. 3859	Non-album Singles	A-side recorded 1966; B-side recorded 1988

=== Digital singles ===
- "Baby Talk at the Sleepover" (feat. Artie Barnes) (2022)
