= Sammy Davis Jr. Sings Mel Tormé's "California Suite" =

Studio album by Sammy Davis, Jr.
- Released: August 1964
- Recorded: 1964
- Genre: Jazz
- Length: 42:42
- Label: Reprise
- Producer: Gordon Anderson

Sammy Davis, Jr. chronology
The Shelter of Your Arms (1964)	Sammy Davis Jr. Sings Mel Tormé's "California Suite" (1964)	Sammy Davis Jr. Sings the Big Ones for Young Lovers (1964)

Sammy Davis Jr. Sings Mel Tormé's "California Suite" is a 1964 album by Sammy Davis Jr. The album received a highly positive critical reception.

== Critical reception ==
Professional ratings
Review scores
Source	Rating
Allmusic	4.5/5 stars

Cashbox in its "Pop Picks" reviews stated that "The teaming is top-notch here with Davis vocals, Torme tunes, and Mart Paich arrangements," adding that "Torme's lengthy 'California Suite' is given a potent airing by the dynamic voiced chanter along with bright readings of 'Stranger in Town,' 'Welcome To The Club,' and the unforgettable 'Christmas Song.'" They concluded that it was a "superior effort that merits the attention of Davis-Torme fans everywhere." Retrospectively, Lindsay Planer on AllMusic said that the "Tormé-penned ballads are perfectly suited to Paich's refined scores," believing "His hearty and cordial interpretations rival the work of Davis' rat-pack contemporaries Frank Sinatra and Dean Martin, especially the soulful down-and-out anthems 'A Stranger Called the Blues' and the commiserating 'Welcome to the Club.'"

== Track listing ==
All songs written by Mel Tormé and Robert Wells, except "California Suite" and "A Stranger in Town" (Tormé).

1. "California Suite" – 24:20
2. "A Stranger in Town" – 3:48
3. "A Stranger Called the Blues" – 4:04
4. "Welcome to the Club" – 3:26
5. "Willow Road" – 3:48
6. "Born to Be Blue" – 3:18
7. "The Christmas Song" – 3:21

== Personnel ==
- Sammy Davis Jr. – vocals
- Marty Paich – arranger, conductor
