= When the Feeling Hits You! =

Studio album by Sammy Davis Jr.
- Released: 1965
- Recorded: 1965
- Genre: Vocal jazz
- Length: 29:32
- Label: Reprise

Sammy Davis Jr. chronology
The Shelter of Your Arms (1964)	When the Feeling Hits You! (1965)	The Nat King Cole Songbook (1965)

Professional ratings
Review scores
Source	Rating
AllMusic	4/5 stars

When the Feeling Hits You! is a 1965 studio album by Sammy Davis Jr., featuring Sam Butera and the Witnesses.

== Background ==
The album was released on the Reprise label, catalogue number RS 6144.

== Track listing ==
1. "When the Feeling Hits You" (Doyle) – 2:57
2. "Don't Cry, Joe (Let Her Go, Let Her Go, Let Her Go)" (Joe Marsala) – 2:51
3. "There Will Never Be Another You" (Mack Gordon, Harry Warren) – 2:08
4. "April in Paris" (Vernon Duke, Yip Harburg) – 2:47
5. "L' Amour, Toujours l'Amour" (Roger Casini, Rudolf Friml, Chisholm Cushing) – 1:57
6. "I Should Care" (Sammy Cahn, Axel Stordahl, Paul Weston) – 2:57
7. "Cry Me a River" (Arthur Hamilton) – 3:13
8. "Do Nothing till You Hear from Me" (Duke Ellington, Bob Russell) – 3:01
9. "These Foolish Things (Remind Me of You)" (Harry Link, Holt Marvell, Jack Strachey) – 3:59
10. "This Is Always" (Gordon, Warren) – 3:42

== Personnel ==
- Sammy Davis Jr. - vocals
- Sam Butera and the Witnesses:
  Sam Butera - Tenor sax/arranger
  Lou Scioneaux - Trombone
  Morgan Thomas - Trumpet
  Bobby Rosario - Piano
  Rolando "Rolly Dee" DiIorio - Bass
  Jimmy Vincent - Drums
