= I Gotta Right to Swing =

Studio album by Sammy Davis Jr.
- Released: 1960
- Recorded: August 15, 1955
- Genre: Vocal jazz; R&B; swing
- Length: 37:02
- Label: Decca DL 78981

Sammy Davis Jr. chronology
Sammy Awards (1960)	I Gotta Right to Swing (1960)	The Wham of Sam (1961)

I Gotta Right to Swing is a 1960 studio album by Sammy Davis Jr., accompanied by an uncredited Count Basie Orchestra, minus Count Basie himself.

== Reception ==
Professional ratings
Review scores
Source	Rating
Allmusic	4/5 stars

The Allmusic review by Nick Dedina awarded the album four stars and said that the album "is an invigorating mix of up-tempo swing and hard-hitting rhythm & blues...a must-have for fans of classic pop and vocal jazz". It was the last album Sammy Davis, Jr recorded for Decca Records.

== Track listing ==
1. "The Lady Is a Tramp" (Richard Rodgers, Lorenz Hart) - 4:23
2. "I Gotta Right to Sing the Blues" (Harold Arlen, Ted Koehler) - 3:04
3. "Get On the Right Track Baby" (Titus Turner, Ray Charles) - 2:46
4. "Do Nothin' Till You Hear From Me" (Duke Ellington, Bob Russell) - 3:19
5. "I Got a Woman" (Charles, Renald Richard) - 4:30
6. "There Is No Greater Love" (Isham Jones, Marty Symes) - 2:37
7. "Gee, Baby, Ain't I Good to You" (Andy Razaf, Don Redman) - 3:51
8. "This Little Girl of Mine" (Charles) - 2:01
9. "Till Then" (Eddie Seiler, Sol Marcus, Guy Wood) - 3:23
10. "Face to Face" (Bob Ralske, Ben Weisman) - 3:06
11. "Mess Around" (Ahmet Ertegün) - 2:49

== Personnel ==
- Sammy Davis Jr. - vocals
- George Rhodes - piano
- Sy Oliver, Jack Pleis, Morty Stevens - arranger, conductor
- The Count Basie Orchestra:
  - John Anderson, Ernie Royal, Snooky Young, Thad Jones, Joe Newman - trumpet
  - Benny Powell, Al Grey, Henry Coker, Henderson Chambers - trombone
  - Marshall Royal, Frank Wess, Eric Dolphy - alto saxophone
  - Frank Foster, Billy Mitchell - tenor saxophone
  - Charlie Fowlkes - baritone saxophone
  - Freddie Green - guitar
  - Ed Jones - double bass
  - Sonny Payne - drums
- Personnel as listed in the liner notes.
