= Don't Cry, Joe (Let Her Go, Let Her Go, Let Her Go) =

1949 song

"Don't Cry, Joe (Let Her Go, Let Her Go, Let Her Go)" is a popular song written by Joe Marsala, and recorded by Johnny Desmond on May 21, 1949.

== Frank Sinatra recording ==
The recording was released by MGM (catalog number 10518) and reached #22 on the Billboard chart. Frank Sinatra recorded an effective version that reached #6 the same year. The Sinatra version can be found on various Columbia re-issues of his work. He later re-recorded the song in 1961 for his Sinatra Swings album.

== Other recordings ==
- Also in 1949, Juanita Hall recorded the song which peaked at #22.
- Sammy Davis Jr. recorded the song for this album When the Feeling Hits You! (1965).
