= Circle 2: Gathering =

Studio album by Circle
- Released: 1971
- Recorded: May 17, 1971
- Studio: Upsurge Studio, New York City
- Genre: Free jazz
- Label: CBS/Sony Japan; SOPL-20-XJ
- Producer: Kiyoshi Itoh

Circle chronology
Circle 1: Live in Germany Concert (1971)	Circle 2: Gathering (1971)	Paris Concert (1972)

Circle 2: Gathering is an album by Circle, a free jazz quartet that featured multi-instrumentalist Anthony Braxton, pianist Chick Corea, double bassist Dave Holland, and drummer Barry Altschul. The group's final studio session prior to their break-up, it was recorded on May 17, 1971, at Upsurge Studio in New York City, and was released on vinyl later that year by CBS/Sony Japan. Along with Circle 1: Live in Germany Concert, the album was reissued on CD by Corea's Stretch label during the 1990s.

== Reception ==
Professional ratings
Review scores
Source	Rating
Pitchfork	7.7/10 stars

Pitchfork's Seth Colter Walls wrote: "the openness of the performance—and its simultaneous balance—is an achievement that only a well-drilled group can deliver. The poetic understanding between Braxton and Holland is announced early on when the string player (on cello) offers gorgeous bowed lines behind the soprano saxophonist's soulful phrases. Corea's opening melodic material is similarly attractive, and he provides well-timed transitions and smart support to other band members throughout."

Regarding the CD reissue, Joseph Neff of The Vinyl District noted that the availability of the album "substantially improves our current musical situation," in that it helps to "capture pianist Chick Corea's too brief immersion into the avant-garde."

Dave Connolly of Progrography called the music "a dialogue" that is "done with a communal spirit that transcends the usual limitations of spontaneous composition." He commented: "There is a palpable connection between the players... The conversation centers largely around the subject of what constitutes music. Saxophones yield to slide whistles, strings are plucked and pulled and scratched, anything within reach is struck, yet it's all done in sympathy to what's happening around it."

== Track listing ==
Track timings not provided.

1. "Gathering - Part I" (Chick Corea)
2. "Gathering - Part II" (Chick Corea)

== Personnel ==
- Anthony Braxton – reeds, percussion
- Chick Corea – piano, bamboo flute, percussion
- Dave Holland – double bass, cello, guitar, percussion
- Barry Altschul – drums, finger piano, percussion
