= Lou Sino =

American musical artist (1930–1986)

- Born: Louis Marcel Scioneaux; August 16, 1930; Algiers, Louisiana, United States
- Died: July 30, 1986 (aged 55)
- Genres: Jazz, blues
- Occupation: Musician
- Instruments: Trombone, guitar
- Years active: 1940s–1986
- Labels: L.S.I, Bengal Records, Capitol

Lou Sino (August 16, 1930 – July 30, 1986) was a New Orleans trombonist and singer who came to prominence as a member of Louis Prima's backing band The Witnesses, led by Sam Butera. He also released a number of his own recordings with his band The Bengals.

== Background ==
Louis Marcel Scioneaux was born to parents Eyere and Florence Scioneaux in Algiers, Louisiana, on August 16, 1930. He was the second born of six children. He went to Behrman High School and played in the high school band there. From the age of 13, he had been playing trombone and guitar.

He was married to wife Patricia for 33 years and with her he raised five children.

== Career ==
=== 1940s to 1967 ===
By the age of 17, he was playing at the Famous Door. In 1956, Sino was in New Orleans, playing with musicians such as Dick Allen, trumpeter Stuart Bergen, banjo player, Tom Brown, and tenor saxophonist Francis A. Murray.

In 1957, he joined Louis Prima's group. To make Lou's surname easier to pronounce, Prima shortened the name from Scioneaux to Sino. While a member of Prima's band, he was described as the rubber-faced trombonist, and in a Billboard article as looking like an ultra-conservative bank clerk.

Sino was also a member of The Witnesses that backed In a review of the Big Horn album by Sam Butera & The Witnesses that appeared in the October 20, 1958, edition of Billboard, Sino's trombone playing was noted on the tracks, "La Vie En Rose", "Hey There", and "Three Coins In The Fountain"

In 1959, according to Down Beat magazine, the line-up of Prima's band was Sino (referred to there as Scioneaux) on trombone, Bobby Roberts on guitar, John Nagy on piano, Rolly De Orio on bass, and Paul Ferrara on drums. He stayed with Prima's group until 1967 which marked ten years with them.

In 1967, Sino was again a member of The Witnesses, in a line up that included Sam Butera on vocals and tenor sax, Bobby Setzler on guitar, John Nagy on piano, Jimmy Vincent on drums, Rolly Dee on vocal and string bass, and Morgan Thomas on alto sax, valve trombone and flute.

=== 1968 onwards ===
By 1970, Sino was fronting his group, Lou Sino and the Bengals. Their signature song was "Tiger Rag". In November 1970, along with the Ronnioe Cole Trio, Maxine Sullivan and Eubie Blake, Sino and his group, Lou Sino and the Bengals played at a concert in honor of W.C. Handy in Muscle Shoals. Sino and his band the Bengals were a popular host band in New Orleans. They played the Crossroads Convention in 1976.

Sino's last years were spent playing with the Bengals, playing in the French Quarter of New Orleans. he played at venues such as the playing at the Mason Bourbon and at the Economy Hall in the Royal Sonesta Hotel up until 1986 which is when he died.

== Recordings ==
=== Solo and as bandleader ===
Albums

- Lou Sino - Now - Bengal Records LS-110973 - 1973
- Lou Sino - a Jazzman Comes Home - L.S.I. LPS-145
- Lou Sino And The Bengals - Hold That Tiger - Maison Bourbon Records – MB-11
- Lou Sino with Rene Netto and the Bengals - Give Me that Old and New Time Religion - Harvey, LA : L.S.I. - (unknown year)

Singles

- Lou Sino - "She's Got To Be A Saint" / "Tie A Yellow Ribbon Around The Ole Oak Tree" - Bengal 112873

=== In groups ===
- Sam Butera & The Witnesses - The Big Horn - Capitol T 1098 - 1958
- Louis Prima and Keely Smith with Sam Butera and the Witnesses - Capitol Records – T1010 - 1958
- Sam Butera And The Witnesses - Louis Prima Presents The Wildest Clan - Dot Records DLP 3272 - 1960
- Louis Prima with Gia Maione and Sam Butera and the Witnesses – The King Of Clubs - Prima Magnagroove PS 3003
- Louis Prima with Sam Butera and the Witnesses - Strictly Prima! - Capitol Records – 1566231 - 1985
- Louis Prima - Capitol Collectors Series - Capitol Records – CDP 7 94072 2 - (CD)
- Louis Prima & Keely Smith with Sam Butera and the Witnesses - Jasmine Records JASCD 331 - 1994 (CD)

=== Backing ===
- Sammy Davis Jr. Meets Sam Butera & The Witnesses - When the Feeling Hits You! - Reprise RS 6144 - 1965 (as a member of The Witnesses)

=== Presenting ===
- Rene Netto - Lou Sino Presents The Sounds of Rene Netto - L.S.I LPS-144

(Note: some versions of the album have L.S.I. Presents the Sounds of Rene Netto)
