= John Turner (lyricist) =

English lyricist (1902–1982)

- Born: James John Turner Phillips; 7 July 1902; Islington, London, England
- Died: 14 April 1982 (aged 79) Brighton, East Sussex, England
- Occupations: Lyricist; Company manager

James John Turner Phillips, also known as Jimmy Phillips, (7 July 1902 – 14 April 1982) was an English lyricist who used the pen name John Turner.

== Biography ==
He ran the Peter Maurice Music Company, whose most important lyricist was Geoffrey Parsons. The company specialized in adapting songs originally in foreign languages into the English language. He would usually assign a song to Parsons and when the latter was finished, suggest some changes. The credits for the English lyrics would then be given as "John Turner and Geoffrey Parsons".

The words of "Smile" to the music of Charlie Chaplin, was written at the Peter Maurice Music Company office on Denmark Street, London in 1954.

== Lyrics credited to Turner and Parsons ==
- "Auf Wiederseh'n Sweetheart"
- "Mama"
- "Oh! My Pa-Pa" based on the German song "O Mein Papa" by Paul Burkhard
- "Smile"

== Lyrics credited to Turner, Parsons, and another collaborator ==
- "The Little Shoemaker," based on the French song "Le petit cordonnier", with Nathan Korb.
