= Our Shining Hour =

1965 album by Sammy Davis Jr. with Count Basie

Studio album by Sammy Davis Jr.
- Released: 1965
- Recorded: September 2–5, 1964, New York City
- Genre: Vocal jazz
- Length: 35:49
- Label: Verve
- Producer: Jim Davis

Sammy Davis Jr. chronology
The Nat King Cole Songbook (1964)	Our Shining Hour (1965)	Sammy's Back on Broadway (1965)

Count Basie chronology
It Might as Well Be Swing (1964)	Our Shining Hour (1964)	Pop Goes the Basie (1965)

Professional ratings
Review scores
Source	Rating
AllMusic	4.5/5 stars

Our Shining Hour is a 1965 studio album by Sammy Davis Jr., accompanied by the Count Basie Orchestra, arranged by Quincy Jones.

In 1973, MGM Records released Sammy Davis Jr. and Count Basie with an identical track listing created using alternate takes from the Our Shining Hour recording sessions in 1964 with newly recorded vocals.

== Chart performance ==
The album debuted on Billboard magazine's Top LP's chart in the issue dated March 27, 1965, peaking at No. 141 during a four-week run on the chart.

== Track listing ==
1. "My Shining Hour" (Harold Arlen, Johnny Mercer) – 2:10
2. "Teach Me Tonight" (Sammy Cahn, Gene de Paul) – 3:05
3. "Work Song" (Nat Adderley, Oscar Brown Jr.) – 2:12
4. "Why Try to Change Me Now?" (Cy Coleman, Joseph Allan McCarthy) – 3:24
5. "Blues for Mr. Charlie" (Bobby Sharp) – 3:43
6. "April in Paris" (Vernon Duke, Yip Harburg) – 2:45
7. "New York City Blues" (Quincy Jones, Peggy Lee) – 2:51
8. "You're Nobody till Somebody Loves You" (James Cavanaugh, Russ Morgan, Larry Stock) – 2:58
9. "She's a Woman (W-O-M-A-N)" (Jerry Leiber and Mike Stoller) – 2:21
10. "The Girl from Ipanema" (Vinícius de Moraes, Antonio Carlos Jobim, Norman Gimbel) – 4:07
11. "Keepin' Out of Mischief Now" (Andy Razaf, Fats Waller) – 2:51
12. "Bill Basie Won't You Please Come Home" (Count Basie, Sammy Davis, Jr., Jones) – 2:38

== Personnel ==
- Sammy Davis Jr. - vocals, tap

The Count Basie Orchestra

- Count Basie - piano, bandleader
- Quincy Jones - arranger, conductor
- George Rhodes - arranger
- Al Aarons - trumpet
- Sonny Cohn
- Wallace Davenport
- Joe Newman
- Snooky Young
- Henderson Chambers - trombone
- Henry Coker
- Bill Hughes
- Grover Mitchell
- Marshal Royal - clarinet, alto saxophone
- Eric Dixon - tenor saxophone
- Sal Nistico
- Charles Fowlkes - baritone saxophone
- Frank Wess - saxophone
- Freddie Green - guitar
- Ray Brown - double bass
- Sonny Payne - drums
- Emil Richards - percussion
