= Sammy's Back on Broadway =

Studio album by Sammy Davis Jr.
- Released: August 1965
- Recorded: April 1965
- Genre: Vocal jazz
- Length: 33:44
- Label: Reprise
- Producer: Sonny Burke

Sammy Davis Jr. chronology
Our Shining Hour (1965)	Sammy's Back on Broadway (1965)	The Sammy Davis Jr. Show (1966)

Professional ratings
Review scores
Source	Rating
Allmusic	4/5 stars

Sammy's Back on Broadway is a 1965 studio album by Sammy Davis Jr.

== Chart performance ==
The album debuted on Billboard magazine's Top LP's chart in the issue dated September 4, 1965, peaking at No. 104 during a four-week run on the chart.

== Track listing ==
1. "A Wonderful Day Like Today" (Leslie Bricusse, Anthony Newley) – 2:27
2. "Take the Moment" (Richard Rodgers, Stephen Sondheim) – 2:43
3. "The Joker" (Bricusse, Newley) – 2:11
4. "I Want to Be With You" (Lee Adams, Charles Strouse) – 3:08
5. "Sunrise, Sunset" (Jerry Bock, Sheldon Harnick) – 3:51
6. "Look at That Face" (Bricusse, Newley) – 2:25
7. "Do I Hear a Waltz?" (Rodgers, Sondheim) – 2:47
8. "A Room Without Windows" (Ervin Drake) – 3:16
9. "A Married Man" (Marian Grudeff, Ray Jessel) – 2:25
10. "The Other Half of Me" (Stan Freeman, Jack Lawrence) – 2:56
11. "People" (Bob Merrill, Jule Styne) – 2:58
12. "Hello, Dolly!" (Jerry Herman) – 2:34

== Personnel ==
- Sammy Davis Jr. - vocals
- Claus Ogerman - arranger, conductor
