= The Sammy Davis Jr. Show (album) =

Studio album by Sammy Davis Jr.
- Released: February 1966
- Recorded: 1961–1966
- Genre: Vocal jazz
- Length: 33:55
- Label: Reprise

Sammy Davis Jr. chronology
Sammy's Back on Broadway (1965)	The Sammy Davis Jr. Show (1966)	The Sounds of '66 (1966)

The Sammy Davis Jr. Show is a 1966 studio album by Sammy Davis Jr., released to coincide with his television show of the same name.

The album is collated from five studio sessions from 1961 to 1966. "We Open in Venice" had previously appeared on Reprise Musical Repertory Theatre (1963).

== Reception ==
Professional ratings
Review scores
Source	Rating
AllMusic	4/5 stars
Record Mirror	3/5 stars

The AllMusic review by Lindsay Planer awarded the album four stars, and said that the album "emphasizes Davis' innate affinity and apt interpretations of show tunes from the small screen".

== Track listing ==
1. "Hey There" (Richard Adler, Jerry Ross) - 2:56
2. "My Mother the Car" (Paul Hampton) - 2:03
3. "We Open in Venice" (Cole Porter) - 2:14 (with Frank Sinatra and Dean Martin)
4. "More Than One Way" (Sammy Cahn, Jimmy Van Heusen) - 3:14
5. "Feeling Good" (Leslie Bricusse, Anthony Newley) - 3:03
6. "Paris Is at Her Best in May" (Charles Aznavour, Gene Lees, Pierre Roche) - 2:56
7. "Love at Last You Have Found Me" (Aznavour, Johnny Worth) - 2:59
8. "Sam's Song" (Jack Elliott, Lew Quadling) - 2:45 (with Dean Martin)
9. "If You Want This Love of Mine" (Sonny Knight) - 2:41
10. "No One Can Live Forever" (Charles Tobias) - 2:39
11. "This Dream" (Bricusse, Newley) - 2:56
12. "What Kind of Fool Am I" (Bricusse, Newley) - 3:22

== Personnel ==
- Sammy Davis Jr. – vocals
- Frank Sinatra
- Dean Martin
