= Kevin Clark (poet) =

American poet

Kevin Clark (born 1950) is an American poet and critic, author of the poetry collections In the Evening of No Warning and Self-Portrait with Expletives.

== Early life ==
Kevin was born in New York City and grew up in Northern, NJ and now lives in San Luis Obispo, California, with his wife, Amy Hewes. He holds a PhD in English and an MA in Creative Writing, both from the University of California, Davis, and a BA in English from the University of Florida. He teaches Creative Writing and Literature at Cal Poly in San Luis Obispo and at the Rainier Writing Workshop Low Residency MFA Program in Tacoma, Washington.

The author of two full-length poetry collections, three chapbooks, and a textbook on poetry writing, Clark has published poetry and nonfiction in numerous periodicals, including The Southern Review, Antioch Review, Crazyhorse, Denver Quarterly, The Georgia Review, Gulf Coast, Iowa Review, and Ploughshares.

== Awards ==
- Lena-Miles Wever Todd Poetry Book Prize from Pleiades Press, for Self-Portrait with Expletives (judge: Martha Collins)
- Angoff Award from The Literary Review

== Published works ==
- Self-Portrait with Expletives (Pleiades Press/LSU Press, 2010; ISBN 978-0-8071-3645-4)
- In the Evening of No Warning (New Issues Poetry & Prose, 2002; ISBN 978-1-930974-13-5)
- One of Us (Mille Grazie Press, 2000; chapbook)
- Widow under New Moon (Owl Creek Press, 1990; chapbook)
- Granting the Wolf (State Street Press, 1984; chapbook)
- The Mind's Eye: A Guide to Writing Poetry (Longman, 2007; ISBN 978-0-205-49823-9)
