= Geoffrey Parsons (lyricist) =

English lyricist (1910–1987)

- Born: Geoffrey Claremont Parsons; England
- Died: December 22, 1987 (aged 77) Eastbourne, East Sussex, England
- Occupation: lyricist
- Works: lyrics for "Smile"

Geoffrey Claremont Parsons (7 January 1910 – 22 December 1987) was an English lyricist. Best known for writing the lyrics in 1954 for the song "Smile",

== Life ==
Parsons worked at the Peter Maurice Music Company run by James Phillips, who wrote under the pen name John Turner.

The company specialized in adapting songs originally in foreign languages into the English language. Phillips would usually assign a song to Parsons and, when the latter was finished, suggest some changes. The credits for the English lyrics would then be given as "John Turner and Geoffrey Parsons."

1954, Parsons penned what would become his most famous lyrics. Working for his boss, he wrote the poignant lyrics to a song Charlie Chaplin had composed for an earlier film, Modern Times. When the movie was released in 1936, the music quickly become associated with Chaplin and his films. Parsons wrote the lyrics to "Smile". After a few tweaks by the boss, the song was then published as "Smile", Music by Charlie Chaplin and Lyrics by John Turner and Geoffrey Parsons.

Nat King Cole recorded the first version with lyrics. It charted in 1954, reaching number 10 on the Billboard charts and number 2 in October on the UK Singles Chart.

== Personal life ==
Parsons died in Eastbourne in 1987.

== Songs ==
- "Auf Wiederseh'n Sweetheart" (with Turner)
- "Eternally", with John Turner; music by Charles Chaplin (Theme from Limelight)
- "If You Love Me (Really Love Me)" ("Hymne à l'amour," original lyrics by Édith Piaf)
- "The Little Shoemaker" based on the French song "Le petit cordonnier", with Turner and Nathan Korb.
- "Mama" (with Turner)
- "Oh! My Pa-Pa" based on the German song "O Mein Papa" by Paul Burkhard, under the pseudonym "John Sexton" (with Turner)
- "La Seine"
- "Smile" (with Turner)
