= Paris-Concert (Circle album) =

Live album by Circle
- Released: May 2, 1972
- Recorded: February 21, 1971
- Venue: ORTF; Paris, France
- Genre: Avant-garde jazz
- Length: 94:56
- Label: ECM 1018/19 ST
- Producer: Manfred Eicher

Circle chronology
Circle 2: Gathering (1971)	Paris-Concert (1972)	Circling In (1975)

Chick Corea chronology
Sundance (1972)	Paris Concert (1972)	Piano Improvisations Vol. 2 (1972)

Paris-Concert is a live double album by the short-lived jazz band Circle, recorded at the Maison de l'O.R.T.F. in Paris on February 21, 1971, and released on ECM Records the following year. The quartet consists of reed player Anthony Braxton and rhythm section Chick Corea, David Holland and Barry Altschul.

== Reception ==
The AllMusic review by Scott Yanow stated: "The music is often quite abstract but generally colorful and innovative; Chick Corea would soon break up the band for other musical adventures, but this set remains one of the high points of his productive career."

Professional ratings
Review scores
Source	Rating
AllMusic	4.5/5 stars
The Penguin Guide to Jazz Recordings	3/4 stars
The Rolling Stone Jazz Record Guide	3/5 stars

== Track listing ==
Side I
No.	Title	Writer(s)	Length
1.	"Nefertiti"	Wayne Shorter	19:14
2.	"Song for the Newborn"	Holland	6:57
Total length:			26:11

Side II
No.	Title	Writer(s)	Length
1.	"Duet"	Braxton; Corea	10:31
2.	"Lookout Farm / 73 Degrees Kelvin (Variation – 3)"	Altschul; Braxton	16:06
Total length:			26:37

Side III
No.	Title	Writer(s)	Length
1.	"Toy Room / Q & A"	Holland	24:41
Total length:			24:41

Side IV
No.	Title	Writer(s)	Length
1.	"No Greater Love"	Isham Jones; Marty Symes	17:37
Total length:			17:37

== Personnel ==
=== Circle ===
- Anthony Braxton – reeds, percussion
- Chick Corea – piano
- David Holland – double bass, cello
- Barry Altschul – drums, percussion
