= There Is No Greater Love =

1936 jazz standard composed by Isham Jones

Single by Isham Jones' Orchestra
- A-side: "Life Begins When You're In Love"
- Released: 1936
- Genre: Jazz standard ballad
- Length: 3:01
- Label: Decca
- Composer: Isham Jones
- Lyricist: Marty Symes

"There Is No Greater Love" is a 1936 jazz standard composed by Isham Jones, with lyrics by Marty Symes. It was the last hit song for Jones's orchestra before the bandleader turned the orchestra over to Woody Herman, beginning the latter's 50-year career as a bandleader.

The song is often played as a ballad – an example of this approach is Dinah Washington's 1954 recording on Dinah Jams. Medium-tempo swing renditions have also been recorded by several artists, including Miles Davis, Gene Ammons, and Sonny Stitt.

== Other versions ==
- Isham Jones with Woody Herman – 1936
- Duke Ellington – 1936
- Billie Holiday – 1947
- Patti Page - Patti Page Sings for Romance (1953).
- Dinah Washington – Dinah Jams (1954)
- Miles Davis – Miles (1955)
- Peggy Lee - The Man I Love (1957).
- Sonny Rollins – Way Out West (1957)
- Nat King Cole - The Very Thought of You (1958).
- Ahmad Jamal - At the Pershing: But Not For Me (1958)
- Sammy Davis Jr. - I Gotta Right to Swing (1960).
- Bobby Darin - Love Swings (1961).
- McCoy Tyner - Inception (1962)
- Miles Davis – Four & More (1964)
- Aretha Franklin - Yeah!!! (1965)
- Circle – Paris Concert (1971)
- Woody Shaw with Cedar Walton – Setting Standards (1983)
- Lenny Breau – Live at Bourbon St. (1983)
- Stan Getz and Kenny Barron – People Time (1991)
- Vincent Herring with Wallace Roney and Mulgrew Miller – Simple Pleasure (2001)
- Amy Winehouse – Frank (2003)
- James Simpson - Soul Revival (2003).

== See also ==
- List of 1930s jazz standards
