= Smile (Charlie Chaplin song) =

Composition by Charlie Chaplin

Song by Charlie Chaplin
- Written: 1936 (instrumental theme); 1954 (lyrics)
- Published: 1954 by Bourne
- Length: 2:52
- Composer: Charlie Chaplin
- Lyricists: John Turner; Geoffrey Parsons

Audio video
- "Smile" on YouTube

"Smile" is a song based on the theme song used in the soundtrack for Charlie Chaplin's 1936 film Modern Times.

== Background ==
Chaplin, who composed the song with the help of composer David Raksin, was inspired by a sequence in the first act love duet from Puccini's opera Tosca, beginning with Cavaradossi singing "Quale occhio al mondo può star di paro". John Turner and Geoffrey Parsons added the lyrics and title in 1954. In the lyrics, based on lines and themes from the film, the singer is telling the listener to cheer up and that there is always a bright tomorrow, just as long as they smile.

"Smile" has become a popular standard since its original use in Chaplin's film and has been recorded by numerous artists.

== Cover versions ==
=== Nat King Cole version ===
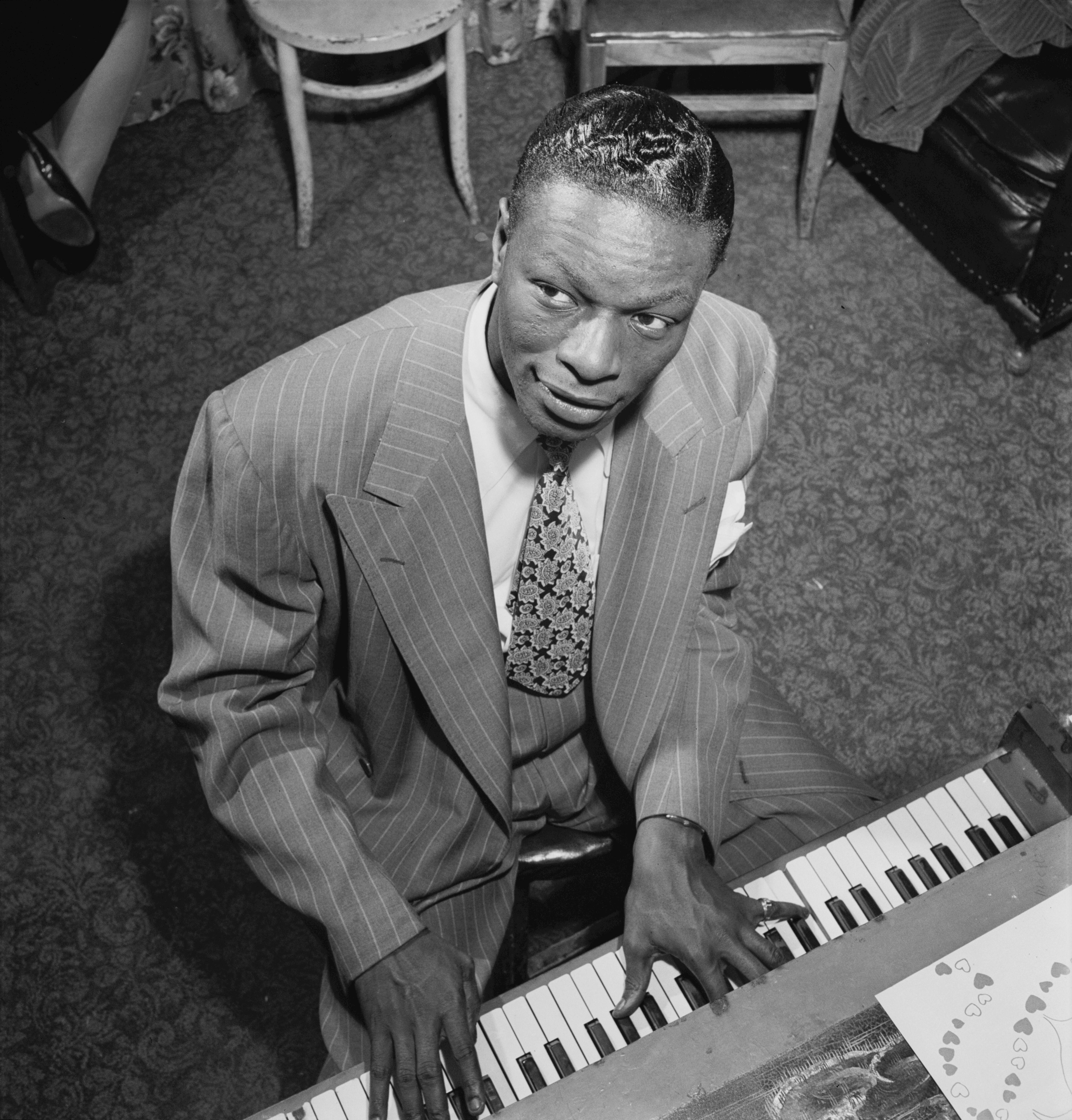
Nat King Cole circa 1947

Nat King Cole recorded the first version with lyrics. It charted in 1954, reaching number 10 on the Billboard charts and number 2 on the UK Singles Chart. This version was also used at the beginning of the 1975 movie Smile.

Sammy Davis Jr. recorded a cover version of the Cole original, as part of his tribute album The Nat King Cole Songbook in 1965.

==== Charts ====
Chart (1954)	Peak position
Belgium (Ultratop)	2
UK Singles (OCC)	2
US Billboard Hot 100	10

=== Michael Jackson version ===
"Smile"

Promotional single by Michael Jackson

from the album HIStory: Past, Present and Future, Book I
- B-side: "Is It Scary"; "Off the Wall" (Junior Vasquez remix)
- Released: December 28, 1997
- Recorded: March 11–12, 1995
- Studio: The Hit Factory (New York)
- Genre: Soul
- Length: 4:55 (album version); 4:10 (short version)
- Label: Epic
- Composer: Charlie Chaplin
- Lyricists: John Turner; Geoffrey Parsons
- Producers: David Foster; Michael Jackson

Licensed audio
- "Smile" on YouTube

American singer Michael Jackson recorded "Smile" for HIStory: Past, Present and Future, Book I (1995). It was scheduled to be released as the final single from the album in 1997, but was withdrawn before its intended commercial release and was only released promotionally in limited quantities. It is performed in the Michael Jackson: One Las Vegas production.

Entertainment Weekly called Jackson's version of the song a "destined-for-Disney rendition." James Hunter of Rolling Stone wrote a negative review: "the climactic version of Charlie Chaplin's "Smile" has zero point of view on itself; its blend of rampaging ego and static orchestral pop is a Streisand-size mistake."

Jackson considered the original "Smile" to be one of his favorite songs. In 2009 at Jackson's memorial service, his brother Jermaine Jackson sang a version of the song in Michael's honor.

==== Track listing ====
CD maxi single (withdrawn)

1. "Smile" (short version) – 4:10
2. "Is It Scary" (radio edit) – 4:11
3. "Is It Scary" (Eddie's Love Mix Edit) – 3:50
4. "Is It Scary" (Downtempo Groove Mix) – 4:50
5. "Is It Scary" (Deep Dish Dark and Scary Radio Edit) – 4:34

12" maxi single (withdrawn)

- A1. "Smile" – 4:55
- A2. "Is It Scary" (Deep Dish Dark and Scary Remix) – 12:07
- B1. "Is It Scary" (Eddie's Rub-a-Dub Mix) – 5:00
- B2. "Is It Scary" (Eddie's Love Mix) – 8:00
- B3. "Off the Wall" (Junior Vasquez Remix) – 4:57

==== Charts ====
Chart performance for "Smile" by Michael Jackson
Chart (2009)	Peak position
Germany (GfK)	71
Switzerland (Schweizer Hitparade)	70
UK Singles (Official Charts)	74
US Digital Song Sales (Billboard)	56

=== Other charting versions ===
- September 1954: Sunny Gale (with Hugo Winterhalter Orchestra) – RCA Victor 5836 (#19)
- October 1954: David Whitfield – Decca F.10355 (#25)
- In 1959, Tony Bennett recorded the song which in the US, peaked at #73 on the Hot 100.
- In 1961, Timi Yuro released a version that reached #42 on the Hot 100.
- In late 1964, Jerry Butler and Betty Everett recorded and charted with the song as a duet.
- Robert Downey Jr. recorded 2 versions of the song--one was included in the soundtrack of the movie Chaplin and released as a single in U.K. in 1992; the other was included in his album The Futurist. The U.K. version topped at #68.

=== Other notable recordings ===
- Westlife covered the song on their 2004 album ...Allow Us to Be Frank. The song was released as the first single from the record on 4 November 2004.
- Lady Gaga recorded a version of the song for Harlequin (2024), her companion album to the American musical thriller film Joker: Folie à Deux (2024).
