= Kevin Clarke (music historian) =

Irish-German author and scholar

Kevin Clarke

Kevin Clarke (born 14 February 1967) is an Irish-German music historian specializing in 1920s jazz operettas.

Born in Berlin, Germany, Clarke is the author of various books dealing with topics such as the jazz and revue operettas of the Weimar Republic, operetta in Nazi Germany, and homosexuality and operetta. Since 2006 he has been director of the Operetta Research Center Amsterdam (ORCA).

== Writings ==
- The Art of Looking: The Life and Treasures of Collector Charles Leslie (Bruno Gmuender, 2015).
- Die Welt der Operette. Glamour, Stars & Showbusiness (Wien: Brandstätter, 2011), ISBN 978-3-85033-581-2.
- "Im Himmel spielt auch schon die Jazzband". Emmerich Kálmán und die transatlantische Operette 1928–32 (Hamburg: von Bockel, 2007, ISBN 978-3-932696-70-1.
- Glitter and be Gay: Die authentische Operette und ihre schwulen Verehrer (Hamburg: Männerschwarm, 2007), ISBN 978-3-939542-13-1.
- Im Weißen Rössl – Auf den Spuren eines Welterfolg (St. Wolfgang: Rössl Hotel, 2007), ISBN 978-3-200-01030-7.
- Die Tagebücher des Dr. Ralph Benatzky. Zwischen Berlin und Hollywood: Eine Zeitreise in die 20er Jahre, audio book )Duo-phon Records), ISBN 978-3-937127-11-8.
- Holland in musicals en operettes, in: Actuele Onderwerpen, No. 2814 (2004).
