= Sam Butera =

American saxophonist (1927–2009)

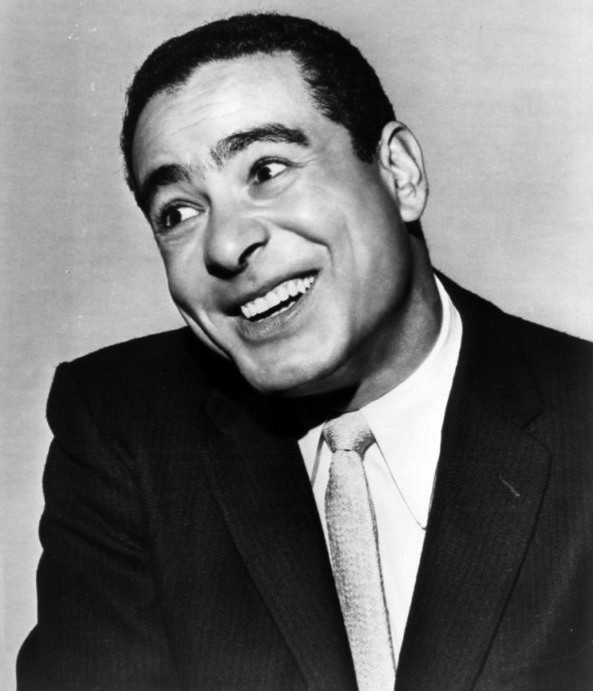
- Butera in 1961

Background information
- Born: August 17, 1927; New Orleans, Louisiana, U.S.
- Died: June 3, 2009 (aged 81) Las Vegas, Nevada, U.S.
- Genres: Jazz; pop; R&B
- Occupation: Musician
- Instrument: Tenor saxophone
- Years active: 1954-2000
- Formerly of: Louis Prima; Keely Smith; Lou Sino; The Witnesses

Sam Butera (August 17, 1927 – June 3, 2009) was an American tenor saxophonist and singer best noted for his collaborations with Louis Prima and Keely Smith. Butera is frequently regarded as a crossover artist who performed with equal ease in both R&B and the post-big band pop style of jazz that permeated the early Vegas nightclub scene.

== Biography ==
Butera was born and raised in an Italian-American family in New Orleans, where his father, Joe, ran a butcher shop and played guitar in his spare time. He heard the saxophone for the first time at a wedding when he was seven years old, and, with his father's encouragement, he began to play.

Butera's professional career blossomed early, beginning with a stint in big band drummer Ray McKinley's orchestra directly after high school. Butera was named one of America's top upcoming jazzmen by Look magazine when he was only eighteen years old, and, by his early twenties, he had landed positions in the orchestras of Tommy Dorsey, Joe Reichman, and Paul Gayten.

As the big band era wound down and heavy touring became less common among jazz musicians, Butera re-settled in New Orleans, where he played regularly at the 500 Club for four years. The 500 Club was owned by Louis Prima's brother, Leon, and it was this connection that led him to his much-heralded Vegas-based collaborations with Prima and Smith.

Prima transitioned from big band to Vegas somewhat hastily, having signed a contract with the Sahara without having first assembled a back-up band. From his Vegas hotel room, Prima phoned Butera in New Orleans and had him assemble a band posthaste. Butera and the band drove from New Orleans to Las Vegas in such a hurry that they had not taken time to give their act a name. On opening night in 1954, Prima asked Butera before a live audience what the name of his band was. Butera responded spontaneously, "The Witnesses", and the name stuck.

Butera remained the bandleader of The Witnesses for more than twenty years. During that time, he performed with Louis Prima and/or Keely Smith on such Prima-associated songs as "That Old Black Magic", "Just a Gigolo/I Ain't Got Nobody," "Come on-a My House," and "I Wan'na Be Like You" (from Disney's The Jungle Book). Richard and Robert Sherman, composers of the songs for the Disney animated film, agreed to cast Prima, Butera and their band after executives from the Walt Disney Company urged them to travel to Las Vegas to witness the band's live act in person.

Butera is noted for his raucous playing style, his off-color humor, and the innuendo in his lyrics. The arrangement he made with Prima of "Just a Gigolo/I Ain't Got Nobody" has been covered by David Lee Roth, Los Lobos, Brian Setzer, The Village People, and Big Bad Voodoo Daddy. In addition to his accomplishments as a saxophonist and composer, Butera is widely regarded as the inspiration for the vocal style of fellow New Orleans-born jazz singer Harry Connick, Jr.

=== Later career ===
After Prima's death in 1978, Butera renamed his band "The Wildest," and played for another 25 years, mostly at Las Vegas lounges. As Burt Kearns recounts on PleaseKillMe, "He paid tribute to Louis Prima every night, opening each set with 'When You're Smiling' and closing with 'When the Saints Go Marching In,' leading the horn section on a stroll through the audience, slapping palms, shaking hands, and somehow continuing to blow that saxophone, as always, with a smile on his face."

Butera had a featured role in the Cinemax TV special Viva Shaf Vegas (1986), which starred Paul Shaffer. In the show, written by Shaffer, Tom Leopold and Harry Shearer, Butera is asked to help Shaffer with his "spiritual crisis". To analyze Shaffer's problem, Butera asks a series of questions, the last of which is "Are you regular?"

Sam Butera was featured in an episode of Space Ghost Coast to Coast (1997). Butera's advice for the host, Space Ghost's evil twin brother Chad Ghostal, on getting "chicks, like a fox [insert purr]" is "Well, first a little music, a little jive talk. You gotta call her baby, sweetheart, darling, you know all the names that go along with love." When he sang part of "Just a Gigolo," Chad, Zorak, and Moltar found it familiar and Butera began to tell how David Lee Roth stole the song from him. "I wrote that arrangement thirty four years ago, the one that David Lee Roth stole from me. He came in one night to see me, you know, and after the show he walked up to me and said 'Hey Sam!', and I said 'who are you', he said 'I'm David Lee Roth'". "'You know what' I tell him? I said 'give me my money' and he turned right away and walked out." Royalties are paid to songwriters, not arrangers, and the 2 songs making up the arrangement were old standards by the 1950s. Butera's anger towards Roth was equaled by his anger towards journalists, often calling columnists to complain about reviews he didn't like.

Sam Butera appeared in a Joe Piscopo HBO special.

Butera played a part in the movie The Rat Race (1960), starring Debbie Reynolds and Tony Curtis. He played a scam artist along with Joe Bushkin who fleeced Curtis out of his instruments. The music can be heard on the LP and the CD released by Dot as a soundtrack of The Rat Race.

Butera died of pneumonia in Las Vegas, Nevada at the age of 81.

== Selected discography ==
Early 45 rpm releases:

- "Chicken Scratch" // "Easy Rocking" (RCA Victor Records 47-5469, Oct 1953)
- "Wailin' Walk" // "Shine The Buckle" (RCA Victor 47-5545, Nov 1953)
- "I Don't Want To Set The World On Fire" // "(These Are) The Things I Love" (Groove Records 4G-0005, Mar 1954)
- "The Tout" // "Sam's Clam" (Groove 4G-0018, Jun 1954)
- "Sam's Reverie" // "Who's Got The Key" (Groove 4G-0033, Aug 1954)
- "Goin' In" // "Comin' Out" (Cadence Records 1281, Dec 1955)
- "Equator" // "I Kiss Your Hand, Madame" (Prep Records F-102, Apr 1957)
- "Ten Little Women" // "Love Charm" (Prep F-105, May 1957)
- "It's Better Than Nothing At All" // "Good Gracious Baby" (Prep F-134, Feb 1958)

Solo albums with The Witnesses:

- The Big Horn (Capitol Records, 1958)
- The Wildest Clan (Dot Records, 1960)
- Plays Music from "The Rat Race" (Dot, 1960)
- Apache! (Dot, 1961)
- The Big Sax and the Big Voice of Sam Butera (Capitol, 1961)
- When The Feeling Hits You! with Sammy Davis Jr. (Reprise Records, 1964)
- Thinking Man's Sax (Prima One Records, 1964)
- He's Number One! (Prima One, 1974) re-released on Butera's label, Poor Boy Records PB 1000, in 1978.
- Ultra-Lounge – Wild, Cool & Swingin' – Artist Series Volume 6: Sam Butera and The Witnesses (Capitol/EMI, 1999) compilation of Capitol material.

With The Wildest:

-LPs

- By Request (Poor Boy Records PB 1001, 1979)
- Play It Again, Sam! (Poor Boy PB 1002, 1980)
- Atlantic City Special (Poor Boy PB 1003, 1981)
- Love Is In The Air (Poor Boy PB 1004, 1982)
- Body and Sax... with a Little Soul (Poor Boy PB 001, 1984)
- Sam Butera and The Wildest: Live! (Poor Boy PB 1005, 1987)
- A Tribute to Louis Prima, Part 1 (Poor Boy PB 1006, 1987)
- A Tribute to Louis Prima, Part 2 (Poor Boy PB 1007, 1987)

-CDs

- Sheer Energy (Jasmine Records 313, 1992) reissue of PB 1005
- By Request (Jasmine 314, 1992) reissue
- A Tribute to Louis Prima, Volume 1 (Jasmine 319, 1994) reissue
- A Tribute to Louis Prima, Volume 2 (Jasmine 320, 1994) reissue
- The Whole World Loves Italians (USA Music Group 970, 1996)
- On Stage (Get Hip Archive Series 5008, 1996 [1999])
- Still Cookin' (Poor Boy 9109, 2000)

== See also ==
- Italians in New Orleans
