= Paul Burkhard =

Swiss composer (1911–1977)

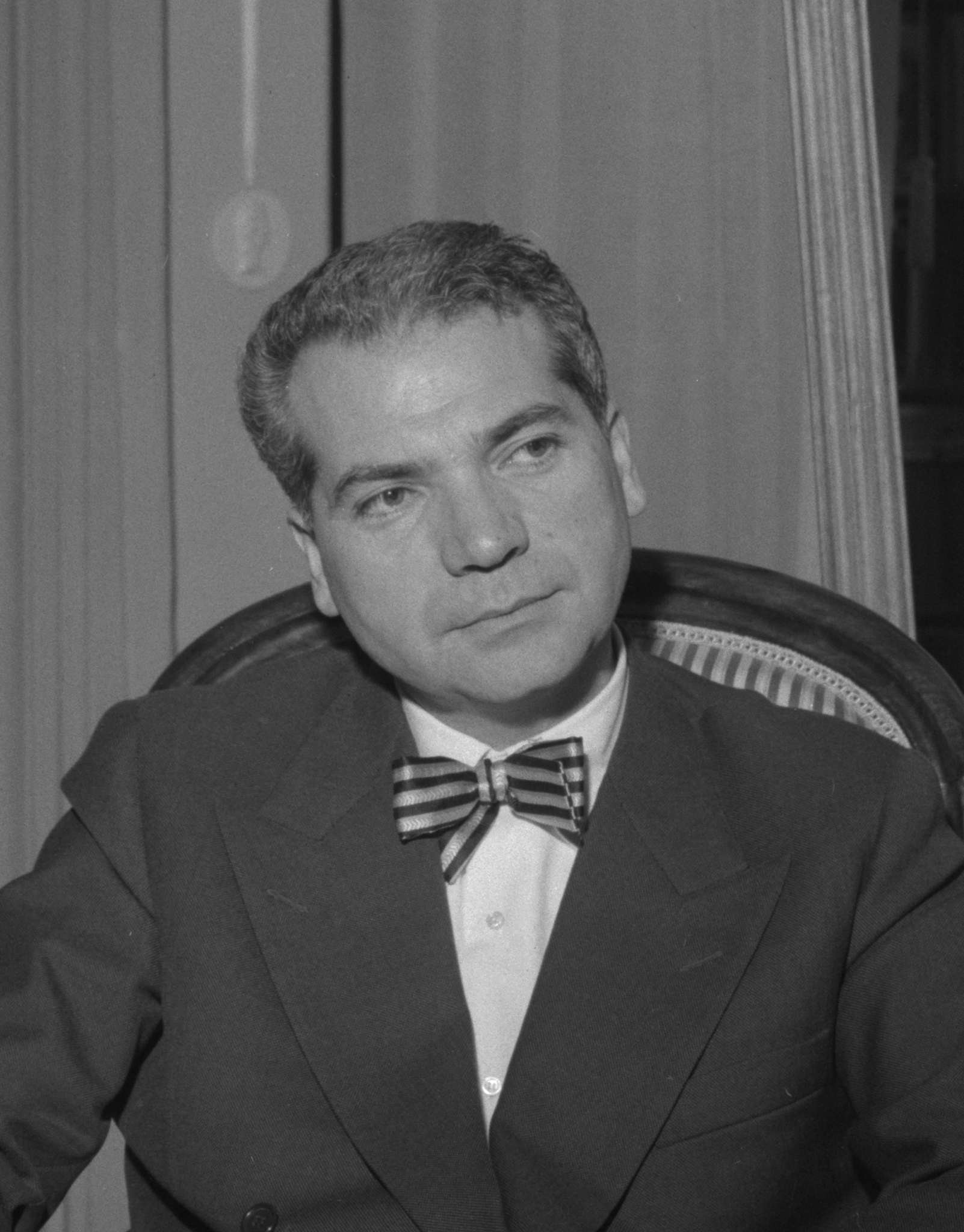
Paul Burkhard

Paul Burkhard (21 December 1911 – 6 September 1977) was a Swiss composer. He primarily wrote oratorios, musicals and operettas. The contemporaneous and similarly named Swiss composer Willy Burkhard was no relation to him.

Probably his most famous artistic creation was the song "O mein Papa" ("Oh! My Pa-Pa") about the death of a beloved clown-father, written for the musical Der schwarze Hecht (re-issued in 1950 as Das Feuerwerk) that premiered in April 1939. The song rose to #1 on the Sheet Music Chart and stayed in the chart for 26 weeks. The song has been performed and recorded by numerous artists since then, including Alan Breeze, Billy Cotton, Billy Vaughn, Connie Francis, Diana Decker, Eddie Calvert, Eddie Fisher, The Everly Brothers, Harry James, Lys Assia, Ray Anthony & his Orchestra, Russ Morgan & his Orchestra, and many others.

== Works (selection) ==
- 1935: Hopsa
- 1950: Das Feuerwerk (Original: Der schwarze Hecht, 1939) with the hit song O mein Papa
- 1951: Die kleine Niederdorf-Oper
- 1960: Frank der Fünfte – Comedy with Music; Oper einer Privatbank, by Friedrich Dürrenmatt
- 1960: D Zäller Wiehnacht – Christmas play
- 1965: Noah – The story of Noah and the Arc – for children
- 1971: Zäller Oschtere – Passion play
