= The Shelter of Your Arms =

Studio album by Sammy Davis Jr.
- Released: 1964
- Recorded: 1964
- Genre: Jazz
- Length: 32:24
- Label: Reprise

Sammy Davis Jr. chronology
Sammy Davis Jr. Salutes the Stars of the London Palladium (1963)	The Shelter of Your Arms (1964)	Sammy Davis Jr. Sings Mel Tormé's "California Suite" (1964)

Professional ratings
Review scores
Source	Rating
AllMusic	4/5 stars

The Shelter of Your Arms is a 1964 album by Sammy Davis Jr.

== Charts ==
=== Album ===
The album debuted on Billboard magazine's Top LP's chart in the issue dated April 4, 1964, peaking at No. 26 during an eighteen-week run on the chart.

=== Single ===
The title track reached No. 3 on the R&B singles chart, No. 7 on the Easy Listening chart and No. 17 on the Billboard Hot 100 the weeks of March 7 and 14, 1964.

== Track listing ==
No.	Title	Writer(s)	Length
1.	"Bee-Bom"	Les Vandyke	2:22
2.	"Make Someone Happy"	Betty Comden, Adolph Green, Jule Styne	3:00
3.	"The Party's Over"	Betty Comden, Adolph Green, Jule Styne	4:17
4.	"Some Days Everything Goes Wrong"	Ervin Drake	2:50
5.	"The Shelter of Your Arms"	Jerry Samuels	2:52
6.	"A Man With a Dream"	Stella Unger, Victor Young	2:57
7.	"That's for Me"	Oscar Hammerstein II, Richard Rodgers	3:11
8.	"If I Loved You"	Hammerstein, Rodgers	3:58
9.	"Come On Strong"	Sammy Cahn, Jimmy Van Heusen	2:37
10.	"I Married an Angel"	Lorenz Hart, Rodgers	2:00
11.	"Guys and Dolls"	Frank Loesser	2:09
