= Hair (Lady Gaga song) =

Promotional single by Lady Gaga

from the album Born This Way
- Released: May 16, 2011
- Recorded: 2010
- Studio: Tour Bus (Europe)
- Genre: Disco; Europop; synth-rock
- Length: 5:08
- Label: Streamline; Interscope; KonLive
- Songwriters: Lady Gaga; RedOne
- Producers: Lady Gaga; RedOne

Audio video
- "Hair" on YouTube

"Hair" is a song recorded by American singer Lady Gaga for her second studio album, Born This Way (2011). Written and produced by herself and RedOne, "Hair" was released worldwide digitally on May 16, 2011, as a promotional single from the album, as part of the iTunes Store's "Countdown to Born This Way" release. This was after the previous promotional release, "The Edge of Glory", was made the third single from the album.

According to Lady Gaga, the melody of "Hair" resembles the work of metal bands Kiss and Iron Maiden, and is also influenced by Bruce Springsteen. The song is an uptempo club record inspired by Gaga's experience as a teenager, when her parents forced her to dress in a certain way. Gaga found that the only way to express herself was through her hair, and she described it as a song about liberation and her ability to change her ways. The lyrics talk about embracing one's hairstyle as their ultimate expression of freedom. "Hair" was recorded while Gaga was on tour with The Monster Ball throughout Europe. The song features a saxophone solo performed by saxophonist Clarence Clemons, a prominent member of The E Street Band. She personally wanted Clemons to play saxophone on the song, which he did by recording his part at a Manhattan studio at midnight, after he had just flown there from his home in Florida.

"Hair" has been critically appreciated for its message of self-liberation, individualism and empowerment, though some felt that the usage of the term hair to express these messages was not particularly new. "Hair" charted in most musical markets, reaching the top-ten in Italy, Norway, New Zealand and Spain, while in other nations, it charted within the top-twenty, including the United Kingdom and the Billboard Hot 100 of the United States. Gaga performed the song on Good Morning America as part of their "Summer Concert Series", on Paul O'Grady Live in the United Kingdom, and on The Howard Stern Show. Later the song was added to the set list of Gaga's Born This Way Ball tour (2012–2013).

== Background and release ==
"Hair" was written and produced by Gaga and RedOne, and the name of the song was revealed through an interview with Vogue magazine in February 2011. On The Graham Norton Show, Gaga explained the origin of the song, which involves the analogy of her hair with freedom, and how that is the only part of her body she can change without anyone judging her. According to a press listening in February, "Hair" draws inspiration from Pat Benatar's "We Belong", while thematically focusing on empowering lyrics similar to those of "Born This Way". Gaga elaborated on the song's inspiration further with a video posted on her Twitter account: "When I was a kid, I used to always come down the stairs of my parents' house, and they would say, 'Go back upstairs and brush your hair, change your clothes, you can't go out wearing that', and I felt like it was stifling my identity... My hair was my glory. It was the only thing that I could change about myself."

Initially "Hair" was supposed to be released as the second promotional single from Born This Way, following "The Edge of Glory", on May 16, 2011. However, after its release to the digital stores, "The Edge of Glory" started selling considerable amount of digital downloads, prompting Gaga to make it the third single from Born This Way. Hence, "Hair" became the first promotional release from the album. Gaga noted that although "Hair" was not planned to be an official single, it could be released as such, if it was to sell well at the digital outlets like "The Edge of Glory". Gaga also revealed her artwork for "Hair" on May 13, 2011, on her Twitter account. The black and white cover features a pink-haired Gaga lying upside down on the floor in a sharp-edged leather outfit, which features protruding nipple spikes. It was photographed by her longtime collaborator and friend Nick Knight. Later on in the same day, Gaga tweeted the line: "The Born This Way Itunes Countdown will release my song HAIR 2moro 1pm PST."

== Recording and composition ==
During an interview with Ryan Seacrest on his radio program On Air with Ryan Seacrest, Gaga described "Hair" as an up-tempo club record, with Bruce Springsteen overtones to it. She also revealed the involvement of Clarence Clemons playing sax on the record. Other influences included metal bands like Kiss and Iron Maiden on the melody. She revealed some of the lines of the song on Seacrest's show, "This is my prayer, that I'll die living just as free as my hair", adding that the composition of "Hair" was interesting since it was juxtaposing saxophone with a dance record. In an interview with radio station Z-100 she added, "Some of those themes are explored more on this album. To put my money where my mouth is." Gaga's references for the saxophone solo was the music of E Street Band and Bruce Springsteen; to her they represented a different genre of music, at the same time encompassing all the different elements of it. She ultimately decided to ask Clemons from E Street Band to play the instrument.

"Hair"
A 28-second sample of "Hair", where Gaga sings the chorus and ends with declaring "I'm as free as my hair".

With Rolling Stone, Clemons described how he recorded the saxophone solo with Gaga. In January 2011, Clemons was putting together an exercise machine in his Florida house when his wife told him that Gaga's representatives were on the phone, and they wanted him to play on her upcoming album. Since the call was on a Friday, Clemons replied that he would be able to record it on the coming week, but Gaga was adamant to have him at the New York recording studio on that day itself. After accepting her request, Clemons went to New York and reached the recording studio in Manhattan at midnight. Gaga wanted him to play saxophone on multiple tracks, one of them being "Hair". Before Clemons started work on the song, she explained the lyrics to him. "It made so much sense," he said. "It's a story about growing up." She gave him few instructions about how to play on the song, saying "'We'll put the tape on and you just play. Play from your heart. Play what you feel.'". The recording was finished by 3:00 am, after a few takes. Clemons added that he was surprised for "getting paid for this. I would have done it for free. I can never believe something that feels so good earns me money." According to the sheet music published at Musicnotes.com by Sony/ATV Music Publishing, the song is written in the time signature of common time. It is composed in the key of F major, with a tempo of 135 beats per minute. Gaga's vocals span from E_{3} to D_{5}, and the song follows a basic sequence of F–C–Dm–B♭ as its chord progression.

"Hair" was recorded mostly while Gaga was on tour in Europe, but the mixing was done by Gene Grimaldi at Oasis Mastering in Burbank, California. The song that starts slowly before shifting into Gaga's dance-oriented style. Gaga sings, "Whenever I dress cool, my parents put up a fight / And if I'm a hot shot, Mom will cut my hair at night / And in the morning I'm short of my identity / I scream, 'Mom and Dad, why can't I be who I want to be?'" as the music grows louder. The song later enters a retro-styled breakdown, during which she sings about the different hairstyles she has had. Jocelyn Vena from MTV described the track as a "fist-pumping, defiant disco track all about having a good time." Matthew Perpetua from Rolling Stone called it a mixture of yearning romantic melodrama of "We Belong" with the hard industrial metal edge of Broken-era Nine Inch Nails. Greg Kot of the Chicago Tribune felt that Gaga's vocals are Auto-Tuned throughout the song. The lyrics of "Hair" talk about embracing one's hairstyle as the ultimate expression of their identity, hence it ends with Gaga triumphantly declaring "I am my hair!" at the end of the final chorus.

== Critical reception ==
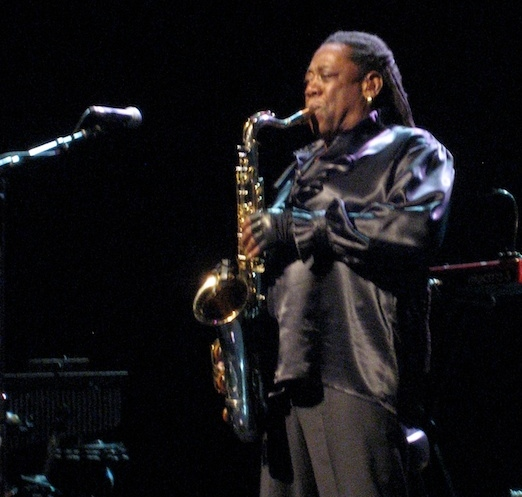
Clarence Clemons' saxophone solo was a notable feature in "Hair".

"Hair" has received mostly positive reviews. An hour before starting the final leg of The Monster Ball Tour, Gaga sent four tracks to Rolling Stone, including “Hair”, "Scheiße", "You and I", and "The Edge of Glory", for a preview. Matthew Perpetua wrote a positive review of "Hair", describing it as another inspirational song in the mold of "Born This Way", but felt that it was a bit weirder. Perpetua concluded the review by jokingly adding that the song will become "[a]n anthem for salons everywhere." Jody Rosen from the same publication felt that "although Gaga is not the first singer to create a connection between self-esteem and liberation to free-flowing coiffure, she seems to be the most committed to the idea." Dan Martin from NME classified "Hair" as an empowerment anthem, using the "simple image of the wind blowing through a person’s hair to illuminate the album’s Love-Yourself-And-Let-It-All-Hang-Out message way more effectively than the title track. It trumps it once again by being quite the gayest thing you will ever hear for a long time." Tim Jonze from The Guardian felt that the message of "Hair" was not particularly a new one, since the 60's musical Hair also preached the same message. Although he described some of the lyrics as "trite", Jonze opined that "these weaknesses can also be strengths, and there's something admirable about the way the [track] address confused teenagers in search of their identity." Writing for The Vancouver Sun, Leah Collins described the song as "a pumping anthem designed to pump up your follicles with pride." She added that the overall feel of the song was that of retro dance music.

Natalie Finn from E! Online was disappointed with the track, feeling that although the releases from Born This Way were not that "catchy", all of them were about the same subject of "the importance of being ourselves. Oh well, maybe we're just waiting for the next 'Bad Romance' to sweep us off our feet. Or the next 'Speechless' to make us cry. Or even the next 'Just Dance' to really make us want to dance." Jason Lipshultz from Billboard felt that the track was another anthem for individualism, with Gaga's hair used as a metaphor for her wild personality. Sal Cinquemani from Slant Magazine gave a mixed review stating that the song is a "derivative but perfectly serviceable club track about highlights that's turned into a dumping ground for every bad idea Gaga's had in the last 12 months: schmaltzy piano-woman melodies, overwrought choruses, inexplicable sax solos." Rick Fulton, while writing in the Daily Record, called "Hair" a "great tune" and a "Europop high-energy epic", while giving it four out of five points. Ian Hope from BBC Online described "Hair" as an "empowering freeway rocker about self expression." The Independent writer Andy Gill compared the song to those by guitarist David Crosby, and described it as a statement of rebellious individuality. According to Los Angeles Times' Randall Roberts, Gaga "celebrates her follicles" in the song.

== Chart performance ==
"Hair" charted in most musical markets and its debut became its peak position; the song was present for a maximum of two weeks. In the United Kingdom, "Hair" debuted at number 13 on the UK Singles Chart. Along with the song, Gaga's other singles—"The Edge of Glory", "Judas" and "Born This Way"—were all within the top twenty on the chart, making Gaga the first female artist since Ruby Murray in 1955, to have four songs simultaneously within the top twenty. As of March 2020, the song has sold 50,000 copies and acquired 2.3 million streams. In Australia, "Hair" debuted at number 20 on the ARIA Singles Chart and was present for two weeks in the top-fifty. In the Netherlands, "Hair" debuted at number 15 on the Single Top 100 chart, and at number 14 on the Irish Singles Chart.

In the United States, "Hair" debuted at number five on the Hot Digital Songs chart with first-week sales of 147,000 copies. Consequently it entered the Billboard Hot 100 at number 12, becoming the highest debuting single of the week. According to Nielsen SoundScan, "Hair" has sold 174,000 copies of digital downloads as of January 2012. In Canada, the song sold 15,000 digital downloads, and entered the Canadian Hot 100 at number 11, as the highest debut of the week. "Hair" also reached the top ten in the charts of Italy, New Zealand, Norway, Scotland and Spain, and top twenty in Belgium (Flanders and Wallonia region) and France. Its lowest position was on the Danish Singles Chart at number 29, and in the Gaon International download chart of South Korea, it reached a peak position of number 21.

== Live performances ==
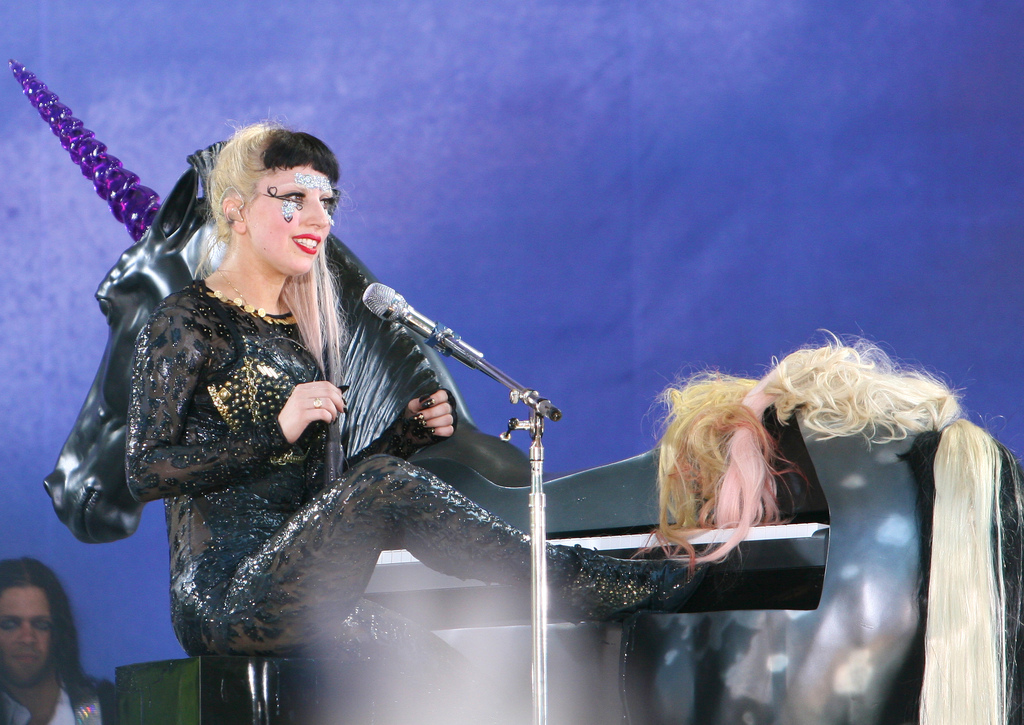
Gaga performing "Hair" at the Good Morning America concert, while playing on her unicorn piano, covered with wigs

On May 27, 2011, Gaga performed the song on Good Morning America as a part of their "Summer Concert Series". She was dressed in purple horns and a black and blond ponytail, and was placed atop a black staircase, with her leg perched on top of a black unicorn shaped piano. Dedicating the song to her mother, Gaga sang an acoustic version of "Hair", which Sheila Marikar from ABC News reviewed positively, saying that it "really brought the house down." Christian Blauvelt from Entertainment Weekly was also impressed with the acoustic version, saying that "at a keyboard, Gaga's never better at injecting enough passion and commitment to sell even the corniest lyrics about follicular empowerment."

Gaga performed "Hair" on The Paul O'Grady Show on June 17, 2011. The song was the first of the four performances planned, and Gaga opened the show with her sitting on the piano. She appeared bald but wore a teal colored fringed dress, and sang an acoustic version of "Hair", while staring at a teal colored wig placed in front of her. Halfway through the performance, Gaga took the wig and placed it on her head. Ryan Love of Digital Spy had a preview of the recording of the show, and commented that when "it's just GaGa [sic] on the piano, you can't help but be impressed." Cynthia Robinson from The Huffington Post theorized that Gaga pretending to be bald was not a "fashion statement", instead she was "saying something about shedding that skin, that costume, that barrier that she created with all of her vaunted costumes—at least so that people know what she is inside before putting it back on."

At French television show Taratata, Gaga performed “Hair” while playing the piano. She appeared in the show in a long turquoise blue wig, that was attached to a replica of the Eiffel Tower, with the word "Paris" written on her chest. After performing the song, she improvised part of the track in French. During her promotional performances of the songs from Born This Way in Taiwan, Gaga sang "Hair" and played the piano in a black bra, against the backdrop of many red lanterns and a red arch, a set created specially for the Taiwan show. She later explained in a press conference the inspiration behind the performance: "Like the gentleman [the host] just mentioned, that lantern means prosperity and it's about the future. I'm always thinking about the future of my generation and the voice of my generation when I write music."

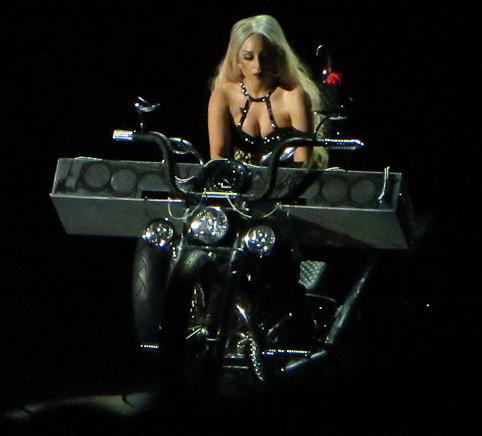
Gaga performing "Hair" on a keyboard mounted on a motorcycle during the Born This Way Ball tour (2012–2013)

At the iHeartRadio Music Festival in Las Vegas on September 24, 2011, Gaga dedicated a performance of "Hair" to deceased teenager Jamey Rodemeyer, who had committed suicide after being constantly bullied by his peers at school for being gay. An image of Rodemeyer was shown on the backdrop as Gaga announced: "We lost a Little Monster this week. I wrote this record about how your identity is really all you've got when you're in school... so tonight, Jamey, I know you're up there looking at us, and you're not a victim... you're a lesson to all of us. I know it's a bit of a downer, but sometimes the right thing is more important than the music", after which she sang a piano version of "Hair".

The song was also included in the setlist of her Born This Way Ball tour (2012–2013), where she played the song on a keyboard that was installed on a motorbike. To Kwaak Je-yup of The Korea Times was positive about the performance of the song during the tour saying that, "The highlight of the night was her first slow jam 'Hair,' which she introduced as her favorite track on the 'Born This Way' album. (...) She flubbed her line once and admitted it right away — 'I'm getting too excited (that) I forgot my lines,' she said — but the moment made the experience personal." On the second night of Gaga's show in the Philippines, she addressed the protests by Christian groups against her performances in the country, directly before performing "Hair". While playing the piano she stated that she is aware of the issues around her image and music, she emphasized that she respects all kinds of religion, people and culture – including Filipino culture. She also said that she respects that everyone is entitled to their own opinion, but stressed "What I don’t respect is homophobia and hatred…I reject intolerance to the gay community." This drew cheers from the audience. She went on to say that she is aware some are using her name to spread hatred but intended to counter this by continuing to spread "positivity" in her own way.

In 2025, Gaga performed "Hair" on the piano at select dates of The Mayhem Ball tour.

== Credits and personnel ==
Credits adapted from the liner notes of Born This Way.

- Lady Gaga – vocals, songwriter and producer
- Nadir "RedOne" Khayat – songwriter, producer, vocal editing, vocal arrangement, background vocals, audio engineering, instrumentation, programming and recording at Tour Bus in Europe
- Trevor Muzzy – guitar, recording, vocal editing, audio engineering, audio mixing at Larrabee, North Hollywood, Los Angeles, California
- Dave Russell – recording and audio engineering
- Clarence Clemons – saxophone
- Gene Grimaldi – audio mastering at Oasis Mastering, Burbank, California

== Charts ==
Weekly chart performance for "Hair"
Chart (2011)	Peak position
Australia (ARIA)	20
Belgium (Ultratop 50 Flanders)	19
Belgium (Ultratop 50 Wallonia)	11
Canada Hot 100 (Billboard)	11
Denmark (Tracklisten)	29
Finland Download (Latauslista)	21
France (SNEP)	16
Ireland (IRMA)	14
Italy (FIMI)	5
Netherlands (Dutch Top 40 Tipparade)	17
Netherlands (Single Top 100)	15
New Zealand (Recorded Music NZ)	9
Norway (VG-lista)	5
Scottish Singles Sales (Official Charts)	10
South Korea International (GAON)	21
Spain (Promusicae)	9
UK Singles (Official Charts)	13
US Billboard Hot 100	12

== Sales ==
Region	Certification	Certified units/sales
South Korea (Gaon)	—	133,367
