= Born This Way (album) =

2011 studio album by Lady Gaga

- Standard edition cover (Note: Special editions show a close up of Gaga's head. The tenth anniversary cover excludes the title and has a slightly darker tint to the image.)

Studio album by Lady Gaga
- Released: May 23, 2011
- Recorded: 2010–2011
- Studios: Abbey Road (London); Germano Studios The Hit Factory (New York City); Studio at the Palms (Las Vegas); Gang (Paris); The Mix Room (Burbank); Studios 301 (Sydney); Setai (Miami Beach); Sing Sing (Melbourne); Paradise (Sydney); Officine Mechaniche (Milan); Livingroom (Oslo); Warehouse Productions (Omaha); Tour Bus (Europe); Studio Bus
- Genres: Synth-pop; electropop; dance-pop; electronic rock
- Length: 61:07
- Labels: Streamline; KonLive; Interscope
- Producers: Lady Gaga; Fernando Garibay; Paul Blair aka DJ White Shadow; RedOne; Jeppe Laursen; Robert John "Mutt" Lange

Lady Gaga chronology
The Remix (2010)	Born This Way (2011)	Born This Way: The Remix (2011)

Singles from Born This Way
- 1. "Born This Way" Released: February 11, 2011; 2. "Judas" Released: April 15, 2011; 3. "The Edge of Glory" Released: May 9, 2011; 4. "You and I" Released: August 23, 2011; 5. "Marry the Night" Released: November 11, 2011; 6. "Bloody Mary" Released: December 2, 2022

Born This Way is the second studio album by American singer Lady Gaga. (Note: Occasionally, Gaga's debut album The Fame (2008) and its reissue The Fame Monster (2009) are counted separately, which would make Born This Way her third studio album.) It was released by Interscope Records on May 23, 2011. Gaga co-wrote and co-produced it with other producers, including Fernando Garibay and RedOne, who had previously worked with her. She also worked with musicians including E Street Band saxophonist Clarence Clemons and Queen guitarist Brian May. Gaga and Garibay served as the album's musical directors.

The music on Born This Way builds on the synth-pop, electropop, and dance-pop styles of Gaga's previous material while incorporating instrumentation different from that of her earlier releases, including electronic rock and techno. It features a broader range of genres, such as heavy metal, disco, house, and rock and roll, while its lyrical topics include sexuality, religion, freedom, feminism, and individualism. Despite divided opinions among religious and conservative commentators, the album was well received by music critics, who praised the varying musical styles and Gaga's vocals. Several music publications included the album in their year-end best-of lists. Born This Way received three Grammy Award nominations, including Gaga's third consecutive nomination for Album of the Year. In 2020, Rolling Stone included it in their updated list of the 500 Greatest Albums of All Time.

Born This Way debuted atop several major music charts worldwide, including the US Billboard 200, where the record sold 1.108 million copies in its first week; an estimated 440,000 copies were sold on Amazon in two days of its first week at a price of 99 cents. It has since been certified quadruple platinum by the Recording Industry Association of America (RIAA). Four of the album's singles—the title track, "Judas", "The Edge of Glory", and "You and I"—reached the top ten of the Billboard Hot 100 in the US, where "Born This Way" remained at number one for six weeks. At the time of its release, the title track was the fastest-selling single in iTunes history. The fifth single, "Marry the Night", charted within the top 30 in the United States. After going viral on the video-sharing service TikTok, "Bloody Mary" was released as the album's sixth single in 2022, eleven years after the album's release. According to the International Federation of the Phonographic Industry (IFPI), Born This Way was the third global best-selling album of 2011. As of 2021, it had more than 5.8 billion global streams, 5.2 million physical copies sold, and 31 million digital tracks sold.

Gaga performed songs from the album on various occasions, such as the 53rd Annual Grammy Awards and the 2011 MTV Video Music Awards, as well as on television worldwide and at other events, including her third headlining concert tour, the Born This Way Ball (2012–2013). In November 2011, Born This Way and its remix album Born This Way: The Remix were packaged as a compilation album titled Born This Way: The Collection. On June 25, 2021, Gaga released Born This Way The Tenth Anniversary, a special anniversary edition of the album featuring six renditions of Gaga's songs by artists who are members or allies of the LGBT community.

== Background and recording ==
Lady Gaga released her first studio album, The Fame, in August 2008. It received generally favorable reviews from critics and topped the charts in several countries. After its worldwide success, a reissue of the album, titled The Fame Monster, was released in November 2009, which also received positive reviews. Gaga described them as yin and yang because their styles and concepts contrasted.

In March 2010, Gaga said that she was working on a new album, saying that she had written most of the songs for this project. Meanwhile, producer RedOne described it as Gaga's "freedom album" as her then-manager, Troy Carter, felt her public image would begin to change after the album's release. A few months later, Gaga said that she had finished writing songs for the album: "It came so quickly. I've been working on it for months, and I feel very strongly that it's finished right now. Some artists take years. I don't. I write music every day." She first alluded to Born This Way during a SHOWstudio interview that year, answering what she would call the movie of her life. In another interview, she declared the album "the anthem of [this] generation," adding, "It includes the greatest music I've ever written. I've already written the first single for the new album and I promise you, that this album is the greatest of my career."

Born This Way was written and recorded during the Monster Ball Tour (2009–2011). In addition to sessions on tour buses, recording and mixing for the album took place at several studios: Abbey Road Studios in London, England; Germano Studios in New York City, The Mix Room in Burbank, California, Studio at the Palms in Las Vegas, Henson Studios in Los Angeles, Larrabee in North Hollywood, Los Angeles, Setai Recording in Miami Beach, Warehouse Productions in Omaha, all in the United States; Gang Studios in Paris, France; Studios 301 and Paradise in Sydney, Sing Sing Studios in Melbourne, all in Australia; Officine Meccaniche in Milan, Italy; and Livingroom Studios in Oslo, Norway. All mastering happened at Oasis Mastering in Burbank. Queen guitarist Brian May and E Street Band saxophonist Clarence Clemons worked with Gaga on the album.

== Writing and composition ==
=== Influences and themes ===
Major musical influences on Born This Way

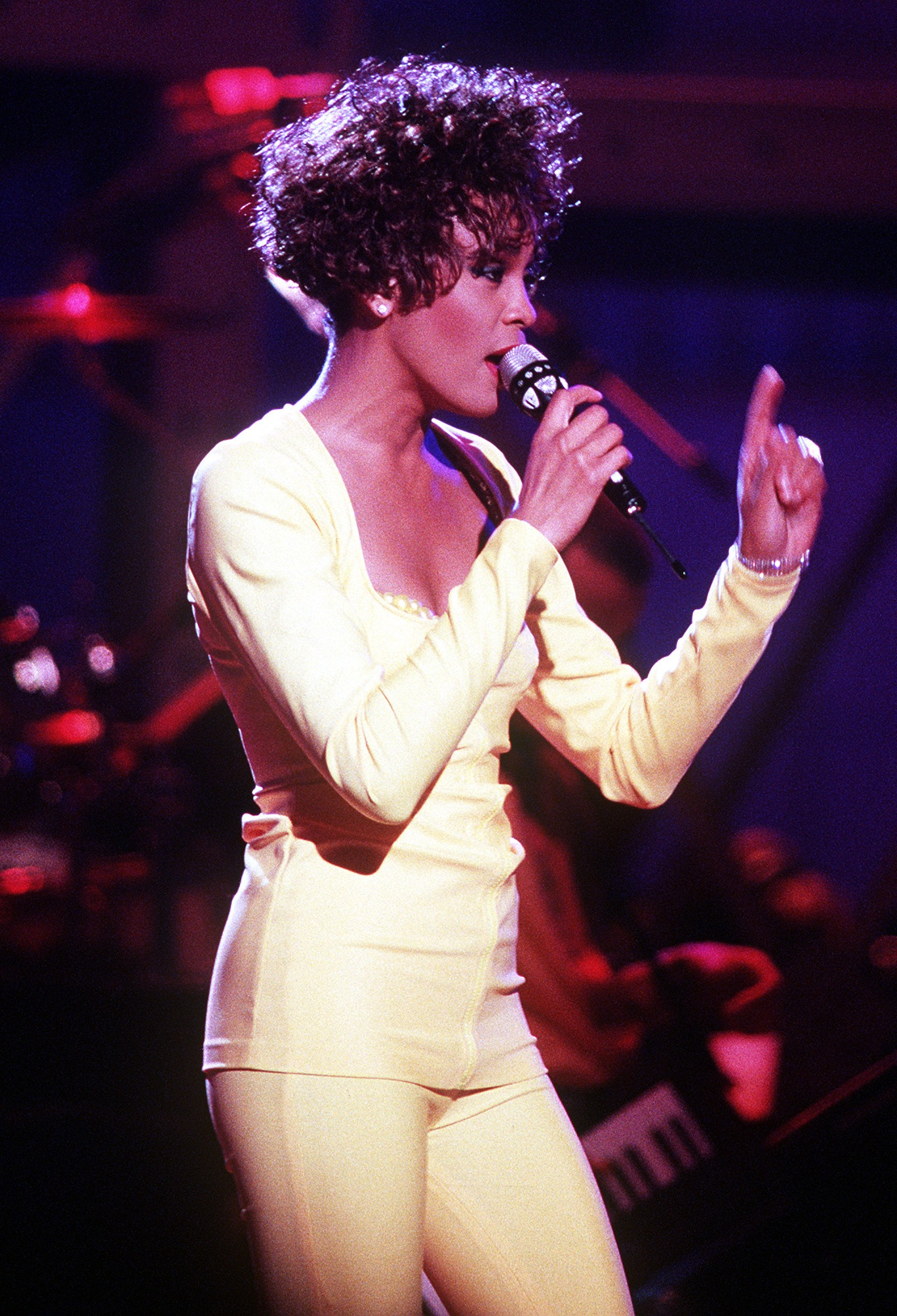
In songs such as "Marry the Night" and "Fashion of His Love" Gaga is influenced by Whitney Houston (pictured in 1991)

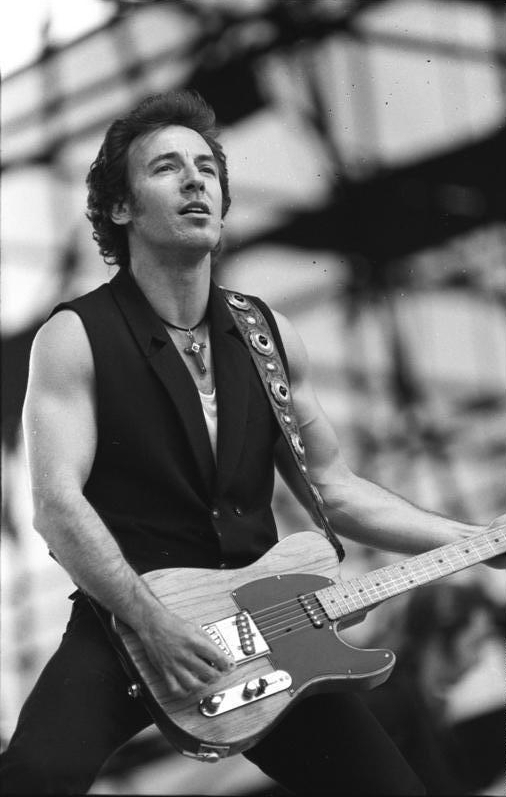
Bruce Springsteen (pictured in 1988) has prominent influences on the album, notably in songs including "Hair" and "The Edge of Glory"

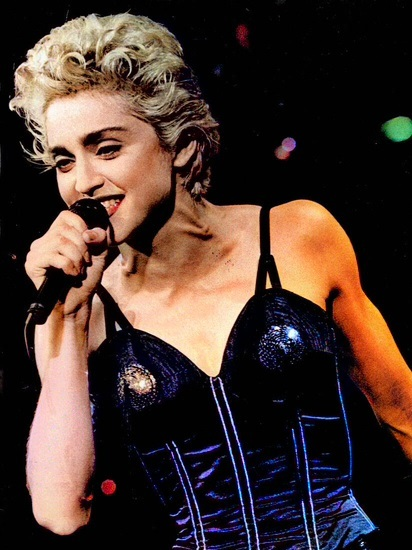
Madonna's (pictured in 1987) influence can be heard in songs such as "Born This Way" and "Scheiße"

Musically, Born This Way is considered a notable departure from Gaga's previous works. It incorporates a broader range of musical genres such as opera, heavy metal, rock and roll, Europop, electro-industrial, disco, and house and features a wider variety of instrumentation and musical styles. For example, an organ can be heard as Gaga closes "Born This Way", a Gregorian chant-inspired male vocal choir is a prominent feature in "Bloody Mary", guitars and violins in "Americano", and electric guitars in "Bad Kids". The songs "Hair" and "The Edge of Glory" are distinguishable from the rest of the album, as a saxophone – performed by Clemons, a prominent E Street Band member – can be heard throughout.

In several interviews, Gaga said she was mainly inspired by Madonna, Whitney Houston, and Bruce Springsteen; other musical influences on the album include Prince, Iron Maiden, Kiss, Queen, TLC, Pat Benatar, and En Vogue. At the 53rd Annual Grammy Awards, while accepting the award for Best Pop Vocal Album for The Fame Monster (2009), Gaga thanked Houston, "I wanted to thank Whitney because when I wrote 'Born This Way', I imagined she was singing it because I wasn't secure enough in myself to imagine I was a superstar. So Whitney I imagined you were singing 'Born This Way' when I wrote it. Thank you." In May 2021, during the 10th anniversary of the album, she revealed that it was inspired by Carl Bean and his song "I Was Born This Way", released in 1977. On her social media, Gaga wrote, "Born This Way, my song and album, were inspired by Carl Bean, a gay black religious activist who preached, sang and wrote about being Born This Way."

The album mainly contains moderate-tempo dance songs, described by MTV's James Dinh as "anthemic style melodies with really sledge-hammering dance beats." In the months before the release of Born This Way, Gaga characterized her new music as "something so much deeper than a wig or lipstick or a fucking meat dress" and upon hearing it, Akon remarked that she would take music to the "next level". The album includes references to several religious figures of Christianity, notably Judas Iscariot, Mary Magdalene, and Jesus of Nazareth. Several songs on the album refer to sexuality and feminism. Other themes on the album include individualism, equality, and freedom.

=== Music and lyrical content ===
It's like Whitney, but imagine if Bruce Springsteen had a baby with Whitney Houston – that's what it is. And that was it! We made a baby. Finally. After all that fornication, miserably long and tedious, Fernando and I finally conceived.

— Lady Gaga, on "Marry the Night"

The standard edition of Born This Way has 14 tracks; the deluxe edition includes eight additional tracks—three original songs, an alternate version of the title track, and four remixes. Fernando Garibay, one of the producers, revealed that each song on the album was revised "about 50 times", as Gaga wanted to try different genres and sounds. Born This Way opens with "Marry the Night", a song written as a homage to New York City. It is a dance-pop record which contains church bells, a thumping four-on-the-floor house beat, a funk rock-influenced breakdown, and contains elements of disco, techno, funk and Hi-NRG music. Owen Myers of Pitchfork described it as "an enormous, bravura flex of electronic pop." Jody Rosen from Rolling Stone compared the song's sound to that of 1980s pop and glam metal artists, including Bon Jovi, Pat Benatar and Bonnie Tyler. The title track, "Born This Way", is about equality, regardless of skin color, sexuality, or creed, and that everyone can fulfill their dreams. Compared to Madonna's "Express Yourself" (1989) by some critics, the song features Euro disco beats. "Government Hooker" contains elements of opera music, and a dance melody resembling genres such as techno, trance, industrial and post-disco, as well as a hip hop-influenced beat. The song was compared by Los Angeles Times's Randall Roberts to the work of German electronic band Kraftwerk. It is followed by "Judas", which Gaga said was influenced by the Biblical Judas Iscariot. The song's lyrics concern betrayal and "honoring your darkness in order to bring yourself into the light," according to Gaga. It is a dance-pop and house track, with influences from techno, industrial and disco, a 1980s-inspired pop chorus, as well as a breakdown with elements of dubstep and techno music.

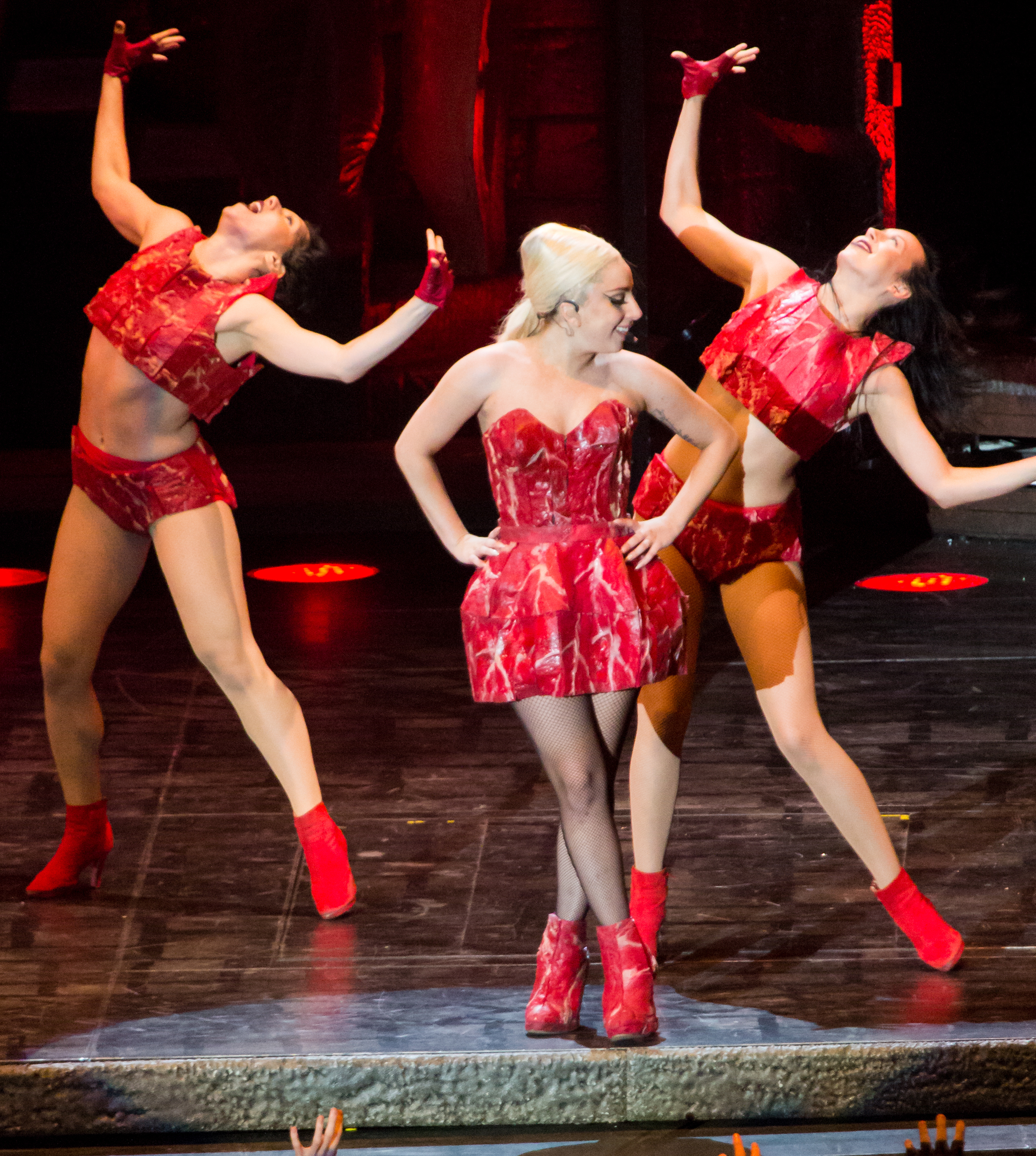
Gaga performing "Americano" on the Born This Way Ball tour (2012–2013). The song was written in response to Arizona SB 1070

The album's fifth track is "Americano", a mariachi song with techno, house and disco influences. Sung in Spanish and English, Gaga composed "Americano" in response to the Arizona immigration law Arizona SB 1070. Critics noted vaudevillian elements within the song, and it has been compared to the work of Judy Garland by Billboard, with Gaga said she heard the influence of French chanson singer Édith Piaf. "Hair" is a song about expressing freedom through one's hair. The song has a dance-pop melody, with influences from rock/heavy metal music artists like Springsteen, Iron Maiden and Kiss. It also incorporates disco and Europop. "Scheiße", contains faux-German lyrics and a feminist message, accompanied by heavy synths, techno beats, as well as Euro disco influences. Dan Martin from NME stated that the song's melody drew comparisons to Madonna and electroclash artist Miss Kittin. After "Scheiße" is "Bloody Mary", which is a relatively slow-tempo and dark electropop song containing "plucked strings" and "filthy beats", as well as numerous religious references, a trance-influenced melody, and lyrics infused in French and Spanish. "Bad Kids" contains 1980s synthpop influences and electric guitars. Martin also compared its disco beat to the music of Donna Summer, and noted heavy metal influences in its composition.

"Highway Unicorn (Road to Love)" is Born This Way's tenth track. A dance-pop song, it has Springsteen influences by Rolling Stone's Rosen, as well as powerful drums and synths. The next is "Heavy Metal Lover", a song of electropop and techno tendencies, which contains elements of house music, electro-industrial beats, and was compared to the power pop of the 1990s. Synthesizers are the song's focal point. Following "Heavy Metal Lover" is "Electric Chapel", a heavy metal-influenced pop song noted to contain elements of Europop that was compared by some reviewers to Madonna's work. "You and I", is a rock and roll ballad which contains elements of country rock. The song contains a moderato tempo, and Queen guitarist May is also featured on it. The song also samples Queen's 1977 single "We Will Rock You".

The fourteenth track is "The Edge of Glory", which was inspired by the death of Gaga's grandfather. It is an upbeat dance-pop, electronic rock, and synth-pop song; it also contains a saxophone solo by Clemons which drew comparisons to blues music. One of the bonus tracks is "Black Jesus + Amen Fashion", a pop song which draws influences from 1980s and 1990s electronic and club music, including Broadway. "Fashion of His Love" is a 1980s-influenced dance-pop song that contains references to the late fashion designer Alexander McQueen. The last bonus track is "The Queen", a synth-rock song about self-confidence and bravery.

== Release and promotion ==
On September 12, 2010, Gaga appeared at the 2010 MTV Video Music Awards. During her acceptance speech for her Video of the Year award, she announced the title of the album and sang the chorus of its title track. Described by the singer as "a Christmas gift for my fans", Gaga announced the release dates of the album and its lead single at midnight on January 1, 2011, via Twitter, accompanying the announcement with a black-and-white photograph in which MTV detailed that Gaga is "nude from the waist down, with her hair blowing about, and sporting a jacket with the name of the album emblazoned in what looks like bedazzled jewels."

At a November 2010 show of the Monster Ball Tour in Gdańsk, Poland, Gaga announced that the album could have as many as 20 tracks, adding that production for the album was coming to a close. In an interview with Vogue in February 2011, she confirmed that there would be a total of seventeen tracks on the album, of which fourteen would make the final cut to the standard edition. The other three songs were initially to be released on an exclusive deluxe edition of the album at Target; however, Gaga later ended her partnership with Target in response to the company's donation of US$150,000 to the conservative political group Minnesota Forward.

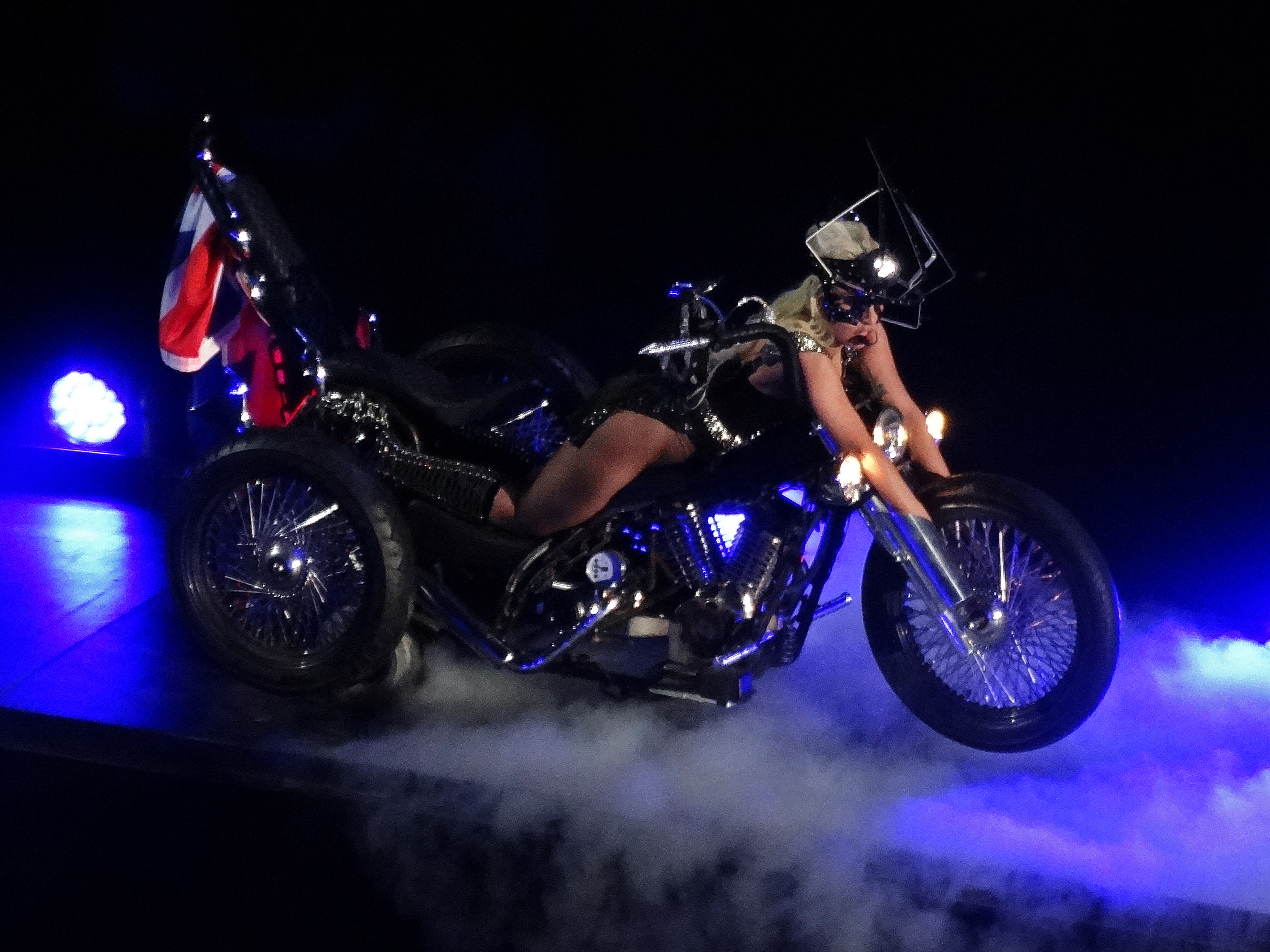
Gaga recreating the album cover art during the performance of track "Heavy Metal Lover" at the Born This Way Ball

Prior to the release of Born This Way, the contents of the album were leaked online on May 18, 2011, due to an exclusive stream session for subscribers of the British newspaper Metro. Several non-singles songs were previewed as part of promoting Born This Way. Remixes of "Scheiße" and "Government Hooker" were previewed at fashion shows presented by Thierry Mugler in January and March 2011, respectively. Several songs were released on the social network game FarmVille in the days before the album's release, including "Marry the Night", "Americano", and "Electric Chapel".

On April 17, 2011, Gaga tweeted her selection for the cover art of Born This Way, which featured the singer fused into a motorcycle. Gaga's name does not appear on the album cover – the only text is the chrome writing across the top reading the album's name. She explained, "The cover with me half-female, half-motorcycle is meant to be or symbolic of the fact that I'm endlessly always changing in so transformative, many ways." The cover was photographed by Nick Knight and created with the Haus of Gaga. Initial reactions received from critics and fans were negative. Sean Michaels of The Guardian expressed that the cover "[looked] more like a cheap Photoshop job than the most anticipated album of the year." He then commented, "Gone are the futurist sunglasses, the asymmetrical haircuts, even Gaga's newly touted magic horns; instead, a mutant motorbike with Gaga's arms and head, plus a cheesy chrome typeface." He also referenced several messages from fans on Gaga's official forum expressing their dislike for the cover. The special edition cover was released on the same day: it features just Gaga's head from the standard edition cover but the words "Lady Gaga" and "Born This Way" appear in the top left corner of the cover. They are typed in Impact font with "Born This Way" being highlighted in white with black letters. Neither of the words special nor deluxe appear anywhere on the album, as Gaga revealed she disliked them.

Born This Way was formally released worldwide on May 23, 2011, by Interscope, KonLive, and Streamline, in two separate editions. On June 7, 2011, it was released as a fan package, including the deluxe version of the CD, LP, and digital download. By August, a collector's edition box set became available with 9 piece 12-inch vinyl picture discs containing all the tracks and a special message from Gaga etched into the vinyl. A mosaic poster was also included. Ultimately, it was released as a limited-edition box out of three hundred, featuring the same products but with black box on the outside and lined with velvet on the inside and the vinyls wrapped in a red plastic. Interscope also released a USB drive version on October 3, 2011, comprising the album's deluxe set, music videos, a photo gallery, and more contents.

=== Singles ===
"Born This Way", the lead single, was released on February 11, 2011. Acknowledged as a "magical message" by Billboard's Jem Aswad, the Gaga and Jeppe Laursen-written song was produced by herself, Laursen, Garibay and DJ White Shadow. It was met with mostly positive reception from critics, who noted the similarities with "Express Yourself". "Born This Way" experienced widespread commercial success, topping the charts in over nineteen countries in addition to selling over a million copies worldwide, becoming the fastest selling song in iTunes history. In her native United States, the song became Gaga's third number one hit, where it spent six weeks atop the Billboard Hot 100. It also became the 1,000th song to reach the number one spot since the inauguration of the chart in 1958. The accompanying music video, directed by Nick Knight, was released on February 28, 2011. In it, Gaga appears with shoulder and facial protrusions and talks about giving birth to an extraterrestrial race that "bears no prejudice, no judgment, but boundless freedom." It was met with generally positive reception among music critics, and was noted by MTV for its references to the work of Madonna, Michael Jackson, Björk, and the late fashion designer Alexander McQueen, as well as to Greek mythology and surrealism.

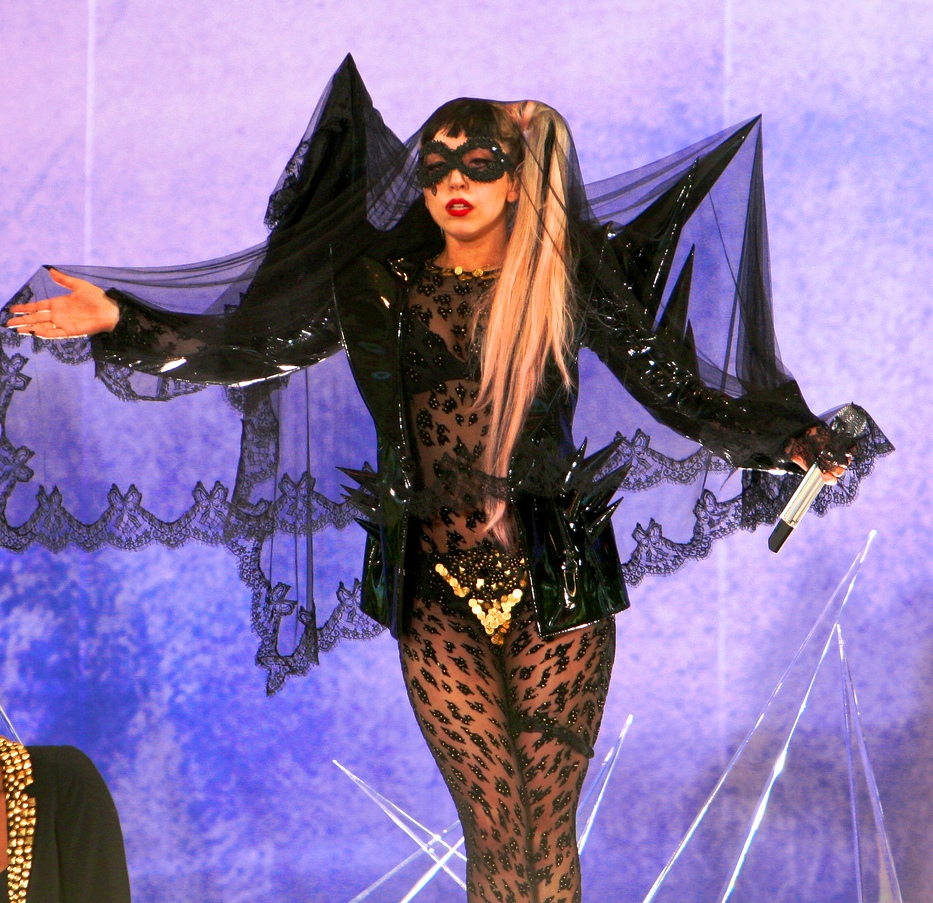
Gaga performing "The Edge of Glory" on Good Morning America in 2011. Initially released as a promotional single, it went on to become the third single off the album due to positive feedback

"Judas" was the album's second single, having been released on April 15, 2011. Critics reacted positively to "Judas", complimenting the song's breakdown, yet noted similarities with "Bad Romance" in its composition. It debuted at number four on the Hot Digital Songs chart with the sale of 162,000 copies while peaking at number ten in the United States, reaching the top ten of twenty countries and peaked at number one on the South Korean charts. The music video for "Judas" was co-directed by Gaga and choreographer Laurieann Gibson, and premiered on May 5, 2011. It includes a motorcycle gang representing the Twelve Apostles, and tells a modernized version of the Biblical story about Judas (portrayed by Norman Reedus) betraying Jesus, in which ends with Gaga as Mary Magdalene getting stoned to death. The video was generally praised by critics, and received two nominations at the 2011 MTV Video Music Awards.

The release of the album was preceded by two promotional singles – "The Edge of Glory" on May 9, and "Hair" on May 16, 2011. "The Edge of Glory" became a success in digital stores, prompting Gaga to make it the third single from Born This Way on May 11, 2011. It was praised by many critics, who deemed it as an album highlight. The song's points of positive reception include the saxophone solo provided by Clemons, the underlying message and Gaga's "throaty" and "soulful" vocals. It reached the top ten of nineteen countries and became Gaga's tenth consecutive top-ten single in the United States, debuting at number three on the Billboard Hot 100. A music video for the song premiered on June 16, 2011, co-directed by the singer and her production team, Haus of Gaga. It portrays Gaga dancing on a fire-escape and walking on a lonely street, with scenes featuring Clemons. This was his final appearance before he died. Critics highlighted the video for its simplicity in contrast to much of Gaga's past work.

"You and I", the album's fourth single, was also met with positive critical reaction that complimented the musical composition of the song. The song became Gaga's eleventh consecutive top ten single in the United States, peaking at number six on the Billboard Hot 100. The single has received a Grammy nomination for Best Pop Solo Performance. The accompanying music video was also positively received. It was shot by Laurieann Gibson in Springfield, Nebraska, and was released on August 16, 2011. It features Yüyi, Gaga's mermaid alter ego, Jo Calderone, Gaga's male alter ego, and Gaga playing on a piano in the middle of a corn field.

"Marry the Night" served as the fifth (and at the time final) single from Born This Way. Critical reception toward the song was positive, with reviewers calling it a strong dance-pop number. It charted in fifteen different countries including the United States, where it peaked at number 29 on the Billboard Hot 100. The accompanying music video received critical acclaim as well, being noted by some critics as a "pure spectacle" and as one of Gaga's "biggest epics". It features scenes in a clinic, a dance studio, Gaga's own New York apartment and on a car's rooftop at a parking lot. "Stuck on Fuckin' You", an outtake from the album, was released as a free YouTube stream on Christmas Day 2011 and thereafter as a free download.

In 2022, "Bloody Mary" went viral after being used in videos on TikTok, depicting Wednesday Addams' dance from the Netflix comedy horror series Wednesday and its fan recreations. This resulted in a large increase in plays on Spotify. In December 2022, it was sent to French and Italian radio as a single, while in January 2023 to US pop radio. The sped-up version of "Bloody Mary" is featured in the teaser trailer for the second season of Wednesday.

=== Live performances ===
The first song from Born This Way performed by Gaga live was "You and I", at the 2010 White Tie & Tiara Ball at Elton John's house, on Today at Rockefeller Center in New York, and during the Monster Ball Tour. In 2011, she embarked on promotional tours and live performances for Born This Way in North America, Europe, Asia, and Australia. It began with a live performance of the album's lead single at the 53rd Annual Grammy Awards. On April 28, Gaga performed "Judas" for the first time on Ellen. "Born This Way" and "You and I" was also sung on Oprah on May 6. After her Grammy performance, in February 2011, Gaga added "Born This Way" to the setlist of the Monster Ball Tour, where she performed it as a second encore, in a very similar outfit and choreography as on the awards show. In May, she finished the Monster Ball Tour with concerts in Mexico, where she premiered "Americano" by performing the song on the piano, and closed it with a performance of "Judas".

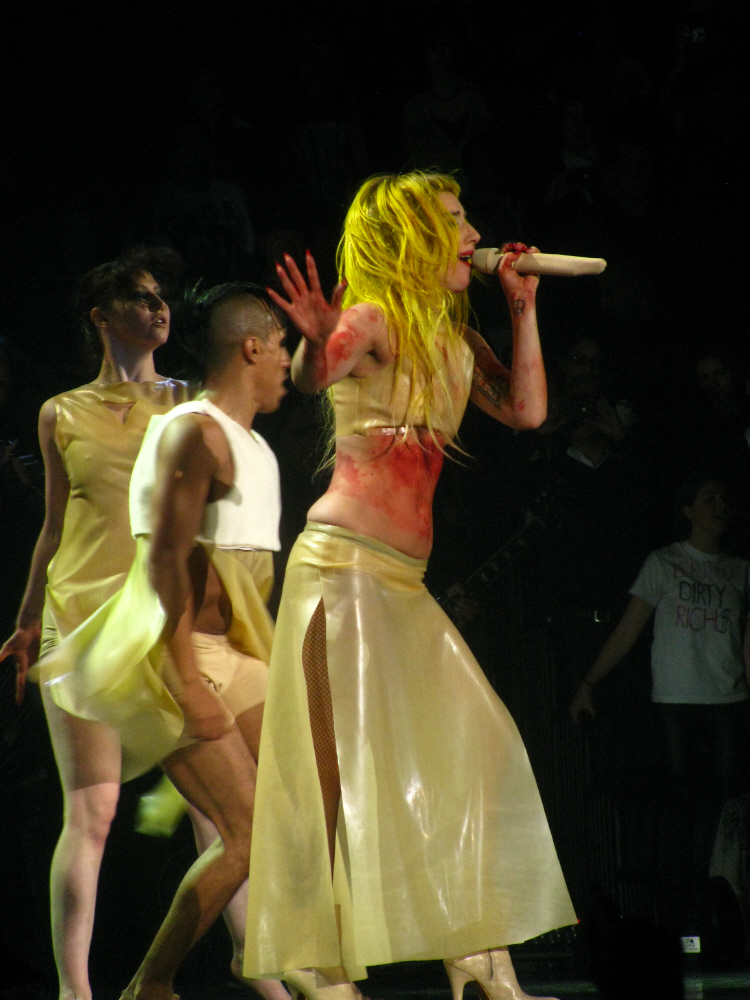
Gaga performing the title track on the Monster Ball Tour. The singer started promoting the album with the 2011 leg of the concert series.

After finishing the tour, Gaga performed on the Robin Hood Gala 2011 in New York on May 9. In Europe, she sang "Judas" at the French show Le Grand Journal (May 12), "Born This Way" and "Judas" on The Graham Norton Show (May 13), and "Born This Way" and "You and I" during the private concert at Annabel's for Belvedere Vodka (May 12). On May 15, she headlined BBC Radio 1's Big Weekend festival, where she sang "The Edge of Glory" for the first time. After returning to the United States, Gaga sang the first three singles from Born This Way on the season 36 finale of Saturday Night Live (May 21) and "The Edge of Glory" on the final show of the tenth season of American Idol (May 25), where she was joined by Clemons in person. On May 27, she held a concert for Good Morning America at Central Park, where she performed the first three singles from Born This Way and, for the first time, "Hair". Another journey to Europe in June included performances on the season 6 finale of Germany's Next Topmodel, British TV show Paul O'Grady Live, the EuroPride 2011 in Rome, as well as some French shows such as Taratata, X Factor, and Le Grand Journal again. More performances of "The Edge of Glory" and "Born This Way" were held during the 2011 MuchMusic Video Awards in Toronto on June 19 and the 2011 MTV Video Music Aid Japan on June 25. Afterwards, Gaga performed on Japanese shows SMAP×SMAP and Music Lovers, before playing concerts in Taichung (July 3), Singapore (July 7), and at the Sydney Town Hall in Sydney (July 13). In the latter, she also performed on TV show A Current Affair on July 11.

Gaga came back to the United States and performed on The Howard Stern Show (July 18), as well as So You Think You Can Dance (July 27), Jimmy Kimmel Live! (July 28), and The View (August 1). On August 28, she sang "You and I" at the 2011 MTV Video Music Awards where she was joined onstage by May, while on September 24, she headlined the 2011 iHeartRadio Music Festival at the MGM Grand Garden Arena in Las Vegas. Another performance came in October on British TV show Friday Night with Jonathan Ross, during the Clinton Foundation concert at the Hollywood Bowl, and on the F1 Rocks after party in India, where "Marry the Night" was sung for the first time. Gaga's next performances were at the 2011 MTV Europe Music Awards held in Belfast, British TV shows The X Factor and Alan Carr: Chatty Man, Children in Need Rocks Manchester telethon in Manchester, and the 2012 Grammy Awards nomination concert in Los Angeles. Songs from the album were also performed on a Thanksgiving television special A Very Gaga Thanksgiving, aired on November 24. Gaga also headlined KIIS-FM Jingle Ball at the Nokia Theatre in Los Angeles on December 3, as well as Z100's Jingle Ball at Madison Square Garden in New York City on December 9. She also sang on Ellen once again and the Japanese show Music Station. The promotions for Born This Way continued with the performance of "Heavy Metal Lover", "Marry the Night" and the title track on the Dick Clark's New Year's Rockin' Eve in Times Square.

=== Tour ===
In April 2012, Gaga embarked on the Born This Way Ball, her worldwide tour promoting the album, which had 98 dates overall. She visited parts of the world she had not been on tour before, including Southeast Asia, Latin America, and South Africa. The singer described the tour as an "electro-metal pop-opera". The stage was modeled after a medieval Gothic castle, featuring viewing towers, intricate carvings and a large catwalk to interact with the audience. During the tour, all of the songs from the album were performed.

The Born This Way Ball was well received by critics who praised the stage design, the costumes, Gaga's vocal abilities, and different expressive messages. It was also a commercial success, grossing $183.9 million overall, although, because of a hip injury, Gaga had to cancel the last North American leg of the tour.

== Critical reception ==
Professional ratings
Aggregate scores
Source	Rating
AnyDecentMusic?	6.5/10
Metacritic	71/100
Review scores
Source	Rating
AllMusic	5/5 stars
Chicago Tribune	2.5/4 stars
Entertainment Weekly	B+
The Guardian	4/5 stars
The Independent	3/5 stars
MSN Music (Expert Witness)	A−
NME	8/10
Rolling Stone	4/5 stars
Spin	8/10

Born This Way received generally positive reviews from contemporary music critics. At Metacritic, which assigns a normalized rating out of 100 to reviews from mainstream critics, the album received an average score of 71, based on 34 reviews. Dan Martin of NME said that "it's a damn good thing" that Gaga "doesn't know when to hold back" and complimented her for pushing musical boundaries to its "ultimate degree." Sal Cinquemani from Slant Magazine opined, "There's nothing small about this album, and Gaga sings the shit out of every single track." Cinquemani compared the album to The Killers' album Sam's Town (2006), calling it "bloated, self-important, proudly American, an exercise in extraordinary excess." Rolling Stone's Rob Sheffield felt that "the more excessive Gaga gets, the more honest she sounds." Caryn Ganz of Spin felt that "excess is Gaga's riskiest musical gamble, but it's also her greatest weapon, and Born This Way relentlessly bludgeons listeners' pleasure centers". Adam Markovitz of Entertainment Weekly said it is "rewarding but wildly uneven", although "the album's sprawl still shows off the breadth of her talent." Despite criticizing her for "letting her skills as a songwriter slide ever so slightly," AllMusic editor Stephen Thomas Erlewine complimented Gaga's composing "sensibility" and "considerable dexterity at delivering the basics." In MSN Music, Robert Christgau viewed the album to not be on-par with The Fame (2008) or The Fame Monster (2009), but added that "both of those keep growing, and with its mad momentum and nutty thematics, this one could too."

In a mixed review, Greg Kot of the Chicago Tribune felt it was rushed and sounded like "a major artist sprinting to please everyone all the time." Evan Sawdey of PopMatters called it "her weakest album to date" and wrote that it combines "some daring songwriting with some remarkably repetitive themes and beats." Writing for The Washington Post, Chris Richards found the album "boring" and said that, "at its worst, it sounds like reheated leftovers from some '80s movie soundtrack." Randall Roberts of the Los Angeles Times opined that Gaga lacks musical adventurousness and that "She's unsubtle in her message, unsubtle in her dress, and, most important, unsubtle aesthetically ... If Gaga had only spent as much time on pushing musical boundaries as she has social ones, Born This Way would have been a lot more successful." Andy Gill of The Independent critiqued that "the broader [Gaga] spreads her net musically, the less distinctive her art becomes." The Boston Globe said that the songwriting "feels thin" and called the album "the most deflated moment in pop music this year". The Village Voice's Rich Juzwiak commented that Gaga's "we-shall-overcome sentiment" is expressed more effectively through the album's "egalitarian use of house beats" than through her "sloganeering", which he found "trite" and "[un]insightful."

== Commercial performance ==
Born This Way debuted at number one on the US Billboard 200 after having sold 1,108,000 copies during the first week, making it the seventeenth album to sell over a million copies in one week. Born This Way was Gaga's first number-one album and the highest first-week total since 50 Cent's The Massacre (2005) sold 1,141,000 in its first week. Gaga was the fifth woman to sell one million copies in a week, after Whitney Houston (The Bodyguard Soundtrack, 1992), Britney Spears (Oops!...I Did It Again, 2000), Norah Jones (Feels Like Home, 2004), and Taylor Swift (Speak Now, 2010). Amazon sold an estimated 440,000 copies in its first two days at a price of 99 cents (at a loss of over $3 million) which contributed to its 662,000 digital sales, the largest in Nielsen SoundScan history. Digital downloads accounted for 60 percent of Born This Way's first week total. The album had been cited as the reason Billboard instituted a policy of only including sales priced over $3.49 during an album's first four weeks. The album also became the eighth best-selling digital album in United States history after its first week of sales. Born This Way also reached number one on the Dance/Electronic Albums chart, displacing The Fame (2008). In its second week, the album sold 174,000 copies to remain at the top spot on the Billboard 200, but with a sales decrease of 84.27%, set the record for the largest second-week percentage sales drop for a number-one debuting album since Nielsen SoundScan began tracking sales in 1991. Digitally, the album had a 94% drop, selling 38,000 copies. In its third week the album fell to number two being displaced by Adele's 21 (2011) with 42% sales decrease after having sold 100,000 copies. Born This Way became the third-best-selling album of the year in the United States, with sales of 2,101,000 copies. It is also the fifth best-selling digital album of all time in the United States, with 877,000 copies sold, as of January 2012. The album received quadruple platinum certification from the Recording Industry Association of America (RIAA) and has sold 2.43 million copies in total in the US as of March 2019. Following Gaga's Super Bowl LI halftime show performance, Born This Way re-entered the Billboard 200 at number 25, selling 17,000 total album-equivalent units. In September 2021, due to the release of the CD and cassette editions of the album's special tenth anniversary reissue, it re-entered the Billboard 200 and Top Album Sales charts at numbers 162 and 10, respectively, selling 5,000 copies—all versions of Born This Way were combined and nearly all of the sum was provided by CD sales.

The album debuted at the top spot in Australia, becoming her second number-one album there after The Fame Monster (2009). Born This Way was certified platinum in Australia in its first week by the Australian Recording Industry Association (ARIA) and has since been certified triple platinum for a shipment of 210,000 copies. Born This Way also debuted at the top spot on the New Zealand Albums Chart, becoming her second album to chart there, after The Fame Monster. The album was certified platinum in its first week of sales. Born This Way sold 184,000 copies in its first week in Japan, and debuted atop the Oricon chart. It had been certified triple platinum by the Recording Industry Association of Japan (RIAJ) for shipment of 750,000 copies. Born This Way was the fourth best-selling album of the year in Japan, with sales of 658,554 copies.

In the United Kingdom, Born This Way debuted at number one on the UK Albums Chart dated May 29, 2011, selling 215,639 units, which was the highest first-week sales of the year. That week, the album outsold the rest of the top 10 combined and had the best first-week tally of any album by an American female solo artist since Madonna's Confessions on a Dance Floor debuted with sales of 217,610 copies in 2005. As of September 2025, Born This Way had been certified quadruple platinum by the British Phonographic Industry (BPI), selling a total of 1.2 million copies in the UK. The album debuted at number one in Ireland, and Sweden, while debuting at number two in Finland where it was the fifth-best-selling album of 2011. In France, Born This Way debuted at number one on the French Albums Chart and held that spot for two weeks. As of June 2023, the album has sold 237,000 copies and has been certified double-platinum by the Syndicat National de l'Édition Phonographique (SNEP).

According to the International Federation of the Phonographic Industry (IFPI), Born This Way was the third global best-selling album of 2011. As of 2021, Born This Way had more than 5.8 billion global streams, 5.2 million physical copies sold, and 31 million digital tracks sold.

== Accolades ==
Born This Way was included in several year-end lists by music critics and publications. Rolling Stone, in their list of the 50 Best Albums of 2011, ranked it at sixth place, writing "none of Gaga's previous exercises in musical plussizing prepared us for this kind of anything-goes extravagance".The Guardian, in their list of the best albums of 2011, listed Born This Way at 31st. Slant Magazine ranked the album as the third best of 2011 in their list of The 25 Best Albums of 2011, calling it a "magnum opus", and describing it as a "sincere ode to the bedazzled hearts of outsiders past and present". Furthermore, MTV ranked it as the tenth best album of 2011, claiming it is the "first multi-national, multi-hyphenate, multi-sexual pop album of our time", and called it "her grandest mission statement to date". Claiming that through the album, Gaga "thinks pop can still move policy, and she might be right", and describing the record as the "biggest pop album" of 2011, Spin listed Born This Way as the 29th best album of the year, as well as the best pop album of the year. Digital Spy included Born This Way in their 25 Best Albums of 2011 list, at fifth place, while the Daily Record ranked it at seventeenth out of twenty, commenting on Gaga having gone "full-scale European underground electro disco".

Aside from critic polls, the album received Grammy Award nominations for the 54th Annual Grammy Awards in 2012, including Album of the Year, Best Pop Album and Best Pop Solo Performance ("You and I"). Being her third consecutive Grammy nomination for Album of the Year, Gaga is the first artist since British rock band The Beatles to receive three consecutive nominations in the category. Additionally, the album was nominated in the category of Favorite Pop/Rock Album at the American Music Awards of 2011, losing to Adele's 21. However, Born This Way beat out 21 at the 38th People's Choice Awards, taking home Favorite Album. At the 2012 Japan Gold Disc Awards, Born This Way won Western Album of the Year and Best 3 Western Albums. In 2012, Rolling Stone called Born This Way the 11th greatest album of all time by a female artist. The same publication later included it in their 2020 update of the 500 Greatest Albums of All Time, on the 484th spot. The album was ranked number 1 on NME's list of The 10 Most Pretentious Albums Ever. Rolling Stone ranked the album at number 82 in its 2025 list of the "250 Greatest Albums of the 21st Century So Far".

== Impact ==
Born This Way's themes of acceptance, sexual orientation, gender identity and intersectional feminism have been of discussion for the 2010s. Nicole Froio from Harper's Bazaar stated that "Born This Way marked a new era of queer music and performance." She argued that the album is "a pop record, but also a manifestation [...] of queer self-discovery," where Gaga explores her life events "through queer lens", opting for a "transcendent rather than static version of the truth". She also marked the album's "musical transgressions" —pop, opera, heavy metal, disco, house, and rock and roll— as "attractive to a queer audience," further explaining that "this kind of pop music is an artistic expression of certain aspects of queerness, a kind of expression that says, 'We can go beyond these tired boundaries we were taught are right'." James Rettig from Stereogum said that Gaga "wanted [her legacy] to be one of acceptance, specifically for the LGBTQ community" and described the album as "a beacon of hope for so many". R.S. from Vulture opined that "with Born This Way, Gaga chose to recast pop as a safe space for vulnerable, misfit, queer kids to find their individuality and reinvent the world in their image."

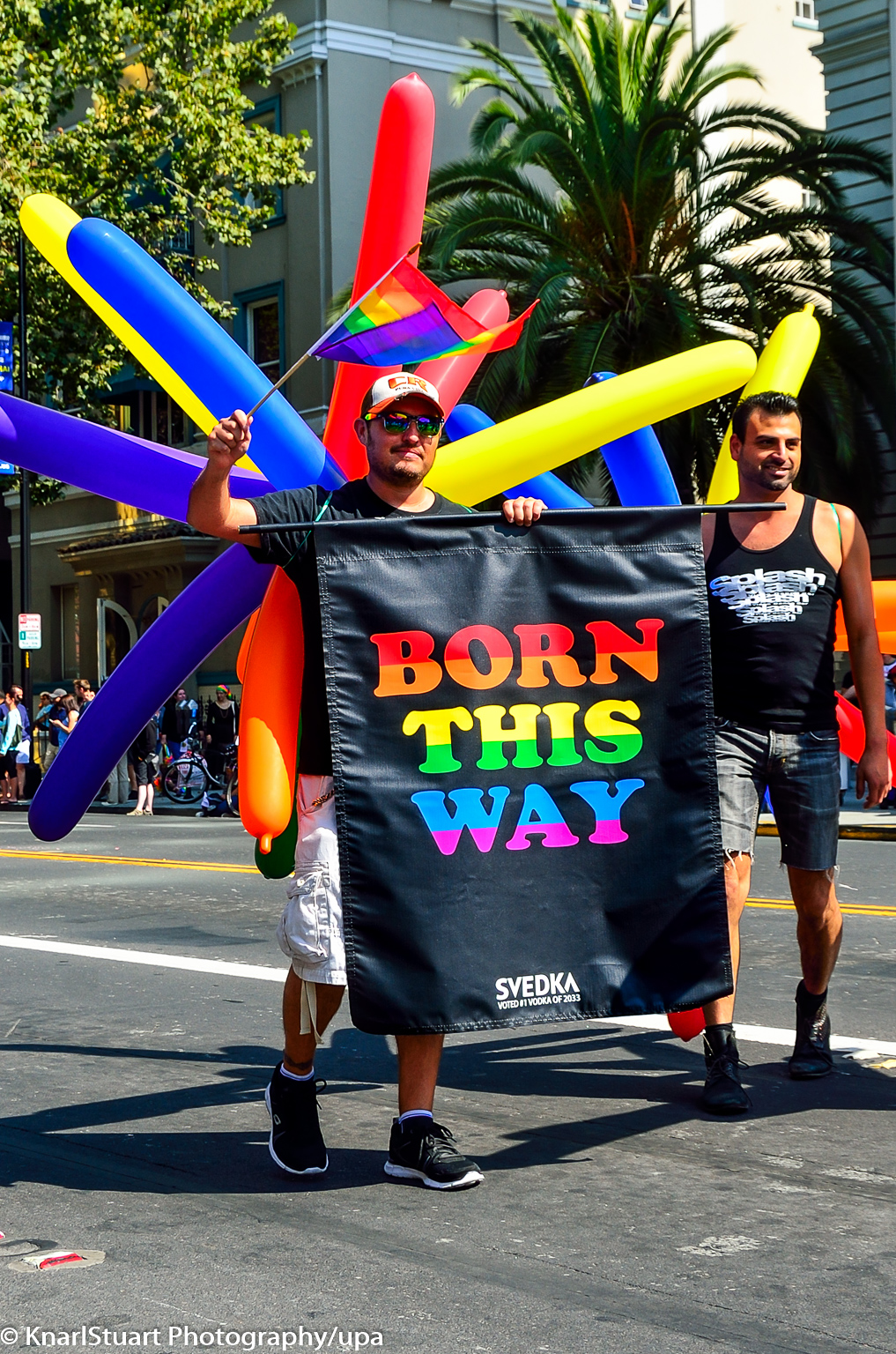
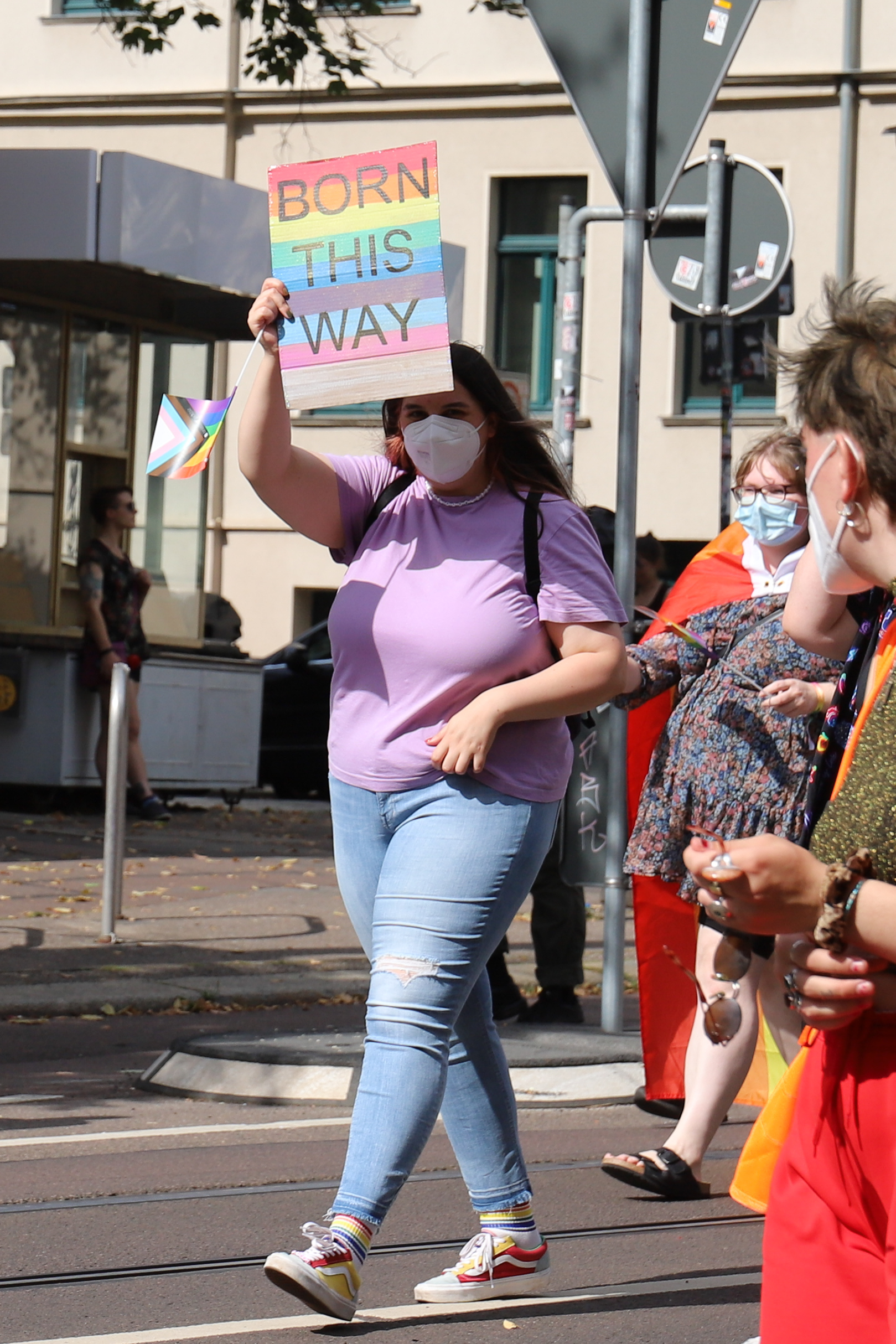
People holding signs written "Born This Way" during pride parades around the world

In an interview with Billboard, Gaga said "I want to write my this-is-who-the-fuck-I-am anthem, but I don't want it to be hidden in poetic wizardry and metaphors," in regards to the literal, straightforward style of the album's lyricism. "I want it to be an attack, an assault on the issue, because I think, especially in today's music, everything gets kind of washy sometimes and the message gets hidden in the lyrical play." Spencer Kornhaber from The Atlantic agreed with Gaga's claims and argued that "queerness became more visible than ever". He described "Barack Obama's first years in office" as a "renewed period of forthright political engagement," while linking the release of Born This Way with the creation of the MTV Video Music Award for Best Video with a Message in 2011, of which "Born This Way" was its first winner. Christopher Rosa from Glamour compared the title track to gay anthems such as Christina Aguilera's "Beautiful" and Katy Perry's "Firework", arguing that "they weren't lyrically explicit" and that anyone could relate to them regardless of sexual orientation or gender identity, unlike "Born This Way", "a song specifically for LGBTQ people [...] that came at a time when discussions about gay teen suicide were reaching all-time highs." Writing a retrospective of events after the album's release after five years, Jake Hall form Dazed called Born This Way a "misunderstood masterpiece", complimenting its "deliberately literal lyrics" in songs such as "Heavy Metal Lover", "Hair" and "Scheiße". Noticing that it "represents the point in Gaga's career when she deliberately stopped studying her own fame and tried to use it to further her own message", he claimed Born This Way as her "most ambitious musical project to date." Marni Zipper from Audacy stated that the album "cemented the singer as a cultural, musical and fashion icon," while also claiming that its campaign, specifically the music video for "Judas", "[distorted] how Popstars ultimately used fashion to express 'eras' in music." Born This Way has also been noted for bringing electronic dance music into the mainstream.

In May 2021, the City of West Hollywood declared May 23 as the Born This Way Day in recognition of the album's cultural impact. A street painting of the album's title and Daniel Quasar's re-designed version of the gay flag (which includes trans and queer people of color) has been made on Robertson Boulevard, while the key of the city was awarded to Gaga. Mayor Lindsey P. Horvath said Gaga "has become a cultural icon for our generation [...] through her music and activism," and also thanked her for "encouraging us to love ourselves and be proud." Gaga attended the ceremony wearing a Born This Way t-shirt from her own collection and thanked the LGBT community for "[being] the motherfucking key to my heart for a long time [...] I'll honor this and I'll cherish this, and I promise that I'll always be here for this day to celebrate with you." In September 2021, during a marketing campaign, Spotify sponsored nine highways across the United States and named them after iconic songs with billboards, in which they included "Highway Unicorn (Road To Love)" in New York City. On December 13, 2022, after Joe Biden, the president of the United States, signed the Respect for Marriage Act into law at the White House, "Born This Way" started playing immediately as planned.

=== Religious controversy ===
Several religious groups have condemned the album for its incorporation of several religious icons of Christianity and its stance on sexuality. In Lebanon, Born This Way was temporarily banned by the General Secretary Department, who deemed the album to be in bad taste and mocking of Christianity. Abdo Abu Kassm, director of the Catholic Information Center of Lebanon, highly criticized the themes of the album, expressing that "if they are going to offend us we are going to cancel the album." He continued, "We will not accept that anyone insult the Virgin Mary or Jesus or Christianity [...]. Call us traditional, call us backward, call us whatever you want. We will not accept it." This ban lasted up until June 9.

The music video of "Judas" was criticized by William Anthony Donohue, the president of the Catholic League, notably for Gaga's portrayal of Mary Magdalene. In an interview with HollywoodLife.com, Donohue expressed discontent toward Gaga's focus on Judas and Mary Magdalene, calling her "increasingly irrelevant" compared to people with "real talent", and attacked her for seemingly purposefully debuting the song and video close to Holy Week and Easter. Shortly after the album's release, "Judas" was banned in Lebanon. In Malaysia, where homosexuality is considered a criminal offense, the government criticized the album for its stance on sexuality and feminism. Shortly after the release of the title track, radio stations across the country edited out several lyrics of the song as ordered by the Malaysian government. Rosnah Ismail, the vice-chancellor of Universiti Malaysia Sabah, condemned the song, opining, "Islam forbids this. We have to abide by the country's laws."

== Follow-up releases ==
=== Remix album and box set ===
A follow-up remix album, titled Born This Way: The Remix, was released on November 18, 2011. Musically, it is an electronic and dance record; there are also influences of Europop, techno and dubstep within the composition. It had a mixed reception, with the general complaint of critics being that the release was unnecessary. The remix album was also issued as part of box set Born This Way: The Collection, released in the same month, which further included a 17-track version of Born This Way, and the DVD Lady Gaga Presents the Monster Ball Tour: At Madison Square Garden.

=== Reissue ===
On May 28, 2021, five days after the album's tenth anniversary, Gaga announced Born This Way The Tenth Anniversary (also referred to as Born This Way Reimagined). She originally announced that the reissue would be released on June 18, however, it was delayed by a week for unknown reasons. The album was officially released on June 25, 2021, through streaming and digital download, while on CD and cassette on September 3, 2021. Its LP version became available on December 10, 2021. The Tenth Anniversary version includes the album's original 14 tracks and an additional disc with six covers by artists representative of the LGBT community. A rendition of "Judas" by American rapper Big Freedia was released as the first single on May 28, 2021. Exclusive merchandise celebrating the album's tenth anniversary was also announced. Three more singles were released prior the album's debut, "Born This Way" (The Country Road Version) by Orville Peck on June 4, "Marry the Night" by Kylie Minogue on June 11, and "The Edge of Glory" by Years & Years on June 22. On June 8, Gaga's beauty brand, Haus Labs, launched the Bad Kid Vault, a limited-edition makeup box set including 16 products.

Writing for Pitchfork, Owen Myers praised the album with a rating of 7.9 out of 10. He called it "an enormous, bravura flex of electronic pop", while stating that "on her best front-to-back album, Gaga belts each crushing hook with every fiber of her chest, with personal pain turned into placard-ready manifestos. She sings like she's making a blood pact." Mike Wass of Variety thought The Tenth Anniversary's bonus disc "sounds a little scattershot", and opined that it was a missed opportunity to include new versions of album tracks "Bad Kids" and "Government Hooker". He added that "where the reissue really succeeds is in reminding us that great pop music challenges the status quo and shines a light on broader issues."

== Track listing ==
Standard edition
No.	Title	Writer(s)	Producer(s)	Length
1.	"Marry the Night"	Lady Gaga; Fernando Garibay	Gaga; Garibay	4:25
2.	"Born This Way"	Gaga; Jeppe Laursen	Gaga; Laursen; Garibay; Paul Blair aka DJ White Shadow	4:20
3.	"Government Hooker"	Gaga; Garibay; Blair	Gaga; Blair; Garibay^{[a]}; DJ Snake^{[a]}	4:14
4.	"Judas"	Gaga; RedOne	Gaga; RedOne	4:09
5.	"Americano"	Gaga; Garibay; Blair; Cheche Alara	Gaga; Garibay; Blair	4:07
6.	"Hair"	Gaga; RedOne	Gaga; RedOne	5:08
7.	"Scheiße"	Gaga; RedOne	Gaga; RedOne	3:46
8.	"Bloody Mary"	Gaga; Garibay; Blair	Gaga; Blair; Garibay^{[a]}; Clinton Sparks^{[a]}	4:05
9.	"Bad Kids"	Gaga; Laursen; Garibay; Blair	Gaga; Laursen; Garibay; Blair	3:51
10.	"Highway Unicorn (Road to Love)"	Gaga; Garibay; Blair	Gaga; RedOne; Garibay; Blair	4:16
11.	"Heavy Metal Lover"	Gaga; Garibay	Gaga; Garibay	4:13
12.	"Electric Chapel"	Gaga; Blair	Gaga; Blair	4:12
13.	"You and I"	Gaga	Gaga; Robert John "Mutt" Lange	5:07
14.	"The Edge of Glory"	Gaga; Garibay; Blair	Gaga; Garibay	5:21
Total length:				61:07

Special edition
No.	Title	Writer(s)	Producer(s)	Length
9.	"Black Jesus + Amen Fashion"	Gaga; Blair	Gaga; Blair	3:36
11.	"Fashion of His Love"	Gaga; Garibay	Gaga; Garibay	3:39
15.	"The Queen"	Gaga; Garibay	Gaga; Garibay	5:17
Total length:				73:38

Special edition disc two
No.	Title	Writer(s)	Producer(s)	Length
1.	"Born This Way" (The Country Road Version)	Gaga; Laursen	Gaga; Garibay	4:22
2.	"Judas" (DJ White Shadow Remix)	Gaga; RedOne	Gaga; RedOne; Blair	4:08
3.	"Marry the Night" (Zedd Remix)	Gaga; Garibay	Gaga; Garibay; Zedd	4:21
4.	"Scheiße" (DJ White Shadow Mugler)	Gaga; RedOne	Gaga; RedOne; Blair	9:35
5.	"Fashion of His Love" (Fernando Garibay Remix)	Gaga; Garibay	Gaga; Garibay	3:45
Total length:				26:07

Tenth Anniversary edition disc two
No.	Title	Writer(s)	Producer(s)	Length
1.	"Marry the Night" (by Kylie Minogue)	Gaga; Garibay	Biff Stannard; Duck Blackwell	4:39
2.	"Judas" (by Big Freedia)	Gaga; RedOne	Gold Glove; Boyfriend	4:07
3.	"Highway Unicorn (Road to Love)" (by The Highwomen featuring Brittney Spencer and Madeline Edwards)	Gaga; Garibay; Blair	Lawrence Rothman	3:35
4.	"You and I" (by Ben Platt)	Gaga	Michael Pollack; Gian Stone	4:42
5.	"The Edge of Glory" (by Years & Years)	Gaga; Garibay; Blair	Mark Ralph	3:59
6.	"Born This Way" (The Country Road Version) (by Orville Peck)	Gaga; Laursen; Garibay; Blair	Orville Peck; Christopher Stracey	4:18
Total length:				25:20

=== Notes ===
- ^{^[a]} signifies a co-producer
- "You and I" contains elements from "We Will Rock You" recorded by Queen and written by Brian May.
- Special edition bonus tracks are inserted into the existing track sequence, advancing all subsequent entries by one position without omitting any original songs.
- International edition includes the Jost & Naaf Remix of "Born This Way".
- Japanese edition includes the LLG vs. GLG Radio Mix of "Born This Way".
- Indian edition includes the Bollywood Remix and UK Desi Remix of "Born This Way".
- USB edition includes six remix tracks of "Born This Way", "Judas" "The Edge of Glory" and "Government Hooker", along with the music videos for the album’s first three singles and four episodes of Gagavision (Episodes 41–44).
- Tenth Anniversary edition disc one CD and digital version contains the 14-track version of the album, whereas LP versions contain the 17 track version.

== Personnel ==
Credits adapted from the liner notes of Born This Way.

Musicians

- Lady Gaga – lead vocals (all tracks), background vocals (1, 3–5 8, 10–13, 16, 17); keyboards (2, 9, 10, 15, 17); instrumentation, arranger (2)
- Fernando Garibay – background vocals, guitar (5); keyboards (1–3, 5, 8, 10–13, 15, 17); instrumentation, arranger (2, 5);
- Paul Blair aka DJ White Shadow – keyboards (3, 8–10, 14); guitar (3)
- RedOne – background vocals (4, 6); instrumentation (4, 6, 7)
- DJ Snake – keyboards, drums, bass (3)
- Robert John "Mutt" Lange – background vocals (1, 6)
- Clarence Clemons – saxophone (5, 17)
- Brian May – guitar (16)
- Kareem "Jesus" Devlin – guitar (3, 14, 15, 17)
- Brian Lee – background vocals (3)
- Peter Van Der Veen – background vocals (3)
- Cheche Alara – instrumentation, arranger (5)
- Mario Hernandez – guitarron, vihuela (5)
- Andy Abad – requinto (5)
- Suemy Gonzales – violin (5)
- Julio Hernandez – violin (5)
- Harry Kim – trumpet (5)
- Jorge Alavrez – background vocals (5)
- David Gomez – background vocals (5)
- Carlos Murguía – background vocals (5)
- Trevor Muzzy – guitar (6)
- Clinton Sparks – keyboards (8)
- Brian Gaynor – bass, keyboards (9, 14); drums, guitar, percussion (9)

Production

- Lady Gaga – songwriting, production, musical direction (all tracks)
- Fernando Garibay – songwriting (1, 3, 5, 8, 10–13, 15, 17); production (1, 2, 5, 8, 10, 11–13, 15, 17); co-production (3, 8); programming (1–3, 5, 8, 10–13, 15, 17); engineer (3, 12); musical direction (all tracks)
- Paul Balir aka DJ White Shadow – songwriting (3, 5, 8–10, 12, 14, 17); production, programming (2, 3, 5, 8–10, 12, 14); drum programming (1, 17)
- RedOne – songwriting, production (4, 6, 7, 12); programming, engineer, vocal editing, vocal arrangement (4, 6, 7)
- Jeppe Laursen – songwriting, production (2, 10)
- Robert John "Mutt" Lange – production (16)
- DJ Snake – co-production (3)
- Cheche Alara – songwriting (5)
- Dave Russell – engineer (1, 2, 4, 5, 8–15, 17); mixing (1–3, 5, 8–15, 17)
- Eric Morris – assistant (1, 12)
- Paul Pavao – assistant (1, 3, 5, 8–13, 15)
- Gene Grimaldi – mastering (all tracks)
- Peter Hutchings – assistant (2)
- Kenta Yonesaka – assistant (2, 17)
- Bill Malina – engineer (3)
- Trevor Muzzy – engineer, mixing, vocal editing (4, 6, 7)
- Christina Abaroa – copyist, librarian, music preparation (5)
- Rafa Sardina – engineer, mixing (5)
- Clinton Sparks – co-production (8)
- Kamau Georges – programming (8)
- Jordan Power – assistant (8)
- Brian Gaynor – programming (9)
- Anna Webster – assistant (10, 11)
- Phillip Knight – assistant (14)
- George Tandero – assistant (15, 17)
- Ken Knapstad – assistant (15, 17)
- Kevin Porter – assistant (17)
- Al Carlson – assistant (17)
- Olle Romo – engineer, programming (16)
- Horace Ward – engineer (16)
- Tom Ware – engineer (16)
- Justin Shirley-Smith – guitar engineer (16)

Managerial

- Vincent Herbert – A&R, executive producer
- Troy Carter – management
- Wendi Morris – management
- Bobby Campbell – marketing
- Dyana Kass – marketing
- Jurgen Grebner – International promotion
- Tomoko Itoki – International promotion
- Brett Bracy – International promotion
- Amanda Silverman – publicity
- Erika Savage – business affair
- Kenneth R. Meiselas – legal
- Jennifer Paola – A&R

Visuals and design

- Nicola Formichetti – creation, fashion direction
- Nick Knight – creation, photography
- Laurieann Gibson – creation
- Todd Tourso – creation
- Gretchen Anderson – art production
- Lisa Einhorn-Gilder – production coordination
- Anna Trevelyan – stylist
- Brandon Maxwell – stylist
- Sam McKnight – hair stylist
- Val Garland – make-up
- Marian Newman – nails

== Charts ==
=== Weekly charts ===
Weekly chart performance
Chart (2011–2022)	Peak position
Argentina Albums (CAPIF)	1
Australian Albums (ARIA)	1
Austrian Albums (Ö3 Austria)	1
Belgian Albums (Ultratop Flanders)	1
Belgian Albums (Ultratop Wallonia)	1
Brazilian Albums (ABPD)	2
Canadian Albums (Billboard)	1
Croatian Albums (HDU)	1
Czech Albums (ČNS IFPI)	1
Danish Albums (Hitlisten)	1
Dutch Albums (Album Top 100)	5
Estonian Albums (Eesti Ekspress)	2
Finnish Albums (Suomen virallinen lista)	2
French Albums (SNEP)	1
German Albums (Offizielle Top 100)	1
Greek Albums (IFPI)	1
Hungarian Albums (MAHASZ)	1
Irish Albums (IRMA)	1
Italian Albums (FIMI)	1
Japanese Albums (Oricon)	1
Lithuanian Albums (AGATA)	29
Mexican Albums (Top 100 Mexico)	1
New Zealand Albums (RMNZ)	1
Norwegian Albums (VG-lista)	1
Polish Albums (ZPAV)	3
Portuguese Albums (AFP)	1
Russian Albums (2M)	1
Scottish Albums (Official Charts)	1
Slovenian Albums (IFPI)	1
South African Albums (RiSA)	4
South Korean Albums (Circle)	24
South Korean International Albums (Circle)	4
Spanish Albums (Promusicae)	2
Swedish Albums (Sverigetopplistan)	1
Swiss Albums (Schweizer Hitparade)	1
Taiwan International Albums (G-Music)	1
UK Albums (Official Charts)	1
Uruguayan Albums (CUD)	1
US Billboard 200	1
US Top Dance Albums (Billboard)	1

Weekly chart performance
Chart (2025)	Peak position
German Pop Albums (Offizielle Top 100)	18

=== Year-end charts ===
Year-end chart performance
Chart (2011)	Position
Australian Albums (ARIA)	6
Australian Dance Albums (ARIA)	2
Austrian Albums (Ö3 Austria)	15
Belgian Albums (Ultratop 50 Flanders)	23
Belgian Albums (Ultratop 50 Wallonia)	13
Brazilian Albums (ABPD)	13
Canadian Albums (Billboard)	3
Danish Albums (Hitlisten)	38
Dutch Albums (Album Top 100)	40
Finnish Albums (Suomen virallinen lista)	23
French Albums (SNEP)	18
German Albums (Offizielle Top 100)	17
Hungarian Albums (MAHASZ)	30
Irish Albums (IRMA)	17
Italian Albums (FIMI)	21
Japanese Albums (Oricon)	4
Mexican Albums (Top 100 Mexico)	13
New Zealand Albums (RMNZ)	7
Polish Albums (ZPAV)	33
Russian Albums (2M)	6
South Korean International Albums (Circle)	28
Spanish Albums (PROMUSICAE)	23
Swedish Albums (Sverigetopplistan)	14
Swiss Albums (Schweizer Hitparade)	10
UK Albums (Official Charts)	7
US Billboard 200	3
US Top Dance/Electronic Albums (Billboard)	1
Worldwide Albums (IFPI)	3

Year-end chart performance
Chart (2012)	Position
Australian Dance Albums (ARIA)	16
French Albums (SNEP)	173
Japanese Albums (Oricon)	68
South Korean International Albums (Circle)	86
UK Albums (Official Charts)	90
US Billboard 200	85
US Top Dance/Electronic Albums (Billboard)	4

Year-end chart performance
Chart (2017)	Position
US Top Dance/Electronic Albums (Billboard)	12

Year-end chart performance
Chart (2020)	Position
US Top Dance/Electronic Albums (Billboard)	21

Year-end chart performance
Chart (2021)	Position
US Top Dance/Electronic Albums (Billboard)	12

Year-end chart performance
Chart (2022)	Position
US Top Dance/Electronic Albums (Billboard)	9

Year-end chart performance
Chart (2023)	Position
US Top Dance/Electronic Albums (Billboard)	4

Year-end chart performance
Chart (2024)	Position
Australian Dance Albums (ARIA)	10
US Top Dance/Electronic Albums (Billboard)	8

Year-end chart performance
Chart (2025)	Position
US Top Dance Albums (Billboard)	7

=== Decade-end charts ===
Decade-end chart performance
Chart (2010–2019)	Position
Australian Albums (ARIA)	59
UK Albums (Official Charts)	45
US Billboard 200	138
US Dance/Electronic Albums (Billboard)	9

== Certifications and sales ==
Certifications and sales
Region	Certification	Certified units/sales
Australia (ARIA)	3× Platinum	210,000^{‡}
Austria (IFPI Austria)	Platinum	20,000^{*}
Belgium (BRMA)	Platinum	30,000^{*}
Brazil (Pro-Música Brasil)	2× Platinum	80,000^{*}
Canada (Music Canada)	6× Platinum	480,000^{‡}
Chile	2× Platinum	
Colombia	—	15,000
Denmark (IFPI Danmark)	Platinum	20,000^{‡}
Finland (Musiikkituottajat)	Gold	19,338
France (SNEP)	2× Platinum	237,000
GCC (IFPI Middle East)	Platinum	6,000^{*}
Germany (BVMI)	3× Gold	300,000^{‡}
Hungary (MAHASZ)	Gold	3,000^{^}
India	Gold	
Ireland (IRMA)	2× Platinum	30,000^{^}
Italy (FIMI)	2× Platinum	100,000^{‡}
Japan (RIAJ)	3× Platinum	750,000^{^}
Mexico (AMPROFON)	Platinum	60,000^{^}
New Zealand (RMNZ)	2× Platinum	30,000^{‡}
Norway (IFPI Norway)	Platinum	20,000^{‡}
Philippines	Gold	11,000
Poland (ZPAV)	Platinum	20,000^{*}
Portugal (AFP)	Gold	3,500^{‡}
Russia (NFPF)	4× Platinum	40,000^{*}
Singapore (RIAS)	Gold	5,000^{*}
South Korea (Gaon) (Note: Album sales from 2011)	—	8,802
Spain (Promusicae)	Gold	30,000^{^}
Sweden (GLF)	Platinum	40,000^{‡}
Switzerland (IFPI Switzerland)	Platinum	30,000^{^}
Taiwan	—	100,000
United Kingdom (BPI)	4× Platinum	1,200,000^{‡}
United States (RIAA)	4× Platinum	4,000,000^{‡}
Summaries
Asia	—	1,300,000
Europe (IFPI)	Platinum	1,000,000^{*}
Worldwide	—	6,000,000
^{*} Sales figures based on certification alone.^{^} Shipments figures based on certification alone.^{‡} Sales+streaming figures based on certification alone.

Born This Way The Tenth Anniversary
Region	Certification	Certified units/sales
Brazil (Pro-Música Brasil)	Diamond	160,000^{‡}
^{‡} Sales+streaming figures based on certification alone.
