= Judas (Lady Gaga song) =

2011 single by Lady Gaga

Single by Lady Gaga

from the album Born This Way
- B-side: "Born This Way" (Twin Shadow remix)
- Released: April 15, 2011
- Recorded: 2010
- Studio: Gang (Paris)
- Genre: Electro house
- Length: 4:09
- Label: Streamline; Kon Live; Interscope
- Songwriters: Lady Gaga; RedOne
- Producers: Lady Gaga; RedOne

Lady Gaga singles chronology
"Born This Way" (2011)	"Judas" (2011)	"The Edge of Glory" (2011)

Music video
- "Judas" on YouTube

"Judas" is a song by American singer Lady Gaga, recorded for her second studio album, Born This Way (2011). It was released by Interscope Records on April 15, 2011, as the second single from the album. Written and produced by Lady Gaga and RedOne, it is an electro house song about a woman in love with a man who betrayed her. It embodies the incidents that have haunted Gaga in the past, and its core meaning refers to the negative parts of her life that she cannot escape. Gaga has further explained that the song was also about honoring one's inner darkness in order to bring oneself into the light. The artwork for the single was designed by Gaga in Microsoft Word. In spite of a polarizing impact on several religious groups, the song was generally well received by critics, who likened the song to "Bad Romance" with some noting it should have been the album's lead single.

The song has a similar sound to Gaga's previous RedOne-produced tracks, including "Poker Face", "LoveGame", "Bad Romance", and "Alejandro". It contains three distinct hooks and a house-influenced break down. Gaga explained that the lines spoken during the breakdown talk about her as beyond redemption, regarding the traditional views of what a woman should be. Commercially, "Judas" reached the top ten in Australia, Austria, Belgium, Canada, the Czech Republic, Denmark, Finland, France, Hungary, Ireland, Israel, Italy, Japan, Luxembourg, the Netherlands, Norway, Portugal, South Korea, Spain, Sweden, Switzerland, the United Kingdom, and the United States. Years later, its resurgence on TikTok propelled it to number 73 on the Billboard Global 200 and helped it surpass one billion streams on Spotify, becoming the most-streamed song from Born This Way. It received a diamond certification in Brazil, multi-platinum certifications in Australia and the United States, and platinum certifications in Greece, New Zealand, Sweden, and the United Kingdom.

A music video for the song was filmed in April 2011, co-directed by Gaga and Laurieann Gibson and co-starring Norman Reedus and Rick Gonzalez. It has a Biblical storyline where Gonzalez played a Jesus-like character, Reedus played Judas Iscariot and Gaga played Mary Magdalene. The video portrays them as modern day missionaries going to Jerusalem. It included the Biblical story of Judas betraying Jesus, and ended with Gaga as Magdalene getting stoned to death. Before its release, the Catholic League condemned Gaga for the use of religious imagery and her role in the video. However, the video was generally praised by critics and nominated for two awards at the 2011 MTV Video Music Awards. Gaga has performed "Judas" on a number of television shows, including The Graham Norton Show, Saturday Night Live, The Ellen DeGeneres Show, Good Morning America's "Summer Concert Series", and many of her concert tours and other performances.

== Background ==
"Judas" was revealed as the name of the second single in Gaga's interview for Vogue. Gaga confirmed the release of "Judas" as the second single, on Ryan Seacrest's radio show on February 14, 2011, and also revealed RedOne as the co-producer of the song. At the 53rd Grammy Awards, RedOne told MTV News that if the previous single, the title track from Born This Way, polarized people, "Judas" was expected to shock them more. On the talk show Last Call with Carson Daly, Gaga explained to the host that "Judas" was about always falling in love with the wrong man over and over again. "'Judas' is a very, very dark song. It's rad", she added. With MSN Canada, Gaga revealed the metaphors and the meaning behind the song:

'Judas' is a metaphor and an analogy about forgiveness and betrayal and things that haunt you in your life and how I believe that it's the darkness in your life that ultimately shines and illuminates the greater light that you have upon you. Someone once said to me, 'If you have no shadows then you're not standing in the light.' So the song is about washing the feet of both good and evil and understanding and forgiving the demons from your past in order to move into the greatness of your future. I just like really aggressive metaphors—harder, thicker, darker—and my fans do as well. So it is a very challenging and aggressive metaphor, but it is a metaphor.

Gaga further elaborated on the inspiration behind the song as walking towards the light force in her life and peering towards the devil in the back, while clutching onto the source of the light. "I sing about what a holy fool I am, and that although moments in my life are so cruel and relationships can be so cruel I'm still in love with Judas. I still go back again to those evil things," she said. During her interview with Google, Gaga added to the song's meaning as honoring one's inner darkness in order to bring themselves into the light. One has to learn to forgive themselves in order to move on with their life. With Popjustice she clarified that she has a lot of things that have haunted her from her past, including her choices, men, drug abuse, being afraid to go back to New York, confronting old romances. Hence "Judas" represented something that was not good for her, something she could not escape. Gaga said: "I keep going back and forth between the darkness and the light in order to understand who I am."

== Composition ==
Garibay said that "Judas" sounded similar to many of Gaga's previous singles, like "Poker Face", "LoveGame", "Bad Romance", and "Alejandro". According to Jocelyn Vena of MTV, "Judas" finds Gaga in a similar territory music-wise but vocally she is in completely new territory; according to Popjustice, in the verses and pre-chorus, Gaga hurls herself into a decadent half-sung, half-rapped Jamaican Patois style." Jason Gregory of Gigwise called the song a "heavy slice of electro-house of the highest order". The song contains three hooks, and begins with Gaga singing the line "Oh-oh-oh-oh-oh, I'm in love with Judas", accompanied by building synths. This is followed by a thumping electronic beat, as Gaga sings, "Judas/ Juda-a-ah/ Gaga". The utterance of these words are reminiscent of the opening verse in "Bad Romance". Gaga's vocals are partially spoken, and at times have a Caribbean accent. The first verse follows as: "When he comes to me I am ready/ I'll wash his feet with my hair if he needs/ Forgive him when his tongue lies through his brain/ Even after three times, he betrays me/ I'll bring him down, a king with no crown." The tone lightens up on the song's chorus, which is influenced by '80s pop in its melody, as the beat picks up a bit and Gaga sings, "I'm just a holy fool/ Oh, baby, it's so cruel/ But I'm still in love with Judas, baby."

"Judas"
A 25-second sample of "Judas", where Gaga sings the chorus, which is followed by the tribal-techno influenced break down.

After the second verse and chorus, the song features a break down influenced by house music. Gaga chants the lines in the same way she does in the middle of "Born This Way". Then she sings, "I wanna love you/ But something's pulling me away from you/ Jesus is my virtue, Judas is the demon I cling to, I cling to." In this section, Gaga's vocals drew comparison to that of Rihanna's by Matthew Perpetua of Rolling Stone. He also added that her voice sounded less dark and dramatic and was full of "bubbly sweetness". Popjustice wrote that the breakdown sounded like tribal-techno, and the whole song was "a turbo-charged electrogothic wrongness anthem". Dan Martin from NME wrote that the breakdown was in the dubstep genre with the chorus being "pure-pop". There were some similarities and influences of "Bad Romance" in the song, which Gaga said was deliberate. She explained that while sometimes it is important for her to push herself in new directions, she did want her characteristic sound to be imbibed in her records. "I wanted ['Judas'] to be an evolution from where I've been before but in terms of the formula I wanted there to be something about 'Judas' that reminded people of what I've done in the past," she added. According to the sheet music published on Musicnotes.com, the song is written in the time signature of common time, and is composed in the key of C minor with a tempo of 131 beats per minute. Gaga's voice ranges from the tonal nodes of B♭_{3} to E♭_{5} and the song follows a basic sequence of A♭–Fm_{7}–Cm–B♭–Cm as its chord progression.

Gaga had posted some of the lyrics of the song in February 2011, and next month she revealed more lyrics for "Judas" in the Google interview. Gaga also confirmed that the song was influenced by the Biblical Judas Iscariot. According to Popjustice, lyrically on the surface "Judas" is a song about being double-crossed and contemplating revenge, but being repeatedly drawn to awfulness. The middle eight of the song, with the lyrics "But in the cultural sense I just speak in future tense. Judas kiss me if offenced, or wear an ear condom next time", talks about Gaga being beyond the ability to redeem herself, in terms of the traditional views of what a woman is supposed to be. "But I don't want to redeem myself, because in the cultural sense I believe that I'm just before my time. And if you don't like it, wear an ear condom," she explained. The main portion of the song is about Gaga in private and the middle eight is about Gaga in public, two themes that are explored elsewhere on the parent album too.

== Artwork and release ==
In the 42nd episode of Gaga's web video series, called Transmission Gagavision, it was revealed that the single's accompanying cover artwork was designed by Gaga in Microsoft Word and featured a black background with the word "Judas" written in red capital letters in Impact font. Below it was a red Christian cross with a heart in the middle. Gaga photographed the design on her computer screen using her cellphone "for texture," which resulted in visible pixels on the letters and cross, as well as a faint reflection of her face and hands holding the phone, to appear on the cover. The episode showed Gaga sitting in a meeting with her creative team Haus of Gaga, discussing the specifics of her album release. Scattered around Gaga were a number of photographs, which were speculated by MTV as something "Judas"-related. On one photo the word "Judas" was printed with a cross on it. Jocelyn Vena from MTV felt that the artwork could have easily appeared in director Baz Luhrmann's version of Romeo + Juliet (1996).

On the 41st episode of Transmission Gagavision, Gaga announced that the song was going to be released soon. She added the abstract message along with the announcement: "Let the cultural baptism begin. If they were not who you were taught they would be, would you still believe?" "Judas" was scheduled to be sent to mainstream airplay on April 19, 2011, and digital retailers on the same day, but after the track was leaked to the internet, its release was brought forward to April 15, 2011. This was done to counteract the pre-release leaks. Before the release, Gaga tweeted about the single, saying: "#PawsUpForJudas! I've learned love is like a brick, you can build a house or sink a dead body." On April 15, 2011, hours before the song was played on radio she again tweeted: "Even After Three Times He Betrays Me," she wrote, harking back to the song's lyrics about love and betrayal. In the United Kingdom, the song premiered on The Capital FM Network on April 15, 2011, during their program Home Run. Gaga addressed the leak in the 43rd episode of Transmission Gagavision, likening it to a disembodiment, saying, "A slow death! Just put me out of my f---ing misery, just put that sh-- out. They were tearing [the song] limb for limb. First it was the arm of the song, then the liver...."

On May 28, 2021, a bounce cover by American rapper Big Freedia was released as the first single of the tenth anniversary edition of Born This Way. Billboard ranked it as the best cover on the album, stating "her arrangement matches the original's manic energy with a totally different sonic palette: squawking horns, 808s, marching snares, and stacks of cheerleader backing vocalists."

== Critical reception ==
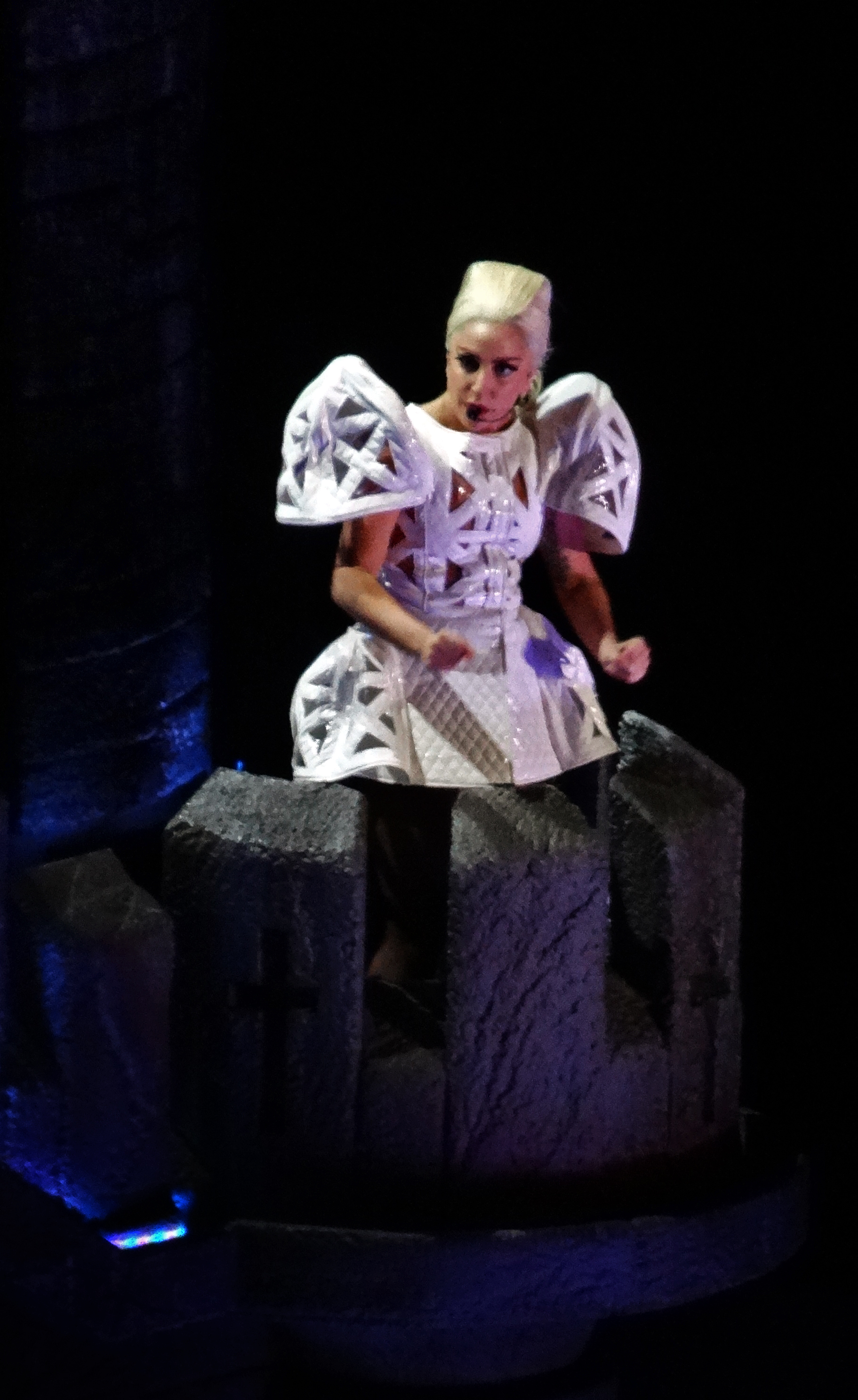
Lady Gaga performing "Judas" on the Born This Way Ball tour, standing on top of the medieval castle prop (2012)

"Judas" was generally well received by most music critics. Jonathan Van Meter from Vogue gave the song a positive review, saying the song sounded like it was written for The Ronettes, but was set to a "sledgehammering" dance beat. MTV's James Dinh noted that the song was very similar in its composition to "Bad Romance". Popjustice also compared it to "Bad Romance" describing it as "a highly evolved, Titanium-plated 'Bad Romance' from the year 2511 travelling half a millennium back in time to save music from a tidal wave of 'in the club'-obsessed pop drivel, and that's 'Judas'." Kevin O'Donnel from Spin felt that the song sounded like a rowdy, industrial-disco banger, and described Gaga's performance as "insanely over the top: She alternates between rapping, a robotic monotone, and a crow-like squawk — before gliding into a more conventional chorus that hews closer to 'Bad Romance'." He complimented the primal energy of the music of "Judas," and felt that the breakdown was one of the weirdest moments to hit the pop music scene in 2011. Slant Magazine's Eric Henderson noted that the disconnection and deviation from Gaga's previous single "Born This Way" was more pronounced with "Judas". Musically he felt that "Judas" had the same "glitter-jackhammer level as 'Born This Way', though the big anthemic chords are almost inverted—not unlike Inner City's Big Fun vs. Good Life. It's a good twin, evil twin thing." Henderson continued that the song conjured the imagery of a disturbed vision of hell, and in a warped sense the song seemed more forward-thinking to him and less of a message, "than the 'gay = great' equation at the heart of 'Born This Way'."

Amos Barshad of Vulture declared that the song reminded him of being drunk and dancing in a remote discothèque in Berlin. NME's Dan Martin was of the opinion that "Judas" was the song that Gaga should have come back with. But he understood why she did not choose it as the lead single from Born This Way, given the fact that the song was characteristic of Gaga's music. Pointing the same thing, Matthew Perpetua from Rolling Stone wrote that the song played to Gaga's established musical sensibilities. He added that although "Judas" certainly had its own charms and "at least three insanely catchy hooks it leans hard on Gaga's signature moves." Maura Johnston of The Village Voice summarized the song as a twin of "Bad Romance" describing its "instantly memorable wordless vocalizing, a pummeling beat, lyrics about a romance that is, well, bad." Digital Spy's Robert Copsey gave the song five out of five stars, commending the "blasphemously camp" chorus and comparing it to be worthy of Eurovision – "a Scooch-meets-Lordi affair that, unsurprisingly, takes a few listens to get your head around." Mark Lepage from The Gazette praised the song and understood that as Gaga's music has progressed, so has her themes and inspirations, indicated by the conflicted relationship she has with the character Judas in the song. Rick Fulton, while writing in the Daily Record, compared it to "'Like a Prayer' on steroids" and gave it three out of five points. NME called the song "Gaga's worst single so far" in November 2011.

=== Plagiarism allegations ===
On August 4, 2011, Rebecca Francescatti, a Chicago-based songwriter, filed a lawsuit against Gaga and Interscope for allegedly ripping off the song "Juda" from her album, It's All About You. According to NBC Chicago, the bassist that worked on the song with Gaga, Brian Gaynor, also plays for Francescatti. A copy of the lawsuit revealed Francescatti seeks a cut from the profits "Judas" has earned, on a song that "copied and incorporated substantial, original portions" of the work.

In June 2014, the lawsuit was dismissed without trial by a Federal Judge in an act of Summary Judgment in Chicago, stating, in part, "The differences [between the songs "Juda" and "Judas"] so outweigh the purported similarities between the melodies that they cannot be said to be even remotely similar", "We agree with Defendants that the songs do not have common lyrics, the themes are different, and they do not sound at all alike musically," and "Thus, we find the similarity of expression to be, quite clearly, 'totally lacking'. The (two songs) are so utterly dissimilar that reasonable minds could not differ as to a lack of substantial similarity between them."

== Chart performance ==
After its release to the digital outlets and radio, Billboard theorized that "Judas" would need to sell between 350,000 and 400,000 copies in two and a half days, and make a large number of radio listener impressions through the end of the airplay tracking period on April 19, 2011, in order to debut at number one on the US Billboard Hot 100 chart. The song debuted at number 30 on the Billboard Pop Songs chart with 1,405 detections on 118 of the Pop Songs panel's 132 reporting stations, translating to an opening audience of 13.6 million. For the issue dated April 30, 2011, "Judas" debuted at number four on Hot Digital Songs chart with 162,000 copies sold. It debuted at its peak position of number ten on the Hot 100—Gaga's third debut in the top 10—and started at number 48 on the Radio Songs chart with 26 million audience. The next week "Judas" dropped two places on the Hot 100, while selling 156,000 downloads (down 4%) in its first full week at retail. However, on Radio Songs, "Judas" jumped from number 48 to number 36 (34 million impressions, up 29%), while also moving up to number 19 on the Pop Songs chart, reaching a peak of number 15 to date. "Judas" also debuted on the Hot Dance Club Songs Chart at number 38, and on Adult Pop Songs at number 40, for the issue dated May 14, 2011. It has since reached the top of the Hot Dance Club Songs chart. According to Nielsen SoundScan, "Judas" has sold one million copies digital downloads in the US as of February 2019.

In Canada, "Judas" debuted at number nine on the Canadian Hot 100 with three days of sales, entering the Digital Songs chart of Canada at number five with 16,000 copies sold. The next week it moved up one position to its peak of number eight, while becoming the greatest gainer on the chart in terms of airplay. The song moved from number 66 to number 23 on the Canadian Hot 100 Airplay chart, with a 161% increase in audience. In the United Kingdom, "Judas" debuted at number 14 on the UK Singles Chart on April 17, 2011, with 20,729 copies. The next week it moved to number nine. The song debuted at number nine on the French Singles Chart with 5,719 copies of the single, and has since reached a peak of seven, becoming Gaga's ninth top ten in the country, and the second of 'Born This Way' after the song of the same name, who debuted at number two. In New Zealand, "Judas" debuted at number 13 on the New Zealand Singles Chart on April 18, 2011, and also debuted at number six on the ARIA Singles Chart of Australia, which became its peak there. "Judas" was certified triple platinum in Australia by the Australian Recording Industry Association (ARIA), for sales of 210,000 equivalent units. In Ireland and Finland, "Judas" achieved a top-five debut at positions four and three respectively. Other top-ten debuts happened at Belgium (Wallonia), Norway and Spain. In Japan "Judas" debuted at number seven on the Billboard Japan Hot 100 chart. The song debuted and peaked at number 23 in the German Singles Chart, ending her consecutive top-ten placings in that charts since her debut "Just Dance".

More than a decade after its release, "Judas" experienced a resurgence fueled by its popularity on TikTok and became the most-streamed song from Born This Way, surpassing one billion streams on Spotify. It entered the Billboard Global 200 on May 3, 2025, and peaked at number 73 two weeks later.

== Music video ==
=== Development ===
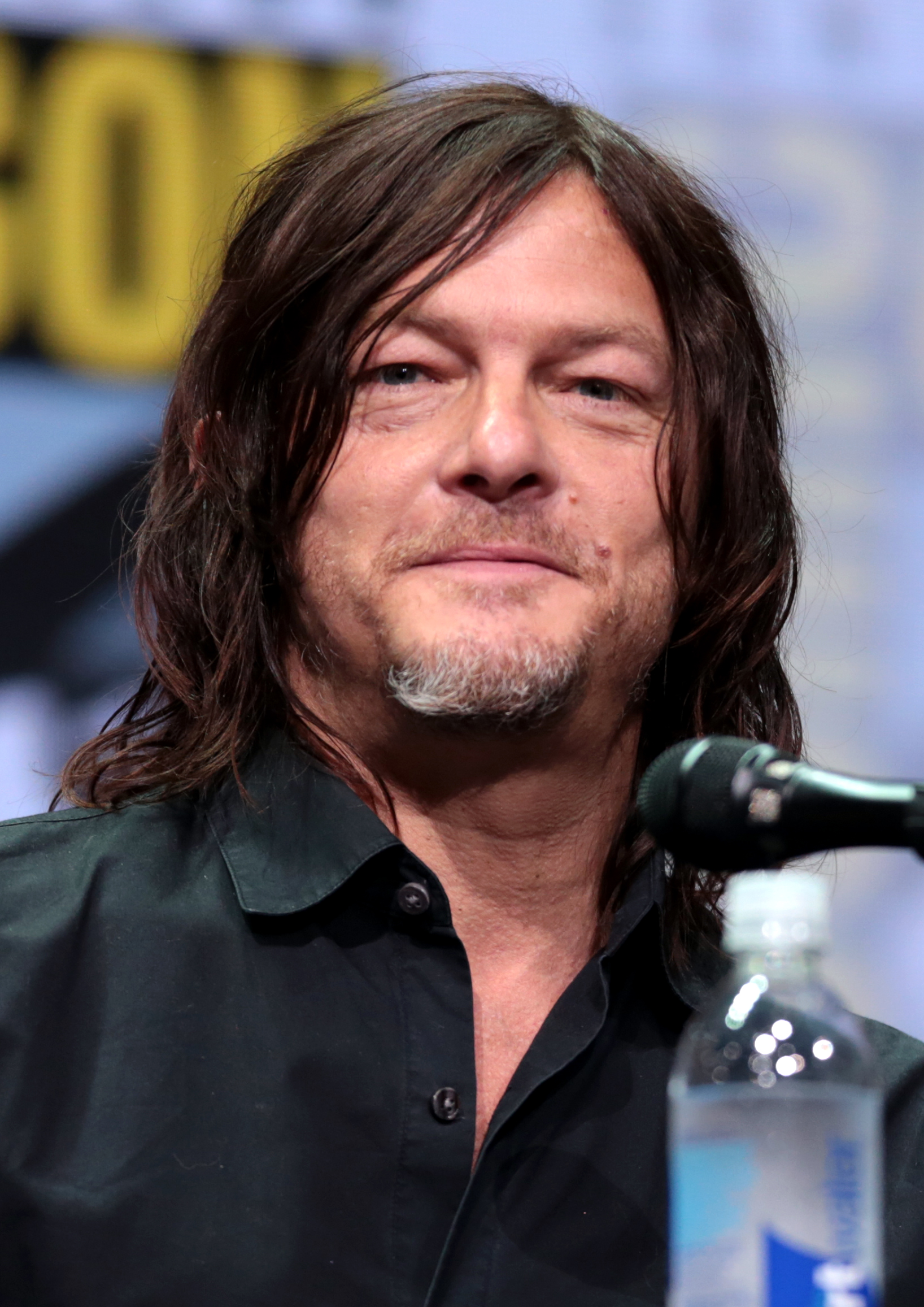
Norman Reedus played the role of Judas in the clip.

The music video for "Judas" was filmed on April 2–3, 2011, and was directed by Gaga and her then choreographer, Laurieann Gibson. The singer's stylist Thierry Mugler and creative director Nicola Formichetti announced on the coming Monday that the filming for the clip was over. The cast included Norman Reedus as Judas, while Gaga played the part of Mary Magdalene and Rick Gonzalez as the Jesus-like character. Gibson and Gaga wanted to make sure the video's direction was perfect—so they directed it themselves. Gibson explained that while working with Nick Knight on the music video for "Born This Way", they had felt that the ideas presented did not execute in a way they wanted. But with the music video of "Judas", the whole idea and the inspiration was clear enough. They had initially approached a director, but the dates did not work out with him, so Gaga's manager asked her and Gibson to direct the video instead. With MTV News, Gibson explained that there was a "groundbreaking" message in the clip, which might "shock" the audience.

Gibson said she took a moment before agreeing, as she had just wrapped up work on Gaga's Monster Ball HBO special but she could not resist in the end. "It's a phenomenal video: really powerful, really impactful," she added. With The Hollywood Reporter, Gibson explained that within the video they created a new Jerusalem. The team had two different views about the storyline and hence there were much debates about the content to be included. The shock value in the video was purposefully added, but ultimately the story was about oppression; and about following one's heart and the glory of being free.

With NME magazine Gaga revealed that the video involved motorbikes and a death sequence. She also described the portrayal of her character as being "beyond repentance", which evolved from the continuous media accusations towards her that "[she's] trashy. or pretentious or this and that. [The video] is my way of saying 'I've crossed the line, I won't even try to repent. Nor should I'." Forgiveness and destiny also played a part in the video, and Gaga wanted to portray a Federico Fellini-esque story with apostles being revolutionaries in a modern-day Jerusalem. They are led to Jesus, by Gaga as Magdalene. Although initially reported to be premiered during an episode of the tenth season of American Idol, the music video premiered on May 5, 2011, on E! News at 7 pm.

=== Synopsis ===
The scene of Gaga standing atop a rock, as waves engulf her (left), is reminiscent of Sandro Botticelli's The Birth of Venus (right).

The video opens with a motorcycle gang cruising down a freeway, wearing studded leather jackets. The motorcycle gang are the Twelve Apostles who followed Jesus, including Judas. Gaga as Mary Magdalene clutches onto a Jesus-like figure (Rick Gonzalez) who wears a golden crown of thorns. Among the riders is Judas (Norman Reedus), who crosses Gaga's bike as she looks meaningfully towards him. The gang passes under a flyover, when the song starts. They reach their rustic hideout called "Electric Chapel" where Gaga dances wearing a red sarong and a bikini top with crosses covering her nipples. Gaga's character watches curiously as the wily Judas enters the biker club and immediately gets involved in a brawl. While trying to protect Jesus from the fights she attempts to warn him about his apostle's impending betrayal, but becomes hypnotized by Judas' allure. The storyline is interspersed with choreographed dance sequences and close-ups of Gaga with stark imagery, including artistic eye make-up, which was compared to the Egyptian Eye of Horus. Her flowing blonde hair is accented by a red bandana, blue leather top and puffy white dress in different parts of the clip. The blue top worn by Gaga displays the Sacred Heart, a depiction of what Jesus is said to have revealed as a symbol of his love for humanity. During the second verses, Gaga points towards Peter during the line "Build a house", and towards herself during "Or sink a dead body".

After the second chorus, in a climatic sequence, the singer holds a gun up to Judas' mouth, and a stick of red lipstick bursts out and smears his lips. The scene portrays Gaga's choice to refuse to shoot Judas through the heart. As the breakdown ends, the music stops and Gaga is seen in a bathtub with Jesus and Judas, washing their feet and cleaning it with her hair. The sequence is interspersed with Gaga standing lonely on a rock as waves engulf her, the scene being reminiscent of Sandro Botticelli's The Birth of Venus and Jesus marching towards his fatal destiny. The music restarts and Judas is shown pouring beer in the bathtub. Next Jesus is shown standing on a stage, surrounded by his supporters, the setting being inspired by scaffoldings present around newly constructed buildings in New York. Gaga kneels in front of Jesus and tries to explain something to him, but he places his palm on her head as Judas looks on. After Judas delivers the fateful kiss upon Jesus' cheeks, marking him for his death, Gaga falls on the ground with a silent, anguished cry. The video ends with the death of neither Judas nor Jesus, but of Gaga as she's stoned to death by the crowd.

=== Reception ===
Gaga's eye make-up is compared to the Egyptian Eye of Horus.

Before its release, the Catholic League's president William Anthony Donohue criticized the music video for its portrayal of Gaga as Mary Magdalene. He spoke exclusively to HollywoodLife.com about Gaga's focus on Judas and Mary Magdalene, calling her "increasingly irrelevant" compared to people with "real talent", and attacked her for seemingly purposefully debuting the song and video close to Holy Week and Easter. Gaga noted in an interview with E! that the video was not meant to cause controversy in any way, jokingly adding "the only controversial thing about this video is that I'm wearing Christian Lacroix and Chanel in the same frame". After its release, the Catholic League released a statement clarifying that they did not find the clip to be anti-Catholic, although Gaga toyed with religious iconography in it.

Jason Lipshutz from Billboard described it as a "motorcycle mayhem meets biblical betrayal." MTV News' James Montgomery called the video as a pure pop clip, "albeit one that looks great and is sure to earn the ire of a few folks on the religious right." He added that "Judas" is, at its sacred heart, an artistic explosion contained within the confines of a traditional pop clip. Christian Blauvelt from Entertainment Weekly did not like the video at first, calling it her weakest effort to date and attributing it to Gibson's choreography and the literal storyline. However, he admitted that after watching the video a few times, he became fond of it. Tris McCall from The Star-Ledger felt that there was neither anything blasphemous about the video, nor anything too daring about it. McCall explained that the dancing in the video is a "pleasure to watch", but would have been better if the camera work was more professional. According to him, the only eye-catching prop in the video was the gun that turned into a lipstick. Matthew Perpetua from Rolling Stone was certain that the video would offend some Christians for its irreverent and highly sexualized take on Jesus Christ; he also said that Gaga interpreted the Biblical story in her own style.

Oscar Moralde from Slant Magazine complimented the production of the video by calling it "visually stunning", while adding that "'Judas' is the work of a repertory, not a revolutionary. It takes familiar swatches from Gaga's palette (the leather-and-chain aesthetic of "Telephone"; the plaintive, tear-stained camera stare of "Bad Romance") and puts them all together for a competently executed work." Phil Fox Rose, while reviewing the video for The Washington Post, gave it a positive review stating that he found it "moving, both artistically and spiritually." He then went on to explain how the religion related accusations against Gaga were completely biased. VH1 found that the video was inspired by Madonna's "Like a Prayer", Hispanic Catholicism, the films Our Lady of the Assassins, The Wild Angels and Romeo + Juliet, and the sixth season of the American television series Lost. NME named 'Judas' the fourth worst music video ever, describing it as "an attempt to jump on the Madonna/Catholicism bandwagon that so incredibly misjudged it's quite comical."

At the 2011 MuchMusic Video Awards, Gaga won the Best International Artist Video award for "Judas". The song's music video also received two nominations at the 2011 MTV Video Music Awards, in the categories of Best Choreography and Best Art Direction; however, the video won neither at the award show, losing to Beyoncé's "Run The World (Girls)" in Best Choreography, and Adele's "Rolling in the Deep" in Best Art Direction.

== Live performances ==
On April 17, 2011, Gaga performed "Judas" at a nightclub called Kennedy Lounge, in Tampa, Florida, after her Monster Ball show in the city's St. Pete Times Forum. Gaga performed "Judas" live on television for the first time on The Ellen DeGeneres Show on April 28, 2011. She was accompanied by a string of male dancers, wearing black monk-like garments, by her side. The song was performed as a dance-filled number, with Gaga singing the lines while wearing a blue latex ensemble. According to James Dinh from MTV, the "choreography [of the performance] seemingly more difficult than in her usual performances, the singer showcased her best high-energy moves." As the music came to a close, she struck a pose before planting a kiss on the cheek of DeGeneres, who playfully replicated her stance. At the 2011 Cannes Film Festival, Gaga sang the song for French television show Le Grand Journal. Wearing a gold-embellished ensemble, a red hood and a black-and-white hairstyle, Gaga performed an energetic version of the song accompanied by her male dancers, on a stage in front of the Mediterranean Sea. She explained to host Michel Denisot that the inspiration behind her look was the religious imagery and fashion portrayed in the "Judas" music video. "I've been wearing very romantic, very biblical arrangements, and I always throw in some punk rock for good measure," Gaga added.

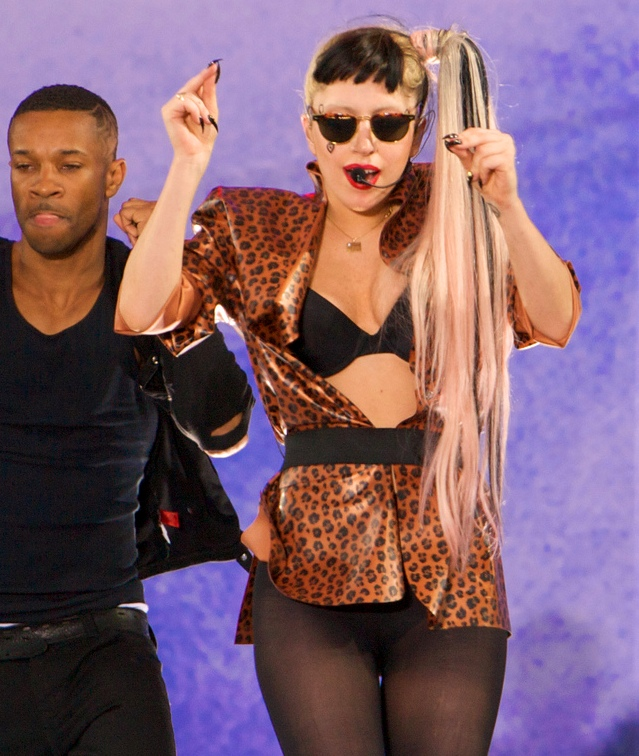
Gaga performing "Judas" on Good Morning America's "Summer Concert Series" (2011)

"Judas" was performed by Gaga on The Graham Norton Show on May 13, 2011, and two days later on Radio 1's Big Weekend in Carlisle, Cumbria. "Judas" was the final song of the setlist, and she finished her performance by taking a bow with her dancers and musicians, as confetti rained on the crowd. Gaga sang "Judas" on the season finale of Saturday Night Live on May 21, 2011, after performing the piano version of "The Edge of Glory". She was dressed in a black shiny top and knee high boots, with a metallic headgear. On May 27, 2011, Gaga also performed the song on Good Morning America as a part of their "Summer Concert Series". She wore a black sheer dress with a gold bejewelled jacket, and gold-studded bikini top and bottom. The stage was filled with steam billowing out of controlled machines. Gaga performed "Judas" on the X Factor in Paris on June 14, 2011, as a medley with "The Edge of Glory". The performance started with Gaga playing a keytar for "The Edge of Glory", wearing a fringed coat as well as a teal wig. She then removed the keytar and fringed coat, revealing a lingerie outfit which included a thong, and transitioned into "Judas". A medley of "Judas" and "Born This Way" was the closing performance on the Paul O'Grady Live show. Ryan Love of Digital Spy had a preview of the show's recording, and felt that this was the best performance of the two songs by Gaga.

"Judas" was part of the setlist of the Born This Way Ball (2012–2013) concert tour. After a speech about betrayal and loyalty, Gaga performed the track atop a turret of the big castle prop. The song contained elements of the DJ White Shadow Remix. Prior to the concert scheduled in Manila, Philippines, Gaga faced threats of incarceration and lawsuits from nearly 200 Christians from the Biblemode Youth Philippines organization. The group marched to protest about her "blasphemous" music, taking particular offense to the song "Judas", which they asserted as demeaning Jesus Christ. Responding to the protests, Gaga said in an official statement, "I'm not a creature of your government, Manila" and performed "Judas". Following the controversy, Roman Catholic legal authorities greenlit the concerts for May 21, 2012, and the following Tuesday, restricting nudity and acts deemed vulgar from the performance.

"Judas" was performed on Gaga's 2014 ArtRave: The Artpop Ball tour in a bondage-inspired black leather outfit, and between 2018–2019 at her Las Vegas residency show Enigma, where she wore an armor-like bodysuit with light-up panels and played the guitar. For her 2025 promotional concerts for Mayhem, including a headlining set at Coachella 2025, it was part of the first act of the show, and saw Gaga recreate the original choreography from the music video.

== Track listing ==
Digital download

1. "Judas" – 4:09

German CD single

1. "Judas" – 4:10
2. "Born This Way" (Twin Shadow Remix) – 4:19

Judas – The Remixes, Pt. 1

1. "Judas" (Goldfrapp Remix) – 4:42
2. "Judas" (Hurts Remix) – 3:57
3. "Judas" (Mirrors Une Autre Monde – Nuit) – 6:14
4. "Judas" (Guéna LG Club Remix) – 7:41
5. "Judas" (John Dahlbäck Remix) – 6:01
6. "Judas" (Chris Lake Remix) – 5:09
7. "Judas" (R3HAB Remix) – 4:56

Bonus track single (Note: This song was initially made available for free for users of the American iTunes Store if they had purchased either version of Born This Way before May 29, 2011, via a code sent before June 2.)

1. "Judas" (Thomas Gold Remix) – 5:32

Judas – The Remixes Part 1

1. "Judas" (Goldfrapp Remix) – 4:42
2. "Judas" (Hurts Remix) – 3:56
3. "Judas" (Mirrors Une Autre Monde – Nuit) – 6:14
4. "Judas" (Guéna LG Club Remix) – 7:40

Judas – The Remixes Part 2

1. "Judas" (Röyksopp's European Imbecile Mix) – 3:51
2. "Judas" (John Dahlbäck Remix) – 6:00
3. "Judas" (Chris Lake Remix) – 5:09
4. "Judas" (R3HAB Remix) – 4:56
5. "Judas" (Mirrors Une Autre Monde Mix – Jour) – 4:17

== Credits and personnel ==
Credits adapted from the liner notes of Born This Way.

=== Recording ===
- Recorded at Gang Studios (Paris)
- Mixed at Henson Studios (Los Angeles)
- Mastered at Oasis Mastering (Burbank, California)

=== Personnel ===
- Lady Gaga – vocals, songwriter, producer, background vocals
- Nadir "RedOne" Khayat – songwriter, producer, vocal editing, vocal arrangement, background vocals, audio engineering, instrumentation, programming, recording
- Trevor Muzzy – recording, vocal editing, audio engineering, instrumentation, programming, audio mixing
- Dave Russell – additional recording
- Gene Grimaldi – audio mastering

== Charts ==
=== Weekly charts ===
Weekly chart performance for "Judas"
Chart (2011–2013)	Peak position
Australia (ARIA)	6
Austria (Ö3 Austria Top 40)	6
Belgium (Ultratop 50 Flanders)	6
Belgium Dance (Ultratop 50 Flanders)	10
Belgium (Ultratop 50 Wallonia)	4
Belgium Dance (Ultratop 50 Wallonia)	4
Brazil Hot 100 Airplay (Billboard)	2
Canada (Canadian Hot 100)	8
Canada CHR/Top 40 (Billboard)	8
Canada Hot AC (Billboard)	15
CIS Airplay (TopHit)	67
Croatia International Airplay (HRT)	2
Czech Republic (Rádio Top 100)	10
Denmark (Tracklisten)	10
Euro Digital Song Sales (Billboard)	7
Finland (Suomen virallinen lista)	3
France (SNEP)	7
Germany (GfK)	23
Greece Digital Songs (Billboard)	7
Hungary (Dance Top 40)	12
Hungary (Rádiós Top 40)	2
Hungary (Single Top 40)	3
Ireland (IRMA)	4
Israel (Media Forest)	6
Italy Airplay (EarOne)	59
Italy (FIMI)	3
Japan Hot 100 (Billboard)	3
Luxembourg Digital Song Sales (Billboard)	2
Mexico Anglo (Monitor Latino)	4
Netherlands (Dutch Top 40)	24
Netherlands (Single Top 100)	5
New Zealand (Recorded Music NZ)	12
Norway (VG-lista)	3
Portugal Digital Song Sales (Billboard)	5
Russia Airplay (TopHit)	78
Scottish Singles Sales (Official Charts)	5
Slovakia (Rádio Top 100)	4
South Korea (Circle)	57
South Korea Foreign (Circle)	1
Spain (Promusicae)	6
Sweden (Sverigetopplistan)	7
Switzerland (Schweizer Hitparade)	8
UK Singles (Official Charts)	8
US Billboard Hot 100	10
US Adult Pop Airplay (Billboard)	40
US Dance Club Songs (Billboard)	1
US Latin Pop Airplay (Billboard)	22
US Pop Airplay (Billboard)	15
US Rhythmic Airplay (Billboard)	36

2025 weekly chart performance for "Judas"
Chart (2025)	Peak position
Brazil Hot 100 (Billboard)	15
Global 200 (Billboard)	73
Greece International (IFPI)	62
Portugal (AFP)	107
Singapore (RIAS)	8

=== Monthly charts ===
Monthly chart performance for "Judas"
Chart (2025)	Position
Brazil Streaming (Pro-Música Brasil)	48

=== Year-end charts ===
2011 year-end chart performance for "Judas"
Chart (2011)	Position
Australia (ARIA Dance)	28
Belgium (Ultratop 50 Flanders)	77
Belgium Dance (Ultratop 50 Flanders)	92
Belgium (Ultratop 50 Wallonia)	25
Belgium Dance (Ultratop 50 Wallonia)	28
Brazil (Hot Pop Songs)	7
Canada (Canadian Hot 100)	73
Croatia International Airplay (HRT)	38
France (SNEP)	48
Hungary (Dance Top 40)	69
Hungary (Rádios Top 40)	57
Italy (Musica e dischi)	54
Japan (Japan Hot 100)	14
South Korea International Singles (Gaon)	39
Spain (PROMUSICAE)	28
Sweden (Sverigetopplistan)	92
UK Singles (Official Charts)	74
US Dance Club Songs (Billboard)	41

== Certifications and sales ==
Certifications and sales for "Judas"
Region	Certification	Certified units/sales
Australia (ARIA)	3× Platinum	210,000^{‡}
Austria (IFPI Austria)	Gold	15,000^{*}
Brazil (Pro-Música Brasil)	Diamond	250,000^{‡}
Denmark (IFPI Danmark)	Gold	45,000^{‡}
Germany (BVMI)	Gold	300,000^{‡}
Italy (FIMI)	Gold	15,000^{*}
Japan (RIAJ) Full-length ringtone	Gold	100,000^{*}
Japan (RIAJ) PC download	Gold	100,000^{*}
New Zealand (RMNZ)	Platinum	30,000^{‡}
South Korea	—	367,533
Spain (Promusicae)	Gold	20,000^{*}
Spain (Promusicae) Since 2015	Gold	30,000^{‡}
Sweden (GLF)	Platinum	40,000^{‡}
United Kingdom (BPI)	Platinum	600,000^{‡}
United States (RIAA)	2× Platinum	2,000,000^{‡}
Streaming
Greece (IFPI Greece)	Platinum	2,000,000^{†}
^{*} Sales figures based on certification alone.^{‡} Sales+streaming figures based on certification alone.^{†} Streaming-only figures based on certification alone.

== Release history ==
Release dates and formats for "Judas"
Region	Date	Format	Version	Label(s)	Ref.
Various	April 15, 2011	Digital download	Original	Interscope	
Germany	April 15, 2011	CD	Original	Interscope	
France	April 17, 2011	Radio airplay	Original	Universal	
Italy	April 17, 2011	Radio airplay	Original	Universal	
United States	April 26, 2011	Contemporary hit radio	Original	Interscope	
Germany	May 13, 2011	CD	2-track	Interscope	
Germany	May 13, 2011	CD	The remixes, pt. 1	Interscope	
Poland	May 13, 2011	CD	2-track	Universal Poland	
Various	May 16, 2011	CD	The remixes, pt. 1	Streamline; KonLive; Interscope	
Various	May 16, 2011	Digital download	The remixes, pt. 1	Interscope	
Italy	May 17, 2011	CD	Original	Universal	
United States	May 24, 2011	CD	Original	Interscope	
Australia	May 30, 2011	Digital download	The remixes, pt. 2	Interscope	
Brazil	May 30, 2011	Digital download	The remixes, pt. 2	Interscope	
Europe	May 30, 2011	Digital download	The remixes, pt. 2	Interscope	
Japan	May 30, 2011	Digital download	The remixes, pt. 2	Interscope	
New Zealand	May 30, 2011	Digital download	The remixes, pt. 2	Interscope	
United States	May 31, 2011	Digital download	Thomas Gold remix	Interscope	
Various	June 28, 2011	Digital download	Thomas Gold remix	Streamline; Interscope	
Germany	July 1, 2011	CD	The remixes, pt. 2	Interscope	

== See also ==
- List of Billboard Hot 100 top-ten singles in 2011
- List of Billboard Dance Club Songs number ones of 2011
