= Livingroom Studios =

Recording studio based in Oslo, Norway

- Interactive map of the Livingroom Studios area

General information
- Location: Oslo, Norway
- Coordinates: 59°54′51″N 10°44′55″E

Website
- LivingRoom Studios website

Livingroom Studios is a recording studio in Oslo, Norway.

Started in 1999 by producer/songwriter Espen Berg, Livingroom Studios is one of Norway's main music studio facilities.

The studio is home to the producer/songwriter team Espen Berg and Simen Eriksrud, as well as the mix engineer George Tandero.

== Clients ==
The following are clients of Livingroom Studios:

- Lady Gaga
- Donkeyboy
- Diana Vickers
- Loreen
