= Born This Way: The Collection =

Box set by Lady Gaga
- Released: November 18, 2011
- Recorded: 2010–2011
- Length: 268:24
- Label: Streamline; Interscope; KonLive

Lady Gaga chronology
Born This Way: The Remix (2011)	Born This Way: The Collection (2011)	A Very Gaga Holiday (2011)

Born This Way: The Collection is the second box set by American singer-songwriter Lady Gaga, released on November 18, 2011, by Interscope Records. The three-disc set includes her studio album Born This Way, the remix album Born This Way: The Remix, and the DVD Lady Gaga Presents the Monster Ball Tour: At Madison Square Garden. Photographer Nick Knight shot the cover of the release, which showed Gaga wearing a dress made of slime by designer Bart Hess. The box set was enclosed as a digipak with new booklets. The release received positive feedback from reviewers, but had minor commercial success, only entering charts in Greece, Italy, and South Korea.

== Background ==
In October 2011, Lady Gaga announced plans to release a box set titled Born This Way: The Collection and a remix album titled Born This Way: The Remix. The box set was first released in Germany on November 18, 2011, and consisted of a 17-track version of Gaga's second studio album, Born This Way, the aforementioned remix album and a DVD release of the HBO concert special Lady Gaga Presents the Monster Ball Tour: At Madison Square Garden. Along with the collection, she also planned to release a coffee table book called Lady Gaga x Terry Richardson, containing pictures shot during The Monster Ball Tour. The album cover was released on October 21, 2011. The image shows Gaga wearing a dress made of slime by designer Bart Hess, a Perspex hat made by Charlie le Mindu, and heels by Alexander McQueen. Photographer Nick Knight shot the cover, and was initially one of the outtakes from the imagery shot for Born This Way, later re-touched and re-used as the box set's cover. New booklets were also provided alongside the regular ones and the whole case was in a digipak.

== Reception ==
Stephen Thomas Erlewine of AllMusic gave a positive review, saying that the album is "for any fan of the singer who somehow has failed to pick up any or all of these along the way, this is a convenient way to grab all this Gaga at once". Idolator created a contest for a fan to win the box set, by tweeting about the release and e-mailing the website. Born This Way: The Collection debuted on the Greek Albums Chart at number 67 on the chart of December 16, 2011. The following week the album climbed eighteen positions, reaching number 49, which became its peak there. The album debuted on South Korean International Albums Chart at number 18 on the chart of December 3, 2011, remaining on the chart of South Korea for just one week.

== Track listing ==
=== Born This Way (Special Edition) ===
Disc one
No.	Title	Writer(s)	Producer(s)	Length
1.	"Marry the Night"	Lady Gaga, Fernando Garibay	Lady Gaga, Garibay	4:25
2.	"Born This Way"	Lady Gaga, Jeppe Laursen	Lady Gaga, Laursen, Garibay, DJ White Shadow	4:20
3.	"Government Hooker"	Lady Gaga, Garibay, DJ White Shadow	Lady Gaga, DJ White Shadow, Garibay*, DJ Snake*	4:14
4.	"Judas"	Lady Gaga, RedOne	Lady Gaga, RedOne	4:09
5.	"Americano"	Lady Gaga, Garibay, DJ White Shadow, Alara	Lady Gaga, Garibay, DJ White Shadow	4:07
6.	"Hair"	Lady Gaga, RedOne	Lady Gaga, RedOne	5:08
7.	"Scheiße"	Lady Gaga, RedOne	Lady Gaga, RedOne	3:46
8.	"Bloody Mary"	Lady Gaga, Garibay, DJ White Shadow	Lady Gaga, DJ White Shadow, Garibay*, Sparks*	4:05
9.	"Black Jesus + Amen Fashion"	Lady Gaga, DJ White Shadow	Lady Gaga, DJ White Shadow	3:36
10.	"Bad Kids"	Lady Gaga, Laursen, Garibay, DJ White Shadow	Lady Gaga, Laursen, Garibay, DJ White Shadow	3:51
11.	"Fashion of His Love"	Lady Gaga, Garibay	Lady Gaga, Garibay	3:39
12.	"Highway Unicorn (Road to Love)"	Lady Gaga, Garibay, DJ White Shadow	Lady Gaga, Garibay, DJ White Shadow	4:16
13.	"Heavy Metal Lover"	Lady Gaga, Garibay	Lady Gaga, Garibay	4:13
14.	"Electric Chapel"	Lady Gaga, DJ White Shadow	Lady Gaga, DJ White Shadow	4:12
15.	"The Queen"	Lady Gaga, Garibay	Lady Gaga, Garibay	5:17
16.	"You and I"	Lady Gaga	Lady Gaga, Lange	5:07
17.	"The Edge of Glory"	Lady Gaga, Garibay, DJ White Shadow	Lady Gaga, Garibay	5:21
Total length:				71:46

=== Born This Way: The Remix ===
Disc two
No.	Title	Length
1.	"Born This Way" (Zedd Remix)	6:31
2.	"Judas" (Goldfrapp Remix)	4:41
3.	"The Edge of Glory" (Foster the People Remix)	6:09
4.	"You and I" (Wild Beasts Remix)	3:50
5.	"Marry the Night" (The Weeknd & Illangelo Remix)	4:03
6.	"Black Jesus + Amen Fashion" (Michael Woods Remix)	6:11
7.	"Bloody Mary" (The Horrors Remix)	5:18
8.	"Scheiße" (Guéna LG Club Remix)	5:45
9.	"Americano" (Gregori Klosman Remix)	6:07
10.	"Electric Chapel" (Two Door Cinema Club Remix)	3:59
11.	"You and I" (Metronomy Remix)	4:20
12.	"Judas" (Hurts Remix)	3:57
13.	"Born This Way" (Twin Shadow Remix)	4:05
14.	"The Edge of Glory" (Sultan & Ned Shepard Remix)	6:33
Total length:		69:29

=== Lady Gaga Presents the Monster Ball Tour: At Madison Square Garden ===
DVD
No.	Title	Length
1.	"Intro"	4:29
2.	"Dance in the Dark"	2:33
3.	"Glitter & Grease"	2:37
4.	"Just Dance"	4:22
5.	"Beautiful, Dirty, Rich"	4:21
6.	"The Fame"	4:15
7.	"LoveGame"	10:41
8.	"Boys Boys Boys"	3:18
9.	"Money Honey"	3:16
10.	"Telephone"	6:34
11.	"Speechless"	6:16
12.	"You and I"	9:24
13.	"So Happy I Could Die"	4:44
14.	"Monster"	6:37
15.	"Teeth"	9:42
16.	"Alejandro"	5:25
17.	"Poker Face"	3:56
18.	"Paparazzi"	6:31
19.	"Bad Romance"	6:22
20.	"Born This Way"	9:00
21.	"Born This Way" (a cappella)	3:16
22.	"Backstage at the Monster Ball"	12:50
23.	"Photo Gallery"
Total length:		127:09

== Charts ==
Weekly chart performance for Born This Way: The Collection
Chart (2011–2013)	Peak position
Greek Albums (IFPI)	66
Italian Albums (FIMI)	98
South Korean International Albums (Circle)	18

== Release history ==
Release dates and formats for Born This Way: The Collection
Region	Date	Format	Label	Edition
Germany	November 18, 2011	CD+DVD	Universal Music	Standard
Canada	November 21, 2011	CD+DVD	Universal Music	Standard
Japan	November 21, 2011	CD+DVD	Streamline, Interscope, KonLive	Standard
United Kingdom	November 21, 2011	CD+DVD	Polydor	Standard
United Kingdom	November 21, 2011	CD+DVD	Streamline, Interscope, KonLive	Standard
United States	November 21, 2011	CD+DVD	Streamline, Interscope, KonLive	Standard
Canada	November 29, 2011	CD+DVD	Streamline, Interscope, KonLive	Deluxe
Japan	November 29, 2011	CD+DVD	Polydor	Deluxe
United States	December 27, 2011	CD+DVD	101 Distribution	Deluxe
