= Born This Way =

Born This Way may refer to:

== Music ==
- Born This Way (album), a 2011 album by Lady Gaga
  - "Born This Way" (song), the title song
  - Born This Way: The Remix, a 2011 remix album by Lady Gaga
  - Born This Way: The Collection, a 2011 compilation album that includes the remix album
- Born This Way (Cookie Crew album), 1989, as well as a single on the album
- "Born This Way", a 2014 single by Thousand Foot Krutch from Oxygen: Inhale
- "Born This Way", a song by Dusty Springfield from Reputation
- "Born This Way", a song from the 1993 musical Whoop-Dee-Doo!

== Television ==
- Born This Way (TV series), 2015
- "Born This Way" (Glee), an episode of Glee
- "Born This Way", an episode of Being Erica

== Other ==
- Born This Way, a fictional power in the manga JoJolion

== See also ==
- Born This Way Ball, a tour by Lady Gaga in support of her second studio album, Born This Way
- Born This Way Foundation, a non-profit organization founded in 2011 by Lady Gaga and her mother, Cynthia Germanotta
- "I Was Born This Way", a 1946 song by Stubby Kaye
- "I Was Born This Way", a 1975 song by Valentino
- Born That Way, a 1995 album by Boy Howdy
