= Electric Chapel =

- Vinyl box set picture disc cover

Song by Lady Gaga

from the album Born This Way
- Published: May 18, 2011
- Released: May 23, 2011
- Studio: Officine Meccaniche (Milan)
- Genre: Electro-rock
- Length: 4:12
- Label: Streamline; KonLive; Interscope
- Songwriters: Lady Gaga; Paul Blair aka DJ White Shadow
- Producers: Lady Gaga; Paul Blair aka DJ White Shadow

Audio video
- "Electric Chapel" on YouTube

"Electric Chapel" is a song recorded by American singer Lady Gaga for her second studio album, Born This Way (2011). Written and produced by Gaga and DJ White Shadow, the recording premiered on Facebook gaming app FarmVille, as did the album's fifth single, "Marry the Night". Gaga revealed on Twitter that "Electric Chapel" was written in Australia and finished on her tour bus in Europe. She recorded it channeling the vocals of bands like Duran Duran, and singers Cher and Billy Idol.

"Electric Chapel" is an electro-rock song that incorporates elements of 1980s pop music and heavy metal in its composition. Critics praised the track, with Dan Martin from NME comparing it to the work of Madonna; other reviewers noted the rock and sci-fi musical elements associated in it. "Electric Chapel" reached number 23 on Billboard's Dance/Electronic Digital Songs chart and number 144 on the South Korean International Download Chart. It was performed on Gaga's Born This Way Ball tour (2012–2013), where she sang it while standing inside a set piece that had the song's name written on top.

== Background and composition ==
"Electric Chapel" was first previewed in Gaga's Transmission Gagavision 44, which featured a portion of the song's instrumental and displayed its title on a piece of paper near the end of the video. The title was later referenced in the music video for "Judas" (2011), where a biker bar named Electric Chapel appeared. Subsequently, Gaga revealed on Twitter that the song was written in Australia and finished on her tour bus in Europe. Describing the recording's lyrical themes as delving on "needing to feel safe to find love", it was theorized by a writer from Take 40 Australia to be inspired by the singer's 2009 live performance on Australia's The Chapel arena. Following "Marry the Night", "Electric Chapel" was made available through GagaVille, a Lady Gaga-themed promotional area in the social-network game FarmVille, on May 18, 2011. It formed part of the game's second GagaVille quest, which was named after the song. Players who completed a series of tasks received early access to the track, along with an "Electric Chapel" dance club decoration for their farm.

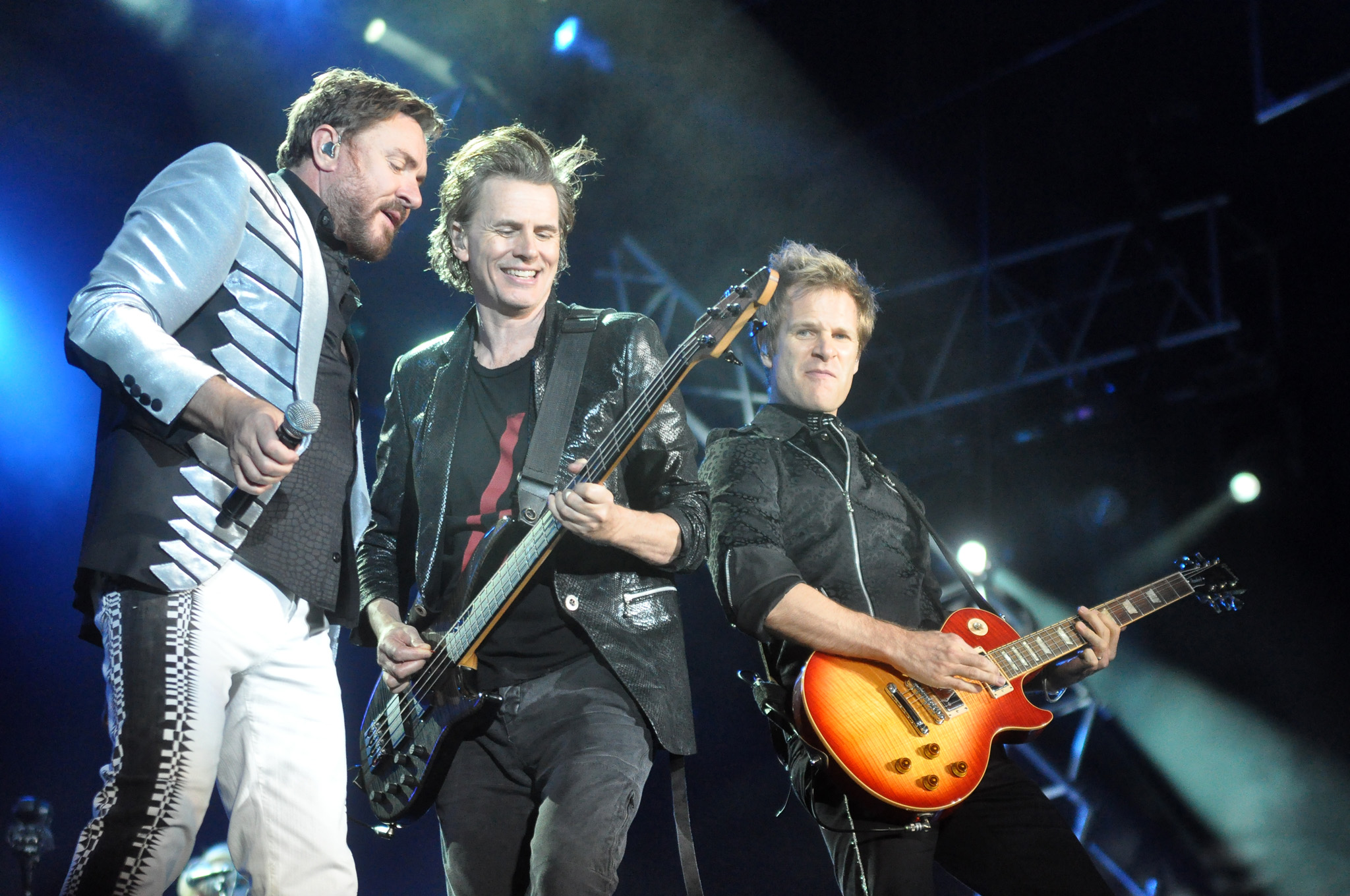
Gaga channeled the vocals of bands like Duran Duran (pictured) on "Electric Chapel".

"Electric Chapel" has been compared to the work of Madonna, with NME's Dan Martin saying that "if you'd ever wondered what that Madonna doing the soundtrack to Blade Runner might have sounded like... then wonder no more." Genre-wise, Brian Hiatt of Rolling Stone referred to "Electric Chapel" as an electro-rock recording, while Kristen S. Hé of Vulture described it as one that "throbs like neon synthwave with a heavy-metal edge", and compared its opening riff to Judas Priest. Gaga recorded the chorus a number of times, channeling the vocals of bands like Duran Duran, and singers Cher and Billy Idol. Inspired by 1980s music, the track incorporates a spoken word section, which Gaga wanted to sound like The B-52's song "Rock Lobster" (1978). She explained to Brian Hiatt of Rolling Stone that when she "say[s] 'electric chapel,' something needs to occur... It needs to be more fantasy. You should see the empress of the Vatican unicorn planet appear and soar across the nightclub."

Writing for music website Beats Per Minute, Brent Koepp described the song as "Iron Maiden meets 80s pop". According to the sheet music published by Musicnotes.com, "Electric Chapel" has a time signature of common time, and a pop-rock tempo of 128 beats per minute. The song is composed in the key of A minor with Gaga's vocals ranging from E_{3} to C_{5}. It also has a basic sequence of Am–Dm–Am–Dm–F serving as its chord progression. "Electric Chapel" was later remixed by Irish indie rock band Two Door Cinema Club; this version was included on the singer's second remix album titled Born This Way: The Remix (2011). Gaga unveiled the remix during a cover shoot for Elle magazine. A reviewer from BBC Music complimented the remix, saying that "Two Door Cinema Club almost make 'Electric Chapel' sound like a collaboration between Gaga and Hot Chip".

== Reception ==
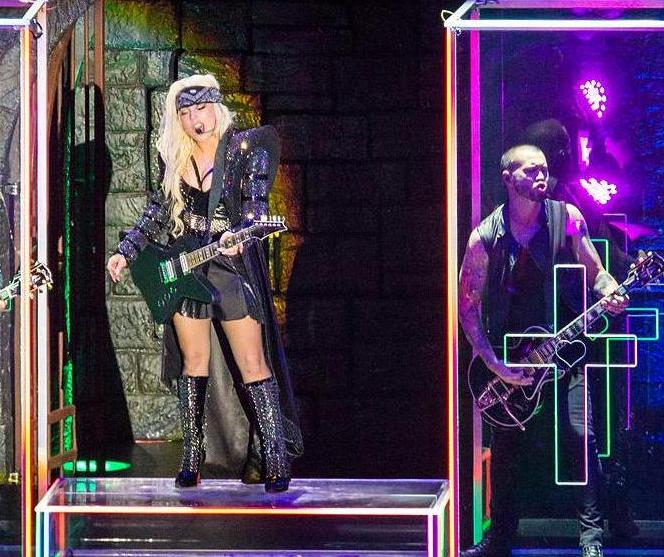
Gaga performing "Electric Chapel" on her Born This Way Ball tour in Manchester, September 2012

Overall, "Electric Chapel" received positive reviews from music critics. Caryn Ganz of Spin wrote that "Electric Chapel" "pairs divine diva thump with a Van Halen guitar solo." Vulture's Kristen S. Héhe proclaimed that "if you're still confused about the album's infamous bionic-motorbike cover, 'Electric Chapel' should make you a believer." NME writer Dan Martin published a review on the song, confessing that "perhaps ['Electric Chapel'] nails the record's blood-and-chrome aesthetics most effectively of all." In another review, Martin compared its opening riffs to Opus III's 1983 song "It's a Fine Day", with him further likening the recording to science fiction music. Kerri Mason from Billboard described the track as a "technicolor wedding" with a "fat guitar riff". Bradley Stern from MuuMuse praised the cut, feeling that "Gaga takes Born This Way to new levels of pop-dom on cuts like the jagged 'Electric Chapel' and 'Heavy Metal Lover'".

Ann Powers from NPR noticed the influence of Duran Duran in the track, while believing Gaga to imagine "Electric Chapel" as an output from "an electric guitar-wielding girl group". While reviewing every track from Born This Way, Rolling Stone's Jody Rosen observed that in "Electric Chapel" Gaga wrote about hoping for a monogamous relationship, with heavy guitar riffs and metal solo being characteristics of the record. In an article in GQ about 10 detrimental things on Born This Way, a writer from the magazine listed the track's lyrics as "reek[ing] of a lack of ideas, not a distortion of form. Sing words. It's easy". Adam White of The Independent found the song "enjoyably icy but ultimately not that memorable."

"Electric Chapel" debuted and peaked at number 23 on Billboard's Dance/Electronic Digital Songs chart on the issue dated June 11, 2011, spending one week on the chart. It also made an appearance at number 144 on the South Korean International Download Chart.

== Live performances ==
Gaga performed "Electric Chapel" on her Born This Way Ball tour (2012–2013). The track was included during the tour's third segment, where Gaga performed "The Queen" and "You and I", before transcending into "Electric Chapel" and "Americano" from Born This Way. The singer was present inside a glass set piece onstage, referred by her as an electric chapel. Sean Sennett from The Australian complimented the performance of the song, saying that "by the time 'Electric Chapel' has rolled around the band are shredding like a glorious 80s LA metal act". Kwaak Je-yup from The Korea Times gave positive feedback to Gaga for singing live during the tour, but found her voice cracked during "Electric Chapel".

== Credits and personnel ==
=== Recording and management ===
- Recorded at Officine Meccaniche in Milan, Italy
- Mixed at Setai Recording Studio (Miami Beach)
- Mastered at Oasis Mastering (Burbank, California)
- Published by Stefani Germanotta P/K/A Lady Gaga (BMI) Sony/ATV Songs, LLC/ House of Gaga Publishing, LLC / GloJoe Music Inc. (BMI)
- Maxwell and Carter Publishing, LLC (ASCAP), administered by Universal Music Publishing Group and Maxwell and Carter Publishing, LLC (BMI) administered by Universal Music Publishing Group.

=== Personnel ===
- Lady Gaga – vocals, songwriter, producer
- DJ White Shadow – drum programming, keyboards
- Brian Gaynor – keyboards, bass
- Kareem "Jesus" Devlin Byrne – guitars
- Dave Russell – recording, mixing
- Gene Grimaldi – audio mastering
- Philip Knight – assistant

== Charts ==
Weekly chart performance for "Electric Chapel"
Chart (2011)	Peak position
South Korea International (GAON)	144
US Dance/Electronic Digital Songs (Billboard)	23
