= Born This Way: The Remix =

Remix album by Lady Gaga
- Released: November 18, 2011
- Recorded: 2010–2011
- Genres: Electronic; dance
- Length: 71:27
- Labels: Streamline; Interscope; KonLive
- Producers: Cheche Alara; DJ Aqeel; Svein Berge; Torbjørn Brundtland; Foster the People; Fernando Garibay; Goldfrapp; Guéna LG; The Horrors; Hurts; Illangelo; Gregori Klosman; Lady Gaga; Jeppe Laursen; Mark Taylor; Metronomy; Joseph Mount; RedOne; Röyksopp; Sultan & Ned Shepard; Twin Shadow; Two Door Cinema Club; The Weeknd; Paul "DJ White Shadow" Blair; Wild Beasts; Michael Woods; Zedd

Lady Gaga chronology
Born This Way (2011)	Born This Way: The Remix (2011)	Born This Way: The Collection (2011)

Born This Way: The Remix is the second remix album by American singer-songwriter Lady Gaga, released on November 18, 2011, by Interscope. This album contains remixes of multiple songs from Gaga's studio album, Born This Way. It was also released as part of the Born This Way: The Collection, a special edition release including the 17-track version of Gaga's studio album and a DVD release of the HBO concert special Lady Gaga Presents the Monster Ball Tour: At Madison Square Garden. Most of the remixes had been available in the remix EPs released alongside each single from Born This Way. Musically, the album is an electronic and dance record; there are also influences of Europop, techno and dubstep within the composition.

Critics gave mixed reviews for the album, with their general complaint being that the release was unnecessary. Most of them, however, complimented The Weeknd, Twin Shadow and Guéna LG's remixes. It earned an overall score of 57 out of 100, on review aggregator site Metacritic. Commercially, Born This Way: The Remix achieved minor success, entering the charts in ten countries. Its highest peak position was attained in Japan, where it reached number 14. It also peaked at number 105 on the Billboard 200 chart in the United States.

== Background ==
In October 2011, Lady Gaga announced plans to release a remix album titled Born This Way: The Remix. The album contains fourteen remixes of tracks from her second studio album, Born This Way, only seven of which are unreleased. Born This Way: The Remix was also released as part of Born This Way: The Collection, a special edition release including the 17-track version of Gaga's second studio album and a DVD release of the HBO concert special Lady Gaga Presents the Monster Ball Tour: At Madison Square Garden. The remixers featured for the songs on the album include mainly techno musicians like Sultan & Ned Shepard, electropop producers like Goldfrapp and Metronomy, indie rock upstarts like Twin Shadow and Two Door Cinema Club, and then up-and-coming Canadian singer-songwriter the Weeknd.

Most of the remixes had been available in the remix EPs released alongside each single from Born This Way. The first remix commissioned was the Twin Shadow remix of "Born This Way", released in March 2011. This was followed by the Goldfrapp remix of "Judas" in May 2011, which was released to Gaga's YouTube channel. The Wild Beasts remix of "You and I" was released in August 2011, and the proceeds from the sales helped to raise awareness to the ways people can support independent labels that lost stock in the PIAS Recordings UK warehouse fire.

Regarding the inspiration behind the remix, Hayden Thorpe from Wild Beasts group told The Guardian: "The unlikeness of this match was perhaps what compelled us to take it on. Gaga in many ways is the epitome of what we are not. She is the butcher to our butter knife. The essential thrill is always to keep eluding what is expected of us and what we expect of ourselves." The last of the remix to be released was The Weeknd's take on "Marry the Night" which featured Illangelo, thus earning him a co-producer credit on it.

== Composition ==
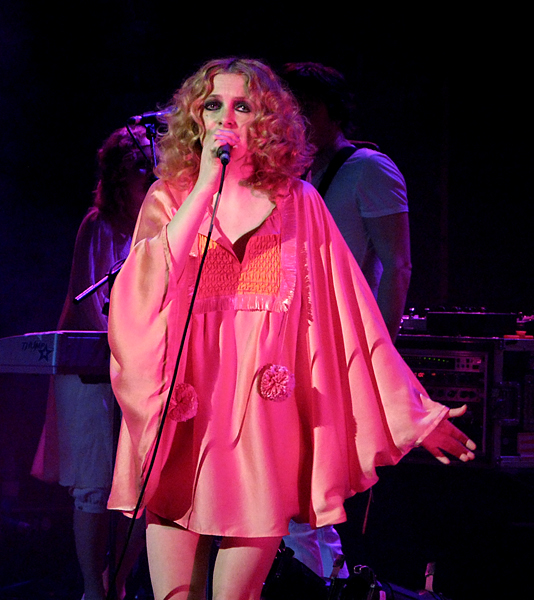
Goldfrapp remixed Born This Way's second single, "Judas".

The album opens with the Zedd remix of "Born This Way" which begins with some minimalist beat followed by loud synths, and consists of a techno breakdown. The Goldfrapp remix of "Judas" follows as the second track; the remix consists of industrial music and Gaga's vocals are converted to a slow, low-key moan making it almost like a man's voice. Foster the People remixed "The Edge of Glory" and introduced a new break down from the 3:20 time sequence. Producers Abel Tesfaye, known professionally as the Weeknd, and Illangelo kept the overall feel of "Marry the Night" intact, but introduced vocals by Tesfaye and a steely looping drum machine. Jason Lipshultz from Billboard described the addition as "directly conflict[ing] with Gaga's M.O. But like so many of these remixes, the Weeknd marries his vision of the song to Gaga's gorgeous voice without losing the original's integrity." Tesfaye's voice can be heard in spots on the song, adding an occasional "Ooh yeah" and a moan; ultimately at the 2:20 mark, the song collapses on itself and ditches the percussion for infrequent piano notes. The remix of "Black Jesus + Amen Fashion" retains most of the composition of its original counterpart, although it introduces a new synth by Michael Woods, thus turning it into a rave-trance track. The Horrors remix of Born This Way album track "Bloody Mary" consisted of Gaga's vocals fading in and out of sequence. "Scheiße" featured influences from The Knife song "Heartbeats" (2003) as well as Vengaboys' "We Like to Party" (1999). "Electric Chapel"'s composition is completely changed by Two Door Cinema, altering the dark mood of the song to a fun and engaging one. The Metronomy remix of "You and I" varies little from its original equivalent, while dubstep is introduced in the Hurts remix of "Judas", with a different conclusion. Sultan & Ned Shepard's remix of "The Edge of Glory", the last track on the album, features pumping drums and slinking synths.

== Critical reception ==
Professional ratings
Aggregate scores
Source	Rating
Metacritic	57/100
Review scores
Source	Rating
AllMusic	3/5 stars
BBC	(Positive)
Billboard	(Mixed)
Consequence of Sound	3/5 stars
Rolling Stone	2.5/5 stars
Slant Magazine	2/5 stars

After its release, Born This Way: The Remix received mixed reviews from critics. It earned an overall score of 57 out of 100, on review aggregator site Metacritic. Jason Lipshultz from Billboard commented that the album did not re-invent anything new in terms of remix composition, but instead "gives less recognizable artists a platform to tinker with these complex pop schemes." He added that the album is not essential listening for non-Gaga diehards, "but electronica fans who have yet to drink the Mother Monster kool-aid will find plenty of pristinely produced club tracks to groove to. The album is a great avenue for fans to digest new versions of their favorite songs of the year, as well as discover artists that are trying to command audiences the way Gaga so masterfully does." Stephen Thomas Erlewine from AllMusic gave the album three out of five stars, commenting that "some remixes take considerable liberty, ditching verses or hooks, whatever catches their fancy. So, it’s a remix album not for fairweather travelers but rather the hardcore Little Monsters, the kind who love every gesture grand or small from Gaga, but it also displays enough imagination to appeal to those listeners who fall into neither camp and are only looking for some darkly elastic dance." Harley Brown of Consequence of Sound website was impressed with the diversity of remixes on the album, prompting him to comment that "just in time for the holiday season, there’s something for everyone on Born This Way: The Remix. And, unlike many remix albums featuring one song reworked again and again, this Remix comprises a diverse tracklist to match the diverse list of remixers."

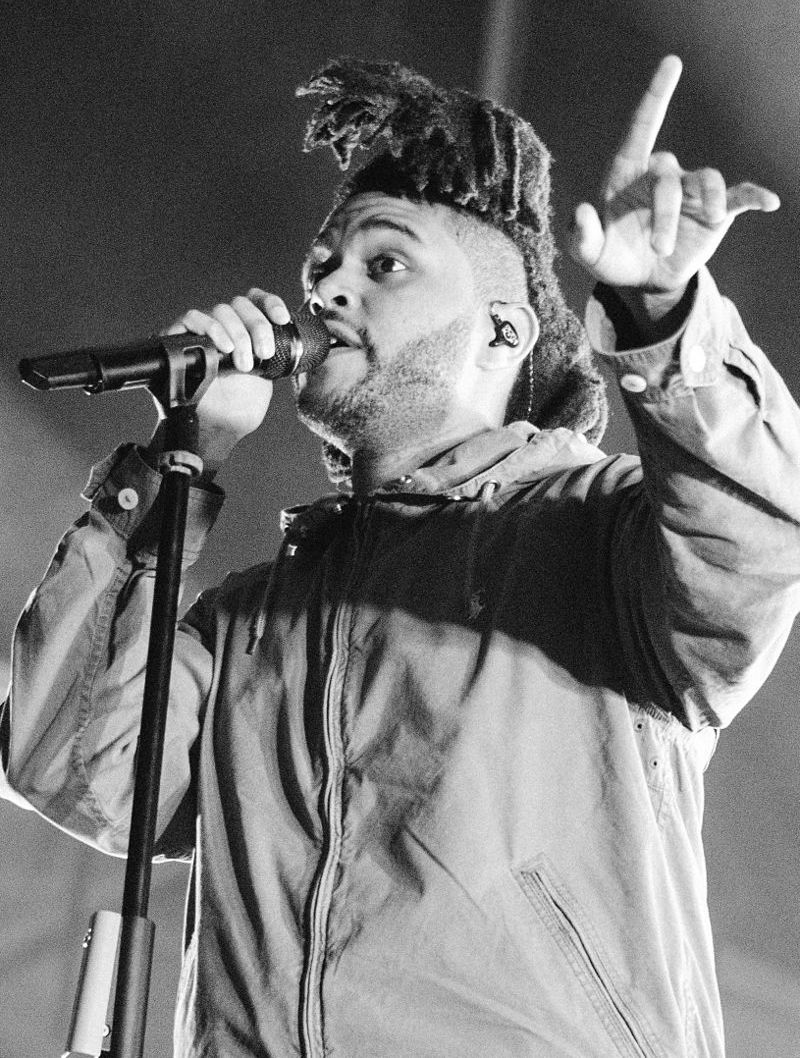
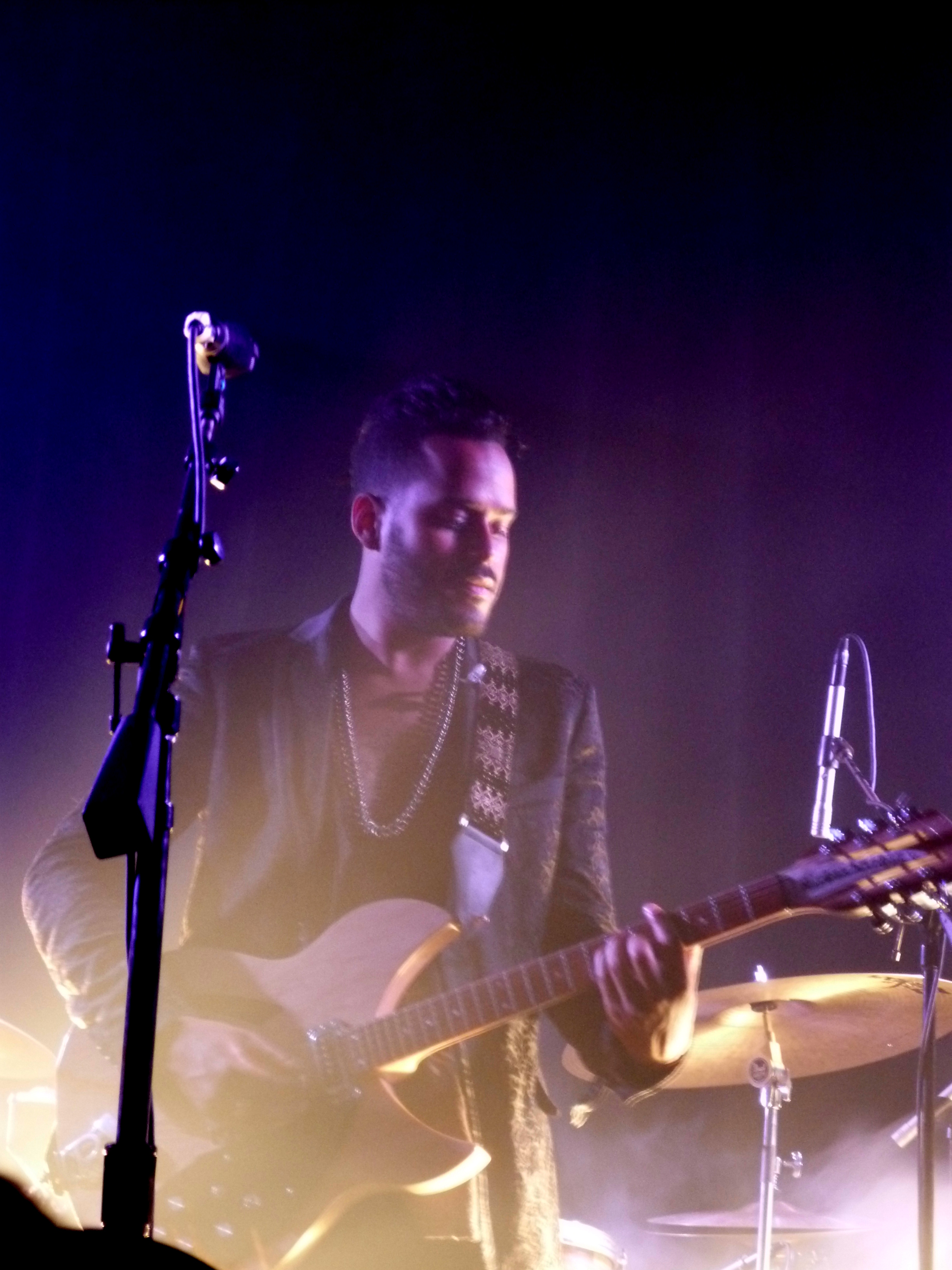
The Weeknd and Twin Shadow's respective remixes of "Marry the Night" and "Born This Way" were complimented by some critics.

Jody Rosen from Rolling Stone gave a mixed review of the album, wondering why the remix album was necessary to be released in the first place. She nevertheless added that "[t]he album has some diverting moments. Goldfrapp's down-tempo 'Judas' is less a remix than a smart cover, and the Weeknd and Illangelo re-imagine 'Marry the Night' as a strobe-y, atmospheric R&B epic. But there are two or three duds for each winner—like the bludgeoning 'Scheiße', a gratuitous exercise that strives to make a dance-floor thumper out of a song that was born that way." Rosen's view was shared by Paul Schrodt from Slant Magazine, who gave the album a rating of two out of five stars. Rice's main complaint was that "[c]ertain artists cry out for the remix treatment more than others, usually those whose vocal talents are relatively straightforward and could benefit from the extra fuss." He added that Gaga was not such an artist and that the original Born This Way album "in particular, is too big and untamed, full of too many of its own references and styles, from Springsteen to Madonna. As such, it's best enjoyed on its own flawed, bombastic terms." Nick Levine, reviewing the album for BBC Music felt that most of the tracks are already available as digital downloads and CD singles, "so it's easy to dismiss Born This Way: The Remix as inessential and, yes, a cash-in. But taken as a whole, this release offers enough revelations to suggest the original album is worth revisiting. That additional purpose, whether intentional or not, feels at least partly fulfilled." Levine complimented The Weeknd and Twin Shadow's remixes, while criticizing Foster the People and Sultan & Ned Shepard for their predictable remixes.

In a 2026 retrospective review of Lady Gaga's discography for Spin, Al Shipley argued that Born This Way was less consistently danceable than Gaga's earlier releases, and Born This Way: The Remix succeeded in making most of its songs "more disco-ready". He highlighted Goldfrapp's remix of "Judas" for transforming the original's fast pace into an "ominous slow grind" and praised Zedd's and Twin Shadow's remixes of "Born This Way" as "creative, satisfying reworks" of the song.

== Commercial performance ==
In the United Kingdom, Born This Way: The Remix entered the UK Albums Chart at number 77, for the issue dated December 12, 2011. In Japan, the album sold 12,120 copies in its first week, and debuted at number 14 on the Japanese Albums Chart. In its second week, the album fell down to number 19 while selling 6,650 copies. It has been certified gold by the Recording Industry Association of Japan (RIAJ) for shipment of 100,000 copies. In the United States, the album debuted outside the top 100 of the Billboard 200 albums chart, at number 105, while debuting at number three on the Dance/Electronic Albums chart. As of April 2016, Born This Way: The Remix has sold 62,000 copies in the US according to Nielsen SoundScan. Other nations where the album attained top-100 positions included Italy, France and Spain.

== Track listing ==
Born This Way: The Remix track listing
No.	Title	Length
1.	"Born This Way" (Zedd remix)	6:30
2.	"Judas" (Goldfrapp remix)	4:41
3.	"The Edge of Glory" (Foster the People Remix)	6:10
4.	"You and I" (Wild Beasts Remix)	3:50
5.	"Marry the Night" (The Weeknd & Illangelo remix)	4:03
6.	"Black Jesus + Amen Fashion" (Michael Woods remix)	6:10
7.	"Bloody Mary" (The Horrors remix)	5:18
8.	"Scheiße" (Guéna LG Club remix)	5:44
9.	"Americano" (Gregori Klosman remix)	6:07
10.	"Electric Chapel" (Two Door Cinema Club remix)	3:59
11.	"You and I" (Metronomy remix)	4:19
12.	"Judas" (Hurts remix)	3:58
13.	"Born This Way" (Twin Shadow remix)	4:05
14.	"The Edge of Glory" (Sultan & Ned Shepard remix)	6:34
Total length:		71:27

iTunes bonus track
No.	Title	Length
15.	"Judas" (Röyksopp's 30 Pieces remix)	9:18
Total length:		80:45

Japanese limited edition bonus tracks
No.	Title	Length
15.	"You and I" (Mark Taylor remix radio edit)	3:57
16.	"The Edge of Glory" (Desi Hits! Bollywood remix)	5:13
Total length:		80:13

== Personnel ==
Credits and personnel adapted from Born This Way: The Remix liner notes and AllMusic.

- DJ Aqeel – additional production, remixing
- Dick Beetham – mastering
- Svein Berge – additional production, remixing
- Torbjørn Brundtland – additional production, remixing
- Julien Carret – mixing
- Troy Carter – management
- Foster the People – remixing
- Goldfrapp – remixing
- Guéna LG – additional production, remixing
- Vincent Herbert – A&R, executive producer
- The Horrors – remixing
- Hurts – remixing
- Illangelo – remixing
- Lady Gaga – arranger, producer, vocals
- Fernando Garibay – producer
- Gregori Klosman – remix producer
- Robert John "Mutt" Lange – producer
- Jepper Laursen – writing, producer
- Patrick Mascall – guitar
- Joseph Mount – additional production, remixing
- RedOne – composer, producer
- Ned Shepard – remix producer
- Sultan Shepard – remix producer
- Clinton Sparks – producer
- Mark Taylor – additional production, remixing, keyboards, programming
- Twin Shadow – remix producer
- Two Door Cinema Club – remixing
- The Weeknd – remixing, background vocals
- DJ White Shadow – producer
- Wild Beasts – additional production, remixing
- Michael Woods – additional production, keyboards, remixing
- Zedd – remix producer, mixing

== Charts ==
=== Weekly charts ===
Weekly chart performance for Born This Way: The Remix
Chart (2011)	Peak position
Australian Albums Chart	62
Belgian Heatseekers Albums Chart (Flanders)	4
Belgian Albums Chart (Wallonia)	69
Canadian Albums Chart	49
French Albums Chart	71
Greek Albums Chart	51
Italian Albums Chart	89
Japanese Albums Chart	14
Scottish Albums (Official Charts)	66
Spanish Albums Chart	41
UK Albums Chart	77
US Billboard 200	105
US Dance/Electronic Albums	3

=== Year-end charts ===
2012 year-end chart performance for Born This Way: The Remix
Chart (2012)	Position
US Dance/Electronic Albums (Billboard)	20

== Certifications and sales ==
Certifications and sales for Born This Way: The Remix
Region	Certification	Certified units/sales
Japan (RIAJ)	Gold	100,000^{^}
^{^} Shipments figures based on certification alone.

== Release history ==
Release dates and formats for Born This Way: The Remix
Region	Date	Format	Label	Edition	Catalog
Colombia	November 18, 2011	CD	Universal Music International, Interscope Records	Standard	602527870007
Germany	November 18, 2011	CD, digital download	Universal Music International, Interscope Records	Standard	B005SV9W4Q
United States	November 21, 2011	CD, digital download	Streamline, Interscope, and Konlive	Standard	B005SV9W4Q
United Kingdom	November 21, 2011	CD, digital download	Polydor Records	Standard	B005SV9W4Q
Japan	November 21, 2011	CD, digital download	Interscope	Standard	B005SV9W4Q
France	November 21, 2011	CD, digital download	Interscope	Standard	B005SV9W4Q
Japan	November 23, 2011	CD	Universal International	Limited	B005SUI4Z0
United States	December 6, 2011	LP	Streamline, Interscope, KonLive	Standard	B005ZN2I66
Germany	December 6, 2011	LP	Universal Music Group, Interscope	Standard	B005ZN2I66
United Kingdom	December 6, 2011	LP	Universal Music Group, Interscope	Standard	B005ZN2I66
Japan	December 6, 2011	LP	Universal Music Group, Interscope	Standard	B005ZN2I66
Indonesia	December 14, 2011	CD	Universal Music Indonesia	Standard	Unknown catalog
China	March 29, 2012	CD	STARSING CULTURE	Standard	9787888801011
