= Bloody Mary (song) =

2022 single by Lady Gaga

Single by Lady Gaga

from the album Born This Way
- Released: December 2, 2022
- Recorded: 2010
- Studio: Studios 301 (Sydney)
- Genre: Electropop
- Length: 4:05
- Label: Streamline; KonLive; Interscope
- Songwriters: Lady Gaga; Fernando Garibay; Paul Blair aka DJ White Shadow
- Producers: Lady Gaga; Paul Blair aka DJ White Shadow

Lady Gaga singles chronology
"Hold My Hand" (2022)	"Bloody Mary" (2022)	"Sweet Sounds of Heaven" (2023)

Audio video
- "Bloody Mary" on YouTube

"Bloody Mary" is a song by American singer Lady Gaga recorded for her second studio album Born This Way (2011). Gaga wrote the song with Fernando Garibay and Paul "DJ White Shadow" Blair; it was produced by Gaga and DJ White Shadow, with co-production by Garibay and Clinton Sparks. "Bloody Mary" is an electropop song with elements of synth-pop and trance, and features Gregorian chants. Although the song's title is an epithet mostly associated with the English queen Mary Tudor, Gaga assumes the role of biblical figure Mary Magdalene in its lyrics, whom she considered a "feminine force" she had worshiped since her childhood in a Catholic girls school. It is one of several tracks on the album with religious themes.

Critical reception towards "Bloody Mary" was generally positive; reviewers called it "gothic" and "spooky", and highlighted its production values. Gaga's first live performance of the song was at her 2012–2013 Born This Way Ball concert tour, where she was seen "floating" above stage in a white outfit with two similarly dressed dancers. During the Joanne World Tour (2017–2018), she wore a bold red puffer coat and eye mask for the performance. In 2025–2026, Gaga opened several of her concerts with the song. English rock band the Horrors remixed "Bloody Mary" for Gaga's second remix album Born This Way: The Remix (2011).

In 2022, following the release of the Netflix comedy horror series Wednesday, the titular character's dance and its fan recreations to a sped-up version of the song went viral on video sharing service TikTok. This resulted in a large increase in plays of the song on Spotify, and "Bloody Mary" was sent to French and Italian radio as the album's sixth single in December 2022, eleven years after the release of Born This Way. The following month, it was also sent to US pop and adult contemporary radios. After being released as a single, the song charted in Europe and North America; it reached the top 40 on the singles charts of several nations including Italy, Germany, Sweden, Switzerland, and the United Kingdom; and the top 10 on the pop and hot adult contemporary radio formats in the United States.

== Background and development ==
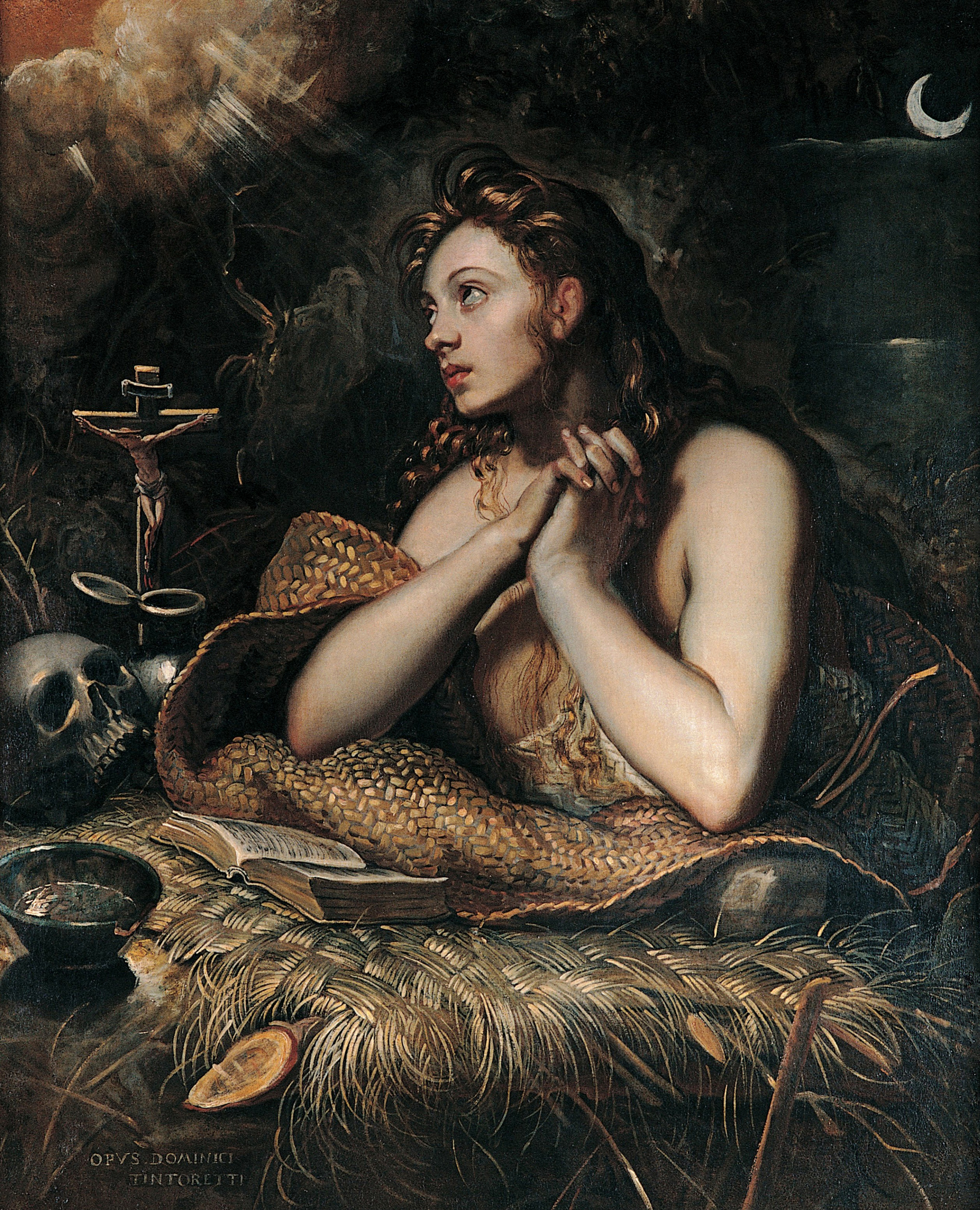
Biblical figure Mary Magdalene served as inspiration for the song.

On May 23, 2011, Lady Gaga released her second studio album, Born This Way. One of the record's main lyrical topic is religion; several of the songs, such as "Judas"—the album's second single—and "Bloody Mary", make references to Christianity. In the latter, Gaga assumes the role of Mary Magdalene, who witnessed the crucifixion of Jesus. NME described "Bloody Mary" as a "serene flipside" to "Judas", using another biblical character "to do much the same job". The song's title is an epithet that is mostly associated with Mary I of England and a ghostly figure in folklore and urban legends. Gaga, however, took inspiration from Mary Magdalene, to whom she refers on social media as "the ultimate rockstar's girlfriend"; she also said the song is "about living halfway between reality and fantasy".

In an interview with Popjustice, after being asked about her fascination with Magdalene and the song's origins, Gaga discussed her upbringing in a Catholic girl school. Although she was instructed to pray to God and Jesus, Gaga found it easier to worship "a more feminine force" in her life, and she decided to pray to women—Mother Mary or Mary Magdelene, or her late aunt Joanne, (Note: Joanne Stefani Germanotta was Gaga's aunt on her father's side who died at age 19 due to complications arising from lupus. She later inspired Gaga in writing her 2016 album, Joanne.) who she believed became an angel working beside God. Since becoming a pop singer, Gaga found strength by praying to them. She also talked about how "women were always the target", being stoned for "adultery or for doing inappropriate things" in biblical times, which made her think about her faith to make herself brave while creating Born This Way. She said the song's lyrics were written from the point of view of Magdalene:

The lyrics are Mary sort of talking ... If you listen to the lyrics and the way the cadence goes, the way I'm actually singing, I start quite sweetly then I go into these quite demonic tones, then I come back to sweetness, and then the chorus is me ultimately, publicly singing, "I won't cry for you, I won't crucify the things you do, I won't cry for you when you're gone I'll still be Bloody Mary". I'll still bleed, is what I'm trying to say. I guess I'm fascinated by her. ... In my belief Mary was in it all along. I think she knew what was going to happen. But I also believe that she loved him, and I believe there was a moment when she cried. So she says 'I won't cry for you' but in the rest of the song, in the way that it feels, it's sad and ... [it sounds] like a death dirge ... There's that kind of quality to it. It's about me having to be a superstar.

Talking with NME, Gaga also alluded to Mary Magdelene as a superstar, who "must have cried too". According to Gaga, Magdalene "was both fully divine and fully human. She has to be strong when Jesus fulfills the prophecy to die for everyone's sins, but she still has the moment of humanity where she's upset to let him go." In a Twitter post, Gaga cited her red Rolls-Royce Corniche III car, which she bought in 2009, as another inspiration for the song. It was her only car at that time, and she called it "Bloody Mary".

=== Thematic analysis ===
According to Sean Adams of Drowned in Sound, part of Gaga's "charm" is the way she contrives a "grand historical context for herself", and listed "Bloody Mary" in a line of songs from Born This Way which "finds her setting up her stall alongside monarchs and martyrs"; "Government Hooker", "Black Jesus + Amen Fashion" and "Judas" being other examples. Ann Powers from NPR said an overarching theme of the album is revisiting "demons every feminist artist has faced", such as Christianity, with "Bloody Mary". Vulture, an online blog associated with New York Magazine, said Gaga is "casting Mary as a graceful, eternal icon of feminine suffering", adding the track "could be sacrilegious, but like in The Last Temptation of Christ, humanizing icons only makes them more relatable". In an article by American Songwriter, Alex Hopper said Gaga as Magdelene "chooses to focus on the love he spread in the world as opposed to the tragedy before her. Despite her grief, she promises to pick up that mantle and spread love in her own way: drying her tears and dancing through the night."

== Recording and composition ==
"Bloody Mary"
A 27-second sample of "Bloody Mary". It portrays the end of the chorus and Gaga's screaming resembling a "death metal vocal bit", along with the "monkish" choir repeatedly chanting "GA-GA".

"Bloody Mary" was written by Gaga, Fernando Garibay, and Paul "DJ White Shadow" Blair, and produced by Gaga and Blair with additional co-production by Garibay and Clinton Sparks. The song began as a demo Blair made in Sydney's Studios 301. Gaga played it to Garibay while they were in Australia, and they then "put their stamp on the song" in his studio in Los Angeles, where Gaga finalized many tracks for Born This Way. Garibay noted they only polished the song by adding a few parts and that the album version is not far from the demo.

It is a slow-tempo electropop and dark pop track that contains "plucked strings" and "filthy beats", and a "synthy tune" with elements of trance. The song includes "warped vocal effects" and Gregorian chants, with a "highly computerized", monk-like chorus repeatedly chanting "GA-GA" "before it’s glitched in a euphoric beatdown". Parts of the lyrics are sung in French and Spanish. Gaga's "pained shouts of 'LOVE!'" in the track resemble a "death metal vocal bit". Her vocals range from E_{3} to C_{5}. NME described "Bloody Mary" as a "dark, pulsing and atmospheric, almost funereal electroballad" while Vulture branded it an "electropop opera". According to MuuMuse's Bradley Stern, the song invokes "David Bowie's space-pop". Glamour columnist Jenn Selby found it one of the tracks on Born This Way that have "the unmistakable mark of Madonna". The Independent's Andy Gill said the "monkish vocoder-chanting ... recalls Romanian techno-classicist Enigma". Rolling Stone's Rob Sheffield noted the song for its "Chic bassline".

== Critical reception ==
NME's Dan Martin picked "Bloody Mary" as one of the highlights of Born This Way, calling it "a classy, graceful moment on an album not exactly pre-occupied with being either classy or graceful". Robert Copsey of Digital Spy found it a "decadent number with the same ecclesiastical tone as 'Judas'—though unlike its cousin, it doesn't try to be anything other than graceful and effortless pop". Owen Myers from Pitchfork highlighted the song's Gregorian chants as some of the album's "enjoyably over-the-top gothic flourishes". Writing for The Telegraph, Neil McCormick called "Bloody Mary" a "sweet love song", noting "an elegant almost ethereal melody flows gently even as choirs of monks intone 'Ga Ga'". Caryn Ganz from Spin called the song "hypnotically sleazy". A Vulture article found "Blood Mary" a "ruthlessly danceable" track.

Prefixmag's Craig Jenkins said "the somewhat sedate" song, along with album tracks "Scheiße" and "Government Hooker" "cuts the karaoke crap and kicks ass on the dance floor" and "eschew[s] Born This Way's time traveling ethos in favor of a more modern approach". Adam White of The Independent praised "Bloody Mary", writing; "Great production, beautiful production. Amid the howling, echoes and general spookiness here, there are two lines in which Gaga's vocals appear to melt and curdle, and it's sort of brilliant." The Boston Globe's James Reed said the track "trims some of the production fat, and even with its pseudo-religious premise ... it's refreshing to hear Gaga retreat into the song's sensuality". In a retrospective review in 2021, Bianca Gracie of Uproxx described "Bloody Mary" as "one of the most sonically wicked tunes" in Gaga's catalogue.

Rolling Stone's Jody Rosen was less positive, highlighting the song's "sluggish tempo, goofy 'goth' atmospherics and a lyric that sounds like bad high school poetry: 'We are not just art for Michaelangelo [sic] to carve/He can't rewrite the agro of my furied heart'." At Drowned in Sound, Sean Adams called the "oddly plodding" song one of the album's fillers. According to Evan Sawdey of PopMatters; "despite its fancy string-pluck opening, 'Bloody Mary' is a remarkably average club track (save its liquid bass line), playing its religious angle very heavily but without much payoff".

== Single release and media appearances ==
In November 2022, "Bloody Mary" went viral after a sped-up version was used in videos on TikTok depicting Wednesday Addams's (Jenna Ortega) dance in the Netflix television series Wednesday and its fan recreations. The videos originated from a clip of Addams dancing to the Cramps' 1981 song "Goo Goo Muck", but with the audio replaced with "Bloody Mary". This quickly caused a massive spike in the song's streams, and on December 2, 2022, it was sent to French radio as a single, and was released as a single in Italy on December 23. On January 17, 2023, the song was sent to US pop radio, and to adult contemporary stations on January 30. On March 15, 2023, Interscope released "Bloody Mary" on vinyl record with some of the lyrics etched into the surface, followed by a CD release on May 5. Another twelve-inch vinyl version titled "Glow in the Dark" was released for Halloween of 2023.

On TikTok, Gaga later posted a black-and-white video in which she recreates the viral dance wearing goth makeup and an outfit similar to the one worn by Wednesday in the show. The sped-up version of "Bloody Mary" was featured in Netflix's teaser for season two of Wednesday. Gaga herself was the special guest for the Wednesday-themed final part of Netflix's June 2025 live company Tudum event in Los Angeles’ Kia Forum, where she performed a medley of selected songs and danced along as "Bloody Mary" was played.

== Commercial performance ==
Following the song's initial release as part of its parent album in May 2011, "Bloody Mary" reached number one on Lebanon's Top 20 Airplay chart, being its only chart appearance. According to Billboard, "Bloody Mary" was gradually building up worldwide streams since August 18, 2022, when it garnered 561,000 streams.

In the first week of the track's surge, which began two days after the premiere of Wednesday on November 23, 2022, and ended on December 1, "Bloody Mary" was streamed 1.8 million times, gaining 509% in official, on-demand streams and 1,133% in sales. The week after, it gained 144% in streams and 201% in sales, debuting at 168 on the Billboard Global Excl. US chart, a version of the Global 200 chart that does not include the United States. The percentage of the song's rise in the two weeks following the initial surge was 537% in streams and 144% in sales globally, and 412% and 140% in the US. It later entered the top 40 on both charts, peaking at 31 on the Global 200 and at 28 on the Excl. US chart. After initially failing to enter the Billboard Hot 100 chart due to the popularity of Christmas songs at the time of its initial surge, "Bloody Mary" debuted at 68 on the chart on the issue dated January 14, 2023. The song initially climbed to 54 and fluctuated before reaching a new peak of 41 in its twelfth week on the chart. It also reached 23 on the Billboard Adult Contemporary chart, 10 on the Billboard Mainstream Top 40 chart, and three on the Billboard Adult Top 40 chart. The track outperformed prior Born This Way singles "Judas" and "Marry the Night" on US radio, becoming the album's fourth track to hit the top 10 on US pop radio nearly 12 years after its release. As of April 2023, the song has received 166 million official on-demand streams and sold 92,000 digital copies in the United States, according to Luminate. In Canada, "Bloody Mary" has been certified Gold by Music Canada for selling at least 40,000 units. The song debuted on the Billboard Canadian Hot 100 at 74 on the chart dated December 17, 2022. After fluctuating on the chart for five weeks, the song rose to its current peak of 50 in its seventh week on the chart. Despite the song never entering the charts in Australia, it was certified platinum by the ARIA for moving at least 70,000 units.

"Bloody Mary" entered various music charts throughout Europe following its release as a single. The song appeared on the UK Singles Chart on December 16, 2022 at 57; it remained in the top 75 for the following two weeks and reached the top 40 at 22 in its fourth week on the chart, becoming the seventh track from Born This Way to reach the top 40, eleven years after the release of the previous single "Marry the Night". In July 2024, the single was certified Gold in the country for moving at least 400,000 units. In Italy, one of the first countries in which the song was officially sent to radio, "Bloody Mary" debuted at 87 on the Top 100 Singles chart. In its fifth week, the song reached 20. Later, "Bloody Mary" was certified Gold in Italy for selling at least 50,000 units. In Greece, the song peaked at number ten on the IFPI's International Digital Singles chart and was certified Gold for reaching 1,000,000 streams in the country alone. The song reached the top 40 on other European singles charts, including 31 on the German Singles Chart, 30 on the Swedish Singles Chart, 29 on the Swiss Singles chart, 23 on the Finnish Songs Chart, five on Hungary's Top 40 Singles chart, and two on Poland's Airplay Top 100 chart.

== Remixes ==
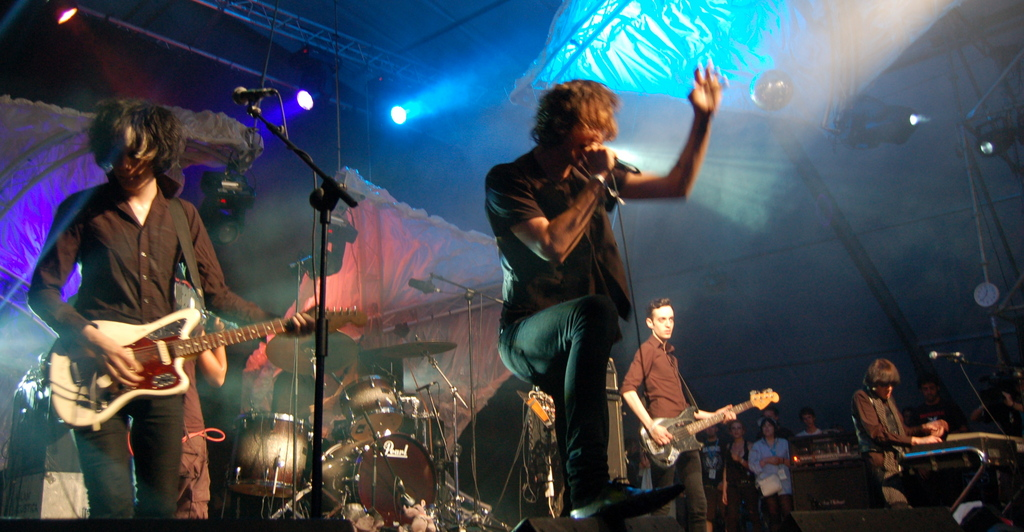
The Horrors' take on the track appears on Born This Way: The Remix (2011).

On November 18, 2011, Gaga released her second remix album Born This Way: The Remix, which includes a remix of "Bloody Mary" by English rock band the Horrors. In an album review by Billboard, the remix was called "a lush, haunting affair, with Gaga lost in the darkness of the dance floor". Stephen Thomas Erlewine of AllMusic listed the track as one of the album's highlights. Nick Levine of BBC Music said the remix turned "Bloody Mary" into a "vampire disco floor-filler". Exclaim!'s Sarah Murphy called it an "eerie" rendition in which "the gothy British shoegazers slow the track down and add their signature air of creepiness to it". Chris Eggersten of Uproxx said it is "a pretty bold reinvention of the song (almost all of Gaga's lyrics have been discarded)", describing it as a "moody, almost meditative spin to the original track".

In 2012, Clinton Sparks, one of the producers of the original version of "Bloody Mary", independently issued his own remix of the song, which is a dance club version that is "full of raw, industrial thumping bass, groaning synths ... and a twirling tempo". In 2023, he released a new remix of the song that was co-produced with Disco Fries.

== Live performances ==
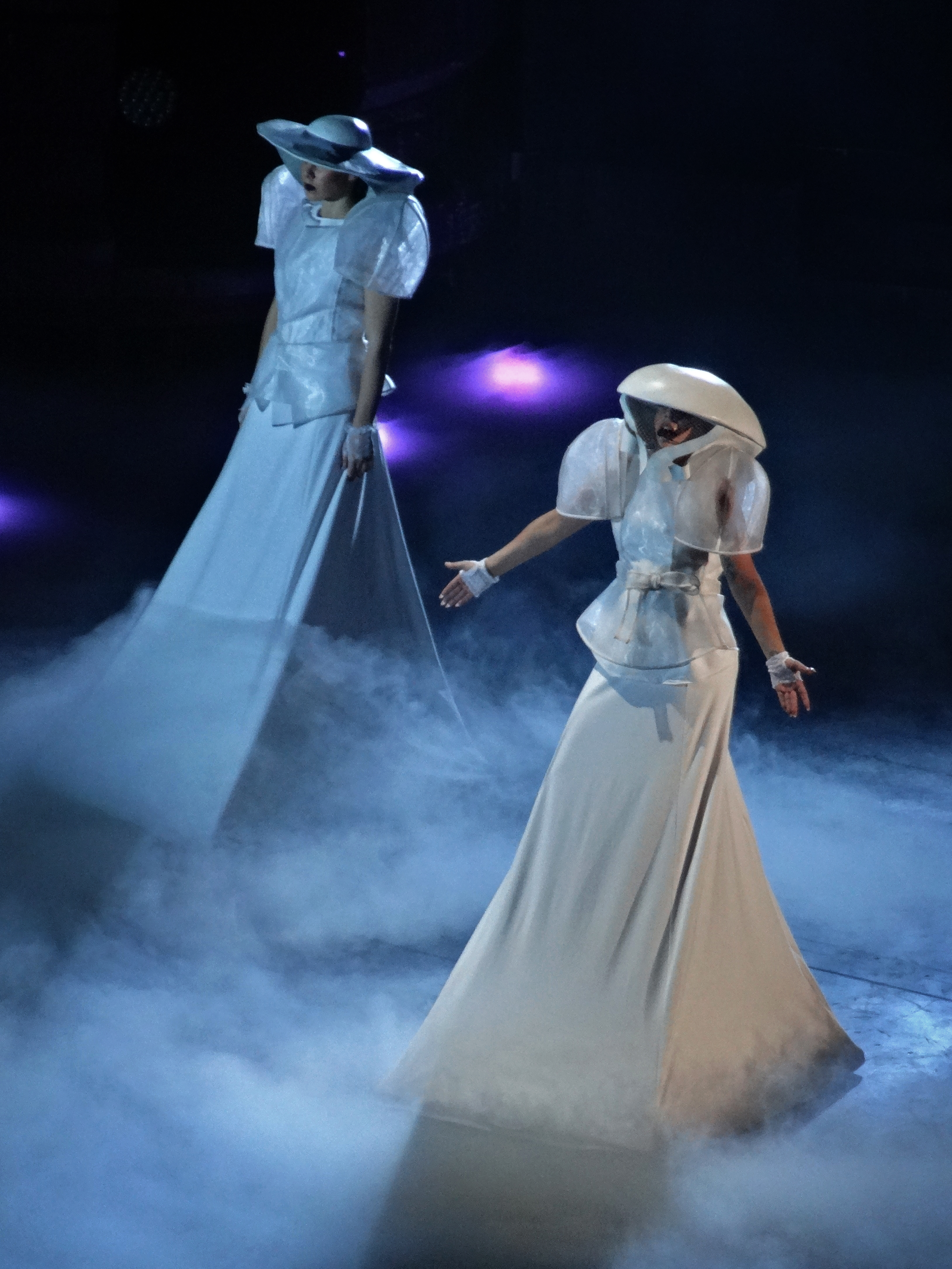
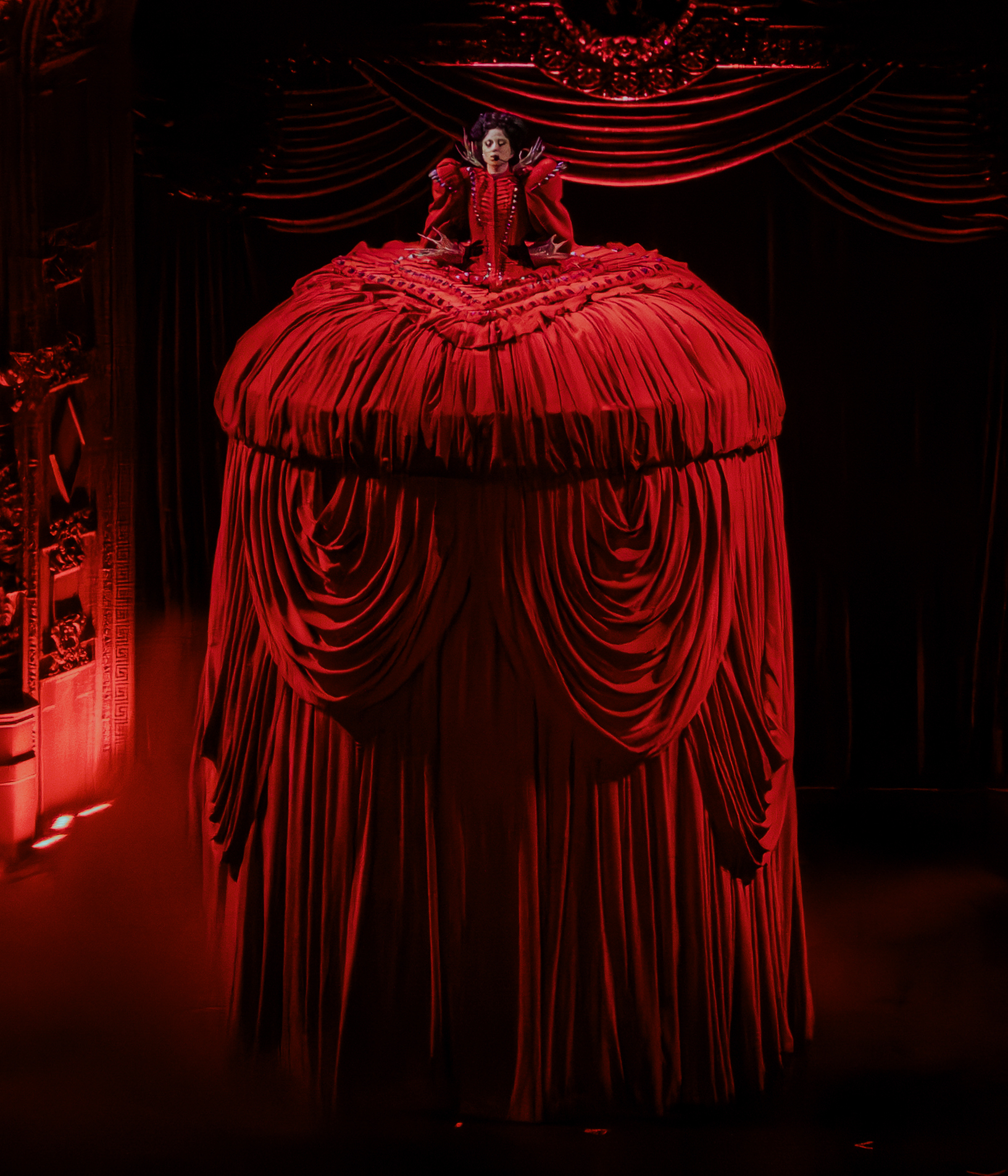
Gaga performing "Bloody Mary" in 2012 and 2025, during her Born This Way Ball and Mayhem Ball tours (pictured left to right)

Gaga performed "Bloody Mary" during her third headlining concert tour, the Born This Way Ball (2012–2013). She wore a white dress and helmet, and appeared with two female dancers who were dressed in the same outfit. The three women moved around a circular runway on remote-controlled platforms, creating an illusion of the performers floating above the stage. Gaga's male dancers wearing miniskirts followed them. The Line of Best Fit's Charlie Ivens said Gaga appeared as a "cosmic beekeeper" during the "absurdly bouncable beats" of the song. According to Chase Wade of The Dallas Morning News; "'Bloody Mary' unnerved as she delivered operatic vocals in an all-white gown while gliding like some kind of automaton bride".

"Bloody Mary" was also included on the set list of Gaga's fifth headlining concert tour, the Joanne World Tour (2017–2018). During the show, she performed the song wearing a bold red Norma Kamali "sleeping bag" puffer coat with a 10-foot (3.0 m)-long train and an eye mask. She was accompanied by her dancers wearing outfits in matching colors. Lauren Alexis Fisher of Harper's Bazaar said the singer brought back "the avant garde looks she's always embraced" with the outfit, following a more-stripped-down era in her career. Mikael Wood from the Los Angeles Times said Gaga's "Bloody Mary" performance "had the look of a spirited satanic orgy", and noted it provided "the elaborate set pieces her fans expect". According to Tom Murray from the Edmonton Journal, during the song, Gaga's dancers were "tumbling after her like the asylum inmates in Marat Sade".

In 2025, Gaga performed a set of promotional concerts for Mayhem, including a headlining set at Coachella 2025, where "Bloody Mary" was the opening song. She appeared on stage in an enormous crimson-color hoop skirt–reminiscent of the Tudor era– that stretched three stories high. The dress was later revealed to conceal a birdcage with her backup dancers locked inside.

== Credits and personnel ==
Credits adapted from the liner notes of Born This Way.

- Lady Gaga – vocals, songwriter, producer, background vocals
- DJ White Shadow – songwriter, producer, programming, keyboards
- Fernando Garibay – songwriter, co-producer, programming, keyboards
- Clinton Sparks – co-producer, keyboards
- Kamau Georges – programming
- Bill Malina – audio engineering
- Dave Russell – recording at Studio 301, Sydney, Australia; audio mixing at The Mix Room, Burbank, California
- Chris Gehringer – audio mastering at Sterling Sound, New York City
- Paul Pavao – assistant
- Jordan Power – assistant

== Charts ==
=== Weekly charts ===
2011 weekly chart performance for "Bloody Mary"
Chart (2011)	Peak position
Lebanon (Lebanese Top 20)	1

2022–2023 weekly chart performance for "Bloody Mary"
Chart (2022–2023)	Peak position
Austria (Ö3 Austria Top 40)	32
Canada Hot 100 (Billboard)	50
Canada CHR/Top 40 (Billboard)	32
Canada Hot AC (Billboard)	21
Czech Republic Singles Digital (ČNS IFPI)	9
Finland (Billboard)	23
France (SNEP)	43
Germany (GfK)	31
Global 200 (Billboard)	31
Greece International (IFPI)	10
Hungary (Dance Top 40)	4
Hungary (Rádiós Top 40)	6
Hungary (Single Top 40)	5
Hungary (Stream Top 40)	14
Ireland (IRMA)	80
Italy (FIMI)	20
Latvia Streaming (LAIPA)	11
Lebanon (Lebanese Top 20)	20
Lithuania (AGATA)	1
Luxembourg (Billboard)	24
Netherlands (Single Top 100)	97
Poland (Polish Airplay Top 100)	2
Poland (Polish Streaming Top 100)	15
Portugal (AFP)	60
San Marino Airplay (SMRTV Top 50)	3
Slovakia Airplay (ČNS IFPI)	76
Slovakia Singles Digital (ČNS IFPI)	12
South Korea Download (Circle)	134
Spain (PROMUSICAE)	96
Sweden (Sverigetopplistan)	30
Switzerland (Schweizer Hitparade)	29
UK Singles (Official Charts)	22
US Billboard Hot 100	41
US Adult Contemporary (Billboard)	21
US Adult Pop Airplay (Billboard)	3
US Dance Airplay (Billboard)	31
US Pop Airplay (Billboard)	10
Venezuela (Record Report)	48

=== Year-end charts ===
2023 year-end chart performance for "Bloody Mary"
Chart (2023)	Position
Global 200 (Billboard)	167
Hungary (Dance Top 40)	11
Hungary (Rádiós Top 40)	29
Poland (Polish Airplay Top 100)	27
US Billboard Hot 100	99
US Adult Contemporary (Billboard)	47
US Adult Top 40 (Billboard)	22
US Pop Airplay (Billboard)	35

2024 year-end chart performance for "Bloody Mary"
Chart (2024)	Position
Hungary (Dance Top 40)	64
Hungary (Rádiós Top 40)	57

2025 year-end chart performance for "Bloody Mary"
Chart (2025)	Position
Hungary (Rádiós Top 40)	94

== Certifications and sales ==
Certifications and sales for "Bloody Mary"
Region	Certification	Certified units/sales
Australia (ARIA)	Platinum	70,000^{‡}
Austria (IFPI Austria)	Gold	15,000^{*}
Brazil (Pro-Música Brasil)	3× Platinum	180,000^{‡}
Canada (Music Canada)	Gold	40,000^{‡}
Italy (FIMI)	Platinum	100,000^{‡}
New Zealand (RMNZ)	Gold	15,000^{‡}
Poland (ZPAV)	Platinum	50,000^{‡}
Spain (Promusicae)	Gold	30,000^{‡}
United Kingdom (BPI)	Platinum	600,000^{‡}
United States	—	92,000
Streaming
Greece (IFPI Greece)	Gold	1,000,000^{†}
^{*} Sales figures based on certification alone.^{‡} Sales+streaming figures based on certification alone.^{†} Streaming-only figures based on certification alone.

== Release history ==
Release dates and formats for "Bloody Mary"
Region	Date	Format(s)	Label	Ref.
France	December 2, 2022	Radio airplay	Universal	
Italy	December 23, 2022	Radio airplay	Universal	
United States	January 17, 2023	Contemporary hit radio	Interscope	
United States	January 30, 2023	Adult contemporary radio; hot AC radio; modern AC radio	Interscope	
United States	March 15, 2023	Twelve-inch vinyl	Interscope	
Germany	March 24, 2023	Twelve-inch vinyl	Universal	
Japan	March 31, 2023	Twelve-inch vinyl	Universal	
Canada	April 14, 2023	Twelve-inch vinyl	Interscope	
United Kingdom	April 24, 2023	Twelve-inch vinyl	Polydor	
United States	May 5, 2023	CD	Interscope	
Germany	May 12, 2023	CD	Universal	
United States	May 12, 2023	Digital download	Interscope	
Brazil	July 14, 2023	Twelve-inch vinyl	Universal	
Germany	October 31, 2023	Twelve-inch vinyl (Glow in the Dark edition)	Universal	
Italy	October 31, 2023	Twelve-inch vinyl (Glow in the Dark edition)	Universal	
United States	October 31, 2023	Twelve-inch vinyl (Glow in the Dark edition)	Interscope	
United States	November 11, 2023	Twelve-inch picture disc vinyl	Interscope	
Brazil	January 26, 2024	Twelve-inch vinyl (Glow in the Dark edition)	Universal	
