= Lady Gaga Presents the Monster Ball Tour: At Madison Square Garden =

2011 concert film

- DVD and Blu-ray cover
- Genre: Concert
- Directed by: Laurieann Gibson
- Starring: Lady Gaga
- Country of origin: United States

Production
- Executive producers: Lady Gaga; Troy Carter; Vincent Herbert; Jimmy Iovine; Mo Morrison
- Producers: Steven Johnson; Nicole Ehrlich
- Editors: Michael Polito; Bill DeRonde; Kevin O'Dea; Katie Hetland
- Running time: 114 minutes
- Production companies: Mermaid Films; HBO Documentary Films; Media Blasters

Original release
- Network: HBO
- Release: May 7, 2011

Lady Gaga Presents the Monster Ball Tour: At Madison Square Garden is a 2011 concert special which documents the February 21 and 22, 2011 shows of American singer Lady Gaga's worldwide concert tour, the Monster Ball Tour. Filmed at Madison Square Garden in Gaga's hometown of New York City, the two-hour special was produced by HBO. It was first broadcast on the channel on May 7, 2011, a day after Gaga's last date of The Monster Ball Tour. The special was released on November 21, 2011, on DVD and Blu-ray by Media Blasters.

Lady Gaga Presents the Monster Ball Tour: At Madison Square Garden features concert footage as well as pre-concert and backstage content. The special received critical acclaim; critics praised Gaga's performance and the onstage theatrics while expressing doubt in Gaga's sincerity during her monologues and in pre-concert scenes. When aired, the special was watched by 1.2 million viewers and was nominated for five awards at the 63rd Primetime Emmy Awards, winning one for Outstanding Picture Editing for a Special (Single or Multi-Camera).

The video album released for the special includes extra footage like a capella performances and a photo gallery. The 5.1 surround sound of the release utilized DTS-HD Master Audio and new technology to provide the viewer an optimum experience of watching the live concert. Emphasis was given on the main music and the vocals sung during the concert, while adjusting them against the screaming and the cheering of the crowd. The release was a commercial success, reaching the top of the music DVD charts in the United States, France and Italy and the top-ten in other nations. It received double Platinum certifications in Australia and France, while in the United Kingdom, it was certified Gold.

== Background ==
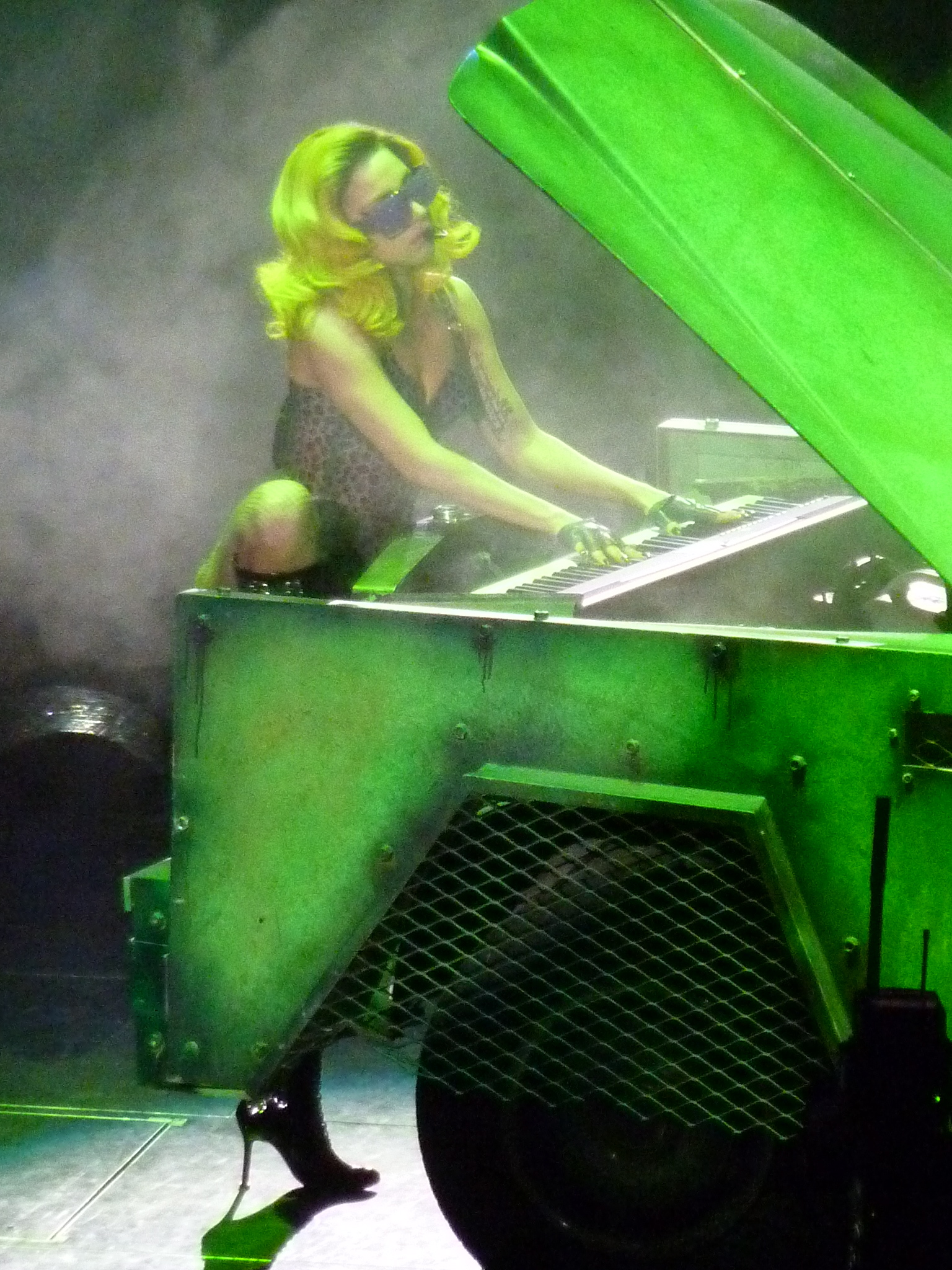
Lady Gaga during The Monster Ball Tour

The Monster Ball Tour was the second worldwide concert tour by Lady Gaga. Staged in support of her EP The Fame Monster (2009) and comprising a set list of songs from the EP and her debut album The Fame (2008), the tour visited arenas and stadiums from 2009 through 2011. Described as "the first-ever pop electro opera" by Gaga, the tour was announced in October 2009 after an intended joint concert tour with hip-hop artist Kanye West was suddenly canceled. The tour commenced four days after the release of The Fame Monster in November 2009. A revision of the tour occurred after only a few months of performances, due to Gaga's concern that the original version was constructed within a very short span of time. The stage of the original show looked like a frame, comparable to that of a hollowed-out television set.

Since The Fame Monster dealt with the paranoias Gaga had faced, the main theme of the original shows became human evolution, while elements of the canceled tour with West were still included in some parts. From 2010 onward, the revamped shows had a New York theme and portrayed a story set in the city, where Gaga and her friends got lost and had to find their way to "the Monster Ball". Both versions of the show were divided into five segments, with the last being the encore. Each of them featured Gaga in new outfits, singing songs related to the concept of the segment, as they were followed by a video interlude.

The tour received general critical acclaim, with critics praising Gaga's singing abilities, the theatricality of the show, and her sense of style and fashion. The Monster Ball was a commercial success, with sold-out shows and demand for tickets prompting organizers to add more dates to the itinerary. It ultimately grossed an estimated $227.4 million ($325 million in 2025 dollars) from 200 reported shows and an audience of 2.5 million. At the 2010 Billboard Touring Awards, Gaga won the Breakthrough Performer Award, as well as the Concert Marketing and Promotion Award, the latter being an acknowledgment of her partnership with sponsor Virgin Mobile.

== Content ==
The special opens with a black-and-white introduction with a man running that sees Gaga ordering a cup of coffee from a New York convenience store before being escorted by security into a black SUV, where she reminisces about the many times she had been at the arena to watch other acts perform, and realizes that she will now be performing there herself. After being escorted backstage, she removes her makeup and cries as she discusses feeling like a "loser". She then sings the opening lines of "Marry the Night" while preparing to take the stage. Technicolor footage of the concert (shot on February 21 and 22, 2011) is then seen, interspersed with black-and-white backstage footage. The special ends with another black-and-white backstage scene where Gaga and her backup singers perform "Born This Way" a cappella.

== Release and reception ==
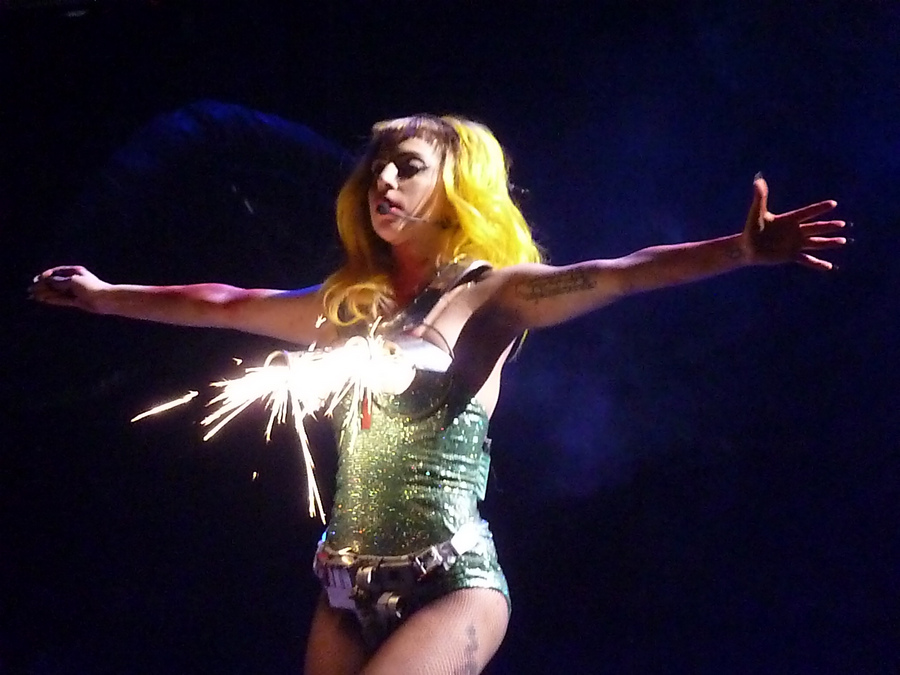
Linda Stassi from New York Post complimented the pyrotechnic bra worn by Gaga on the tour (pictured).

Lady Gaga Presents the Monster Ball Tour: At Madison Square Garden was filmed at Madison Square Garden in Gaga's hometown of New York City, the two-hour special produced by HBO, with the first broadcast on the channel on May 7, 2011, a day after Gaga's last date of The Monster Ball Tour. A teaser for the special was released ahead of its broadcast, while promotional artwork showed Gaga wearing her characteristic pyrotechnic bra emitting sparks. According to Billboard, the special was watched by 1.2 million viewers.

The special received critical acclaim. On review aggregate website Metacritic, the special holds a rating of 81 out of 100 based on four critic reviews, indicating "universal acclaim". Jed Gottlieb of the Boston Herald wrote, "[B]etween the orgy of visuals—stripper strobes, androgynous dancers and a very loose, X-rated 'Wizard of Oz' theme—we get some great song and dance numbers: 'Poker Face', 'Paparazzi' and 'Bad Romance'. These are amazing hits, club-thumping tracks that define joy and sadness for a generation of suburban teens and the urban disenfranchised." However, he felt that the show's non-concert content was not genuine, and found the special to be similar to Madonna's 1991 documentary Madonna: Truth or Dare. The A.V. Club's Genevieve Koski gave the special a B+ rating, claiming that Gaga "proves that she is a performer" and that "she puts on a show", though she felt that the concert was overly emotional and artistically ambitious, and that Gaga's on-stage banter was slightly annoying. Koski also compared the special to the Madonna documentary. Linda Stassi from New York Post was also positive in her assessment of the concert special. She complimented the behind the scenes footage, the costumes and the dancing and the pyrotechnics of the show, describing it as "a concert that would make Madonna's shows look like run-of-the-mill dinner theater."

Paul Schrodt of Slant Magazine was more critical in his review, though he gave it a 2.5 star (out of 4) rating. While he positively called Gaga's performances outrageous and "occasionally fierce", he questioned Gaga's authenticity, both on stage and in the pre-concert scenes. Ultimately, he wrote, "Unsurprisingly, HBO's Lady Gaga Presents the Monster Ball Tour: At Madison Square Garden raises more questions about Stefani Germanotta (Gaga's birth name) than it answers, which is probably as it should be." Radio host Howard Stern also compared the black-and-white scenes of the special to Madonna: Truth or Dare, adding that when he darts a glance at Lady Gaga, she is occasionally registered in his brain as Madonna. On his show, Stern was also critical of inappropriateness and unreasonability of the numerous speeches Gaga gave between the songs in the special, calling them "prattle", "drivel", and "condescending". Dedicating over half an hour of his show on May 9 and 10, 2011, to express his criticism of the concert, Stern compared the manner of Gaga's speaking to professional wrestling due to echoing, Gaga's gasping between the words, and the audience's arguable inability to hear the words enough to understand them. In particular, Gaga claimed in the concert that her incentive to work is to "set [her audience] free", not money. Stern attempted to debunk that claim by arguing that Gaga takes potentially psychiatric problems of her audience lightly by urging her fans to "forget all of [their] insecurities" overnight.

The special received five nominations at the 63rd Primetime Emmy Awards. It was nominated for Outstanding Variety, Music or Comedy Special; Outstanding Directing for a Variety, Music or Comedy Special; Outstanding Technical Direction, Camerawork, Video Control for a Miniseries, Movie or a Special; Outstanding Picture Editing for a Special (Single or Multi-Camera); and Outstanding Lighting Design/Lighting Direction for a Variety, Music or Comedy Special. It won the picture editing award and lost all of its other bids. The five nominations were among the 104 HBO received for 2011; it made up over one-fifth of the total nominations. The special also received a nomination at the 2012 Dorian Awards in the TV Musical Program of the Year category, while winning Best Westen Music Video at the 2013 Japan Gold Disc Awards.

== Video album ==
=== Development ===
Because of the aggressive lighting scheme a lot of the action dissolves into posterizing on several occasions. This same aggressive lighting scheme also results in noticeable banding, as well as some heavily blooming whites. If you can overlook this issues, though, the rest of this concert looks fantastic ... The arena noises are well modulated and aren't too distracting from the music onstage, and hall ambience is really well rendered on the 5.1 track. There's really some surprising clarity in the multi-layered band accompaniment here.

— Kauffman explaining the quality of the DVD's video and audio counterparts, in detail.

Lady Gaga Presents the Monster Ball Tour: At Madison Square Garden was released on DVD and Blu-ray on November 21, 2011, and was also released as a digital download to iTunes Store. In addition to the content of the original HBO broadcast, it includes new, previously unseen footage. The video is also a part of a bundled package—along with the 17-track special edition of Born This Way and a remix album, Born This Way: The Remix—titled Born This Way, The Collection, which was released the same day. Lady Gaga Presents the Monster Ball Tour: At Madison Square Garden was captured with a 14-camera High Definition shoot. The Blu-ray edition of the video album is presented in an aspect ratio of 1.78:1, encoded with MPEG-4 AVC and grants a 1080i transfer. It contains two audio tracks DTS-HD Master Audio 5.1 and LPCM 2.0. According to Jim Belcher, Vice President for Advanced Technology and Production of Universal Music Group, the advanced technologies associated with Dolby DTS-HD would allow the audience the best experience while viewing the DVD.

Brian Riordan, one of the engineers who worked on mastering the audio for the DVD described in a video interview with Rolling Stone how the mix was achieved. He recalled getting a call from one of the show's producers who were looking for specialized sound arrangements to acquire an authentic live concert feeling for the release. Riordan remembered that the main difficulty was trying to preserve the "craziness" of the audience and Gaga's fans, and their screaming during the concert, nevertheless make the music of the show primary. His team used Lossy which did not use compression, instead one-to-one audio mixing giving the whole sound system "much more of an impactful experience". Riordan decided to engineer the concert sound as "center-channeled" since Gaga did not use backing audio, resulting in the listener getting the whole impact of her vocals, when listened with a headphone. Other difficulty faced by team included converting the heavy production of Gaga's songs to a live format and utilizing the singer's bands. "You also have the crowd, the house going nuts and all the reverberations at Madison Square Garden, so it was really difficult for me to figure out globally how real, how dry, how punchy can we get this thing to sound", he added. Initially Riordan had featured more of the live instrumentation and mixed the songs a number of times, however felt that they needed a dry reverb hence he pondered on the mix along with co-producer coming to a consensus regarding the sound. According to Riordan, the mixing process was approved by Gaga who watched the cuts while travelling on the tour however, she did not ask Riordan to change anything, unlike previous projects the engineer had undertaken. The 5.1 mix was further orchestrated by using the sound recordings from the microphones placed around the audience members in Madison Square Garden, giving a new dimension to the surround sound in the Blu-ray.

It has a length of over 114 minutes and contains five subtitles: English, French, Spanish, Portuguese and German. Extra features added to the release included another a cappella version of "Born This Way" which was performed on stage unlike the one in the closing credits. A photo gallery was also included as well as backstage footage showing Gaga meeting with actress Liza Minnelli. According to Jeffrey Kauffman of Blu-ray.com, the audio tracks were commendable for their crisp sound. He stated that "One of the best things about this concert is despite its artifice, even its artificiality, there's absolutely no question that Lady Gaga is actually singing. What a novel idea for a live concert, and one that seemed especially refreshing after having just sat through the Britney Spears Live: The Femme Fatale Tour concert Blu-ray, where Brit's live voice was all but buried in the pre-records."

=== Chart performance ===
In the United States, it entered Billboard's Top Music Video chart at the top, selling 26,000 copies of the DVD—the greatest total for a music video since Beyoncé' I Am... World Tour live CD/DVD sold 37,000 and 31,000 copies in its first two weeks in November and December 2010, and held this title until the release of Adele's Live at the Royal Albert Hall. Its final appearance on the chart was for the issue dated November 30, 2013, whereupon it tallied a total of 64 weeks inside the chart. Lady Gaga Presents the Monster Ball Tour: At Madison Square Garden became the fourth best-selling music video of 2011 in the United States.

In Australia, the DVD debuted at number two on the ARIA DVD Chart. The next week, it remained in the same position, while being certified platinum by the Australian Recording Industry Association (ARIA) for shipment of 15,000 copies of the DVD. Lady Gaga Presents the Monster Ball Tour: At Madison Square Garden was certified double platinum in January 2012, denoting shipments of 30,000 copies. It was the fifth and eleventh best selling DVD of 2011 and 2012 in Australia, respectively. The DVD charted on the UK Music Video chart at number four, for the issue dated December 3, 2011. It was certified gold by the British Phonographic Industry (BPI) for selling more than 25,000 copies. Across Europe, the DVD reached the top of the charts in France and Italy, the former region it was also certified double platinum by the Syndicat National de l'Édition Phonographique (SNEP) for shipment of 30,000 copies of the release. It reached the top-ten of the charts in other nations.

=== Track listing ===
No.	Title	Writer(s)	Length
1.	"Intro"		4:29
2.	"Dance in the Dark"	Lady Gaga; Fernando Garibay	2:33
3.	"Glitter and Grease"	Gaga; Rob Fusari	2:37
4.	"Just Dance"	Gaga; RedOne; Aliaune Thiam	4:22
5.	"Beautiful, Dirty, Rich"	Gaga; Fusari	4:21
6.	"The Fame"	Gaga; Martin Kierszenbaum	4:15
7.	"LoveGame"	Gaga; RedOne	10:41
8.	"Boys Boys Boys"	Gaga; RedOne	3:18
9.	"Money Honey"	Gaga; RedOne; Bilal Hajji	3:16
10.	"Telephone"	Gaga; Rodney Jerkins; LaShawn Daniels; Lazonate Franklin; Beyoncé	6:34
11.	"Speechless"	Gaga	6:16
12.	"You and I"	Gaga	9:24
13.	"So Happy I Could Die"	Gaga; RedOne; Space Cowboy	4:44
14.	"Monster"	RedOne; Gaga; Space Cowboy	6:37
15.	"Teeth"	Gaga; Taja Riley	9:42
16.	"Alejandro"	RedOne; Gaga	5:25
17.	"Poker Face"	Gaga; RedOne	3:56
18.	"Paparazzi"	Gaga; Fusari	6:31
19.	"Bad Romance"	RedOne; Gaga	6:22
20.	"Born This Way"	Gaga; Jeppe Laursen; Paul Blair aka DJ White Shadow	9:00

Bonus content

- "Born This Way" (a cappella) – 3:16
- "Backstage at the Monster Ball" – 12:50
- Photo gallery
- Track listing adapted from Amazon.com.

=== Weekly charts ===
Chart (2011)	Peak position
Argentinian Video Chart	2
Australian Music DVD Chart	2
Austrian Music DVD Top 10	5
Belgian Music DVD Chart (Flanders)	3
Belgian Music DVD Chart (Wallonia)	2
Czech Music DVD Chart	9
Danish Music DVD Top 10	7
Dutch Music DVD Top 10	3
French Music DVD Chart	1
Finnish Music DVD Chart	4
German Music DVD Chart	6
Hungarian Music DVD Chart	3
Irish Music DVD Chart	6
Italian Music DVD Chart	1
Japanese Oricon DVD Chart	3
Spanish DVD Chart	6
Swedish Music Video Chart	5
Swiss Music Video Chart	2
UK Music Video Chart	4
US Billboard Top Music Videos	1

=== Year-end charts ===
Chart (2011)	Position
Argentinian Music DVD Chart	6
Australian Music DVD Chart	5
Belgian Music DVD Chart (Flanders)	28
Belgian Music DVD Chart (Wallonia)	42
Dutch Music DVD Chart	40
French Music DVD Chart	11
Swedish Music DVD Chart	25
US Billboard Top Music Videos	4

Chart (2012)	Position
Australian Music DVD Chart	11
Belgian Music DVD Chart (Flanders)	10
Belgian Music DVD Chart (Wallonia)	14
Dutch Music DVD Chart	20
French Music DVD Chart	26
Swedish Music DVD Chart	20
US Billboard Top Music Videos	10

=== Certifications ===
Region	Certification	Certified units/sales
Australia (ARIA)	2× Platinum	30,000^{^}
Brazil (Pro-Música Brasil)	Platinum	30,000^{*}
France (SNEP)	2× Platinum	30,000^{*}
United Kingdom (BPI)	Gold	25,000^{*}
^{*} Sales figures based on certification alone.^{^} Shipments figures based on certification alone.

== Credits and personnel ==
Credits adapted from Lady Gaga Presents the Monster Ball Tour: At Madison Square Garden DVD booklet.

Main personnel

- Laurieann Gibson – director
- Troy Carter – executive producer
- Nicole Ehrlich – creative producer
- Lady Gaga – executive producer
- Vincent Herbert – executive producer
- Jimmy Iovine – executive producer
- Steven Johnson – co-producer
- Mark Leed – associate producer
- Mo Morrison – executive producer

Production crew

- Bill DeRonde – film editing
- Michael Polito – film editing
- Leroy Bennett – production design
- Peter Aquinde – art direction
- Production Management Jason Danter – production manager
- Clarence Fuller – production manager
- Susan Kopensky – production supervisor
- Jennifer Krobot – assistant production manager
- Mo Morrison – production executive
- Dave Oberg – post-production supervisor
- Rob Paine – executive in charge of production
- Karen Scarminach – production manager
- Michael Polito – associate director
- Sandra Restrepo – associate director (as Sandra Restrepo Considine)
- Art Department Lonnie Adams – carpenter
- Dave Cockrell – carpenter
- Kia Crawford – props
- Dan Gurchik – carpenter
- Bob Hood – carpenter
- Brandon Kennedy – props
- Chris Organ – carpenter
- Wayne Pina – carpenter
- Bobby Reid – carpenter
- Eddie Rodriguez – carpenter
- Norm Sigal – carpenter
- Kenneth Walter – head carpenter (as Kenneth 'Scotty' Walter)

Costumes and makeup

- Rachel Barret – costume designer
- Alun Davies – costume designer
- Keko Hainswheeler – costume designer
- Charlie Le Mindu – costume designer
- Armani Prive – costume designer
- Philip Treacy – costume designer
- Zaldy – costume designer
- Frederic Aspiras – hair stylist (as Frederic Aspiras)
- Deborah Lippman – manicurist
- Brandon Maxwell – stylist
- Tara Savelo – makeup
- Sarah Tanno – makeup artist
- Marissa Willinsky – makeup artist

Sound Department

- James Allen – sound technician: pa
- Wayne Bacon – sound technician: pa
- Charlie Campbell – audio assistant
- Timothy Cleary – sound recordist (as Tim Cleary)
- Phil DeTolve – post audio assist
- Bill Flugan – rf/pl technician
- Michael A. Fortunato – audio assistant
- Jim Goldsmith – audio assistant (as Jimmy Goldsmith)
- Gabriel Heredia – sound designer
- Skip Kent – audio assistant
- Brian Kingman – audio assistant
- Don Klocker – sound crew chief
- James LaMarca – sound technician: pa
- Adrian Martinez – boom operator
- Ramon Morales – monitor engineer
- Brian Riordan – sound re-recording mixer
- Pete Smalls – sound designer
- Kevin Szafraniec – sound technician: pa
- Horace Ward – f.o.h. engineer
- Barry S. Weir Jr. – mix assist / post audio assist

Special Effects

- Rob Liscio – pyro technician (as Robert Liscio)
- Raymond Seymour – pyro technician (as Ray Seymour)
- Boyd Stepan – special effects
- Visual Effects by George Loucas – visual effects supervisor: Baked FX
- Pierce Various – digital imaging technician
- Camera and Electrical Department Lauren Ackert – electrician (as Laura Ackert)
- Jeff Adkisson – rigger
- Stuart Allen – supertechnocrane technician (as Stewart Allen)
- Lenyn Barahona – head rigger
- Matt Bass – second unit director of photography

Lighting crew

- Tom Beck – lighting director
- Leroy Bennett – lighting designer (as Le Roy Bennett)
- Larry Blanchette – best boy grip
- Marina Blanchette – grip
- Matt Boles – gaffer
- Matt Bright – lighting technician
- Billy Broker – supertechnocrane technician
- Kevin Chung – camera operator
- Bob DelRusso – camera operator (as Robert Del Russo)
- Dan Denitto – techno jib tech
- Ian Dobson – chief lighting technician
- Adam Dragosin – video crew chief
- Suzanne Ebner – camera operator
- Douglas Eder – lighting technician
- Dave Evans – lighting technician
- Steve Fatone – video director: screens
- George Feldbauer – grip
- Cory FitzGerald – lighting board operator (as Corey Fitzgerald)
- Meg Flanagan – lighting technician

Principal photography

- Freddy Frederick – camera operator
- Rob Gardner – lighting crew chief
- Matt Geneczko – lighting technician
- Pat Gleason – camera operator
- Scott Grund – camera operator
- Stephen Halouvas – lighting technician
- Jason Harvey – video engineer
- Helene Haviland – camera operator
- Lowell Hawley – lighting technician
- Greg Hoffman – key grip
- Alvah Holmes – assistant camera
- Carl Horahan – lighting technician
- David Hunkins – gaffer (as Dave Hunkins)
