= Marry the Night =

2011 single by Lady Gaga

Single by Lady Gaga

from the album Born This Way
- A-side: "The Weeknd & Illangelo Remix"
- B-side: "Totally Enormous Extinct Dinosaurs 'Marry Me' Remix"
- Published: May 17, 2011
- Released: November 11, 2011
- Recorded: 2010
- Studio: Studio Bus
- Genre: Dance-pop; synth-pop
- Length: 4:24
- Label: Streamline; KonLive; Interscope
- Songwriters: Lady Gaga; Fernando Garibay
- Producers: Lady Gaga; Fernando Garibay

Lady Gaga singles chronology
"The Lady Is a Tramp" (2011)	"Marry the Night" (2011)	"Applause" (2013)

Music video
- "Marry The Night" on YouTube

"Marry the Night" is a song recorded by American singer and songwriter Lady Gaga for her second studio album, Born This Way (2011). The track was initially released for promotion on FarmVille, six days before the release of Born This Way. It was released as the fifth and initially final single from the album (until the much later release of "Bloody Mary" in 2022) on November 11, 2011, by Interscope Records. The song was written and produced by Gaga and Fernando Garibay, and was recorded on the tour bus during The Monster Ball Tour. Revealed in February 2011, "Marry the Night" was inspired by the energy of Gaga's previous songs like "Dance in the Dark" and her love for her hometown, New York City.

"Marry the Night" is a dance-pop and synth-pop song influenced by electro rock and house music. The track features electronic church bells, a driving electro organ sound, techno beats and a funk rock influenced breakdown. The lyrics are a tribute to Gaga's love of the nightlife and partying, while serving as a homage to her hometown. "Marry the Night" received mostly positive reviews from critics, who praised its grand and euphoric dance nature. They furthermore found influences of Italian disco music producer Giorgio Moroder and American rock musician Bruce Springsteen in the song. After the release of Born This Way, "Marry the Night" charted in some nations due to digital sales from the parent album.

Gaga directed the music video, which was filmed in New York City. It tells the story of when she was signed by her label Interscope Records after being dropped from her former record label, Def Jam Recordings, with scenes in a clinic, a dance studio, her own New York apartment and on a car's rooftop at a parking lot. She sports outfits by Calvin Klein Collection, Yves Saint Laurent and Stéphane Rolland. Prior to its release, the music video was teased with video stills and previews. Critics wrote positively on the clip, deeming it creative and ambitious, while lauding its narrative theme. Gaga has performed the song at the 2011 MTV Europe Music Awards, The X Factor, and as the final song of her Born This Way Ball tour (2012–2013). She also recorded an acoustic version for her Thanksgiving Day special, A Very Gaga Thanksgiving.

== Writing and recording ==
"Marry the Night" was written by Lady Gaga and Fernando Garibay while on the road for The Monster Ball Tour, and was produced by both. It was first mentioned by Gaga as a track from her album, Born This Way on Ryan Seacrest's radio show, where she described it as one of her favorite songs from the album. Gaga and Garibay had worked previously on the song "Dance in the Dark" (2009), from Gaga's previous release, The Fame Monster. Before starting work on "Marry the Night", Gaga listened to "Dance in the Dark" and decided she wanted to top that song's energy with her new collaboration with Garibay. "I remember being backstage and hearing the concert start, so I go out there and hear 'Dance in the Dark' open up the whole concert, and I wanted to outdo that feeling. I wanted to outdo that moment that opens up the show. I'm just that way."

"It's like Whitney, but imagine if Bruce Springsteen had a baby with Whitney Houston — that's what it is. And that was it! We made a baby. Finally. After all that fornication, miserably long and tedious, Fernando [Garibay] and I finally conceived."

— Lady Gaga talking about "Marry the Night" to MTV News

Wanting to have a new style of music, Gaga made it clear she did not want her fans to like the song. She wanted to write a song that could define where she was with Born This Way and her life. In an interview with NME, Gaga explained that the main inspiration behind the song was singer Whitney Houston and also added: "This song is about me going back to New York. I wrote this about the courage it took for me to say 'I hate Hollywood, I just wanna live in Brooklyn and make music'".

As Gaga performed on The Monster Ball Tour, Garibay started working on the music of the song. After the show was over, Gaga came back to her studio bus and asked him about the progress. Garibay then explained that he had concocted a different kind of music for the song, and played the church-bell inspired music to Gaga. After first hearing it, the singer said that she started to cry, noticing the vastness of the music, and she started writing the lyrics for "Marry the Night". "Marry the Night" was originally recorded on the Bus Studio in 2010, but was later mixed at The Mix Room in Burbank, California by Dave Russell, assisted by Paul Pavao. Gaga described the song as a "massive, gas-station, disco record", and she recorded it immediately after completing the lyrics. According to Garibay, Gaga meditated for a few minutes and then asked him to hand over a recording microphone to her, completing the process within an hour.

== Composition ==
"Marry the Night"
A 30 second sample of the song, where Gaga sings the opening lines backed by the electronic church bell sounds. The song changes into the chorus, with dance beats accompanying it.

"Marry the Night" is a dance-pop and synthpop song with electro rock and house influences. The song starts out with electronic church bells and Gaga softly singing "I'm gonna marry the night/I won't give up on my life/I'm a warrior queen/Live passionately tonight." Soon the beat changes into a dance one, accompanied with techno beats, handclaps and funk music, and moves to the chorus, where Gaga stutters the line "Ma-ma-ma-marry/Ma-ma-ma-marry/Ma-ma-ma-marry the night". It was compared by Tim Jonze from The Guardian to the Eurodance song, "It's My Life" by Dr Alban, while Nicola James from MTV compared the chorus with Jennifer Lopez's 1999 single "Waiting for Tonight". In a pre-release review of certain album tracks, Peter Robinson from the NME blog wrote that Gaga channels "Whitney Houston-esque pop euphoria" into the song, notably that from the singer's musical peak.

The chorus is followed by a funk-rock influenced breakdown, where Gaga sings the line: "Nothing's too cool/To take me from you/New York is not just a tan that you'll never lose." According to the sheet music published at Musicnotes.com by Sony/ATV Music Publishing, "Marry the Night" was written in the time signature of common time, with a slow tempo of 64 beats per minute for the intro, followed by a driving pop beat of 132 beats per minute. It is composed in the key of A minor with Gaga's vocal range spanning from G_{3} to E_{5}. It follows a basic sequence of Am–Dm/A–F/A–G as its chord progression. The church bells in the song were meant to draw parallels between Gaga's fans and members of a religion or a cult. The lyrics are about partying and wreaking havoc during the night, and serves as a homage to the New York City downtown music scene. Evan Sawdey from PopMatters described the lyrics as a "'let's take the night' rallying cry."

== Release ==
"Marry the Night" was planned to be the lead single from Born This Way, but was cancelled in favor of the title track. "Marry the Night" was then supposed to be the third single, but was cancelled yet again, this time in favor of "The Edge of Glory". Gaga first premiered "Marry the Night" on the HBO Monster Ball Special, which aired on May 7, 2011. While backstage, she sang a cappella: "I'm gonna marry the night/ I won't give up on my life/ I'm a warrior queen/ Live passionately tonight." During the promotional appearances for Born This Way, Gaga released "Marry the Night" to the online game FarmVille on May 17, 2011. The song was released on Gagaville, a subdivision of Farmville that Gaga helped design with game promotion company Zynga. Four months since the release of Born This Way, "Marry the Night" was confirmed as the fifth single from the album by Gaga herself. In September 2011, Interscope Records, Gaga's label, stated that while "Marry the Night" is sure to be released as the fifth single internationally, they were undecided which song would serve in its place in the US. Gaga confirmed the single's UK release for November 21, 2011, which included remixes. The date was pushed back to December 11, 2011, however. Gaga's label later decided to release "Marry the Night" in the United States as well; it was added to the playlists of rhythmic and mainstream music radio on November 15, 2011.

On October 17, 2011, Gaga revealed the official artwork for "Marry the Night" via TwitPic, citing the lyrics from the bridge of the song, "New York Is Not Just A Tan That You'll Never Lose". The artwork shows her sitting atop a rain-soaked car while another vehicle burns in the background. She is wearing a pair of over-the-knee leather boots, a sculpted top and shorts while shaking her blond hair. AOL's Contessa Gayles described the artwork as a "mysterious night-crawler."

== Critical reception ==
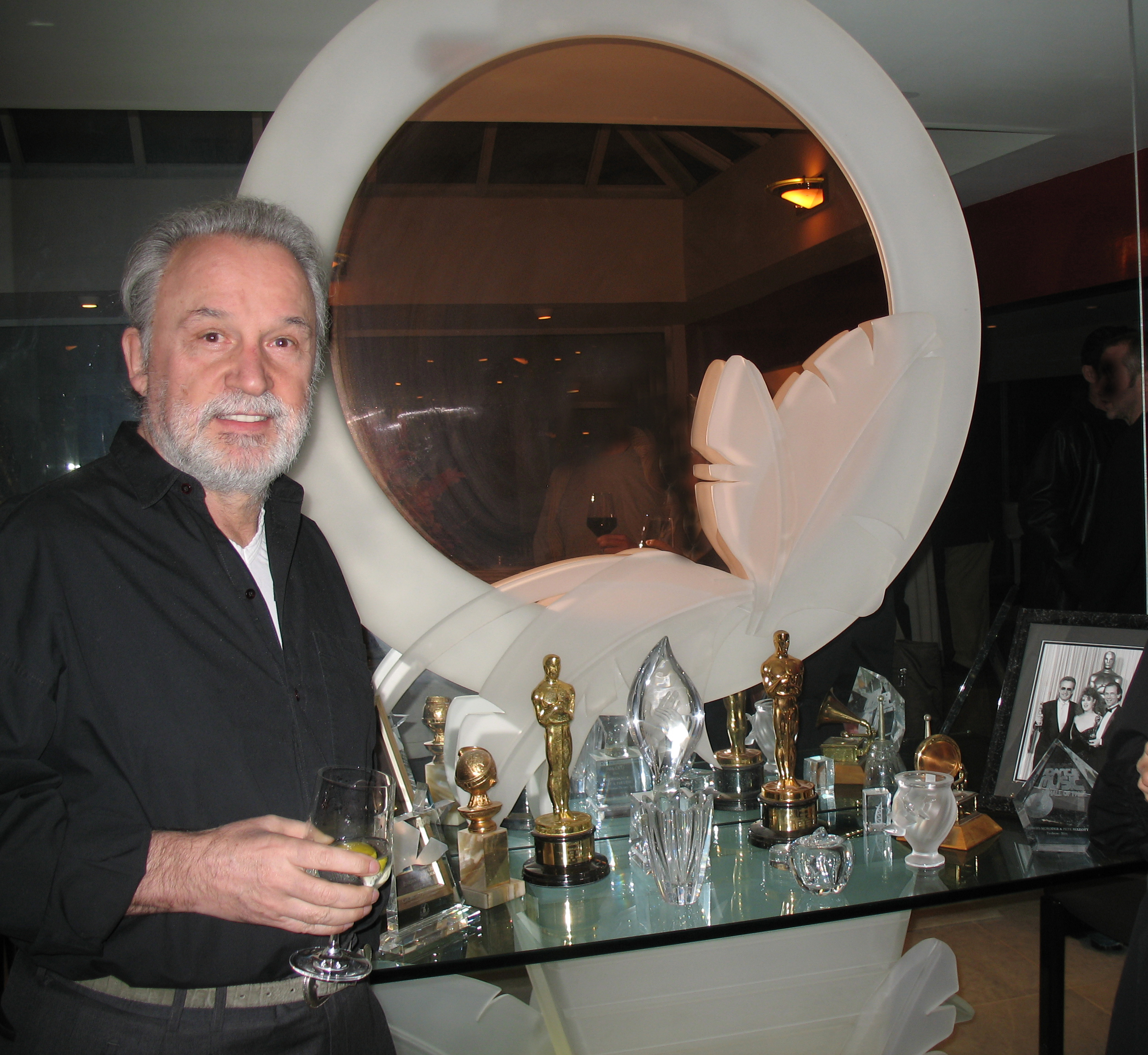
"Marry the Night" was compared to the work of Giorgio Moroder by some critics.

Since its release, "Marry the Night" has garnered generally positive reviews; Stephen Thomas Erlewine of AllMusic gave the song a positive review, saying it "glistens with a neon pulse". Sal Cinquemani of Slant Magazine named "Marry the Night" a stand-out track on the album and called it "a worthy successor to 'Dance in the Dark'". BBC Music's Mark Savage called "Marry the Night" as perfect as "a straightforward fist-pumping entry into a colossus can be." Christian Blauvelt of Entertainment Weekly compared the song with the work of Italian record producer Giorgio Moroder. Caryn Ganz of Spin was impressed with the track, calling it a "four-on-the-floor banger." Tim Jonze of The Guardian compared the chorus of the song "It's My Life" by Dr Alban and felt that it was easily forgotten compared to some of the bigger dance songs on the album. Rolling Stone's was impressed with the fact that "Marry the Night" just seemed to get "bigger, and bigger" to her, while listing pop and glam metal and artists like Pat Benatar, Bonnie Tyler and Bon Jovi as its influences. According to Kitty Empire of The Observer, "'Marry the Night', is a blowsy carpe [noctem] affair which draws on hi-NRG club-pop for its modus operandi."

Evan Sawdey from PopMatters gave the song a negative review, saying "'Marry the Night' very much wants to be top-notch Justice knockoff, but by adding a bridge of upbeat platitudes and an utterly pointless instrumental section after the 3:30 mark, she ultimately winds up weakening the power of her 'let's take the night' rallying cry". Kerri Mason from Billboard found influences of gothic rock in it, but went on to call it an "unapologetic disco-powered pop" that could have been a production number on Gaga's debut album, The Fame (2008). Neil McCormick from The Daily Telegraph gave an analogy with rock musician "Meat Loaf going to the disco", while describing the song. NME's Dan Martin felt that the song, although impressive, was conservative as the opening song of Born This Way. He further found similarities to the work of Moroder and influences of Bruce Springsteen's 1975 single, "Born to Run".

Robert Copsey of the website Digital Spy called the song an "electro-thumping number with euphoric synths and uplifting melody" which according to him further drew comparison to Gaga's own song "Born This Way". Copsey further stated that "This is no bad thing, as it's less in-yer-face, and it's 'M-m-m-marry the night' hook is equally as catchy." Awarding the song with four out of five stars Lewis Corner of the same website wrote: "'I'm gonna marry the night/ I won't give up on my life/ I'm a warrior queen, live passionately, tonight,' GaGa calls out over a suitably grand introduction of deistic bells and rumbling techno synths – the result not to dissimilar, we imagine, to Paul Van Dyk playing an organ at a wedding ceremony. Defiant and epic, the track feeds into Stef's cult-focused fan base like a prophet calling upon their disciples – and given it's the single they've been waiting for, we have no doubt they'll come in their droves."

In 2019, Billboard ranked the song number four on their list of the 15 greatest Lady Gaga songs, and in 2020, The Guardian ranked the song number 11 on their list of the 30 greatest Lady Gaga songs. In 2021, an article from Billboard regarding the 100 best musical bridges of the 21st century featured "Marry the Night" at number 50, saying "the Born This Way leadoff is one of Gaga's most barnstorming singles, less of an album opener than a theatrical curtain-raiser, and the bridge makes sure that it doesn't spend so much time on the dancefloor it forgets its streetwise roots, giving it a little Bon Jovi muscle to match its Donna Summer sheen."

== Chart performance ==
Following the release of Born This Way on May 23, 2011, "Marry the Night" debuted at number 57 on the United States Billboard Hot Digital Songs Chart with sales of 35,000 digital downloads, allowing it to enter the Billboard Hot 100 at number 79. Following its release in November as the fifth radio-promoted single from the album, the song re-entered the chart at number 97 on the issue dated December 3, 2011. In its fourth week on the chart, the track moved to number 32, selling 20,000 digital downloads (up by 163% that week) and garnering 23 million audience impressions as per Nielsen Broadcast Data Systems. The song later peaked at number 29 on the chart, becoming Gaga's first radio-promoted single not to reach the top ten and ending her streak of eleven consecutive top ten hits.

"Marry the Night" debuted at number 24 on the Pop Songs, which is the third-highest debut on that chart in 2011, following Gaga's "Born This Way" (number 14) and Britney Spears' "Hold It Against Me" (number 16). The following week it jumped to number 18 before peaking at 14, becoming Gaga's twelfth consecutive top 20 on the US pop chart. "Marry the Night" debuted at number 37 on the Adult Pop Songs chart before later peaking at 27. On the Hot Dance Club Songs chart, the song debuted at number 33 before climbing to the summit in its fifth week, becoming her twelfth chart-topper and tying "Telephone" as Gaga's second-fastest ascent to number one on that chart. In October 2017, the song was certified Platinum by the Recording Industry Association of America (RIAA), and has sold 713,000 pure copies in the United States as of April 2015.

In Canada, "Marry the Night" entered the Canadian Hot 100 at number 91 before peaking at 11, while debuting on the Canadian Digital Songs chart at number 50 before peaking at 16. In Australia, the song debuted at number 88 on the ARIA Singles Chart and peaked at number 80. The song reached a peak of number 11 on South Korea's Gaon International Singles Chart. In the United Kingdom, "Marry the Night" initially entered the UK Singles Chart for one week following the release of Born This Way, but later peaked at number 16 after its release as a single. Elsewhere in Europe, the song was moderately successful, peaking at number 38 on Belgium's Walloon Ultratop 50 singles chart, number 24 on the Irish Singles Chart, number 17 on the German Singles Chart and top 50 in French Singles Chart.

== Music video ==
=== Background and development ===
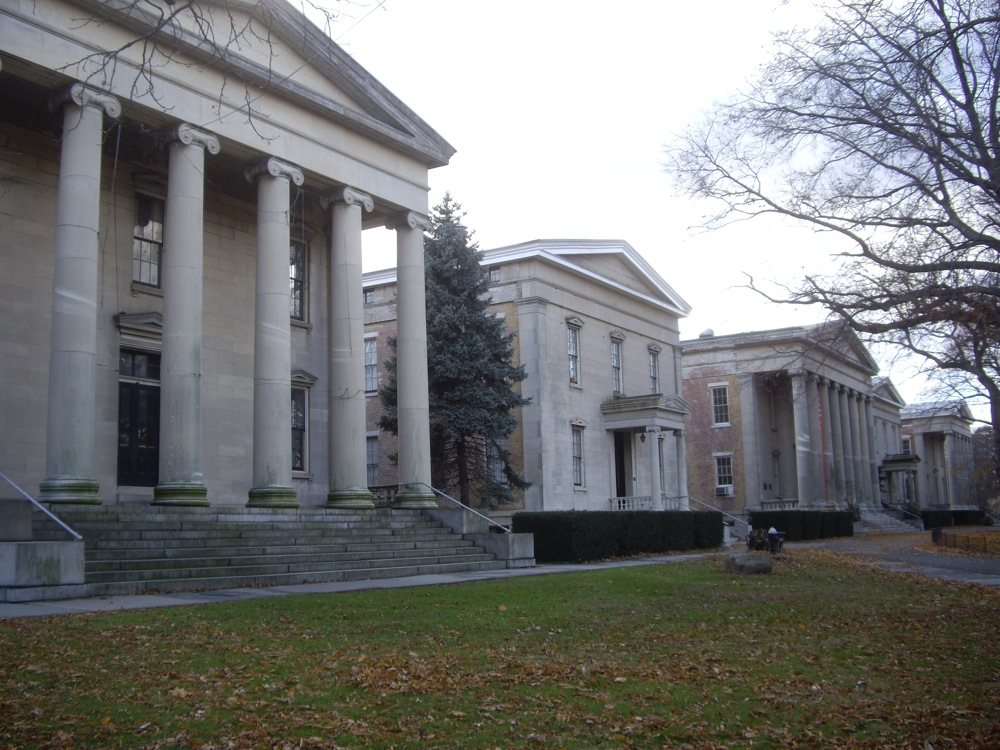
A portion of the video was shot at the Snug Harbor Cultural Center.

Gaga filmed parts of the music video for "Marry the Night" in Staten Island and Harlem, New York, from October 10 to 13, 2011. On October 17, Gaga posted on her Twitter account that she had finished filming and could not "wait to unfold all its secrets and share with you moments from my past I have yet to reveal". Talking about the filming of the video, Lynn Kelly, a CEO of the Snug Harbor Cultural Center, where the video was shot said,

We found both her and her crew to be easy to work with and low-key. I think we would have expected a lot of drama, and the truth is, she is probably the most down-to-earth person. It was endearing. She was friendly and kind. ... I think, for us, we're so excited to have someone of her talent, and to have somebody like that shoot here is a sheer honor. What her music does for music is so much more than entertainment. It's connecting to the arts on a much deeper level, and that's what I hope we can do here."

On October 11, 2011, several publications announced that Gaga was seen during the filming of the video in Snug Harbor Cultural Center. She was wearing a custom-made double zip lambskin jumpsuit by New York City designer, Asher Levine which was said to go along with the video's "grungy" and "bloody" theme and with the "nod to New York downtown refinement." Dancers and extras were spotted dressed in multiple looks: some as ballerinas and others in leopard print while Gaga's mother was also seen on stage. Later, other photos of the filming were published on several websites and they showed Gaga with blue lipstick and a leather romper with several male dancers, in a long-sleeve red dress with padded shoulders, a satellite dish and a big black hat. Footage of the video was posted online on October 14, 2011. Gaga is seen dancing on the roof of a car as she sings the bridge from the song. She then slides down the car and begins running around the hood as the chorus starts. She's dressed in black, with a blond bob wig and black heels while rain is visible in the background, but she appears unfazed by the weather. During an interview with NDTV on October 31, Gaga revealed that she directed the video. She also worked with the director of photography Darius Khondji and art director Gideon Ponte.

=== Release ===
Gaga teased on Twitter that the video would be her longest and "the beginning of the story I never told you." On November 11, 2011, she posted a still from the video on Twitter that shows her as she is sent down a hallway on a stretcher by two nurses. The post was accompanied by the message "It's not that I've been dishonest, it's just that I loathe reality." James Montgomery of MTV News compared the scene—known as "The Prelude Pathétique"—to the 1975 drama film One Flew Over the Cuckoo's Nest and the 1980 horror film The Shining. Gaga teased a two-minute opening sequence of the music video on November 17, 2011, after her performance at Children In Need Rocks Manchester.

On November 20, Gaga went on Alan Carr: Chatty Man and explained the meaning behind the "Marry the Night" music video. "I know how rejection feels in the business. I got signed, I got dropped, I got signed again. That's actually what the 'Marry the Night' video is about. It's about one of the most horrible days of my life when I got dropped from my first record label and it's the story of what happened that day." A second preview of the music video, shot in a dance studio, premiered on November 25, 2011. Gaga told Vanity Fair magazine that the video is "autobiographical" and illustrates "the worst day of my life." The entire video premiered on December 1, 2011 on E! Online at 8.00 pm EST. However, the video appeared online several hours before its official release. Gaga took to her Twitter to express dissatisfaction with the leak of the video, saying that it was "like an old tampon." The video for the song is 13 minutes long.

=== Synopsis ===
Scene from the "Marry the Night" music video, which some critics felt Gaga resembled Madonna in the 1985 film, Desperately Seeking Susan.

The autobiographical story begins as a brunette Gaga is taken through a clinic on a stretcher, while an inner monologue about her past memories is heard. The nurses wear Calvin Klein Collection uniforms and Giuseppe Zanotti shoes. A nurse awakens Gaga and checks her heart rate and blood pressure. The nurse then tells Gaga how beautiful she is and how she looked just like her mother when she delivered the former. Gaga then claims that her mother was a saint, before taking a cigarette out of her bag. The nurse, startled by this, quickly then takes the cigarette out of her mouth and puts it on a table. Gaga cries and tells the nurse that she will become a star. She asks the nurse to play music and the camera zooms out to show viewers several female patients treated and wandering off. A new scene shows Gaga practicing ballet dancing to piano music, and a following one shows her taken back from the hospital to her New York apartment by her best friend Bo. Ludwig van Beethoven's "Piano Sonata No. 8" plays. Gaga is undressed from an outfit designed by Stéphane Rolland and taken to bed, but is interrupted by a phone call that notifies her of being dropped from her record label. Frustrated, she makes a mess in her apartment, pours breakfast cereal on herself, and jumps in the bath with her heels on. The piano music ends and Gaga is seen bleaching her hair, bathing in a tub, and humming "Marry the Night". The monologue continues as Gaga says, "But I still had my bedazzler and I had a lot of patches, shiny ones from M&J Trimmings, so I wreaked havoc on some old denim. And I did what any girl would do—I did it all over again." According to Jocelyn Vena of MTV News, Gaga resembles pop artist Madonna in the film Desperately Seeking Susan. Gaga's dancers look down at her from a mezzanine as the clock chimes.

The video later shifts to a night scene on a building rooftop, where half of Gaga's body is inside a Pontiac Firebird, while her legs protrude from the window and onto the roof of the car. She has blonde hair and wears a black plastic leather outfit. She gets her full body into the car, kissing a "Marry the Night" tape and inserting it into the audio player. The song begins playing as Gaga smokes on the driver's seat. As the chorus begins, vehicles in the background explode aflame and Gaga exits the car and dances. In a new dance studio setting as the second verse begins, Gaga enters with her dancers, and warms up to do an intricate choreography during the chorus with her team. During the bridge, she and her dance team take a break and warm up to perform another choreography. The rooftop car parking scene and a bath scene intersperse. Gaga and her dancers repeat the choreography during the final chorus, as one dancer falls and is helped up by Gaga. During the breakdown, Gaga and her team dance on a street while interspersing scenes show her causing chaos, including falling down the stairs, attempting to get into a car with a ridiculously oversized hat and pouring water over herself with a marble plant pot in the bath. She enters a car and reveals "Interscope Records; Hollywood, CA; 4 p.m." written on her palm. The last scene shows Gaga in couture and surrounded by flames. The video ends with Gaga suddenly vanishing.

=== Reception and analysis ===
"It's a succinct summary of Gaga's aesthetic, but the video itself is a sprawling epic, with the song preceded by several minutes of cheeky, artsy psycho-drama set in a mental health clinic. There's ballet, nudity, fashion from the future, French dialogue, cars on fire, a little bit of weeping, and lots and lots of dancing. Even compared to other Gaga video epics, this one seems particularly crazy and ambitious."

— Rolling Stone's Matthew Perpetua talking about the video for "Marry the Night".

Jason Lipshutz of Billboard commented that the video "features the pop star at her most gloriously provocative, with extended dance sequences, explosions, nudity, and a violent attack on a box of Honey Nut Cheerios." Gin Sepre of E! Online compared the video with the book Girl, Interrupted noting that "with equal parts autobiography and pure spectacle, it truly has something for everyone." Sepre also praised the fact that the video is "certainly not hurting for a lack of creativity" with the scenes being shown in a "slightly more straightforward, [and] less metaphorical way". Jocelyn Vena from MTV opined that "with references to everything from Fame and Black Swan to The Bell Jar, the video is a sweeping look into Gaga's psyche. Entertainment Weekly's Tanner Stransky described the video as "quite the trip to Total Crazyville, population: 1, Lady Gaga... Leave it to Lady Gaga to unspool a mini-movie video that’s half the length of a sitcom episode." Gilly Ferguson of Daily Mirror noted that the video "still has the shock factor – she's naked for starters." Sarah Anne Hughes of The Washington Post commented that the video "is slightly NSFW because of one word and some censored skin." Oscar Moralde of Slant Magazine wrote that the video, "is one of her biggest epics not merely by length (a weighty 14 minutes), but by the breadth of its modes of expression."

Michael Cragg of The Guardian gave a positive review for the video and wrote: "Superstars are at their best when they're simultaneously aware and unaware of their own ridiculousness and that's what Marry the Night delivers for Lady Gaga." Daily News' Kathryn Kattalia compared Gaga with Madonna in several scenes in the video. Kattalia further praised the dancing during the video, describing it as "her best". However, she criticized the scenes of nudity noting: "The rest of the video is pretty tame by Gaga standards." Spin's Marc Hogan wrote that "it's hard to tell where Gaga is winking at us and where she's simply fallen into a foxhole of unrestrained ego." Camille Mann of CBS News described the video as an "avant-garde short film" and noted that Gaga was "pushing [her] boundaries." Leah Collins of Dose compared Gaga's outfits with Christian Louboutin's designs. She further compared the set in the video to the cover artwork of Born This Way and called it a "very fashionable recreation of Girl, Interrupted." A writer of CNN commented, "Lady Gaga is known for creating evocative mini-movies to provide the visuals for her singles, and 'Marry the Night' is no different." Describing the video as "rough" and "enigmatic", Liz Raftery of People further commented that it "will certainly leave fans talking, if not scratching their heads." An editor of ABC News praised Gaga's "interesting perspective in the video." NME's Priya Elan wrote that Gaga sounds like "a lobotomized Carrie Bradshaw" during the introduction. He also commented, "It's definitely an improvement on 'Judas', but could it maybe have been snipped a bit to make it shorter?"

== Live performances ==
On October 31, 2011, Gaga performed a Bollywood version of "Marry the Night" in India during a Formula One after party in Greater Noida. Before the performance, she announced "I feel like I've waited a long time to come here. And I feel very grateful. ... For the first time ever, I'm going to sing 'Marry the Night'." She sat on the piano and played a slow version of the song, accompanied by a sitar. At the 2011 MTV Europe Music Awards, Gaga gave her first televised performance of "Marry the Night" dressed as a satellite landing on the Moon. Wearing a red bikini, and a large red disc around her, Gaga was perched atop a semi-circular replica of the Moon which was covered in silver chains. Flames erupted around the stage as Gaga revealed another circular disc covering her face. She sang the song from that vantage point and near the end of the performance, removed the metal disc and performed a choreographed dance routine with her back-up dancers. She also performed the song at the 2011 Bambi Awards in Wiesbaden, Germany, on November 10. The stage included a vintage convertible with a keyboard built into the side of the door and Gaga also won an award later that night at the gala.

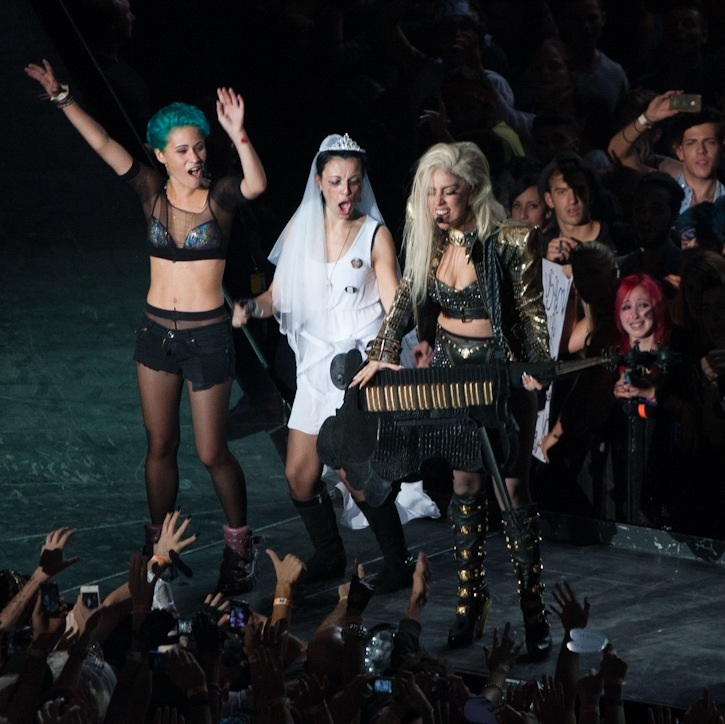
Gaga performing "Marry the Night" during the Born This Way Ball. For this performance she would usually invite members of the audience to dance with her onstage.

Gaga appeared on the eighth series of The X Factor on November 13, 2011, and performed the song. Whilst singing, she emerged from a confessional dressed as a decapitated corpse, carrying her own head. She sang most of the song before returning to the booth and re-appearing in a leotard-like outfit and performed the rest of the song and a dance routine with her dancers. At the Children in Need Rocks Manchester concert on November 17, 2011, "Marry the Night" was performed as the final song of her set list, along with "Born This Way" and "The Edge of Glory". The performance was fast-paced and included a dance routine by Gaga with her dancers, for the first time. On the British comedy talk show Alan Carr: Chatty Man, Gaga performed an acoustic rendition of "Marry the Night" on piano, wearing a large hot-pink bow and surrounded by candles.

On the ABC special, A Very Gaga Thanksgiving, the singer performed an acoustic version of "Marry the Night". Her look, consisting of a shoulder-less black dress with matching hand gloves, was compared by James Dinh of MTV News to actress Audrey Hepburn. The performance was shot on top of a balcony, with Gaga giving poses while holding the microphone. On the CBS special titled The Grammy Nominations Concert Live! – Countdown to Music's Biggest Night—where the nominations for the 54th Grammy Awards were revealed—Gaga opened the show with "Marry the Night", performing in a zombie-like costume. Todd Martens from Los Angeles Times described it as a "dance-meets-hair metal mix-up", while comparing the choreography of the dance to Michael Jackson's music video for "Thriller", and complimented Gaga's vocals. At the 2011 Jingle Ball in Los Angeles, Gaga performed the song in an imitation of the music video, by perching atop a hospital bed and singing from there. She also headlined Z100's Jingle Ball at Madison Square Garden. Her set included current hits from Born This Way and a hospital gown-clad "Marry the Night" finale that paid tribute to her music video. On December 9, 2011 she gave a ballet-themed performance of the song on The Ellen DeGeneres Show. Gaga also performed "Marry the Night" on the 2011 Music Station Super Live in Japan and she performed a medley of "Heavy Metal Lover/Marry the Night/Born This Way" on Dick Clark's New Year's Rockin' Eve with Ryan Seacrest on December 31, 2011. The song was performed as the final song of her Born This Way Ball tour (2012–2013), where she played on a keytar during the song, and usually invited audience members onstage to join her for the finale.

In 2025, Gaga performed "Marry the Night" on the piano at select dates of The Mayhem Ball tour.

== Cover versions ==
In 2013, pop singer Adam Lambert performed a cover version on Glee's fifth-season episode "A Katy or a Gaga" as his character Elliot "Starchild" Gilbert. Lambert's cover would later chart at number 39 on the US Pop Digital Songs chart.

In 2021, Australian singer Kylie Minogue covered the song for the tenth anniversary edition of Born This Way. Mike Wass of Variety described Minogue's take on the song as a "glittery, disco-tinged version". Also in 2021, American actress Camila Mendes performed the song as her role of Veronica Lodge in Riverdale's sixth-season Rivervale episode "Chapter Ninety-Eight: Mr. Cypher".

== Track listing and formats ==
Marry the Night – The Remixes

1. "Marry the Night" (Zedd Remix) – 6:14
2. "Marry the Night" (Sander van Doorn Remix) – 5:38
3. "Marry the Night" (Afrojack Remix) – 9:18
4. "Marry the Night" (John Dahlback Remix) – 5:19
5. "Marry the Night" (Sidney Samson Remix) – 4:44
6. "Marry the Night" (R3hab Remix) – 4:54
7. "Marry the Night" (Lazy Rich Remix) – 5:43
8. "Marry the Night" (Dimitri Vegas & Like Mike Remix) – 5:58
9. "Marry the Night" (Quitntino Remix) – 5:52
10. "Marry the Night" (Danny Verde Remix) – 7:45

CD single

1. "Marry the Night" (Album Version) – 4:24
2. "Marry the Night" (David Jost & Twin Radio Remix) – 3:31

UK 7" picture disc

1. "Marry the Night" (The Weeknd & Illangelo Remix) – 4:04
2. "Marry the Night" (Totally Enormous Extinct Dinosaurs 'Marry Me' Remix) – 5:49

== Personnel ==
Credits adapted from the liner notes of Born This Way.

=== Recording and management ===
- Recorded at Studio Bus in Europe (during The Monster Ball Tour)
- Mixed at The Mix Room (Burbank, California)
- Mastered at Oasis Mastering (Burbank, California)
- Published by Stefani Germanotta P/K/A Lady Gaga (BMI) Sony ATV songs LLC / House of Gaga Publishing Inc. / GloJoe Music Inc. (BMI) Sony ATV / Warner-Tamerlane Publishing Corp. (BMI) and Garibay Music Publishing (BMI)
- All rights on behalf of itself and Garibay Music Publishing administered by Warner-Tamerlane Publishing Corp.

=== Personnel ===
- Lady Gaga – vocals, songwriter, producer, background vocals
- Fernando Garibay – songwriter, producer, programming, keyboards
- DJ White Shadow – drum programming
- Dave Russell – recording, audio mixing
- Gene Grimaldi – audio mastering
- Eric Morris – assistant
- Paul Pavao – assistant

== Charts ==
=== Weekly charts ===
Weekly chart performance for "Marry the Night"
Chart (2011–2014)	Peak position
Australia (ARIA)	80
Australia Dance (ARIA)	18
Austria (Ö3 Austria Top 40)	13
Belgium (Ultratip Bubbling Under Flanders)	1
Belgium (Ultratop 50 Wallonia)	38
Brazil (Billboard Brasil Hot 100)	24
Canada Hot 100 (Billboard)	11
Canada CHR/Top 40 (Billboard)	8
Canada Hot AC (Billboard)	9
CIS Airplay (TopHit)	183
Croatia International Airplay (HRT)	4
Czech Republic Airplay (ČNS IFPI)	37
Finland Download (Latauslista)	28
France (SNEP)	50
Germany (GfK)	17
Hungary (Rádiós Top 40)	9
Ireland (IRMA)	24
Italy (FIMI)	40
Japan (Japan Hot 100)	51
Lebanon (The Official Lebanese Top 20)	16
Mexico (Billboard Mexican Airplay)	18
Netherlands (Dutch Top 40 Tipparade)	9
Poland (Polish Airplay TV)	4
Scottish Singles Sales (Official Charts)	8
Slovakia Airplay (ČNS IFPI)	7
South Korean International Singles Chart	11
Switzerland (Schweizer Hitparade)	34
UK Singles (Official Charts)	16
Ukraine Airplay (TopHit)	59
US Billboard Hot 100	29
US Adult Pop Airplay (Billboard)	27
US Dance Club Songs (Billboard)	1
US Dance Airplay (Billboard)	12
US Pop Airplay (Billboard)	14

Weekly chart performance for "Marry the Night (Adam Lambert version)"
Chart (2013)	Peak position
US Pop Digital Songs (Billboard)	39

Weekly chart performance for "Marry the Night (Kylie Minogue cover)"
Chart (2021)	Peak position
US Hot Dance/Electronic Songs (Billboard)	24

=== Year-end charts ===
2011 year-end chart performance for "Marry the Night"
Chart (2011)	Position
UK Singles (Official Charts)	161

2012 year-end chart performance for "Marry the Night"
Chart (2012)	Position
Brasil Billboard Hot Pop Songs	7
Canada (Canadian Hot 100)	84
Hungarian Airplay Chart	95
US Dance Club Songs (Billboard)	47

2013 year-end chart performance for "Marry the Night"
Chart (2013)	Position
Finnish Foreign Singles Chart	17

== Certifications and sales ==
Certifications and sales for "Marry the Night"
Region	Certification	Certified units/sales
Australia (ARIA)	Platinum	70,000^{‡}
Brazil (Pro-Música Brasil)	3× Platinum	180,000^{‡}
United Kingdom (BPI)	Silver	290,000
United States (RIAA)	Platinum	1,000,000^{‡}
^{‡} Sales+streaming figures based on certification alone.

== Release history ==
Release dates and formats for "Marry the Night"
Region	Date	Format(s)	Version(s)	Label(s)	Ref.
Italy	November 11, 2011	Radio airplay	Original	Universal	
United States	November 15, 2011	Contemporary hit radio	Original	Streamline; KonLive; Interscope	
United States	November 15, 2011	Rhythmic contemporary radio	Original	Streamline; KonLive; Interscope	
France	November 18, 2011	Radio airplay	Original	Universal	
United Kingdom	November 30, 2011	7-inch picture disc	Remixes (Note: The Weeknd & Illangelo remix of the song serves as an A-side, while the B-side is Totally Enormous Extinct Dinosaurs 'Marry Me' remix.)	Streamline; KonLive; Interscope	
Germany	December 2, 2011	CD single	Original	Interscope	
Various	December 20, 2011	Digital download; streaming	Remixes	Streamline; KonLive; Interscope	

== See also ==
- List of Billboard Dance Club Songs number ones of 2012
- List of number-one pop hits of 2012 (Brazil)
