= Government Hooker =

- Vinyl box set picture disc cover

Song by Lady Gaga

from the album Born This Way
- Released: May 23, 2011
- Recorded: 2010
- Studio: Studio at the Palms (Las Vegas)
- Genre: Synth-pop
- Length: 4:14
- Label: Streamline; Interscope; KonLive
- Songwriters: Lady Gaga; Fernando Garibay; Paul Blair aka DJ White Shadow
- Producers: Lady Gaga; Paul Blair aka DJ White Shadow

Audio video
- "Government Hooker" on YouTube

"Government Hooker" is a song by American singer Lady Gaga from her second studio album, Born This Way (2011). Gaga wrote the song with Fernando Garibay and DJ White Shadow; it was produced by Gaga and DJ White Shadow, with co-production by Garibay and DJ Snake. "Government Hooker" was a previously unused demo track Shadow had produced with DJ Snake. Recording sessions took place in 2010 at the Studio at the Palms in Las Vegas, Nevada.

The song is a synth-pop track with techno, trance, post-disco, and industrial influences. "Government Hooker" explores themes of female sexual empowerment, manifested as a metaphor referencing US president John F. Kennedy's alleged affair with Marilyn Monroe. Critics praised the song's production and dark, risqué subject matter. Though never released as a single, "Government Hooker" charted in South Korea and peaked at number sixteen on the US Hot Dance/Electronic Digital Songs. The song was performed majorly in Gaga's Born This Way Ball concert tour (2012–2013); it was also part of the setlist of her Las Vegas residency, Enigma (2018–2020).

== Background ==
"Government Hooker" is a collaborative effort between Gaga, Fernando Garibay, and DJ White Shadow. Recording sessions took place in 2010 at the Studio at the Palms in Las Vegas, Nevada. "Government Hooker" was a previously unused demo recording DJ White Shadow had produced with DJ Snake. After Shadow edited the song's tempo, he played the demo for Vince Herbert at a recording session, which he enjoyed more than the other tracks presented at that time. Gaga began writing verses for "Government Hooker" immediately after being sent the recording. While writing, the production team recruited her bodyguard, Peter van der Veen, to sing lyrics aloud rather than use processed vocals. Shadow noticed van der Veen's thick, distinctive Dutch accent as he sang the verses. Alongside "Scheiße" and a remix of "Born This Way", "Government Hooker" premiered at a Thierry Mugler fashion show in Paris, France, on March 2, 2011, as Gaga made her runway debut.

== Composition ==
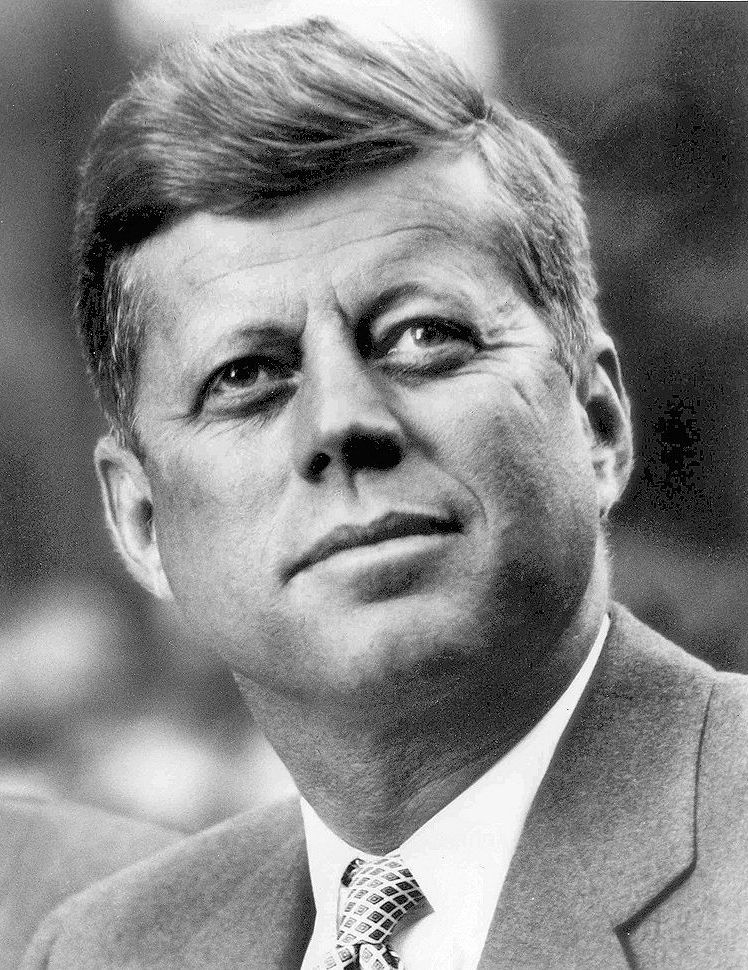
Monroe's alleged romance with US president John F. Kennedy (pictured) was referenced in the song.

"Government Hooker" is an uptempo synth-pop song with elements of trance, techno, post-disco, and industrial music. Los Angeles Times columnist Randall Roberts heard it as an homage to the German electronic group Kraftwerk, and noted "weird Casio-tone circuit-bending". To Evan Sawdey of PopMatters, the song contained amalgamated elements of Britney Spears' "Gimme More" (2007) and the New Order song "Blue Monday" (1983). According to the music sheet published by Sony/ATV Music Publishing on Musicnotes.com, "Government Hooker" is written in the time signature of common time, with a moderate tempo of 120 beats per minute. It is composed in the key of F♯ minor. Gaga's voice spans the tonal nodes of F♯_{3} to C♯_{5}. The song has a basic sequence of D–F♯m–D–F♯m during the verses, B–D–A–E during the bridge and Bm–F♯m–Bm–F♯m during the chorus, as its chord progression. The song primarily explores themes of female sexual empowerment.

"Government Hooker" begins as Gaga sings in a dramatic, operatic style—backed by industrial synthesizers—before progressing to a Gregorian chant. The song then descends into the chorus: "I can be good / I can be sex / I can be anything / I can be everything / Just touch me baby." A supporting male vocalist responds, "Unless you want to be man / Unless you want to hold hands / I don't wanna be sad." After Gaga sings "I'm gonna drink my tears and cry / 'cos I know you love me baby" during the techno-inspired bridge, she alludes to the alleged affair between Marilyn Monroe and John F. Kennedy with the lyrics "Put your hands on me / John F. Kennedy / I'll make you squeal baby", singing in a monotonous, yet seductive tone.

== Reception ==
"Government Hooker" was well received by the media. Sal Cinquemani of Slant Magazine described it as "filthy-fabulous", while Jocelyn Vena of MTV called the song a "massive club track". Kristen S. Hé of Vulture felt "Government Hooker" would be "the perfect soundtrack for a military-industrial-themed fashion show on Mars, with buzz-saw synthesizers as sharp as Gaga's prosthetic cheekbones." Randall Roberts of Los Angeles Times asserted that the song's dynamic was a quirky exception to the contravening nature of Born This Way. Chris Richards of The Washington Post chose the song as a highlight on the album commenting that "The Edge of Glory" makes a song like 'Government Hooker' seem much more daring than it actually is". Caryn Ganz of Spin said that Lady Gaga's eccentric and outlandish persona—the so-called "nutty come-ons"—were apparent in the "grimy doom disco" of "Government Hooker". Christian Blauvelt of Entertainment Weekly described the song's chorus as "an infectious raver with a killer hook [and it] is pretty irresistible."

Writing for The Independent, Adam White wrote, "nothing will ever sound as sticky and sweet" as "Government Hooker", which he described as "pure chaos". He highlighted the chorus "that sounds like a duet between Edith Piaf and a sex robot."" Rolling Stone journalist Jody Rosen felt that the production of the "requisite kinky song" was captivating, including its "shape-shifting assemblage of buzzes, beeps and clattering beats". Dan Martin of NME wrote that "Government Hooker" is inimical to the campy nature of the album, and felt that as the track starts, Born This Way effectively transcends into "claustrophobic" techno beats. "This is freeform and industrial and quite mad", Martin noted. Billboard writer Kerri Mason said that the track has "opera vocalizing, minimal techno bleeps, a JFK reference, and conflicting definitions of self as seductive product". To Ian Wade of BBC Music, the eerie operatic entrance of "Government Hooker" gives way to a "Casiotone throb". Evan Sawdey of PopMatters commended the sexual lyrics of the song, and insisted that the "gender-bending" chorus was the best since The Killers' "Somebody Told Me".

Despite not being released as a single, "Government Hooker" entered the charts in two countries: In South Korea, the song debuted at number fifteen on the Gaon Digital Chart selling 13,976 copies, while in the United States, "Government Hooker" debuted and peaked at number sixteen on the Billboard Hot Dance/Electronic Digital Songs.

== Live performances and media usage ==
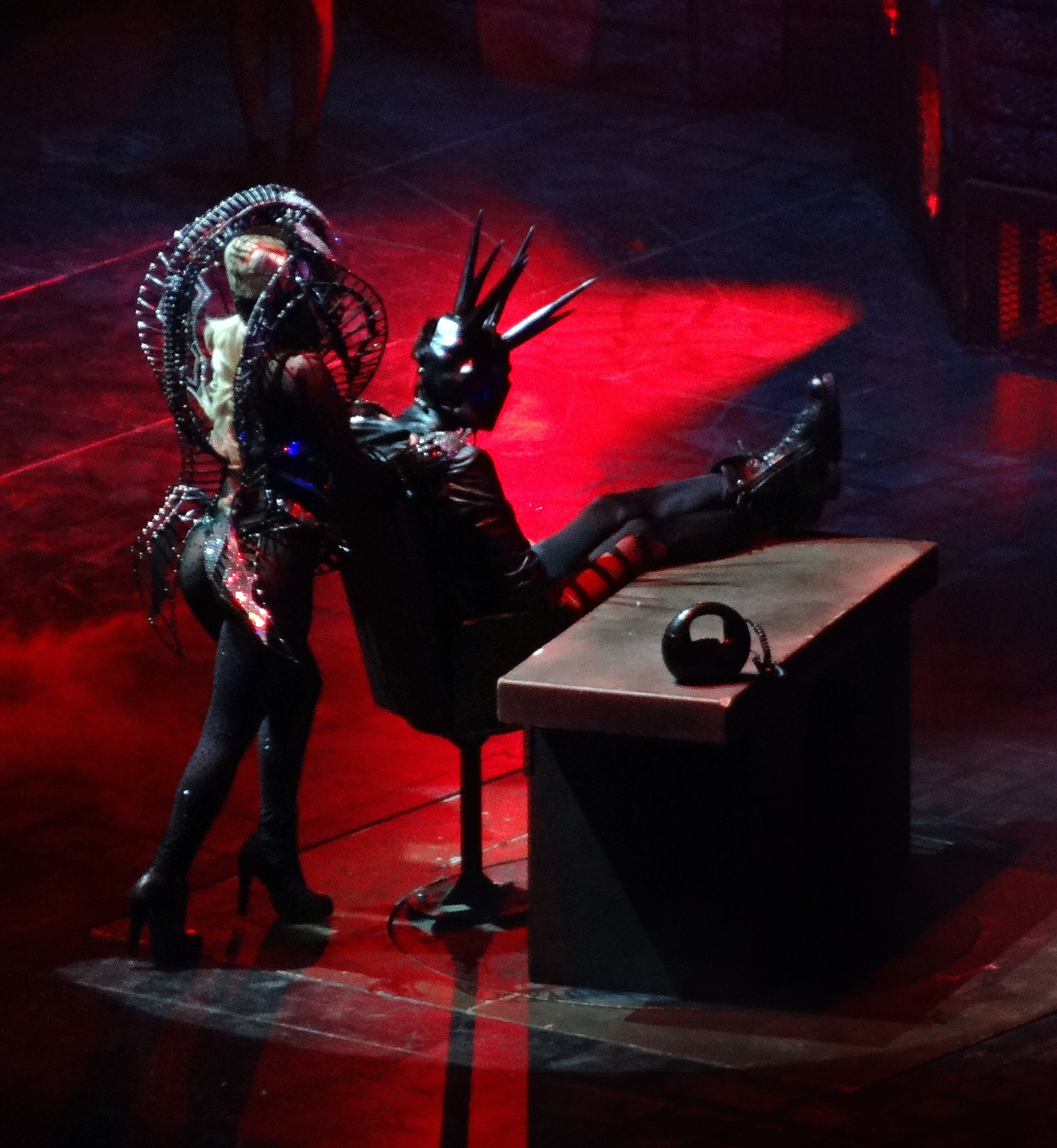
Gaga performing "Government Hooker" on the Born This Way Ball tour

In October 2011, Gaga performed "Government Hooker" at the Clinton Foundation's Decade of Difference celebration at the Hollywood Bowl in Los Angeles, California. The song was featured in a promotional video for the 2011 MTV Video Music Awards on August 18, 2011.

"Government Hooker" was included on the setlist of the Born This Way Ball, Gaga's third headlining tour (2012–2013). The song was performed as the second song in the setlist, after "Highway Unicorn (Road to Love)". Following a brief interlude, Gaga appeared from one of the doors of the big castle prop on the stage, wearing an Alien-esque outfit, and walked down the steps. She then appeared to take part in a sexual routine with one of her dancers. During the breakdown, Gaga pulled a gun out of a drawer and pretended to shoot the dancer. She performed the song's chorus one more time before telling the crowd, "Welcome to the Born This Way Ball", and 'shooting' the castle gates open.

Gaga later performed "Government Hooker", for the first time in nearly six years, during her Las Vegas residency show, Enigma (2018–2020). The track followed a medley of fellow Born This Way tracks, "Scheiße" and "Judas", and showed Gaga wearing an illuminated armor-like bodysuit with a blue, anime-inspired wig. She performed vogue-like choreography before segueing into a cover of David Bowie's 1997 single, "I'm Afraid of Americans". During "Government Hooker", Gaga changed the song's lyrics to address the Trump administration ("I'll make you squeal baby/Donald Trump, if you pay me.")

== Credits and personnel ==
Credits adapted from the liner notes of Born This Way.

- Lady Gaga – vocals, songwriter, producer, background vocals
- Fernando Garibay – songwriter, co-producer, programming, keyboards; recording at Studio at the Palms, Las Vegas, Nevada
- DJ White Shadow – songwriter, producer, programming, keyboards, guitars
- DJ Snake – co-producer, bass guitar, drums, keyboards
- Kareem "Jesus" Devlin – guitars
- Peter Van Der Veen – background vocals
- Josh Thomas – background vocals, co-producer
- Brian Lee – background vocals
- Bill Malina – additional recording
- Dave Russell – audio mixing at The Mix Room, Burbank, California
- Gene Grimaldi – audio mastering at Oasis Mastering, Burbank, California
- Paul Pavao – assistant

== Charts ==
Weekly chart performance for "Government Hooker"
Chart (2011)	Peak position
South Korean International Singles (Gaon)	15
US Dance/Electronic Digital Songs (Billboard)	16
