= Lady Gaga Enigma + Jazz & Piano =

2018–2024 concert residency in Las Vegas

- Residency by Lady Gaga
- Promotional posters for Enigma (top) and Jazz & Piano (bottom)
- Location: Paradise, Nevada, United States
- Venue: Dolby Live at Park MGM
- Start date: Enigma: December 28, 2018; Jazz & Piano: January 20, 2019
- End date: Enigma: December 30, 2019; Jazz & Piano: July 6, 2024
- Legs: 8
- No. of shows: 72 (Note: 24 Enigma shows, and 48 Jazz & Piano shows. Gaga also presented five private-hire Enigma shows outside of Las Vegas; these are not part of the residency.)
- Attendance: 376,652
- Box office: $110 million
- Website: vegas.ladygaga.com

Lady Gaga concert chronology
- Joanne World Tour (2017–2018); Lady Gaga Enigma + Jazz & Piano (2018–2024); The Chromatica Ball (2022)
Lady Gaga concert residency chronology
Lady Gaga Live at Roseland Ballroom (2014)	Lady Gaga Enigma + Jazz & Piano (2018–2024)

Lady Gaga Enigma + Jazz & Piano was a concert residency by American singer-songwriter Lady Gaga held at Dolby Live on the Las Vegas Strip in Paradise, Nevada. The residency featured two distinct shows: Enigma, a theatrical extravaganza highlighting Gaga's biggest hits, and Jazz & Piano, which included songs from the Great American Songbook as well as stripped-down versions of her own material. Enigma ran from its debut on December 28, 2018, to its finale on December 30, 2019, while Jazz & Piano opened on January 20, 2019, and continued across multiple legs—pausing for a 21-month COVID-19 hiatus—until its final performance on July 6, 2024.

The Enigma show was complimented for its theatricality and Gaga's showmanship, although some reviewers found it disjointed, and deemed the narrative confusing and unnecessary. The Jazz & Piano concerts were critically acclaimed – journalists found them a nostalgic throwback to the "Golden Age" of Las Vegas, and praised Gaga's vocal skills. The combined performance of the two shows made Gaga's the highest grossing Las Vegas Valley concert residency of 2019. By the residency's end, Gaga became the fourth woman to cross the $100 million threshold for a single residency engagement.

== Background and announcement ==
In December 2017, Lady Gaga announced her two-year Las Vegas Valley residency at Dolby Live (Note: Previously Park Theater until October 2021.) at Park MGM, starting in December 2018. The deal was reportedly worth $100 million and included 74 performances with a possible extension. In July 2018, Ticketmaster website had mistakenly uploaded details about a "2 Show Bundle" for the residency with tentative name as Enigma and ticket sales from the end of that month. The link was quickly removed.

The residency was finally announced on August 7, 2018. Initially 27 dates were enclosed, starting from December 28, 2018, to November 9, 2019. Two different shows were listed with the press release, with Enigma described as a "brand-new odyssey of [Gaga's] pop hits built as an experience unlike any other," and Jazz & Piano painted as featuring stripped-down versions of her songs accompanied by tracks from the Great American Songbook. Lady Gaga described the show as "unlike anything I've done before. It will be a celebration of all that is unique and different within us. The challenges of bravery can be overcome with creativity and courage that is grown out of adversity, love and music." Five additional dates were added to the itinerary for Jazz & Piano.

== Development and promotion ==
The residency was developed while Gaga was promoting her 2018 film A Star is Born, leaving limited time for the creative process. Billboard highlighted that her decision to present two shows with distinct musical identities marked an innovation for Las Vegas, as the format had not been attempted by previous headliners.

"I've always hated the stigma around Las Vegas—that it's where you go when you're on the last leg of your career. Being a Las Vegas girl is an absolute dream for me. It's really what I've always wanted to do."

— Gaga talking with Vogue before the residency commenced

Gaga released a promotional poster in day-glo colors to accompany the announcement. She wore a neon green tulle dress by designers Laurence & Chico, with latex gloves and a swim cap from Vex Clothing. The image was photographed by Inez and Vinoodh and styled by Gaga's longtime collaborator Nicola Formichetti. Matt Moen from Paper Mag felt that the poster hearkened back to Gaga's fashion choices during The Fame Monster (2009) era, suggesting the singer's return to avant-garde looks. He also found Las Vegas EDM and rave influences in the poster, likening it to an Electric Daisy Carnival. On December 4, 2018, Gaga shared a video from the rehearsal on her Instagram account showing her in a bodysuit with dots on it, utilizing motion capture while the song "Aura" played in the background.

Coinciding with the residency, in May 2019, an exhibition called Haus of Gaga: Las Vegas also opened in Park MGM. It included forty pieces of clothing and accessories from Gaga's personal archive, including her bodysuit from the 2009 MTV Video Music Awards, custom Alexander McQueen lace gown worn in the "Alejandro" music video, and her meat dress. In 2023, the museum was updated with pieces from collaborative projects with her longtime duet partner Tony Bennett, including the Cheek to Cheek Tour (2014–2015) and the One Last Time: An Evening with Tony Bennett and Lady Gaga performances (2021), as well as The Chromatica Ball tour (2022).

In 2020, Gaga was forced to cancel every show of the residency due to the COVID-19 pandemic. The Enigma part of the show ultimately did not return, while the Jazz & Piano shows resumed in 2021 across multiple legs, ultimately concluding in 2024. During its 2023 leg, Gaga introduced a Playbill program for Jazz & Piano attendees, featuring personal reflections on her connection to jazz music and acknowledging the influence of Tony Bennett. Across its full run, the residency comprised 72 performances, including 48 Jazz & Piano shows and 24 Enigma shows. Gaga also presented condensed, invitation-only versions of her Enigma show at select venues outside Las Vegas between 2019–20. Gaga's Super Saturday Night concert, held on February 1, 2020, in Miami a day before Super Bowl LIV, was livestreamed by AT&T.

== Production ==
=== Conception and stage ===
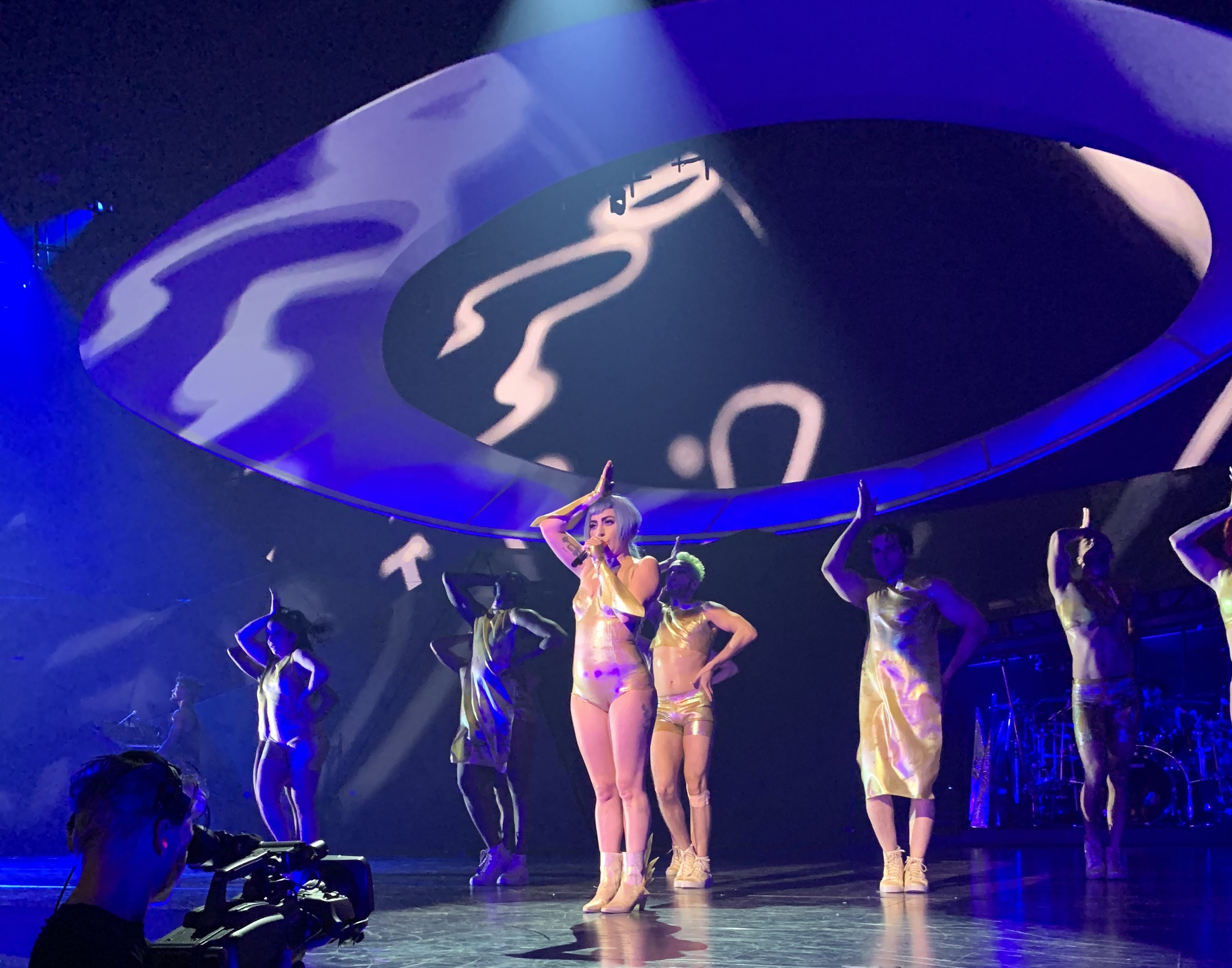
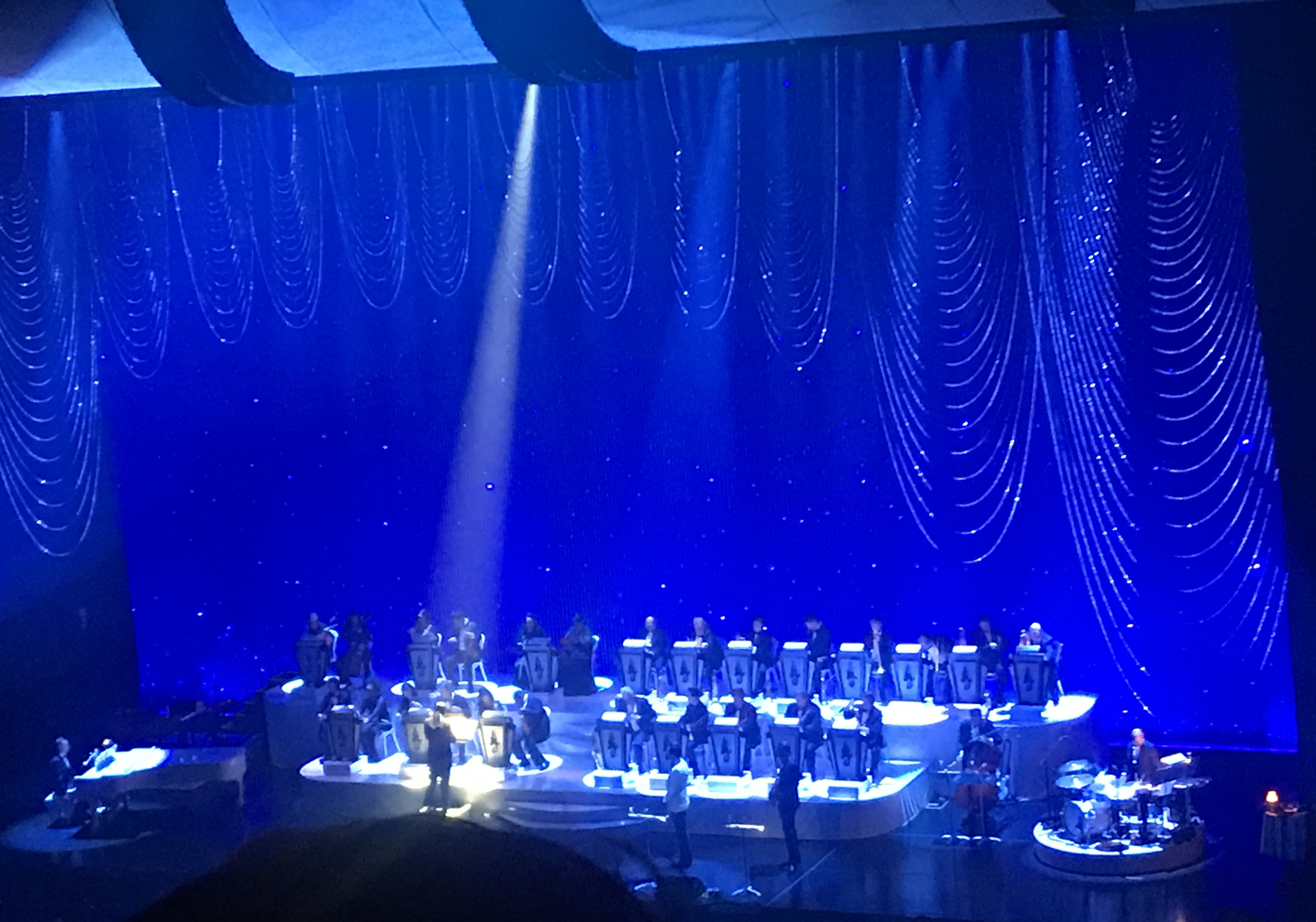
The floating light pod behind Gaga and her dancers at Enigma (top), and the crystal-bead backdrop over the band at Jazz & Piano (bottom)

The Enigma show involves a loose storyline about "healing and finding yourself", with a setting aiming to emulate a post-apocalyptic punk environment. A script was written by Gaga, with photographer Eli Russell Linnetz largely contributing to the creative part of the show, as well. Billboard's Andreas Hale found the narrative "part Wizard of Oz and part Ghost in the Shell." Gaga wanted to integrate all her past hits into the show, while also giving it "a new feel for her interpretation of a Vegas show." The gig involves a character named Enigma, based on Petga, an animated alter ego Gaga used during the promotional campaign for her 2013 album Artpop. Enigma was brought to life through motion capture by Gaga, serving as a virtual focal point on stage with which she interacted throughout the performance, playing a central role in the show's storyline. In a video posted on her social media before the residency kicked off, Gaga referred to Enigma as her alter ego. Production designer LeRoy Bennett described the show as a journey in which Gaga and her Enigma character explore themselves across different settings, blending past, present, and future. The production also featured large-scale stage props, including a robot-like structure used during a performance. Bennett, who had previously collaborated with Gaga on projects such as the Joanne World Tour (2017–2018) and her Super Bowl LI halftime show, described her approach to live performances as narrative-driven, with each production conceived as a cohesive journey. Above the stage floated a large light pod, which served as the main lighting element and according to Bennett, could represent a spaceship, a cloud, or a beam of energy intended to heal Gaga. The rest of the lighting was arranged on multiple trusses and key positions around the set, including lights behind and beside the stage and on the balcony rail and the front of house area, to illuminate the band and dancers.

For the Jazz & Piano show, Gaga aimed for "glamour and elegance". It features a stage illuminated by neon colors, a curtain, and a backdrop consisting of dangling Swarovski crystals. The 30-piece band was arranged in booths styled after traditional jazz-club seating, set on elevated platforms, which were decorated with stylized Art Deco music stands, creating a vintage jazz-club appearance. LeRoy Bennett called it an extension of Gaga's joint concert series with Tony Bennett, the Cheek to Cheek Tour, adding that the "simple, but beautiful" concept transformed the venue into a jazz lounge. As part of the show's emphasis on intimacy, three small tables were placed directly on the stage for select audience members who purchased premium ticket packages. Gaga frequently interacted with the guests seated there during the performance, including occasionally drinking from their champagne glasses.

=== Costume design ===
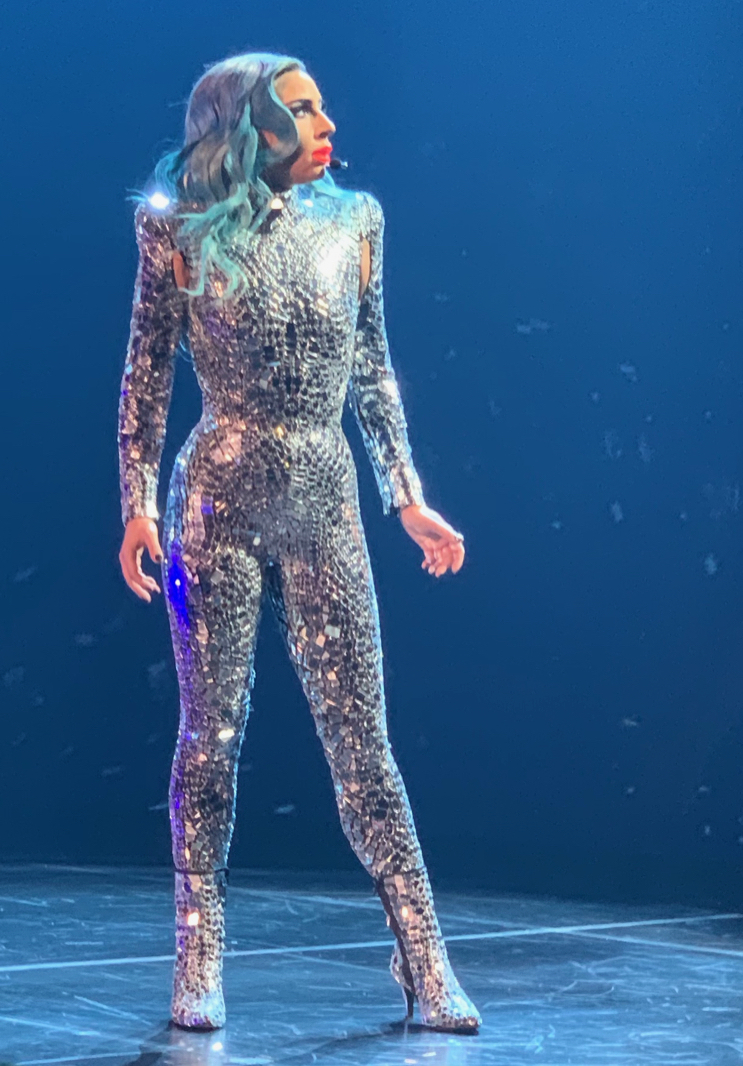
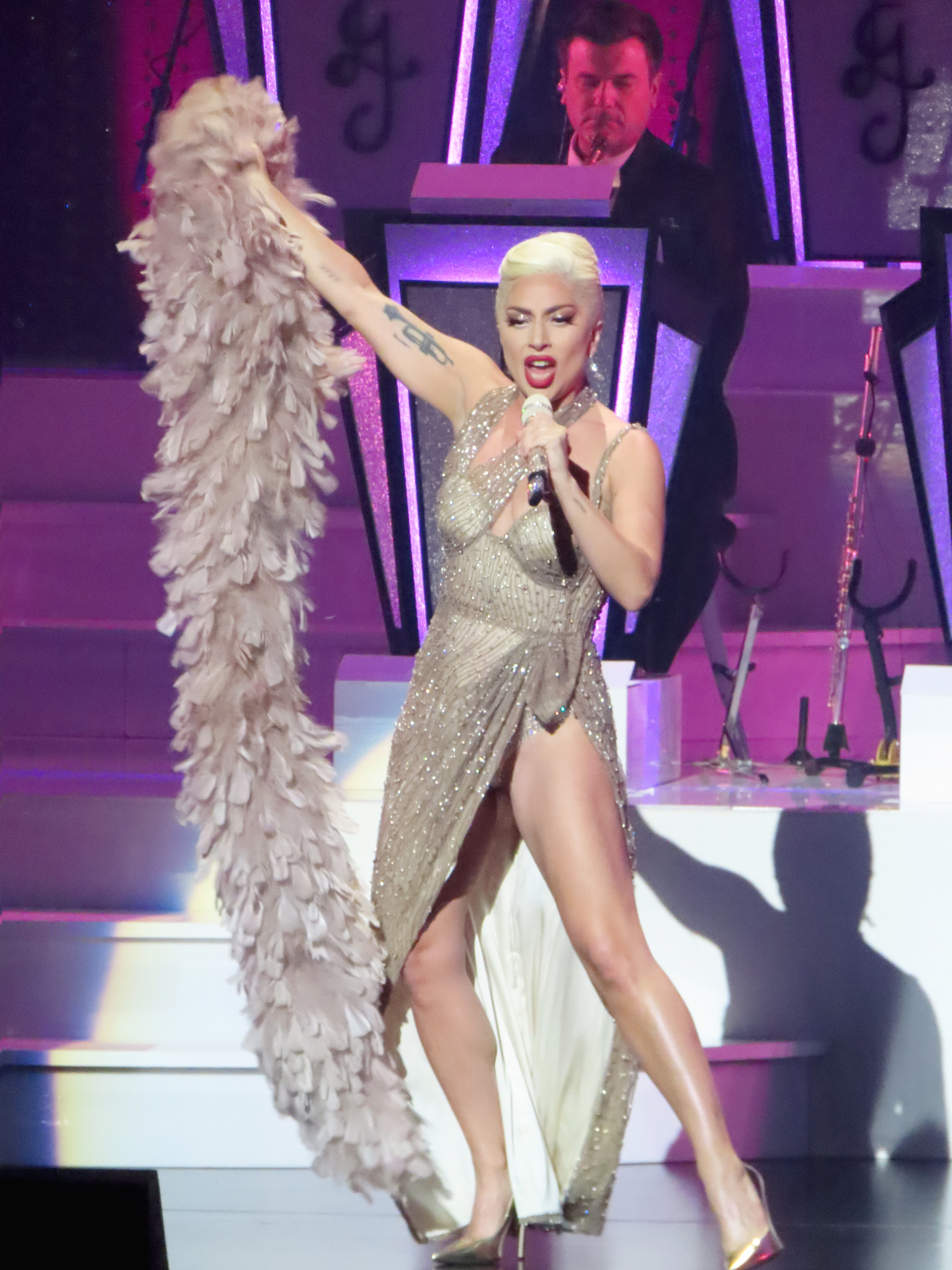
Gaga wearing an outfit covered in tiny mirrors during Enigma (left), and a shimmering rhinestone gown at her Jazz & Piano show (right)

Gaga worked with Nicola Formichetti on selecting the various outfits for the residency. For the Enigma show, the main inspiration was sci-fi, and the list of designers included Tom Ford, Asher Levine, and Vex Latex. Gaga's first look is a bejeweled, silver catsuit with built-in heeled boots, along with a black headpiece. The outfit was covered in tiny mirrors, with Out magazine's Glenn Garner noting that "given her nightlife roots, it's fitting that she's channeling a disco ball at the beginning of her show". Gaga then changed into a BDSM-inspired leather corset with neon green details. It was completed with a black PVC jacket with her initials written on the back side of it, featuring feathers in the same fluorescent green. A later look was an armor-inspired suit with light-up panels, which received comparison to a Patricia Field costume "for a movie about a late '80s heavy metal singer". Gaga also appeared in a transparent purple dress, with a metallic purple cut-out bodysuit underneath. For the finale, she was wearing a champagne-hued gold latex bodysuit with a collar which created the illusion of wings. Out's Garner compared it to outfits from The Fifth Element and ones worn by David Bowie. Removing the ensemble revealed a second-skin like, nude-colored unitard.

Designers who outfitted the Jazz & Piano shows include Ralph Lauren, Schiaparelli, Adrian Manceras, Armani Privé, and Gaga's sister, Natali Germanotta. According to Germanotta, during their creative process they used "elements from the Jazz Age, mixed with cabaret and vintage Vegas." Gaga's first ensemble for the show was a black sequin dress with a deep V neck, slit, crystal appliqués and crystal fringes. The look was completed with a Rinaldy Yunardi headpiece featuring jet-black spikes sprouting from it. For Vogue's Alice Newbold, the headdress resembled the one worn by Cher for the 58th Academy Awards. Gaga changed into a champagne-colored, long-sleeved gown with more than 53,000 Swarovski micro-crytals and 250 rock crystals, along with a white feather cape. Later, a strapless black velvet gown was completed with a hot pink silk floor-length cape, which invoked the "Gentlemen Prefer Blondes-era" for Michael Love Michael of Paper Mag. For the finale, Gaga put on a black lamé tuxedo jumpsuit, with a detachable tiered skirt, embellished with Swarovski crystals, along with white tuxedo shirt, bow, and a top hat. Throughout the gig, Gaga was wearing various Jimmy Choo shoes. Later shows were updated with various new outfits. This includes a dusty rose-hued, feathery dress with an allover ostrich-feather coat; a black velvet bodice with a pink skirt, along with a cape coat with matching pink color; a long shimmering rhinestone gown; and a sparkling tassel dress reminiscent of a 1920s flapper, with matching head gear. In the visuals during Gaga's costume-changes, she is seen in a velvet and lace corset and velvet skirt gown with silver crystal leafs by Turkish designer Nedret Taciroğlu.

== Concert synopsis ==
=== Enigma ===
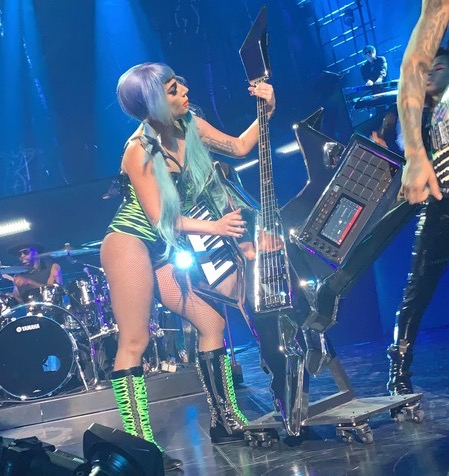
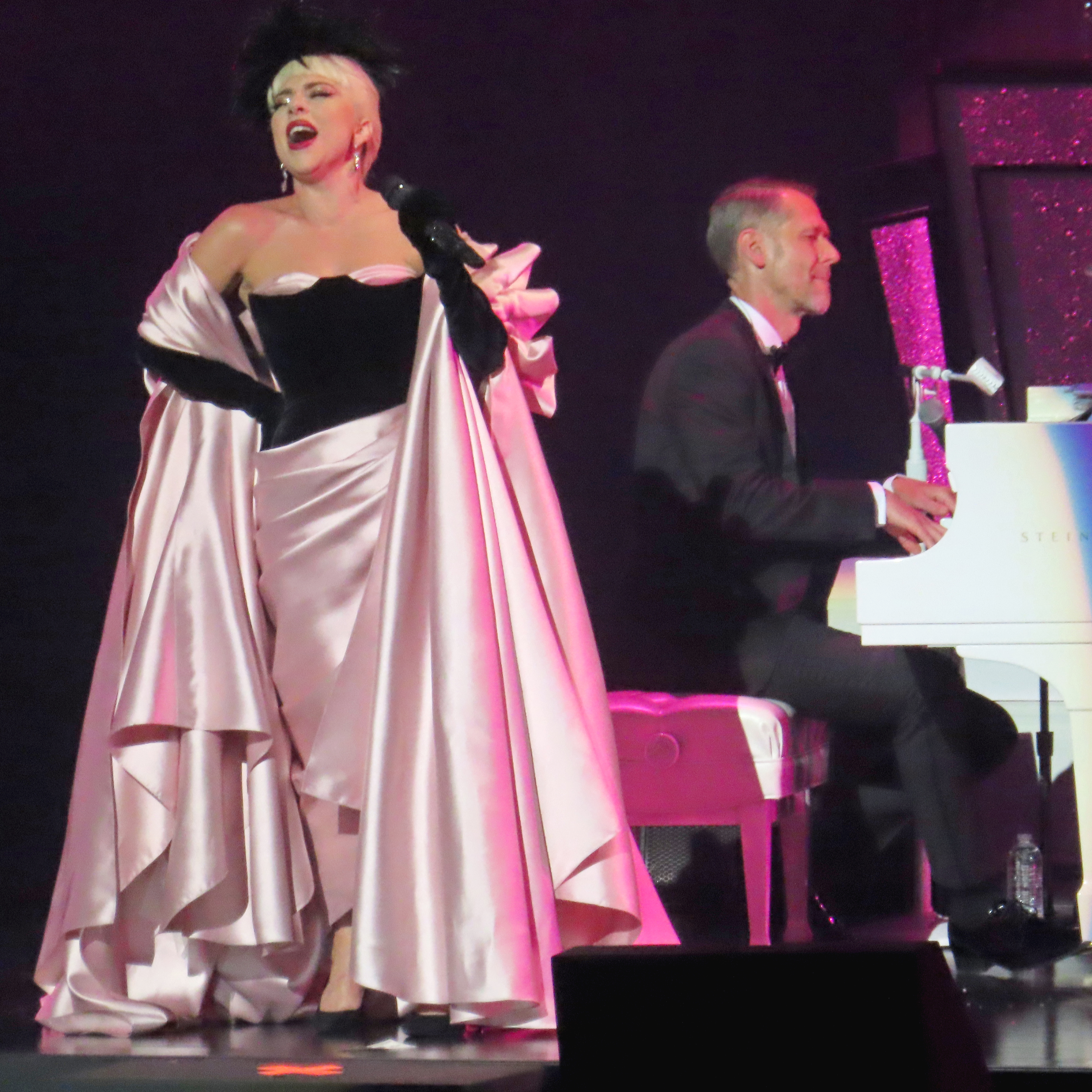
Gaga performing "The Fame" during Enigma (top), and singing "La Vie en rose" at her Jazz & Piano show (bottom)

The Enigma show is approximately two hours long. It starts with an introduction where Enigma, a motion-captured character who is Gaga's alter ego, welcomes the crowd. Shortly after, the singer appears in a sequined jumpsuit, suspended from the ceiling of the theater and performs "Just Dance" as she plays the keytar. After descending to the stage, Gaga and her dancers perform "Poker Face" and "LoveGame". Then, she meets Enigma, who explains to Gaga who she is and that she will show Gaga the future through a simulation.

After an interlude, she returns on stage wearing a fluorescent suit and a manga-inspired wig, and performs "Dance in the Dark" and "Beautiful, Dirty, Rich". Gaga removes her jacket and plays a custom-made instrument featuring a keyboard and guitar strings, while singing "The Fame". After performing "Telephone" and "Applause", Gaga realizes that in the simulation, paparazzi pose a threat and seek to capture her. She performs "Paparazzi" suspended above the stage in an orb-like cage, but shortly afterward, the paparazzi catch her and she performs "Aura" while they torture her. The next act opens with Gaga riding a giant mechanical robot, wearing a light-up futuristic catsuit, while singing "Scheiße". Pyrotechnic effects accompany the performance. The performance transitions into "Judas", in which Gaga performs an extended electric guitar solo. Later, she performs "Government Hooker" with altered lyrics to address the Trump administration. She then covers David Bowie's "I'm Afraid of Americans" while standing inside a circular keyboard console.

Following an interlude in which Enigma tells Gaga that she must heal, "The Edge of Glory" and "Alejandro" are performed, with Gaga dressed in purple. Gaga sits down at a piano at the end of the catwalk to sing "Million Reasons" and "You and I", joined by her guitarists during the latter. The last act opens with "Bad Romance", performed by Gaga in a cream latex suit on the catwalk while the dancers execute the choreography on the main stage. Enigma tells Gaga it is now time for her to leave, but Gaga insists on performing for her one last time. "Born This Way" follows, and after Gaga and her crew leave the stage, she returns to sing "Shallow" at the piano as the encore.

=== Jazz & Piano ===
Unlike the Enigma show, the Jazz & Piano engagement does not follow a comprehensive narrative, but it is divided into four segments, each introduced by a costume change and a short black-and-white video interlude. In these films, Gaga is shown gambling and performing in Las Vegas casinos, as well as dancing with the city skyline behind her. She also speaks directly to the audience, sharing her love of jazz and classic American songs, comparing singing jazz to "receiving a warm hug", and paying tribute to performers who inspired her, including Billie Holiday, Etta James and Dinah Washington.

A typical setlist features sixteen vintage covers alongside four of Gaga's own songs, reimagined with new arrangements. These include a slow gospel-style rendition of "Born This Way", a soul-pop version of "Stupid Love", and a high-energy take on "Paparazzi" with full orchestral backing reminiscent of suspense-movie music. Over time, Gaga has refreshed the setlist with additional numbers, such as "Mambo Italiano", a choice she said was inspired by her film House of Gucci, and selections from her second jazz album Love for Sale, including its title track, introduced as a song "every prostitute in Las Vegas sings". In between songs, Gaga also shares personal stories serving as connective tissue between the performed tracks.

== Critical reception ==
=== Enigma ===
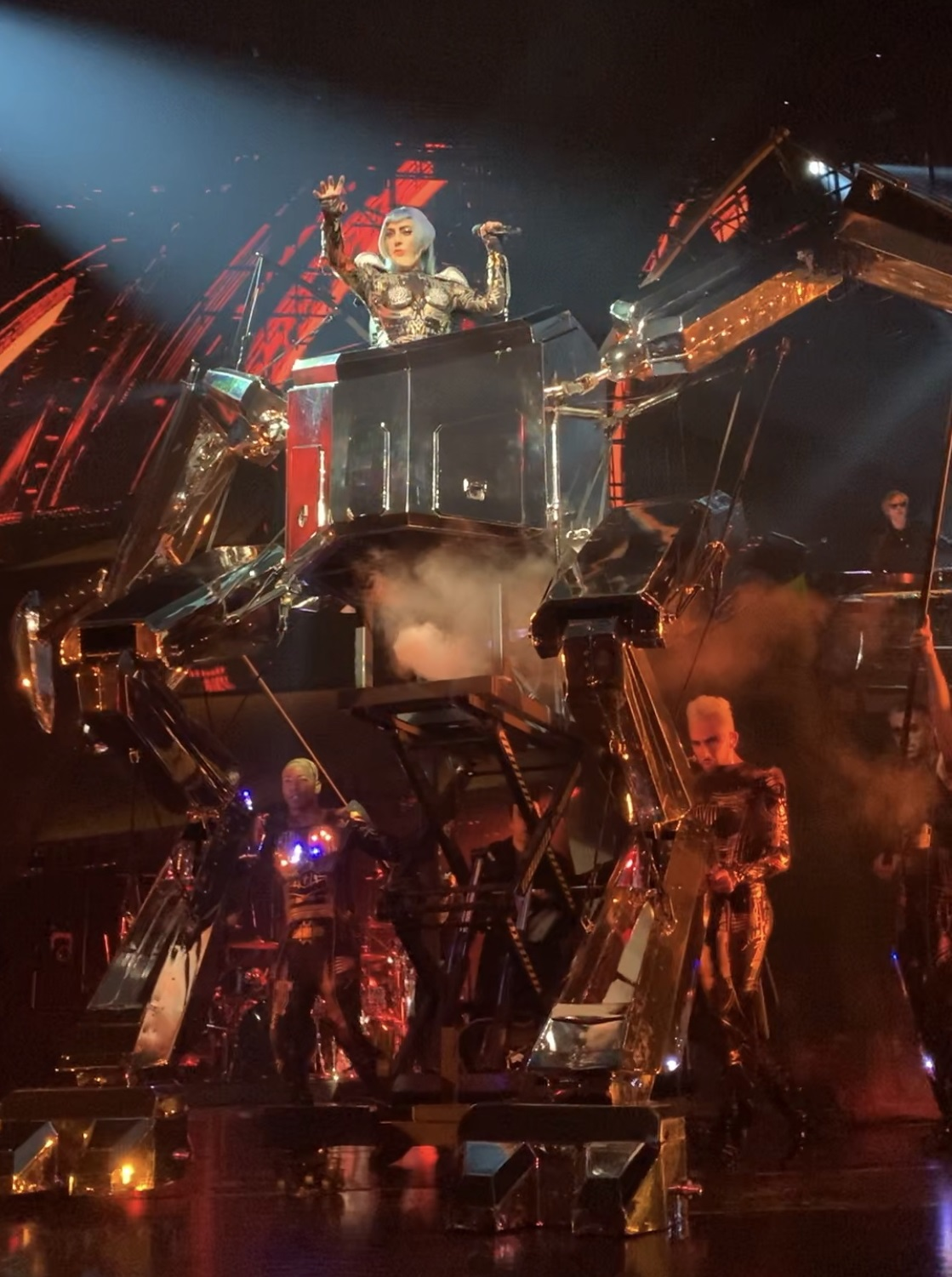
Gaga performing "Scheiße" during her Enigma show

Chris Willman of Variety called the Enigma show a "back-to-roots move for the superstar", as it focused on her "art and artifice of being spectacular", and complimented Gaga for singing live for its entirety. Mark Gray from People thought that the show was "highly energetic", which "lived up to the hype", and praised the theatricality of the show and Gaga's connection with the audience. Andreas Hale from Billboard praised the residency's set pieces as "just as grandiose and over-the-top as the performances themselves" and its "outrageously unique" outfits, concluding that Gaga was born for the Vegas stage. Las Vegas Review-Journal's John Katsilometes praised Gaga's vocal and piano skills, writing that "she is dazzling dancing around the stage" while also showing that "her heartfelt playing on the keyboards shows she can move a crowd subtly." Writing for Rolling Stone, Brittany Spanos praised the setlist's diversity and the creative use of props, while noting that the best moments were those that felt spontaneous. She concluded that Enigma "ended up becoming a show that confirms and begins her legacy". Garrett Martin of Paste described Enigma "one of the most proudly over-the-top concert extravaganzas" he had encountered, and highlighted how its barrage of lights, sound, and pyrotechnics is matched by an underlying sense of pride and inclusivity. He also commended Gaga for delivering a performance marked by genuine warmth and sincerity.

Marc Snetiker of Entertainment Weekly described the production as "rather nutty" overall, yet ultimately a "damn good time", praising its ambition to turn a greatest-hits show into something more purposeful — the kind of creative spark that, he suggested, may have inspired Gaga to take on a Vegas residency at this stage in her career. Randy Lewis from the Los Angeles Times thought that Gaga was "in full pop star mode", and while he appreciated the "gigantic" set pieces and the inclusion of Gaga's biggest hits, he found the show "disjointed", with "little sense of narrative flow". He also added that the choreography "offers little in the way of physical expression or amplification of her songs' lyrics or music", although he noted that it showcased "plenty of wild, kinetic energy". Leslie Ventura of Las Vegas Weekly praised Gaga as an exacting perfectionist with "unparalleled" showmanship, highlighting her powerful vocals, elaborate costumes, choreography, and hit-packed setlist. However, he also felt the show could be overly cheesy, strange, and occasionally confusing, noting that the Enigma concept began to wear thin as the performance went on.

Variety's Jem Aswad reviewed the truncated Enigma concert in New York's Apollo Theater. He complimented the "powerhouse set that brought the house down from its opening moments", as well as Gaga's "remarkable" vocals, while remarking that the scenes where she was talking with her Enigma alter ego were "really silly". Celia Almedia of Miami New Times, who attended another shortened version of the show in Miami, found the story line "hazy at best and sloppy at worst", while noting the piano performances as the "most successful" segment.

=== Jazz & Piano ===
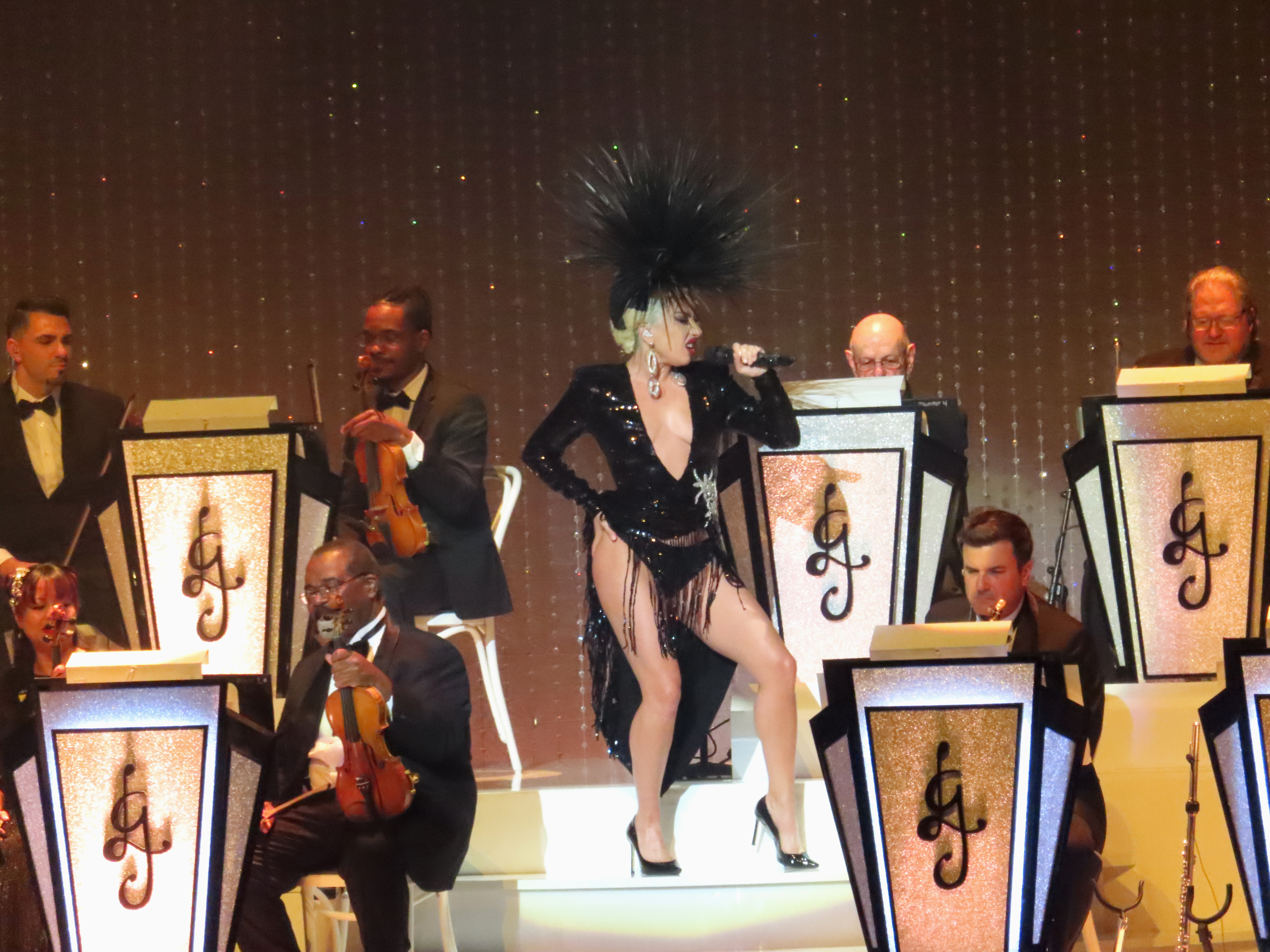
Gaga performing "Luck Be a Lady" during one of the Jazz & Piano shows

Variety magazine journalist Chris Willman thought that the Jazz & Piano arrangement was even better than the singer's other show, calling it "the best shot we're going to get at (...) time travel" as "this show recalls peak Vegas", and complimented the singer's "real emotion" showcased throughout this performance. Mikael Wood from the Los Angeles Times also compared it to Enigma, saying that "for all their differences in style and repertoire, both shows feel indelibly Gaga, linked by the unifying force of her wacky personality and her raw vocal talent." He further noticed, that "for her, the two Vegas performances aren't opposed but complementary — part of the same determination to use artifice to say something real." Kevin Mazur of the Las Vegas Sun called Jazz & Piano "the quintessential Las Vegas show", thinking that "Gaga was mesmerizing all night, both behind the microphone and on the piano", while adding that the full orchestra and the Brian Newman Quintet "was spot-on too".

John Katsilometes of the Las Vegas Review-Journal highlighted Gaga's vocal skills, saying she was "nailing several a cappella moments" during her jazz performances. Writing for Paper Mag, Michael Love Michael also complimented her voice, finding it "full of brightness, nuance, and emotion", while noting that Gaga's performance "brought up instant feelings of nostalgia that continued throughout the show". For Nick Remsen at Vogue, "Jazz & Piano is entertaining, engaging, educational (thanks in part to black and white filmic interludes...), and astutely conceived for power and provocation without being overbearing. Plus, it wholly demonstrates the extraordinary performing prowess and big heart [...] of its star." Las Vegas Weekly's Shannon Miller found the show a "display of outstanding musicianship from Gaga herself and her 30-piece ensemble", where each song is "delivered with improvisation, heartfelt emotion and artistry. Bottom line, Jazz & Piano is a can't miss."

== Commercial performance ==
Pre-sales for the show started on August 8, 2018, for Gaga's fan club members, followed by Citibank credit card holders on the next day, getting an early chance at acquiring the tickets. There was also a pre-sale for MGM members as well as Live Nation and Ticketmaster customers which ran from August 11–12. The next day tickets for the show were available to the general public, including the general bookings and VIP packages for meet-and-greets. IQ magazine reported that the tickets were outselling nearest competitors, those of residencies by artists like Celine Dion and Britney Spears. The sales were also affected by the higher price range of the tickets in the secondary markets.

In February 2019, the first set of boxscores were reported by Billboard. Gaga earned $16 million from the 11 reported sold out dates, which when divided monthwise, resulted in grosses of $4.3 million in December 2018, $8.7 million in January 2019 and $2.9 million in February. Individual show grosses ranged from $1.41–$1.48 million, with the total audience rounding out at 59,162 tickets. According to the magazine's Eric Frankenberg, the total gross was "an electrifying opening pace for Gaga's Vegas residency", since the singer "outperformed" the opening grosses of all previous residencies by other artists—including Christina Aguilera, Britney Spears, Jennifer Lopez, the Backstreet Boys, Shania Twain and Gwen Stefani. With the gross, Gaga also became the fifth woman to pass the half-billion career total as per Billboard Boxscore.

Further box office data released in subsequent years indicated that the residency remained commercially competitive well beyond its initial run, with industry tracking sources reporting that the combined gross of Enigma and Jazz & Piano exceeded $110 million across 72 performances between December 2018 and 2024, with more than 376,000 tickets sold and an average ticket price of approximately $292. The residency ranked eighth among the highest-grossing Las Vegas residencies of all time, placing Gaga ahead of Jennifer Lopez and behind Bruno Mars. She also became the fourth female headliner to surpass $100 million in residency grosses, joining Celine Dion, Jennifer Lopez and Cher.

== Set lists ==
=== Enigma ===
This set list is from the December 28, 2018, concert. It is not intended to represent every show.

1. "Just Dance"
2. "Poker Face"
3. "LoveGame"
4. "Dance in the Dark"
5. "Beautiful, Dirty, Rich"
6. "The Fame"
7. "Telephone"
8. "Applause"
9. "Paparazzi"
10. "Aura"
11. "Scheiße"
12. "Judas"
13. "Government Hooker"
14. "I'm Afraid of Americans"
15. "The Edge of Glory"
16. "Alejandro"
17. "Million Reasons"
18. "You and I"
19. "Bad Romance"
20. "Born This Way"

Encore

21. "Shallow"

Notes

- On December 30, 2018, Gaga dedicated "You and I" to Celine Dion, who was attending the concert that night.
- On January 26, 2019, Bradley Cooper, who was in attendance that night, performed "Shallow" with Gaga.
- At the invite-only, condensed version of the Enigma show outside of Las Vegas, "Beautiful, Dirty, Rich", "The Fame", "Scheiße", "Judas", "Government Hooker", and "I'm Afraid of Americans" were not performed.

=== Jazz & Piano ===
This set list is from the January 20, 2019, concert. It is not intended to represent every show.

1. "Luck Be a Lady"
2. "Anything Goes"
3. "Call Me Irresponsible"
4. "Orange Colored Sky"
5. "Poker Face"
6. "The Lady Is a Tramp"
7. "Cheek to Cheek"
8. "I Can't Give You Anything but Love, Baby"
9. "Someone to Watch Over Me"
10. "Born This Way"
11. "Bang Bang (My Baby Shot Me Down)"
12. "Coquette"
13. "What a Diff'rence a Day Made"
14. "Paparazzi"
15. "La Vie en rose"
16. "Just a Gigolo"
17. "Lush Life"
18. "Bad Romance"
19. "Fly Me to the Moon"

Encore

20. "New York, New York"

Notes

- On January 20, 2019,–the opening night–Gaga performed "Cheek to Cheek" and "The Lady Is a Tramp" with Tony Bennett.
- In 2021, in promotion of her seventh studio album, Love for Sale, Gaga replaced some of the jazz standards with songs from the record ("Love for Sale", "Let's Do It", "Do I Love You", "You're the Top"), while also adding "Rags to Riches" and "Mambo Italiano" to the setlist.
- In 2023, Gaga again revised the setlist, and included the tracks "The Best Is Yet to Come", "Sway", "Steppin' Out with My Baby", "It Don't Mean a Thing (If It Ain't Got That Swing)", and her own "Stupid Love".
- Gaga's own "Americano" was part of the setlist for 2024's shows.

== Shows ==
List of dates, showing the type of show, attendance and revenue earned
Date	Type of show	Attendance	Revenue
December 28, 2018	Enigma	59,162 / 59,162	$15,970,436
December 30, 2018	Enigma	59,162 / 59,162	$15,970,436
December 31, 2018	Enigma	59,162 / 59,162	$15,970,436
January 17, 2019	Enigma	59,162 / 59,162	$15,970,436
January 19, 2019	Enigma	59,162 / 59,162	$15,970,436
January 20, 2019	Jazz & Piano	59,162 / 59,162	$15,970,436
January 24, 2019	Enigma	59,162 / 59,162	$15,970,436
January 26, 2019	Enigma	59,162 / 59,162	$15,970,436
January 31, 2019	Enigma	59,162 / 59,162	$15,970,436
February 2, 2019	Enigma	59,162 / 59,162	$15,970,436
February 3, 2019	Jazz & Piano	59,162 / 59,162	$15,970,436
May 30, 2019	Enigma	48,833 / 48,833	$13,549,061
June 1, 2019	Enigma	48,833 / 48,833	$13,549,061
June 2, 2019	Jazz & Piano	48,833 / 48,833	$13,549,061
June 6, 2019	Enigma	48,833 / 48,833	$13,549,061
June 8, 2019	Enigma	48,833 / 48,833	$13,549,061
June 9, 2019	Jazz & Piano	48,833 / 48,833	$13,549,061
June 12, 2019	Enigma	48,833 / 48,833	$13,549,061
June 14, 2019	Enigma	48,833 / 48,833	$13,549,061
June 15, 2019	Jazz & Piano	48,833 / 48,833	$13,549,061
October 17, 2019	Enigma	60,684 / 60,684	$18,835,571
October 19, 2019	Enigma	60,684 / 60,684	$18,835,571
October 20, 2019	Jazz & Piano	60,684 / 60,684	$18,835,571
October 23, 2019	Enigma	60,684 / 60,684	$18,835,571
October 25, 2019	Enigma	60,684 / 60,684	$18,835,571
October 26, 2019	Jazz & Piano	60,684 / 60,684	$18,835,571
October 31, 2019	Enigma	60,684 / 60,684	$18,835,571
November 2, 2019	Enigma	60,684 / 60,684	$18,835,571
November 3, 2019	Jazz & Piano	60,684 / 60,684	$18,835,571
November 8, 2019	Enigma	60,684 / 60,684	$18,835,571
November 9, 2019	Jazz & Piano	60,684 / 60,684	$18,835,571
December 28, 2019	Enigma	16,340 / 16,340	$5,513,651
December 30, 2019	Enigma	16,340 / 16,340	$5,513,651
December 31, 2019	Jazz & Piano	16,340 / 16,340	$5,513,651
October 14, 2021	Jazz & Piano	44,371 / 44,371	$13,101,365
October 16, 2021	Jazz & Piano	44,371 / 44,371	$13,101,365
October 17, 2021	Jazz & Piano	44,371 / 44,371	$13,101,365
October 21, 2021	Jazz & Piano	44,371 / 44,371	$13,101,365
October 23, 2021	Jazz & Piano	44,371 / 44,371	$13,101,365
October 24, 2021	Jazz & Piano	44,371 / 44,371	$13,101,365
October 28, 2021	Jazz & Piano	44,371 / 44,371	$13,101,365
October 30, 2021	Jazz & Piano	44,371 / 44,371	$13,101,365
October 31, 2021	Jazz & Piano	44,371 / 44,371	$13,101,365
April 14, 2022	Jazz & Piano	46,196 / 46,196	$12,935,506
April 16, 2022	Jazz & Piano	46,196 / 46,196	$12,935,506
April 17, 2022	Jazz & Piano	46,196 / 46,196	$12,935,506
April 21, 2022	Jazz & Piano	46,196 / 46,196	$12,935,506
April 23, 2022	Jazz & Piano	46,196 / 46,196	$12,935,506
April 24, 2022	Jazz & Piano	46,196 / 46,196	$12,935,506
April 28, 2022	Jazz & Piano	46,196 / 46,196	$12,935,506
April 30, 2022	Jazz & Piano	46,196 / 46,196	$12,935,506
May 1, 2022	Jazz & Piano	46,196 / 46,196	$12,935,506
August 31, 2023	Jazz & Piano	58,668 / 60,096	$17,030,118
September 2, 2023	Jazz & Piano	58,668 / 60,096	$17,030,118
September 3, 2023	Jazz & Piano	58,668 / 60,096	$17,030,118
September 6, 2023	Jazz & Piano	58,668 / 60,096	$17,030,118
September 7, 2023	Jazz & Piano	58,668 / 60,096	$17,030,118
September 9, 2023	Jazz & Piano	58,668 / 60,096	$17,030,118
September 10, 2023	Jazz & Piano	58,668 / 60,096	$17,030,118
September 28, 2023	Jazz & Piano	58,668 / 60,096	$17,030,118
September 30, 2023	Jazz & Piano	58,668 / 60,096	$17,030,118
October 1, 2023	Jazz & Piano	58,668 / 60,096	$17,030,118
October 4, 2023	Jazz & Piano	58,668 / 60,096	$17,030,118
October 5, 2023	Jazz & Piano	58,668 / 60,096	$17,030,118
June 19, 2024	Jazz & Piano	42,398 / 42,398	$13,105,553
June 20, 2024	Jazz & Piano	42,398 / 42,398	$13,105,553
June 27, 2024	Jazz & Piano	42,398 / 42,398	$13,105,553
June 29, 2024	Jazz & Piano	42,398 / 42,398	$13,105,553
June 30, 2024	Jazz & Piano	42,398 / 42,398	$13,105,553
July 3, 2024	Jazz & Piano	42,398 / 42,398	$13,105,553
July 5, 2024	Jazz & Piano	42,398 / 42,398	$13,105,553
July 6, 2024	Jazz & Piano	42,398 / 42,398	$13,105,553
Total		376,652 / 378,080 (99.62%)	$110,041,261

== Cancelled dates ==
Cancelled dates for Lady Gaga Enigma + Jazz & Piano
Date	Type of show	Reason	Ref.
November 6, 2019	Enigma	Sinus infection and bronchitis	
April 30, 2020	Enigma	COVID-19 pandemic	
May 2, 2020	Enigma	COVID-19 pandemic	
May 3, 2020	Jazz & Piano	COVID-19 pandemic	
May 7, 2020	Jazz & Piano	COVID-19 pandemic	
May 9, 2020	Enigma	COVID-19 pandemic	
May 10, 2020	Jazz & Piano	COVID-19 pandemic	
May 13, 2020	Enigma	COVID-19 pandemic	
May 15, 2020	Enigma	COVID-19 pandemic	
May 16, 2020	Jazz & Piano	COVID-19 pandemic	

== Private hire Enigma shows ==
Date	Event	Venue
May 9, 2019	SAPPHIRE NOW & ASUG Annual Conference	Amway Center
May 17, 2019	Apple Inc. Headquarters opening	Apple Park
May 20, 2019	Amway's 60th Anniversary	Mandalay Bay Convention Center
June 24, 2019	SiriusXM and Pandora Pride celebration	Apollo Theater
February 1, 2020	AT&T TV Super Saturday Night	Island Gardens' Meridian in Miami

== Personnel ==
=== Live band (Jazz & Piano) ===
Featured performers

- Michael Bearden — conductor
- Brian Newman — trumpet / bandleader
- Alex Smith — piano / organ
- Steve Kortyka — saxophone
- Donald Barrett — drums
- Daniel Foose — bass

Orchestra

Management & Strings

- Joann Tominaga — orchestra manager
- Mark Cargill — concertmaster / violin
- Nicole Garcia — violin
- Lauren Cordell — violin
- Susan Kim — violin
- Juliette Jones — violin
- Shigeru Logan — violin
- Rahmaan Philip — violin
- Naoko Taniguchi — violin
- Tianna Heppner — viola
- John Pollock — viola
- Adrienne Woods — cello
- Moonlight Tran — cello

Brass

- Daniel Falcone — trumpet
- Gil Kaupp — trumpet
- Jason Levi — trumpet
- Rashawn Ross — trumpet
- Curt Miller — trombone
- Nathan Tanouye — trombone
- Neil Maza — trombone
- Kirby Gilbreth — bass trombone

Woodwinds

- Salvadore Lozano — alto sax / flute
- Rob Mader — alto sax / flute
- Eric Tewalt — tenor sax / clarinet
- Rick Keller — tenor sax / clarinet
- Adam Schroeder — baritone sax / bass clarinet

Percussion

- Pepe Jimenez — percussion

=== Technicians ===
- LeRoy Bennett – production, lighting & set designer
- Eli Linnetz – creative direction, co–set design & visuals
- Harry Forster – lighting programmer & director
- Possible Inc. / Michael Figge – video content / creator
- Andy O'Toole – technical advisor
- Solotech – lighting company; video company; rigging company
- Dean Roney – Solotech representative; Solotech video representative; Solotech rigging representative
- Lee Moro – Solotech representative
- Athan Antoniadis – lighting crew chief
- Pete "Lil Pete" Cary, Brad Brown, James Kassabian, Simon Stabenau, Martin Laurendeau – lighting technicians
- Phillip Cabot – tour manager
- Chris Vineyard – production manager
- Alicia Forster – production coordinator / road manager
- Adam Dragosin – stage manager; Solotech video representative
- Steve Fatone, Rob McShane – video directors
- Loren Barton – video programmer
- Benjamin Keightley – disguise programmer
- Joachim Martinez – projectionist
- Matheiu Robert – network technician
- Pyrotek / Reid Derne – pyro & laser company
- Elise Luquette – pyro project manager
- Nigel Deslippe – pyro shooter / crew chief
- Antoine Cholette, Nate King, Gary Bishop (load-in) – pyro technicians
- Victor Tomei – laser project manager
- Brian Van Trigt – laser designer / programmer
- Tom Nasarro – laser operator
- Jack Richards – Solotech rigging representative
- Yanick Blais – rigging / motor technician
- Rosco Smith, Johnny Stebbing – riggers
- Tait / Brian Levine – staging / set company
- Jet Sets / Matthew Pomerantz – props company
- Lonnie Adams, Peter Will, Craig Pica, Erin O’Brien, Jonathan Cordova, John Streeter – carpenters
- John "Badge" Chidley – show caller
- Flying by Foy / Joe McGeough – flying company

== See also ==
- List of highest-grossing concert series at a single venue
