= Scheiße =

- Vinyl box set picture disc cover

Song by Lady Gaga

from the album Born This Way
- Language: English and faux-German
- Released: May 23, 2011
- Recorded: 2010
- Studio: Tour Bus (Europe)
- Genre: Dance-pop; techno; electroclash; Euro disco
- Length: 3:45
- Label: Streamline; Interscope; KonLive
- Songwriters: Lady Gaga; RedOne
- Producers: Lady Gaga; RedOne

Audio video
- "Scheiße" on YouTube

"Scheiße" (German for "shit") is a song by American singer Lady Gaga from her second studio album, Born This Way (2011). The song was written and produced by Lady Gaga and RedOne. It was recorded in Europe on the tour bus during the Monster Ball Tour. "Scheiße" was first introduced as a remix during a Thierry Mugler fashion show held on January 19, 2011. A dance-pop song with heavy, pounding synths, it also has a fast techno beat with electroclash and Eurodisco influences. Gaga speaks the first verse and parts of the chorus of the song in faux-German, as the name of the song is German. The lyrics have a feminist tone, speaking of female empowerment.

The song received positive reviews from contemporary critics, who complimented its heavy dance beat and catchy chorus, despite criticizing the faux-German lyrics and Gaga's accent. The song charted on the South Korean Gaon Music Chart and US Billboard dance charts, as well as entering the component charts in Canada, Germany, and the United States. "Scheiße" was performed during many of Gaga's tours and other concerts, often featuring elaborate choreography and costumes.

== Background ==
The song was written and produced by Lady Gaga and RedOne. It was originally recorded on a tour bus in Europe in 2010, and was later remixed at Larrabee Sound Studios in North Hollywood, California by Trevor Muzzy. Gaga said that the song was inspired after a night of partying at the Lab.oratory nightclub in Berlin, Germany. The next day, she wrote "Scheiße", stating that she "meant [the song] like 'shit, it's good.' But I also meant it the other way; because this song is really about wanting to be a strong female without all the bullshit that comes along with. Anything that gets in your way from being brave. It's not the only word I know, I just like that word. It's sexy."

"Scheiße" was first introduced in a Thierry Mugler fashion show held on January 19, 2011 as a remix; the fashion show also featured Gaga on the runway. It featured a thumping dance beat with snippets of German words. The remix ended with the lyrics, "I'll take you out tonight/say whatever you like." On January 20, 2011, Mugler's creative director Nicola Formichetti premiered a short film featuring a remix of the song. Gaga commented on her website, Littlemonsters.com, that she wanted to release "Scheiße" as a single but her label did not want her to put it out. "Scheiße" was released as part of Gaga's second studio album, Born This Way, on May 23, 2011.

== Composition ==
"Scheiße"
A 22-second sample of "Scheiße", where Gaga sings a verse about female empowerment and then the chorus.

"Scheiße" is a dance-pop song with techno, electroclash, Eurodisco, and Eurodance influences. Andrew Unterberger of PopDust noted that the song was influenced by Madonna's music, notably "Justify My Love," which, like "Scheiße," has sections in which the artist speaks rather than sings. "Scheiße" has been described as "a strange mash up of digestible, American shopping mecca music and the thud of German nightclub electronica." The song features a "grimy" bass and so many "fizzing" synths that it produces a "keyboard assault on the senses."

The song's lyrics are of female empowerment. Although the theme of "Scheiße" is similar to the inspirational theme of other songs on Born This Way, The Village Voice questioned the sincerity of the feminist lyrics, after Gaga had once said, "I’m not a feminist. I hail men, I love men," but calls herself on the song a "blond high-heeled feminist enlisting femmes for this." "[Is this] someone who we’re watching evolve or someone who, at any given point, doesn’t really know what she’s talking about?" the article wrote of Gaga. The German word "scheiße", the title of the song and a word frequently used in the song, translates into "shit" into English. Gaga repeatedly speaks in German-sounding gibberish during the song, although in a French accent.

The song starts with Gaga saying, "I don't speak German, but I can if you like", then immediately launches into a spoken verse in faux-German. She then moves to the hook of the song, "I’ll take you out tonight, say whatever you like, scheiße be mine". Following the hook is a pre-chorus backed by syncopated synths, with influences of techno music. The chorus of the song, in which Gaga includes the word "Scheiße", is backed by "dueling screechy" synths. It is broken up by Gaga repeatedly singing in-between lines "oh oh oh oh oh" in an electronically altered voice. The next verses, containing lyrics of Gaga being a strong woman, are all backed by "growling, guttural" synths, and are mixed with German and English. According to the sheet music published by Hal Leonard Corporation, "Scheiße" is written in the time signature of common time, with a tempo of 131 beats per minute. It is composed on the key of C minor, with Gaga's voice spanning from A_{3} to Eb♯_{5}. The song follows in the sequence of Cm–Cm/Cm–Eb/Gm as its chord progression.

== Critical response ==
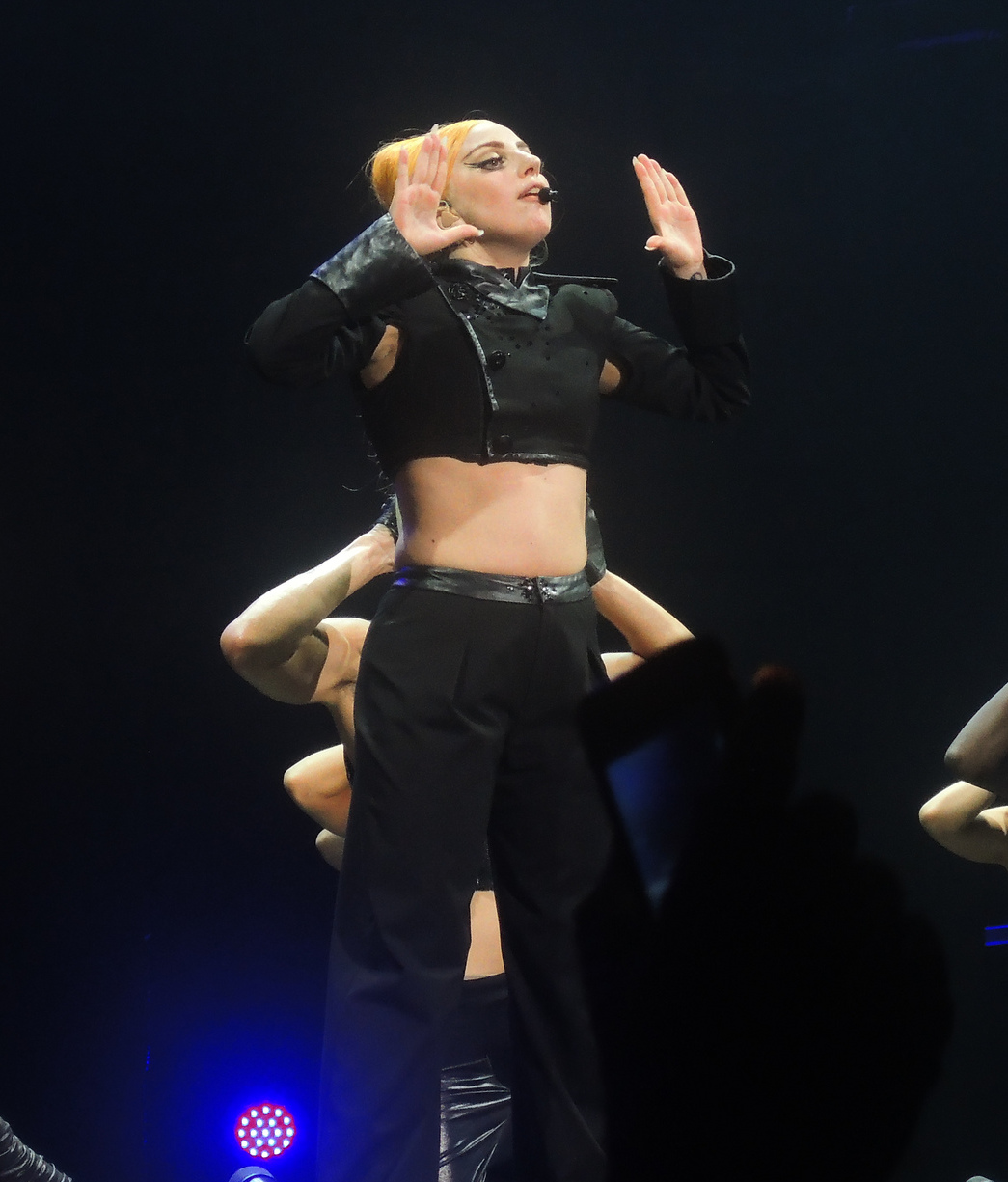
Lady Gaga performing "Scheiße" on the Born This Way Ball tour (2012–2013)

"Scheiße" received positive reviews from critics, with some calling it a highlight of the album. NME's Dan Martin also found "Scheiße" comparable to a Madonna song, saying it "channels Miss Kittin doing a rave take on Madonna’s 'Erotica'," making it a "commanding pop song" and a "triumph". The Village Voice called "Scheiße" a "highlight" of the album, but questioned the sincerity of the feminist lyrics. BBC Music called the song a "monster tune begging for a sex dungeon-themed video event". Kerri Manson of Billboard found the song to be "dated", but strongly praised the chorus. Tim Jonze of The Guardian also found the chorus of the song "ridiculously catchy" and felt it was the most important aspect of the song. He also noticed Berlin techno influences in the song, which were described as "decadent." Rolling Stone's Jody Rosen, however, felt the chorus was "a whisp" and called the song's beat "generic Eurodisco thump". Gaga's faux-German lyrics were criticized by the magazine, which called it "gibberish that sounds German but isn't." Caryn Ganz from Spin called the opening lines of the song ("I don't speak German, but I can if you like") "hilariously ludicrous."

Tris McCall, in New Jersey On-Line, rewarded "Scheiße" as the "song of the week" and recommended it as Gaga's next single from Born This Way, noting it to be "no less absurd" than the previous singles. McCall also noted Gaga's gibberish lyrics and compared them to what a high school student group's version of Cabaret would sound like. He concluded by praising the song's production. Prefixmag's Craig Jenkins said the song, along with album tracks "Bloody Mary" and "Government Hooker", "cuts the karaoke crap and kicks ass on the dance floor" and "eschew[s] Born This Way's time traveling ethos in favor of a more modern approach." Ed Commentale from Tinymixtapes gave a mixed review of the German in the song, saying "the singer is not so much speaking the language of the German people, but updating it for the new millennium, enjoining this nation to move beyond its tragic history into a new era of love and dancing... ['Scheiße'] reveals a certain disregard for both fact and reality." Nathan Heller from Slate compared the song to Mediterranean dance tracks, while declaring it as being "custom-tailored to an international audience". Adam White of The Independent felt that "Scheiße" is "naked pandering to the Berghain crowd, with its gibberish German lyrics and rampant, aggressive absurdity. But it is such a deer-in-the-headlights racket that it transcends any and all cliche."

While reviewing Born This Way The Tenth Anniversary in 2021, Owen Myers of Pitchfork dubbed "Scheiße" "the best non-single of Gaga’s career". The same year, Bianca Gracie of Uproxx listed it between Gaga's best songs, calling it "utter chaos in a way that only Gaga could pull off" and "one of her most liberating tunes".

== Chart performance ==
Despite not having been released as a single, the song entered the charts in different countries. In Germany, "Scheiße" debuted at number 90, after Gaga had included parts of it in her performance at the Germany's Next Topmodel TV show. Following the release of Born This Way, "Scheiße" peaked at number 13 on the International Digital Download chart in South Korea, jumping 21 positions from the previous week. It also peaked at number 136 on the UK Singles Chart, for one week. In the United States, the song reached number 11 on the Bubbling Under Hot 100 Singles chart of Billboard. It also charted at number six on the Dance/Electronic Digital Songs, as well as at number 72 on the Canadian Hot Digital Songs chart.

== Live performances ==
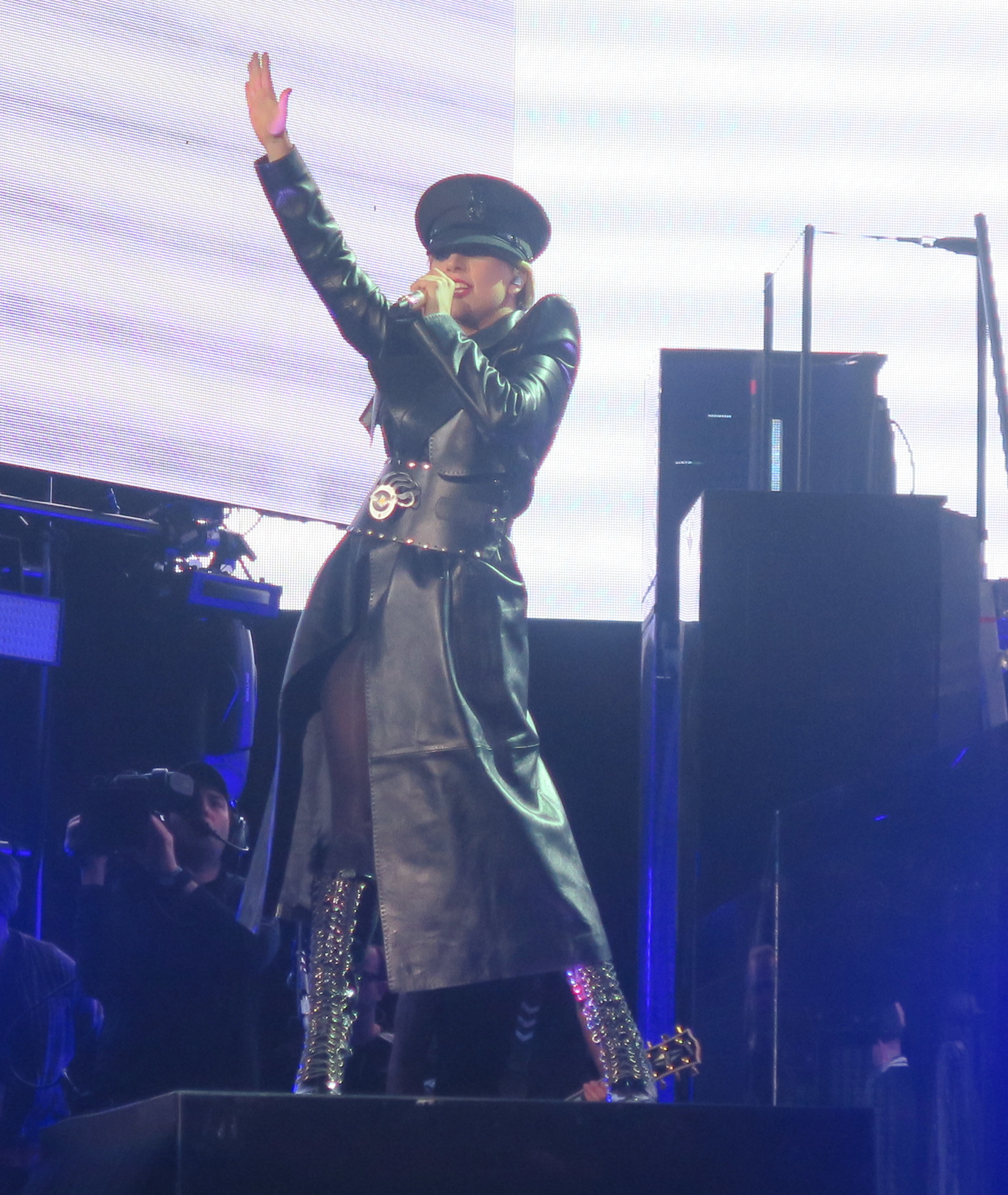
Gaga opening her 2017 Coachella set with "Scheiße"

Lady Gaga included the song's first verse in her performance at the Germany's Next Topmodel TV show on June 6, 2011. She emerged from a well-lit doorway wearing a turquoise wig, a black hat, and a long black dress and walked towards a piano. Only the German lines and the first line of the song were performed, after which Gaga moved to a piano decorated with dollar bills and sang an acoustic version of "Born This Way". Ray Rodriguez of ImpreMedia, in a review of the performance, stated that "Gaga took over the stage. Gaga always provides material to talk about. And their presentation was no exception and this time she was seen dancing across a row of cutters labeled with the words 'money', 'sex' and 'vanity' while scantily clad dancers threw her around the stage notes" and Charlie Amter of The Hollywood Reporter stated that "Gaga dazzled German fans". The opening faux-German lines, first verse and chorus opened Gaga's set at the iHeart Radio music festival in Las Vegas. "Scheiße" was performed on the Born This Way Ball tour (2012–2013) as the last song before the encore. Gaga, with long blonde pigtails, performed a complex dance routine wearing a black top and pants, described by Miguel Dumaual of CBS News as containing "solid dance-beats". On some occasions, Gaga invited audience members on stage to dance along with her to "Scheiße".

In 2017, Gaga performed "Scheiße" as the opening track of her Coachella set. She wore a Mugler leather coat with pointy shoulder pads, along with an admiral cap, a big leather belt, and grommet covered boots. Vanessa Franko from The Press-Enterprise opined that she "dressed like a military-inspired dominatrix" for the performance. Peter Larsen from the same newspaper thought that "Scheiße" was an understandable choice as the opening song, "its musical elements fitting neatly with the electronic dance music that dominates a huge part of the festival these days." The track was also part of the setlist of the Joanne World Tour (2017–2018). Gaga was wearing a fringe-covered black leather jacket for the performance, which was custom-made for her by Alexander Wang, along with fishnets and black thigh-high boots. "Scheiße" was performed on the singer's 2018–2020 Las Vegas residency show, Enigma. For the duration of the song, Gaga was seen sitting on top of a metallic, clawed, robot-like equipment, which journalists compared to a Transformer, and to a giant spider. In 2025, Gaga once again included "Scheiße" in her 2025 promotional concerts for Mayhem, including a headlining set at Coachella, for a performance which "involved a bunch of oversize quill pens and a Last Supper-style tableau." The song was later incorporated into The Mayhem Ball (2025–2026) tour, retaining the same aesthetic and staging.

== Credits and personnel ==
Credits adapted from the liner notes of Born This Way.

- Lady Gaga – vocals, songwriter, producer
- RedOne – producer, songwriter, vocal editor, vocal arrangement, engineer, instrumentation, programmer, recording engineer
- Trevor Muzzy – recording engineer, vocal editor, engineer, mixer
- Gene Grimaldi – mastering engineer

== Charts ==
Weekly chart performance for "Scheiße"
Chart (2011)	Peak position
Canada Digital Songs (Billboard)	72
Germany Download (Media Control)	90
South Korea Foreign (Circle)	9
UK Singles (Official Charts Company)	136
US Bubbling Under Hot 100 (Billboard)	11
US Dance/Electronic Digital Songs (Billboard)	6
