= The Edge of Glory =

2011 single by Lady Gaga

Single by Lady Gaga

from the album Born This Way
- Released: May 9, 2011
- Recorded: 2010
- Studio: The Living Room (Oslo, Norway)
- Genre: Pop; electro-rock; arena rock; disco
- Length: 5:20 (album version): 4:20 (radio edit)
- Label: Streamline; KonLive; Interscope
- Songwriters: Lady Gaga; Fernando Garibay; Paul Blair aka DJ White Shadow
- Producers: Lady Gaga; Fernando Garibay

Lady Gaga singles chronology
"Judas" (2011)	"The Edge of Glory" (2011)	"3-Way (The Golden Rule)" (2011)

Music video
- "The Edge of Glory" on YouTube

"The Edge of Glory" is a song by American singer Lady Gaga from her second studio album, Born This Way (2011). The song was released on May 9, 2011, as the album's third single. Initially released as one of two promotional singles for Born This Way, it shortly became a single following its success in digital outlets worldwide. The song was written and produced by Gaga and Fernando Garibay, and is a pop, electro-rock, and disco song that speaks of the last moments of life. According to Gaga, lyrical inspiration came from the death of her grandfather, who died in September 2010. Along with a saxophone solo played by Clarence Clemons, the melody of the song resembles much of the musical works of Bruce Springsteen, and contains several qualities similar to that of 1980s adult contemporary musical works.

"The Edge of Glory" received critical acclaim, with many reviewers deeming it an album highlight. Much of the praise went to the song's chorus and the musical production. Reviewers also complimented Gaga's vocals, describing it as "soulful". The song was a commercial success worldwide and even more successful than "Judas", charting in the top 10 in several major music markets, including Australia, Belgium, Canada, France, New Zealand, Norway, Spain and the United Kingdom. In the United States, it peaked at number three on the Billboard Hot 100, becoming Gaga's tenth consecutive top-10 single in the United States.

A music video for the song was filmed in late May, co-directed by the singer and her production team, Haus of Gaga. The video is simple in contrast to much of Gaga's past work and portrays her dancing on a fire-escape and walking on a lonely street. Differences include the lack of intricate choreography and backup dancers, as well as using only one outfit designed by Versace. Critics praised the simplicity of the video, while comparing it to the works of Michael Jackson, Janet Jackson and Madonna. Live performances of the song include the tenth season of American Idol, the 2011 MuchMusic Video Awards, Good Morning America's "Summer Concert Series", and many of Gaga's concert tours.

== Background and release ==
"The Edge of Glory" was written by Lady Gaga, Fernando Garibay, and DJ White Shadow, and was produced by Gaga and Garibay. The origins of the song first came about in January 2011, when Gaga released part of the lyrics on her Twitter account. DJ White Shadow revealed that before they returned to Europe for the 2010 dates of The Monster Ball Tour, Gaga had taken leave for few days to be with her ailing grandfather. After he died, Gaga told White Shadow that she wrote a song about her grandfather's death and its impact on her. Gaga spoke to Jon Pareles of The New York Times about the story behind the song:

"['The Edge of Glory'] was about how when my grandma was standing over my grandfather while he was dying. There was this moment where I felt like he had sort of looked at her and reckoned that he had won in life. Like, 'I'm a champion. We won. Our love made us a winner.' They were married 60 years. I thought about that idea, that the glorious moment of your life is when you decide that it's okay to go, you don't have any more words to say, more business, more mountains to climb. You're on the cliff, you tip your hat to yourself and you go. That's what it was for me in that moment when I witnessed it."

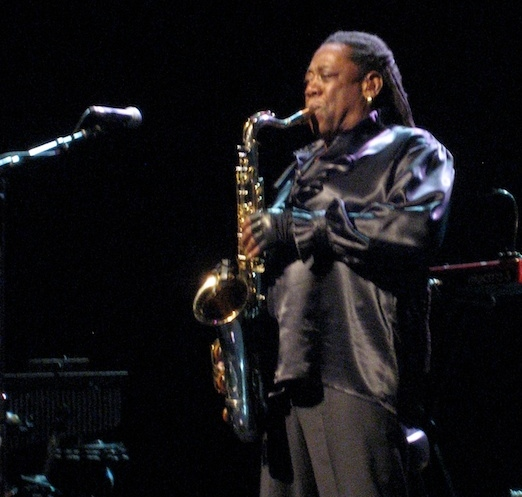
Clarence Clemons from E Street Band played saxophone on "The Edge of Glory".

More information in regards to "The Edge of Glory" was revealed by Gaga, in an interview with Google where she explained the song as being about one's final moments on Earth, before death. Another inspiration for the song was actor Sylvester Stallone's 1976 film Rocky, which is Gaga's favorite film. The singer felt that the song was about looking at life directly, with the feeling that he or she is a champion—like the emotion displayed by the character Rocky Balboa in the film.

On May 5, 2011, Interscope sent out an e-mail to radio stations across the United States, which explained that "The Edge of Glory" was to be released on Monday, May 9, 2011, as the first of two promotional singles for Born This Way. It was to serve as the first song in the "Countdown to Born This Way" promotion on iTunes Store. However, after its release to the digital stores, "The Edge of Glory" started selling a considerable amount of digital downloads, prompting Gaga to make it the third single from Born This Way. On her Twitter account Gaga revealed the cover for the single. It shows a naked Gaga with her mouth open, wearing her facial prosthetics from the "Born This Way" cover, and her hair wildly cascading around her.

== Recording and composition ==
"The Edge of Glory" features synthesizers executed in a style influenced by smooth jazz, as well as the inclusion of a saxophone solo. The song is less electronic and more straightforward pop, and the lyrics deal more with romance than individual inspiration. Garibay revealed that the song was recorded in Gaga's natural vocal tone, and required just one take. She requested him to add the sound of heartbeat at the start of the track. Garibay said that the decision to add a saxophone solo was a "bold move" for Gaga, since contemporary hit radio did not have any songs with a saxophone solo on their song playlists.

'The Edge of Glory'
A 32-second sample of "The Edge of Glory" featuring the end of the chorus and the beginning of the bridge which contains the saxophone solo. Kevin O'Donnell of Spin magazine compared the composition of the song with Pat Benatar's songs, Bonnie Tyler's "Total Eclipse of the Heart" (1983) and Laurie Anderson's "O Superman" (1981).

A pop, electro-rock, arena rock, and disco song, "The Edge of Glory" opens with Gaga's vocals over a keyboard, singing the line: "There ain't no reason you and me should be alone tonight, yeah baby, tonight, yeah baby." According to MTV's Jocelyn Vena, the song's production evokes the "late '80s, early '90s adult-contemporary pop, when big choruses were the norm for songs." Jason Lipshultz from Billboard stated the song "leans upon sunny electronica" that sounds big on the chorus, where Gaga sings "I'm on the edge of glory and I'm hanging on a moment of truth". Evan Sawdey of the website PopMatters found several rock elements in the composition of the song. Vena also felt that what made the song stand out from others on the radio was the saxophone solo by Clemons right in the middle of the track, as Gaga belts out, "I'm on the edge with you." Robert Copsey from Digital Spy said that the musical composition is a mixture of loud-sounding electric guitars and club-beat influenced synths. The song and album ends with a long coda, with the sound of the saxophone fading out.

According to sheet music published at Musicnotes.com by Sony/ATV Music Publishing, "The Edge of Glory" is written in common time with a tempo of 128 beats per minute. Set in the key of A major, it follows the basic chord progression of A–E–D for the verse and A–E–F♯m–D progression for the chorus, while Gaga's voice spans from A_{3} to D_{5}. Gaga's reference for the saxophone solo was the E Street Band and Bruce Springsteen; she ultimately asked Clarence Clemons from the E Street Band to play the instrument. Clemons told Rolling Stone that in January 2011 he was contacted by Gaga's management and they wanted him to play on Born This Way. Since the call was on a Friday, Clemons replied that he could record it on the coming Monday or Tuesday, but Gaga was adamant to have him at the New York recording studio on that day itself. Clemons flew from Florida to New York, and reached the recording studio in Manhattan at midnight. Gaga wanted him to play saxophone on multiple tracks, one of them being "The Edge of Glory". She simply told Clemons, "We'll put the tape on and you just play". The recording concluded by 3 a.m. after a few takes. Clemons added that he was surprised to get paid, since he "would have done it for free. I can never believe something that feels so good earns me money."

== Critical reception ==
"The Edge of Glory" was met with general acclaim from critics. While previewing the song Matthew Perpetua from Rolling Stone wrote a positive review: "This one sounds crazy in print [...], but somehow it all seems totally natural when you actually hear it." Perpetua added that there is an element of cheesiness in the song, but nevertheless, it is captivating and catchy when one listens to it. He complimented the inclusion of Clemons as an "inspired touch that amplifies the song's Eighties stadium rock vibe," and Clemons' actual performance was described as amazing and among the best of his career. In another review, Perpetua noted that "The Edge of Glory" is "an immediate pop anthem". Fellow Rolling Stone journalist Jody Rosen complimented the hook, the chorus and Clemens' saxophone playing on the song. Jocelyn Vena from MTV News asserted that the song showed a softer side to Gaga, as opposed to her previous singles from Born This Way. Willa Paskin from New York was impressed with the track, saying: "If the first two tracks off the forthcoming Born This Way were all jangly dance-rock, this is as smooth as an '80s jam straight off the Flashdance soundtrack, and it has the saxophone breakdown to prove it." Paskin also believed that the song had potential to be a summer hit, but could face competition from singer Katy Perry's single, "Last Friday Night (T.G.I.F.)".

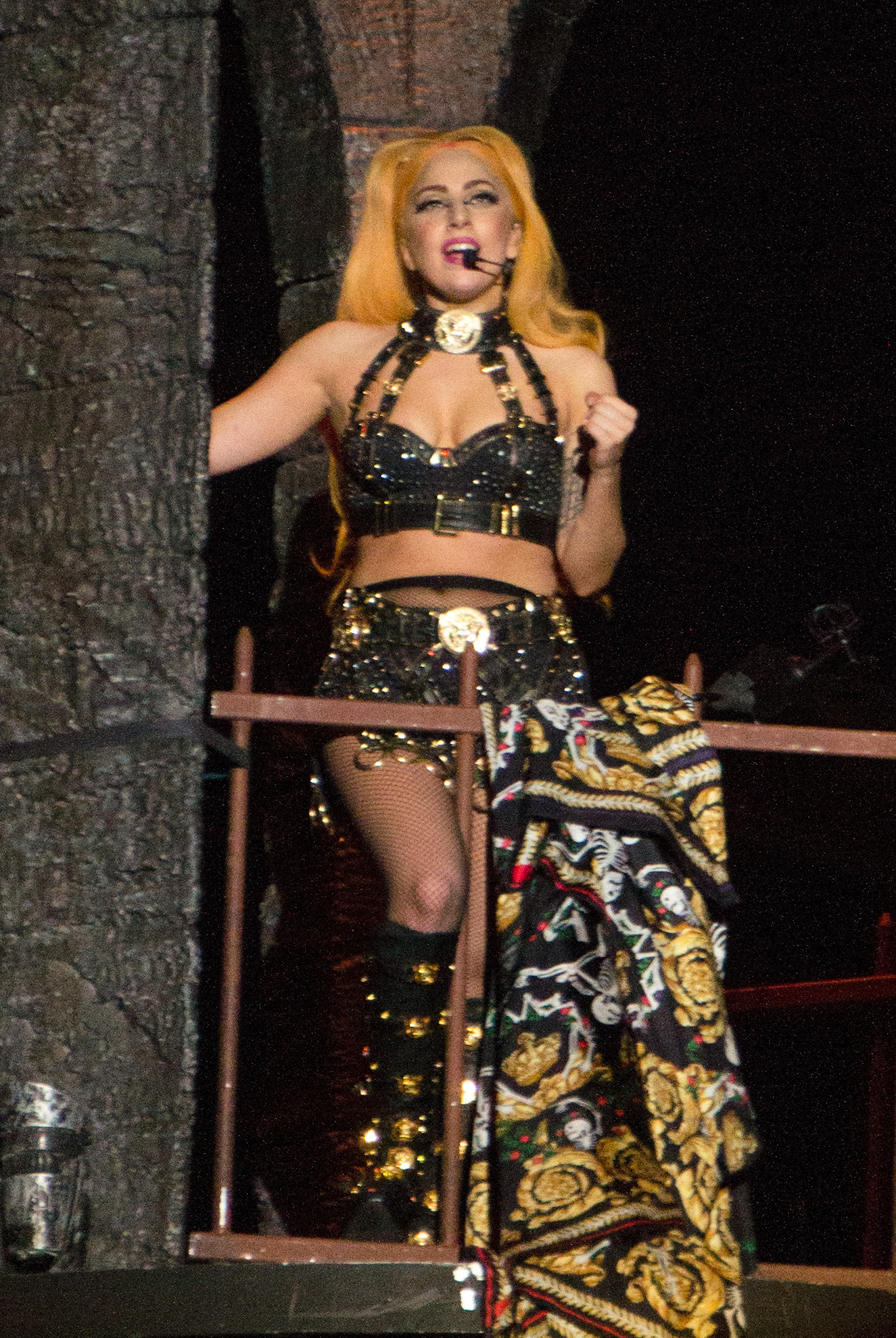
Gaga performing "The Edge of Glory" during the Born This Way Ball tour in 2012

Jason Lipshutz of Billboard wrote that "The Edge of Glory" was "risk-taking, [but] it's focused on romance rather than individual inspiration." Lewis Corner of Digital Spy awarded the song with five out of five stars and wrote: "Gaga belts over a chorus tastier and more filling than a meatball sub – stuffed with stadium-sized beats and massive techno synths; while the side of sax solo courtesy of the late Clarence Clemons is bound to seduce many a clubber into bringing out their rarely-used-nowadays air sax." Kevin O'Donnell of Spin noted that in the song, Gaga "goes back to basics". He also called the song a "four-on-the-floor anthem with loads of references to '80s pop music" and concluded "Thankfully, 'Edge of Glory' proves Gaga hasn't let her global celebrity get the best of her art, and she's still capable to cranking out straightforward, dance-ready jams like 'Just Dance' or 'Poker Face'." Both Andy Gill of The Independent and James Reed of The Boston Globe praised Clarence Clemons' saxophone solo in "The Edge of Glory".

Nardine Saad from Los Angeles Times asserted that "The Edge of Glory" was less shock-provoking than her previous releases. Saad also felt that the track was slower and less electro in its composition than "Judas", her then current single. Priya Elan of NME wrote that the song felt like a "pop moment" without Gaga trying too hard to address social issues or religious conflicts; Elan also complimented Clemons' saxophone addition. Similar sentiments were expressed by fellow NME writer Dan Martin, who found the track to be gleaming, calling it the "most ecstatic pop serenade" Gaga has ever come up with. Robert Copsey from Digital Spy commented that the song is a "straight-up fists-in-the-air feel-good anthem that is less cheesy than 'Born This Way' but equally (if not more) euphoric." However, he found the opening bar of the song similar to that of Cher's 2002 single "Song for the Lonely".

Megan Gibson from Time was disappointed with the single, feeling that it was not "particularly good", and called the music as trite, uninspiring and bland. Matthew Cole from Slant Magazine was polarized with the song, stating that while it lowered his expectations for the album, he expressed that the saxophone solo was "admittedly a high point, and one of the more original ideas that Gaga has had of late." Sal Cinquemani, from the same publication, felt that the song "isn't retro so much as retrograde, starting off with some crafty Art of Noise synth tones before morphing into what sounds like the theme song to an early-'90s sitcom, or an inspirational sports flick, as sung by Bonnie Tyler." Greg Kot of Chicago Tribune also gave a mixed review about the song, calling it a "Springsteen-on-steroids bombast" and adding that it features "Clarence Clemons doing almost a parody of a Clarence Clemons sax solo."

"The Edge of Glory" is widely regarded as one of Lady Gaga's finest songs. In 2019, Billboard ranked the song number nine on their list of the 15 greatest Lady Gaga songs, and in 2020, The Guardian ranked the song number two on their list of the 30 greatest Lady Gaga songs.

== Accolades ==
"The Edge of Glory" was nominated in the category for Song of the Year at the 38th People's Choice Awards. At the end of 2011, Slant Magazine listed "The Edge of Glory" as the eighth best song of the year, with Ed Gonzalez from the website commenting that the song is "a study in radical contrast that, once you sift aside its deliberately dated effects and the legacy of the late Clarence Clemons, is deep down an incredibly delicate ballad. Yes, everyone expects Gaga to make her confessions on the dance floor, but who knew she could make her shouts whisper?" It was placed at the same rank by Billboard, and at position seven by Rolling Stone. In September 2013, the saxophone solo ranked number two on VH1's list of the 15 Greatest Guest Solos in Rock History.

== Chart performance ==
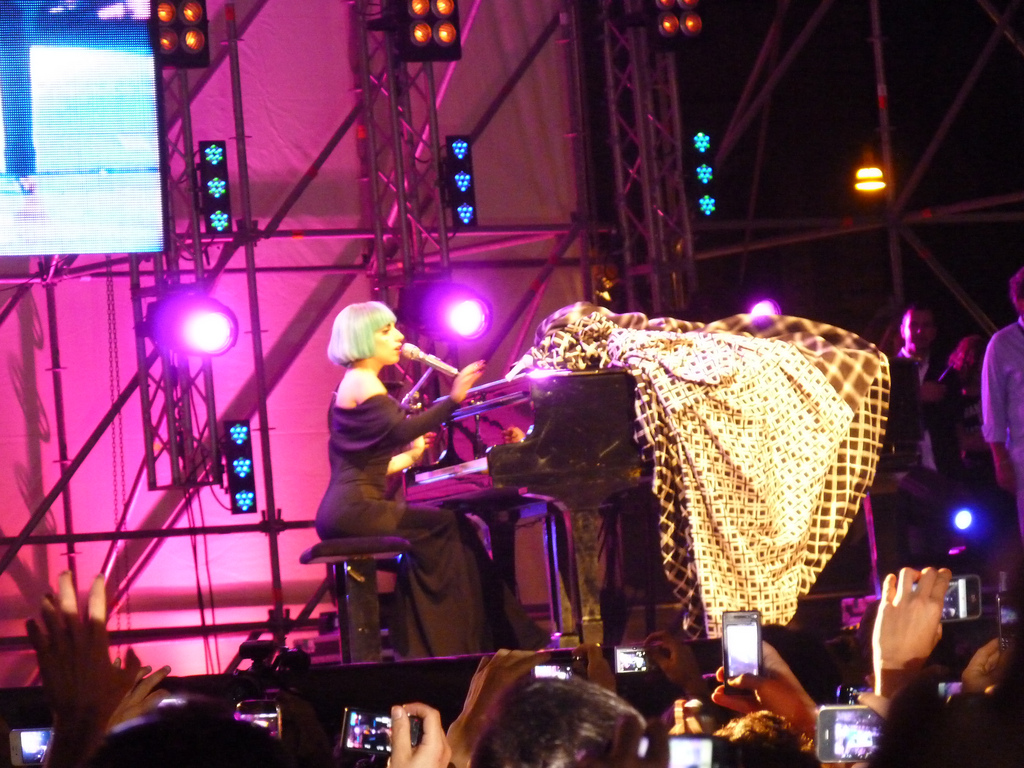
Gaga performing an acoustic version of "The Edge of Glory" on Europride 2011

In the United States, "The Edge of Glory" debuted at number 31 on the Billboard Pop Songs chart, for the issue dated May 28, 2011. It also debuted at number two on the Hot Digital Songs chart, with sales of 266,000 copies, according to Nielsen SoundScan. The song entered the Billboard Hot 100 at number three, and the Radio Songs chart at number 54, with 20 million audience impressions. Gaga became the first artist since Mariah Carey to have her first ten singles enter the top ten of the Hot 100. The next week, "The Edge of Glory" moved up to number 18 on Pop Songs, becoming the greatest gainer of the week. However, digital sales dropped by 64% to 98,000 copies, hence the song fell to number 19 on the Hot 100. The song rose to number 37 on the Radio Songs chart, with airplay increasing to 30 million audience impressions. In its third week on the chart, "The Edge of Glory" was again the greatest gaining song on the Pop Songs chart and reached number 14, while debuting at number 33 on the Adult Pop Songs chart. It was also the greatest-earning digital song, selling 165,000 copies, with overall airplay increasing to 39 million audience impressions, subsequently resulting in the song re-entering the top-ten of the Hot 100 at number eight. In the end, the song reached a peak of number four on Radio Songs, number three on Pop Songs, number one on Hot Dance Club Songs, number seven on Adult Contemporary and number two on Adult Pop Songs. "The Edge of Glory" sold 2.325 million digital copies in 2011 and became the 29th best-selling song of the year in the United States. As of April 2016, it has sold 3,000,000 digital downloads in the US according to Nielsen SoundScan.

"The Edge of Glory" debuted at number three on the Canadian Hot 100 and entered on the Canadian Hot Digital Songs chart at number two, selling 26,000 digital downloads. It was the top debuting song on the contemporary hit radio chart of Canada, at number 42. After four weeks, the song re-entered the top 10 of the Canadian Hot 100, and reached the top 10 of the Contemporary hit radio chart. In the United Kingdom, "The Edge of Glory" debuted at number six on the UK Singles Chart. After fluctuating down the charts for few weeks, the song rebounded in the top 10 on June 26, 2011. Its digital sales increased by 89.1%, supported by the performance of the song on Paul O'Grady Live, which was broadcast on three occasions, and promoted in the radio airplay of the song, where it moved up the chart to reach a peak of eleven. By January 2025, the song had sold 1.1 million copies in the UK with 54 million streams. In October 2026, the song was certified double platinum by the British Phonographic Industry (BPI) for sales of 1.2 million equivalent units.

In Australia, it debuted at number 11 on the ARIA Singles Chart and in New Zealand it debuted at number three on the RIANZ Singles Chart. The song was later certified quintuple platinum and Gold by the Australian Recording Industry Association (ARIA) and the Recording Industry Association of New Zealand (RIANZ), for shipment of 350,000 and 7,500 copies of the single, respectively. In Ireland, "The Edge of Glory" debuted at number 10 on the Irish Singles Chart, on May 13, 2011, and reached a peak of four. In France, the song debuted at number seven on the French Singles Chart, before dropping to number 35, becoming Gaga's tenth top ten but also her biggest dropping in the country. In Germany, the song debuted on the Media Control Charts at number 28, and reached a peak of three. "The Edge of Glory" sold 44,176 digital downloads in South Korea, to debut at number two on the Gaon International Online Chart on May 22, 2011, and moved to the top of the chart the next week, with further sales of 48,937 copies.

== Music video ==
=== Background ===
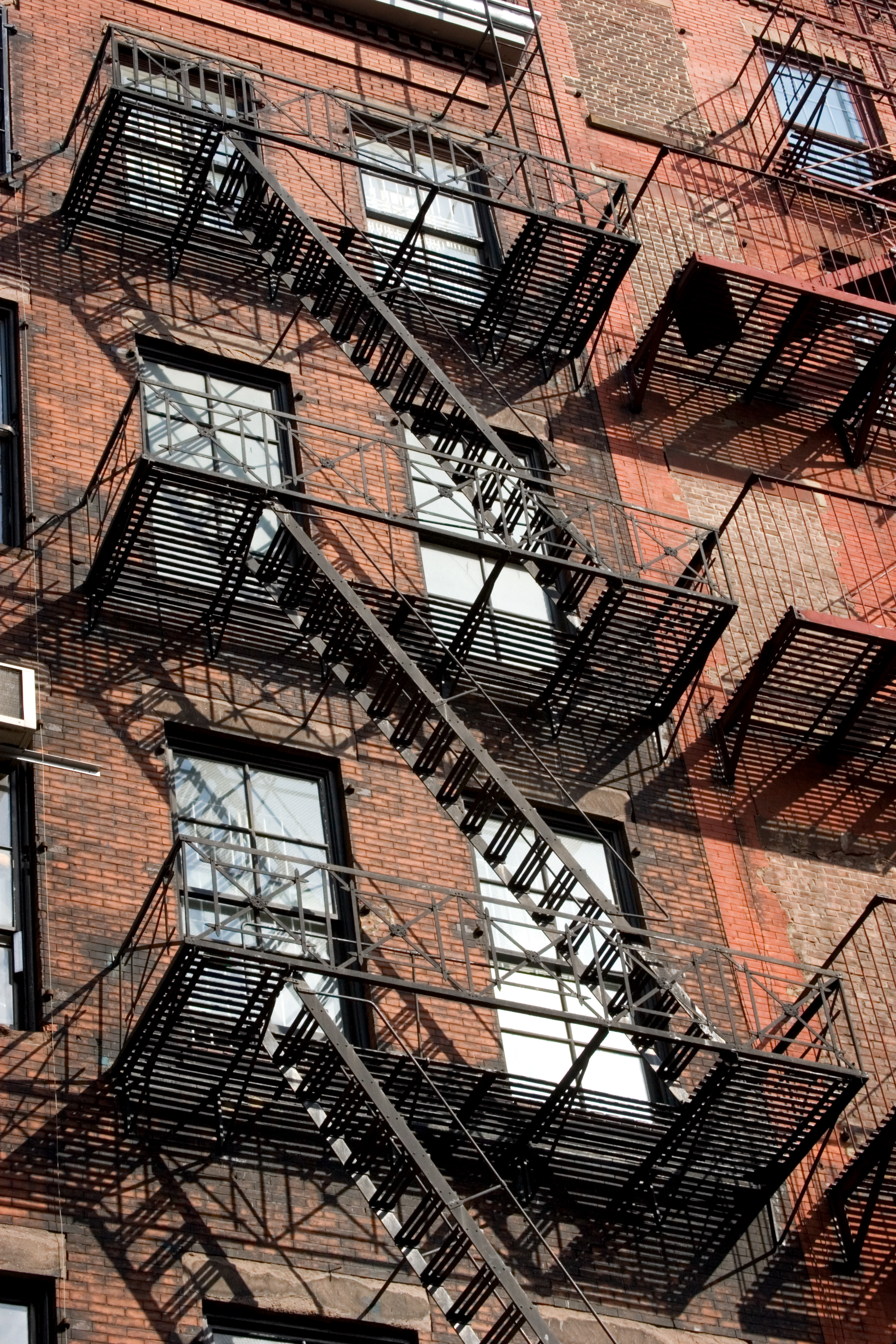
The video featured Gaga dancing outside a fire escape, reminiscent of her early days in New York City.

At the BMI Pop Music Awards, Gaga's choreographer Laurieann Gibson explained that they would be filming the music video for "The Edge of Glory" soon. While she did not reveal much about the music video concept, she added: "I just know that we'll be feeling very fishy." Gaga told MTV UK that she had recently written the treatment for the video, adding that it's her favorite. E! Online reported that a casting call for the video was made, where the agents looked for a Puerto Rican or Dominican origin male. Other roles included a male or female on-air reporter, a doctor role reminiscent to the one in the popular show Dr. 90210, and a group of military men for scenes involving rifles. The music video director was confirmed as Joseph Kahn, but Interscope Records later confirmed that Kahn and Gaga parted ways due to collaborative misunderstandings. Gibson confirmed that there was "some issues on the set", which resulted in Kahn being replaced as the director.

Gaga's creative team Haus of Gaga were later chosen to direct the video instead. Chancler Haynes, Kahn's on-set editor revealed that the mermaid-themed performance of the song, on Le Grand Journal was the actual theme of the video, and included sets built for a hospital scene, Brooklyn Bridge, and a big underwater mermaid scene. However, at the last minute until shooting, Gaga changed her mind regarding the whole concept, leading to a disagreement with Kahn, and hence it was cancelled. She then shot the scenes with Clarence Clemons (his final appearance before he died) in a New York City set. She later explained that her idea was to create a "sweater set of a video". She wanted to acknowledge herself and the success she had experienced in her music career, with a simplified video showing her dancing outside her New York apartment from her early days. The music video premiered on June 16, 2011, on the eighth season of US reality television show, So You Think You Can Dance.

=== Synopsis ===
Gaga's wardrobe throughout the entire video primarily consists of only one outfit which was designed by Gianni Versace. The dress consists of a S&M-inspired outfit, with heavy gold jewelry, studs on the leather, and vibrant nail polish and lipstick. Notable in the video is the absence of backup dancers, elaborate choreography, or a symbolic plot: components that have been fully predominant in Gaga's other music videos. Aside from Gaga herself, Clemons is the only other person to appear in the video.

The video begins with Gaga slowly appearing from behind a building on a deserted street corner. The whole scenario is pervaded in red and purple lights, coming from the windows of the buildings and alleyways as steam billows out from the drains. When the first verse of the song begins, Gaga emerges from the window of an apartment onto the fire escape. A long take follows, of Gaga strutting through the red-lit district singing the line "I got a reason that you should take me home tonight", and a shock of black hair falls in her eyes. Gaga does not remove it and the shot spans to her walking backside, gesturing the viewer to follow. The video consists mostly of intersplicing shots of Gaga dancing and singing on the street, on the fire escape, and on the steps in front of the apartment building with Clemons. Near the end of the video, after Clemons' saxophone solo, Gaga hunches over in front of the building's steps and kisses the sidewalk. The video concludes with a close-up of Gaga's face, before she comes back through the window into her hazy apartment.

=== Reception ===
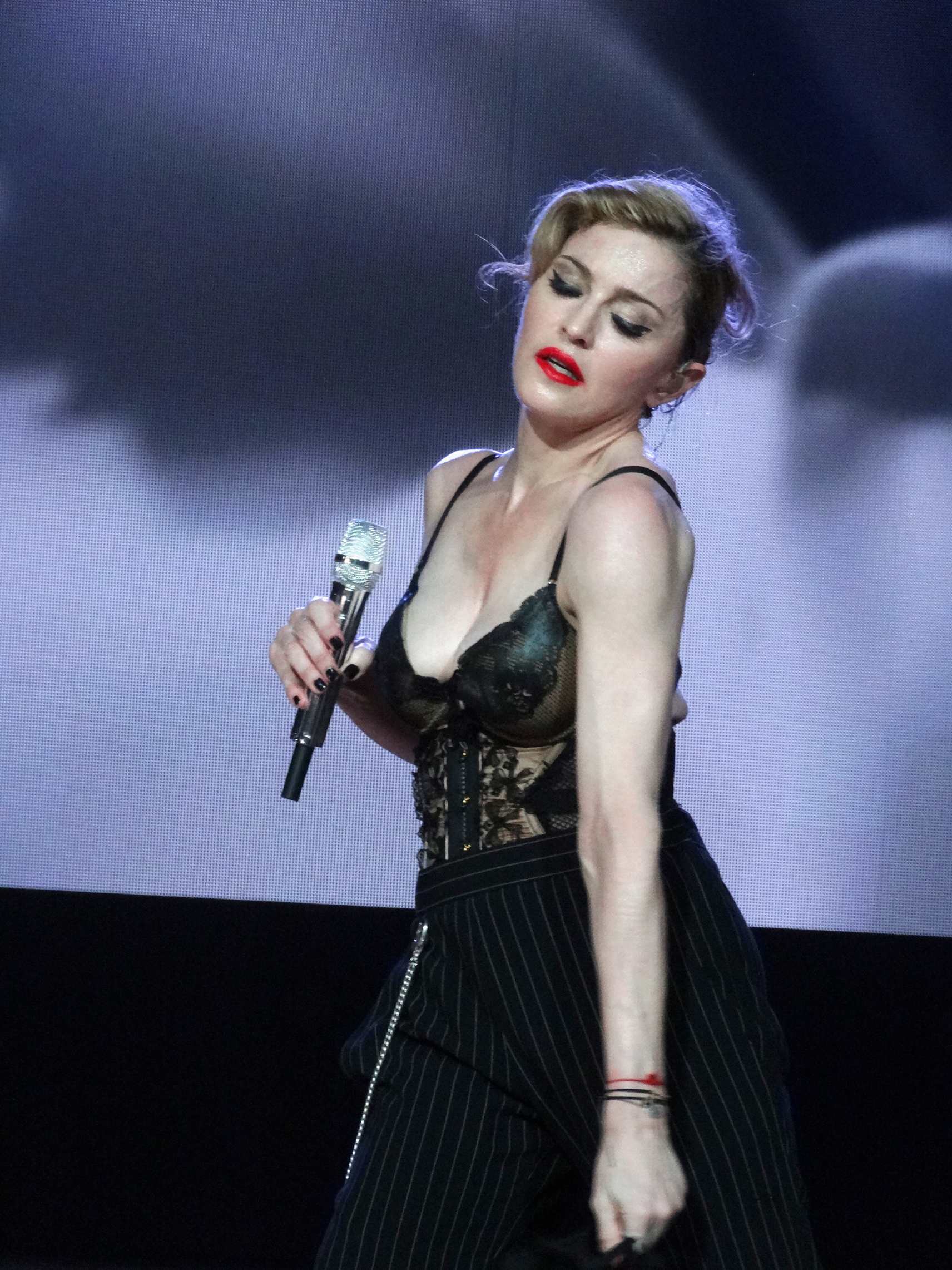
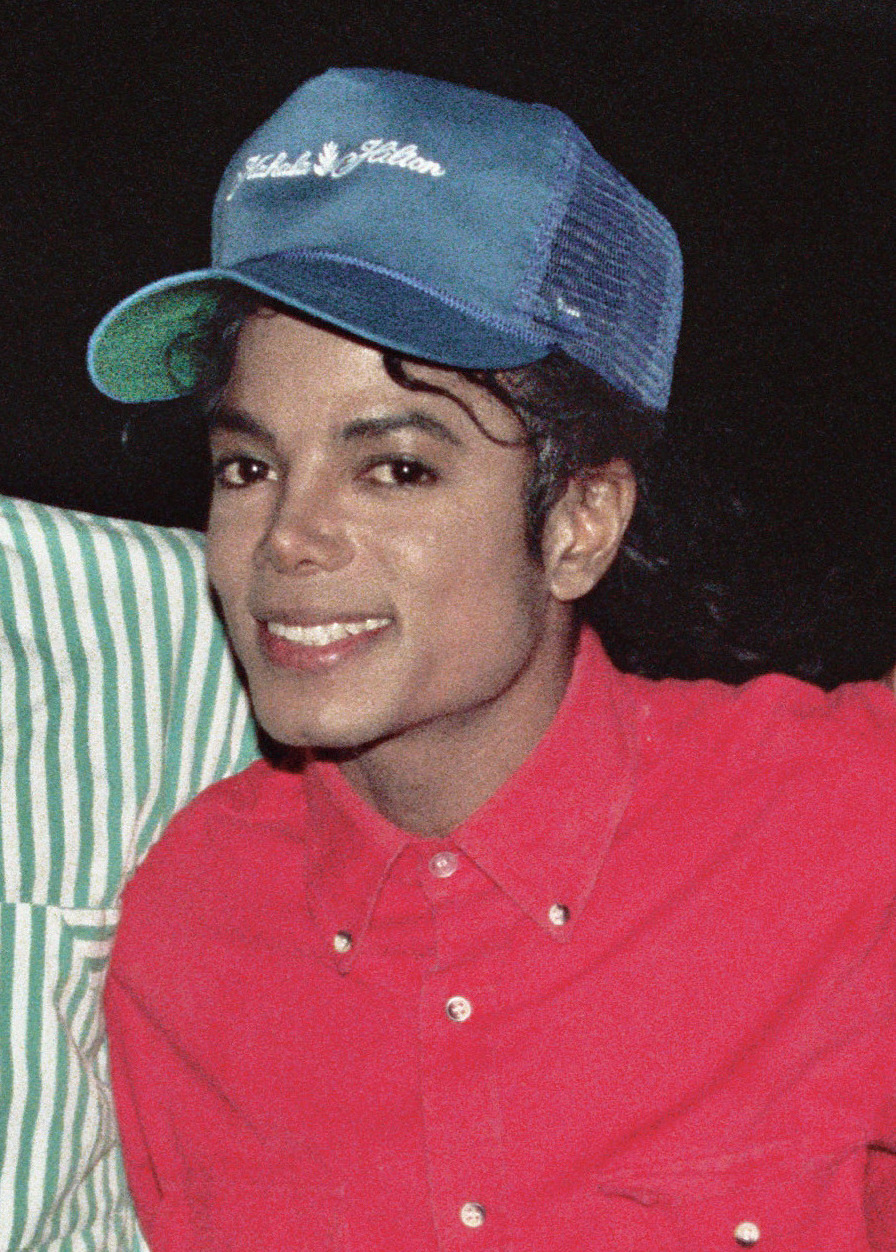
Several critics opined that some scenes in the music video were reminiscent of Madonna's music video for "Papa Don't Preach", and Michael Jackson's music video for "Billie Jean".

Both Jocelyn Vena from MTV and Christian Blauvelt from Entertainment Weekly commented on the similarity of the music video with the Broadway musical, Rent. Vena also compared the visuals with those for Madonna's 1986 single "Papa Don't Preach" and Michael Jackson's 1983 single, "Billie Jean". She concluded by saying that the music video "still manages to shine, mostly because of its simplicity". In another review, James Montgomery from MTV, also found similarities between the video and the musicals Rent and West Side Story. Blauvelt was initially surprised to see the simplistic approach of the video, since her past releases had provocative visuals. He added that the video seemed a "clear homage" to Gaga's inspirations like Madonna, concluding that "all the references in 'The Edge of Glory' are so overt, there's no way it could be shameless cribbing."

Sal Cinquemani of Slant Magazine gave the video a positive review, calling it a "visual triumph", with "breathtaking" art direction, and a "gray-blue-black color palette carefully calibrated by Gaga's vibrant lipstick and nail polish, a red painted stripe on the curb, and the gold of her jewelry and the studs on her leather, not to mention Clarence Clemons's brass." The video was compared to Michael Jackson's "The Way You Make Me Feel", Janet Jackson's "When I Think of You" and "The Pleasure Principle", and the film, Crimes of Passion, all of them being 1980s videos and films. He did, however, criticize Gaga's "half-convincing" lip-synching. Writing for The Washington Post, Sarah Anne Hughes called the video "shockingly simple". Amos Barshad from New York liked the straight approach Gaga took with the video, and although he called it boring compared to Gaga's previous efforts, he felt the video worked well because of the simplicity.

Jarett Wieselman from New York Post tried to understand what actually went wrong with the production, and came to the conclusion that the mutual disagreements between Gaga and Kahn led to the video being a "piece of rubbish". He deemed the whole issue surrounding the production as "foolish", in the end agreeing that "it was foolish of us to expect that GaGa would never stumble because, despite the preternatural image constantly presented, she is only human after all." Rolling Stone's Daniel Kreps gave a mixed review of the video, calling the song "over-the-top" with a "lackluster" and "understated" video. Dose's Leah Collins was more neutral in her review, questioning if Gaga was simply "swooning with nostalgia for other pop culture nuggets that have featured the same NYC backdrop of fire escapes and brown-stone steps" or just attempting to "be saving a metric buttload on the budget". She further compared Gaga's look in the video to a "hooker" from the 1982 science fiction film, Blade Runner.

== Live performances ==
Gaga first performed an acoustic-jazz version of the song in the United Kingdom, at Radio 1's Big Weekend in Carlisle, England, on May 15, 2011. Another piano version of the song was performed a week later on the season finale of Saturday Night Live, where the singer wore a metallic black dress, knee-high boots and a semi-circular metallic headdress. The full version was first performed at the final show of American Idol season 10 on May 25, where she was joined by Clemons in person. Gaga appeared perched atop a mountain top on the stage, dressed in a long cape and a bedazzled headpiece. A trio of dancers were at the base of the set performing choreographed dance steps while Gaga sang from the top. At the end of the performance, Gaga and a dancer embraced each other, took a breath and then jumped off the edge of the stage, landing out of sight on a bed of fake rocks, as steam shot up high in the air. Len Melisurgo from The Star-Ledger felt that the performance was too "sexually suggestive" for the audience of American Idol and wondered whether Gaga "went just a little too far for a family-oriented show that's geared toward a younger audience?" Conversely, Adam Graham from MTV News listed it as one of Gaga's most memorable television performances.

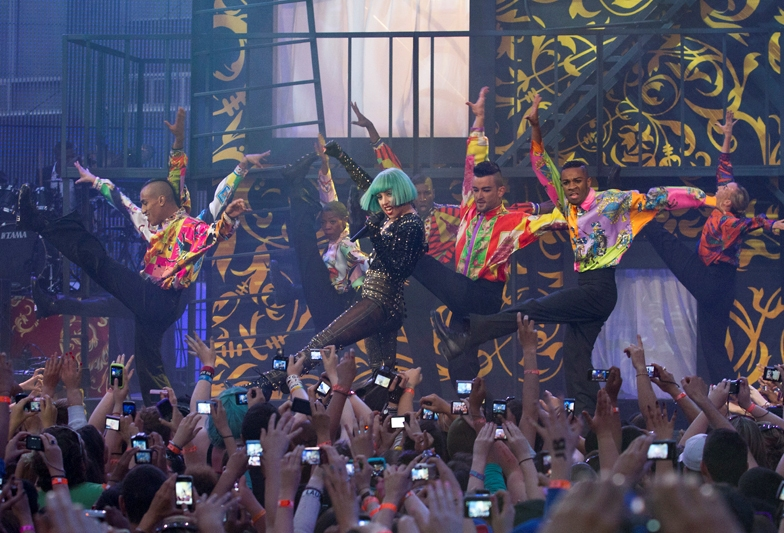
Gaga performing "The Edge of Glory" at the 2011 MuchMusic Video Awards

On May 27, 2011, Gaga performed "The Edge of Glory" on Good Morning America as a part of their "Summer Concert Series", wearing a full black dress. At the sixth cycle of Germany's Next Topmodel, Gaga performed the song on the final show. The performance included a segment where Gaga was portrayed as getting beheaded in a guillotine. Gaga then jumped up with a prosthetic head held aloft, before snarling towards the judges "I would kill for fashion". The whole show was broadcast worldwide on the internet. An acoustic version was later performed at the Europride 2011 in Rome, along with "Born This Way". At the X Factor show in Paris, Gaga performed it along with "Judas". She wore a fringed dress with long hair extensions and a long blue wig, while playing a keytar. At the French television show, Le Grand Journal, a mermaid themed performance of "The Edge of Glory" was televised. Gaga re-created the New York City fire escape sets for the performance of the song on the Paul O'Grady Live show. Ryan Love of Digital Spy had an advance preview of the recording of the show, and complimented the choreography by Gaga and her dancer, during the saxophone interlude. Gaga opened the 2011 MuchMusic Video Awards with a performance of the song, sporting a bejeweled catsuit and a bob teal colored wig. While on tour in Japan, Gaga performed "The Edge of Glory" and "Born This Way" at the 2011 MTV Video Music Aid Japan. On October 16, 2011, she performed the song during a concert at the Hollywood Bowl in Los Angeles for the Clinton Foundation. "The Edge of Glory" was performed regularly as the penultimate song of Gaga's Born This Way Ball (2012–2013) tour where she played the beginning of the song on piano atop a watch tower. She wore a Versace-designed outfit for the performance. In 2014, Gaga sang a short a cappella version of the song during the ArtRave: The Artpop Ball.

In October 2016, Gaga appeared in the Carpool Karaoke segment of The Late Late Show with James Corden, where "The Edge of Glory" was one of the songs Gaga sang in the vehicle. At her 2017 Coachella Festival set and during the Joanne World Tour (2017–2018), Gaga performed the track in a piano-only rendition. On the tour, the singer usually dedicated the song to family members and her late friend, Sonja, who died of cancer. The performance was singled out by many journalists as an emotional highlight and one of the best moments of the tour. In October 2017, Gaga appeared at the Deep From the Heart: The One America Appeal benefit concert in Texas, joining other performers in raising money to hurricane victims. She played "The Edge of Glory" as the last song of her piano set, after performing "Million Reasons" and "You and I". The song was part of the setlist of the singer's 2018–2020 Las Vegas residency show, Enigma, where she performed it wearing a transparent dress, with a cut-out bodysuit underneath. In 2022, the singer performed the song at The Chromatica Ball stadium tour, while playing on a piano set inside a sculpture of thorns.

In November 2024, Gaga sang "The Edge of Glory" at Benjamin Franklin Parkway, the night before the 2024 United States presidential election, for Kamala Harris's final rally. In 2025, she performed it on the piano at select dates of The Mayhem Ball tour.

== Cover versions ==
Pop-rock singer Nick Jonas sang an acoustic version of the song in July during his concert at the Westfield Century City in Los Angeles. Before the performance Jonas announced: "Do you guys mind if I play a couple of songs I like from pop radio right now? Would that be OK? The only problem is, I don't know all the words. So if you know them, sing along." After watching the performance online, Gaga posted his cover on her Twitter account along with the words "Swoon! Nick Jonas singing The Edge of Glory. On my way to press conference in Taichung, listening to it. So dreamy! X." British band Friendly Fires covered the song during BBC Radio 1's Live Lounge. Kevin O'Donnell of Spin praised their cover writing: "Gaga's original showcases the pop star's gale force pipes, and Friendly Fires frontman Ed Macfarlane doesn't try to match that energy. Instead, they offer a lovely, cinematic take on the song: Macfarlane croons with the heart-on-sleeve sensitivity of an emo-boy over cascading synth melodies and a breezy funk pulse. Nice!"

The song was covered by most of the female cast of Glee in the season 3 episode "Nationals", with the girls-only show choir called the Troubletones performing the number at the National Show Choir Championship. In 2021, English pop band Years & Years covered the song for the tenth anniversary edition of Born This Way.

== Track listing ==
Digital download

1. "The Edge of Glory" – 5:20

German CD

1. "The Edge of Glory" (radio edit) – 4:20
2. "The Edge of Glory" (Cahill club mix) – 7:26

Digital download (the remixes)

1. "The Edge of Glory" (Sultan & Ned Shepard remix) – 6:34
2. "The Edge of Glory" (Funkagenda remix) – 7:53
3. "The Edge of Glory" (Bare Noize remix) – 3:48
4. "The Edge of Glory" (Porter Robinson remix) – 6:40
5. "The Edge of Glory" (Cahill club remix) – 7:27
6. "The Edge of Glory" (Foster the People remix) – 6:10

== Credits and personnel ==
Credits adapted from the liner notes of Born This Way.

- Lady Gaga – vocals, songwriter, producer, keyboards, background vocals
- Fernando Garibay – songwriter, producer, programming, keyboards
- DJ White Shadow – songwriter and drum programming
- Clarence Clemons – saxophone
- Kareem "Jesus" Devlin – guitars
- Dave Russell – recording at The Living Room Studios, Oslo, Norway; audio mixing at Germano Studios, New York, New York
- Gene Grimaldi – audio mastering at Oasis Mastering, Burbank, California
- George Tanderø – assistant
- Ken Knapstad – assistant
- Kenta Yonesaka – assistant
- Kevin Porter – assistant
- Al Carlson – assistant

== Charts ==
=== Weekly charts ===
Weekly chart performance for "The Edge of Glory"
Chart (2011–2012)	Peak position
Australia (ARIA)	2
Austria (Ö3 Austria Top 40)	3
Belgium (Ultratop 50 Flanders)	6
Belgium (Ultratop 50 Wallonia)	2
Brazil (Brasil Hot 100)	24
Canada Hot 100 (Billboard)	3
Canada AC (Billboard)	2
Canada CHR/Top 40 (Billboard)	3
Canada Hot AC (Billboard)	1
CIS Airplay (TopHit)	28
Croatia International Airplay (HRT)	6
Czech Republic Airplay (ČNS IFPI)	7
Denmark (Tracklisten)	8
Euro Digital Song Sales (Billboard)	2
Finland (Suomen virallinen lista)	14
France (SNEP)	7
Germany (GfK)	3
Greece Digital Songs (Billboard)	6
Hungary (Rádiós Top 40)	3
Hungary (Single Top 40)	6
Iceland (Tónlistinn)	5
Ireland (IRMA)	4
Israel (Media Forest)	3
Italy Airplay (EarOne)	24
Italy (FIMI)	2
Japan Hot 100 (Billboard)	8
Lebanon (The Official Lebanese Top 20)	8
Luxembourg Digital Song Sales (Billboard)	6
Mexico (Billboard Mexican Airplay)	6
Mexico Anglo (Monitor Latino)	10
Netherlands (Dutch Top 40)	36
Netherlands (Single Top 100)	9
New Zealand (Recorded Music NZ)	3
Norway (VG-lista)	2
Portugal Digital Song Sales (Billboard)	9
Russia Airplay (TopHit)	38
Scottish Singles Sales (Official Charts)	2
Slovakia Airplay (ČNS IFPI)	1
South Korea (Circle)	82
South Korea Foreign (Circle)	1
Spain (Promusicae)	5
Sweden (Sverigetopplistan)	19
Switzerland (Schweizer Hitparade)	10
UK Singles (Official Charts)	6
Ukraine Airplay (TopHit)	43
US Billboard Hot 100	3
US Adult Contemporary (Billboard)	7
US Adult Pop Airplay (Billboard)	2
US Dance Club Songs (Billboard)	1
US Dance Airplay (Billboard)	14
US Pop Airplay (Billboard)	3
US Rhythmic Airplay (Billboard)	27

Weekly chart performance for "The Edge of Glory (Years & Years cover)"
Chart (2021)	Peak position
US Hot Dance/Electronic Songs (Billboard)	39

=== Year-end charts ===
Year-end chart performance for "The Edge of Glory"
Chart (2011)	Position
Australia (ARIA)	39
Australia (ARIA Dance)	10
Austria (Ö3 Austria Top 40)	38
Belgium Dance (Ultratop 50 Wallonia)	83
Canada Hot 100 (Billboard)	14
Croatia International Airplay (HRT)	11
France (SNEP)	87
Germany (Official German Charts)	27
Hungary (Rádiós Top 40)	24
Italy (Musica e dischi)	46
Japan Hot 100 (Billboard)	36
New Zealand (Recorded Music NZ)	40
South Korea Foreign (Circle)	44
Switzerland (Schweizer Hitparade)	54
UK Singles (Official Charts)	27
US Billboard Hot 100	29
US Adult Contemporary (Billboard)	17
US Adult Pop Airplay (Billboard)	15
US Dance Club Songs (Billboard)	37
US Pop Airplay (Billboard)	21
US Radio Songs (Billboard)	23

Chart (2012)	Position
US Adult Contemporary (Billboard)	32

== Certifications and sales ==
Certifications and sales for "The Edge of Glory"
Region	Certification	Certified units/sales
Australia (ARIA)	5× Platinum	350,000^{‡}
Austria (IFPI Austria)	Platinum	30,000^{*}
Brazil (Pro-Música Brasil)	3× Platinum	180,000^{‡}
Denmark (IFPI Danmark)	Gold	15,000^{^}
Germany (BVMI)	Gold	150,000^{‡}
Italy (FIMI)	Platinum	30,000^{*}
Japan (RIAJ)	Gold	100,000^{*}
Japan (RIAJ) Full-length ringtone	Gold	100,000^{*}
New Zealand (RMNZ)	Gold	7,500^{*}
Norway (IFPI Norway)	Gold	30,000^{‡}
South Korea	—	392,479
Sweden (GLF)	Platinum	40,000^{‡}
Switzerland (IFPI Switzerland)	Gold	15,000^{^}
United Kingdom (BPI)	2× Platinum	1,200,000^{‡}
United States (RIAA)	4× Platinum	4,000,000^{‡}
^{*} Sales figures based on certification alone.^{^} Shipments figures based on certification alone.^{‡} Sales+streaming figures based on certification alone.

== Release history ==
Release dates and formats for "The Edge of Glory"
Region	Date	Format	Version	Label	Ref.
Various	May 9, 2011	Digital download	Original	Interscope	
France	May 9, 2011	Radio airplay	Original	Universal	
Italy	May 13, 2011	Radio airplay	Original	Universal	
Brazil	May 16, 2011	Digital download	Original	Universal	
United States	May 17, 2011	Contemporary hit radio	Original	Streamline; KonLive; Interscope	
Germany	July 8, 2011	CD single	Original	Interscope	
Italy	July 12, 2011	CD single	Original	Universal	
United States	July 12, 2011	Digital EP	Remixes	Interscope	
Various	July 15, 2011	Digital EP	Remixes	Interscope	
United Kingdom	July 18, 2011	CD single	Original	Universal; Interscope	
Poland	July 22, 2011	CD single	Original	Universal Poland	
Taiwan	July 22, 2011	CD single	Original	Universal	

== See also ==
- List of Billboard Hot 100 top-ten singles in 2011
- List of number-one dance singles of 2011 (U.S.)
- List of number-one international songs of 2011 (South Korea)
