= Meat dress =

Meat dress may refer to:

- Vanitas: Flesh Dress for an Albino Anorectic, created in 1987 by artist Jana Sterbak
- Lady Gaga's meat dress, worn at the 2010 MTV Video Music Awards
