= Born This Way Ball =

2012–13 concert tour by Lady Gaga

The Born This Way Ball
- World tour by Lady Gaga
- Promotional poster
- Location: Africa; Asia; Europe; North America; Oceania; South America
- Associated album: Born This Way
- Start date: April 27, 2012
- End date: February 11, 2013
- Legs: 6
- No. of shows: 98
- Supporting acts: Zedd; Lady Starlight; The Darkness; Madeon
- Box office: $183.9 million ($254.18 in 2025 dollars)

Lady Gaga concert chronology
- The Monster Ball Tour (2009–2011); Born This Way Ball (2012–2013); ArtRave (2013)

The Born This Way Ball was the third concert tour by American singer Lady Gaga, in support of her second studio album Born This Way (2011). The tour visited every populated continent, and was ranked as the fifth highest-grossing tour of 2012 by Pollstar. The tour grossed $22.5 million in 2013 according to Pollstar's year-end chart from the 18 dates played, bringing the Born This Way Ball Tour's total gross to $183.9 million from 98 dates. The tour was well received by critics who praised the stage design, Gaga's vocal abilities and different expressive messages.

On February 13, 2013, after already announcing the postponement of shows in Chicago, Detroit, and Hamilton two days earlier due to an injury, Live Nation and Lady Gaga confirmed the cancellation of the remaining tour dates following her diagnosis with a labral tear of the right hip, caused by strenuous repetitive movements during the performances. She subsequently underwent surgery to repair the damage.

== Background and development ==
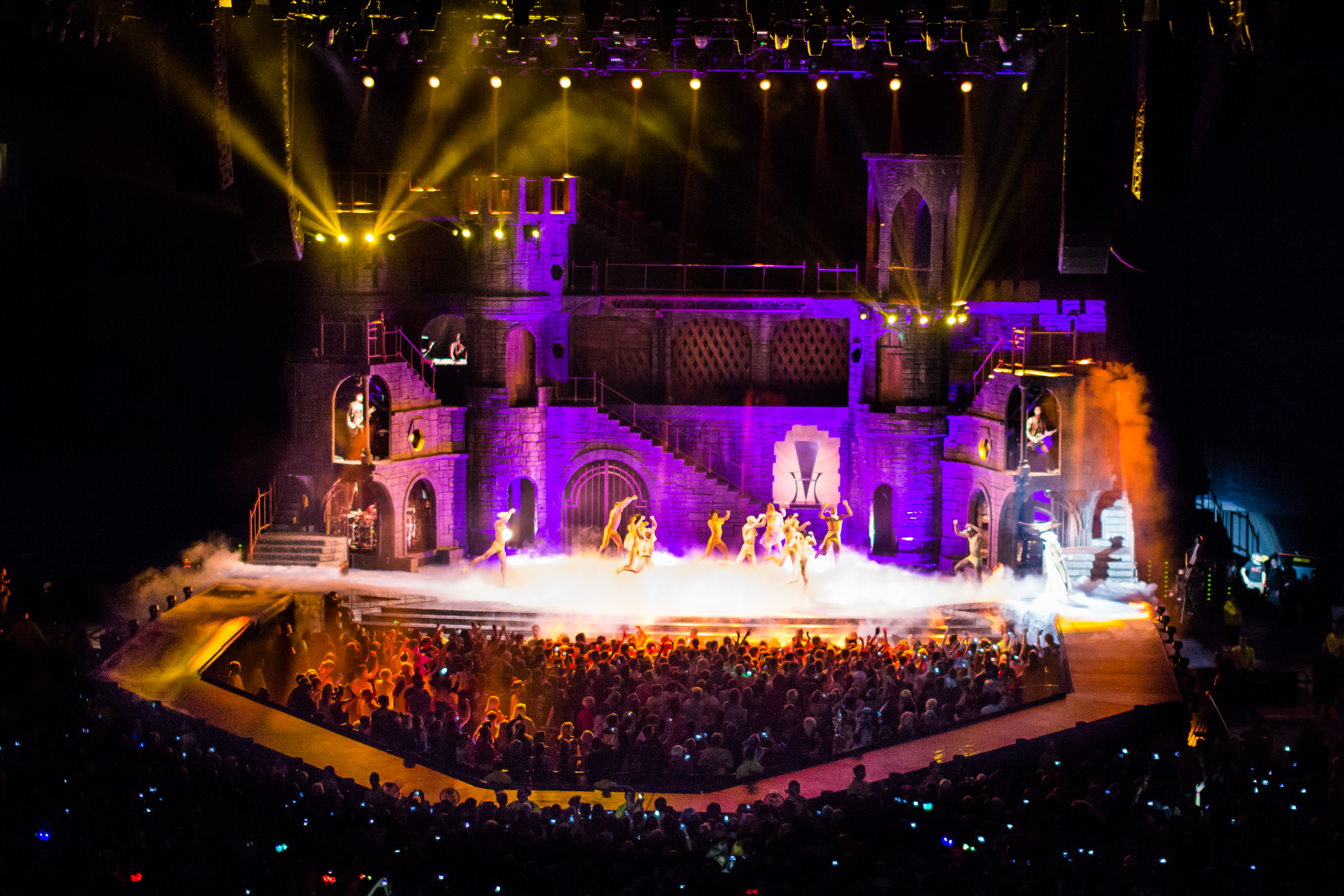
The stage for the tour, displaying the medieval castle

Upon the release of "Judas", the second single from Born This Way, Lady Gaga confirmed in an interview that she would embark on a concert tour in 2012, in which she would visit Latin American countries for the first time, like Brazil, Chile and Colombia, and would be returning to Mexico. In November 2011, producer DJ White Shadow asserted that Gaga was "doing [work] for the next round of touring", adding that the singer's main objective in the following year was to continue preparing for the Born This Way Ball, as well as write new songs for her next studio album. Fernando Garibay, who began collaborating with Gaga on The Fame Monster (2009), felt that Born This Way was one of his most personal moments. He opined: "This album was the most personal [because of] the amount of detail that went into this record, the amount of passion [and] emotion from her and the team. Every song was a story towards the 'Born This Way' theme. We're excited now, putting that into the tour and expressing that on a live performance level." In comparison to her previous tour, Garibay affirmed that the shows of the Born This Way Ball would be more "exaggerated".

A promotional poster of the tour was released on February 7, 2012, which was described by Billboard's Ray Waddell as a "bizarre poster that portrays the ball as a campy, medieval-meets-the-80's kingdom." It features Gaga's face hovering over dark clouds looking down from the sky, and includes colors such as neon-purple and turquoise. She is also fused into a keytar, standing near her dancers in front of a medieval castle. The first leg for the Born This Way Ball was announced the following day, revealing that Gaga would perform several concerts in Asia, including in Hong Kong, Singapore and South Korea. Additional dates were added to the Asia-Pacific leg on February 15, 2012. Live Nation Global Touring CEO Arthur Fogel and his team would steer around the tour, as they did the bulk of The Monster Ball Tour (2010–11). Fogel explained that "The last tour established [Gaga] as a major act worldwide and I believe this tour will be an extension of that, particularly considering we're going to territories she's never been in, like Southeast Asia and Latin America."

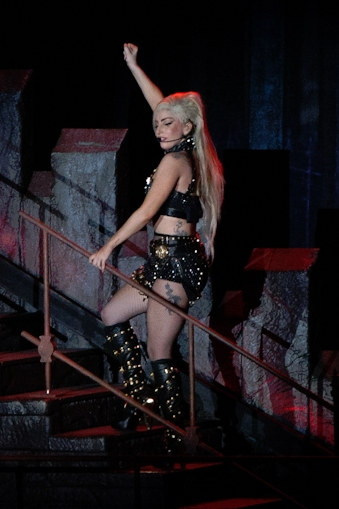
Lady Gaga performing "The Edge of Glory" in a Versace-designed outfit. Donatella Versace provided multiple costumes for the tour.

A European leg was announced in March 2012, which consisted of 21 dates over a period of two months, kicking-off in Sofia, Bulgaria, and concluding in Spain. Soon thereafter, German electronic musician Zedd was declared as Gaga's opening act for the Asian leg of the tour, while longtime collaborator Lady Starlight and British glam rock band The Darkness were approached as opening acts for the European portion of the tour. On their website, The Darkness stated that they were "honoured to announce their addition to the bill as main support for Lady Gaga's Born This Way Ball tour 2012." Dates for Latin America were announced on August 6, 2012, via Twitter. There were two initial dates in North America and four in South America, with more soon added.

Gaga evaluated the tour as an "electro-metal pop-opera" and "the tale of the Beginning, the genesis of the Kingdom of Fame. How we were birthed and how we will die celebrating." Dance rehearsals were held for approximately one month. In February 2012, Gaga revealed that she would release visuals of the show's stage set via Twitter. The singer unveiled a sketch of the stage design, which was created by Gaga herself along with her creative team, Haus of Gaga. She tweeted: "I'm so excited. The Haus has been working so hard, we can't wait for you to see it!! Love you Little Monsters, have the time of your life." The stage was built over a period of several months, and was modeled after a medieval-gothic castle, featuring tall viewing towers, intricate carvings and a large catwalk to interact with the floor audience. The spectacle required at least 15 trailers to move the castle onto the stage, each one measuring nearly 53 feet (16.15 m) long. The area enclosed by the catwalk was described by Gaga as "The Monster Pit". "The Monster Pit is General Admission only, and Little Monsters [...] unlock it when they arrive to the arena or stadium. Entry to The Monster Pit is relegated [...] to the fans who have arrived first, waited all night, [...] dressed to 'Ball.' Every night Haus of Gaga will choose fans from The Monster Pit to come back stage and meet me! These tickets are not more expensive. No dress code requirement. Born This Way means anything goes."

As part of an advertising campaign in the weeks prior to the tour, sketches of four costumes designed by Giorgio Armani were released to the press; Armani previously dressed Gaga for the 52nd Annual Grammy Awards, and later, on The Monster Ball Tour. Many other costumes on the tour were created by Donatella Versace.

== Concert synopsis ==
The show was set in and around a large medieval-style land and castle, dubbed the "Kingdom of Fame", which rotated and maneuvered throughout. A classical score accompanied the concert's interludes, tying-in with the dark, operatic themes. The show began with "Highway Unicorn (Road to Love)", featuring an extended intro in which Gaga performed atop a manually operated "horse" puppet built exclusively by The Jim Henson Company. After the opening number, the stage went dark and spotlights were shone across the stage with a helicopter sound being played. The audience then heard "Mother G.O.A.T." speak for the first time, stating that "alien fugitive Lady Gaga has escaped", and that "Operation: Kill the Bitch" was in order. Gaga appeared in an alien-like costume for "Government Hooker", in which she pretended to seduce a dancer, dressed in a suit, before "killing" him and leaving the stage. Gaga's dancers then re-enacted the "birth" scene of "Born This Way", as Gaga groaned and simulated being in labor, before exiting a zipper-like "vagina" of a large, inflatable body.

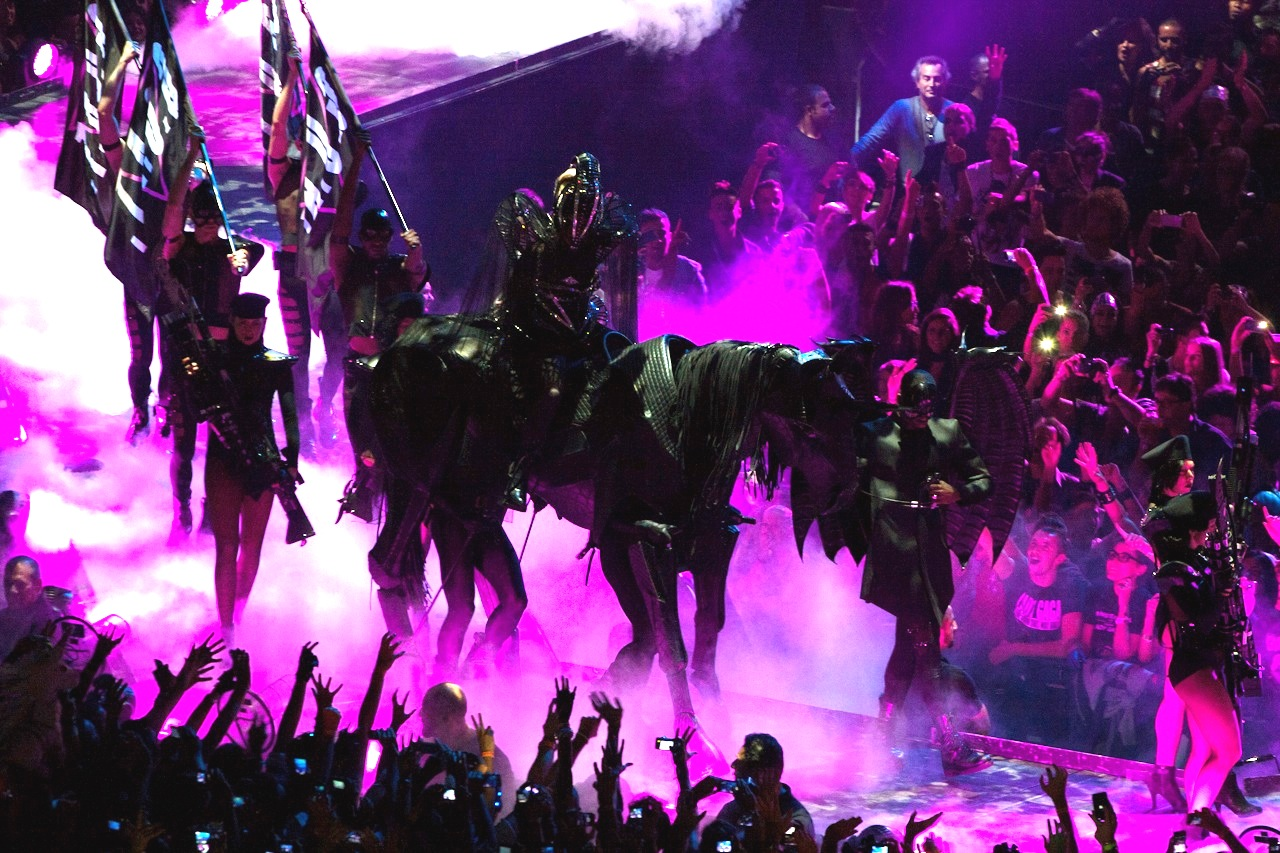
Lady Gaga opening the show with the performance of "Highway Unicorn (Road to Love)" atop a fully puppeteered horse

After "Black Jesus + Amen Fashion" and "Bloody Mary", an interlude commenced, and the opening dialogue of the music video of "Born This Way" could be heard For "Bad Romance", Gaga arrived on stage inside of a vessel. Following this, she escaped to the top of the castle for "Judas", before escaping and performing "Fashion of His Love" and "Just Dance". During "LoveGame", a clear bathtub, built on the stage, featured Gaga singing inside. After a break and brief chat from the singer, in which she thanked the audience for coming to the show, "Telephone" was performed, with its original choreography. An interlude followed, with Mother G.O.A.T. describing "Gaga's takeover of planet earth". "Heavy Metal Lover" was performed next; Gaga appeared atop the body of a motor-"tricycle" with her arms in two slots, a recreation of her album cover. Gaga drove-around the Monster Pit, followed by choreography for the last chorus of the song. After "Bad Kids", an acoustic section followed with songs like "Hair", "Princess Die", and "You and I". The section concluded with "Electric Chapel", with a display of flashing lights before Gaga left the stage.

After a Spanish guitar intro, Gaga then returned in a recreation of her iconic meat dress for "Americano". "Poker Face" was next; at the end of the song, Gaga was lowered into a "meat grinder", before later emerging from the stage sitting on a "meat couch" to perform "Alejandro" in a gun-bra and green trousers. The castle closed with an interlude and blue lights. Mother G.O.A.T. flew about the castle, mouthing the words of the first verse of "Paparazzi", until Gaga returned to "kill" her with her new disco-stick. Gaga then gave a speech about how there are "no boundaries in music", before performing "Scheiße". After the song, the stage went black. Moments later, Gaga was seen in one of the castle towers for "The Edge of Glory" and the final song, "Marry the Night". When the show ended, Gaga and her dancers were lowered off-stage and the castle went dark.

== Critical response ==
=== Asia, Oceania and South Africa ===
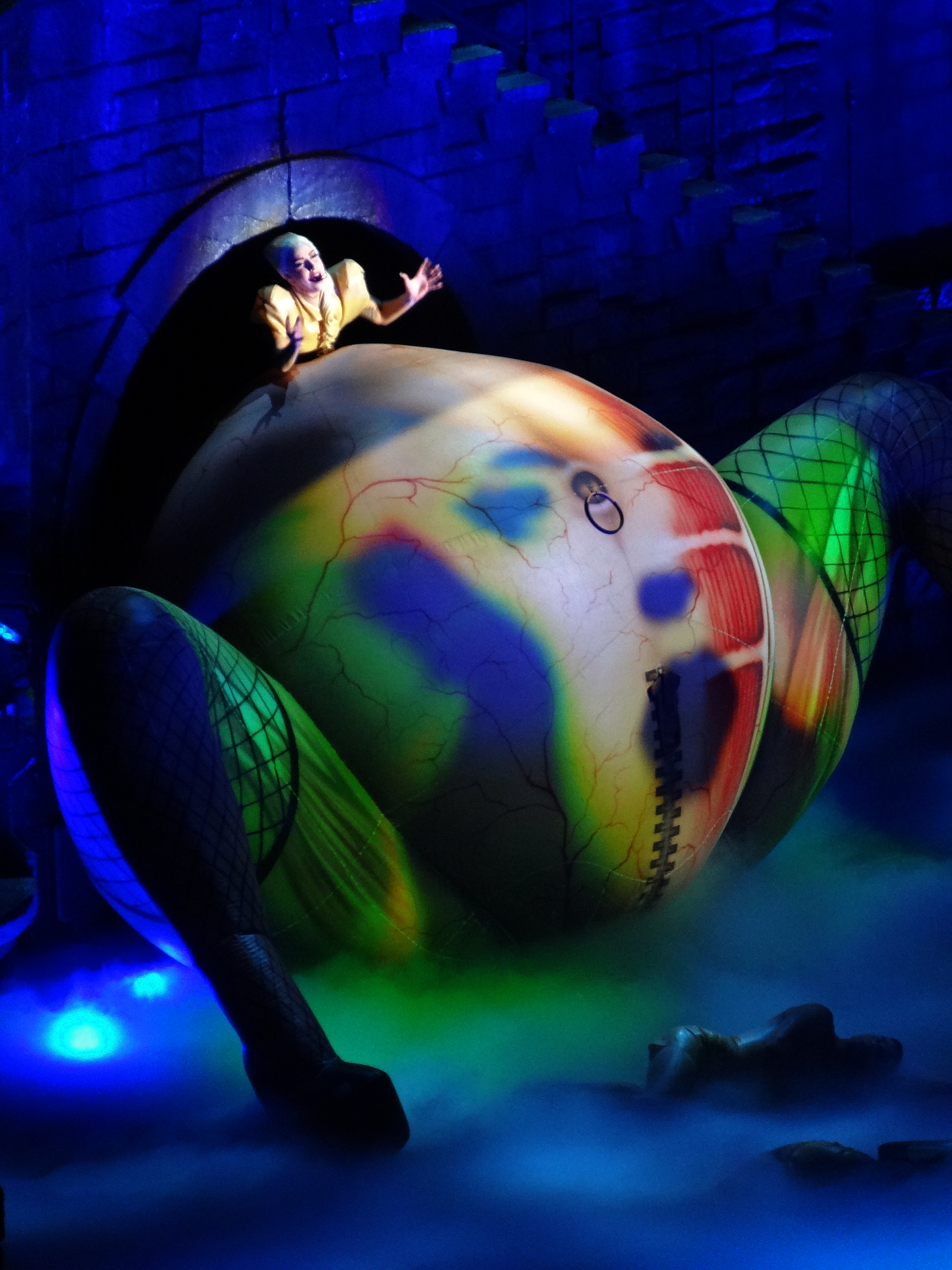
Lady Gaga beginning the performance of "Born This Way" with a birth scene

The Korea Herald journalist Cho Chung-un opined that Gaga "captivated the audience" with what he described as "innovative and breathtaking stage installations and ideas" during the performance. Writing for the same publication, Emma Kalka complemented Gaga's wardrobe, and cited several segments, such as her "Americano" performance, as highlights of the concert. To Kwaak Je-yup of The Korea Times, the performance demonstrated Gaga's abilities as a performing artist, stating: "Friday night was Lady Gaga at her best, fusing fashion and designs with great melodies and dance moves."

A writer for MTV noted the elaborate visuals of the show with its "Gothic castle backdrop and myriad costume changes", concluding that it was "clear that Gaga has outdone even her own Monster Ball in terms of spectacle." Elizabeth Soh of Yahoo! gave a positive review of the Singapore concert, describing it as "at times shocking, raunchy, mellow and just plain bizarre." The New Zealand Herald felt that it was "obvious Gaga believes in her message, you can feel it in her voice. [That] Behind all the lights, glitz, meat, guns and exploding bras is a singer of exceptional talent". Regarding her first show in Brisbane, the Brisbane Times gave it five stars, writing that it was "pure pop theatre", and that "the crowd was simply lost in the Gaga experience. Sean Sennet of The Australian commented that the show was "An extravaganza in every sense" and will be "remembered as a benchmark tour."

Simon Sweetman of New Zealand's Stuff.co.nz praised the tour's three nights in Auckland as the best pop concerts since Janet Jackson's The Velvet Rope Tour (1998-99). South African publication The New Age gave Gaga's performance in Johannesburg five stars, stating that "Gaga's energy teamed with a bevy of spectacular dancers made for an electric show". South African newspaper The Times's Nikita Ramkissoon shared in this praise, writing that she "was really taken by was her natural talent... From arriving on stage on a horse, birthing herself, dancing dripping with sex and magnificence, Black Jesus and legs splayed open on an armchair made of meat, this performance was nothing short of spectacular. Every minute of it... Everyone [she] know who was there was blown away. You just had to be there to see how impressive it was".

=== Europe ===
The Born This Way Ball was labelled as the "best show of the year" and "one of the most amazing events in years in Lithuania" by Lithuanian publication ATN. Neil McCormick of The Daily Telegraph awarded the Born This Way Ball in Helsinki four stars, writing that the show "is quite spectacular... and quite spectacularly bonkers", mentioning that Gaga "occupies pole position as the 21st centuries ultimate pop star". Swedish news corporation Expressen gave the show five stars, believing that "her two and a half hour show is by far the most lavish and eccentric [they'd] ever seen", complementing Gaga's "flashes of humour... and smart political digs", and the show's intimacy and promotion of self-expression and love. The Guardian gave the show four out of five stars, stating that "The tightly choreographed hits sound terrific, but it's when this curious star sabotages the slickness that she seems most herself". Regarding her performance at the O_{2} World in Berlin, Berliner Morgenpost reported that "unlike Madonna, whose artificial spectacle you could experience at the same place, the younger rival is cheeky, fresh, uncompromising". Norwegian newspaper Verdens Gang gave it a mixed review, admiring her voice, but saying that "if we are going to talk about content, it is similar [to Madonna's]. Gaga hardly says anything Madonna didn't say 25 years ago" adding that "But I have a feeling that she is a less interesting pop-artist than many of us had hoped for. Lady Gaga so often praised for being "original", is mostly very un-original."

=== North America ===
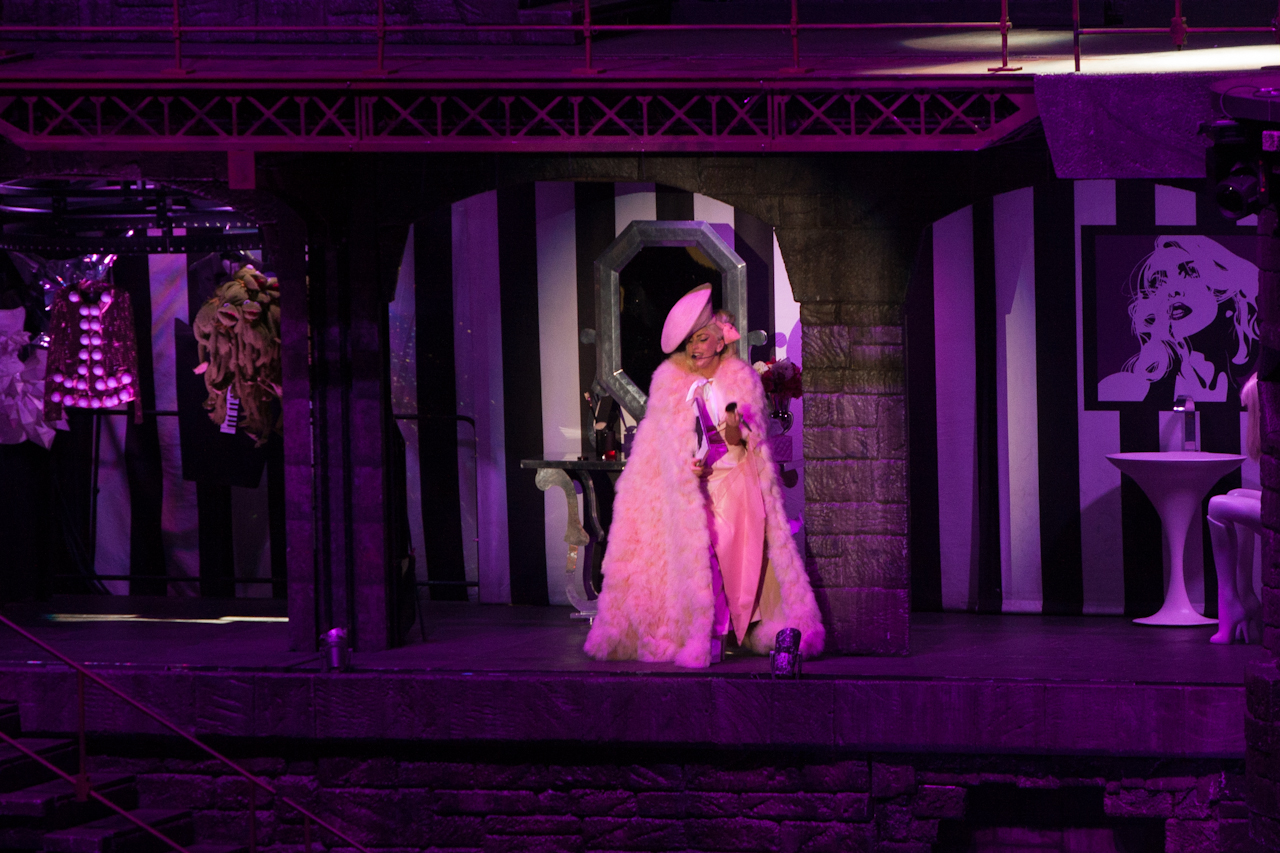
Gaga performing "Fashion of His Love", in a set described by one journalist as a "Barbie house"

Reviews of the North American leg were mostly positive; in the Vancouver Sun, François Marchand praised the show, stating that "Unlike Madonna, whose latest Vancouver appearance was dominated by violent imagery and a borderline bullying attitude toward her longtime fans, Gaga continued to carry her trademark message of empowerment and self-love". Jeva Lange's review in Seattle Weekly of the Tacoma show echoed the praise given to the Vancouver shows, believing that "her voice, costumes, and lyrical honesty were not only completely unforgettable, they were inspiring". Rich Lopez from the Dallas Voice praised the show and Gaga's "relentlessness in giving a dynamic performance", saying that "She shocked, she touched, she served diva realness, and like those four fans onstage (as well as the ones who joined her in the "Marry the Night" finale), she made everyone feel special." The Arizona Republic's Joe Golfen also gave the Phoenix show a positive review, stating: "The nearly two-and-a-half hour show, a stop on her worldwide Born This Way Ball, highlighted everything that has made Lady Gaga such a phenomenon. There were outrageous outfits, elaborate set pieces, sexy dance numbers, and messages of self-respect and gay rights. Plus, all those hit songs." Golfen also added: "That packed arena of screaming fans made it clear that her star wasn't going to be fading away anytime soon."

Other North American reports were more critical, such as Emily Zemler of The Hollywood Reporter giving the Los Angeles show a mixed review, writing: "The music was, at best, secondary to the grab-bag, highly produced performance... It was almost as though the singer decided to indulge every possible idea anyone ever had for her live show simultaneously". Jim Harrington from the Oakland Tribune gave the San Jose concert a negative review, saying that the "production is so over-the-top that it completely buries the music", adding that "the level of enthusiasm [of the fans] definitely seemed to peak early in the concert."

== Commercial performance ==
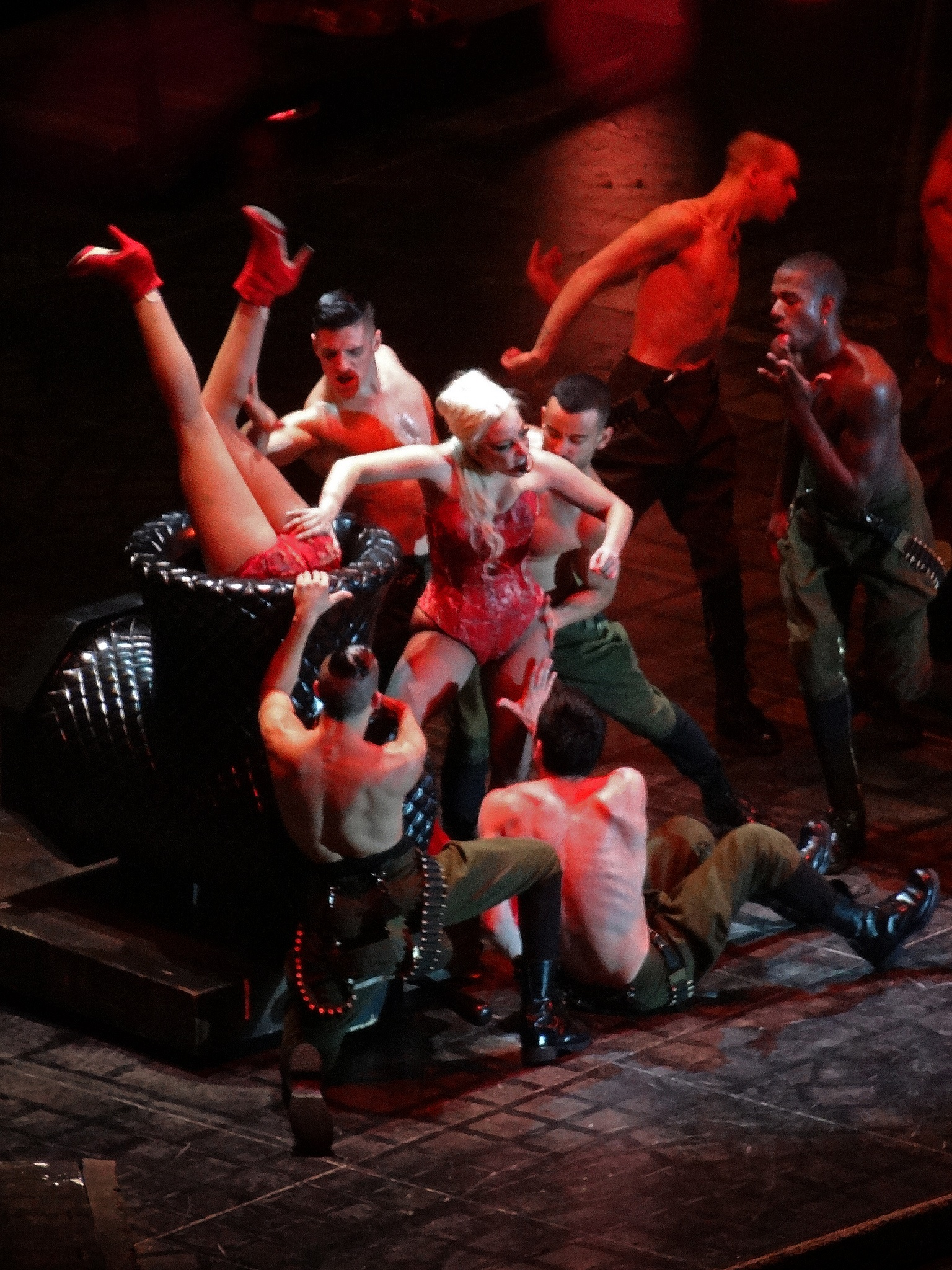
Lady Gaga performing "Poker Face", wearing a re-creation of her meat dress

Tickets for the tour brought tremendous commercial success across several Asian and Australian markets. Tickets for the Asia-Pacific leg of the Born This Way Ball became available on February 17, 2012, through Ticketek and Ticketmaster. Shortly after being made available, tickets for the first two of the three Auckland shows were sold-out. In response to positive ticket sales in New Zealand and Australia, nine additional concerts were scheduled as part of the Asia-Pacific leg. In Hong Kong, an estimated 6,000 presale tickets became available on February 24 for two originally scheduled shows; these were sold-out within three hours, prompting Live Nation to add three more dates (for a total of five sold-out shows) in Hong Kong. Additional sellouts and positive commercial results were reported for the successive performances in Hong Kong, as well as in Taipei, Saitama, (Note: Promoted as Tokyo) Bangkok, Singapore, Seoul,and Jakarta, where approximately half of the available tickets were sold within the first two hours of sales and the concert later sold out.

Similar successes were echoed in European markets. Several British publications indicated that presale tickets in the United Kingdom were selling beyond the demand. Industry analysts suggested that based on internet searches that an estimated two million people could attempt to purchase a ticket out of the 75,000 that were issued for the London and Manchester dates. Tickets became available for general sale on April 13, 2012; the London event sold out in a record-breaking 50 seconds, while the Manchester concert sold out under ten minutes. Several European ticketing sites crashed when the tickets went on sale, including Sweden, Finland and Spain, where the Barcelona pre-sale fastly sold out; more than 22,000 people attended her outdoor concert in Bucharest, Romania. Both Russian dates sold out in hours. The biggest crowd on the tour was in Saint-Denis (Note: Promoted as Paris) at the Stade de France on September 22, 2012, when Gaga, with 71,000 people in attendance, became the youngest artist to ever grace the stadium until Rihanna scheduled a date at the Stade de France on her Diamonds World Tour for June 2013.

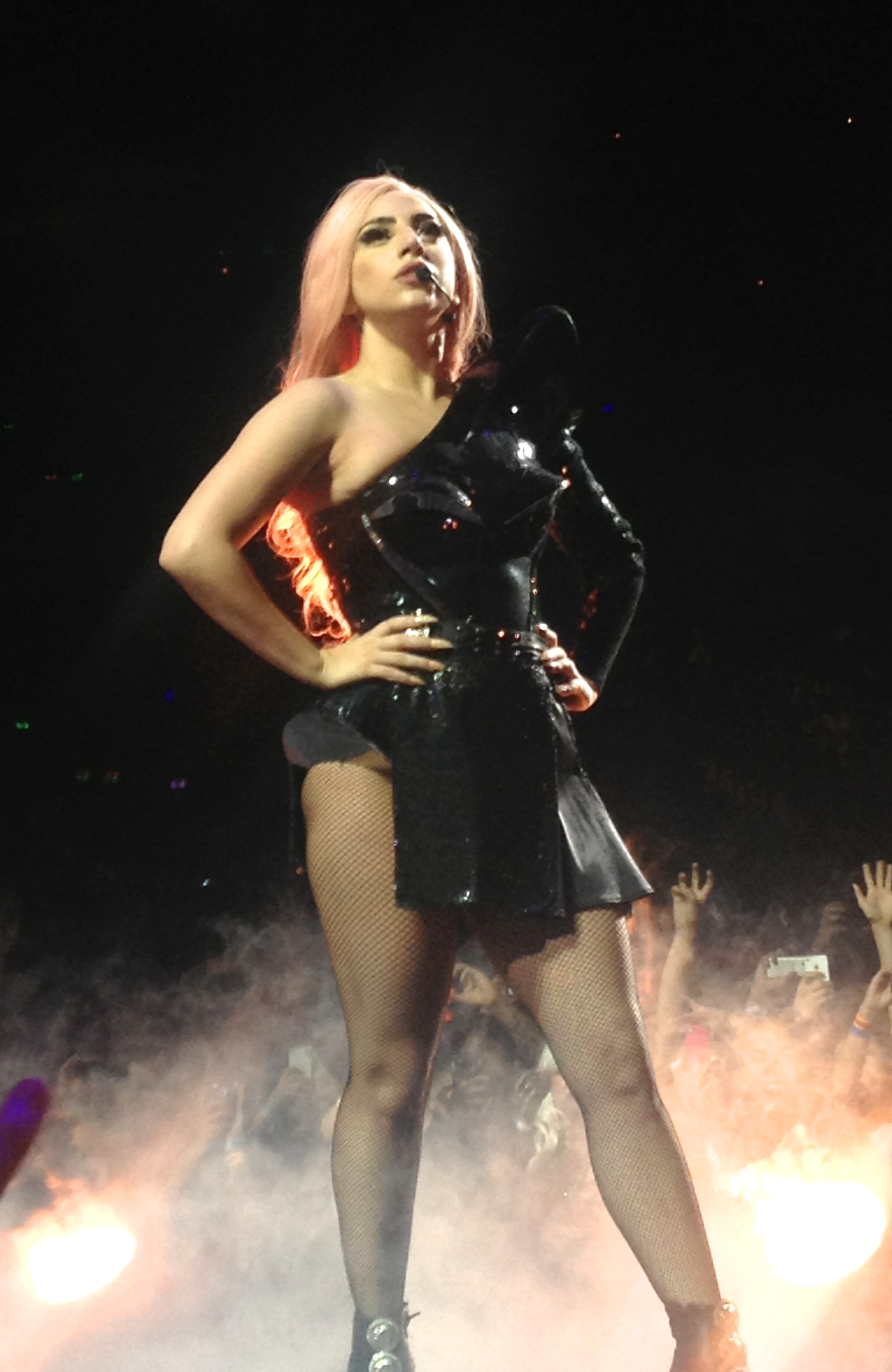
Lady Gaga posing on a catwalk that encompasses the "Monster Pit"

The high demand for tickets continued in Africa. When tickets went on sale for the two dates in South Africa, the ticket retailer Computicket's online ticketing servers crashed under the pressure from the high volume of fans trying to buy tickets to the concerts. Before the crash, some fans experienced extremely long waiting times in online queues, up to two hours, and at one point it was reported that over 26,000 people were still waiting to purchase tickets online. As a result, Computicket decided to cease online ticket sale until the following morning.

Despite the worldwide commercial success of the tour, it was not very well received by the South American market, largely due to ticketing and pricing issues, as well as availability. In Colombia, for example, some tickets were sold at half of their original price to increase total sales, generating widespread criticism from fans who had bought tickets at their original prices; the production company also made an offer to fans who had bought tickets at their original prices, in which they could receive a second free ticket for the same show with a price-adjusted refund, or a full refund. To increase sales of the three concerts in Brazil, special offers were made, including a two-for-one special for standing-room-only sections, as well as a "ten-installments-with-no-interest" payment plan for tickets. In Chile, demand was comparatively higher than in the rest of South America; however, tickets for each respective date were not made immediately available. The production company then had to make additional special offers, two weeks before the show, including a two-for-one offer for standing-room-only sections, and reducing the prices for most of the tickets. In Peru, tickets were sold at their original prices.

The North American leg of the tour additionally experienced strong ticket sales. By the time the final 21 dates of the tour had been canceled on February 13, the entire leg had been nearly sold out. Had the entire leg been completed, the tour would have topped $200 million in ticket sales. The cancellation of the last 21 dates resulted in refunds of over $25 million and 200,000 tickets. With more than twenty dates left, Gaga was forced to cancel the remaining tour dates due to sustaining a hip injury that required surgery. With the dates of the tour that were successfully completed, Gaga grossed more than $160 million.

== Controversies ==
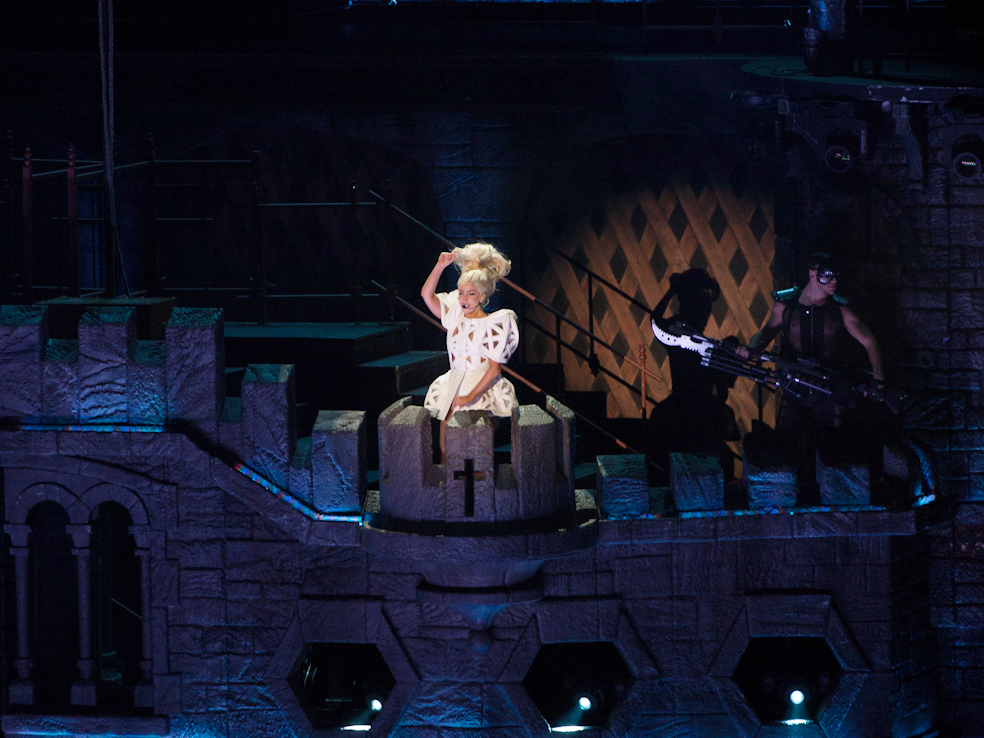
Gaga atop the medieval castle prop while performing "Judas". The song was controversial among religious groups during the Asian leg of the Born This Way Ball.

The tour became a subject to numerous controversies. In South Korea, the Korea Media Rating Board have deemed Gaga and the tour too sexual for under-18's and have banned them from attending. Numerous religious groups in the Philippines accused Gaga of blasphemy and threatened to sue her due to the song "Judas" and protested to cancel the show in the country. Archbishop Ramon Arguelles also urged the general public to boycott the Manila show of the tour. "Her fans are in danger of falling into the clutches of Satan," Arguelles said. This was supported as well by former Manila mayor Lito Atienza as he condemned Gaga's song "Judas". "We respect freedom of expression in this country. We also appreciate art and culture... but the laws should be respected," he said. Gaga responded to the protests in the country during the show, "I'm not a creature of your government, Manila" and said on twitter "And don't worry, if I get thrown in jail in Manila, Beyonce will just bail me out."

The planned show in Indonesia was cancelled due to threats from extremist groups like the Islamic Defenders Front. The group called Gaga the "messenger of the devil" and threatened violence if she stepped off the plane. Indonesian police also refused to issue a permit for the show, claiming it is too vulgar. Police had said they would only issue a permit for the concert if Gaga agreed to tone down the show. However, Gaga refused to do so, therefore cancelling the show. Islamic Defenders Front chairman, Habib Salim Alatas, said the cancellation was "good news" for Indonesia's Muslims. "FPI [Islamic Defenders Front group] is grateful that she [Lady Gaga] has decided not to come. Indonesians will be protected from sin brought about by this Mother Monster, the destroyer of morals," he told. Indonesia's conservative Religious Affairs Minister, Suryadharma Ali, also welcomed the cancellation. "I strongly believe this cancellation will benefit the country. Indonesians need entertainment and art which have moral values." Hours after the cancellation, Gaga posted on Twitter (now X), responding to the controversy, "There is nothing holy about hatred" and said to her Indonesian fans, "I'm so very sorry to the fans and just as devastated as you, if not more. You are everything to me."

In Thailand, Gaga sparked an online uproar when she tweeted: "I just landed in Bangkok baby! Ready for 50,000 screaming Thai monsters. I wanna get lost in a lady market and buy fake Rolex." Several of Gaga's fans felt that the tweet was racist and viewed it as a negative stereotype. Several Thai celebrities reacted like Surahit Siamwalla, saying on twitter "We are more civilized than you think," and calls for a boycott of the Bangkok show due to that. Gaga made clear the issue of referencing the incident on the Hong Kong show of the tour. "I love this city, you can work out & buy a fake Birkin on the same street.", she tweeted. The following month, weeks after her concert in Thailand, several members of the country filed a public lawsuit against Gaga for misuse of the Thailand flag. The complaints came from when Gaga while wearing an accessorized and provocative bikini costume with a traditional Thai headdress, rode a motorcycle across the stage with a Thai flag tied to it. Government officials in the country deemed the act as "not appropriate" and felt that it "hurt the feelings of Thai People".

During the Melbourne show on June 27, 2012, Gaga debuted a new song called "Princess Die", about suicide and mental illness. The song's lyrics, including lines such as "I wish that I was strong/I wish that I was wrong/I wish that I could cope/but I took pills and left a note" were slammed as "distasteful" by suicide charities, who feared the message about the suicide that the song portrayed. Chris Wagner of Lifeline, an international crisis support service, stated, "Lifeline is very concerned about the nature of the song, particularly as it clearly describes the method of suicide and talks in depth about suicide. It doesn't actually have any message of hope, of help seeking, or anything of a positive nature whatsoever." The song's references to Diana, Princess of Wales and her death also caused offense and outrage, despite Gaga attempting to distance herself from such controversy by clearly spelling out the name of the song during her concert.

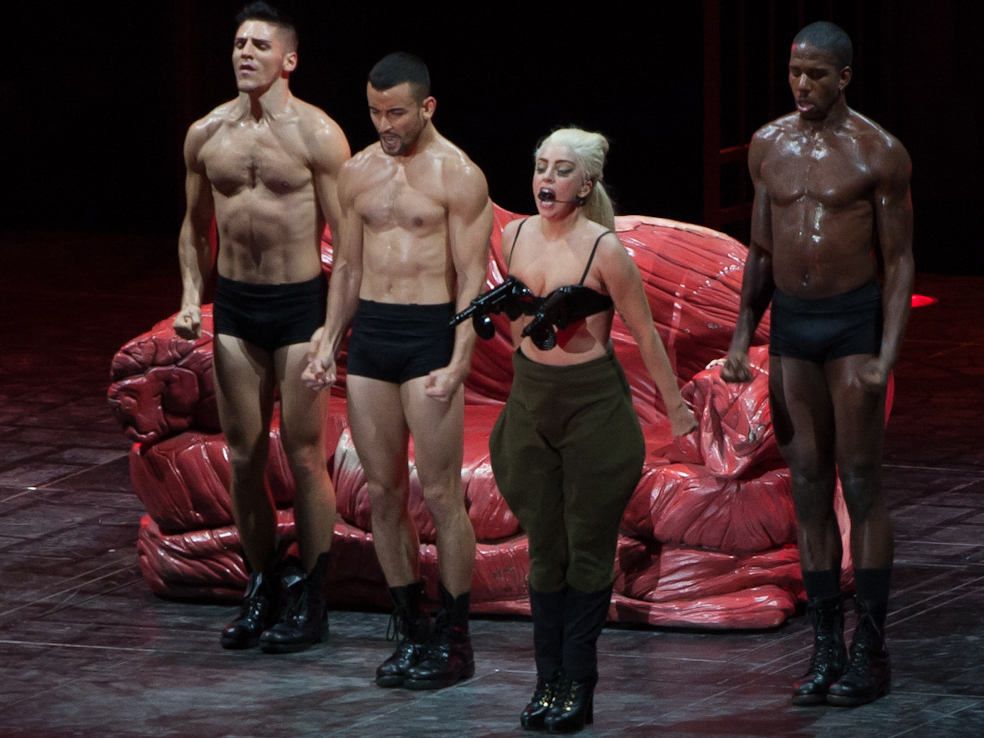
Lady Gaga with her dancers during "Alejandro", wearing her gun bra

In Russia, authorities threatened Gaga to arrest or a $50,000 fine if she will speak up for the LGBTQ+ community in her concert in the country. Vitaly Milonov, a member of the ruling United Russia party in the St. Petersburg assembly and the architect of a city law that bans gay "propaganda", accused the singer of breaking the law at the beginning of her show. "We saw that in addition to music, songs and such, there were direct calls for 12-year-old citizens to support the LGBT (lesbian, gay, bisexual and transgender) community," Milonov said, adding that he would file a complaint to prosecutors over the singer's actions. Gaga defied during the show by announcing, "My name is Lady Gaga. I'm 26 years old. I'm from Manhattan, New York. And I believe that men and women deserve to love each other equally. Cuff me Russia, Arrest me! I don't give a f*ck!". Although she was not arrested, the promoters of the concert were fined and Gaga was banned from visiting the country.

During the Vancouver show, Gaga received criticisms on her gun bra that she wears during "Alejandro" performance. The bra was slammed as being insensitive so soon after the Newtown, Connecticut gun massacre in which 20 children and six adults were killed. Sharon Osbourne, whose daughter Kelly Osbourne has been in a public war of words with Lady Gaga on an unrelated issue, took the opportunity to add her voice to the criticism. "Everything is guns, guns, guns," she said about Gaga's gun bra. "This is not right, and she should be stopped. All I'm asking her to do is to stay true to her foundation, which she said (to help in making) the world to be a braver, kinder world." Ladd Everitt, a spokesperson for the U.S. group Coalition to Stop Gun Violence told Britain's The Sun that Gaga's actions were irresponsible: "What is the point of this gun porn? It's no different than a guy who poses with an assault rifle to look tough or send out a political message." Gaga removed the gun bra and replaced it with a regular one during the segment of the show, for the rest of the tour.

== Set list ==
This set list is representative of the first show in Los Angeles. It does not represent all dates throughout the tour.

1. "Highway Unicorn (Road to Love)"
2. "Government Hooker"
3. "Born This Way"
4. "Black Jesus + Amen Fashion"
5. "Bloody Mary"
6. "Bad Romance"
7. "Judas"
8. "Fashion of His Love"
9. "Just Dance"
10. "LoveGame"
11. "Telephone"
12. "Hair"
13. "Electric Chapel"
14. "Heavy Metal Lover"
15. "Bad Kids"
16. "The Queen"
17. "You and I"
18. "Americano"
19. "Poker Face"
20. "Alejandro"
21. "Paparazzi"
22. "Scheiße"

Encore

23. "The Edge of Glory"
24. "Marry the Night"

Notes

- On select dates, Gaga performed her unreleased song, "Princess Die".
- During the two performances in London, Gaga performed a cover of John Lennon's "Imagine".

== Shows ==
List of 2012 shows
Date	City	Country	Venue	Opening act	Attendance	Revenue
April 27	Seoul	South Korea	Seoul Olympic Stadium	Zedd	51,684 / 51,684	$3,084,172
May 2	Hong Kong	China	AsiaWorld–Arena	Zedd	51,613 / 51,613	$7,893,195
May 3	Hong Kong	China	AsiaWorld–Arena	Zedd	51,613 / 51,613	$7,893,195
May 5	Hong Kong	China	AsiaWorld–Arena	Zedd	51,613 / 51,613	$7,893,195
May 7	Hong Kong	China	AsiaWorld–Arena	Zedd	51,613 / 51,613	$7,893,195
May 10	Saitama	Japan	Saitama Super Arena	Zedd	96,550 / 96,550	$18,339,701
May 12	Saitama	Japan	Saitama Super Arena	Zedd	96,550 / 96,550	$18,339,701
May 13	Saitama	Japan	Saitama Super Arena	Zedd	96,550 / 96,550	$18,339,701
May 17	Taipei	Taiwan	TWTC Nangang Exhibition Hall	Zedd	22,173 / 22,173	$4,274,243
May 18	Taipei	Taiwan	TWTC Nangang Exhibition Hall	Zedd	22,173 / 22,173	$4,274,243
May 21	Pasay (Note: Promoted as Manila)	Philippines	Mall of Asia Arena	Zedd	18,915 / 18,915	$1,275,387
May 22	Pasay	Philippines	Mall of Asia Arena	Zedd	18,915 / 18,915	$1,275,387
May 25	Bangkok	Thailand	Rajamangala National Stadium	Zedd	41,478 / 41,478	$4,299,376
May 28	Singapore		Singapore Indoor Stadium	Zedd	30,952 / 30,952	$4,744,331
May 29	Singapore		Singapore Indoor Stadium	Zedd	30,952 / 30,952	$4,744,331
May 31	Singapore		Singapore Indoor Stadium	Zedd	30,952 / 30,952	$4,744,331
June 7	Auckland	New Zealand	Vector Arena	Lady Starlight	34,367 / 34,367	$3,669,324
June 8	Auckland	New Zealand	Vector Arena	Lady Starlight	34,367 / 34,367	$3,669,324
June 10	Auckland	New Zealand	Vector Arena	Lady Starlight	34,367 / 34,367	$3,669,324
June 13	Brisbane	Australia	Brisbane Entertainment Centre	Lady Starlight	31,326 / 31,326	$4,289,453
June 14	Brisbane	Australia	Brisbane Entertainment Centre	Lady Starlight	31,326 / 31,326	$4,289,453
June 16	Brisbane	Australia	Brisbane Entertainment Centre	Lady Starlight	31,326 / 31,326	$4,289,453
June 20	Sydney	Australia	Allphones Arena	Lady Starlight	54,774 / 54,774	$7,563,088
June 21	Sydney	Australia	Allphones Arena	Lady Starlight	54,774 / 54,774	$7,563,088
June 23	Sydney	Australia	Allphones Arena	Lady Starlight	54,774 / 54,774	$7,563,088
June 24	Sydney	Australia	Allphones Arena	Lady Starlight	54,774 / 54,774	$7,563,088
June 27	Melbourne	Australia	Rod Laver Arena	Lady Starlight	60,031 / 60,031	$8,169,642
June 28	Melbourne	Australia	Rod Laver Arena	Lady Starlight	60,031 / 60,031	$8,169,642
June 30	Melbourne	Australia	Rod Laver Arena	Lady Starlight	60,031 / 60,031	$8,169,642
July 1	Melbourne	Australia	Rod Laver Arena	Lady Starlight	60,031 / 60,031	$8,169,642
July 3	Melbourne	Australia	Rod Laver Arena	Lady Starlight	60,031 / 60,031	$8,169,642
July 7	Perth	Australia	Burswood Dome	Lady Starlight	32,046 / 32,046	$3,696,277
July 8	Perth	Australia	Burswood Dome	Lady Starlight	32,046 / 32,046	$3,696,277
August 14	Sofia	Bulgaria	Armeets Arena	The Darkness; Lady Starlight	8,705 / 8,705	$489,708
August 16	Bucharest	Romania	Piața Constituției	The Darkness; Lady Starlight	22,602 / 22,602	$627,303
August 18	Vienna	Austria	Wiener Stadthalle	The Darkness; Lady Starlight	13,826 / 13,826	$1,213,814
August 21	Vilnius	Lithuania	Vingio Parko Estrada	The Darkness; Lady Starlight	14,853 / 14,853	$1,004,182
August 23	Riga	Latvia	Mežaparka Lielā Estrāde	The Darkness; Lady Starlight	12,974 / 12,974	$587,997
August 25	Tallinn	Estonia	Tallinn Song Festival Grounds	The Darkness; Lady Starlight	16,191 / 16,191	$1,011,992
August 27	Helsinki	Finland	Hartwall Arena	The Darkness; Lady Starlight	19,793 / 19,793	$2,043,247
August 28	Helsinki	Finland	Hartwall Arena	The Darkness; Lady Starlight	19,793 / 19,793	$2,043,247
August 30	Stockholm	Sweden	Ericsson Globe	The Darkness; Lady Starlight	27,447 / 27,447	$2,848,530
August 31	Stockholm	Sweden	Ericsson Globe	The Darkness; Lady Starlight	27,447 / 27,447	$2,848,530
September 2	Copenhagen	Denmark	Parken Stadium	The Darkness; Lady Starlight	27,819 / 27,819	$2,223,471
September 4	Cologne	Germany	Lanxess Arena	The Darkness; Lady Starlight	25,123 / 25,123	$2,312,695
September 5	Cologne	Germany	Lanxess Arena	The Darkness; Lady Starlight	25,123 / 25,123	$2,312,695
September 8	London	England	Twickenham Stadium	The Darkness; Lady Starlight	101,250 / 101,250	$10,714,991
September 9	London	England	Twickenham Stadium	The Darkness; Lady Starlight	101,250 / 101,250	$10,714,991
September 11	Manchester	England	Manchester Arena	The Darkness; Lady Starlight	15,543 / 15,543	$1,795,795
September 15	Dublin	Ireland	Aviva Stadium	The Darkness; Lady Starlight	37,005 / 37,005	$3,523,340
September 17	Amsterdam	Netherlands	Ziggo Dome	The Darkness; Lady Starlight	26,375 / 26,375	$2,462,977
September 18	Amsterdam	Netherlands	Ziggo Dome	The Darkness; Lady Starlight	26,375 / 26,375	$2,462,977
September 20	Berlin	Germany	O_{2} World	The Darkness; Lady Starlight	11,968 / 11,968	$1,138,313
September 22	Saint-Denis	France	Stade de France	The Darkness; Lady Starlight	70,617 / 70,617	$6,367,305
September 24	Hanover	Germany	TUI Arena	The Darkness; Lady Starlight	10,816 / 10,816	$1,075,831
September 26	Zürich	Switzerland	Hallenstadion	The Darkness; Lady Starlight	26,626 / 26,626	$3,035,010
September 27	Zürich	Switzerland	Hallenstadion	The Darkness; Lady Starlight	26,626 / 26,626	$3,035,010
September 29	Antwerp	Belgium	Sportpaleis	The Darkness; Lady Starlight	33,539 / 33,539	$2,948,685
September 30	Antwerp	Belgium	Sportpaleis	The Darkness; Lady Starlight	33,539 / 33,539	$2,948,685
October 2	Assago (Note: Promoted as Milan)	Italy	Mediolanum Forum	The Darkness; Lady Starlight	10,753 / 10,753	$1,119,536
October 3	Nice	France	Palais Nikaïa	The Darkness; Lady Starlight	13,169 / 13,169	$1,088,012
October 4	Nice	France	Palais Nikaïa	The Darkness; Lady Starlight	13,169 / 13,169	$1,088,012
October 6	Barcelona	Spain	Palau Sant Jordi	The Darkness; Lady Starlight	16,934 / 16,934	$1,705,685
October 26	Mexico City	Mexico	Foro Sol	The Darkness; Lady Starlight	37,260 / 37,260	$2,666,769
October 30	San Juan	Puerto Rico	José Miguel Agrelot Coliseum	The Darkness; Lady Starlight	21,262 / 21,262	$2,242,937
October 31	San Juan	Puerto Rico	José Miguel Agrelot Coliseum	The Darkness; Lady Starlight	21,262 / 21,262	$2,242,937
November 3	San José	Costa Rica	Estadio Nacional de Costa Rica	The Darkness; Lady Starlight	29,014 / 29,014	$1,661,029
November 6	Bogotá	Colombia	Estadio El Campín	The Darkness; Lady Starlight	30,546 / 36,335	$2,465,994
November 9	Rio de Janeiro	Brazil	Parque dos Atletas	The Darkness; Lady Starlight	26,167 / 26,167	$2,218,846
November 11	São Paulo	Brazil	Estádio do Morumbi	The Darkness; Lady Starlight	43,137 / 43,137	$4,293,859
November 13	Porto Alegre	Brazil	FIERGS Parking Lot	The Darkness; Lady Starlight	9,918 / 9,918	$923,379
November 16	Buenos Aires	Argentina	Estadio River Plate	The Darkness; Lady Starlight	45,007 / 45,007	$3,988,565
November 20	Santiago	Chile	Estadio Nacional de Chile	The Darkness; Lady Starlight	42,416 / 42,416	$2,849,707
November 23	Lima	Peru	Estadio Universidad San Marcos	The Darkness; Lady Starlight	36,163 / 36,163	$1,732,732
November 26	Asunción	Paraguay	Jockey Club	The Darkness; Lady Starlight	26,481 / 26,481	$1,107,371
November 30	Johannesburg	South Africa	FNB Stadium	The Darkness; Lady Starlight	56,900 / 56,900	$3,270,764
December 3	Cape Town	South Africa	Cape Town Stadium	The Darkness; Lady Starlight	39,527 / 39,527	$2,285,389
December 6	Bærum (Note: Promoted as Oslo)	Norway	Telenor Arena	The Darkness; Lady Starlight	14,566 / 14,566	$1,748,812
December 9	Saint Petersburg	Russia	SKK Peterburgsky	The Darkness; Lady Starlight	11,127 / 11,127	$1,434,499
December 12	Moscow	Russia	Olimpiyskiy	The Darkness; Lady Starlight	19,522 / 19,522	$4,022,660

List of 2013 shows
Date	City	Country	Venue	Opening act	Attendance	Revenue
January 11	Vancouver	Canada	Rogers Arena	Madeon; Lady Starlight	30,054 / 30,054	$2,891,441
January 12	Vancouver	Canada	Rogers Arena	Madeon; Lady Starlight	30,054 / 30,054	$2,891,441
January 14	Tacoma	United States	Tacoma Dome	Madeon; Lady Starlight	14,185 / 14,185	$1,258,450
January 15	Portland	United States	Rose Garden	Madeon; Lady Starlight	8,853 / 8,853	$791,496
January 17	San Jose	United States	HP Pavilion	Madeon; Lady Starlight	11,465 / 11,465	$1,498,246
January 20	Los Angeles	United States	Staples Center	Madeon; Lady Starlight	24,412 / 24,412	$3,082,251
January 21	Los Angeles	United States	Staples Center	Madeon; Lady Starlight	24,412 / 24,412	$3,082,251
January 23	Phoenix	United States	US Airways Center	Madeon; Lady Starlight	—N/a	—N/a
January 25	Paradise (Note: Promoted as Las Vegas)	United States	MGM Grand Garden Arena	Madeon; Lady Starlight	—N/a	—N/a
January 26	Paradise	United States	MGM Grand Garden Arena	Madeon; Lady Starlight	—N/a	—N/a
January 29	Dallas	United States	American Airlines Center	Madeon; Lady Starlight	—N/a	—N/a
January 31	Houston	United States	Toyota Center	Madeon; Lady Starlight	—N/a	—N/a
February 2	St. Louis	United States	Scottrade Center	Madeon; Lady Starlight	—N/a	—N/a
February 4	Kansas City	United States	Sprint Center	Madeon; Lady Starlight	—N/a	—N/a
February 6	St. Paul	United States	Xcel Energy Center	Madeon; Lady Starlight	—N/a	—N/a
February 8	Toronto	Canada	Air Canada Centre	Madeon; Lady Starlight	24,874 / 24,874	$3,414,886
February 9	Toronto	Canada	Air Canada Centre	Madeon; Lady Starlight	24,874 / 24,874	$3,414,886
February 11	Montreal	Canada	Bell Centre	Madeon; Lady Starlight	—N/a	—N/a
Total					1,698,482 / 1,698,482	$174,586,690

== Cancelled shows ==
List of cancelled concerts
Date	City	Country	Venue	Reason
June 3, 2012	Jakarta	Indonesia	Gelora Bung Karno Stadium	Security measures
February 13, 2013	Chicago	United States	United Center	Hip injury
February 14, 2013	Chicago	United States	United Center	Hip injury
February 16, 2013	Auburn Hills (Note: Promoted as Detroit)	United States	The Palace of Auburn Hills	Hip injury
February 17, 2013	Hamilton	Canada	Copps Coliseum	Hip injury
February 19, 2013	Philadelphia	United States	Wells Fargo Center	Hip injury
February 20, 2013	Philadelphia	United States	Wells Fargo Center	Hip injury
February 22, 2013	New York City	United States	Madison Square Garden	Hip injury
February 23, 2013	New York City	United States	Madison Square Garden	Hip injury
February 25, 2013	Washington, D.C.	United States	Verizon Center	Hip injury
February 27, 2013	Boston	United States	TD Garden	Hip injury
March 2, 2013	State College (Note: Promoted as University Park)	United States	Bryce Jordan Center	Hip injury
March 3, 2013	Uncasville	United States	Mohegan Sun Arena	Hip injury
March 6, 2013	New York City (Note: Promoted as Brooklyn)	United States	Barclays Center	Hip injury
March 7, 2013	New York City	United States	Barclays Center	Hip injury
March 10, 2013	Nashville	United States	Bridgestone Arena	Hip injury
March 11, 2013	Atlanta	United States	Philips Arena	Hip injury
March 13, 2013	Tampa	United States	Tampa Bay Times Forum	Hip injury
March 15, 2013	Sunrise	United States	BB&T Center	Hip injury
March 16, 2013	Miami	United States	American Airlines Arena	Hip injury
March 18, 2013	Greensboro	United States	Greensboro Coliseum	Hip injury
March 20, 2013	Tulsa	United States	BOK Center	Hip injury

== Personnel ==
Credits adapted from the tour's official program.

=== Main ===
- Visual director – Richard Jackson
- Art director – Marla Weinhoff
- Production executive – Mo Morrison
- Stage architect – Mark Fisher
- Fashion director – Nicola Formichetti
- Costume design – Haus of Gaga, Christian Dada, Armani, Versace, Moschino, and Void of Course
- Creative – Haus of Gaga, Lady Gaga, Josh Thomas and Richard Jackson
- Choreographer – Richard Jackson
- Wardrobe – Perry Meek and Tony Villanueva
- Stylist – Brandon Maxwell
- Hair stylist – Frederic Aspiras
- Make up – Tara Savelo and Sara Nicole Tanno
- Video director – Steven Fatone
- Lighting director – Calvin Mosier
- Management – Troy Carter
- Stage director – Richard Jackson
- Stage fabrication – Tait Towers
- Promoter – Live Nation Global Touring
- Dancers – Amanda Balen, David Lei Brandt, Graham Breitenstein, Montana Efaw, Kevin Frey, Knicole Haggins, Asiel Hardison, Jeremy Hudson, Mark Kanemura, Ian McKenzie, Sloan-Taylor Rabinor, and Victor Rojas

=== Band ===
- Lady Gaga – Lead vocals, piano, keytar, guitar
- Lanar "Kern" Brantley – Bass, Band Leader
- George "Spanky" McCurdy – Drums
- Brockett Parsons – Keyboards
- Tim Stewart – Guitar
- Ricky Tillo – Guitar
- Joe Wilson – Musical director
