= Lady Starlight =

Musician

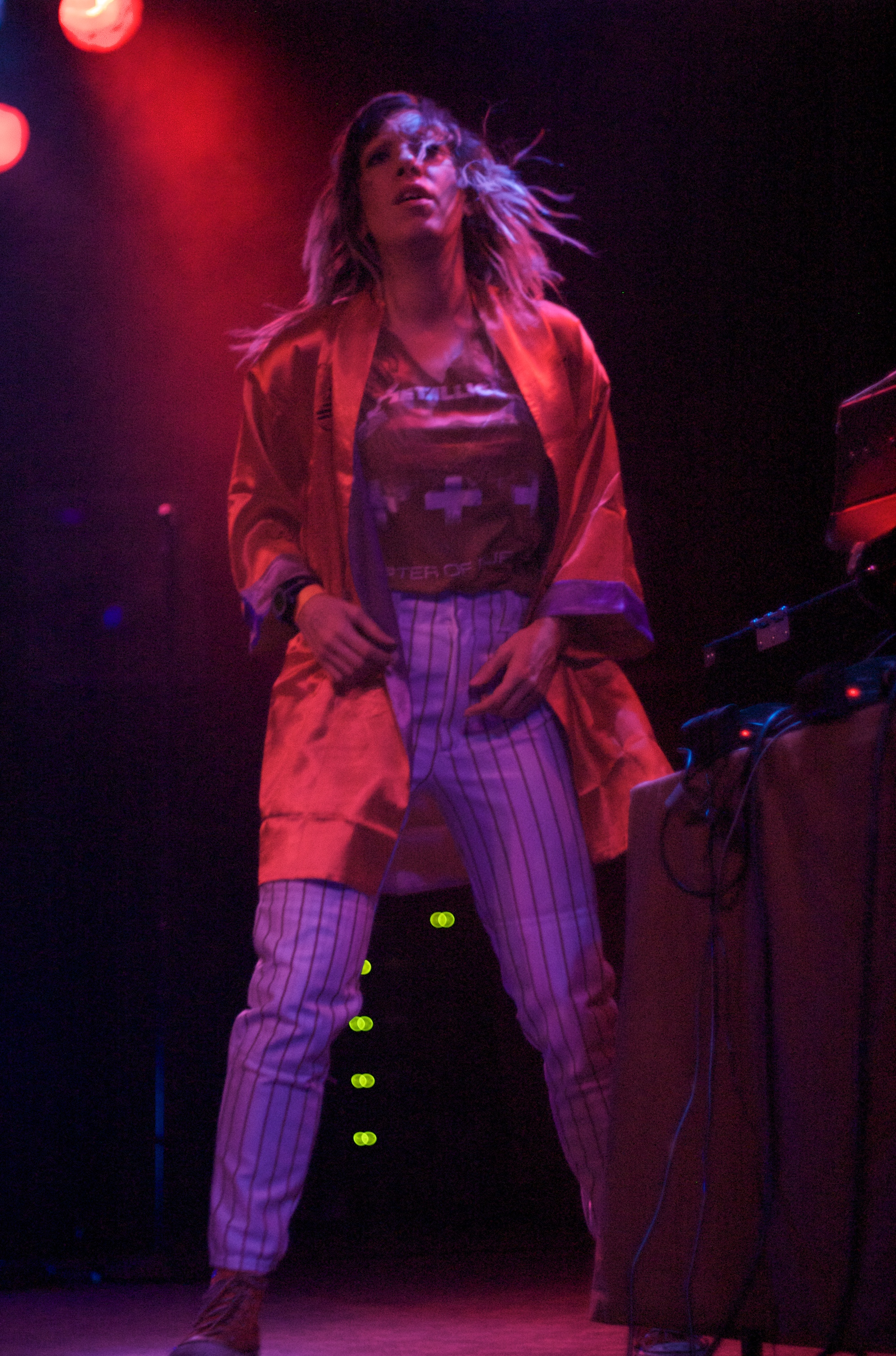
- Lady Starlight performing as an opening act of the Dirty Showbiz Tour in 2010

Background information
- Born: Colleen Martin; December 23, 1975 (age 50); New York, U.S.
- Genres: Techno; electronic
- Occupations: DJ; musical performer; go-go dancer
- Years active: 2007–present

Colleen Martin (born December 23, 1975), known professionally as Lady Starlight, is an American DJ and musical performer. Based in New York City's Lower East Side, she is best known for her numerous collaborations with Lady Gaga. Starlight released her debut extended play, Untitled, in 2017. The following year, she released her second extended play, Which One of Us Is Me?. Besides her own performances, she also sometimes performs with Surgeon (Anthony Child).

== Biography ==
Lady Starlight was born Colleen Martin on December 23, 1975, and was raised in upstate New York. She moved to New York City in 2001, at the age of 25.

== Relationship with Lady Gaga ==
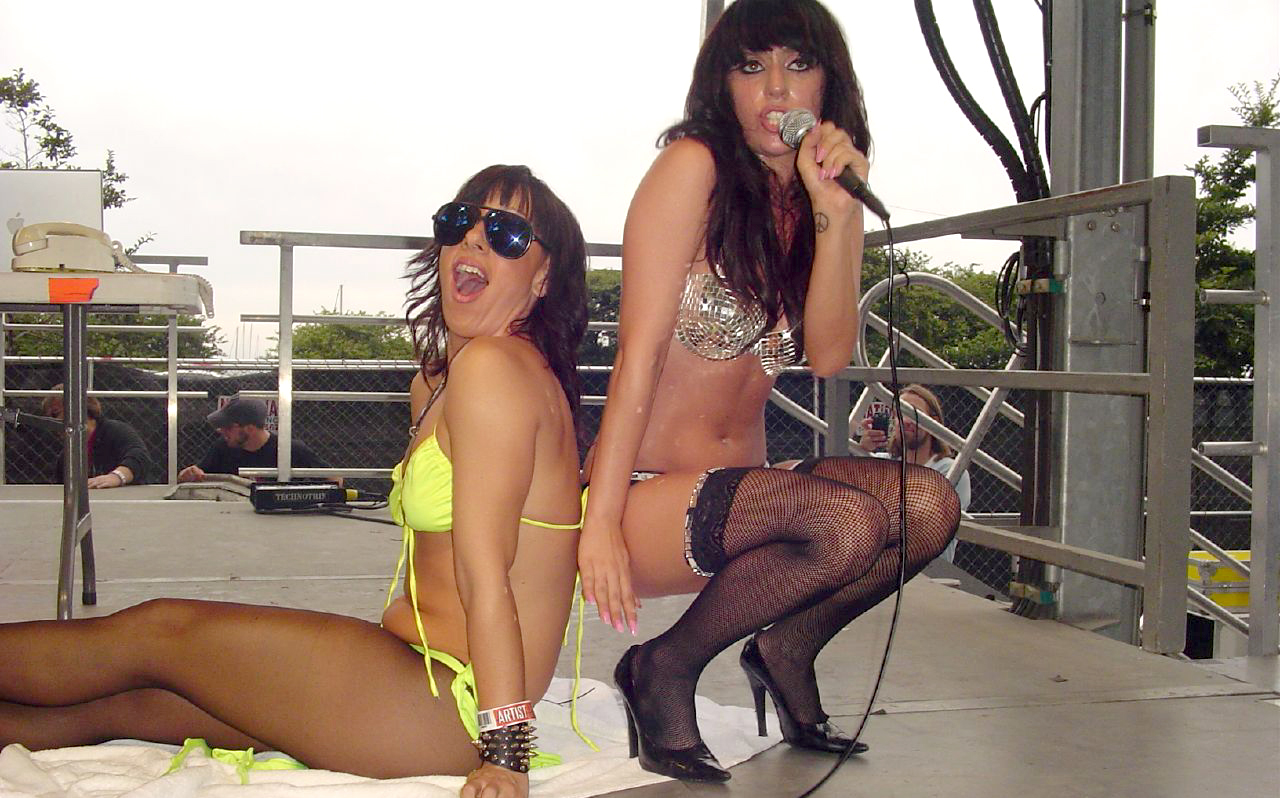
Lady Starlight (left) performing with Lady Gaga (right) at Lollapalooza 2007

Lady Starlight is best known in relation to Lady Gaga, having met the performer during a Manhattan party. The two became good friends and Starlight helped Gaga in making the "elaborate onstage costumes" for which she is now known. The two hosted a weekly party entitled New York Street Revival and Trash Dance, in which they performed songs from the 1970s and 1980s. Their "outrageous performances" included lighting hairspray cans on fire and go-go dancing. The two then performed in 2007 as Lady Gaga and the Starlight Revue, "a surprise hit", where Starlight played 1970s glam and metal records between Gaga's pop songs. The pair performed at the 2007 Lollapalooza music festival. Starlight has influenced Lady Gaga's career and her on-stage persona.

== Discography ==
- Operator (2014)
- Untitled (2017)
- Which One of Us Is Me? (2018)
- W (2019)
- 3 Days From May (2020)

== Concerts ==
Opening act

- Dirty Showbiz Tour (Semi Precious Weapons) (2010)
- The Monster Ball Tour (Lady Gaga) (2010–11)
- Epitaph World Tour (Judas Priest) (2011–12)
- Born This Way Ball (Lady Gaga) (2012–13)
- Lady Gaga Live at Roseland Ballroom (Lady Gaga) (2014)
- ArtRave: The Artpop Ball (Lady Gaga) (2014)
