= Americano (song) =

- Vinyl box set picture disc cover

Song by Lady Gaga

from the album Born This Way
- Released: May 23, 2011
- Recorded: August 2010
- Studio: Studio Bus (Europe); The Mix Room (Burbank)
- Genre: Mariachi; house; techno
- Length: 4:06
- Label: Streamline; Interscope; KonLive
- Songwriters: Stefani Germanotta; Fernando Garibay; Paul Blair; Brian Lee
- Producers: Lady Gaga; Fernando Garibay; DJ White Shadow

Audio video
- "Americano" on YouTube

"Americano" is a song recorded by American singer Lady Gaga, taken from her second studio album, Born This Way (2011). The song was written and produced by Gaga with DJ White Shadow, Fernando Garibay, and Brian Lee. "Americano" was influenced by the events surrounding the repeal of the controversial California Proposition 8—a ballot proposition that defined marriage as a union between opposite-sex couples, thereby prohibiting and invalidating same-sex marriage throughout the state—as well as the growing struggles of Mexican immigrants. It combines mariachi, house, and techno genres with elements from Latin music. Lyrically, the song talks about Lady Gaga's infatuation with a woman.

Critical response to "Americano" was mixed. The song charted at number 17 on the US Dance/Electronic Digital Songs and number 98 on the South Korean Gaon International Download Chart. Gaga debuted the song in Guadalajara, Mexico on May 3, 2011, during her Monster Ball Tour. It was later part of the setlist for her Born This Way Ball (2012–2013), where she wore an artificial replica of her "meat dress" for the song. In 2024, she performed a jazz version of "Americano" at her Jazz & Piano residency in Las Vegas. The track was also featured at the end of DreamWorks Animation's 2011 film, Puss in Boots.

== Writing and development ==
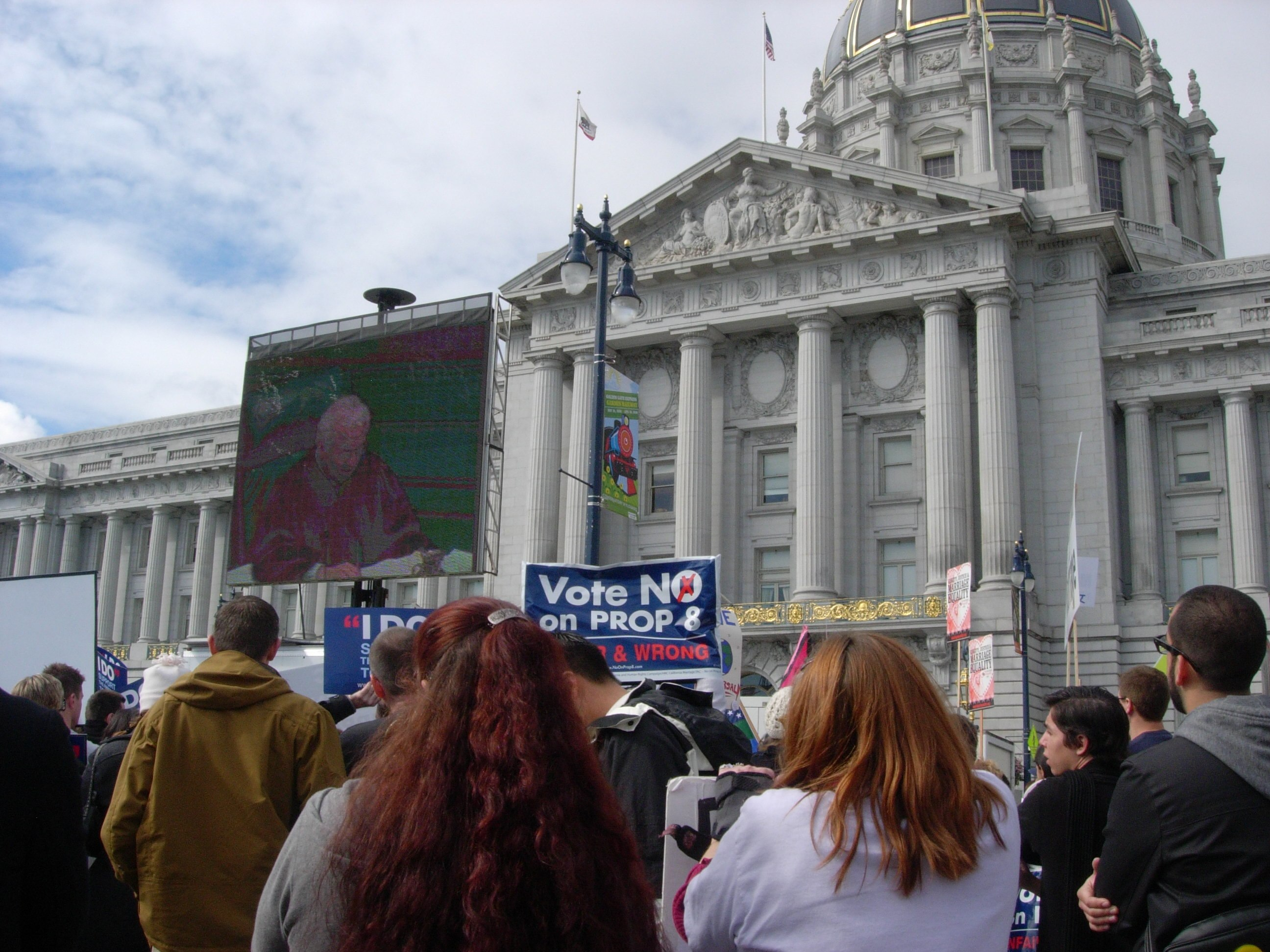
The California Proposition 8 was the inspiration behind the track.

While performing in Mexico as part of The Monster Ball Tour (2009–2011), Gaga announced the track "Americano" from Born This Way, her second studio album. "Americano" was influenced by the events surrounding the repeal of the controversial California Proposition 8, a California ballot proposition and a state constitutional amendment passed in the November 2008 California state elections. The proposition was created by opponents of same-sex marriage, thereby prohibiting and invalidating the marriages throughout the state. The proposition was also linked to the growing struggles of Mexican immigrants.

Gaga had previously experimented with Latin music on the track "Alejandro" from The Fame Monster (2009), but with "Americano" she took the musical composition to another direction. One of the producers of the track, Fernando Garibay, recalled that the inspiration came from the events that took place in August 2010, when Proposition 8 was overturned in California. Coupled with the immigration related troubles faced by Mexicans living in the United States, Gaga had the idea to put all the incidents as direct inspiration for the track. She had even messaged on her Twitter account about the ruling, noting that she wrote "Americano" around that time only. Garibay experimented with sounds on his guitar while Gaga played the piano, and they wrote the song.

== Recording and composition ==
French chanson singer Édith Piaf was an influence in the song's composition.

"Americano" was written and produced by Gaga with Garibay and DJ White Shadow. The song was the first collaboration between Gaga, Garibay and White Shadow. It is composed in the key of F harmonic minor with a free tempo of 72 beats per minute. Gaga's vocals range from the notes of E_{3} to D♭_{5} and the song follows a basic sequence of Fm–B♭m_{6}/C–C_{7} as its chord progression. "Americano" is a mariachi, house, and techno track, with elements of Latin music. Featuring instrumentation from flamenco guitar and castanet, the track has a "disco-ready" beat accompanied by horns and a classical violin and rave bass. The tune of "Mambo Italiano" is featured in the beginning of the song.

Lyrically it talks about the Prop 8 and the immigration laws, and sounds like a pop song comparable to the work of Judy Garland, with Gaga claiming that she sees influence from French chanson singer Édith Piaf. The singer wanted to "go big" with the composition including genres like mariachi as well as Latin percussions. She wanted to rebuke the claim in the music industry that Latin music was "a bit cheesy" and so the song took on a full Mexican form. The campy nature of the track had allusions to the disco version of "Don't Let Me Be Misunderstood" (1964) by Santa Esmeralda. The lyrics also have allusions to a lesbian-themed marriage in Mexico, with the pro-immigrant message told through a love story set in California.

== Reception ==
Adam White of The Independent described the track as "pulsating, frantic and genius – like a Mariachi band stuck in a tumble dryer." Jody Rosen from Rolling Stone found "Americano" hilarious, noting it as the "campiest song Gaga's recorded yet". She deciphered the location of the song's storyline as being in East Los Angeles. In Rolling Stone's 2011 ranking of Gaga's music catalog, "Americano" was listed at number 18, with the description as "The greatest Anglo-Latina lesbian marriage story ever set to a disco-cabaret beat". Ian White from BBC Music found essences of musical theatre in the futuristic composition of "Americano". Kristen S. Hé of Vulture regarded "Americano" as "an initially dizzying listen, though there's a tenderness in the eye of the storm." Robert Copsey of Digital Spy felt "it might be over the top, but given that it sounds like she was dancing around the studio in her finest Flamenco dress while recording it, it's near-impossible not to be drawn in."

Some reviewers drew comparisons to Gaga's earlier single, "Alejandro": Billboard's Keri Mason described the composition as an attempt to replicate that song's chart success, while Craig Jenkins of Prefixmag considered the "Latin-tinged" Born This Way track as inferior. Dan Martin of NME felt that "Americano" is "a Hispanic upgrade of 'Alejandro'", which "succeeds because it is so colourfully deranged." He further added that the overstylization of the composition worked in the song's favor, making it one of Gaga's best outputs. Drowned in Sound's Sean Adams also found it over-the-top, and described the track as "the barmy 'Alejandro'-zooming-over-the cuckoo's-nest 'Americano' with its Borat-as-done-by-Baz-Lurhmann, Gogol Bordello plate-smashing romp, as well as that snarled 'ow-wuh'".

In a mixed response, Randall Roberts of Los Angeles Times felt "Americano" is "sweet and sharply composed, but the Latin flairs are so stereotypical — the flamenco guitar strum and the mariachi horns (at least what you can hear of them) that it borders on self-parody." Evan Sawdey of PopMatters called it an "ode to European one night stands", which "falls into the fatal pop song pit trap of failing to make the chorus and verses sound different enough from each other to make any real impact, leaving it feeling very, very one-note, despite the flurry of acoustic guitars that weave in and out of it." Consequence Of Sound's Alex Young found it "an ill-advised dip into mariachi-pop" that ultimately shifts into "the same sort of busy Eurodisco club banger that, regrettably, makes up most of the album."

"Americano" debuted and peaked at 17 on the Billboard Dance/Electronic Digital Songs on the week ending on June 11, 2011. The song stayed on the chart for five weeks. On the South Korean Gaon International Downloads chart, "Americano" debuted at number 98—the week Born This Way was released there—with sales of 4,434 copies.

== Live performances and media usage ==
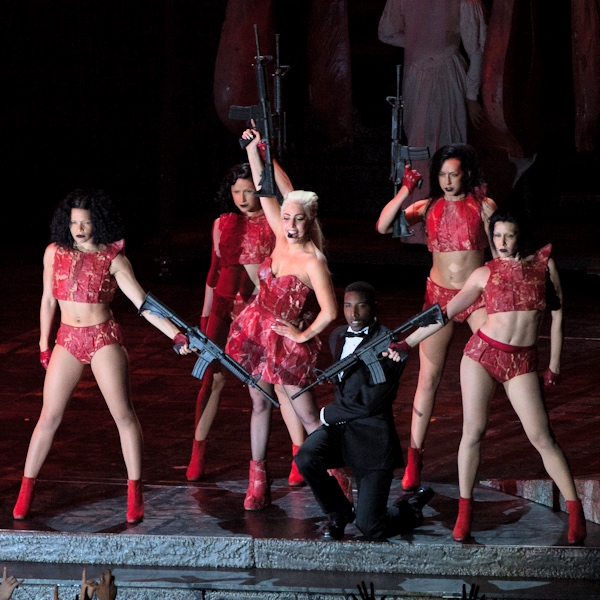
Gaga and her dancers during the performance of "Americano" on the Born This Way Ball tour, wearing artificial recreations of Gaga's "meat dress"

Gaga debuted the song in Guadalajara, Mexico on May 3, 2011, during The Monster Ball Tour, where she performed it in an acoustic version. She later included "Americano" on the set list of her Born This Way Ball tour (2012–2013). During the performance the singer wore a modified version of her famous meat dress and sang the song while faux meat carcasses hung around her. Gaga was surrounded by her dancers who were semi-nude onstage. The sequence portrayed a wedding with an extended Spanish guitar intro and Gaga appearing on the meat counter as the bride in the meat dress. It ends with the singer shooting her husband onstage. After finishing the song, Gaga told the audience "In 1970, women would no longer be treated like meat. On the cover of Hustler magazine or at the Born This Way Ball, meat is precisely how we treat them."

In 2024, Gaga sang a jazz version of "Americano" at her Jazz & Piano residency in Las Vegas, while wearing a crimson dress. Reviewing one of Gaga's concerts from the residency, Las Vegas Weekly's Shannon Miller remarked, "what really got us out of our seats was her performance of 'Americano', which the singer hasn’t performed in public in more than 10 years."

American television series, Glee, covered the song in the episode "The New Rachel". Sung by Kate Hudson, it was used a mashup with Jennifer Lopez's song "Dance Again". The sequence showed Hudson as a dance teacher, showing choreographed moves to the mash-up. The mash-up was also released as a single to the iTunes Store. In 2011, "Americano" was used in the trailer as well as the end credits scenes of the animated film, Puss in Boots.

== Credits and personnel ==
Credits adapted from the liner notes of Born This Way.

- Lady Gaga – vocals, songwriter, producer, background vocals
- Fernando Garibay – songwriter, producer, background vocals, programming, instrumentation and arrangement, guitar, keyboards
- DJ White Shadow – songwriter, producer, programming
- Cheche Alara – songwriter, instrumentation and arrangement
- Mario Hernandez – guitarrón & vihuela
- Stephanie Amaro – guitar
- Andy Abad – requinto
- Suemy Gonzalez & Julio Hernandez – violin
- Harry Kim – trumpet
- Jorge Alvarez – additional background vocals
- David Gomez – additional background vocals
- Carlos Murguia – additional background vocals
- Dave Russell – recording on Studio Bus; audio mixing at The Mix Room, Burbank, California
- Rafa Sardinia – additional recording at The Mix Room, Burbank, California; additional mixing
- Gene Grimaldi – audio mastering at Oasis Mastering, Burbank, California
- Paul Pavao – assistant

== Charts ==
Weekly chart performance for "Americano"
Chart (2011)	Peak position
South Korea International Tracks (GAON)	98
US Dance/Electronic Digital Songs (Billboard)	17
