= Franc Fernandez =

Argentine artist

- Born: Francisco C. Fernandez; April 12, 1986 (age 40); Argentina
- Occupations: Artist; Fashion Designer; Graphic Designer; Stylist; Creative Director
- Website: www.francfernandez.com

Franc Fernandez, full name Francisco C. Fernandez, is an Argentinian artist, fashion designer, and creative director based in Los Angeles and New York. His most well-known work is his meat dress design for Lady Gaga, but has also worked with several different artists.

== Early life and education ==
Fernandez was born on April 12, 1986, and "grew up in a close-knit Argentine household." He was born in Argentina and lived there until moving to Sylmar in San Fernando Valley in Los Angeles at age eight. In early high school, Fernandez began to go by "Franc" to increase his chances of getting a job. During high school he attended ArtCenter College of Design for graphic design, but dropped out. He also attended architecture and art school, but dropped out of both as well. He stated that he did not finish school as he "would get bored." Despite designing clothes, Fernandez did not ever go to fashion school.

== Career ==
Fernandez first started experimenting with clothing in high school, combining shirts and sweaters and stitching their labels on the outside. He states that the mix of graphic design and architecture led to his "flavor of millinery." He apprenticed for a milliner in London to learn basic techniques of hat making. Says Fernandez, "For the most part I’m self-trained. I’m not very good in institutions. I can sort of weed out what I like/dislike, need/not need." He was interested in Mustache Mondays, an LGBTQ night club where people would make their entire outfit to go to, and began wearing engineered models on his head there. His hats garnered him attention, and he began to receive requests from stylists for custom pieces. Fernandez's work ethic is "to just go with the flow."

Along with his hats, Fernandez also worked for the main promotor of Mustache Mondays, Ignacio "Nacho" Nava, Junior. He would make flyers for the club for $25 per flyer. Fernandez explains his process of making these flyers by "taking fashion magazines and cutting pieces out, scanning them, redoing and putting them on flyers." Afterwards, Nava would "send him all the artists that were playing" that night and have him copy and paste it on.

Once he started working with Nicola Formichetti, Fernandez's career began to take off. He stated that he "contacted Nicola a while back showing him" his work by email and was later contacted by Formichetti to work with him and Lady Gaga.

Fernandez has worked with many contemporary musical artists, some including Lady Gaga, Sam Sparro, Scissor Sisters and Beyoncé Knowles. He did the styling for Scissor Sisters' UK arena tour. He also directed the music video for Sam Sparro's "Pink Cloud", using influence from technology and the internet to produce a video best viewed on an iPhone, mimicking the device's scrolling and swiping motions.

In 2015, Fernandez collaborated with Chicago-based rapper Vic Mensa on Mensa's outfit for the 2015 MTV Video Music Awards. The t-shirt and jacket displayed a picture of Black Panther Movement member Assata Shakur, as well as statements about police brutality in the United States on the pants and jacket sleeves. This piece is among several that Fernandez and Mensa had collaborated on together including trousers that stated five names of black-women who died in prison in July 2015.

His work for Mensa at the VMAs, Video Music Awards, marked the 5-year anniversary of his meat dress for Lady Gaga. He stated that he's "interested in pop culture if it’s questioning or upsetting people or creating a problem for people to handle,” when working with Gaga and Mensa. “I think that’s really important. I feel like there’s a lack of that.”

In 2022, Fernandez now works as a creative director for Original Creative Agency LLC. He describes his job now as "referencing" as he compares his visions to images. If he can't find an image, he sketches them out.

=== Work with Lady Gaga ===
Fernandez has worked with Lady Gaga on several projects, including the design of the "diamond crown" outfit for her "Bad Romance" music video and the outfits she has worn to awards shows and on tour.

In 2010, he was approached by Gaga's stylist Nicola Formichetti about creating a meat purse for Gaga for the 2010 MTV Video Music Awards. Fernandez agreed and suggested they should make a dress and shoes out of cuts of raw beef to match. He went to his local butcher, Palermo Deli, in Granada Hills. He asked what the best cut of meat would be for such a project and the butcher told him matambre, also known as flank steak in English. Fernandez purchased about 40 pounds of the Argentinian beef and sprinkled salt on it to drain any leftover liquid. He and his collaborative assistant Lyndsea LaMarr made up the design as they went along, seeing which cuts would best fit which areas, as "there is not much plan [sic] you can do with such an organic material." The dress was built onto a corset and the entire process was "really clean" according to Fernandez. They used a strong nylon thread to sew the meat together. The dress took two days to complete and wasn't "much of a challenge" to Fernandez, but he did find it odd to sew meat. He also worked with Brandon Maxwell, one of Gaga's stylists, to sew the meat despite being vegan. Fernandez transported the dress around in a cooler. As the dress was never tried on, Gaga had to be later be stitched into the dress backstage.

Along with the dress, Gaga's beret, purse, and shoes were made out of meat. They didn't have much time to make everything, leading them to wrap her shoes in meat and butcher twine. Formichetti told Fernandez to "throw another piece of meat on top" to make the beret. Unlike the shoes and beret, the purse was decorated with jewels.

The reaction to the dress was mixed, earning ire from animal rights groups such as PETA, and attempts to analyze it from various media outlets. Fernandez stated "I wasn't surprised at the response. I think everyone involved knew the response that the meat dress was going to get. I think what I was more surprised and excited by was how much the internet and technology played a part in that. I got tons of hate-mail, love-mail, and "meat dress" was a top Twitter topic for three days straight." Fernandez was pleased with the reception of the dress, saying "I feel like I have a voice now as an artist and as a designer," and that it gave him a larger audience.

In 2020, Fernandez redid the meat dress for Lady Gaga to wear again for a video urging citizens to vote.
