= Meat dress of Lady Gaga =

Dress made of raw beef worn by Lady Gaga

- Gaga wearing the meat dress at the 2010 MTV Video Music Awards
- Designer: Franc Fernandez
- Year: 2010
- Material: Raw flank steak

On September 12, 2010, American singer Lady Gaga wore a dress to the 2010 MTV Video Music Awards made entirely out of raw beef. Designed by Franc Fernandez and styled by Nicola Formichetti, the dress was condemned by animal rights groups, while named by Time as the top fashion statement of 2010.

The press speculated on the originality of the idea, with comparisons made to similar images found in art and popular culture. As with her other dresses, it was archived but went on display in 2011 at the Rock and Roll Hall of Fame after being preserved by taxidermists as a type of jerky. Following this, the dress was then transferred to the Newseum in Washington, D.C.. As of 2019, the dress is displayed in Las Vegas at the Haus of Gaga museum inside the Park MGM casino. Gaga explained following the awards ceremony that the dress was a statement about one's need to fight for what one believes in and highlighted her opposition to the United States Armed Forces' "don't ask, don't tell" policy.

== Background ==
Gaga was the most nominated artist at 2010's Video Music Awards with a record thirteen nominations, including two nods for Video of the Year (the first female artist to achieve this feat). She arrived in an Alexander McQueen dress and armadillo shoes and changed into a Giorgio Armani number before donning her third and final outfit of the evening: a dress, hat, boots, and purse made of raw meat. Gaga wore the meat dress to accept her Video of the Year trophy for "Bad Romance"; as she accepted the award from presenter Cher, she joked, "I never thought I'd be asking Cher to hold my meat purse." Gaga continued to wear the dress after the awards show for press photos and an interview on The Ellen DeGeneres Show. Gaga explained her interpretation of the dress to DeGeneres, stating, "If we don't stand up for what we believe in and if we don't fight for our rights[,] pretty soon we're going to have as much rights as the meat on our bones." DeGeneres, who was vegan at the time, later wrote, "Now, I love Lady Gaga, but as someone who also loves animals it was really difficult for me to sit next to Lady Gaga while she was wearing that outfit, but it did make me ask myself, 'What's the difference between her outfit and an outfit made of leather?'"

== Design ==
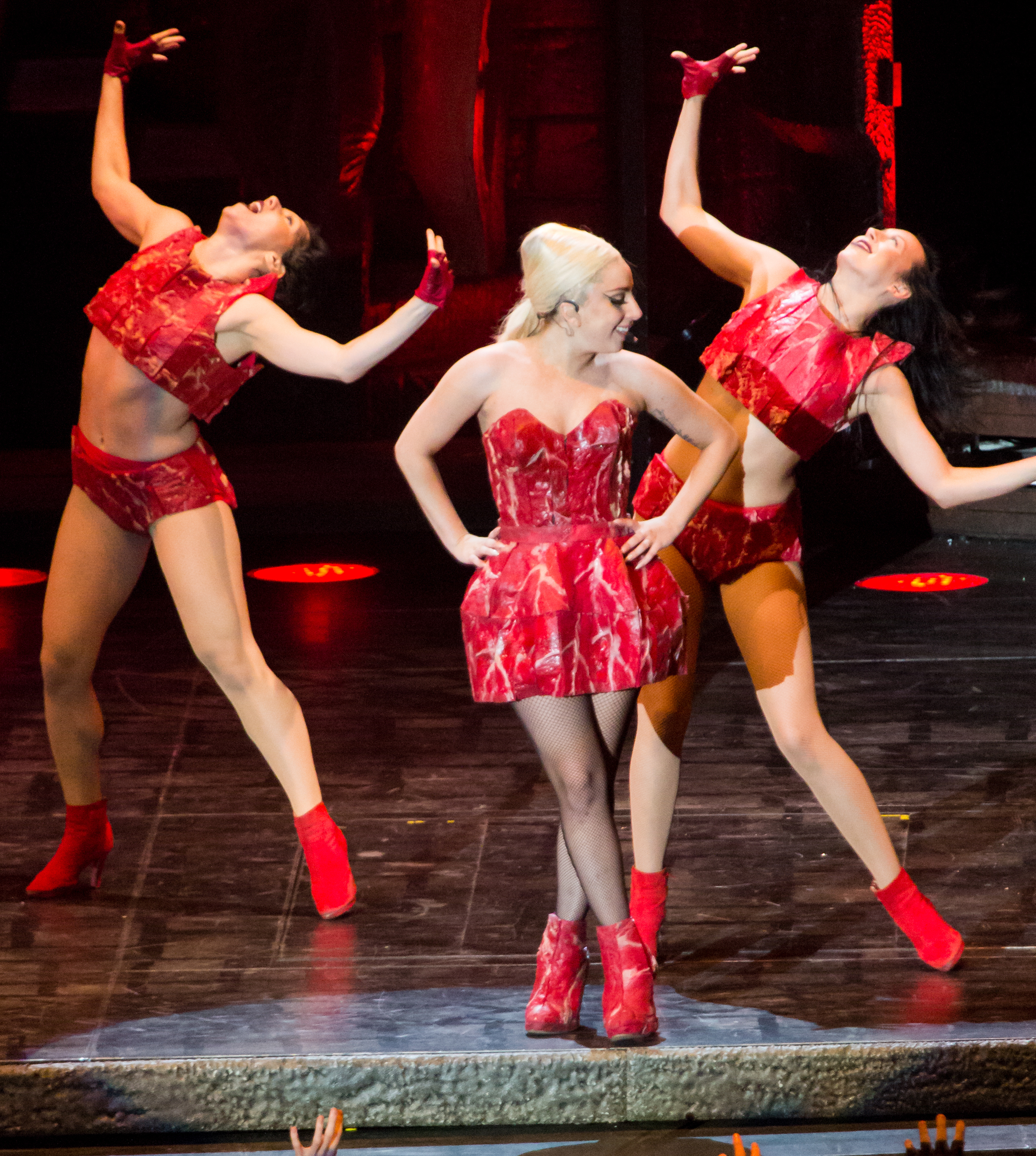
Gaga wearing a faux-meat dress during the Born This Way Ball tour, circa 2012

Fernandez was approached by fellow designer and stylist Formichetti to produce the dress, with it planned out over the course of a week, Formichetti having styled the look. The dress was asymmetrical, with a cowled neck. Fernandez specifically chose cuts to ensure that the dress kept well. Flank steak was chosen as the material to use, with the meat coming from his family butcher. The dress required Gaga to be stitched into the outfit backstage.

Fernandez said of his design, "I knew the dress would be one of other amazing pieces Gaga wore that night. It's very well made and looked great on her, on and off camera. We didn't get a chance to have a fitting. The only time she had it on was for the VMAs. Only when I saw it in the monitor did I know it would be big."

Fernandez reporting Gaga's opinion in an interview said that Gaga herself said it smelled good, because it smelled like meat. The designer talked of what was to happen to the dress after the awards show, "The dress will be put in an archive with all of her dresses. The Gaga Archives, I suppose. It won't last, that's the beauty of it. When it is brought out again, hopefully it will be in a retrospective, and it will be a different dress, which is the best thing. I like the idea of it changing and evolving into something else". He later explained that the dress would be preserved and made into a type of jerky before being archived.

The Rock and Roll Hall of Fame paid $6,000 to taxidermist Sergio Vigilato to preserve the dress. It had been frozen following the two television appearances, although Vigilato discovered signs of decomposition on the dress which had occurred prior to its being frozen, and noted it was emitting an odor once it was defrosted. It was treated with bleach, formaldehyde and detergent to kill any bacteria, and was reconditioned by being dyed dark red once it was preserved so to give it the same appearance as when first worn. However, after the preservation there were several pieces of beef left over and not included in the reworked dress.

Preceding Fernandez's creation, Gaga had worn a bikini made of meat on the front cover of the Japanese edition of Vogue. She later wore a faux-meat dress while performing the songs "Americano" and "Poker Face" during her Born This Way Ball concert tour (2012–2013).

== Reception ==
Following the VMAs, media outlets attempted to analyze the meaning of the dress with suggestions by BBC News ranging from anti-fashion, to feminism, aging and decay, and society's attitude towards meat. Chef Fergus Henderson explained this meat attitude as "People often don't want meat to look like meat. They want it to be neatly wrapped in plastic from a supermarket." People for the Ethical Treatment of Animals (PETA) condemned the dress, releasing a statement that said "wearing a dress made from cuts of dead cows is offensive enough to bring comment, but someone should whisper in her ear that more people are upset by butchery than are impressed by it." The Vegetarian Society also condemned the dress, releasing a statement that said "No matter how beautifully it is presented, flesh from a tortured animal is flesh from a tortured animal. Enough animals die for food and they should not be killed for stunts like this."

Some media sources proposed that the dress could be interpreted as anti-vegan. Vegetarian singer Morrissey stated that he felt the dress was acceptable as long as it was a social or political statement, and not just a "loony idea", pointing out that artist Linder Sterling had previously worn a meat dress in 1982 to protest against what she believed to be the perception of women by men. Ellen DeGeneres presented Gaga with a bikini made of vegetables when the singer appeared on her talk show, and the singer used the platform to respond to the controversy surrounding the dress saying, "... it has many interpretations. For me this evening, if we don't stand up for what we believe in and if we don't fight for our rights pretty soon, we're going to have as much rights as the meat on our own bones. And, I am not a piece of meat." She explained further that she was also using the dress to highlight her opposition to the United States Armed Forces' "don't ask, don't tell" policy.

=== Originality ===
Another controversy surrounding the dress was the question of its originality. Meat dresses have featured in art and music for decades prior to Lady Gaga's version. Karen Rosenberg from The New York Times compared the dress to a series of photographs of British artist Francis Bacon posing with sides of beef attached to his torso like wings in 1952, while The Daily Telegraph compared the dress to the original cover of The Beatles' 1966 album Yesterday and Today, conceptualized and photographed by British photographer Robert Whitaker.

An example of a garment made from meat stitched together in the same way as the Lady Gaga meat dress was worn at the Slade School of Art postgraduate degree exhibition opening in London, England, in July 1979, when British performance artist Robert Connolly wore a two-piece suit made of slices of salami. On 5 November 1982 British performance artist and photographer Linder performed with her band Ludus at The Haçienda nightclub in Manchester, England, wearing a bodice embellished with raw meat, as a protest at The Haçienda's showing of pornographic films.

The Daily Telegraph noted the similarity of Lady Gaga's meat dress to the cover of Northern Irish band The Undertones' 1983 compilation album All Wrapped Up, which showed a female model wearing a dress and gloves made of cuts of meat (mostly bacon) held in place with plastic wrap and accessorized with a sausage necklace. The photograph was taken in early 1983 as part of a B.A. degree in graphic design by British artist John Pretious. Some in the art and fashion press remarked on the dress's similarity to Vanitas: Flesh Dress for an Albino Anorectic, a meat dress made by Canadian sculptor Jana Sterbak in 1987 exhibited to considerable controversy at the National Gallery of Canada in 1991. In 2006 American architects Diller Scofidio + Renfro designed a meat dress for use in a beauty pageant.

Brooks Barnes of The New York Times claimed that Lady Gaga's dress was "derived" from Incarnation, a 2009 painting of a white-haired girl wearing a meat dress by American artist Mark Ryden. Sharon Clott of MTV also noted the similarity between Lady Gaga's dress and Ryden's painting. Ryden was reportedly upset that Gaga did not say she took inspiration from his work.

== Legacy ==
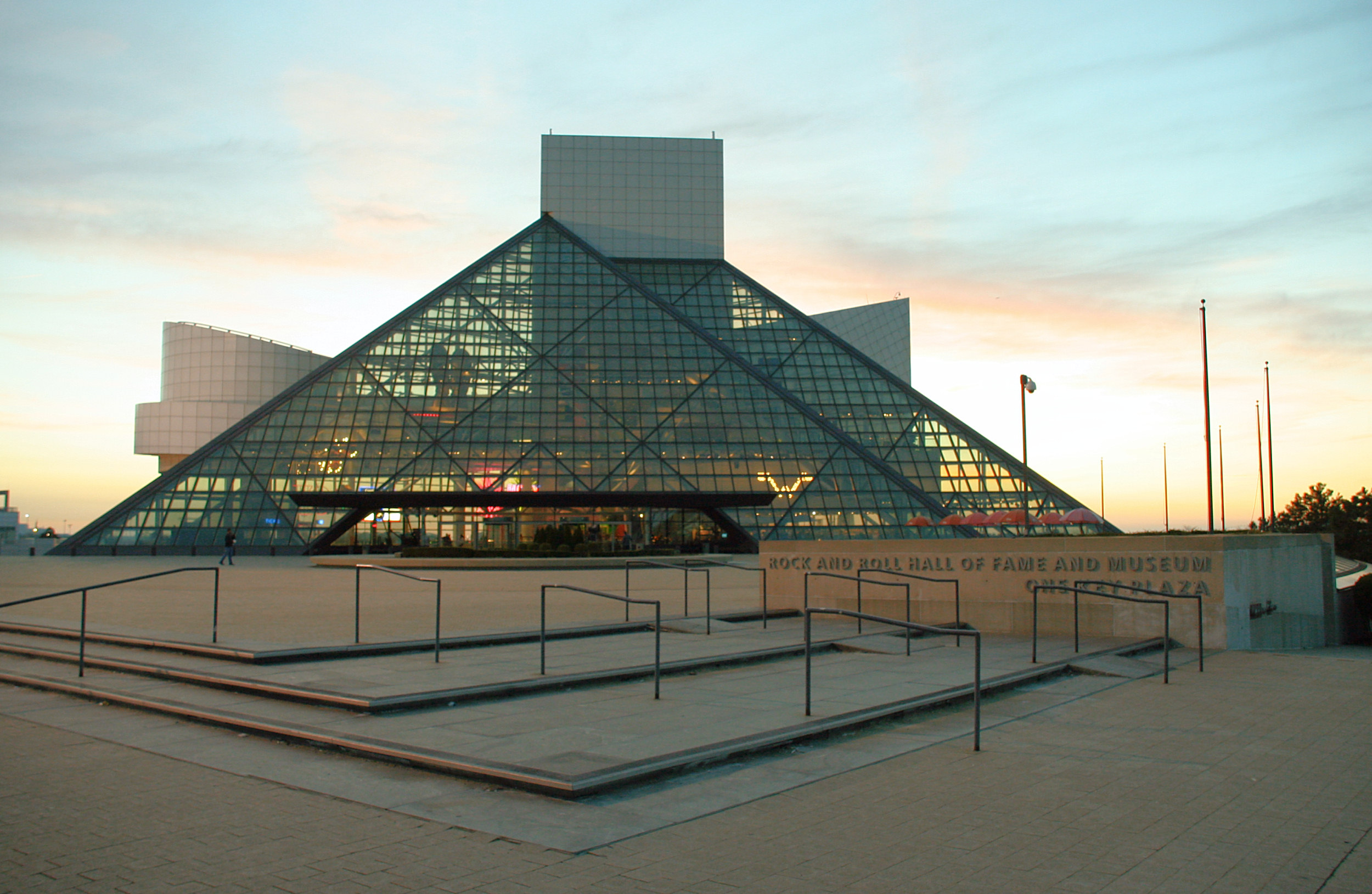
The Rock and Roll Hall of Fame, where the meat dress went on display in 2011

Although it was Gaga's third costume change at the 2010 MTV Video Music Awards, the meat dress was immediately described as the "most outrageous fashion moment" of the evening. A poll by website MyCelebrityFashion.co.uk placed the dress as the most iconic outfit of 2010, beating Catherine Middleton's engagement dress into second place. In summing up 2010 through a series of lists, Time voted the meat dress as its top fashion statement of 2010.

Fernandez credits the dress with an upturn in his career, saying, "I feel like I have a voice now as an artist and as a designer". He had previously created items for Gaga, including a costume for her music video for "Bad Romance". He went on to create a hat that Gaga wore to the 53rd Grammy Awards in February 2011.

The dress went on display at the Rock and Roll Hall of Fame and Museum in 2011 as part of an exhibition entitled "Women Who Rock: Vision, Passion, Power". Starting from 2019, the dress is presented to the public in Las Vegas at the Haus of Gaga museum inside the Park MGM casino, coinciding with Gaga's residency in the building.

When "Weird Al" Yankovic did a parody of Gaga's "Born This Way", titled "Perform This Way", he included a lyrical reference to the meat dress ("I strap prime rib to my feet / Cover myself with raw meat / I'll bet you've never seen a skirt steak worn this way") and had a dancer dressed in a similar outfit in the music video. Die Antwoord's 2012 music video for "Fatty Boom Boom" also parodied her dress. In the video, a Gaga look-alike in a meat dress is eaten by a lion on the street of Johannesburg.

== See also ==
- List of individual dresses
- Trashion
