= Nicola Formichetti =

Italian-Japanese fashion director and editor (born 1977)

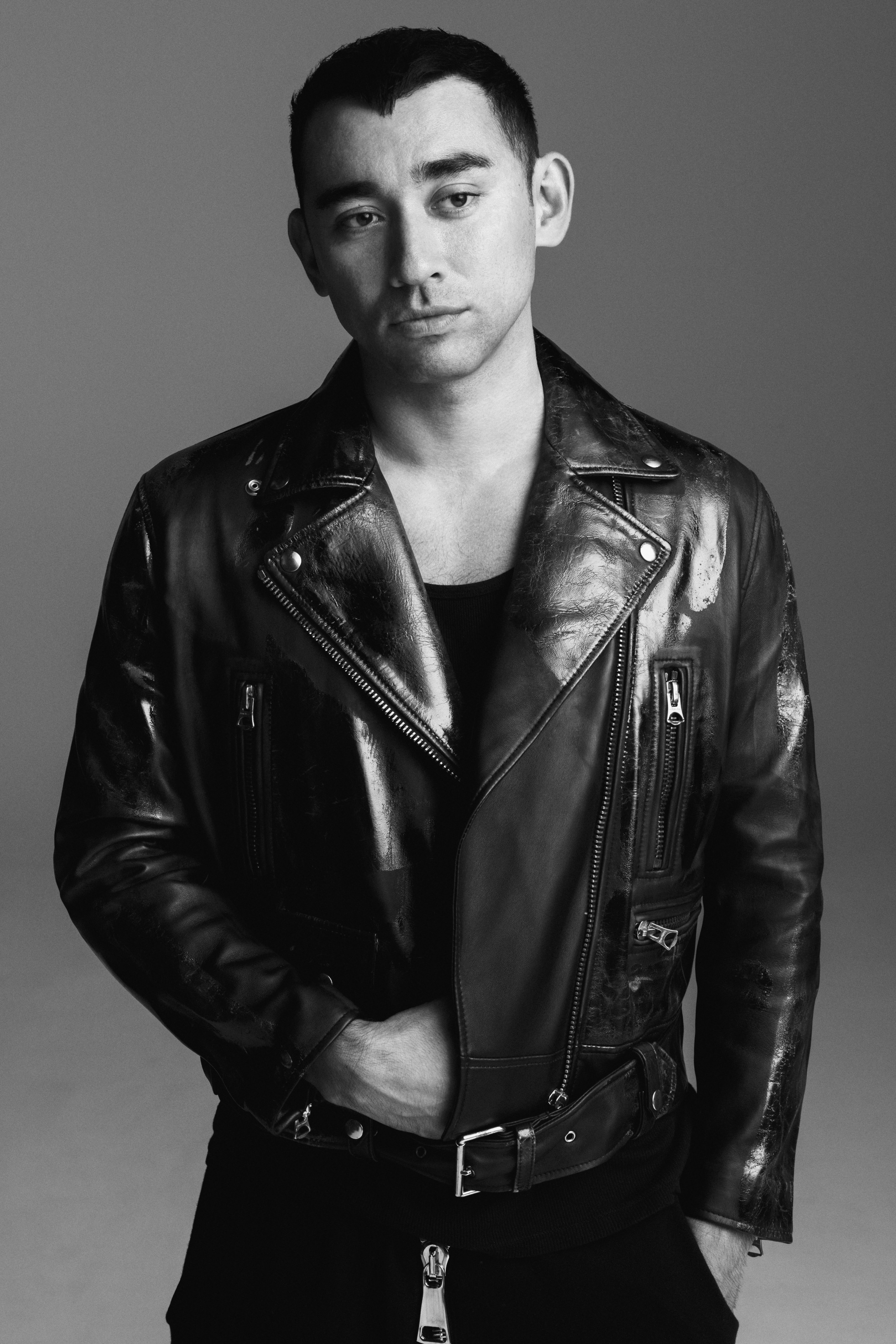
- Formichetti in 2020
- Born: 31 May 1977 (age 49); Tokyo, Japan
- Known for: Fashion direction, editing, design, creative direction, art direction
- Awards: 2010 Isabella Blow Award
- Website: www.nicolaformichetti.com

Nicola Formichetti (Italian pronunciation: [niˈkɔːla formiˈketti]; born 31 May 1977) is a fashion director and fashion editor. Born in Japan, he is most widely known as the artistic director of the Italian fashion label Diesel and for being a frequent collaborator with singer-songwriter Lady Gaga. He worked two years (September 2010 – April 2013) with the French fashion house Mugler as artistic director.

Formichetti is also known as fashion director of Vogue Hommes Japan, is a contributing editor of several other fashion magazines and is fashion director for the clothing company Uniqlo. In November 2010 he was named one of the "most influential creative forces working in fashion today". The following month he was awarded the Isabella Blow Award for Fashion Creator at the 2010 British Fashion Awards.

== Early life ==
The son of a Japanese stewardess and an Italian pilot, Formichetti was born in Japan and grew up in Rome and Tokyo, attempting to assimilate in both cultures. As a child he trained as a classical pianist (and still plays for relaxation). But moving to London became his great desire and he used the excuse of attending an architecture school to which he was accepted in order to get there. Formichetti has explained that instead of attending he "literally walked in the front door of the architecture school and then ran out of the back one to go clubbing for three years." He became a student of the nightlife and street fashions, and began working at a fashionable boutique called 'The Pineal Eye' where he would become art director and head buyer for two years. Formichetti is openly gay.

== Career ==
While working at 'The Pineal Eye' Formichetti was spotted by fashion editor Katy England and she offered him a monthly page at Dazed & Confused called "Eye Spy," and after being named the magazine's fashion director in 2005 would eventually be promoted to become its creative director 2008. His work at Dazed & Confused led to other fashion magazines, including V, Another Magazine, Arena Homme +, and Harper's Bazaar USA. Among fashion designers he has worked with Kim Jones, collaborating with him on his collections and shows, and has worked with fashion houses such as Dolce & Gabbana, Alexander McQueen, Gareth Pugh, Carri "Cassette Playa" Mundane, Prada, Missoni, Iceberg, and brands such as Nike, Umbro, Puma, Stüssy, Topman, H&M, and Edwin. Among fashion photographers Formichetti has worked with Nick Knight, Hedi Slimane, Terry Richardson, Steven Klein, and Oliviero Toscani, as well as others.

=== Lady Gaga ===
==== 2009–2012 ====
Formichetti is a prominent member of Lady Gaga's creative team, the Haus of Gaga. His collaboration with Lady Gaga as her stylist or fashion director began in early May 2009 at a shoot with photographer Sebastian Faena for the July 2009 issue of V Magazine (V60), Formichetti saying that "It was an instant love." This was soon followed by a cover shoot for V61 (September issue) with Mario Testino. The following June he was fashion director for her performance at the 2009 MuchMusic Video Awards, and following that for the majority of Lady Gaga's important performances and appearances in the second half of 2009, including at the 2009 MTV Video Music Awards in September, where she appeared in four dresses by Jean-Paul Gaultier and one by Alexander McQueen, then on Saturday Night Live in October, where she appeared in a metal orb structure designed by Nazir Mazhar, and later at the Royal Variety Performance in December, where she appeared in a latex dress, by Atsuko Kudo, designed to resemble those worn by Elizabeth I, for Gaga's introduction to her namesake Elizabeth II. In the fall she also appeared in the third volume of Vogue Hommes Japan, the editorial titled "Lady Gaga & Araki's Tokyo Love" shot by Nobuyoshi Araki, with fashion direction by Formichetti. Their first collaboration in a music video together, for "Bad Romance", directed by Francis Lawrence, would later be voted Video of the Year and then win the Grammy Award for Best Short Form Music Video. In this Gaga appears in several outfits and footwear by Alexander McQueen, reappears in the orb by Nazir Mazhar, as well as in a "diamond crown" outfit by Franc Fernandez, and one by her creative team—the Haus of Gaga—among other pieces. Formichetti is also credited as stylist for her album The Fame Monster (shot by Hedi Slimane), and has been fashion director for her sold-out The Monster Ball Tour.

==== 2010 ====
In late January 2010 Formichetti was stylist/fashion director for Lady Gaga's music video for her song "Telephone", directed by Jonas Åkerlund, which was released in March. Immediately after this video was filmed came her appearance at the 52nd Grammy Awards (where Gaga performed with Elton John), for which Formichetti was also fashion director. In February he was fashion director again for her appearance at the 2010 BRIT Awards, where she dedicated her performance to their friend Alexander McQueen, who had committed suicide only five days earlier. Following their collaboration for several more appearances and performances over the next months came Formichetti's styling for her video for "Alejandro", directed by his collaborator in the past Steven Klein, and for the associated cover shoot by Terry Richardson for the mid-July issue of Rolling Stone. Her American Idol performance of "Alejandro" in early May was also styled by Formichetti. Among other projects, next came the styling for Richardson's shoot of Gaga (in a meat bikini) and Nick Knight's shoot of model Jo Calderone (Gaga in "drag") for the fifth volume of Vogue Hommes Japan. Around the same time Richardson shot Gaga as styled by Formichetti for the company Supreme NYC, but the shoot would wait until 2011 to be released both in the Supreme ad campaign and in the French magazine Purple. Knight then photographed her again, styled by Formichetti, for the upcoming September issue of Vanity Fair. In August the three would appear yet again in collaboration for the 30th birthday issue of the magazine i-D (the shoot itself actually dating from 2009), Formichetti also giving a short interview for the Gaga piece following hers. Then in September came her celebrated appearance, for which he did the styling, at the 2010 MTV Video Music Awards, where she wore (among other outfits) the famous "meat dress" by Franc Fernandez. Also in September the Fall issue of V Magazine (V67) appeared on newsstands, with Gaga, styled by Formichetti and shot by Mario Testino, on the cover with Marc Jacobs.

At the end of 2010 she was named Best-Dressed of the Year by Vogue.

==== 2011 ====
After several months largely out of the spotlight (except on tour) Gaga returned in January 2011 to begin the serious promotion for her upcoming album Born This Way and Formichetti has been fashion director for the project. The music video for the title track "Born This Way" was directed later in January by Nick Knight, with Formichetti responsible for the styling. In February came her performance at the 53rd Grammy Awards where they collaborated with designer Hussein Chalayan on her appearance and performance. Gaga, interested in the concept of rebirth, sent Formichetti a picture of a human embryo, and he was first inspired to create, as he told her, "egg [shaped] shoes—like you were born that way, with eggs as feet." She took the idea further, resulting in the egg or "vessel" (designed by Chalayan) in which she was carried down the red carpet and later onto the stage, hatching out in a yolk-coloured latex outfit to perform her new single "Born This Way". She was wearing, as he tweeted, "Mugler by Nicola Formichetti." A "Born This Way"-associated shoot called "Alien Excess" done in January by photographer Mariano Vivanco for the Spring 2011 (March) issue of i-D features Gaga in a latex coat from the new Mugler menswear collection, with Formichetti responsible for the styling. A shot from the same session with Vivanco, but with different styling, also by Formichetti, appeared on the cover of Billboard in February.

He has also done Gaga's styling (shot by Nick Knight) for her as spokesperson for the MAC Viva Glam Campaign of the MAC AIDS Fund. A new project called "The Masterpiece" has been announced in which Formichetti will collaborate with her for MAC to create a "wearable piece of art" composed of the profile photos of fans who join the campaign.

==== 2012 ====
On 23 October 2012 in a Huffington Post interview, Formichetti was mentioned by fashion photographer Lope Navo: "I bumped into then-stylist Nicola Formicetti in B Bar in NYC randomly and he told me he saw the first cover I shot in Milan for Rodeo magazine of Seijo Imazaki. He said he loved it and we have been in touch ever since. He gave me so much advice about my work."

==== 2020 ====
Formichetti and Gaga's collaboration was revived in 2020, when he was fashion director in the production of Gaga's sixth studio album, Chromatica.

==== 2021 ====
In order to realize a series of photos as well as a fashion film, released on 6 April, he collaborated with Gaga and Nick Knight for a Dom Pérignon's commercial, titled "The Queendom".

=== Mugler ===
After months of rumors, in September 2010 Formichetti was announced as the new creative director for the Parisian fashion house founded by the celebrated designer Thierry Mugler (who has largely retired from the business), which he has renamed Mugler. He has said that it was in fact Lady Gaga who persuaded him to go for the job, when they were looking through pieces from the Mugler archive when shooting the video for "Telephone". At Mugler Formichetti oversees designers Sébastien Peigné for womenswear and Romain Kremer for menswear. Joël Palix, director general of the company, said "We were looking for a young talent who could really bring energy to the brand ... Nicola is a multicultural, techno-savvy expert involved in fashion, communication, image and entertainment. He and the appointed talented designers will represent a new direction for French fashion. Nicola Formichetti leaves MUGLER on April 2, 2013. " For the occasion, he also asked the k-pop artist G-Dragon to compose a theme for the fashion runway, entitled "I am Mugler".

==== Menswear ====
The menswear, a collaboration with Romain Kremer, of Formichetti's debut (Fall/Winter) collection "Anatomy of Change" premiered during the Men's Paris fashion week on 19 January 2011. This was accompanied by a video shot by Mariano Vivanco, featuring Formichetti's new muse, the full-body tattooed Canadian model Rick Genest, and by a remix by Lady Gaga, as musical director for the menswear project, of a new track ("Scheiße") from her upcoming album Born This Way. The clothes, worn by Rico Genest and other models on the runway, recall those by Mugler himself from earlier decades, in such ways as the use of the colours navy blue and bright orange, or "hyper-modern"-style jackets lacking lapels. The collection also features some not-so-conventional latex pieces such as biker jackets, gloves, and even latex trousers. On the overall vision, Cathy Horyn of The New York Times describes Formichetti creating a "mechanical man" in the tradition of Mugler's fantastical woman, yet Adam Tschorn of the Los Angeles Times found plenty of the pieces surprisingly wearable. Formichetti himself says on the collection "I want to say something that has the past and the future, but what is really important to me is the present." Returning to Rico Genest, it was his discovery by Formichetti and then Gaga's urging which actually resulted in the menswear show, something not originally planned. Genest's discovery also influenced the collection itself. The show was streamed live from Paris on the Internet.

Genest can be seen styled in Mugler by Formichetti and shot by Mariano Vivanco in the sixth volume of Vogue Hommes Japan, the editorial being titled "Hard To Be Passive". In the Spring/Summer 2011 issue of GQ Style (UK) Formichetti is interviewed on the future of the brand, with Genest (also interviewed) shot in Mugler by Karim Sadli for the editorial.

==== Womenswear ====
On 2 March the womenswear, a collaboration with Sébastien Peigné, premiered. Lady Gaga was again musical director, previewing the track "Government Hooker" from her upcoming album as well as including the already released title track "Born This Way" in the soundtrack. But this time she actually performed on the runway in person for Formichetti's show, modelling pieces from his collection, called "Anatomy of Change Femme—Mode Sans Frontiers." Additionally, Rick Genest from the menswear collection made a reappearance on the runway among the models. The reaction of critics to the clothes was generally similar to their reaction to the menswear two months previously. Formichetti offers a silhouette in the Mugler tradition, "minimally rendered" as described by Cathy Horyn, and with sculptured shoulders (for the appropriate pieces), Alex Fury of SHOWstudio.com describing them as "architectonic". For the show Formichetti employed Rein Vollenga to contribute sculptural elements to the silhouette, Atsuko Kudo skin-like items of torn-up latex, and Franc Fernandez for Gaga's two hats. She herself gave input for the collection, associated with her Born This Way projects and performances, but is not financially involved with Formichetti's MUGLER. As he says, "It's just friends helping each other... I think when you start talking about money, it stops the whole creative process for me."

Although there was worry it might, Gaga's appearance did not prevent Formichetti's audience from noticing the clothes, variously described as "shiny and sexy", and "taut and futuristic", or like the menswear "surprisingly wearable", in particular the jackets and dresses. He chose to go mainly with the colours black, white, electric/royal blue, and beige. The set he designed for the show was composed of clustered columns from which rose arches to form a structure resembling the long central interior of a Gothic cathedral, the nave and its flanking aisles, through which the models, Genest and finally Gaga strutted. While it was found by critics among Formichetti's audience who were physically present at the show that both the architecture and lighting made it difficult to properly see the collection, the performance was as much or more for the millions around the world watching it streamed live on the Internet, like the menswear collection, but this time on the brand's Facebook page, and featuring 45 minutes live behind-the-scenes preshow. In fact he believes the future of the brand is a digital one, Formichetti saying "I design digitally, I communicate digitally, and I live digitally, and I wanted to incorporate that into the brand." For him Gaga's performance fits in the "new Mugler world", a "fantasy world" fusion of high fashion and pop with an existence both real and digital.

=== Nicopanda ===
Nicola, along with his brother Andrea Formichetti, created the Nicopanda line based on the panda cartoon that looks like Nicola. The story behind the name, accordingly to Nicola, "my friends used to call me Nico Panda because I’m half Asian, I had this long beard back then; and was a little chubby, so I looked like a bear—an Asian bear. So people started calling me Nico Panda"

==== Nicola's New York ====
The nicopanda line was first introduced in September 2011 at Nicola's pop up shop in New York's Tribeca district. Along with the Gage/Clemenceau Architects, the space at 50 walker street was transformed into a mirrored prism that housed vintage Versace, MUGLER, Uniqlo, Nicopanda products like the zombiepanda rings, iPhone and iPad skins in collaboration with Gizmobies, and looks by the Haus of Gaga. Nicola worried that people wouldn't show up to the store,

Formichetti is worried, albeit irrationally, that no one will show up to shop. 'I hope people come,' he says. 'Tell your friends.'As encouragement, he’ll be helping out on the floor for the two weeks the pop-up is in operation and has made sure to include affordable trinkets among the mix of higher priced vintage floral Versace and fall pieces from Thierry Mugler.

While the pop-up was happening, Nicola made a competition for his fans on Twitter, where the winners were invited to the pop-up for a breakfast with Nicola and a preview of the new Uniqlo line he worked on, the Innovation Project. Fans drove from Ohio and flew in from Phoenix for this chance.

==== Nicopanda Lane Crawford ====
In May 2012, Nicola opened Nicopanda pop up stores at Lane Crawford in Beijing and Hong Kong.

==== Nicopanda Tokyo ====
After opening up pop-up stores in Hong Kong and Beijing, Nicola opened up more pop-ups in Tokyo in June 2012. There were pop-ups in LHP in the Harajuku district, in Opening Ceremony in the Shibuya district, and also a pop-up shop and gallery at the Isetan Shinjuku department store. It was in this pop-up gallery that the Amebapanda chetti design was first presented, along with the Nicopanda X Hello Kitty collaboration.

=== Villa Effe ===
In August 2012, Nicola and his brother Andrea opened up a "super complex" in Nicola's hometown of Numazu, Shizuoka, Japan. Villa Effe holds a wedding hall, a restaurant, a beauty salon and a shopping hall that includes displays of Haus of Gaga looks and the Nicopanda line.

=== Vogue Hommes Japan ===
Formichetti was fashion editor for Vogue Hommes Japan from its inception until fall 2012, when the magazine was folded and repackaged into GQ Style.

=== Uniqlo ===
As of January 2013, Formichetti remains as fashion director for Uniqlo.

=== MAC ===
In addition to his collaboration with Lady Gaga for the MAC Viva Glam campaign, Formichetti has styled Irina Lăzăreanu, shot by Miles Aldridge and co-styled by Dillon Turman, for MAC's Quite Cute collection.

== Philosophy and influence ==
In the fifth volume of Vogue Hommes Japan, Lady Gaga had the following to say about what she and Formichetti desire for the future of fashion:

Nicola and I always joke around saying we want to make these tee shirts that say "fuck fashion" on them because we love fashion so much but in another way we want to explode it, ruin it and recreate it, then ruin it again and recreate it because I don't want any status attached to fashion. I don't want any pretence attached to it because I want it to be something that my fans, and Nicola wants it to be something for his fans, something that everyone could have. Beautiful, tangible and something from the inside.

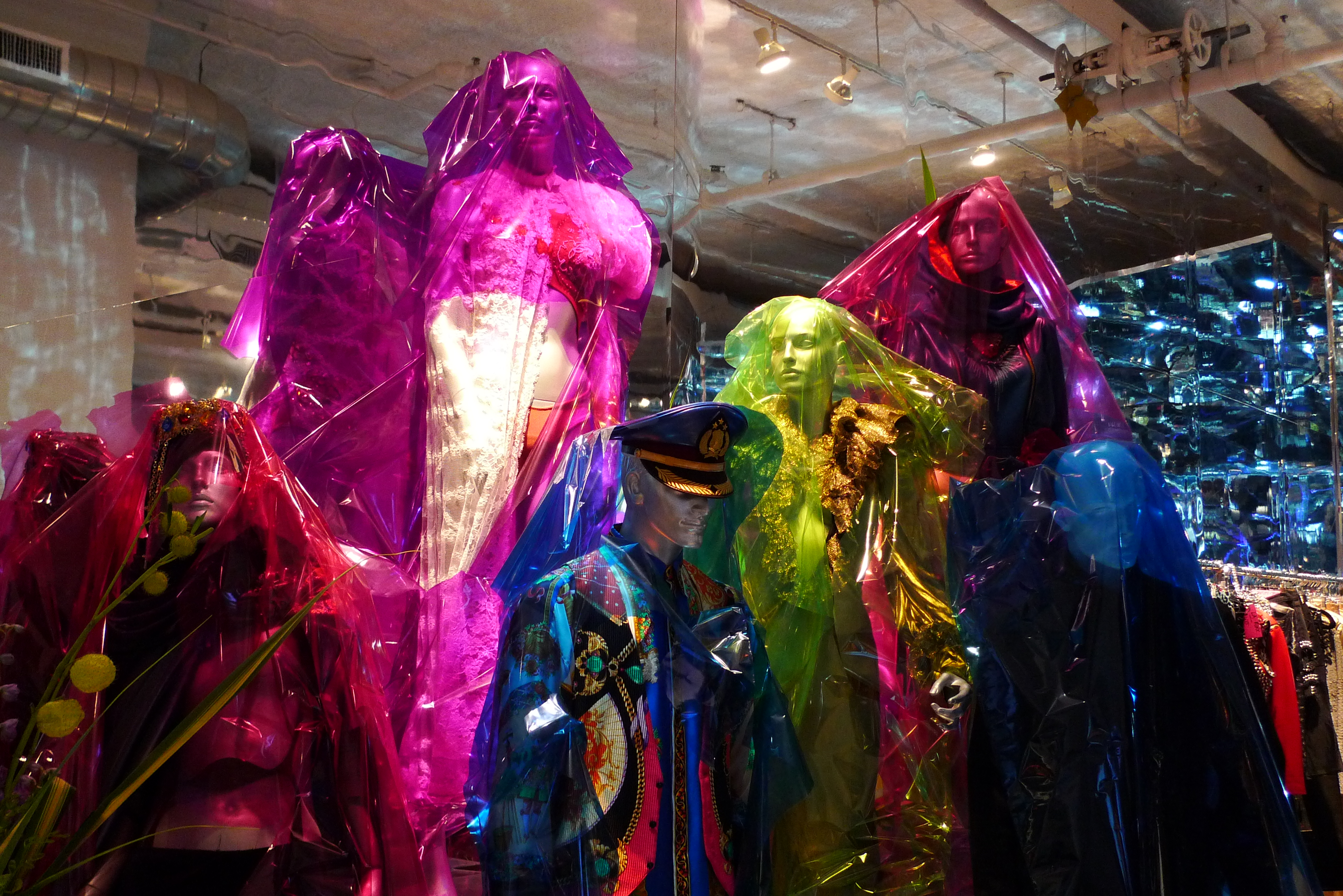
Inside Formichetti's pop-up shop, Tribeca, NYC, September 16, 2011

Formichetti has repeatedly declared he is "not an elitist" in fashion, instead wanting to share what he does with everyone, using the Internet for this purpose. Like Gaga, who has inspired him to do so, he also interacts with and is inspired by his followers, and usually works in collaboration with others. He sees himself not as a "stylist", which term he rejects, but rather as an art director "whose job it is to create moods, oversee an overall image." As he told Vice:

With the best styling in the world, a shit image is still shit. I love being in control of the whole thing—the design, the styling, the photography, and then getting it into a magazine and the marketing and trend forecasting.

His influence is varied. Before his Mugler collections premiered he was ranked the most influential stylist in the world (even if he dislikes the term), in no small part because of the enormous volume of his fashion magazine work, including making Vogue Hommes Japan "the most powerful Japanese-language publication in the global fashion industry", and because of his consulting for a number of fashion houses and other brands. It is with and through Lady Gaga as her fashion director, however, that Formichetti's influence on culture is greatest. Previously the role and influence of stylists was more limited, and while others have become designers, he is the first to take control of a major fashion house, interpreted as the most prominent example of a stylist becoming a power broker within the industry. Formichetti's eclectic selection for the avant-garde Gaga of pieces from designers ranging vastly from the great, such as Giorgio Armani, to the obscure, has influenced what has been described as a "cultural phenomenon" of imitation, extending even into "provincial backwaters".

He frequently meets with many younger talents who are interested in fashion today.

Formichetti practices Transcendental Meditation daily.
