= Vanitas: Flesh Dress for an Albino Anorectic =

Artwork created by Jana Sterbak

A photograph of Vanitas: Flesh Dress for an Albino Anorectic, which accompanied the display of the dress.

Vanitas: Flesh Dress for an Albino Anorectic (1987) is an artwork created by Canadian artist Jana Sterbak, first displayed at the Galerie René Blouin in Montreal. Its most famous showing was at the National Gallery of Canada in Ottawa, where it attracted national controversy. The work was composed of 50 pounds of raw flank steaks sewn together, and hung on a hanger. According to the artist, the work is a contrast between vanity and bodily decomposition. The artwork is in the collections of Walker Art Center in Minneapolis and of Centre Pompidou in Paris (edition of 2 + artist copy).

== Description ==
The artwork consists of a "Flesh Dress", constructed of slabs of beef sewn together, hung on a tailor's dummy. It is a one-piece, sleeveless, calf-length "house dress", with a jagged edge. The marble texture of steak and the thick fat are fully visible, displaying its expressive and bloody appearance. A photograph of a young woman posing in the dress appears on a nearby wall. The dress is stitched together from 50–60 pounds of raw flank steak and must be constructed anew each time it is shown. Initially, the steak is fresh and fiery red, and then it gradually turned beige and brown, changing its shape and size to conform to the dummy's hourglass shape. The work included either $260 or $300 worth of meat, as of its 1991 showing.

As suggested by the title, the work is considered within the genre of "vanitas", a category of art showing death and decay. The work includes non-traditional materials, a trend in 20th-century art. It "stands in the Surrealist tradition of the uncanny, of the informe, disturbing the distinctions, by which we categorize experience".

There were some earlier instances of meat being used as clothing in art. Seafood outfits, including a lobster bikini, were featured at Salvador Dalí's The Dream of Venus pavilion at the 1939 World's Fair. The cover of The Undertones' November 1983 compilation album, All Wrapped Up, showed a female model wearing cuts of meat held in place with plastic wrap. The clothes are mostly bacon, with a sausage necklace. In 2010, singer Lady Gaga attended an awards show wearing a meat dress similar to Sterbak's in style.

== Exhibition ==
Montreal gallery Galerie René Blouin exhibited the Flesh Dress in 1987. The exhibit received "scant" attention. The dress also appeared at Regina, Saskatchewan's Mackenzie Art Gallery in 1989, with the curator remembering minimal negative reaction. Regina Leader-Post called the work "disturbing," but justified in doing so, noting the "work should be seen – and experienced."

Cover of the National Gallery catalog.

At age 36, Sterbak was given a retrospective show at the National Gallery of Canada called "States of Being", reviewing the past decade of her works. Scheduled from 8 March to 21 May 1991, the exhibit included works like "Cone on Hand" (1979). The exhibit was relatively well-attended, compared to other shows, due in part to the controversy, and was discussed in the catalog Jana Sterbak: States of Being = corps à corps.

When the meat was shriveling, flaking, and falling off, one anonymous donor gave the gallery $260 for replacement meat. (This number was of some debate, with $350 worth of meat listed in one vegetarian magazine.) Because of the negative publicity the work had received, gallery staff pretended to be caterers when finding a butcher in the Ottawa area to provide replacement meat.

In 1993, the T. B. Walker Acquisition Fund purchased a copy of the work for the Walker Art Center, in Minnesota. It was reconstructed by a small team in 2011, for the show "Midnight Party".

The work was later exhibited at the Tate Modern in London, for the exhibition "Rites of Passage". When the small retrospective of her work was taken to Antoni Tàpies Foundation in Barcelona, the show was "edited down to an arid minimum" by the artist herself, which included editing out the dress. In 2011, the work was presented at "Tous Cannibales" at la Maison Rouge and in 2010 at Elles@Centre Pompidou, Paris Jana Sterbak / Couture sanglante.

== Controversy ==
The work was one in a series of controversies surrounding the National Gallery of Canada in the 1980s and 1990s, including the acquisition of Barnett Newman's Voice of Fire (1967), less than a year before. The show drew criticism from Members of Parliament, and the organizers of food banks and soup kitchens. It was considered an insult, given the early 1990s recession.

Progressive Conservative MP Felix Holtmann, a pig farmer from Manitoba commented: "I call it a jerky dress. There are a lot of people who hold food sacred in this land, and they are appalled by the use of food for this thing." In response, one newspaper editorial called him a "meat head". Holtmann was chair of the House of Commons Communications and Culture Committee, which oversees the NGC funding; the committee itself was split on the issue. The artist called Holtmann a "self-proclaimed Philistine [who is] not even successful as a hog farmer." Art critic Christopher Hume commented that the committee's concept "was based on the notion that the National Gallery is somehow accountable for poverty and hunger in Canada. Surely the irony of their desperate position is that they are members of the group that created the mess the country is now in."

Ottawa alderman Mark Maloney called health inspectors, who found that there the work presented no health hazards. Inspected on 1 April, Dr. Edward Ellis of the Ottawa-Carlton Health Department issued a statement that the dress presented "no health hazard to the public at this time", so long as no one touches or eats it. The inspector also suggested the dress was out of their jurisdiction, being on a federal property; the department asked Health and Welfare Canada to follow up.

The Toronto Sun and its sister paper, the Ottawa Sun, printed a cartoon featuring "a curvy, spaghetti-strapped slip" made of the same materials as the meat dress. The editorial cartoon suggested readers cut out the image, smear it with foodstuffs, and mail it to [show curator Diana] Nemiroff; her address was included with the image. The mailroom opened mail with gloves for weeks after the cartoon; one was covered in feces. A sexually-threatening letter was sent to the NGC communications officer, who had been quoted in articles about the work. The writer for Canadian Art suggested reaction would have been different if the genders of the artist and curator were different, that the work would have likely been deemed sexist, for starters. In all, 200 people mailed food scraps to the National Gallery of Canada within a week.

"If this had happened in the United States, it would have been great for me. By contrast my own little controversy is a sort of Canadian remake...The worst thing an artist is afraid of is indifference, so I haven't experienced that."

— Jana Sterbak

Contemporary Canadian art curator Diana Nemiroff suggested the controversy was largely due to the work being taken out of the larger context of the show. "There's no doubt that the dress is a provocative object and it's meant to be a provocative object, but the cry that it's a waste of food is misplaced." She noted that other exhibits have used grains, breads, and potatoes were used as part of previous exhibits, but the flesh was likely source of the controversy. Said Nemiroff: "It's kind of double cross because clothing is supposed to be second skin and cover us up. And this one reverses the process and reveals what we don't want to confront: our mortality."

The 1991 film The Silence of the Lambs, about a man who butchers women, was released around the same time, a coincidence noted by a writer for Canadian Art magazine.

In various critical reviews, the work of German Joseph Beuys was referenced; a 1996 work by Sterbak portrayed her as a moth, eating up the clothes in his closet. New York Times writer Ann Wilson Lloyd noted in 1998 that Sterbak's work "has inspired reams of humorless, abstruse theoretical writing that leaves none of her layered metaphors unturned. Yet Ms. Sterbak's work – seductive, intensely physical and edged with dark absurdity – delivers a mind-body frisson unknowable by intellect alone."

== See also ==
- List of individual dresses
- Meat dress of Lady Gaga
