= Gypsy (Lady Gaga song) =

Song by Lady Gaga

from the album Artpop
- Released: November 6, 2013
- Studio: Record Plant (Hollywood); CRC (Chicago)
- Genre: Europop; electropop
- Length: 4:09
- Label: Streamline; Interscope
- Songwriters: Lady Gaga; RedOne; Hugo Leclercq; Paul "DJ White Shadow" Blair
- Producers: Hugo Leclercq; Lady Gaga

Audio video
- "Gypsy" on YouTube

"Gypsy" is a song recorded by American singer Lady Gaga, for her third studio album Artpop (2013). It was written and produced by Gaga with French DJ Madeon, with additional writing credits from RedOne and Paul "DJ White Shadow" Blair. The song was developed with Madeon after Gaga's Born This Way Ball tour performance in France. "Gypsy" was described by Gaga as Artpop's most personal song; she elaborated that it was about travelling the world and the loneliness associated with it. A Europop and electropop song, "Gypsy" is a 1980s style "anthemic" track with piano and guitar instrumentation, and lyrically talks about Gaga's fans as being the people she feels closest to. The track was mistakenly assumed to be the third single from the album when Interscope Records listed it on their SoundCloud page reserved for future releases.

"Gypsy" received generally positive reviews from music critics who praised the composition, the simplicity of the production, the anthemic nature, as well as it being reminiscent of Gaga's own song, "The Edge of Glory". Gaga first performed the song during a listening party for Artpop in Berlin, while wearing a mustache. Subsequent performances happened at her ArtRave album release event, on the Saturday Night Live television show, the Lady Gaga and the Muppets Holiday Spectacular Thanksgiving special, as well as the encore on her 2014 ArtRave: The Artpop Ball world tour.

== Background and development ==
Development of Lady Gaga's third studio album, Artpop, began shortly after the release of her second one, Born This Way in 2011, and by the following year, the album's concepts were "beginning to flourish" as Gaga collaborated with producers Fernando Garibay and DJ White Shadow. As Gaga travelled the world for her Born This Way Ball tour, she also collaborated with producer RedOne, working remotely with each other. "We've been sending ideas. We couldn't get together in the studio, but we've been sending ideas back and forth, and it's very focused on writing really good songs and, of course, with the vibe of different sounds, different kinds of productions," RedOne clarified.

In the meantime, Gaga also worked with French DJ Madeon. This was his first experience collaborating face-to-face with a vocalist. He clarified with MTV News that he had "always wanted to work with pop artists and my #1 on my list was Lady Gaga. So when I had the opportunity to do that, I was really thrilled." Madeon was associated with co-writing and co-producing three songs on Artpop, "Venus", "Mary Jane Holland" and "Gypsy". In August 2013, during an interview with French radio station Fun Radio, Gaga revealed the title "Gypsy", saying that she had worked on the song with Madeon and co-written it with RedOne. Having mutual respect for each other's work, Gaga praised Madeon's production skills saying, "He is so amazing. He has such an understanding of music at such a young age. He reminds me of myself so much. He's obsessed, so obsessed with music." "Gypsy" was described as Artpop's most personal song, about travelling the world and the loneliness associated with it. The song showcases Gaga's fans as being the people with whom she feels at home.

In January 2014, Interscope Records had uploaded "Gypsy" to their SoundCloud account under the list of singles they would send for radio play. This led to media speculation that "Gypsy" would be released as the third single from Artpop, following "Do What U Want". Gaga also announced plans to film a new music video, which tied in with the single release rumors. In March 2014, however, "G.U.Y." was confirmed as the new single from Artpop, with its music video set to premiere on NBC on March 22.

== Recording and composition ==
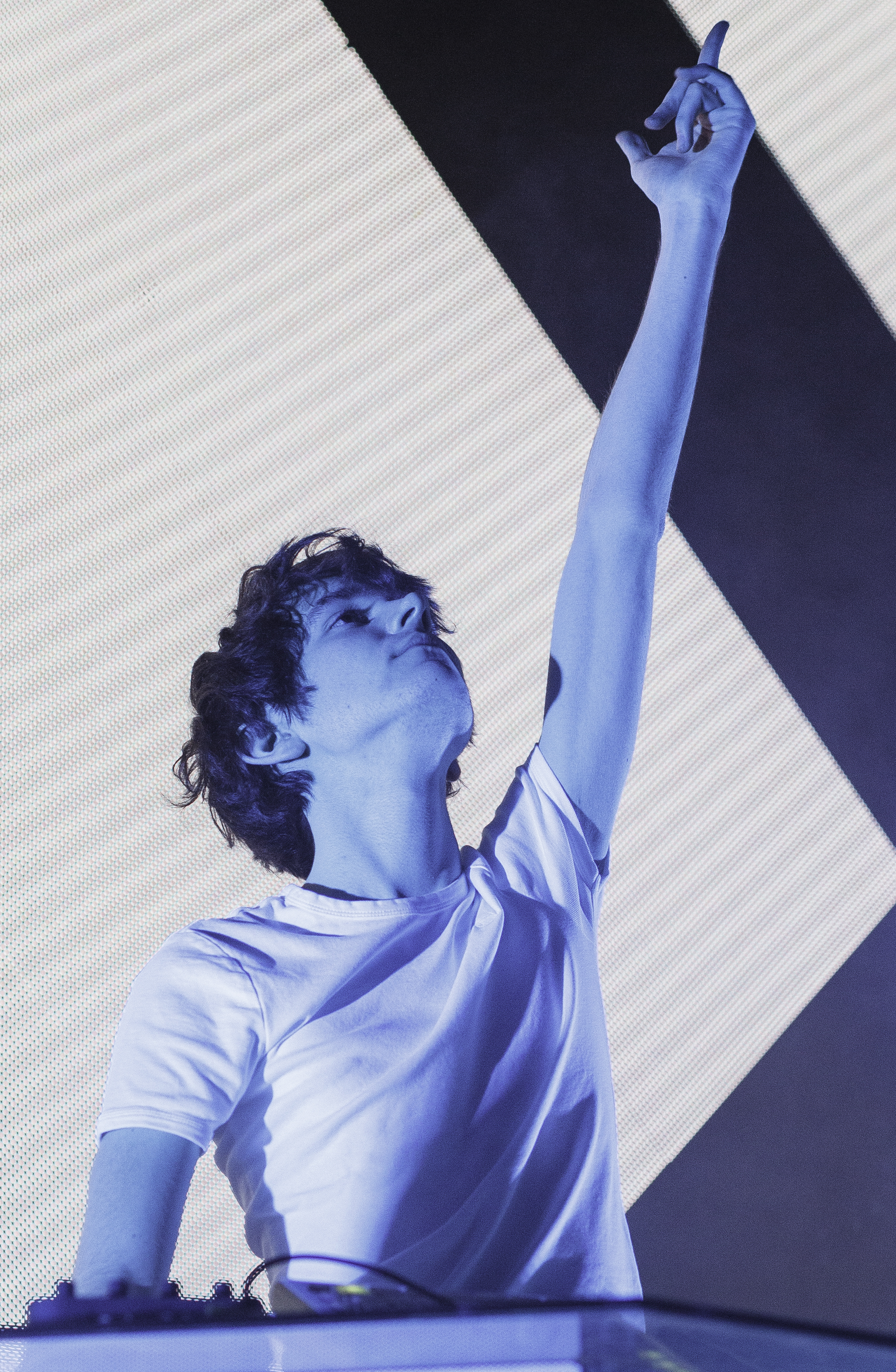
Madeon co-wrote the song with Gaga after visiting her at the Paris performance of the Born This Way Ball tour. He also co-produced the track with the singer.

Madeon recalled that Gaga would head straight to the recording studio after performing three-hour concerts on the Born This Way Ball tour, praising her dedication even when recording demos. Madeon's production on Artpop differs from his usual work. According Dylan Farella of Dancing Astronaut, the song "take[s] the mood of Artpop from ballad to anthem". On French radio Hit West, Madeon recalled that in September 2012 he had gone to see Gaga at her Born This Way Ball show at Paris' Stade de France. After the performance, Gaga took Madeon to her hotel room. He played her some chords he had been working on for sometime. Gaga immediately started singing the main melody of "Gypsy", and then the main song "flowed out", leading them to write a demo the same night. Since Madeon had brought his computer with him, he recorded the ideas developed with Gaga so he would not forget them. Afterwards, the song went through various changes, and more musicians were added for the final version on the album.

"Gypsy" was written and produced by Gaga and Madeon, with additional songwriting by RedOne and White Shadow. It was recorded by Dave Russell, Bill Malina, Ghazi Hourani and Benjamin Rice at the Record Plant Studios, with additional recording carried out by Malina at CRC Studio in Hollywood, California. Andrew Robertson and Daniel Zaidenstadt assisted Rice in the recording sessions, while Steve Faye assisted Malina. Gaga did the guitar and piano arrangements for the song alongside Tim Stewart, who worked on the acoustic guitars. Gaga also added the background vocals on "Gypsy" with Nicole and Natalie Ganther, and Lyon Gray. The song was mixed by Manny Marroquin at Larrabee North Studios; further mixing was done by Madeon at Popcultur Studio in France. Gene Grimaldi mastered the song at Oasis Mastering Studios, in Burbank, California.

"Gypsy" is a Europop and electropop song with classic rock and house influences. Adam Markovitz of Entertainment Weekly said "Gypsy" contains "barroom ivory-tickling" and a swooping hook. Rolling Stone described the song as an "eighties-style anthem." According to the sheet music published at Musicnotes.com, "Gypsy" is written in the key of C major and composed in the common time signature. The song moves at a tempo of 134 beats per minute, and Gaga's vocals span from G_{3} to D_{5}. The song's verses follow a chord progression of C−G−Fmaj7−Gsus−G, and the chorus follows with the progression G−Am−F−C (V−vi−IV−I). It begins with a soft piano sound and then changes into a high-energy electro song. The composition is in a sing-along style, with Gaga belting out "I don't want be alone forever, but I can be tonight" during the chorus, talking about navigating an unknown road based only on her instincts. The lyrics also talk about falling in love while being true to oneself, which was the initial inspiration for the track. She compares herself with "Dorothy on a yellow brick / Hope my ruby shoes get us there quick", referring to the fictional yellow brick road that Dorothy Gale followed in the 1939 film The Wizard of Oz. The line refers to the singer approaching a crossroad in her relationships, however she feels safe with her fans. Ericka Welch of The Huffington Post explained that "[even] with the looming sense of loss, Gaga can't be sad when she sees all the stamps on her passport and realizes that she has the whole world in front of her."

== Critical reception ==
"Gypsy" received generally positive reviews from music critics. Adam Markovitz of Entertainment Weekly considered the track one of Artpop's best, calling it "enjoyable". Caryn Ganz of Rolling Stone praised the song's simple lyrics, describing it as an: "Eighties-style anthem where Gaga admits her love of performing... [The track] works because [it wasn't] born from the chilly conceit that art and pop need an arranged marriage to get busy." Mike Diver of Clash said that "Gypsy", along with "Applause" and "Mary Jane Holland", were able to "tick all of the prerequisite Gaga boxes—dazzling production, a clutch of clever couplets, choruses you can demolish a tower block with." A positive review came from Bradley Stern of MuuMuse who wrote in detail:

"Gypsy" is the kind of arena anthem that already sounds like it's being belted in the middle of a sold-out Madison Square Garden. It's a slow and steady build, but once it reaches that Journey-esque chorus ("I don't want to be alone forever, but I can be... TONIGHT!", there's no going back. Cue the endless intercontinental shout-outs at the end ("I don't speak German, but I try!" — a cute nod to "Scheiße"), and you've got an instant classic from Artpop.

Sal Cinquemani of Slant Magazine compared "Gypsy" to stand-out tracks from Gaga's Born This Way, and found comparisons with the song "The Edge of Glory" from it. Cinquemani felt the track was much more effective in portraying the yearning of fame, than the lead single "Applause". Kevin Fallon of The Daily Beast compared it to the work of singer Bruce Springsteen, adding that the "power ballad is the kind destined for last-call sing-a-longs at those bars with peanut shells on the floor, with Gaga belting over tickling ivories about trusting instincts and charging into the unknown." Michael Cragg of The Guardian called "Gypsy" an "epic narrative about fame and loneliness" with the composition comparable to "The Edge of Glory" and a vocal riff similar to that of "Poker Face".

Chris Bosman of Time, thought that "Gypsy" serves as the "epic end-of-album track" along with "Dope", but criticized the songs for not being unique enough, saying that one song would have done "the job better than both." Similar thought was echoed by Andrew Barker from Variety who found that Artpop did not have any songs worthy of release as singles, and RedOne's contribution, "the 'Edge of Glory' sequel 'Gypsy', doesn't exactly scream 'crossover hit' either." The Varsity's Iris Robin found issues of "racism and cultural appropriation" in the track when Gaga claims to "love a gypsy life", since the historical and current oppression surrounding the Gypsies are well-known. For The Independent's Adam White, "Gypsy" was underwhelming, saying "it's very 'places 22nd at Eurovision'."

== Live performances ==
Gaga first performed "Gypsy" on a grand piano for guests at a listening party for Artpop in Berlin's Berghain nightclub. She said of the song: "I wrote this song as I was travelling around the world... They say 'a Gypsy doesn't have a home.' But I do have a home. I have a home with you always." Seated atop a piano wearing a bra and short blond hair, Gaga performed an acoustic version of the song, singing with a heavy German accent while sporting a moustache. Brenna Ehlrich of MTV noted that: "Throughout the performance, fans looked on with tears in their eyes, watching as Gaga unfurled the simple love story with nothing but her voice and piano." Malene Arpe, entertainment contributor to the Toronto Star, said her performance was goosebump-inducing and caused viewers to forget about the moustache "right in the middle of her face."

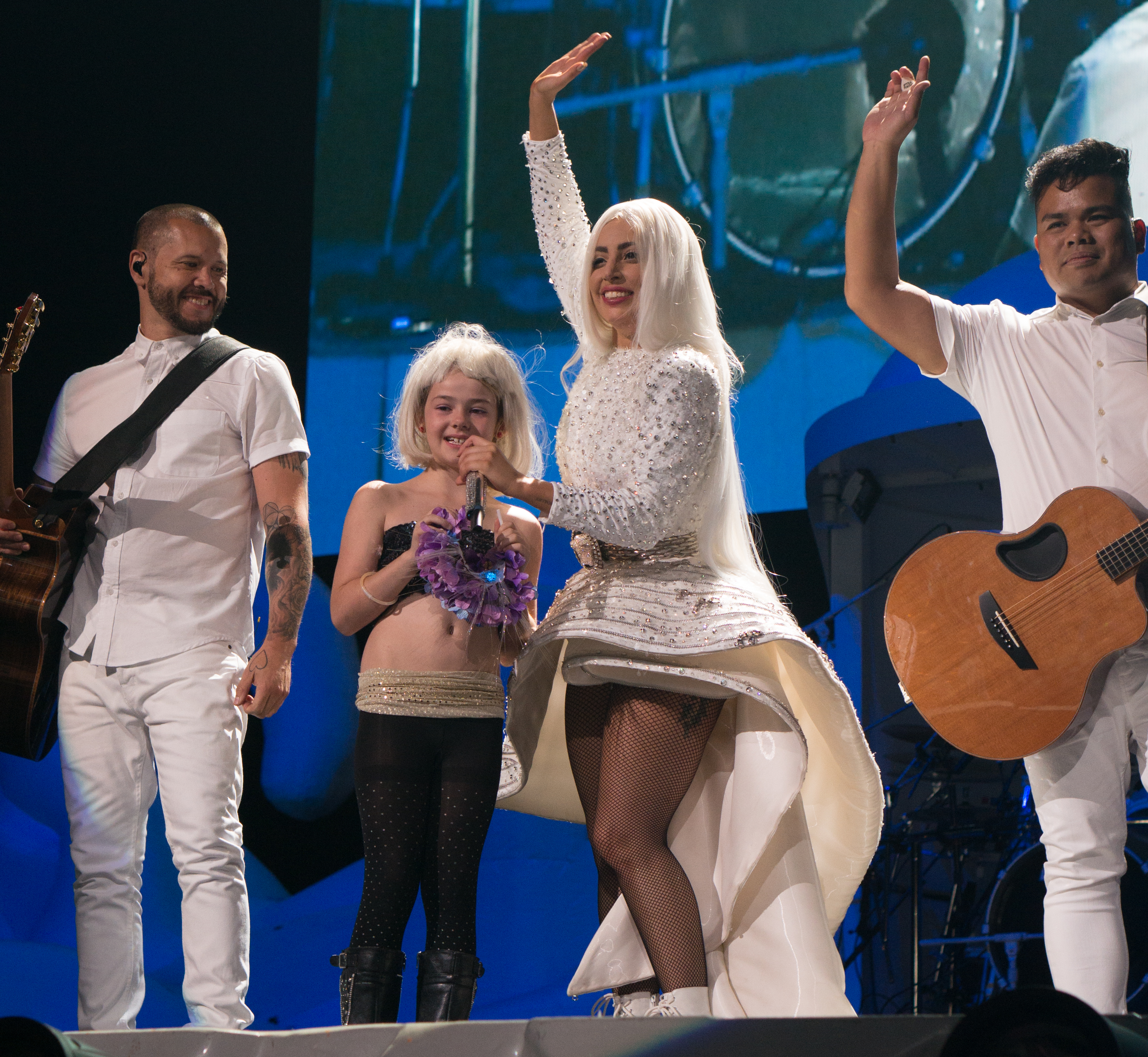
Gaga, surrounded by her guitarists and an audience member brought on stage, performs "Gypsy" on the ArtRave: The Artpop Ball tour, 2014

Gaga next performed "Gypsy" at her ArtRave concert in November 2013 at the Brooklyn Navy Yard, where she sang along with a live band. During the performance, Gaga gave a shout-out to artist Jeff Koons, who was heavily involved in the visuals related to the Artpop era and its campaigns, and dedicated the song to him. She again performed "Gypsy" on a piano on a Saturday Night Live show later that month, wearing a rainbow colored leotard with giant shoulder pads. Around the one minute mark, when the tempo of the song changes from a ballad to its original anthemic composition, a band stepped onstage from the shadows behind as well as dancers, who danced and created a party atmosphere. Hillary Hughes of The Village Voice found similarities in Gaga's vocals to those of singer Lana Del Rey. She felt that "Gaga plowed into 'Gypsy' with the aplomb of a Vegas lounge goddess from the future... Girl hit her notes, and well, and I'd take 'Gypsy' over 'Applause' or 'Born This Way' any day of the week, but 'Gypsy' on SNL was a bit of a confusing display from beginning to end."

"Gypsy" was performed on The Howard Stern Show on November 12, 2013. During her second Thanksgiving television special, Lady Gaga and the Muppets Holiday Spectacular, which aired on ABC, Gaga sang "Gypsy" as a duet with Kermit the Frog. Myles McNutt of The A.V. Club criticised the performance saying that "Kermit['s performance] was earnest and well [executed], but it didn't feel like the product of a Lady Gaga and the Muppets special; it felt like Kermit making a cameo in a Lady Gaga special, a problem given the shared billing in the title." Conversely, Rolling Stone's Marissa Muller listed it as one of the five memorable moments from the special.

Gaga performed "Gypsy" as the encore to her 2014 show at South by Southwest (SXSW). It was also the closing song of her 2014 ArtRave: The Artpop Ball tour. She sang it wearing long white wig and a dress with a long white train. During some of the shows, Gaga brought audience members onstage to sing the song together. Rob Sheffield of Rolling Stone criticised the choice of the song as the show's finale, saying that it felt anticlimactic. "After a one-song encore of 'Gypsy', the house lights came up... it was startling to realize the show was already over. [Gaga] didn't have superstar moves or hits saved up for the big finale—she decided not to do a big finale at all," he concluded.

== Credits and personnel ==
Credits adapted from the liner notes of Artpop.

=== Management ===
- Recorded at Record Plant Studios, Hollywood, California and CRC Studios, Chicago, Illinois
- Mixed at Larrabee North Studios, North Hollywood, California and Popcultur Studios, Paris, France
- Mastered at Oasis Mastering Studios, Burbank, California
- Stefani Germanotta P/K/A Lady Gaga (BMI) Sony ATV Songs LLC/House of Gaga Publishing, LLC/GloJoe Music Inc. (BMI), Maxwell and Carter Publishing, LLC (ASCAP).

=== Personnel ===
- Lady Gaga – songwriter, lead vocals, producer, guitars, piano
- Madeon – songwriter, producer, mixing
- RedOne – songwriter
- Paul "DJ White Shadow" Blair – songwriter
- Dave Russell – recording
- Benjamin Rice – recording
- Bill Malina – recording
- Ghazi Hourani – recording
- Daniel Zaidenstadt – recording assistant
- Andrew Robertson – recording assistant
- Steve Faye – recording assistant
- Manny Marroquin – mixing
- Chris Gallant – mixing assistant
- Delhert Bowers – mixing assistant
- Tim Stewart – guitar
- Nicole Ganther – background vocals
- Natalie Ganther – background vocals
- Lyon Gray – background vocals
- Ivy Skoff – union contract administrator
- Gene Grimaldi – mastering

== Charts ==
Weekly chart performance for "Gypsy"
Chart (2013)	Peak position
South Korea International (Gaon)	37
US Pop Digital Songs (Billboard)	26
