= ArtRave =

Promotional concert by Lady Gaga

- Promotional concert by Lady Gaga
- Promotional poster for the event
- Location: Brooklyn Navy Yard, New York, U.S.
- Venue: Duggal Greenhouse
- Associated album: Artpop
- Start date: November 10, 2013
- End date: November 11, 2013

Lady Gaga concert chronology
- Born This Way Ball (2012–2013); ArtRave (2013); Lady Gaga Live at Roseland Ballroom (2014)

ArtRave (stylized as artRAVE) was a two-day event hosted by Lady Gaga from November 10–11, 2013, as part of the promotional campaign for her third studio album, Artpop (2013). The event, held in a large warehouse in the Brooklyn Navy Yard in New York, served as an album release party and included a press conference and a live performance. During the press conference, Gaga revealed "the world's first flying dress", called the Volantis, confirmed plans to stage a performance in space in 2015, and introduced new works by Marina Abramović, Inez van Lamsweerde and Vinoodh Matadin, Jeff Koons, and Robert Wilson. The warehouse contained a giant statue of Gaga created by Koons on one side and other artworks, while screens all around displayed videos of Gaga's performances with Abramović. There were contortionists, a DJ booth, as well as free food and drink for the assembled crowd.

The event was to have been sponsored by American Express, however they backed out at the last moment failing to come to terms regarding ArtRave's production. Gaga performed a concert which was streamed live on Vevo and later rebroadcast through the website's syndication partners. The set list consisted of songs from Artpop. On November 11, Clear Channel aired a half-hour special called Album Release Party with Lady Gaga, hosted by Ryan Seacrest on more than 150 radio stations throughout the United States. On November 19, The CW aired a television special with footage from the album release party. ArtRave received generally positive reviews from critics who noted the enormity of the production, as well as Gaga's performance and enthusiasm; the launch of Volantis was generally criticised.

== Background and conception ==
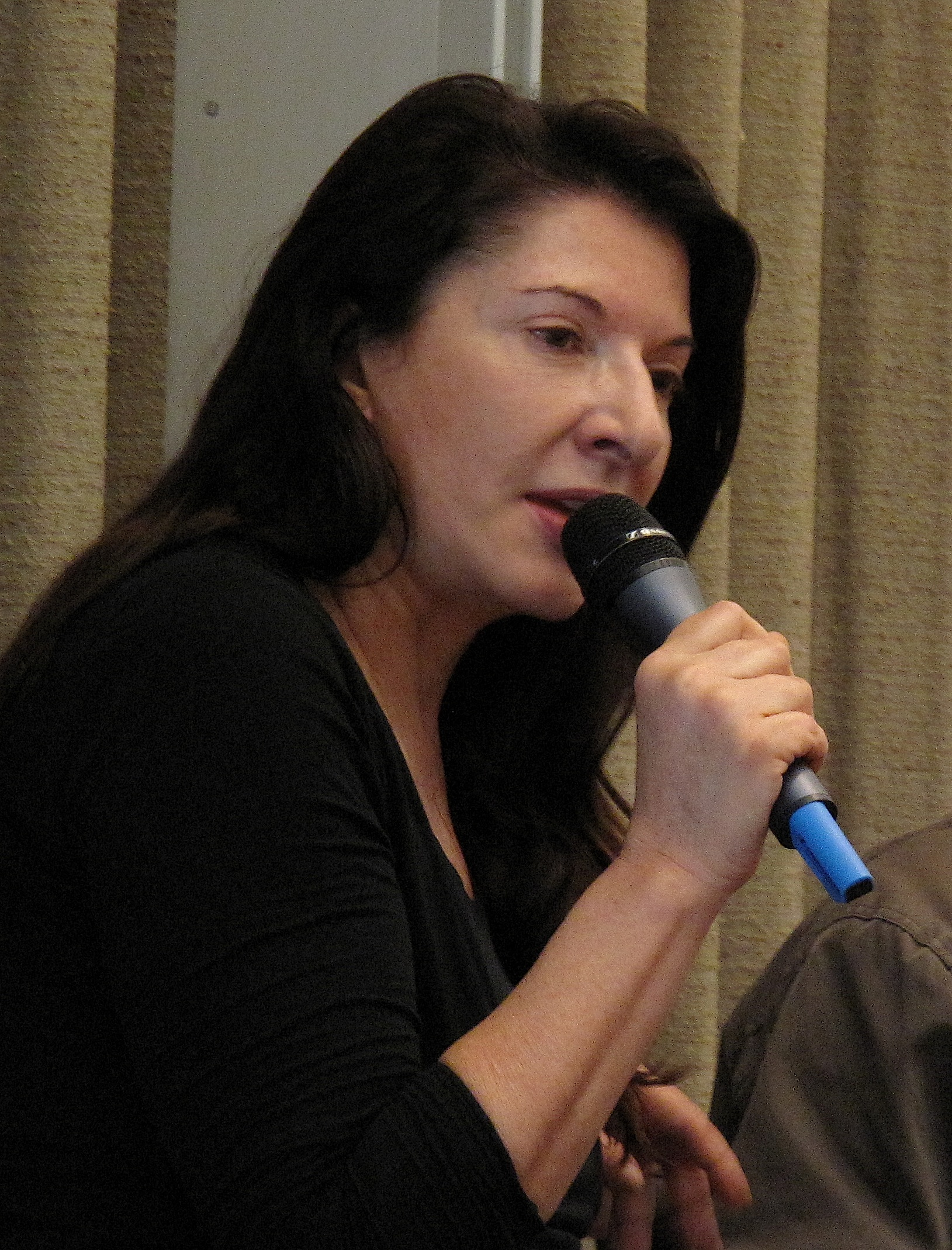
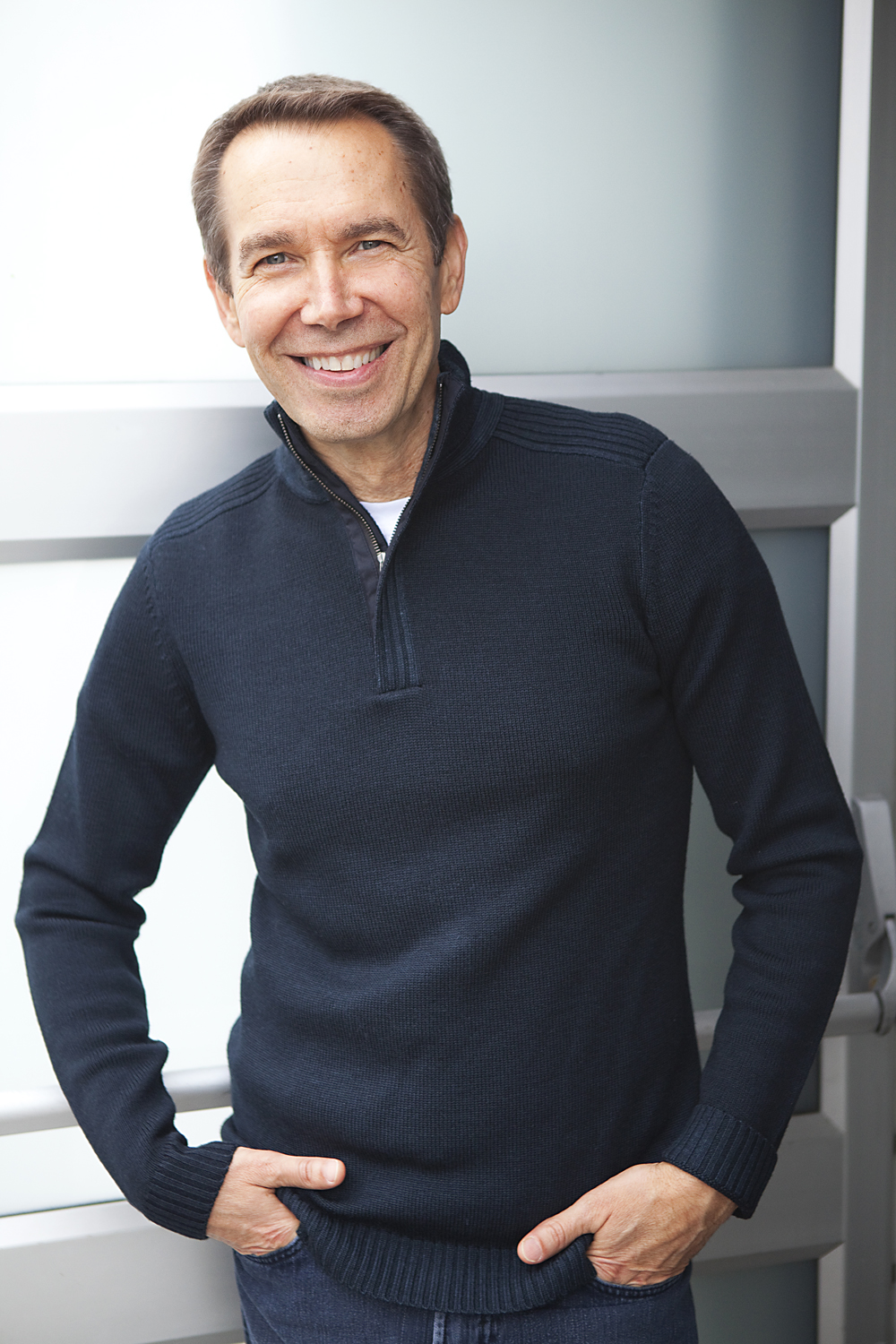
Lady Gaga collaborated with multiple artists, including Marina Abramović and Jeff Koons for the project.

Development of Lady Gaga's third studio album, Artpop, began shortly after the release of her second one, Born This Way in 2011. By the following year, Gaga started collaborating with producers Fernando Garibay and DJ White Shadow. In the meantime, she began presenting tracks to her record company and hoped to announce the album's working title by September 2013; a revelation that was actually disclosed one month earlier. Gaga described Artpop as "a celebration and a poetic musical journey", while contrasting it with the greater maturity of Born This Way and saying its follow-up would instead embrace a lack of maturity and responsibility.

Gaga recruited artist Jeff Koons for the project in early 2013; the two had met previously at a Metropolitan Museum of Art fashion event three years earlier, where Gaga had a live performance. According to Koons, Gaga "just kind of grabbed ahold of me and gave me a big hug around my waist and replied, 'You know, Jeff, I've been such a fan of yours, and when I was a kid just hanging out in Central Park I would talk to my friends about your work'." In addition to Interscope Records notifying mainstream media outlets about upcoming releases for Artpop in July 2013, Gaga announced plans for a multimedia software application which "combines music, art, fashion, and technology with a new interactive worldwide community."

A public announcement, posted on July 12, 2013, revealed plans for an ArtRave event the night before the release of Artpop, unveiling projects Gaga had been working on in collaboration with her creative team, the Haus of Gaga, Dutch photographer duo Inez van Lamsweerde and Vinoodh Matadin, avant -garde theater director Robert Wilson, performance artist Marina Abramović, and Koons. The announcement featured Gaga covering her bare breasts with her arms, with her forearm "Artpop" tattoo in plain sight, wearing a visor designed by London College of Fashion alumna Isabell Yalda Hellysaz. Another promotional image showed Gaga with long brown hair, sporting a pair of spectacles, sitting completely naked on a chair crafted from motherboards as she displays her unicorn thigh tattoo.

== Development and sponsors ==
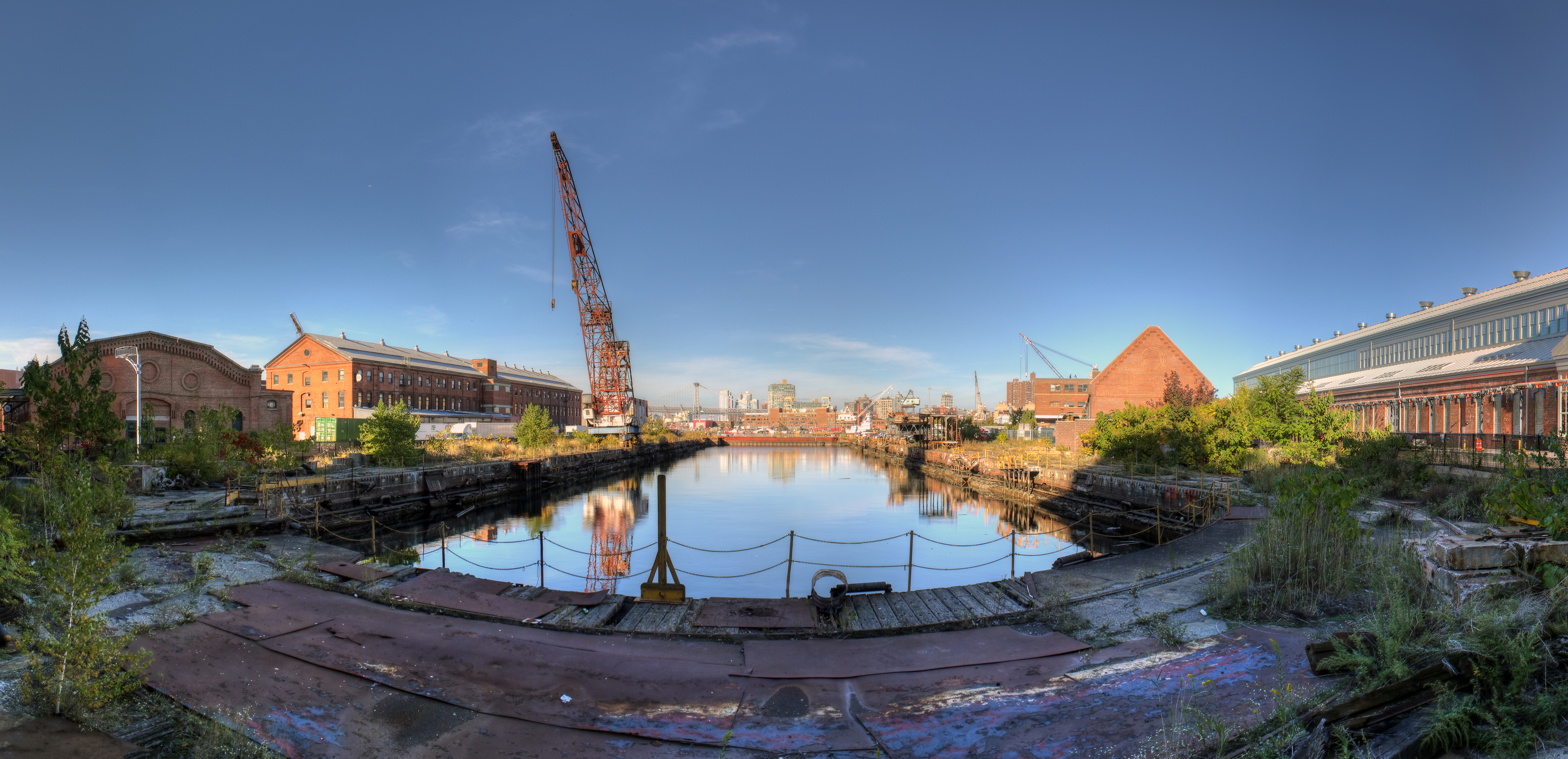
ArtRave was held at Duggal Greenhouse in the Brooklyn Navy Yard (pictured in 2007).

The event was held at the reportedly "top secret" Duggal Greenhouse, a large warehouse in the Brooklyn Navy Yard in Brooklyn, New York. It spanned two days, starting with a press conference on November 10 and extending into the morning of November 11, 2013, the album's release date in the United States. New York's OneNine Design company was responsible for the event planning and the production. Gaga also employed the Roschman Dance group to perform during the party and the event.

The interior of the yard was strewn with art pieces and art works. There was a food truck and open bar, and at one end there was a white stage with a spiral staircase. Opposite the stage, across the room, stood a giant statue of Gaga depicted naked, with her hands covering the breasts, created by Koons. In between her spread legs, Koons' characteristic blue gazing ball was placed; the statue was photographed and used in the album cover design for Artpop. Between the stage and the Gaga sculpture stood four other statues created by Koons In flagrante delicto, as well as the open bars where contortionists performed their intricate moves. The area was surrounded by large video screens which displayed Gaga's work with Abramović (showing the singer stumbling through a forest naked), Inez and Vinoodh, as well as with Wilson. Adjacent to the main space, there was a side area which featured an art installation called Binary Room, by artist Benjamin Rollins Caldwell, consisting of a room with all the furniture and flooring made up of old computer parts. Another room was dedicated to the display and usage of the Artpop app, as well as the fashions created by the Haus of Gaga for the ArtRave. There were personnel dressed in matching future-esque uniforms to walkthrough the app and its uses, including "the ability to read auras, create animated 3D Gifs and remix Gaga's music."

ArtRave was an "extravagant spectacle" according to Billboard's Andrew Hampp. However, he also noted that though the event did not have any sponsors, Gaga "was part of a select group of artists who have firmly thrown their branding lot in with the tech–music innovation space". Projects like Creators with Vice and Intel, as well as artists like will.i.am, Jay-Z and Björk were cited as precedents for crafting events and merging music and technology with art. Gaga, who had been named a creative director of Polaroid Corporation in 2010, had been involved in technical projects like Backplane with her former manager Troy Carter; Gaga separated from Carter a few days before the ArtRave. But Hampp believed that the explicit nature of the art works and the videos being shown had deprived Gaga of the opportunity of any "overt" sponsorship for the event. He explained that Billboard had reached out to three executives from American Express (AmEx), the company which was supposed to sponsor ArtRave but had "backed out" due to creative differences. Speaking off the record, the executives confirmed that AmEx had been slated to bear the expenses of the event as well as the live streaming. They later issued an apology statement:

American Express had been in discussions to potentially live stream Lady Gaga's performance during Sunday's ArtRave event. American Express decided not to proceed with the live stream because of an inability to reach a mutual agreement on the production of the event. However, American Express honored its commitments to Lady Gaga and her team, and the event was able to proceed without an official role for American Express. Lady Gaga is an incredible artist and we hope to work together in the future.

== Press conference ==
Gaga hosted a press conference, where she introduced Volantis, a battery-powered vehicle described as "the world's first flying dress." The white vehicle, described by Entertainment Weekly as a "hover dress", features a central column to which the wearer is clamped by a safety harness, in turn covered by a white plastic "dress". The column also houses the batteries and other equipment. Six lifting fan units are mounted on booms in a hexagonal formation radiating from the top of the column, giving the device the ability to hover three feet above the ground. The dress was designed by TechHaus, the Haus of Gaga's technology branch, and it took them two years to create.

Gaga promoted the dress by tweeting earlier in the day, "At 6pm EST today we will beta test Volantis with the world. We invite you into our creative process during her initial stages of lift off." For the demonstration, she transitioned from a white astronaut suit down to black tights and a black body wrap. According to Amy Phillips of Pitchfork, "[Volantis] roared to life and lurched forward a few feet, hovering. Then it did the same thing, backwards. Then it stopped. That was it." Hampp reported that "one attendee disparagingly referred to [it] as a 'Zamboni with fans'." Gaga quipped that the dress was "maybe a small step for Volantis... but a big-time step" for her. The singer also announced plans to stage the first musical performance from space, following previous reports about her singing at Zero G Colony, a music festival scheduled to occur at Spaceport America in New Mexico in 2015. The concert was later cancelled when a test flight for the project crashed.

== Concert and broadcast ==
Following the press conference, Gaga performed a live-streamed concert that included songs from Artpop. She appeared at 12:45 a.m., more than an hour after her expected start time of 11:30 p.m. Traffic overload to the music video website Vevo, which had exclusive rights to broadcast the concert portion of the event, was given as the reason for her delay. Following the site's crash, Gaga tweeted, "We're working on fixing the Livestream, there's A LOT of traffic. If Vevo does not work in your territory, fear not, we're posting video." Subsequently, she posted of her fans: "Only little monsters can crash Vevo. *face palm*." The live broadcast was available on-demand through various Vevo platforms in the: United States, Australia, Brazil, Canada, France, Germany, Ireland, Italy, The Netherlands, New Zealand, Poland, Spain, and the United Kingdom. Immediately following the initial broadcast, which began at 11:30 p.m. on November 10, the event was rebroadcast continuously for 48 hours.

Prior to the official concert, DJs Madeon, White Shadow and Lady Starlight played for the crowd. The concert started with Gaga performing two songs, beginning with "Aura" and then "Artpop". Next she performed "Venus" followed by choreographed performances of "Manicure" and "Sexxx Dreams". She then performed "Gypsy" and "Dope" with a live band. "Applause" and "Do What U Want" served as an encore; R. Kelly's vocals from the latter song were supplied by a backing track. Koons' sculpture of Gaga served as her backdrop. The stage and the performers' costumes were solid white. Gaga wore a "clown-like" white mask with black-and-white buoys. It was designed by Gareth Pugh for his Spring/Summer 2007 collection, and was the dress that had made him famous. She also made other costume changes throughout the night, including a set of three dresses during her performance of "Applause".

On November 11, Clear Channel broadcast a half-hour special called Album Release Party with Lady Gaga, hosted by Ryan Seacrest, and available on more than 150 radio stations throughout the United States. Video on demand access was available through Vevo's syndication partners, including YouTube, beginning on November 14. The CW aired a television special with footage from the album release party on November 19.

== Critical reception ==
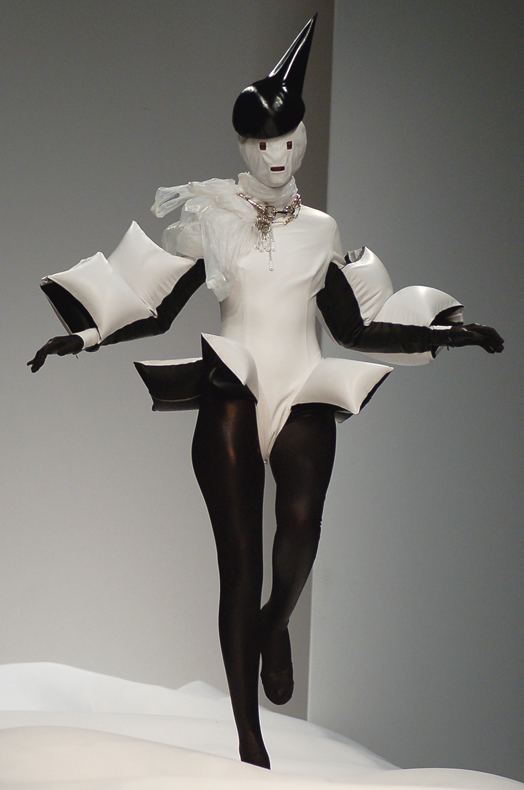
Gaga's dress designed by Gareth Pugh for the opening performance of "Aura". Marisa G. Muller from Rolling Stone compared the outfit to Michelin Man, the symbol of the Michelin tire company.

Pitchfork's Amy Phillips commended Gaga's performance saying that it was "amazing as usual – a master class in over-the-top theatrics, campy gender-bending, and cheeky fun... But it was almost beside the point. The whole Gaga machine, the whole Gaga world we were immersed in – that was the point. It was overwhelming, all consuming. Something even the best album promo cycles only dream of being." Phillips wondered how Gaga would be able to "top" the ArtRave event and listed it as an unprecedented promotional tool for an artist's album release cycle. Billboard's Andrew Hampp and Jason Lipshutz compared Gaga's outfit to a "bizarro" version of Jack Box, the mascot for Jack in the Box, and wrote that the lip-synched portion of her performance was "more pop art than artistic pop music." Hampp and Lipshutz summarized their experience by writing, "Even if the 'ARTPOP' live show still needs a bit of tinkering to fully captivate, Lady Gaga showed on Sunday night that she knows how to meld low art and high art at a party."

Writing for Rolling Stone, Marisa G. Muller noted that Gaga spoke of the artists and the personnel involved with the event continuously throughout the night, and "[despite] being more than an hour late, Gaga made her tight-knit audience of little monsters feel special... Sober, Gaga was still at her outlandish peak." David Drake of Complex found the ArtRave to be quite a production but like all things Gaga does he found it to be a "blend of the high-brow and the trashy, depth and superficiality, the thoughtful and the impulsive, and lots of other contradictions that make you think about the nature of philosophy and life and art." He gave a positive review of the main show, praising the sound system, the performances of "Gypsy" and "Do What U Want", and deduced that: "Perhaps this kind of ambition is music's future, at least for a certain breed of artist. Although Artpop doesn't sound retro per se, Lady Gaga's project as a whole does feel like a reaction to the idea that as far as the music goes, there's nothing new under the sun."

Carl Swanson of Vulture magazine was amazed by the ArtRave, from the Volantis display to the actual party area, and added that "[the] event, mostly staged for Gaga's cameras as well as those of the feverishly Instagramming guests, was surprisingly well organized for something so manifestly difficult. The idea was clearly to be in control of it." However, he noticed a bit of "vulnerability" in Gaga as she performed onstage. Swanson relegated Gaga's lectures about Koons and their collaboration as "borderline gibberish", adding that: "It's less of a collaboration than a feeling that she is searching to attach herself to something bigger than herself, something less evanescent than pop, or maybe just something to contain herself before she flames out completely, like a hashtag in the wind." Kia Makarechi of The Huffington Post was critical of the set up when Gaga had to wade through a crowd to reach the stage, but wrote that "[o]nce Gaga took the stage, however, all was nearly forgotten. The singer worked through the new album with an impressive commitment to weirdness." Nick Murray of Spin magazine criticized the "underwhelming display" of Volantis and found that Gaga's ideas about "changing the world" with the album and the technology were "both dry and ridiculous, vaguely utopian but overly confident in the liberating power of technology, and just when the whole thing was beginning to seem more and more like a farce, [Gaga] cannily explained that beyond whether the Volantis is ever mass-produced, 'the important thing is about the possibilities'."

== Set list ==
1. "Aura"
2. "Artpop"
3. "Venus"
4. "MANiCURE"
5. "Sexxx Dreams"
6. "Gypsy"
7. "Dope"

Encore

8. "Applause"
9. "Do What U Want"

== See also ==
- 2013 in art
- 2013 in aviation
- Performance art
