= Artpop (song) =

2013 song by Lady Gaga

Song by Lady Gaga

from the album Artpop
- Released: November 6, 2013
- Recorded: 2012
- Studio: Record Plant (Hollywood)
- Genre: Techno; Euro disco
- Length: 4:07
- Label: Streamline; Interscope
- Songwriters: Lady Gaga; Paul "DJ White Shadow" Blair; Dino Zisis; Nick Monson
- Producers: Paul "DJ White Shadow" Blair; Lady Gaga

Audio video
- "Artpop" on YouTube

"Artpop" (stylized in all caps) is a song by American singer Lady Gaga, released on November 6, 2013, from her third studio album of the same name. She wrote the song with Paul "DJ White Shadow" Blair, Dino Zisis, and Nick Monson; Blair and Gaga served as the song's main producers, with co-production by Monson and Zisis. "Artpop" was the first song developed for the album and led the composers to pursue other avenues of musical production. Described as the backbone of the record, Gaga did not want to experiment with the production of "Artpop", as she believed it to have an infinite aspect in it.

A techno song, "Artpop" features instrumentation from piano and guitars and has computerized musical sounds interspersed in between. The lyrics have been interpreted in several ways, including as a metaphor for a romantic relationship, Gaga's bond with her fans, the merging of art and pop, and a commentary on her public persona and self-promotion. "Artpop" received mixed reviews from critics who praised the low-key composition of the song compared to other tracks on the album, but panned the lyrics and the dated production.

"Artpop" was used in a "not safe for work" video for the album, which featured Gaga in various bizarre attires and a montage of the different promotional material leading to the release. Gaga had premiered "Artpop" during her 2013 iTunes Festival performance. She subsequently performed it at her ArtRave album release party, on the Lady Gaga and the Muppets Holiday Spectacular on ABC with English singer Elton John, and The Tonight Show Starring Jimmy Fallon. It also served as the opening song to her 2014 ArtRave: The Artpop Ball tour.

== Background and development ==
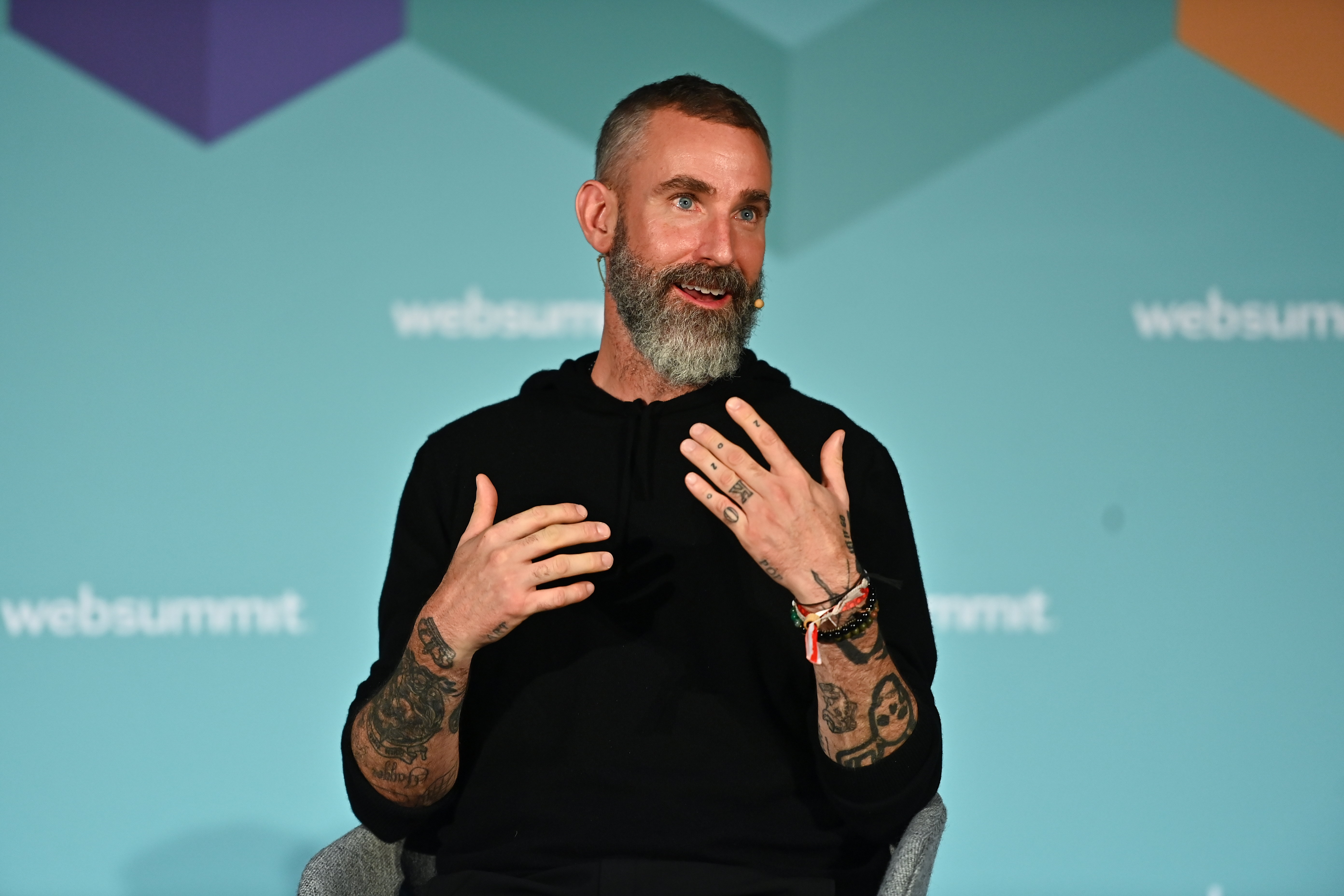
DJ White Shadow co-wrote and co-produced "Artpop", one of the first songs created for the album.

Development of Lady Gaga's third studio album, Artpop, began shortly after the release of her second one, Born This Way (2011), and by the following year, the album's concepts were "beginning to flourish" as Gaga collaborated with producers Fernando Garibay and DJ White Shadow. However, while on tour for the Born This Way Ball, Gaga had to undergo a hip surgery in February 2013 which forced the singer into a six-month hiatus, and this rehabilitation became one of the inspirations behind the album. According to White Shadow, the title track was one of the first songs penned for the album, which created the backbone for the record. Calling it a "defining moment" of Artpop's creation, the producer explained that the title track led them to explore other avenues in terms of musical aspirations. Written and produced by Gaga, White Shadow, Monson and Dino Zisis, "Artpop" was called the swan song of the album by the singer. Talking to Sirius XM Radio, where she gave an in-depth analysis of each song from the album, Gaga explained:

'Artpop' is really an inferno and it's the only song on the record that I didn't really wanna go anywhere or explode or orgasm. Because then it would just be like composing something that would be just like every other sort of orgasm that I've ever had. And because its really the center of the record, I really wanted there to be a more infinite tone, to this concept of Art+Pop, that we can put art in the front and not have the corporate world to control in art anymore. How can we the artist back our ideas and for our visions to be the most important thing. The thing that's driving culture, driving these corporations. I didn't wanted ['Artpop'] to grow too much, I wanted it to kind of hypnotize people and become like a mantra.

== Recording and composition ==
Initial recording sessions for Artpop coincided with the Born This Way Ball. Gaga spent the majority of her recording time on "Artpop" with White Shadow but she did not want the final version to be edited further, unlike her other songs. The song was recorded at Record Plant Studios, Hollywood, California, by Dave Russell and Benjamin Lader, with Lader and Daniel Zaidenstadt also working as assistants during the final mix. Russell also did the mixing of the track for the track at Record Plant and at Heard It! Studios with additional mixing being done by Dino "SpeeedoVee" Zisis. Instrumentation for "Artpop" included piano and guitars by Gaga and Monson. Background vocals were sung by Nichole Ganther, Natalie Ganther and Lyon Gray with vocal arrangement by Gaga. Finally, Rick Pearl did the additional programming and Gene Grimaldi did the audio mastering at Oasis Mastering Studios in Burbank, California. According to the sheet music published at Musicnotes.com, "Artpop" is set in the time signature of common time, with a dance-pop tempo of 117 beats per minute. It is composed in the key of D minor with Gaga's vocals spanning the tonal nodes of F_{3} to A_{4}. The song follows a basic sequence of Dm–Gm–F–C as its chord progression.

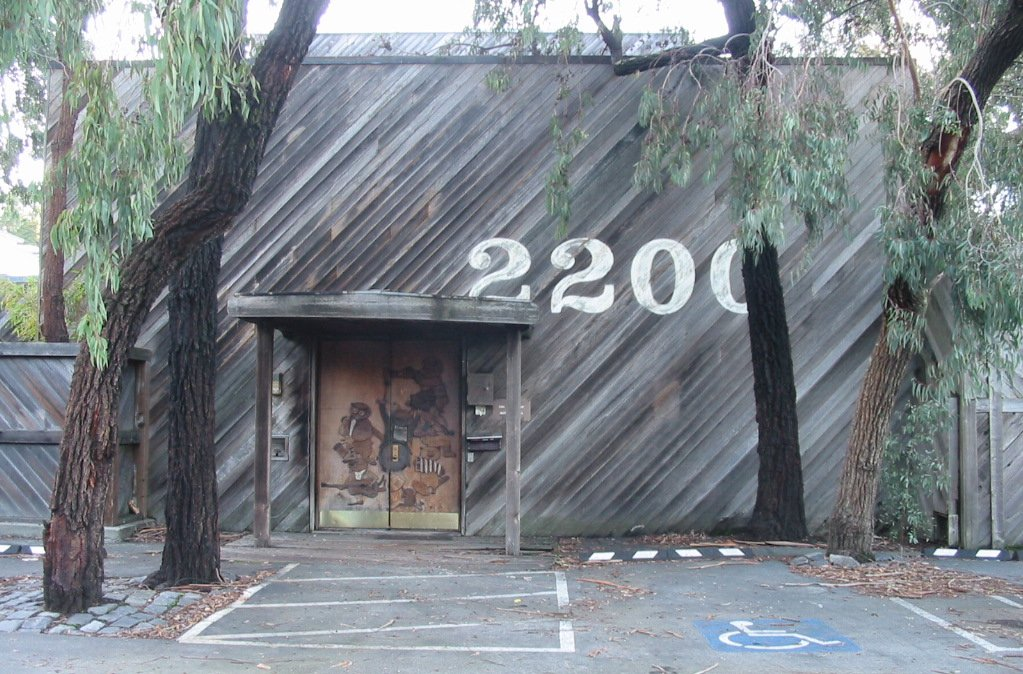
The song was recorded at Record Plant Studios in Hollywood, California.

In a review for Billboard, Jason Lipshutz described "Artpop" as Gaga's manifesto about her creativity, calling it a "lurching electro-jazz beast" whose beats became louder and complex as it reached climax. Consisting of strings, the techno song has a beat similar to Selena Gomez & the Scene's 2011 single "Love You like a Love Song" with its electronic composition, and a groove comparable to singer Kylie Minogue's 2001 hit single "Can't Get You Out of My Head". Interspersed between are computerized musical sounds and the chorus, which has a coo-ing accompanied with the main vocals, like Michael Jackson. Both Sal Cinquemani of Slant Magazine and Kevin Harley from The Independent described "Artpop" as a Euro disco song, with Cinquemani also comparing its sound to Madonna's 2005 album Confessions on a Dance Floor. It begins with the singer uttering the line "Come to me with all your subtext of fantasy", which HuffPost described as indicative of the enigmatic nature of the song. Gaga explained the lyrics were a metaphor about love with the chorus line "We could belong together, Artpop". She believed that if her fans and herself could be together, that would probably mean a bonding for art and pop too. On the contrary, Jim Farber from New York Daily News believed that the love relationship was sidelined for that between art and pop with the lyrics.

There are other dimensions to the lyrics, with Gaga playing off her image of self-promotion and criticisms directed at her with the line "I try to sell myself, but I am really laughing because I just want the music not the bling". In a review for Artpop, Simon Chandler from Tiny Mix Tapes gave a detailed analysis of the lyrical composition. According to him, Gaga wanted to portray her music as boundless in its meaning with "Artpop", but it appeared to be arrogant since most of the conclusions derived about her music is from her public persona created and its media coverage. Chandler believed that the lyrics wanted to drive home a point about Gaga being the center for any discussion. With the previous lyrics, the implication is that Gaga's impassive personality utilizes her music to sell her brand name to the general crowd, and primarily fuels the public interest in her.

== Release and reception ==
A teaser for "Artpop" was previewed as part of snippets from the parent album until its final release on November 11, 2013. A short film, An Artpop Film Starring Lady Gaga, was released on November 20, 2013, as promotion for the album. Directed by Dutch fashion photography duo Inez and Vinoodh, the two-and-a-half-minute film is set to "Artpop" and features Gaga in a succession of different looks. It begins with Gaga delivering a monologue about the album before showing her in various states of undress, covered in dirt, and wearing several wigs. One sequence recreates the artwork for promotional single "Dope", including its dark wig, low-brimmed hat, oversized jacket, single knee-high boot, facial bruising and mouth grill. Gaga shows a range of emotion in the film, including caressing a mannequin and applying dirt on her body, but most of the time she simply stares towards the camera. Zayda Rivera from New York Daily News expressed her difficulty in understanding the film, but added that "hypnotic musical backdrop of her single 'Artpop' perfectly matches the artsy, bewildering and even disturbing images that run through the fast and slow editing." Gaga admitted that she had performed for 12 hours while making the film.

"The bloopy title track boasts the great reveal that 'my Artpop could mean anything' and the impression of a pop star scrambling, post-hoc, towards coherence never goes away. Illusion, masks, bareness, posing: all are exercised as ideas, without Gaga really settling on a preference."

— Kitty Empire, review of Artpop, The Guardian

The track received mixed reviews from music critics. Evan Sawdey from PopMatters believed that the vibe of the previous track on the album, "Do What U Want", carried off to "Artpop" which he described as "strange" and "hypnotic" and the best thing on the parent album. Harley listed "Artpop" as one of the more aurally pleasurable tracks from the album. Calling it a "standout" track, Andrew Barker from Variety compared Gaga's vocals to those of Debbie Harry, with their cold disposition. Emily McKey from NME called the song "slow and purringly sexy", believing that the line "My artpop could mean anything" referred to the trivial concept of the album itself. Critic Greg Kot from Chicago Tribune believed that "Artpop" was the only song on the album, where there was a hint of what the actual composition of the over all record should have been. Justin Miller from Harper's Bazaar called the song more intimate that the previous tracks in the album, but felt it was a techno-ballad and the most diffused composition for Gaga.

Negative reviews came from Holly Williams of Contactmusic.com, who was extremely disappointed with the track. Williams felt a rapid decline in the quality of music with the title track, which she believed should have been "climactic, inventive and a little bit trippy with such a title" but found its tempo to be slow and mundane. Maura Johnson from Spin felt that lyrics like "I just love the music, not the bling" appeared insincere on Gaga's behalf since her career graph showed that the singer was more infatuated with Fame in the 21st century. "Not the deepest statement, but also not that unique to the new millennium," Johnson concluded. Mikael Wood of the Los Angeles Times viewed the line "My artpop could mean anything" as reflecting Gaga's unwillingness to align herself with a single viewpoint, but felt that such ideas, along with those expressed on "Applause", were ultimately unconvincing on the record. John Walker from MTV News rated it two out of five stars, calling it boring. Chris Bossman from Consequence of Sound compared the composition of the track to a "dying, old school war dialer". Melinda Newman from HitFix called the song "too quirky" and felt that it could only be successful if remixed properly. Robert Copsey from Digital Spy believed that the chorus line "My artpop could mean anything" made the concept of the album all the more confusing, instead of simplifying Gaga's brash statements about her musical outputs. Ericka Welch from The Huffington Post called the song as "pretentious" and the least interesting endeavor on the album. She believed that "Artpop" failed to embody the concept of the album and was plagued with the same inconsequential lyrics that was visible during her Born This Way era. She concluded by giving the example: "Like a mad scientist trying to create life, Gaga's experiment to fuse ART and POP sometimes results in overly ambitious deformities with six legs."

== Live performances ==
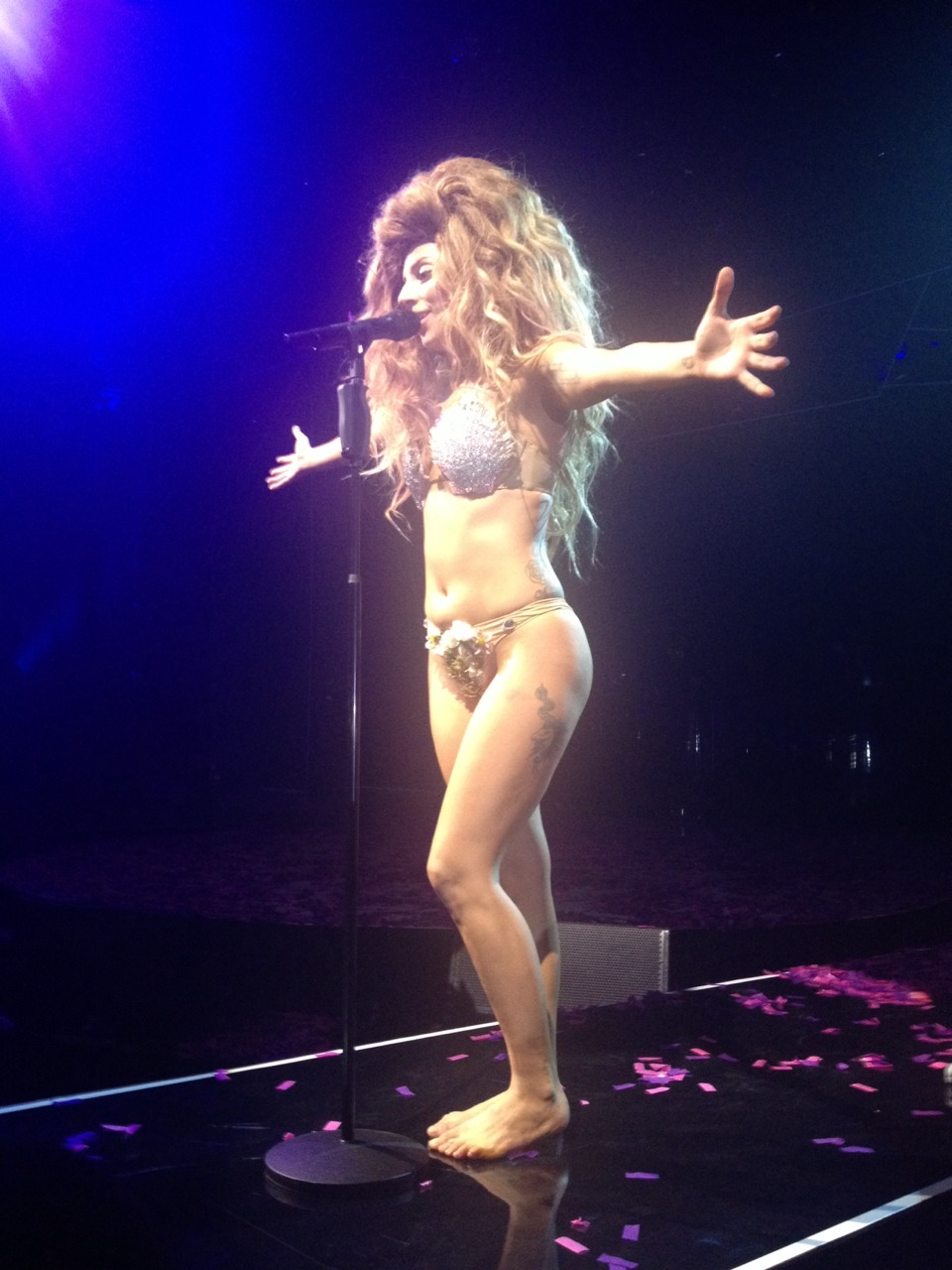
Gaga performing "Artpop" at the 2013 iTunes Festival in London. She wears the characteristic sea-shell bikini and the blond wig.

Previous to the release of the album or the teasers, Gaga performed "Artpop" live on September 1, 2013, at the iTunes Festival in London. The song was the third performance that evening, from a set list containing eight tracks. Following the performance of "Manicure" and a piano interlude, Gaga stripped off her clothes onstage until she was in a sea-shell bikini and an enormous blond wig, and started singing the song. Ashley Percival from The Huffington Post complimented the performance, saying that the song "showed the most promise onstage". A review at Capital FM website found the song akin to her 2009 single, "Paparazzi". Jenn Selby from Glamour called the performance a "heartfelt piece of pop music accompanied with its own, YMCA-like arm dance." Digital Spy's Copsey was confused with the performance, but enjoyed the downtempo composition of "Artpop" and rated it three-and-a-half stars out of five. Writing for The Guardian, Kitty Empire criticized the absence of clothing but praised the overall performance. Gaga next performed "Artpop" during her ArtRave party for the release of the album.

Gaga performed the song on Lady Gaga and the Muppets Holiday Spectacular, her second Thanksgiving television special which aired on ABC on November 28, 2013. She had invited singer Elton John as special guest star for the performance. After a performance of John's 1974 single "Bennie and the Jets", the duo started singing "Artpop". They were seated opposite to each other on piano, and Gaga was ornamented in a dress made of Coca-Cola cans. During the chorus, they were joined by The Muppets who aided with background vocals. Chris Willman from Billboard called John as the best guest performer of the special. Maricela Gonzales from Entertainment Weekly was impressed with the performance, saying that although she did not understand the message behind the song, "[w]hat is clear is that Gaga and Elton John belong together. I'm serious, I want to go to that show."

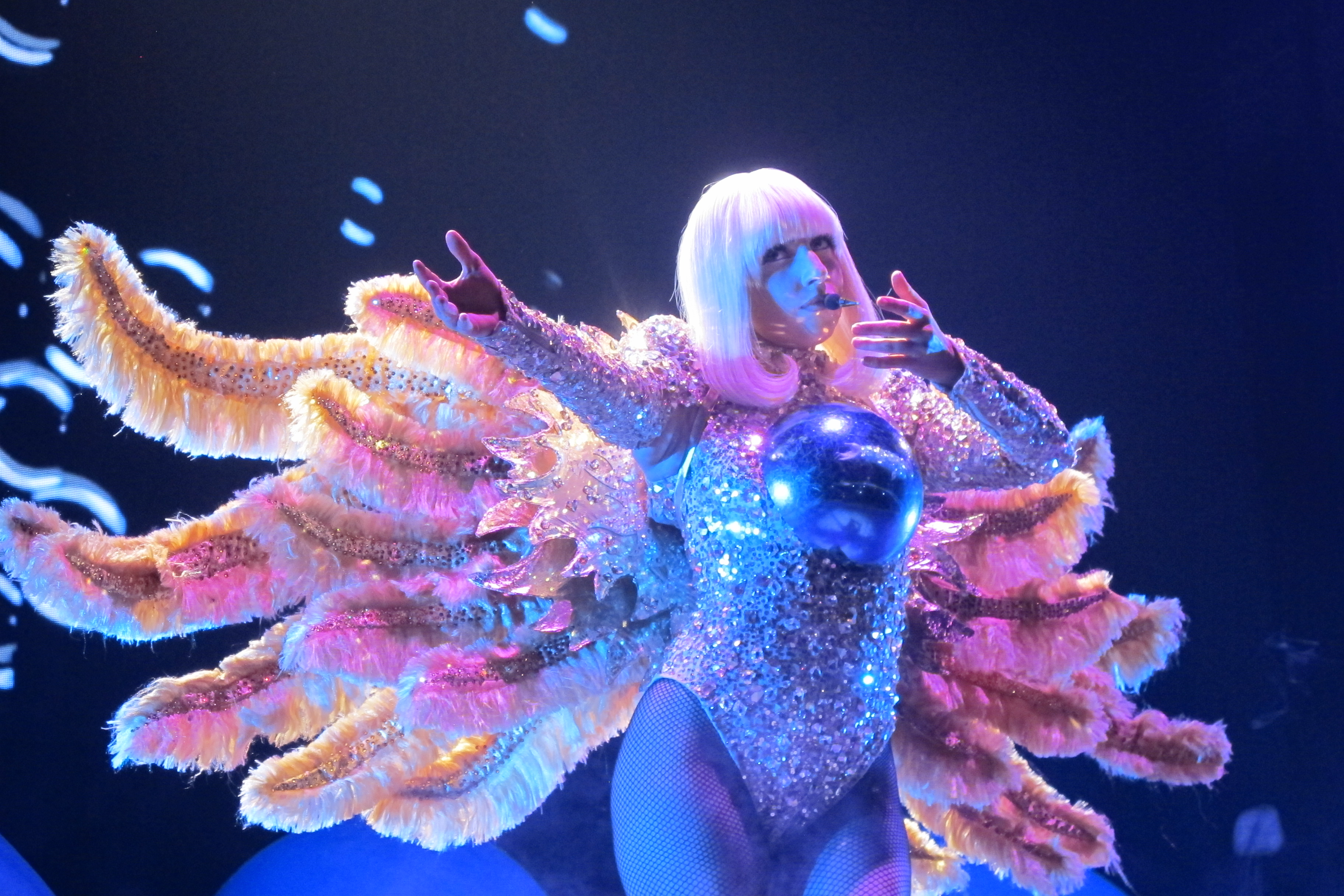
Gaga performing "Artpop" as the opening number of 2014's ArtRave: The Artpop Ball

She also performed the song on The Tonight Show Starring Jimmy Fallon on February 18, 2014, marking her return to live performances after a period in which she had struggled with depression and conflicts within her inner circle. The singer wore a white dress and sported a platinum blond wig; the ensemble made her look like fashion designer Donatella Versace. Starting the song as an acoustic version, Gaga played a crystal piano placed atop a ramp at the end of the stage. By the second chorus, the electronic beats of the song started and she descended to the front of the stage to complete the performance with a dance. It was praised by Melinda Newman from HitFix who said that "Gaga excels when it is just her at a piano performing the songs with the barest of accompaniment."

At the ArtRave: The Artpop Ball tour of 2014, "Artpop" was added as the opening song of the set list. The show starts off with a video introduction about the tour, followed by dancers appearing on stage with balloons and blue gazing balls. The video continues to play as Gaga emerges from beneath the stage, wearing a golden leotard with wings and a blue ball attached to her bosom. Dry ice and confetti accompanied her arrival on stage, as Gaga sang the song standing atop two male dancers wearing scuba diving masks.

== Credits and personnel ==
Credits adapted from the liner notes of Artpop.

=== Management ===
- Recorded at Record Plant Studios, Hollywood, California
- Stefani Germanotta P/K/A Lady Gaga (BMI) Sony ATV Songs LLC/House of Gaga Publishing, LLC/GloJoe Music Inc. (BMI), Maxwell and Carter Publishing, LLC (ASCAP), administered by Universal Music Publishing Group and Maxwell and Carter Publishing, LLC (BMI) administered by Universal Music Publishing Group

=== Personnel ===
- Lady Gaga – songwriter, lead vocals, producer, piano, guitar, vocal arrangement
- Paul "DJ White Shadow" Blair – songwriter, producer
- Nick Monson – songwriter, co-producer, guitar
- Dino Zisis – songwriter, co-producer
- Dave Russell – recording, mixing
- Benjamin Rice – recording and mixing assistant
- Daniel Zaidenstadt – recording assistant
- Dino "SpeedoVee" Zisis – additional recording
- Rick Pearl – additional programming
- Nicole Ganther – background vocals
- Natalie Ganther – background vocals
- Lyon Gray – background vocals
- Ivy Skoff – union contract administrator
- Gene Grimaldi – mastering

== Charts ==
Weekly chart performance for "Artpop"
Charts (2013)	Peak position
France (SNEP)	185
South Korea International (Gaon)	64
