= TechHaus Volantis =

American electric-powered hover vehicle

- Lady Gaga aboard the TechHaus Volantis in 2013

General information
- Type: Electric-powered hover vehicle
- National origin: United States
- Manufacturer: TechHaus
- Designer: Studio XO
- Status: Operational
- Primary user: Lady Gaga
- Number built: One

History
- Introduction date: 2013
- First flight: November 10, 2013

The TechHaus Volantis is an American electric-powered hover vehicle commissioned by American singer Lady Gaga as a "flying dress" in support of her 2013 album Artpop. It was designed by the UK-based Studio XO and built by TechHaus, the technology branch of Gaga's creative team.

The device functioned as a scaled-up, remotely piloted drone capable of lifting a single passenger a few feet above the ground, with Gaga debuting it at her ArtRave event at the Brooklyn Navy Yard. Its unveiling was met with mixed to largely critical reactions from journalists, who described the demonstration as anticlimactic, noisy, and only briefly airborne, while also noting its unintentional humor and conceptual audacity rather than any genuine technological breakthrough.

== Design and development ==
Volantis is a remote-piloted hover vehicle capable of carrying a single passenger. It was designed by the United Kingdom-based agency Studio XO in consultation with drone designer and pilot Gus Calderon and was constructed in the US by TechHaus, the technology branch of Lady Gaga's creative team, the Haus of Gaga. Begun in 2011, it took two years to complete. Calderon later described the process as particularly demanding, citing the challenge of integrating fashion and technology within a limited time frame. According to Studio XO co-founder Benjamin Males, while the concept may appear rooted in science fiction, emerging trends in vehicle design, space exploration, and jet-pack technology made the idea of a personal aerial vehicle—one that also prioritizes style—feel increasingly plausible rather than fantastical.

The design is essentially a scaled-up drone. Six lifting rotor units are mounted on booms in a hexagonal formation radiating from a central hub, giving the device the ability to hover three feet above the ground.

A triangular vertical truss made of titanium extends down from the hub, with a circular landing platform at the bottom. A single passenger stands on the platform and is secured to the truss by a safety harness. The harness is in turn covered by a white molded carbon fiber "dress".

Each rotor unit comprises two concentric and contra-rotating rotors made from carbon fiber composite, driven by electric motors and mounted within a common duct. Power is provided by onboard batteries. The battery system is located at the top of the central column, which helps to minimize the length and weight of power cabling. The passenger has no flight controls – a remote pilot operates the craft via radio control.

== Unveiling and public presentation ==
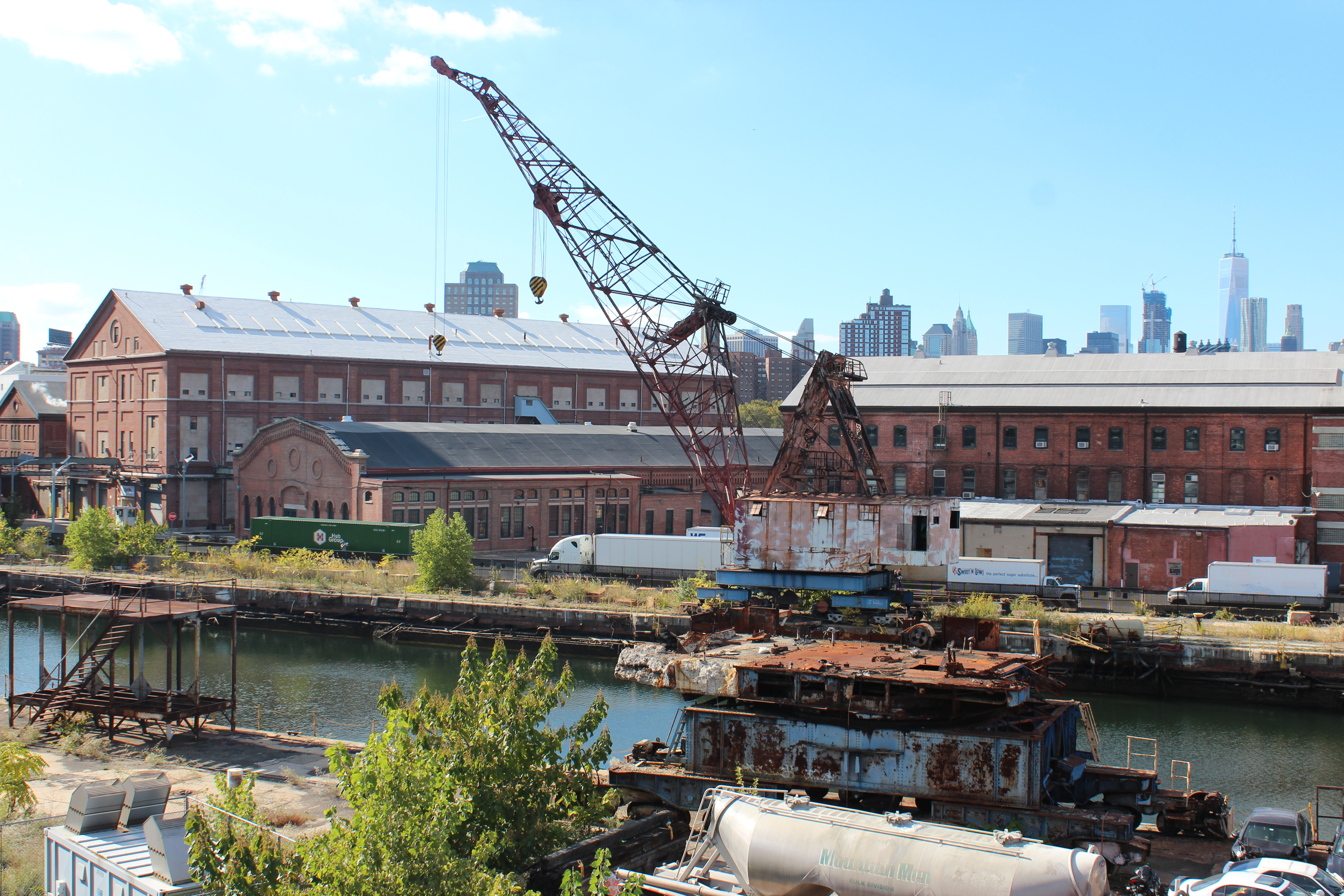
The vehicle was presented at a warehouse located at the Brooklyn Navy Yard.

On November 10, 2013, during the opening day of her ArtRave event promoting her third studio album Artpop, Lady Gaga hosted a press conference at the Duggal Greenhouse in the Brooklyn Navy Yard, where she introduced Volantis as "the world's first flying dress". It has been described by Entertainment Weekly as a "hover dress" and a "wearable dirigible". At the event, Volantis took off and hovered a few feet (a meter or so) above the stage. It was flown forward a short distance, then brought back and landed.

Gaga had promoted the dress by tweeting earlier in the day, "At 6pm EST today we will beta test VOLANTIS with the world. We invite you into our creative process during her initial stages of lift off." She quipped that the dress was "maybe a small step for Volantis... but a big-time step" for her. Gaga said she wanted the launch event to focus on something that mattered to her more than the spectacle itself: young people around the world, whose creativity and imagination she described as limitless and deeply inspiring. While she downplayed Volantis as merely "a vehicle", she added that the dress is "essentially a metaphor for me. I will be a vehicle today for their voices."

In May 2017, Volantis was displayed in the "Drones: Is the Sky the Limit?" exhibition at the Intrepid Sea, Air & Space Museum, in New York.

== Reception and commentary ==
Nick Murray of Spin magazine criticized the "underwhelming display" of Volantis during Gaga's ArtRave event, describing it as both an embrace and a send-up of tech culture's fixation on grandiose yet impractical innovation. He noted that the fan-powered, hydroplane-like device produced considerable noise but only managed a few brief hops—rising just a few feet off the ground—ultimately traveling only a short distance within the Brooklyn Navy Yard warehouse. Kia Makarechi of HuffPost echoed similar sentiments, characterizing the demonstration as somewhat anticlimactic. He reported that after Gaga climbed into the molded-bust apparatus, it lifted her only a few feet off the ground during its brief journey across the venue, suggesting that while the display fell short as a technological breakthrough, it might find more success as a fun visual element in a future music video.

Amy Phillips of Pitchfork framed the Volantis unveiling as both unintentionally comic and oddly endearing. She noted that Gaga preceded the demonstration with an earnest speech about the device's world-changing potential, only for the machine to briefly hover forward and backward a few feet before stopping entirely—an episode likened to a scene from the 1984 film This Is Spinal Tap. Despite the anticlimax, Phillips found charm in Gaga's sincerity, portraying the moment as a rare instance of a global pop star willingly courting ridicule in pursuit of an idealistic, almost quaint belief in innovation and the power of imagination. David Drake of Complex described the spectacle as faintly ridiculous yet oddly exciting, arguing that the sheer audacity of the concept made it genuinely entertaining, even as it jokingly questioned who might provide the soundtrack for Volantis' built-in stereo system.

In a broader retrospective assessment of the Artpop era, Caroline Sullivan of The Guardian cited Volantis as emblematic of what she viewed as Gaga's increasing reliance on high-concept spectacle, writing that such surreal gestures were "starting to look like sub-Björkian stunts" as her public image risked overshadowing her music. Writers from Billboard observed that despite the technical limitations, the "ambitious message behind the device" helped set the tone for Gaga's ArtRave event, emphasizing boundless possibility, the importance of supporting artists and creativity, and the idea that collaboration and mutual respect could contribute to improving the human condition.

During a 2025 Q&A, when a fan suggested she wear Volantis down the aisle at her wedding, Gaga laughed and replied that it would be dangerous.

== Specifications ==
Data from Hampp, Pallister

General characteristics

- Crew: none
- Capacity: one passenger
- Diameter: 13 ft 1.1 in (3.990 m)
- Height: 7 ft 6.4 in (2.297 m)
- Powerplant: 12 × electric motors powered by 250 Ah batteries and mounted two motors and rotors coaxially per duct unit

Performance

- Service ceiling: 3 ft (0.91 m)

Avionics

- Remote piloting control equipment

== See also ==
- 2013 in aviation
- List of individual dresses
- Helicopter
- Hiller VZ-1 Pawnee flying platform
- Personal air vehicle
- Volantor (Moller M200)
