= Aura (Lady Gaga song) =

Song by Lady Gaga

from the album Artpop
- Released: November 6, 2013
- Studio: Record Plant (Hollywood)
- Genre: Mariachi; EDM
- Length: 3:55
- Label: Streamline; Interscope
- Songwriters: Lady Gaga; Anton Zaslavski; Amit Duvdevani; Erez Eisen
- Producers: Zedd; Infected Mushroom; Lady Gaga

Lyric video
- "Aura" on YouTube

"Aura" is a song recorded by American singer Lady Gaga for her third studio album, Artpop (2013). She co-wrote and co-produced the track with Zedd and the psychedelic trance duo Infected Mushroom. Initially entitled "Burqa", an Infected Mushroom demo is the song's backbone. "Aura", which explores different facets of the singer, is a mariachi and EDM song with Western guitar and Middle Eastern musical influences and a dance production. Lyrically, it equates the life of a celebrity and stardom with religious oppression and subjugation.

Music critics were divided about the song. Reviewers praised its production and innovative composition but criticized its lyrics, which used the word "burqa" in a sexual manner. "Aura" was first performed live during Gaga's headlining iTunes Festival, and it was used in the trailer for Robert Rodriguez's Machete Kills (in which the singer co-stars). It was also part of the setlist of concert tours ArtRave: The Artpop Ball (2014) and The Mayhem Ball (2025–2026), as well as Gaga's Las Vegas residency, Enigma (2018–2020).

== Background and development ==
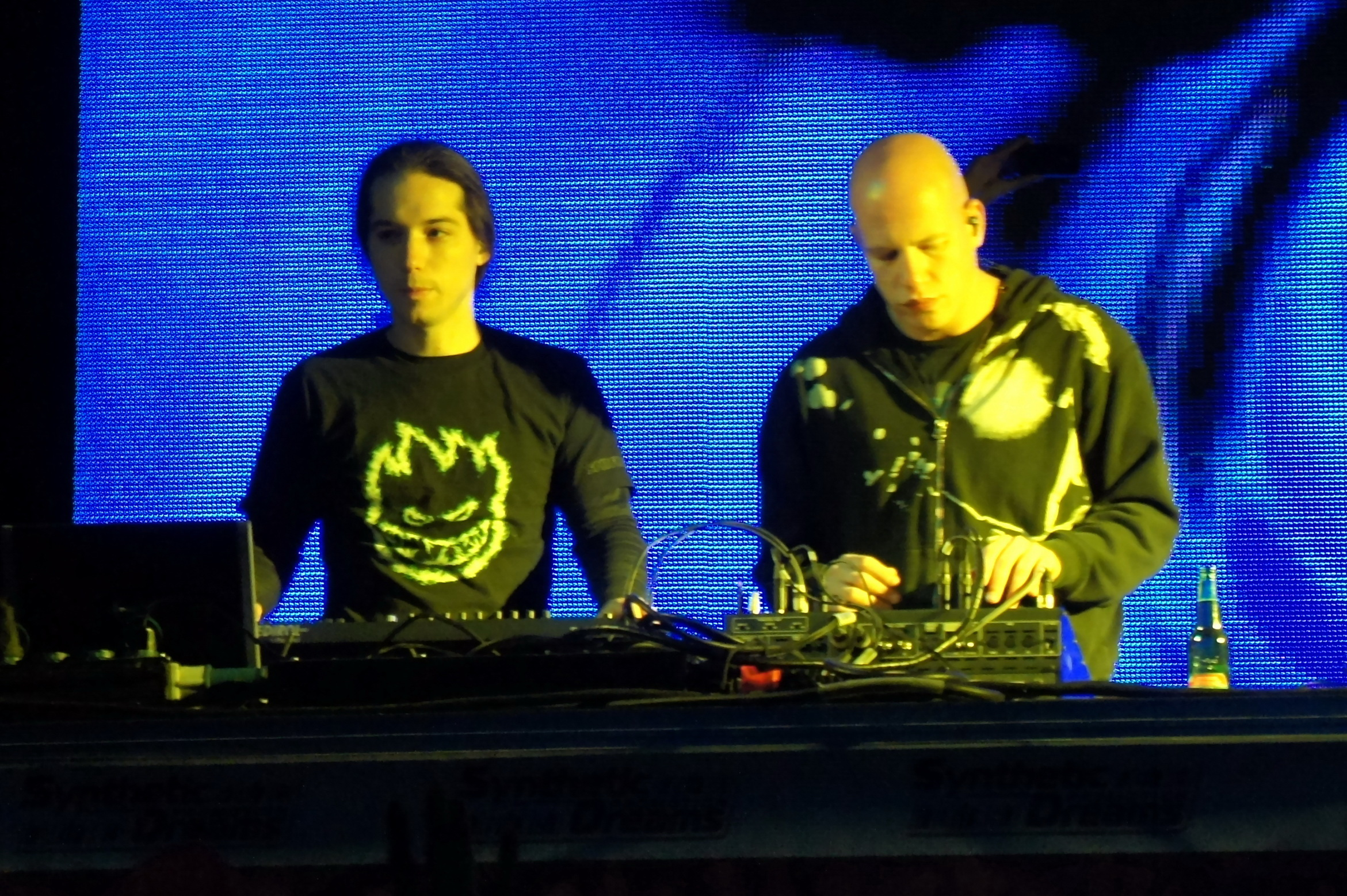
"Aura" was based on a demo by Israeli musicians Infected Mushroom, who later were given co-writer and producer credits on the song.

Development of Gaga's third studio album, Artpop, began shortly after the release of Born This Way (2011); by the following year, its concepts were "beginning to flourish" as Gaga collaborated with producers Fernando Garibay and DJ White Shadow. As the singer embarked on her Born This Way Ball tour, she began collaborating with disc jockey Zedd. In October 2012, when asked by DJ Calvin Harris about her work with Zedd, Gaga sent a cryptic Twitter message: "Were all good [Zedd] miss you buddy been listening to **rq* all day". The abbreviated word was assumed to refer to a song title. About a year later, a demo from Gaga's Artpop sessions leaked with the song, entitled "Burqa"; however, it was presumed to have a two-part title.

The song's real name was revealed as "Aura", originating from a demo by the Israeli psychedelic musical duo Infected Mushroom. In an interview with the Israeli weekly newspaper B'Sheva, the duo detailed the song's conception. Gaga had reportedly visited Zedd's studio while he was working on music with Infected Mushroom. She liked the first demo she heard, which was for "Aura". Zedd later called the duo, saying that Gaga wanted the song for Artpop. They deliberated for some time, torn between maintaining their artistic integrity by not collaborating with mainstream artists and the possibility of a "lifelong pension" from the track's royalties. Infected Mushroom decided to give it to Gaga, but wanted to be credited under an alias. The singer was opposed, and wanted the group's real name in the credits. According to Gaga, she wrote the song as an accompaniment to an app being developed for Artpop and it was inspired by her different facets:

So this song is about me basically saying that just because all of those things are there [it] doesn't mean that there is not sort of the same person underneath. And then, also that these veils, they are really just protecting me from the thing that I held the most sacred, which is my creativity ... My Aura is the way that I deal with my insanity and I feel quite insane, so this song sounds very insane ... Everyone thinks that everything I do is a statement but some times I'm just moved by something passionate and I want to express it.

To promote the 2013 American action-comedy film Machete Kills (in which Gaga appeared as La Chameleón), its producers used the song in a commercial and created a lyric video which was uploaded on Vevo and YouTube on October 9, 2013. Due to "Aura"'s streaming activity, the song debuted at number 28 on the US Billboard Dance/Electronic Songs for the week ending October 26, 2013, before the release of Artpop.

== Recording and composition ==
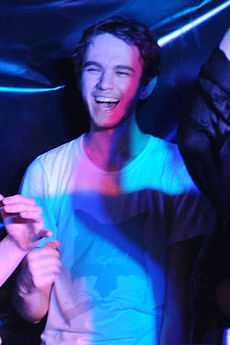
Zedd co-wrote, produced and mixed the track.

After recording began, Zedd was not pleased with the initial songs and suggested that Gaga redo the whole process. Gaga, not content with creating a staple radio hit, wanted to record creatively. Zedd explained to Rolling Stone that they did not "try to make an EDM album—but, at the same time, we didn't try not to make an EDM album. I've done a lot of stuff that's really outside of what I usually do". "Aura" distributes songwriting and production credit among Gaga, Zedd and Infected Mushroom. The song was recorded at Record Plant Studios in Hollywood by Dave Russell, with assistance from Benjamin Rice. Zedd mixed the track at Zeddl, and Ryan Shanahan and Jesse Taub assisted the process. Rick Pearl did additional programming and Gene Grimaldi the audio mastering at Oasis Mastering Studios in Burbank, California. According to Zedd, "Aura" was the most interesting track on Artpop because its combination of oriental music, guitars and an electronic beat enabled it to "cross over" musical genres.

A mariachi and EDM song, "Aura" begins with Gaga's filtered vocal against a Western-style guitar: "I killed my former and left her in the trunk on highway ten", followed by dissonant laughter. As the track reaches a crescendo, Gaga sings its hook: "Do you wanna see me naked, lover? Do you wanna peek underneath the cover? Do you wanna see the girl who lives behind the aura, behind the aura?" against a spare accompaniment. The song, written in common time in the key of F minor, has a tempo of 120 beats per minute. Gaga's vocal ranges from F_{3} to E♭_{5}, and the track has a basic F–G♭–F–G♭–E♭m_{7}–F chord progression. Described by Michael Cragg of the Guardian as a "slightly muddled insight into gender politics", "Aura" ends abruptly with Gaga uttering the words "Dance. Sex. Art. Pop. Tech".

According to James Montgomery of MTV News, "Aura"'s lyrics equate celebrity and stardom with religious oppression and subjugation. The beginning of the song, implying that the singer destroyed her old self to become Gaga the artist, examines the loss of a private life and constant media scrutiny (noting that they are by choice). The track's central metaphor is a burqa as a "veil of fame", sexualizing it with the line "Do you wanna see me naked, lover?" Montgomery said that criticism of Gaga's use of the word "burqa" is countered in the lyrics, when she sings "Enigma popstar is fun, she wears burqa for fashion". "Aura" expresses Gaga's solidarity with what she considers her sisterhood.

== Critical reception ==
Music critics were divided in their reviews of "Aura". Sal Cinquemani of Slant Magazine gave the song a positive review, preferring it to the album's lead single ("Applause"); "Aura" is "everything we've come to expect from Gaga: messy, self-absorbed, overly ambitious, and downright weird—while still being undeniably infectious". According to Jason Lipshutz of Billboard, the track positioned the album as a whole "with ambitious ideas and breakneck electronic passages". Three years later, in another Billboard article ("Lady Gaga's Top 10 Most Daring Songs"), Dan Weiss called "Aura" the singer's "boldest moment particularly as an album opener ... [It's] a dizzying roller coaster ride of a tune and its presumed intent—to get inside the head of a woman from a completely different walk of life and find a kindred spirit in sexual repression—is not without merit". Helen Brown of The Daily Telegraph called "Aura" the most interesting track on Artpop, commending its Middle-Eastern production, Gaga's characteristically repeated syllables and the song's "clever sonic shapeshifting". In his detailed review of the song, Mike Diver of Clash magazine wrote:

"Aura", this set's opener, manages to be a multitude of songs at once, jumping from nosebleed bass to (Middle) Eastern-coloured tones, a Spaghetti Western monologue to a stars-bound middle-eight, from quite-deliberately provocative talk of slavery and the meaning of the burqa to mindless cosmic love waffle. "Do you want to see the girl who lives behind the aura?" Lady Gaga asks us. Sure. A little of the real would go a long way after the smoke and mirrors defining her career to date.

Umema Aimem of The Washington Post criticized the lyrics: "The song actually started out well ... but then you lost me when you proceeded to turn such a sacred symbol of [Islam] into an exotic costume". Mark Hogan of Spin called it "a grasping EDM mess" and "all over the place"; he disliked the burqa lyrics, "along with plenty of moments that bring to mind all the 'blog house' producers following in the path of Crystal Castles or Simian Mobile Disco circa 2007". Max Kessler of Paper gave "Aura" a lukewarm review; the song had "all the classic Gaga attributes", including "controversial and mildly clever lyrics set to a throbbing, almost-grating dance beat that's at times great and at times horrible". Its lyrics were controversial, with some Muslims accusing Gaga of degrading the burqa by sexualizing it.

== Live performances ==
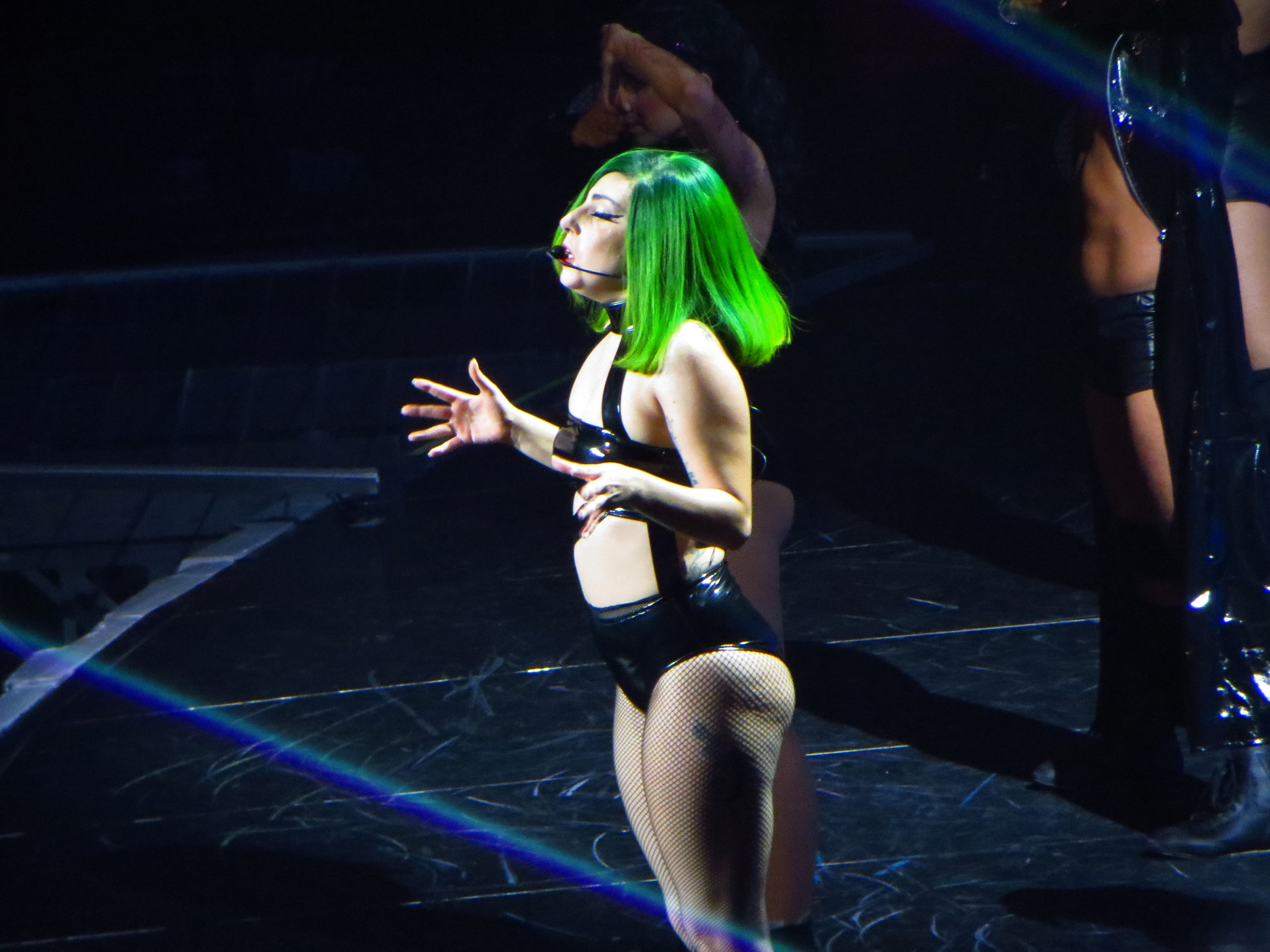
Gaga performing "Aura" during ArtRave: The Artpop Ball tour in 2014

On September 1, 2013, Gaga opened the 2013 iTunes Festival at Roundhouse in London, performing several songs from Artpop. She opened the show with "Aura", wearing a black suit with a black scarf and a knife that read "HOLLYWOOD" (referring to the song's lyrics). During her performance, the singer was hoisted above the crowd in a metal cage described by the BBC as a "medieval torture device". Ashley Percival of the Huffington Post wrote about the show, "Arriving onstage a fashionable 26 minutes late, Gaga opened with previously leaked track 'Aura', which sounded more pulsating and crazed than the unfinished demo ... She belted out from a cage suspended above the audience, her lyrics setting the tone for the rest of her set." Gaga performed "Aura" next at (Le) Poisson Rouge in New York City, where she held a fête for V magazine editor Stephen Gan. She played a 45-minute set, wearing a seashell bra and thong. According to David Lipke of Women's Wear Daily, Gaga lip-synced the song.

On November 8, 2013, Gaga appeared in ArtRave at the Brooklyn Navy Yard to promote Artpop. She performed a number of songs from the album, opening with "Aura" in a clown-like white mask and white-and-black buoy-like attachments which were described by Andrew Hampp of Billboard as reminiscent of a Jack in the Box mascot. The singer's dress was compared to the Michelin Man by Marissa G. Muller of Rolling Stone, "complete with white water wings, a mask, and a pointed cap". Gaga began the performance across the room, weaving through the crowd towards a Jeff Koons sculpture of herself as she sang.

The singer sang "Aura" and other songs from her discography at the 2013 Jingle Bell Ball on December 8, 2013. At the 2014 South by Southwest (SXSW), Gaga wore knee-length blonde dreadlocks and opened her set with "Aura". She was rotating on a barbecue spit for the performance. The song was regularly performed as part of Gaga's 2014 ArtRave: The Artpop Ball concert tour (after "Judas"), with the singer in a green bob cut wig and leather hot pants.

"Aura" was performed on Gaga's 2018–2020 Las Vegas residency show, Enigma. Brittany Spanos from Rolling Stone wrote that the track "begins a darker, more dangerous chapter of journey" in the narrative of the show, although she thought that the song was "oddly included" on the setlist. Gaga performed "Aura" at The Mayhem Ball tour (2025–2026), as a shortened snippet in a medley with "Judas". Tomás Mier of Rolling Stone viewed it as a reference to fans who had asked for her to perform "tracks from what they consider her most overlooked album".

== Credits and personnel ==
Credits adapted from the liner notes of Artpop.

=== Management ===
- Recorded at Record Plant Studios, Hollywood, California
- Mastered at Oasis Mastering Studios, Burbank, California
- Stefani Germanotta P/K/A Lady Gaga (BMI) Sony ATV Songs LLC/House of Gaga Publishing, LLC/GloJoe Music Inc. (BMI)
- Zedd Music Empire (ASCAP), All rights administered by Kobalt Songs Music Publishing.
- Wixen Music Publishing, Inc. as agent for Infected Mushroom Publishing (ASCAP)

=== Personnel ===
- Lady Gaga – songwriter, lead vocals, producer
- Zedd – songwriter, producer, mixing
- Infected Mushroom – songwriter, producer
- Dave Russell – recording
- Benjamin Rice – recording assistant
- Rick Pearl – additional programming
- Ryan Shanahan – assistant
- Jesse Taub – assistant
- Ivy Skoff – union contract administrator
- Gene Grimaldi – mastering

== Charts ==
Weekly chart performance for "Aura"
Charts (2013)	Peak position
South Korea International (Gaon)	60
US Hot Dance/Electronic Songs (Billboard)	14
