= Dope (Lady Gaga song) =

Promotional single by Lady Gaga

from the album Artpop
- Released: November 4, 2013
- Studio: Shangri-La (Malibu); CRC (Chicago)
- Genre: Electronic rock
- Length: 3:41
- Label: Streamline; Interscope
- Songwriters: Lady Gaga; Paul "DJ White Shadow" Blair; Nick Monson; Dino Zisis
- Producers: Rick Rubin; Lady Gaga

Audio video
- "Dope" on YouTube

"Dope" is a song recorded by American singer Lady Gaga for her third studio album, Artpop (2013). It was released on November 4, 2013, by Interscope Records as the second promotional single from the record, following "Venus". It was written by Gaga, Paul "DJ White Shadow" Blair, Dino Zisis, and Nick Monson and produced by Gaga and Rick Rubin. Following her hip surgery and cancellation of the Born This Way Ball tour, Gaga became addicted to drugs, which helped her get relief from the pain of surgery and also to cope with her sabbatical. "Dope" was written about this addiction and evolved from a song she had previously composed for her fans, about her confessions. It was added to Artpop because Gaga felt the album needed something more autobiographical.

The song received mixed reviews, with some critics complimenting its simple production and vocals, and others labelling the lyrics inept. An electronic rock lament, in the vein of Irish folk ballad rue, "Dope" is a bittersweet song centered on a dark theme. It has a minimal production and is only composed off Gaga's vocals sung in an intoxicated slur. Lyrically it talks about substance abuse and the yearning for a long lost love. Prior to the release, Gaga uploaded an image of herself on Instagram, wearing a snapback featuring the word DOPE. She also posted the song's lyrics there, triggering the social media website's concern. The artwork featured Gaga with a big blazer, her face covered with a hat and a grill that made her teeth appear larger. Media outlets found the picture to be "odd" and compared it to different horror films.

Gaga performed the song at the 2013 YouTube Music Awards, and later on all dates of her residency, Lady Gaga Live at Roseland Ballroom, and her ArtRave: The Artpop Ball tour (2014). After its release, "Dope" reached the top of the music charts in Hungary and Spain, while attaining top-ten positions in Belgium, France, Greece, Italy and Luxembourg. The streams from the YouTube Music Awards performance helped the song become Gaga's 13th top-ten on the Billboard Hot 100 reaching number eight, as well as her highest charting promotional single to date.

== Background and writing ==
After Gaga suffered a labral tear of her right hip in February 2013 during her Born This Way Ball tour, which she had embarked to promote her second studio album, Born This Way (2011), she cancelled the remainder of the tour and underwent surgery. She subsequently had to be on rest for the next six months. The singer later told Attitude magazine that she had a serious marijuana addiction during that time in order to bear the pain of the surgery. "I would break the habit and it would sneak back in, and I would break it and sneak back in," Gaga confessed, adding that her life had become a smoke-filled cycle: sleep, sing, smoke. Having cancelled the tour and taken a sabbatical, Gaga started working on the songs for Artpop.

"I was just numbing, numbing, numbing myself then sleeping it off, then getting on stage, killing it in pain, then getting off and smoking, smoking, smoking, not knowing what pain was. Fuck, if I know what hurts the most, you know? I would break the habit and it would sneak back in and I would break it and sneak back in."

—Gaga talking about her addiction to drugs.

Following her comeback with lead single "Applause" from the album, Gaga performed few songs from the record at the iTunes Festival in London in September 2013. One of the songs, known as "I Wanna Be with You", was performed as an acoustic version on the festival; Gaga called it an ode to her fans and about how much she had missed them while recuperating from the surgery. The song, later reworked into "Dope", was written by Gaga, Paul "DJ White Shadow" Blair, Dino Zisis and Nick Monson and produced by Gaga and Rick Rubin. Described by Gaga as an electronic ballad, it was revealed to be "the evolution of a fan song that became a deep confession in me." In an interview with Kiss FM (UK) Gaga said that "Dope" was the most personal song she had ever created. Feeling that the album needed something more autobiographical and confessional and a song which would show her vulnerable side, Gaga worked with Rubin who let her do the song in the way she wanted and just assisted in recording it. He had contacted Gaga for producing the track, while she was on her sabbatical; Gaga consulted with Paul "DJ White Shadow" Blair, her main producer for Artpop and then decided to enlist Rubin's help. "'Dope' is actually about me battling all sorts of addiction since I was growing up", she explained to the interviewers.

== Recording and composition ==
"Dope" (2013)
A 22 second sample of "Dope", where Gaga sings over a piano melody, in a minimal production. Her intoxicated, slur-like vocals are heard singing the lines, "I promise this drink is my last one / I know I fucked up again / Because I lost my only friend"

"Dope" was recorded at Shangri-La Studios, Malibu, California, by Jason Lader, Ryan Hewitt and Sean Oakley, with Lader also working on the digital editing of the song and playing keyboards for it. Bill Malina completed the additional recording for the track at CRC Recording Studios, Chicago, Illinois with Steve Faye. The mixing for "Dope" was performed by Manny Marroquin at Larrabee Sound Studios, North Hollywood, California, with assistance from Chris Galland and Delbert Bowers, additional mixing being done by Andrew Scheps at Punker-Pad Mobile Studios. Other instrumentation for "Dope" included piano by Gaga and Adam MacDougall at keyboards. Finally, Gene Grimaldi did the audio mastering at Oasis Mastering Studios in Burbank, California. According to the sheet music published at Musicnotes.com, "Dope" is set in the time signature of common time, with a moderate tempo of 66 beats per minute. It is composed in the key of E♭ major with Gaga's vocals spanning the tonal nodes of D_{3} to E♭_{5}. The chorus of the song follows a basic sequence of E♭–B♭–Cm–A♭ as its chord progression.

According to Sal Cinquemani from Slant Magazine, "Dope" is an electronic rock lament, in the vein of Irish folk ballad rue. Rolling Stone said that "Dope" reveals a "dark mood" of Gaga as she plays the piano and utters the lyrics. She begins the song with intoxicated, slur-like vocals and the lines, "I promise this drink is my last one / I know I fucked up again / Because I lost my only friend". Amy Sciarretto of PopCrush described "Dope" as a dramatic, piano-driven power ballad, comparing its melody to Gaga's "Hair" (2011) because of its "epic and contemplative nature". She also likened its combination of piano, powerful vocals and lyrics to Rihanna's "Stay" (2013). There is not much instrumentation accompanying the singer's vocals, except for piano sounds and distant synths, making Gaga's singing the focal point of "Dope". In order to give the production an intimate feeling and make it emotional, Rubin did not apply any pitch correction to Gaga's vocals, as noted by Jon Pareles from The New York Times.

The lyrics talk about substance abuse and the yearning for a long lost love more than drugs. "Just one last puff and two last regrets/Three spirits and 12 lonely steps", Gaga sings, before uttering the hook, "I need you more than dope". "Dope" is one of the most personal songs of Gaga, according to Joe Lynch from Fuse. With lines like "I promise this drink is my last one / I know I fucked up again / Because I lost my only friend", Lynch believed that Gaga was referring to her former assistant Jennifer O'Neil who had months ago moved to court against the singer for unpaid wages.

== Release and artwork ==
Gaga was seen wearing a snapback with the above NASA logo, altered to read DOPE instead. She wore the cap during the performance of the song also.

Gaga had posted two handwritten notes of the lyrics to "Dope" on social media site Instagram. The verses, then believed to be from the song, included references to drug intake with lines such as "Been hurtin' low from living high, Toast one last puff and two last regrets" and "each day I cry, I feel so low, from living high", along with the hashtag #DOPE. The images raised concern from Instagram who felt that Gaga needed help and decided to reach out to her. They mailed the singer with the following message: "Hi, Members of the Instagram community have raised concern for your well-being after seeing posts you've shared. We're reaching out to provide you with some important safety information." Gaga mockingly responded to the letter and was dismissive of their concern; she posted on her Twitter account about the mail from the social media. Following the release of the full track list for Artpop, Gaga posted an image of herself on Instagram, wearing a snapback hat, emblazoned with the NASA "meatball" insignia, but replacing the word NASA with DOPE, referring to the design label with the same name.

On October 31, 2013, Gaga revealed via Twitter that "Dope" would be the final song available for purchase before the release of Artpop, accessible for digital download from November 4. The single's cover art was also revealed, depicting Gaga wearing a black floppy hat with her brunette hair falling over her shoulders, an oversized "boxy" double-breasted blazer, sheer underwear, one black leather boot and a grill that made her teeth appear larger. Her eyes are covered by a scarf and she has bruises on her belly and around her crotch area. John Walker from MTV News compared the cover to director Tim Burton's works and called it "terrifying". He described Gaga's face and the grills as "[resembling] the gum-less teeth of a long-buried skull cast in titanium" and believed that the hands and legs were prosthetic. Walker concluded by saying that the cover reminded him of a "bizarro world" version of singer Janet Jackson's infamous shot for a 1993 Rolling Stone issue. Lily Harrison from E! Online complimented Gaga for taking the fashion of grills to a "whole new level". She further commended her ability to portray her toned figure in spite of the "odd ensemble". Fashion website Refinery29's Leila Brillson felt that the artwork was more of a surrealist move which made Gaga look like a "nightmarish" version of virtual band Gorillaz. Brillson was also unclear if the bruises were related to the song. Matthew Jacobs from The Huffington Post found the cover relatively modest compared to the previous single covers of songs from Artpop.

== Critical reception ==
Sal Cinquemani from Slant Magazine was initially dismissive of the version performed at the iTunes Festival due to its "bland" arrangement and "elementary" melody, but reacted well to the new version on Artpop, saying: "Gaga has been very public about her supposed battle with addiction, and whether or not it's just another costume for the singer to wear, she's nonetheless composed a convincing anthem of remorse." Michael Cragg from The Guardian, who was granted an early listen to Artpop, felt that the song was an emotional highlight of the album, denoting it as the record's "one real moment of calm" and "the album's most tender moment". However, Cragg was skeptical about the line "I need you more than dope", feeling it to be a less impressive comparison. Adam White of The Independent described "Dope" as "undeniably moving", though he felt it was not a song listeners would necessarily return to more than once. Jon Pareles from The New York Times found "Dope" to be similar to piano ballads by singer Elton John.

Alex Young from Consequence of Sound praised Gaga's vocals and deemed the track "easily the best track to surface from Artpop thus far". Jason Lipshutz from Billboard called the song a "Broadway show-stopper", adding that Gaga's broken vocals are brilliant and bruising. Jim Farber from New York Daily News felt the song expressed "great need in the lyrics while displaying only bravado in her delivery." Kory Grow of Rolling Stone felt that the emotional high point of "Dope" is its chorus, and is a turning point for the song. Leila Brilson from Refinery29 felt that with "Dope" Gaga allowed her "operatic voice" to soar; the song itself is a heart-aching ballad and an unforgettable moment on Artpop. This view was shared by Spencer Kornhaber from The Atlantic who added that the song was "a histrionic piano ballad".

Bradley Stern from MuuMuse found the "wailing piano ballad" to be among the weakest tracks from Artpop. While reviewing Artpop, Jerry Shriver from USA Today commented that amongst the loud music of the other songs, "Dope" sounded like "too much of a slog" to provide any change of pace while listening to the record. London Evening Standard's John Aizlewood criticized the song's lyrics for being submissive, instead of Gaga's empowerment themes. Another negative review came from Chris Bosman from Time, saying that although "Dope" was the most "streamlined" release of Gaga's discography, "the effect would be more powerful if 'Dope' didn't hit every excruciating piano ballad cliché (and feature the hilariously clunky line 'I need you more than dope')."

== Commercial performance ==
"Dope" debuted at number 60 on the US Hot Digital Songs chart with 31,000 downloads for the issue dated November 23, 2013. The song also debuted at number eight on the Billboard Hot 100, becoming the singer's 13th top ten on the chart, as well as her highest charting promotional single to date. The low sales of "Dope" were due to iTunes Store's "Complete My Album" program, where the customers have the option of buying the full album and hence earlier song purchases are deducted from the song's current week's total. Despite the low sales, the high debut was fueled by the heavy streams of the song of about 8.2 million, and a number one entry on the Billboard Streaming Songs chart, which is one of the components of the Hot 100. About 95% of the online streams came from YouTube views of the live video of Gaga performing "Dope" at the YouTube Music Awards of 2013. Dating to her first top ten single, "Just Dance" on the issue of December 6, 2008, Gaga's total of 13 top ten songs in that time frame is preceded by Taylor Swift, with 14 songs to her tally, followed by Bruno Mars and Katy Perry with 11 songs each. The next week, "Dope" tumbled down the Hot 100 to number 71.

"Dope" debuted at number 34 on the Australian Singles Chart for the issue dated November 9, 2013. In New Zealand, "Dope" debuted at number 20 on the New Zealand Singles Chart, for the week of November 11, 2013, and on the Irish Singles Chart the song entered at number 12. Following the release of Artpop, "Dope" also debuted on the UK Singles Chart at number 124 with sales of 1,666 copies. It has sold 10,218 digital downloads in South Korea, as reported by Gaon. "Dope"'s highest position was attained in Hungary and Spain, where it reached the top of the charts. It also attained top-ten positions in Belgium, France, Greece, Italy and Luxembourg.

== Live performances ==
Gaga performed the song at the 2013 YouTube Music Awards on November 3, 2013. She arrived on the red carpet of the event wearing the same pair of rotten, yellow teeth she wore on the cover art. John Walker from MTV News analyzed Gaga's look to be a combination of the snake from Tim Burton's 1988 fantasy film, Beetlejuice, the Scarecrow character from DC Comics and the rocker Marilyn Manson. During the performance, the singer wore a flannel shirt, her natural hair and a snapback with the NASA symbol altered to read DOPE and her face was devoid of any make-up. She performed a piano only version of "Dope", without any other instrumentation and with tears falling down her face. Gaga exited the stage while shaking hands and hugging the members of the audience.

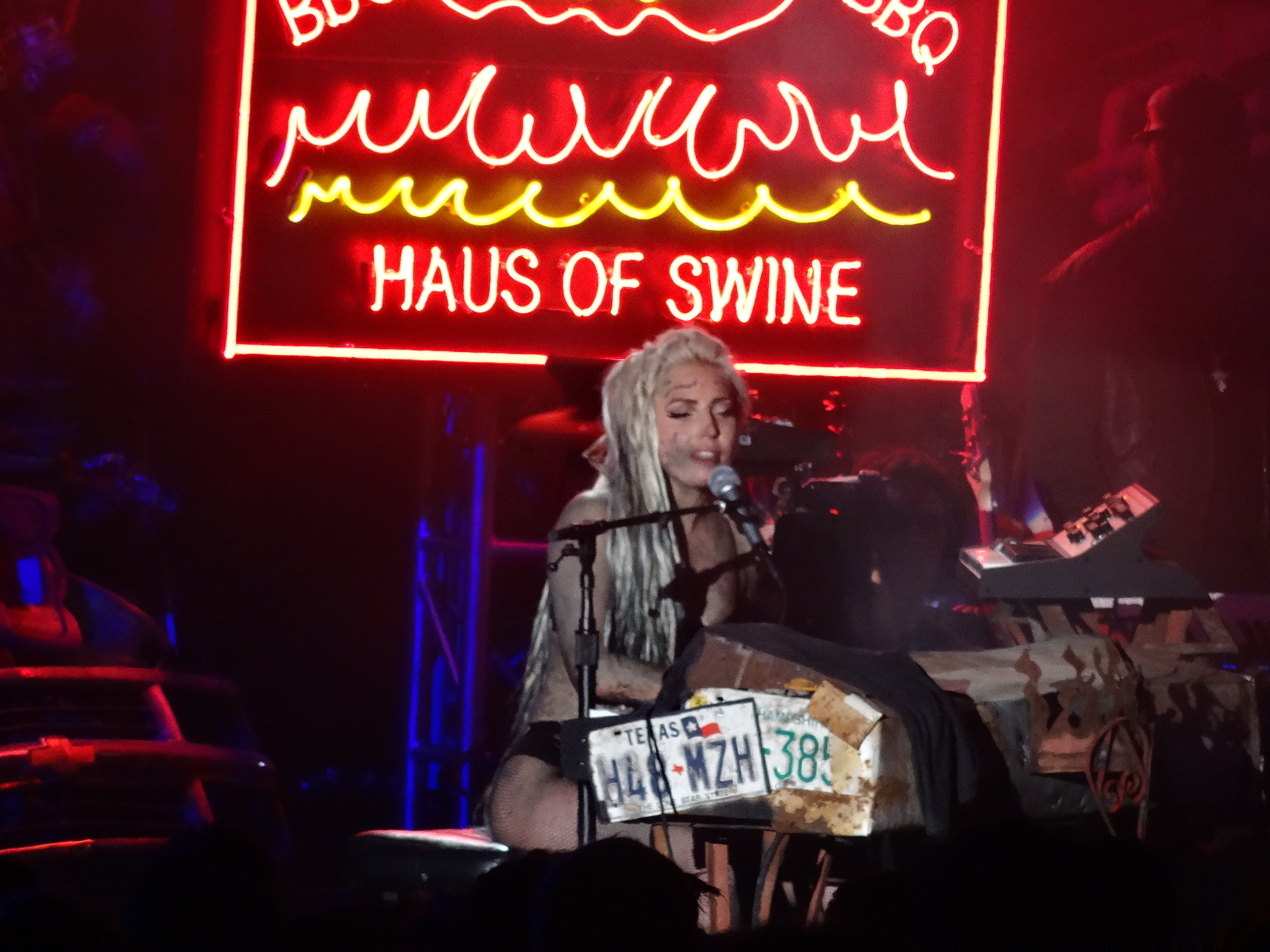
Lady Gaga performing "Dope" at South by Southwest (SXSW), 2014

Gil Kaufman from MTV News found the performance to be pensive, saying that "leave it to Lady Gaga to go completely the other direction [than the tone of the show]". Jon Caramanica from The New York Times complimented Gaga's "easiest-to-consume" performance for being "taut and focused" without any error in its execution. A review in Spin called it one of the most bare performances of the show. Conversely, Jason Lipshutz from Billboard was critical of the performance, feeling that it "failed to be the emotional stunner it desperately deserved to be". He believed that although directors Spike Jonze and Chris Milk kept the focus on Gaga's tear-stricken face to give it an intimate feel, the screaming of the audience ruined the performance.

In November 2013, Gaga hosted a two-day event called ArtRave, which served as the launch party of Artpop, and performed "Dope" on the piano. Before the performance, Gaga spoke about her struggles with drugs and alcohol and expressed her determination to create music without relying on either. Days later, Gaga appeared on The Howard Stern Show and performed another piano-only version of the song. On December 6, 2013, Gaga performed both "Dope" and an acoustic rendition of Artpop's second single "Do What U Want" on Alan Carr: Chatty Man. In March 2014, she performed the song at South by Southwest (SXSW), while sporting fake blond dreadlocks.

"Dope" was later added to the setlist of the singer's residency show, Lady Gaga Live at Roseland Ballroom. The performance took place on a piano placed on a side-stage, in a setting reminiscent of New York City's Lower East Side, complete with "neon letters that spelled '176 Stanton Street,' the address of Gaga’s former apartment." During her 2014 world tour, ArtRave: The Artpop Ball, Gaga performed "Dope" on a piano hidden inside a plastic mountain of icy crystals. Before the performance, she dedicated "Dope" to “people with addictions or mental stresses”.

== Credits and personnel ==
Credits adapted from the liner notes of Artpop.

=== Management ===
- Recorded at Shangri-La Studios, Malibu, California and CRC Recording Studios, Chicago, Illinois
- Stefani Germanotta P/K/A Lady Gaga (BMI) Sony ATV Songs LLC / Haus of Gaga Publishing, LLC / GloJoe Music Inc. (BMI), Maxwell and Carter Publishing, LLC (ASCAP)

=== Personnel ===
- Lady Gaga – songwriter, lead vocals, producer, piano
- Rick Rubin – producer
- Paul "DJ White Shadow" Blair – songwriter
- Nick Monson – songwriter
- Dino Zisis – songwriter
- Jason Lader – recording, digital editing, keyboards
- Ryan Hewitt – recording
- Sean Oakley – recording
- Eric Lynn – recording assistant
- Joshua Smith – recording assistant
- Dave "Squirrel" Covell – recording assistant
- Bill Malina – additional recording
- Steve Faye – recording assistant
- Manny Marroquin – mixing at Larrabee Sound Studios, North Hollywood, California
- Chris Galland – mixing assistant
- Delbert Bowers – mixing assistant
- Andrew Scheps – additional mixing at Punker-Pad Mobile
- Adam MacDougall – keyboards
- Ivy Skoff – union contract administrator
- Gene Grimaldi – audio mastering at Oasis Mastering Studios in Burbank, California

== Charts ==
Weekly chart performance for "Dope"
Charts (2013)	Peak position
Australia (ARIA)	34
Austria (Ö3 Austria Top 40)	28
Belgium (Ultratop 50 Flanders)	18
Belgium (Ultratop 50 Wallonia)	5
Canada Hot 100 (Billboard)	96
Denmark (Tracklisten)	28
Finland Download (Latauslista)	3
France (SNEP)	8
Germany (GfK)	34
Greece Digital Songs (Billboard)	2
Hungary (Single Top 40)	1
Ireland (IRMA)	12
Italy (FIMI)	5
Luxembourg Digital Song Sales (Billboard)	9
Netherlands (Single Top 100)	30
New Zealand (Recorded Music NZ)	20
Portugal Digital Song Sales (Billboard)	8
South Korea International (Gaon)	22
Spain (Promusicae)	1
Switzerland (Schweizer Hitparade)	15
UK Singles (Official Charts Company)	124
US Billboard Hot 100	8

== See also ==
- List of Billboard Hot 100 top 10 singles in 2013
- List of number-one Billboard Streaming Songs of 2013
- List of number-one singles of 2013 (Spain)
- List of top 10 singles in 2013 (France)
- Rick Rubin production discography
