= Benjamin Rollins Caldwell =

American artist

Benjamin Rollins Caldwell (born September 12, 1983) is an American artist best known for his one-of-a kind pieces and custom projects that use everyday objects and materials to create unique pieces of furniture. He lives in Inman, South Carolina and owns a studio called BRC Designs.

Benjamin gained notoriety in 2013 for his Binary Collection that debuted at Lady Gaga’s artRave alongside artists Jeff Koons and Marina Abramović. Haus of Gaga has used Benjamin Rollins Caldwell's Binary Chair as part of Lady Gaga's marketing efforts for her ArtPop album tour. Lady Gaga uses the Binary Chair as a symbol of the singer's campaign for a collision of the art pop-music worlds. The Binary Chair and Lady Gaga first appeared on her social media on July 26, 2013. Lady Gaga debuted the chair on the set of Good Morning America in August 2013.

== Early life and education ==
Caldwell was born in Spartanburg, South Carolina to Robert Ervin Caldwell Sr. and Sylvia Rollins Caldwell. The Caldwell's are best known for their candle company, Fresh Scents, Greenleaf, Bridgewater and Votivo, based out of Spartanburg, South Carolina.

Caldwell attended Westmont College in Santa Barbara, CA where he doubled majored in Studio Art and Business. It was at Westmont College that Caldwell's life was forever changed. Benjamin enrolled in a sculpture class his senior year that changed the way he saw artwork and made him see the world 3 dimensionally.

After graduation from Westmont in 2006, Benjamin returned home to Spartanburg, South Carolina where he became the Brand Manager for Votivo Candles. He spent much of his free time painting commission portraits and working on Interior Design projects for clientele. It was in his free time that Caldwell began making installation furniture for his Interior Design projects. In the fall of 2008, Benjamin quit his job at Votivo and opened his own studio, BRC Designs in January 2009 where he released his first furniture line.

== Personal life ==
Benjamin Rollins Caldwell married Charlotte Whitaker Filbert in May 2013 in a private ceremony at the Ocean Reef Club in Key Largo, Florida.

== Work ==
Benjamin Rollins Caldwell opened his studio, BRC Designs, in January 2009 in Spartanburg, South Carolina. It was here at BRC Designs, that Ben released his first piece of furniture the suspended Birdseye Bed. Soon followed his first furniture line that included the Dueces Wild Chair, which really put Caldwell into the spotlight. Caldwell showcased his Binary Collection at Design Miami during Art Basel in December 2013.

== Collections ==
Pockets Rug Collection (Spring 2011): Jean pockets are sewn together to form a patchwork rug.

Abc123 (Spring 2011): Composed entirely of children's building blocks, The ABC123 furniture collection was designed with the intention of inspiring children to create and build things out of objects that they are surrounded by.

BALLISTIC Collection (Spring 2011): .22 caliber rounds have been shot randomly into the bullet resistant surface of the Ballistic collection pieces creating unique explosive patterns. At first glance the pieces appear to be a surrealistic representation of a school of jellyfish but upon closer inspection one will notice the metal shots radiating from the bullet's point of impact. Composed entirely of 1.25” level 3 bullet resistant laminate acrylic. The Ballistic Chair is outfitted with Kevlar seat cushions.

BINARY Collection (Spring/Fall 2011): Inspired by pallets of obsolete computers and electronics that were collecting dust in a local warehouse. The understructure of each piece in the Binary Collection is made from the metal from computer towers and from printers that are riveted together and bent to the proper form. The surface is completely covered with a collage of motherboards, computer chips, LED screens and hard drive disks held in place by sheet metal screws. The glass from the table was salvaged from an abandoned warehouse. The seats of the chairs are made from Ethernet and ribbon cables which have been woven together.

The American Pipe Dream (Spring 2012): With copper prices at an all-time high, theft of copper has become a growing problem. Caldwell became frustrated after a thief stripped the copper out of one of his welding machines; completely destroying the expensive machine for a couple dollars' worth of copper, most likely for the thief's next drug fix. The American Pipe Dream Collection is a response to these crimes. Composed of half-inch copper piping, which has been soldered together in a maze-like method inspired by the windows computer pipe screen savor.

CAPPED OUT (Fall 2012): Thousands of colorful repurposed Soda Bottle Caps are attached together using zips ties to a powder-coated steel form, to create the shapes of the Capped Out pieces. Six evenly spaced holes are drilled into each soda cap, then a zip tie is threaded through the holes, connecting each soda cap together. The steel understructure of each piece in the collection is composed of 98% recycled steel content, finished with an applied powder coating.

CELEBRATION (Fall 2012): The Celebration Collection is composed entirely of plastic trophy topper figurines affixed together at various points using small screws. The collection is meant to signify the importance of unity and bond between people.
