= Venus (Lady Gaga song) =

- One of the three covers accompanying the digital release.

Promotional single by Lady Gaga

from the album Artpop
- Released: October 27, 2013
- Recorded: 2013
- Studio: Record Plant (Hollywood); CRC (Chicago)
- Genre: Synth-pop; dance-pop; glam rock
- Length: 3:54
- Label: Streamline; Interscope
- Songwriters: Lady Gaga; Paul "DJ White Shadow" Blair; Hugo Leclercq; Dino Zisis; Nick Monson; Sun Ra
- Producer: Lady Gaga

Audio video
- "Venus" on YouTube

"Venus" is a song recorded and produced by American singer Lady Gaga for her third studio album, Artpop (2013). It was written by Gaga, Paul "DJ White Shadow" Blair, Madeon, Dino Zisis, Nick Monson, and Sun Ra. The recording includes a sample from the French electropop duo Zombie Zombie's cover of Sun Ra's song "Rocket Number 9", from his studio album, Interstellar Low Ways (1966); Sun Ra received a co-writing credit on the track. Originally intended to be the second single from the album, it was released as the first promotional single from Artpop on October 27, 2013, to the iTunes Store, following the positive reception of "Do What U Want", which was planned to be a promotional single only.

"Venus" is a 1980s-inspired synth-pop, dance-pop and glam rock song with four hooks, and references Sandro Botticelli's painting The Birth of Venus. Gaga worked on the song with Madeon and was inspired by a number of things, chief among them were: Venus, the Roman goddess of love, the eponymous planet, and sexual intercourse. Lyrically it also name-checks the planets in the Solar System. Three accompanying artworks were designed for the single by Steven Klein, including one with a scorpion attached to Gaga's head, a picture of a dead bat, and a third showing her standing naked with an open clam shell superimposed above her shoulder and covering her lower face. A music video was initially conceived for the song, but never materialized. The track was later used during a sequence in the music video for Artpop's third single, "G.U.Y." instead.

Upon its release, "Venus" received mixed reviews from music critics. They called the song catchy, but had mixed feelings towards the lyrics, and preferred the previously released "Do What U Want". It achieved moderate success on charts around the world, reaching the top of the charts in Hungary and Spain, and the top ten in seven additional countries. The song debuted and peaked at number 32 on the US Billboard Hot 100. Gaga performed the track on the tenth series of British The X Factor, along with a suggestive performance of "Do What U Want", which prompted complaints to the broadcaster and British media regulator, Ofcom. Other notable performances occurred at The Graham Norton Show, Gaga's ArtRave promotional event, and the ArtRave: The Artpop Ball tour in 2014.

== Background and development ==
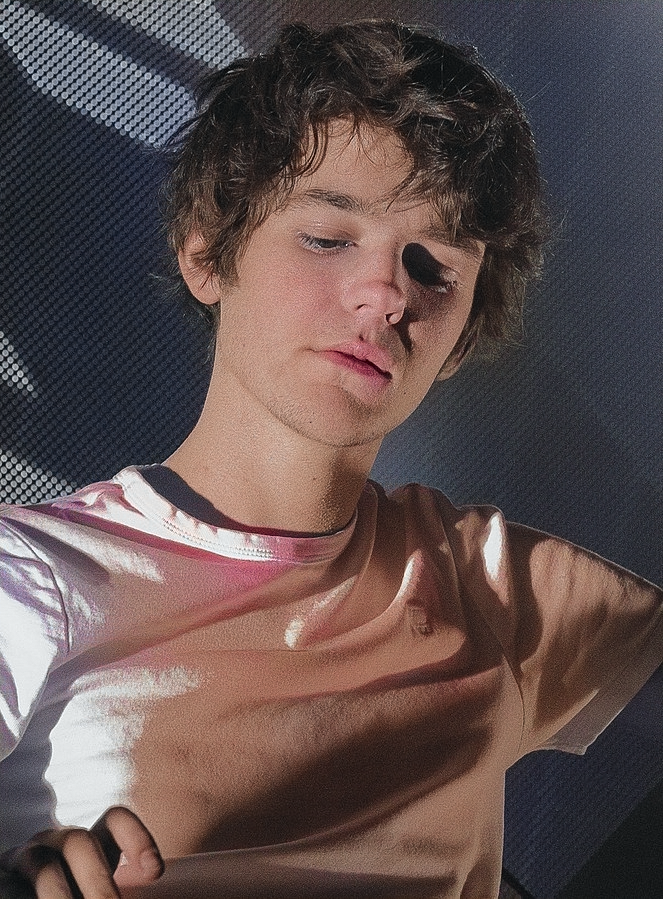
Madeon co-wrote "Venus" with Gaga and the other songwriters.

Development of Gaga's third studio album, Artpop, began shortly after the release of her second record, Born This Way (2011), and by the following year, the album's concepts were "beginning to flourish" as Gaga collaborated with producers Fernando Garibay and DJ White Shadow. In the meantime, the singer also worked with French disc jockey Madeon. This was his first experience collaborating with a vocalist face-to-face. On MTV News he clarified that he had "always wanted to work with pop artists and my #1 on my list was Lady Gaga. So when I had the opportunity to do that, I was really thrilled." Having mutual respect for each other's work, Gaga praised Madeon's production skills, saying, "He is so amazing. He has such an understanding of music at such a young age. He reminds me of myself so much. He's obsessed, so obsessed with music."

Madeon was associated with co-writing and co-producing three songs on Artpop—"Venus", "Mary Jane Holland" and "Gypsy". During her interview with SiriusXM radio, Gaga confirmed that "Venus" was the first song developed for Artpop and it set the mood and tone for the rest of the album to follow. Gaga produced the track entirely by herself with some co-producing contributions from Madeon. Among the inspirations behind the track were: Venus, the Roman goddess of love, the eponymous planet, and sexual intercourse. A further explanation was provided by the singer:

"So, this song is about faith, but it's also about finding faith in other places, in the beyond, and my experience with love being something that took me up a really long time to find. So it's really psychedelic and it really takes you on a journey [...] I kinda got this lot of different inspiration from this sort of futuristic disco meets late 70's and jazz and this really really kinda gooey deep groove [...] This song is really about sex, but it's about sex on the most mythological way."

== Recording and composition ==
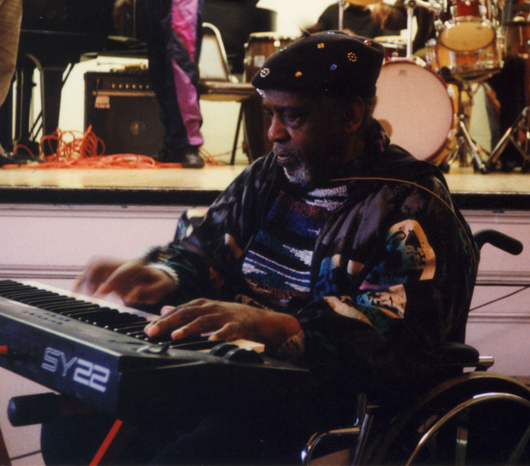
"Venus" samples "Rocket Number 9", released by French duo Zombie Zombie, which itself was a cover of jazz artist Sun Ra's (pictured) "Rocket Number 9 Take Off to the Planet Venus".

Madeon praised Gaga's work ethic during the Born This Way Ball, recalling that she continued recording music after her three-hour concerts and brought the same level of energy to even the earliest demo takes. Madeon's production on Artpop was different from his usual endeavours, and he helped take the mood of the track from being a ballad to being an anthem, but still retaining the sentimental and inspirational aspects of it. "Venus" was written and produced by Gaga, with additional songwriting from DJ White Shadow, Nick Monson and Dino Zisis. The song also includes a sample from the French electropop duo Zombie Zombie's cover of jazz musician Sun Ra's song "Rocket Number 9", from his studio album, Interstellar Low Ways (1966). Sun Ra was thus given a co-writing credit on the track. The chorus' build-up, bridge and drums are heavily influenced by Madeon's unreleased track titled 'Ubelkeit'.

The song was recorded by Dave Russell, Bill Malina and Ghazi Hourani at the Record Plant Studios, with additional recording carried out by Benjamin 'Ben' Rice at CRC Studios. Andrew Robertson and Daniel Zaidenstadt assisted Rice in the recording sessions, while Steve Faye assisted Malina. Gaga did the bass arrangements with Monson, who also worked on the synth arrangement with Madeon and on additional production. Tim Stewart was responsible for the guitars played on "Venus". It was mixed by Manny Marroquin at Larrabee North Studios; further mixing was done by Chris Galland and Delhert Bowers. Gene Grimaldi mastered the track at Oasis Mastering Studios, in Burbank, California.

"Venus" is a synth-pop, dance-pop and glam rock song consisting of four hooks. Gaga's vocal delivery is similar to that of David Bowie in his persona Ziggy Stardust, while the song's structure is reminiscent of Bananarama's 1986 single of the same name. Along with the Bowie-esque verses, there's one hook where the beat drops, then another hook where it starts building up, and finally the chorus is reached. When Bradley Stern from MuuMuse reviewed the single, he described the chorus as "total pop euphoria" with Gaga belting the lyrics, "When you touch me I die just a little inside / I wonder if this could be love!" The song is written in the key of F minor and composed in the time signature of common time, with a tempo of 122 beats per minute. Gaga's vocals range from F_{3} to E♭_{5}, and the track follows a basic sequence of Fm–E♭–Fm–E♭ in the first verse, A♭–E♭–Fm–E♭ in the second hook, Fm–B♭–Fm–B♭ in the third verse, and finally Fm–A♭–E♭–D♭ in the chorus.

According to Jon Pareles of The New York Times, it is a "mutating, episodic dance-floor track, [in which] the singer presents herself as the goddess of love in the 'seashell bikini' painted by Botticelli [in The Birth of Venus]". The lyrics of "Venus" are space-themed, name-checking the planets in the Solar System, with references to the planet's mythical counterpart, Aphrodite, the Greek goddess of love. The extraterrestrial themes drew comparisons to Katy Perry's "E.T." (2011) in the Entertainment Weekly review of the track. John Walker from MTV News noted that "During Gaga's futuristic ballroom emcee moment, where she channels something straight out of Paris Is Burning she utters the line 'Uranus!/ Don't you know my ass is famous!?' That's like, the greatest version of 'Don't You Know Who I Am!?' that we've ever heard."

== Release and artwork ==
Gaga was inspired by Sandro Botticelli's painting The Birth of Venus, which was also featured in the cover art for Artpop.

Gaga announced that "Venus" would be the second single from Artpop through her Twitter account. However, on October 22, 2013, Gaga announced that she would release "Do What U Want" featuring R. Kelly as the second single instead of "Venus", due to the former's overwhelming success on the iTunes Store. "Venus" was released as the first promotional single, with Gaga tweeting, "Don't worry monsters! We are still scheduled to release #Venus this Monday with a snippet on Friday! AND it will STILL have its own video." After two successive previews, the full track was made available for streaming on October 27, 2013, through Vevo and was released for purchase the next day.

Prior to the release, Gaga unveiled three cover artworks, which were photographed by Steven Klein. The first one shows Gaga naked with a scorpion balanced on her head inspired by Serbian performance artist Marina Abramović's Portrait with Scorpion (Closed Eyes). In the second image, the singer stands naked with a kebab in her mouth, while the third shows a dead bat laying flat on its back. A writer for Rap-Up called the artworks "striking", while Metro commented that the covers were only more "photo[s] of Lady Gaga doing something weird." John Walker from MTV News found it difficult to understand the meaning behind the artworks, but nevertheless found them compelling. When the song debuted on YouTube, yet another picture was used to accompany the audio showing Gaga in metallic paint with a scorpion attached to her head.

Gaga had announced that the music video for "Venus" would be directed by filmmaker Ruth Hogben, who previously collaborated with the singer on interludes for The Monster Ball Tour, and photographed her for the October 2013 issue of Elle magazine. However, the music video was never released. A shortened version of the song was later included in the full-length music video for Artpop's third single, "G.U.Y.". It is played as Gaga enters Hearst Castle and is lowered into the Neptune Pool. This is followed by a shot of The Real Housewives of Beverly Hills playing musical instruments while lip-synching the lyrics to "Venus" in matching pink dresses.

== Critical reception ==
Upon its release, "Venus" received mixed reviews from music critics. Shirley Li of Entertainment Weekly was positive in her assessment of the song, describing it as "catchy". Lars Brandle of Billboard gave a positive review, noting its "catchy, radio-friendly chorus." Philip Sherburne wrote in Spin magazine that Artpop gets "a lot artier" with "Venus". Mikael Wood of the Los Angeles Times expressed that its "throbbing disco-glam" groove "feels like a throwback to her 'Just Dance' days", calling it "fun, kind of, but hardly extraordinary." Spencer Kornhaber commented in The Atlantic that with the song packing four separate choruses, it makes the music sound "enormous". John Walker of MTV Buzzworthy called the song "crazy, otherwordly [sic], barely intelligible sense, but still — sense!" Kristen S. Hé of Vulture placed "Venus" within Artpop's science-fiction concept, describing the song as a journey through the Solar System in search of sexual liberation and praising its "unapologetically freaky" approach to pop. Bradley Stern of MuuMuse described "Venus" as "a track just weird and stupid and messy and catchy enough to work." He compared the chorus to that of "Bad Romance" adding that "no matter how weird Gaga gets with her music [...] she'll always bring it back to that undeniably massive pop chorus."

Reviewing Artpop for USA Today, Jerry Shriver recommended "Venus" as one of the tracks audiences should download. Rob Sheffield of Rolling Stone gave the song a rating of 3 stars out of 5, and wrote that Gaga's "space-disco ode to the planet of sex sounds even more like Madonna than you'd expect, especially 'Papa Don't Preach'". Philip Matusavage of MusicOMH called the song an attempt to be "self-consciously epic", but it is a "disjointed mess" instead. Sal Cinquemani wrote in Slant Magazine that the song confirms that the singer knows how to write catchy hooks, but she does not know what to do with them." In a separate review, Alexa Camp of the same magazine, called the song a "tongue-in-cheek album filler" with non-sense lyrics, feeling that "it was a solar system away from smashes" like the singer's previous releases "Telephone" and "Bad Romance". Michael Cragg of The Guardian expressed that "Venus" was not "good enough to support the weight of the clanging metaphors" of the album, describing it as "almost parodical."

== Chart performance ==
In the United States, "Venus" debuted at number 32 on the Billboard Hot 100 with 108,000 digital downloads sold, enabling it to enter the Hot Digital Songs chart at number 12. The song also entered the Hot Dance/Electronic Songs at number 13 on the week of Artpop's release, and was present on the chart for a total of 10 weeks. "Venus" also debuted and peaked at number 19 on the Canadian Hot 100, and was present for one week only. "Venus" performed moderately in Oceania, debuting and peaking at numbers 31 and 20 in Australia and New Zealand, respectively. In South Korea, "Venus" debuted at number four on the Gaon International Downloads Chart with sales of 11,985 copies, and sold 21,016 digital downloads by November 2013.

In the United Kingdom, "Venus" was not allowed to chart when it was first released, since the Official Charts Company only allows independent song releases. Tracks released as part of the album's pre-order are considered to be free downloads by the company and hence barred from charting. Following the official release of Artpop, "Venus" sold 3,174 digital downloads independent of the album, to debut at number 76 on the UK Singles Chart. As of March 2020, the song has gone on to sell 11,200 copies and has been streamed 3.37 million times. In Ireland it debuted and peaked at number 13, while in Scotland it reached number 74. Across Europe, the song reached the top of the charts in Hungary and Spain, top 10 of the download charts in Finland, Greece and Sweden, and top 10 of the main charts in France and Italy. This enabled the track to debut and peak at number seven on the Euro Digital Songs chart.

== Live performances ==
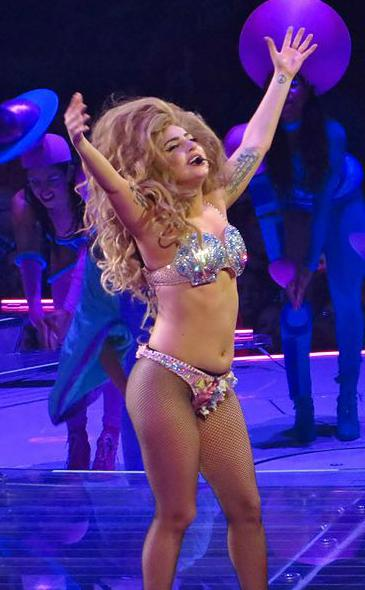
Gaga performing "Venus" on ArtRave: The Artpop Ball tour, wearing the clamshell bikini and large wig

Gaga performed "Venus" for the first time at London's G-A-Y nightclub on the October 26, 2013, stripping naked in the process and provoking a media frenzy. The next day, she performed the song as well as "Do What U Want" on the tenth series of The X Factor (UK), along with a flurry of backup dancers and seashells covering her breasts. At the end of the performance, the singer removed the blond wig she wore and started singing "Do What U Want". ITV, which aired the performance, and the Office of Communications (Offcom), the British media regulator, received roughly 260 complaints regarding the performance because of Gaga's costume and the suggestive lyrics of the track. The show was broadcast before the 9pm watershed. A spokesperson from the channel released a statement saying that they did not believe the performance to be inappropriate. Ofcom said they would assess the complaints and investigate based on their results.

Two weeks later, Gaga performed "Venus" and "Do What U Want" on The Graham Norton Show, which was aired on November 8, 2013. The singer went barefoot for the performance wearing a blond wig and seashell bikini similar to those in her performance on The X Factor. Kirsty McCormack of the Daily Express noted Gaga's look was comparable to the painting The Birth of Venus. "Venus" was next performed at Gaga's ArtRave one-off concert on November 10, 2013, at the Brooklyn Navy Yard, on the main stage adjacent to a Jeff Koons sculpture of the singer. Before starting the performance, Gaga announced to the audience that they were "blasting off to a new dimension" and then stepped onto a rotating three-tiered stage.

During the opening of the Lady Gaga and the Muppets Holiday Spectacular, Gaga performed the track with The Muppets as backup singers. The singer was dressed in nude colored seashell and rhinestone bra and underwear, with her hair coiffed high, and wearing a septum piercing. Gaga also sang the track on the Japanese variety show SMAP×SMAP on November 28, 2013. "Venus" was included on the setlist for the ArtRave: The Artpop Ball tour in 2014. She performed it wearing a mop-top wig and clam-shell bikini, while playing a Gibson Flying V guitar. During the performance, 15 large, inflatable flowers rose up from below on stage. The flowers were inflated using an air hose to create a garden on the stage. According to Rob Sheffield of Rolling Stone, "Gaga did 'Venus' in a clamshell bikini and a wig evoking Raquel Welch in One Million Years B.C., while her dancers wore sad little white costumes that made them look like Woody Allen and Christopher Guest playing sperm cells in Everything You Always Wanted to Know About Sex* (*But Were Afraid to Ask)." In 2017, Gaga performed the song at the Coachella Festival.

== Credits and personnel ==
Credits adapted from the liner notes of Artpop.

=== Management ===
- Recorded at The Record Plant Studios, Hollywood, California and CRC Studios, Chicago, Illinois
- Mixed at Larrabee North Studios, North Hollywood, California and Popcultur Studios, Paris, France
- Mastered at Oasis Mastering Studios, Burbank, California
- Stefani Germanotta P/K/A Lady Gaga (BMI) Sony ATV Songs LLC/House of Gaga Publishing, LLC/GloJoe Music Inc. (BMI), Maxwell and Carter Publishing, LLC (ASCAP).

=== Personnel ===
- Lady Gaga – lead vocals, songwriter, producer, guitars, piano
- Madeon – songwriter, mixing
- Paul "DJ White Shadow" Blair – songwriter
- Dave Russell – recording
- Benjamin Rice – recording
- Bill Malina – recording
- Ghazi Hourani – recording
- Daniel Zaidenstadt – recording assistant
- Andrew Robertson – recording assistant
- Steve Faye – recording assistant
- Manny Marroquin – mixing
- Chris Gallant – mixing assistant
- Delhert Bowers – mixing assistant
- Tim Stewart – guitar
- Ivy Skoff – union contract administrator
- Gene Grimaldi – mastering

== Charts ==
Weekly chart performance for "Venus"
Charts (2013)	Peak position
Australia (ARIA)	31
Austria (Ö3 Austria Top 40)	36
Belgium (Ultratop 50 Flanders)	22
Belgium (Ultratop 50 Wallonia)	11
Canada Hot 100 (Billboard)	19
Denmark (Tracklisten)	23
Euro Digital Songs (Billboard)	7
Finland Download (Latauslista)	3
France (SNEP)	9
Germany (GfK)	35
Greece Digital Songs (Billboard)	2
Hungary (Single Top 40)	1
Ireland (IRMA)	13
Italy (FIMI)	7
Netherlands (Single Top 100)	30
New Zealand (Recorded Music NZ)	20
Portugal Digital Songs (Billboard)	8
Scottish Singles Sales (Official Charts)	74
South Korea International (Gaon)	5
Spain (Promusicae)	1
Sweden (DigiListan)	7
Switzerland (Schweizer Hitparade)	18
UK Singles (Official Charts)	76
US Billboard Hot 100	32
US Hot Dance/Electronic Songs (Billboard)	13

== Certifications and sales ==
Certifications and sales for "Venus"
Region	Certification	Certified units/sales
Brazil (Pro-Música Brasil)	Gold	30,000^{‡}
^{‡} Sales+streaming figures based on certification alone.

== See also ==
- Sun Ra discography
