= Do What U Want =

2013 song by Lady Gaga featuring R. Kelly

Single by Lady Gaga featuring R. Kelly

from the album Artpop
- Released: October 21, 2013
- Studio: Record Plant (Los Angeles); PatchWerk (Atlanta)
- Genre: Synth-pop; electropop; R&B
- Length: 3:47
- Label: Streamline; Interscope
- Songwriters: Lady Gaga; Paul "DJ White Shadow" Blair; William Grigahcine; Martin Bresso; R. Kelly
- Producers: Paul "DJ White Shadow" Blair; Lady Gaga

Lady Gaga singles chronology
"Applause" (2013)	"Do What U Want" (2013)	"G.U.Y." (2014)

R. Kelly singles chronology
"My Story" (2013)	"Do What U Want" (2013)	"PYD" (2013)

Christina Aguilera version cover

Audio video
- "Do What U Want" feat. Christina Aguilera on YouTube

"Do What U Want" is a song by American singer Lady Gaga from her third studio album, Artpop (2013). Featuring guest vocals from American singer R. Kelly, the song was released as the album's second single on October 21, 2013, by Streamline and Interscope Records. The lyrics involve Gaga's declaring that her thoughts, dreams, and feelings are her own regardless of anything other people say. She wrote and produced "Do What U Want" alongside Paul "DJ White Shadow" Blair, with additional writing from Kelly, Martin "Tchami" Bresso and William "DJ Snake" Grigahcine. Blair first presented Gaga with the song's initial concept two years prior to its release. Production on "Do What U Want" was completed in 2013, with Kelly's vocals added soon after. Its sudden popularity upon premiering led to the song becoming the second single from Artpop.

Musically, "Do What U Want" is a mid-tempo synth-pop, electropop and R&B song featuring 1980s-style synthesizers and an electronic instrumental track. The lyrics discuss the media's appetite for publishing opinion and critique, with Gaga telling detractors that her thoughts, dreams and feelings are her own, no matter what one does with her body. Upon its release, "Do What U Want" received generally positive reviews from music critics, who praised the song's simplicity and production. The single cover for "Do What U Want", a close-up of Gaga's buttocks in a floral thong, was photographed by American fashion photographer Terry Richardson, who had also directed the song's accompanying music video. The video was planned to be released through BitTorrent in December 2013 but was cancelled for unknown reasons.

"Do What U Want" was a commercial success, topping the charts in Greece and Hungary while peaking within the top 10 in Austria, Canada, Denmark, France, Ireland, Italy, Lebanon, Norway, Scotland, South Korea, Spain, and the United Kingdom as well as the top 20 in Belgium, the Czech Republic, Germany, New Zealand, Sweden, Switzerland, and the United States. Live performances of the song were televised on the 2013 American Music Awards, Alan Carr: Chatty Man, Saturday Night Live, The Voice and The X Factor. Several remixes of "Do What U Want" were released, including ones with guest vocals from American singer Christina Aguilera and American rapper Rick Ross.

On January 10, 2019, Gaga decided to have "Do What U Want" removed from music streaming services after the airing of a television documentary, Surviving R. Kelly, exposed new allegations of sexual misconduct and assault by Kelly, who had previously been charged regarding similar accusations in 2002 but was acquitted in 2008. The song was removed from new vinyl and CD pressings of Artpop in November 2019.

== Writing and development ==
"Do What U Want" was co-written by Gaga, Paul "DJ White Shadow" Blair, R. Kelly, Martin "Tchami" Bresso and William "DJ Snake" Grigahcine. It was produced by Blair and Gaga and features vocals by Kelly. Gaga had been living in Chicago and completing the songs for Artpop, which was being influenced by the R&B and hip hop music predominant there. After seeing a news article discussing her weight, Gaga decided to write a song protesting what she called "shallow journalism". She also wanted to create something different from her past hits, after the release of the first single from the album, "Applause".

Blair recalled how in 2011 his friend Martin was playing him a particular beat from his own remix project. Blair liked the music and presented it to Gaga who had begun writing the song's lyrics while on the Born This Way Ball tour. Blair described its beat as "some space age George Jetson R&B sound". After the lyrics were completed in September 2013, Blair suggested bringing Kelly on board as a collaborator. Kelly was in the process of completing his album, Black Panties, and agreed to participate following a telephone conversation with Gaga. Kelly told Billboard that working with the singer was "natural jelling". Gaga told MTV News about the song:

I've been living in Chicago and spending a lot of time there, and that's where R. Kelly hails from. I was working on Artpop and I wrote ['Do What U Want'] on tour. It was about my obsession with the way people view me. I have always been an R. Kelly fan and actually it is like an epic pastime in the Haus of Gaga that we just get fucked up and play R. Kelly. This is a real R&B song and I [said 'I] have to call the king of R&B and I need his blessing.' It was a mutual love.

== Recording and composition ==
'Do What U Want'
A 24-second sample of "Do What U Want", where Gaga sings the main chorus, "You can't stop my voice / 'Cause you don't own my life / But do what you want with my body". Interspersed with her singing is a "lurching, lascivious beat" forming the main backbone of the song.

"Do What U Want" is a mid-tempo synth-pop, electropop and R&B song, drawing influence from 1980s-inspired throbbing synths and an electronic beat. Eric R. Danton of Rolling Stone described it as a "muscular club beat". James Montgomery from MTV News said that a "lurching, lascivious beat" was the main backbone of the song, interspersed with Gaga's loud-voiced vocals, a "corky" chorus and Kelly's "cool, coital" singing. The song's chorus is built around arpeggios. Complex described its "Do what you want, what you want with my body" hook as "catchy and somewhat raunchy". The song's lyrics represent Gaga telling off detractors that her thoughts, dreams, and feelings are her own, no matter what one says about her. Jim Farber of New York Daily News suggested "Do What U Want" to be a response to "everyone who ever made a tart comment about her — which, by now, involves half the planet". Gaga and Kelly alternate singing the lines "Do what u want/ What u want with my body/ Do what u want/ What u want with my body/ Write what you want, say what you want about me/ If you want you know that I'm not sorry".

According to the sheet music published at Musicnotes.com, "Do What U Want" is set in the time signature of common time, with a moderate tempo of 96 beats per minute. It is composed in the key of F♯ minor with Gaga's vocals ranging from the notes of E_{3} to F♯_{5}. The song follows a basic sequence of D–E–F♯m–E–D–E as its chord progression. "Do What U Want" was recorded at Record Plant Studios in Hollywood, California and at PatchWerk Recording Studios, in Atlanta, Georgia. Gaga's vocals were recorded by Dave Russell and Bill Malina, while Kelly's by Abel Garibaldi and Ian Moonness. Russell held primary mixing of the track at Record Plant, with additional support from Benjamin Rice, Ghazi Hourani, Zane Shoemake, and Dino "SpeedoVee" Zisis. The song's instrumentals include guitars by Tim Stewart, programming by Rick Pearl, and audio mastering done by Gene Grimaldi at Oasis Mastering Studios in Burbank, California.

== Release and promotion ==
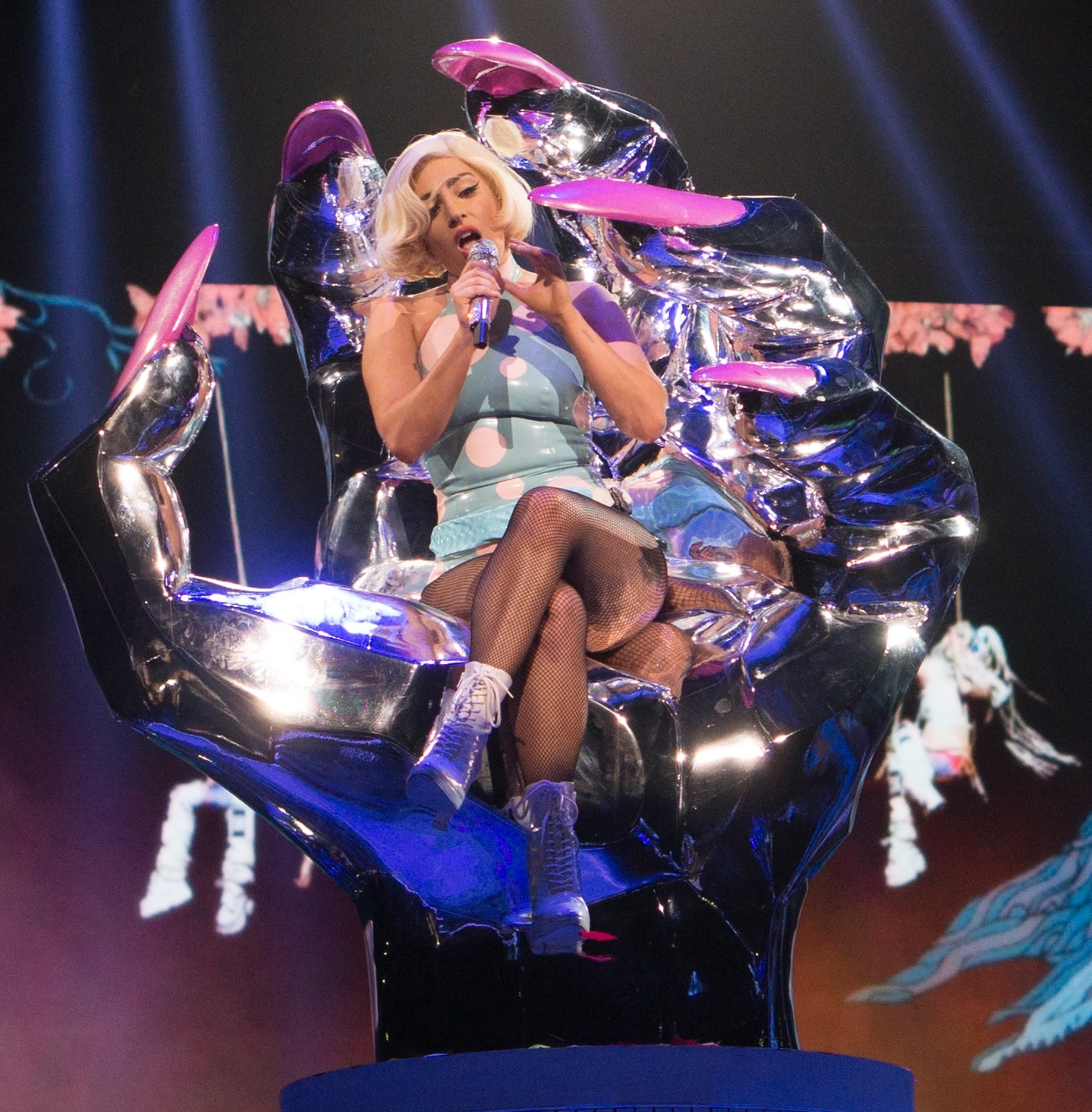
Gaga performing "Do What U Want" on the ArtRave: The Artpop Ball tour while sitting on a claw shaped chair

On September 3, 2013, Gaga asked her fans through Twitter to help her choose the second single: options given were "Manicure", "Sexxx Dreams", "Aura" and "Swine". On September 20, 2013, Gaga announced that "Venus" had been chosen as the second single, and that it would be released before the album. A snippet of "Do What U Want" debuted in a US commercial for Best Buy/Beats on October 17, 2013. It was also used in promotion for British mobile company, O2, as part of their "Be More Dog" campaign. Because of how popular "Do What U Want" quickly became upon its premiere on October 21, 2013, when topping various iTunes charts, Gaga and her label decided to release that as the second official single from Artpop, instead of "Venus". "Do What U Want" officially impacted Italian radio stations four days later, and on October 30, 2013, in the UK. The song impacted mainstream and rhythmic contemporary radio stations in the United States six days afterwards. Lipshutz compared the song's last-minute release to that of "Judas" from Born This Way in April 2011. After quick commercial success, the label soon decided to rush a single release.

The first promotional artwork features Gaga naked with moss covering her genitals. The single's official cover art was released on October 21, showing Gaga's backside, wearing a floral thong. The cover art was shot by photographer Terry Richardson. In an interview with German television station ProSieben, Gaga explained that the explicit imagery for the cover art was due to the constant criticism and discussion surrounding her, adding that "When I look at how society has changed, I feel like this is a good time to show you my ass, because it's all I choose to give you."

According to Digital Spy's Catherine Earp, the shoot resembles a polaroid. Leigh Silver from Complex magazine compared it to Andy Warhol's polaroid series, where the artist shot pictures of blonds and their rear. Hilary Hughes from Esquire called the cover art "awful" but felt that the image paved way for much imagination in lieu of the suggestive theme of the song. The night before the song's release, Gaga tweeted lyrics of "Do What U Want" in reference to critics and rumors that had surfaced throughout her career, including those claiming the singer to be a hermaphrodite, gaining weight in 2012, and her drug addiction. She also addressed media fabrications on her alleged negative relationships with Madonna and Katy Perry. Alex Camp from Slant Magazine felt Gaga's stunt cheapened the song's intent, pointing out how it highlighted the singer's preoccupation with social media and her public image.

== Critical reception ==
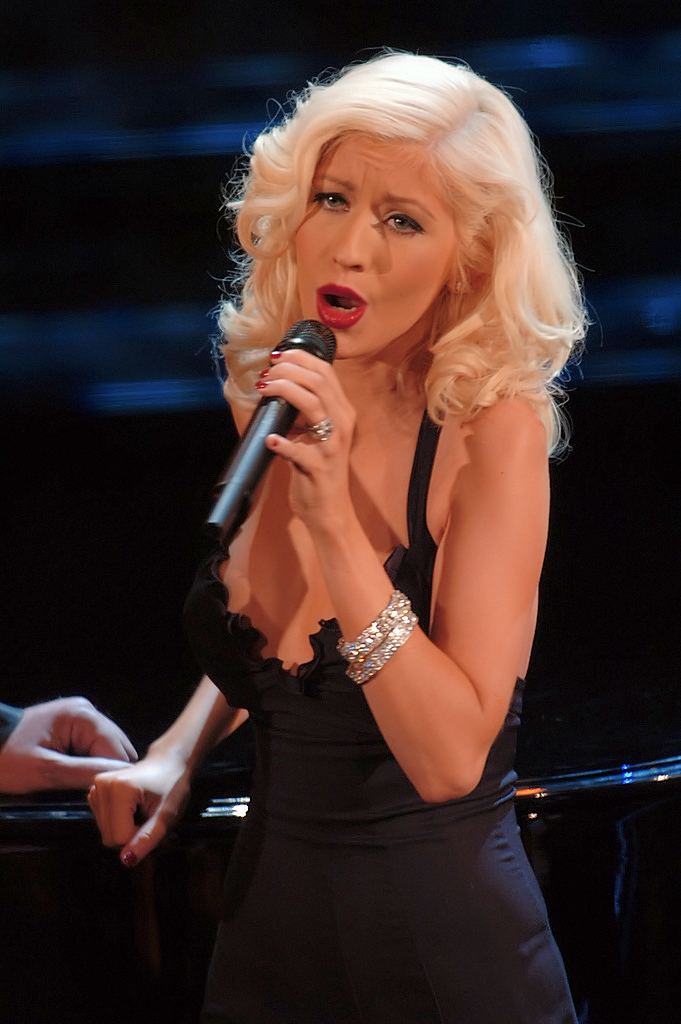
Gaga's vocals in "Do What U Want" were compared to those of Christina Aguilera (pictured), who was later featured on a remix of the song.

Upon release, "Do What U Want" received generally positive response from reviewers. Lars Brandle of Billboard, Slant Magazine contributor Alexa Camp, and Kevin Fallon from The Daily Beast compared Gaga's vocals to those of Aguilera. Camp describes the track as "a measured electro banger that smartly doubles as a love song." Brandle complimented the song as "radio-friendly" and concluded that "Gaga is in good form." Lipshutz, also from Billboard, the same publication wrote that the song and its lyrics were a "thrilling listen, intoxicatingly defiant". Fallon was highly enthusiastic toward the song, calling it "pure pop heaven" and giving his praise to its "chorus that will make it a radio hit..... and driving, danceable beat throughout." Dharmic X from Complex praised "Do What U Want" as "catchy". Latifah Muhammad from Black Entertainment Television felt that "Between the two, Kelly seems the furthest of his sonic comfort zone but nestles into a groove over the dance beat" and described the track as "musical genius".

Jim Farber of New York Daily News gave the song four out of five stars, saying that the "music provides its own quirk. To match the R&B-style beat — and the guest appearance by R. Kelly — Gaga finds a new soul edge to her voice. She belts, scoring a hit in every sense." Slate magazine's Aisha Harris felt that Gaga and Kelly's efforts worked "surprisingly well". Nidhi Tewari of International Business Times said that Gaga sounded her "rebellious best" on the upbeat song. Lewis Corner from Digital Spy gave the song four out of five stars, stating that its "ear-snagging melody revives some of her earlier pop perfection." Hilary Hughes from Esquire felt that Kelly's guest appearance on the song, improved its quality much more than the preceding single "Applause". Hughes added that Gaga's Whitney Houston-esque vocals are elevated further by Kelly's "standard, soaring tenor". "Do What U Want" was listed as one of the 100 Best Songs Of 2013 by Rolling Stone, ranked at number 17.

A mixed review came from Kyle Anderson from Entertainment Weekly, who felt that Gaga and Kelly's vocals track did not "come together" since Gaga's singing style interfered with the composition of the song as well as Kelly's R&B vocals. Anderson also felt that the lyrics sung by Kelly were rehash and subpar. He concluded saying that the song is "an intriguing mind-meld nonetheless". Marc Hogan from Spin magazine said that the song was "as usual" about fame but felt that the cover art complemented the theme the song portrayed. In 2015, Daisy Jones of Dazed said "Do What U Want" was one of the most controversial songs ever because of its theme and Kelly's involvement. Jones said the song provoked controversy "for all the wrong reasons." In a 2025 piece by The Independent, Adam White remarked, "it's not a terrible track by any means, carried by its own slinky menace, but the sleaze oozing out of it means it's probably best forgotten."

== Chart performance ==
In the United States, Nielsen SoundScan reported that "Do What U Want" entered the Hot Digital Songs chart at number three with 156,000 digital downloads in its first week, becoming Gaga's 14th top ten on that chart. Consequently, it debuted at number 13 on the Billboard Hot 100. The song is Kelly's 52nd Hot 100 entry and highest rank since "I'm a Flirt" peaked at number 12 in 2007. The song fell to number 58 the following week. In its third week, "Do What U Want" climbed to number 48 on the chart, aided by its move upwards on the Radio Songs chart, from number 64 to 51, with an audience impression of 23 million, up by about 22% from the second week. Following the release of Artpop, the song returned to the top twenty of Hot 100, moving into number 18. The song has sold 1.3 million copies in the US as of February 2018, and was certified platinum by the Recording Industry Association of America (RIAA). On the Pop Songs chart, "Do What U Want" debuted at number 39 for the issue of November 11, 2013, and moved up to number 29 the next week with a spin increase of 991 on the US radio stations. Next week, the song acquired a further 1,096 spins and moved to number 23 on the chart. It has reached a peak of number seven on Pop Songs, with 9,237 spins. The song also peaked at number eight on the Rhythmic chart with 2,662 spins. "Do What U Want" became the second single by Gaga—the first being her debut single "Just Dance"—not to reach the top of the Hot Dance Club Songs chart, where it stalled inside the top-ten at number seven.

In Australia, "Do What U Want" entered the Australian Singles Chart at number 21; also debuting on the New Zealand Singles Chart at number twelve. The song entered the Irish Singles Chart at number nine and the Netherlands' Mega Single Top 100 at number 27. It also entered the Finnish Download Chart at number two. In South Korea, the song sold 10,576 digital downloads, reaching number eight in the Gaon Digital Chart. It fell to number 13 the next week, selling a further 7,184 copies. Following the album release, the song sold 20,309 copies and reached a new peak of number two. "Do What U Want" reached the top of the charts in Greece, and also reached the top-ten in Denmark, Finland, France, Italy, Norway and Spain. The song debuted at number 50 on the Japan Hot 100, and rose to a peak of number 26 after two weeks. "Do What U Want" also debuted at number seven on the Canadian Hot 100 and in its eleventh week on the chart, the song reached a new peak of number three. It was certified gold by Music Canada, for selling over 40,000 digital downloads.

In the United Kingdom, "Do What U Want" was deemed ineligible to enter the UK Singles Chart. The Official Charts Company released a statement explaining that the song would be allowed to chart only after the associated album's pre-order offer ended. The rules of the Official Chart Company "allow one 'instant grat' promotion per album, i.e a single track download given away as an album pre-order incentive. 'Do What U Want' is the second track [following 'Applause'] to be delivered to fans who pre-order Artpop". Thus the song was not eligible to enter the chart until the promotion finished and the album was released. According to Alan Jones from Music Week, in the week following its release the single sold 22,915 copies in the UK. After the release of Artpop, "Do What U Want" debuted at number nine on the UK charts with sales of 29,657 copies becoming her 11th top-ten single there. It also entered the Scottish Singles Chart at the same position. "Do What U Want" has sold 383,000 copies in the United Kingdom as of April 2021, and was certified gold by the British Phonographic Industry (BPI) for 400,000 copies of streaming equivalent units. It was Gaga's most streamed song in the country before being overtaken by "Shallow" (2018).

== Live performances ==
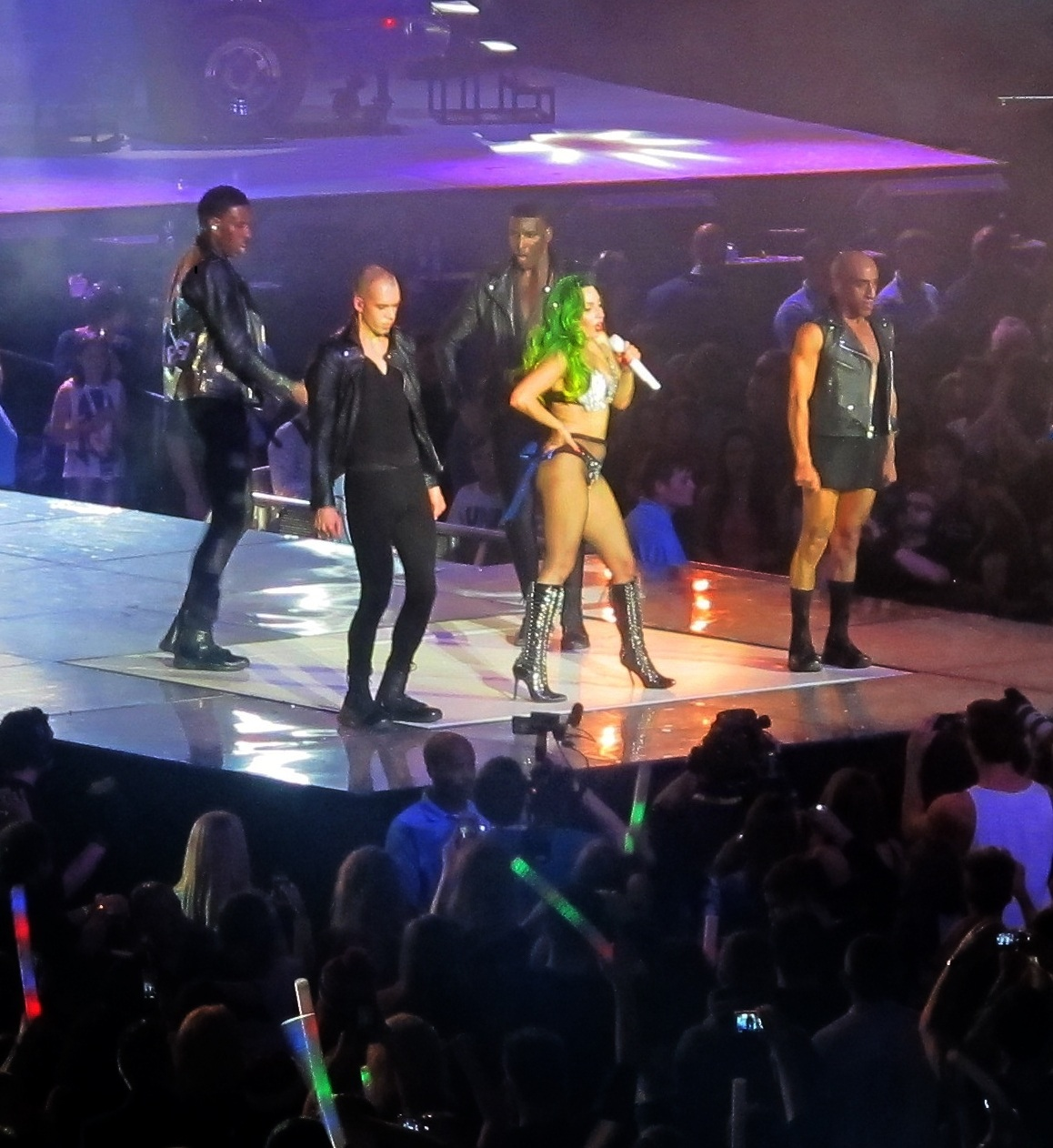
Gaga performing "Do What U Want" at the Jingle Bell Ball in London on December 8, 2013

Gaga performed the song live along with "Venus" on the tenth series of The X Factor (UK) on October 27, 2013, at Fountain Studios in Wembley. Jason Lipshutz from Billboard denoted it as "intoxicatingly weird". ITV, which aired the performance, and Ofcom, the British media regulator, received around 260 complaints regarding the performance, due to Gaga's costume and the suggestive lyrics of the track, which was broadcast before the 9pm watershed. A spokesperson from the channel released a statement that they did not believe the performance to be inappropriate. During her ArtRave party for the release of Artpop, Gaga performed eight songs from the album, closing the set with "Do What U Want". The performance ended with the singer mirroring the pose of the album cover art—a Jeff Koons sculpture—on the stage, by sitting down and spreading her legs apart, while cupping her breasts. On November 16, 2013, Gaga performed "Do What U Want" at episode 751 of the 39th season of comedy show Saturday Night Live. Kelly appeared as the guest vocalist, doing the similar routine with Gaga, and picking her up from the stage on his shoulder. There was also sex simulations, dry humping and they ended the performance in an embrace. According to Zach Johnson from E!, the performance drew mixed reaction from the media.

Gaga had revealed during ArtRave that she and Kelly would perform "Do What U Want" at the American Music Awards of 2013 on November 24. During the performance, Gaga enacted the role of a secretary for the President of the United States, which was played by Kelly, pantomiming fellatio that invoked the Clinton–Lewinsky scandal. The stage was set up to be reminiscent of the Oval Office. Gaga belted out the final chorus of the song alone, as the backdrops displayed a video of the singer playing a piano as a child. The epilogue featured self-deprecating newspaper headlines in the backdrops, proclaiming "Lady Gaga is Over" and "Lady Gaga is Fat". Jason Lipshutz of Billboard called it "the most elaborate performance" of the ceremony and found parallels with Kelly's own rap opera Trapped in the Closet in its storytelling.

At the British chat show, Alan Carr: Chatty Man, Gaga performed another acoustic version of the track. Wearing a Kansai Yamamoto bodice with an iPad attached to it, Gaga belted out the song while playing the piano. Another performance took place at the 2013 Jingle Bell Ball on December 8, 2013, where she sang "Do What U Want" along with other songs from her discography. It was first announced that Gaga would perform on the fifth-season finale of The Voice on December 12, 2013, with the assumption that R. Kelly would accompany her during a performance of "Do What U Want". However, for the December 17 finale, Christina Aguilera joined Gaga for a performance of "Do What U Want"; Gaga later explained that after The Voice invited her to perform, she asked whether Aguilera would join her. They sang "Do What U Want" as the final performance of the evening. Both appeared in "matching clothes" with few differences, Gaga wore a "jumpsuit all sharp, off-kilter angles", while Aguilera was dressed in a "slinky-sexy gown emphasizing her smooth curves". A writer from Rap-Up praised it as an "over-the-top" performance. Los Angeles Times writer Amy Reiter commended the pair's vocal ability as "triumphant". On the 2014 ArtRave: The Artpop Ball tour, the song was performed after "Paparazzi". Gaga perched atop a silver chair shaped like a hand, and sang the song. Kelly's verses were removed from the live rendition. Eric Leijon from The Gazette praised the song saying that it had "earned [its] place alongside crowd pleasers 'Paparazzi' and 'Bad Romance'" from Gaga's catalogue of hits.

== Music video ==
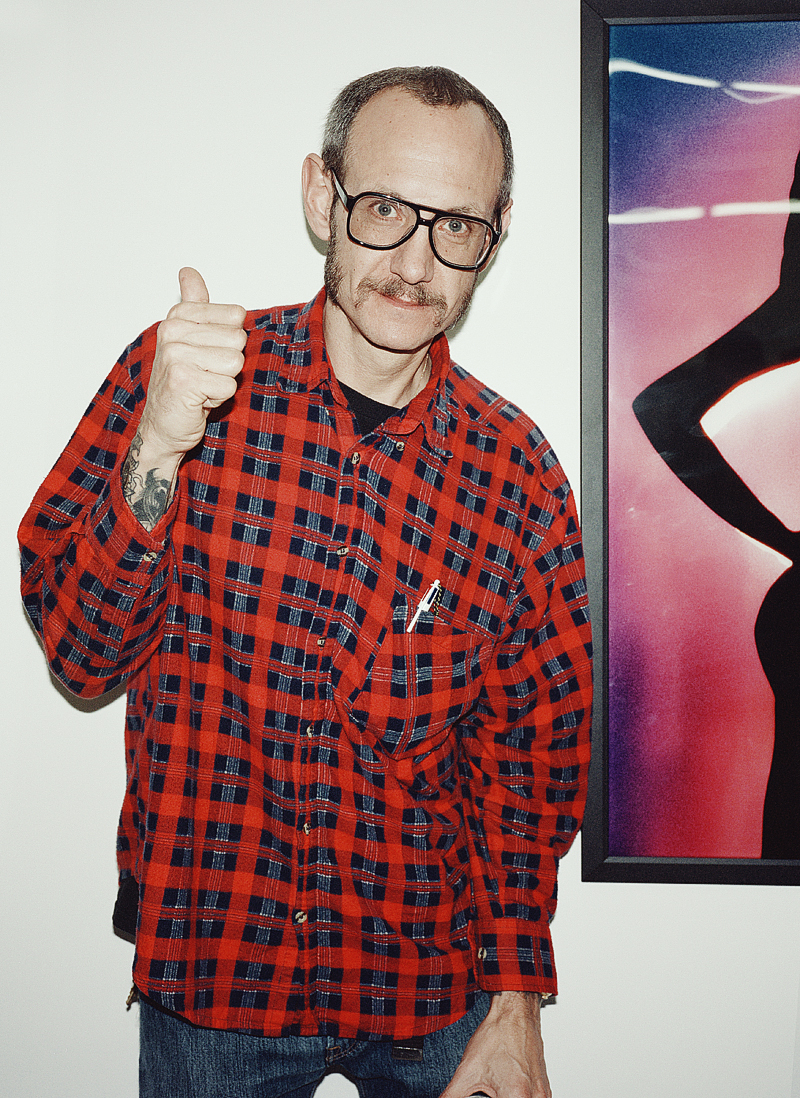
Photographer Terry Richardson had shot the music video for the song, along with the cover artwork.

Gaga confirmed Richardson as the director during her ArtRave party. Richardson had previously shot the "Cake Like Lady Gaga" snippet video, featuring the singer playing with cake. He had been wanting to do music videos for some time, and started his work in the medium with the video for Miley Cyrus' single "Wrecking Ball" and Beyoncé's "XO". After her provocative performance of the song on Saturday Night Live, many interviewers had questioned Gaga regarding her chemistry with Kelly, leading the singer to tweet the following message: "Many interviewers quelped today about my 'SHOCKING' performance w/ R Kelly on SNL I'm beginning to think y'all aren't ready for the video."

On November 26, 2013, Interscope Records announced that the video would be released through file sharing service BitTorrent and Vice, sometime in December 2013. This was intended to be BitTorrent's second initiative, following a similar release for singer Madonna and her secretprojectrevolution video. The bundle would consist of the music video, pictures, a separate clip in 4K resolution documenting the making of the release, and interviews with Gaga and director Richardson. Interscope described the bundle as a means of "explor[ing] the link between open expression and open technology; providing an inside look at the creative process, with original film, music, archival content and behind-the-scenes footage direct from artists."

On December 4, 2013, Gaga tweeted that she was intent on making the video "perfect" since it was unlike her previous endeavors, adding that it was "very personal". Two days later, Richardson posted a black-and-white photo from the set of the video, which showed Gaga being held by Kelly; with her legs wrapped around his waist. She wore nothing but a black bikini, while Kelly gestured his middle finger towards the camera in a leather pant/kilt dress. One week later, a colored behind-the-scenes photo was released, showing the singers in the same garments as the previous image, while Kelly stood with his legs spread apart as Gaga crawled in between them.

However, the bundle as well as the video was not released in December. Gaga later released a statement in her social networking website Little Monsters that the video was delayed since the singer was given just one week to plan and complete it, like the video for "Applause". She added that it was unlike her since she preferred planning her videos over a period of time to honor her creativity. The clip remained unreleased and on June 19, 2014, celebrity news website TMZ published footage from the video showing sexually suggestive scenes. In one of them, Kelly, playing a doctor, reaches under a sheet covering a naked Gaga, causing her to moan. Pitchfork described the video as "Kelly hosting a softcore orgy with Gaga's anesthetized body". Daisy Jones of Dazed said it was for the better that the video was not released. She opined that the song's lyrics, the involvement of Kelly and Richardson (who, like Kelly, was accused of sexual misconduct), and the music video's concept were "bad ideas all around."

== Remixes ==
=== DJWS remix ===
The DJWS remix of "Do What U Want" featuring R. Kelly and rapper Rick Ross was released on December 20, 2013. Ross told in an interview with MTV that he was not prepared for collaborating with Gaga. The remix starts with Kelly's vocals with a new introduction, followed by Ross rapping on a verse, adding new lines like "Photos of the Bawse just to post 'em on a blog/Get alotta views cause they know we be the top/Jean Basquiats in the hall, she my work of art so I pin her to the wall." During Gaga's vocals, the "groove" of the song is updated which was described by Fuse as "nostalgic, banging, sex-freaky and new all at the same time. It's a 2013 ode to another era of synth R&B." Molly Wardlow from the channel was however dismissive of Ross' verse, calling it unnecessary. Spin magazine's Chris Martin noted that Ross' contribution to "Do What U Want" sounded "awkward" and found similarity with Jay-Z's rap verse in singer Beyoncé's song, "Drunk in Love".

=== Remix featuring Christina Aguilera ===
An alternate studio version of "Do What U Want" featuring Christina Aguilera was released on January 1, 2014; it marked Gaga and Aguilera's first collaboration. The song was released in the United States, Canada and Mexico on January 1, 2014, and then released a day later worldwide. Days before, on December 24, 2013, Aguilera tweeted that she was "working on something special" and attached an image of her singing in a recording studio. The session took place in the living room of singer Carly Simon's home at Martha's Vineyard, with assistance from Oak Bluffs-based producer Jimmy Parr. The following week, it was announced that a revised studio version of "Do What U Want" would be released, where the original vocals by Kelly are substituted for a verse performed by Aguilera.

The final version was digitally released shortly after midnight on January 1, 2014. On February 21, 2014, Interscope digitally released four additional remixes featuring Aguilera: three by Steven Redant and a deep house remix by Red Ant and Amp Lexvaz. The Aguilera remix received generally favorable reviews from music critics; Melissa Locker from Time magazine felt that the re-recorded version of the track "will allow more sales of the track without the moral dilemma that comes with supporting Kelly", who had previously been charged and acquitted for child pornography in the 2000s, and also complimented Gaga as a "savvy marketer" for releasing "two versions of a hit song with two different megastars". Attitude's Jamie Tabberer considered the original version of "Do What U Want" to be Gaga's "most problematic" and "worst-ever" single, but noted that it was "somewhat redeemed by the Christina-featured remix", which he thought was "elegant".

== Removal ==
Gaga initially defended her collaboration with Kelly, saying that they both have had "sometimes [...] very untrue things written about" them. However, on January 10, 2019, Gaga spoke out after the release of the Lifetime series, Surviving R. Kelly, which documented the sexual abuse allegations against Kelly. The singer confessed her regret about working with Kelly, explaining that her thinking was "explicitly twisted" and that she had "poor judgment" at that time. Gaga vowed to support women who had been through abuse and by the next day had the track removed from iTunes and all streaming services. Keith Caulfield from Billboard reported that even the remixes featuring Kelly were not playable on Spotify and other platforms, only the version featuring Aguilera was present. He theorized that since changes to digital music services take time, Gaga's management were working and removing the song from every medium gradually. Following Gaga's statement and just hours before the song's removal, sales of "Do What U Want" rose by 13,720% in the US to 2,000 music downloads, according to Nielsen SoundScan.

The song was removed from new vinyl and CD pressings of Artpop in November 2019.

== Track listing and formats ==
Digital download

1. "Do What U Want" feat. R. Kelly – 3:47

Digital download – remix single

1. "Do What U Want" feat. R. Kelly and Rick Ross (DJWS Remix) – 4:19

Digital download – remix single

1. "Do What U Want" feat. Christina Aguilera – 3:36

Digital remixes EP

1. "Do What U Want" feat. R. Kelly (DJ White Shadow Remix) – 4:03
2. "Do What U Want" feat. R. Kelly (Samantha Ronson Remix) – 4:27
3. "Do What U Want" feat. R. Kelly (Kronic Remix) – 5:12
4. "Do What U Want" feat. Christina Aguilera (Steven Redant Madrid Radio Remix) – 4:00
5. "Do What U Want" feat. Christina Aguilera (Steven Redant Madrid Club Remix) – 7:31
6. "Do What U Want" feat. Christina Aguilera (Steven Redant Barcelona Remix) – 6:28

== Credits and personnel ==
Credits adapted from the liner notes of Artpop.

=== Management ===
- Recorded at Record Plant Studios, Hollywood, California and PatchWerk Recording Studios, West Midtown, Atlanta, Georgia
- R. Kelly appears courtesy of RCA Records, a division of Sony Music Entertainment
- Stefani Germanotta P/K/A Lady Gaga (BMI) Sony ATV Songs LLC / Haus of Gaga Publishing, LLC / GloJoe Music Inc. (BMI), Maxwell and Carter Publishing, LLC (ASCAP)
- Administered by Universal Music Publishing Group, Etrange Fruit (SACEM), Fuzion (SACEM), Administered by Get Familiar Music (ASCAP), R. Kelly Publishing Inc. / Universal Music – Z Music LLC (BMI)

=== Personnel ===
- Lady Gaga – songwriter, lead vocals, producer, synth arrangement
- Paul "DJ White Shadow" Blair – songwriter, producer
- R. Kelly – songwriter, guest vocals
- Christina Aguilera – guest vocals
- Martin Bresso – songwriter
- William Grigahcine – songwriter
- Dave Russell – recording (Lady Gaga), mixing
- Bill Malina – recording (Lady Gaga), additional recording
- Abel Garibaldi – recording (R. Kelly)
- Ian Moonness – recording (R. Kelly)
- Ghazi Hourani – additional recording, mixing assistant
- Benjamin Rice – recording and mixing assistant
- Zane Shoemake – recording assistant
- Dino "SpeedoVee" Zisis – additional recording
- George "Spanky" McCurdy – drums
- Tim Stewart – guitars
- Donnie Lyle – musical director for R. Kelly
- Ivy Skoff – union contract administrator
- Gene Grimaldi – mastering

== Charts ==
=== Weekly charts ===
Weekly chart performance
Chart (2013–2022)	Peak position
Australia (ARIA)	21
Australia Dance (ARIA)	6
Austria (Ö3 Austria Top 40)	10
Belgium (Ultratop 50 Flanders)	15
Belgium (Ultratop 50 Wallonia)	11
Canada Hot 100 (Billboard)	3
Canada AC (Billboard)	34
Canada CHR/Top 40 (Billboard)	4
Canada Hot AC (Billboard)	4
CIS Airplay (TopHit)	141
Czech Republic Airplay (ČNS IFPI)	19
Denmark (Tracklisten)	5
Denmark (Tracklisten) featuring Christina Aguilera	27
Euro Digital Song Sales (Billboard)	6
Finland Airplay (Radiosoittolista)	6
Finland Download (Latauslista)	2
France (SNEP)	8
Germany (GfK)	14
Greece Digital Songs (Billboard)	1
Hungary (Single Top 40)	1
Hungary (Single Top 40) featuring Christina Aguilera	15
Hungary (Stream Top 40)	8
Ireland (IRMA)	9
Italy (FIMI)	3
Japan Hot 100 (Billboard)	26
Lebanon (Lebanese Top 20)	5
Luxembourg Digital Song Sales (Billboard)	10
Mexico Anglo (Monitor Latino)	7
Netherlands (Dutch Top 40)	34
Netherlands (Single Top 100)	27
New Zealand (Recorded Music NZ)	12
Norway (VG-lista)	7
Poland Dance (ZPAV) featuring R. Kelly and Rick Ross	49
Portugal Digital Song Sales (Billboard)	7
Romania Airplay (Media Forest)	8
Russia Airplay (TopHit)	60
Scottish Singles Sales (Official Charts)	9
Slovakia Airplay (ČNS IFPI)	26
Slovenia (SloTop50)	36
South Korean Foreign (Circle)	4
Spain (Promusicae)	2
Sweden (Sverigetopplistan)	17
Switzerland (Schweizer Hitparade)	14
UK Singles (Official Charts)	9
US Billboard Hot 100	13
US Adult Pop Airplay (Billboard)	22
US Dance Club Songs (Billboard)	7
US Dance Airplay (Billboard)	22
US Latin Pop Airplay (Billboard)	31
US Pop Airplay (Billboard)	7
US Rhythmic Airplay (Billboard)	8
Venezuela Pop Rock (Record Report)	11

=== Year-end charts ===
2013 year-end chart performance
Chart (2013)	Position
Australia Dance (ARIA)	36
France (SNEP)	132
Italy (Musica e dischi)	98
UK Singles (Official Charts)	133

2014 year-end chart performance
Chart (2014)	Position
Canada (Canadian Hot 100)	44
France (SNEP)	134
US Billboard Hot 100	84
US Pop Airplay (Billboard)	48
US Radio Songs (Billboard)	59
US Rhythmic (Billboard)	43

== Certifications and sales ==
Certifications and sales
Region	Certification	Certified units/sales
Australia (ARIA)	Platinum	70,000^{‡}
Brazil (Pro-Música Brasil)	Platinum	60,000^{‡}
Canada (Music Canada)	Gold	40,000^{*}
Germany (BVMI)	Gold	150,000^{‡}
Italy (FIMI)	Platinum	30,000^{‡}
Mexico (AMPROFON)	Gold	30,000^{*}
New Zealand (RMNZ)	Gold	7,500^{*}
Norway (IFPI Norway)	Gold	30,000^{‡}
South Korea (Gaon)	—	44,186
Sweden (GLF)	Platinum	40,000^{‡}
United Kingdom (BPI)	Gold	383,000
United States (RIAA)	Platinum	1,300,000
Streaming
Denmark (IFPI Danmark)	Platinum	1,800,000^{†}
^{*} Sales figures based on certification alone.^{‡} Sales+streaming figures based on certification alone.^{†} Streaming-only figures based on certification alone.

== Release history ==
Release dates and formats
Region	Date	Format(s)	Version	Label(s)	Ref.
United States	October 21, 2013	Digital download; streaming	Original	Streamline; Interscope	
Germany	October 22, 2013	Digital download; streaming	Original	Universal	
United Kingdom	October 22, 2013	Digital download; streaming	Original	Polydor	
Italy	October 25, 2013	Radio airplay	Original	Universal	
United States	November 5, 2013	Contemporary hit radio; rhythmic contemporary radio	Original	Streamline; Interscope	
Various	December 20, 2013	Digital download; streaming	DJWS remix	Streamline; Interscope	
Various	January 1, 2014	Digital download; streaming	Remix featuring Christina Aguilera	Streamline; Interscope	
Various	February 25, 2014	Digital download; streaming	Remixes	Streamline; Interscope	
