= Sexxx Dreams =

2013 song by Lady Gaga

Song by Lady Gaga

from the album Artpop
- Released: November 6, 2013
- Studio: Record Plant (Hollywood); CRC (Chicago)
- Genre: Synth-pop
- Length: 3:34
- Label: Streamline; Interscope
- Songwriters: Lady Gaga; Paul "DJ White Shadow" Blair; Martin Bresso; William Grigahcine
- Producers: Paul "DJ White Shadow" Blair; Lady Gaga

Audio video
- "Sexxx Dreams" on YouTube

"Sexxx Dreams" (censored as "X Dreams") is a song by American singer Lady Gaga from her third studio album, Artpop (2013). The song was written by Gaga, Paul "DJ White Shadow" Blair, Martin Bresso, and William Grigahcine, and produced by Blair and Gaga, with co-production from Nick Monson and Dino Zisis. Inspired by Gaga's erotic fantasies and dreams, the song went through a number of changes to make it understandable for the singer's team, while keeping a constant chorus. A synth-pop song, Gaga promoted the title by using a number of hashtags involving the name in her social media accounts, and at one point was considered for a single release from Artpop.

Critics received the song favorably, complimenting the composition, the futuristic sound, the lyrical insights into Gaga's life, and compared it to the music of singers Janet Jackson, Paula Abdul and Prince. It debuted at number 53 in the Gaon Chart of South Korea, selling 3,414 copies during the release week of Artpop. "Sexxx Dreams" was one of several album tracks included in Gaga's 2013 concert at the iTunes Festival in London. It was also present on the set list of Gaga's residency show at Roseland Ballroom and ArtRave: The Artpop Ball tour.

== Writing and composition ==
Development of Lady Gaga's third studio album, Artpop, began shortly after the release of her second one, Born This Way (2011), and by the following year, the album's concepts were "beginning to flourish" as Gaga collaborated with producers Fernando Garibay and DJ White Shadow. However, while on tour for the Born This Way Ball, Gaga had to undergo a hip surgery in February 2013 which forced the singer into a six month hiatus, and this rehabilitation became one of the inspirations behind the album.

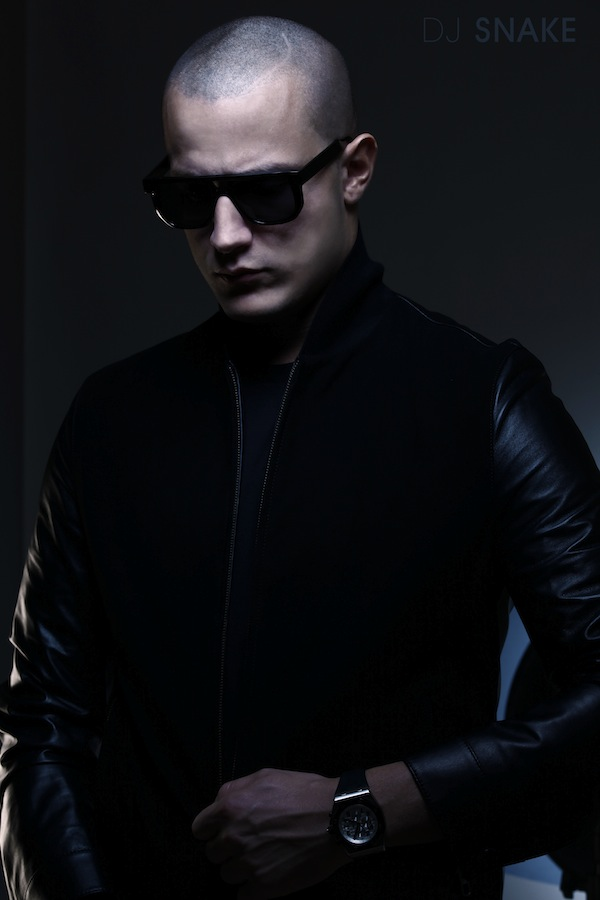
William Grigahcine, better known as DJ Snake

"Sexxx Dreams" was written by Gaga, Paul "DJ White Shadow" Blair, Martin Bresso, and William Grigahcine, and produced by Blair, Gaga, Nick Monson, and Dino Zisis. Its lyrics propose a sexual encounter with a lover whose boyfriend is gone for the weekend. Gaga was inspired to write the song from her "mucky" fantasies. She said in an interview with the Daily Mirror:

In my mind when I picture sex dreams, it's so bizarre!.. It's me standing there with some massive couture creation, staring at a blow-up doll or something. That's what my sex dreams are like. My sex dreams are weird... Haven't you ever been laying in bed with someone and fantasised about someone else?... In the song I'm explaining my infidelity to the person I'm with, and then I'm having a conversation with myself to the person that I'm fantasising about.

In November 2013, during a special iHeartRadio Album Release Party broadcast on more than 150 Clear Channel stations to promote Artpop, Gaga revealed to Ryan Seacrest that "sexy sculptures" appear in her "crazy" and "really bizarre" dreams. She introduced the song as "something really erotic and exotic", allowing fans to "experience what it's like to be me". Gaga and her team spent a lot of time creating the rhythm of the song. At first people involved in the production were not sure of Gaga's idea behind the composition, and hence it went through a lot of changes, but kept the chorus as constant since Gaga was against changing it.

Gaga explained that the dialogue exchange in the lyrics alternate between singing to one person, and speaking to another, which reverses from verse to verse. Here the people she converses with in the song are her imaginary boyfriend and girlfriend. Jason Lipshutz of Billboard said the song is one in which Gaga "balances a disintegrating relationship and a lustful fantasy" and "juggles a pastel-colored 80's aesthetic and R-rated breakdown of unspoken desire". MTV's Brenna Ehrlich described it as a "sweaty, sultry jam about touching oneself". According to the sheet music published at Musicnotes.com, "Sexxx Dreams" is set in common time with a moderate dance tempo of 120 beats per minute. It is composed in the key of C minor with Gaga's vocals spanning from G_{3} to F_{5}. The song has a basic sequence of G♯–Cm–G♯–Cm during the verses and Cm–A♯–G♯–Cm in the chorus.

== Production and promotion ==
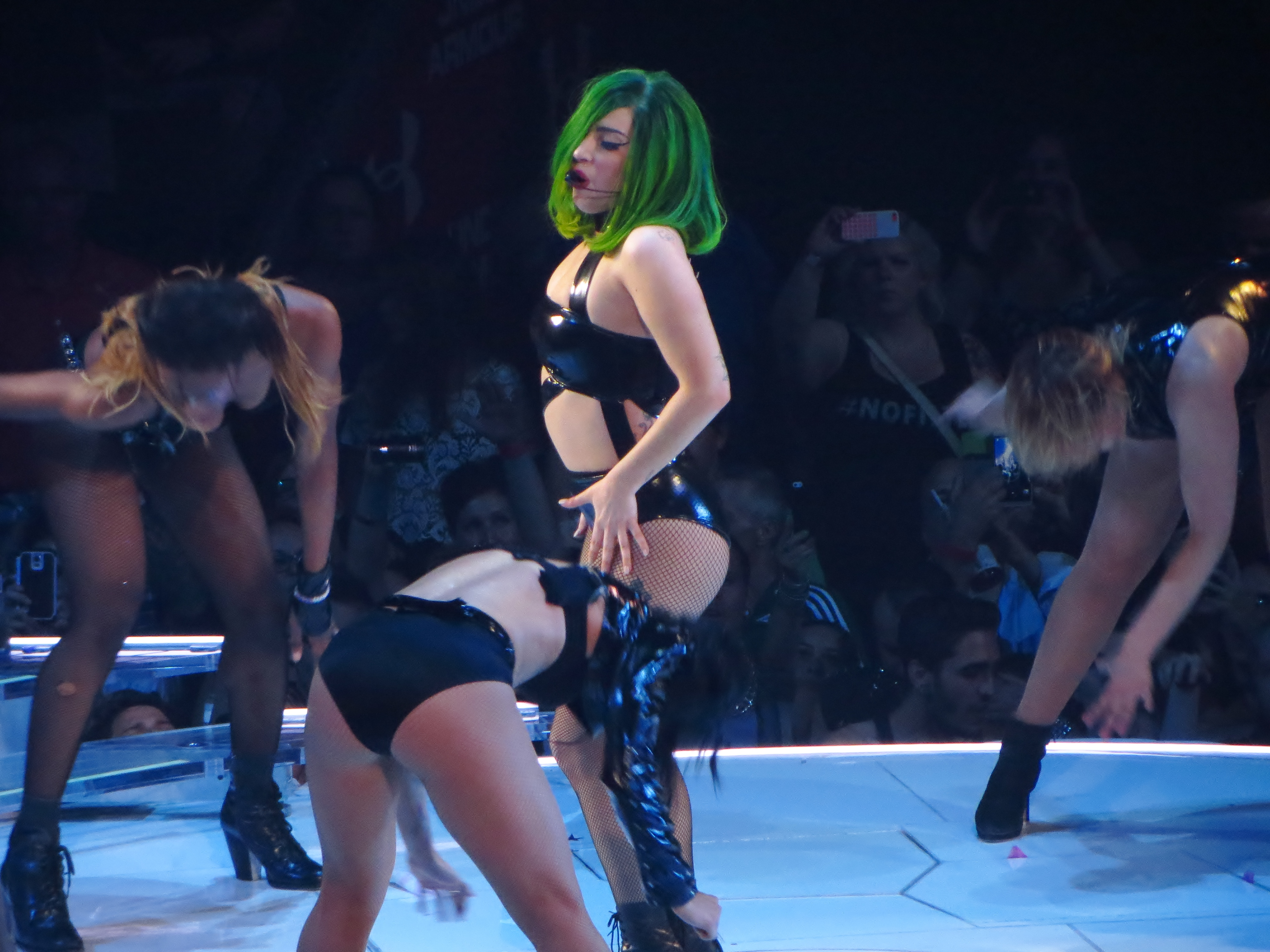
Gaga performing "Sexxx Dreams" during ArtRave: The Artpop Ball tour

In August 2013, Gaga released a preview of "Sexxx Dreams" prior to her performance of September 1, 2013 at the iTunes Festival in London. In the video, she sings "When I lay in bed I touch myself and I think of you". The video then shows Gaga rehearsing for the festival and displays in pink font, "We wanna give you #sexdreams'". Gaga also promoted the song on social media by posting song lyrics ("Last night damn, you were in my #SexDreams doing really nasty things"), and encouraging use of a hashtag containing lyrics (#whenilayinbeditouchmyselfandthinkofyou).

On September 3, 2013, after debuting several tracks from Artpop at the festival, Gaga polled her fans about how to promote the album, asking: "OK MONSTERS! Now that you've seen some of ARTPOP Live, what would be YOUR pick for 2nd Single?" Fans could choose between "Aura", "Manicure" and "Sexxx Dreams". At one point, the latter was in the lead by nearly 10,000 votes. However, the song was never selected as an official single.

Later that month, Rihanna tweeted: "Just left the studio... Recorded a #monster hook for one of my favorite artists! And that's all I can give you... #NavyShit", then posted a separate message, "Lastnight.... YOU were in my sex dreams!!" Her tease, followed by Gaga's response, "@rihanna doing really NASTY THINGS *dancing gaga*", lead to rumors that Rihanna would be collaborating on the version that would appear on Artpop. However, Rihanna's vocals do not appear on the album.

== Critical reception ==
"Sexxx Dreams" received generally positive reviews and drew comparisons to the work of Paula Abdul, Janet Jackson and Prince. The Atlantic's Spencer Kornhaber said the song "doses Prince's 'Little Red Corvette' with some dread and Gaga using lust as therapy". In his review of Artpop for Billboard, Lipshutz called the song "seductive" and said it marks where the "sexuality and synth-pop pleasures of [the album] fully bloom." Robert Cospey of Digital Spy said the track highlights Gaga "doing her best Janet Jackson impression, and she does it very well."

The Guardian's Michael Cragg described "Sexxx Dreams" as a "Vanity 6-esque strut", and dubbed it and "Do What U Want", as "futuristic, electro-tooled R&B slow jams with delicious choruses". MTV's John Walker said of the song, "There's something so goofily erotic about telling someone 'you were in my sex dreams.' It's such a cumbersome phrase, yet Gaga somehow makes it one of the most erotic lines you'll heard [sic] all year. The half-giggled 'I really shouldn't be telling you this' line at the song's climax — no pun intended — really seals the deal." Walker humorously rated the song 5 out of 5 "vaguely vaginal Georgia O'Keeffe orchids". The Independent's Adam White saw it as one of the strongest tracks from Artpop, and described it as "a sentient dry-hump, full of theatrical flourishes" with "a kitchen sink quality here that works unusually well." Similarly, Kristen S. Hé of Vulture felt it "embodies 2013 Gaga's everything-but-the-kitchen-sink approach to songwriting", adding that it's "weird as hell" and "packed with twists and turns".

Bradley Stern of MuuMuse said the song is "all sorts of throwback '80's-R&B ferociousness, blending dirty-minded temptation with a seriously fierce strut a la Janet Jackson and Paula Abdul — and a bit of Divinyls' 'I Touch Myself'." In his album review, he described the song as "a purely Prince/Vanity 6-inspired production, seductively sauntering into the speakers across a nasty, smutty slap of a beat". Stern considered the track one of the album's best moments and wrote, "there's no part of 'Sexxx Dreams' that isn't purely aural sex". Two lyrics from the song were included in USA Today's list of the eleven most suggestive lyrics from Artpop.

Some reviewers commented on the part in which Gaga says she's "had a couple of drinks". Lipshutz wrote that Gaga sounded "loose and light-hearted, letting her audience twirl around on the dance floor". Cragg said it sounded as though her vocals had been "covertly recorded during a drunken game of truth or dare".

== Live performances ==
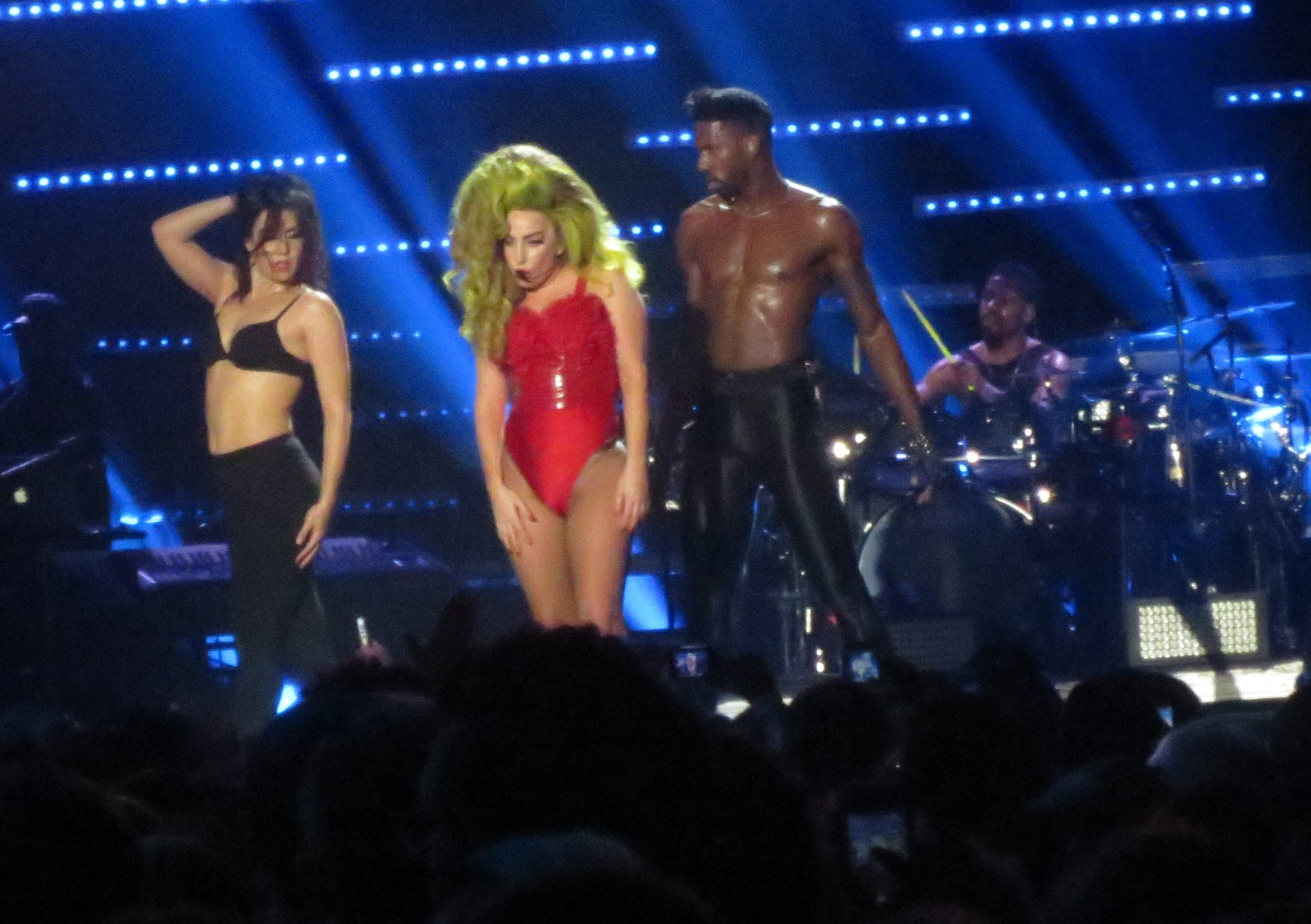
Gaga performing "Sexxx Dreams" during her residency, Lady Gaga Live at Roseland Ballroom (2014)

"Sexxx Dreams" was one of several Artpop tracks included in Gaga's 2013 concert at the iTunes Festival in London. Ashley Percival of The Huffington Post wrote of her performance: "'Sex Dreams' made 2009's 'LoveGame' with its disco stick look like a nursery rhyme, as she delivered its racy and oh-so-Gaga lyrics." Reviewing Gaga's live performance, Gil Kaufman of MTV described the song as "theatrical, throbbing pop", with Gaga channeling "Prince, Madonna and anyone else who writhed on, humped or thrusted into a stage in the 1980s while sharing their most intimate, detailed nighttime desires."

In November 2013, Gaga performed "Sexxx Dreams" at ArtRave, a two-day promotional event for Artpop, held at the Brooklyn Navy Yard in New York. In their review of the event, Billboard contributors Andrew Hampp and Jason Lipshutz wrote that her performance of the song was "presented with colorful choreography but paled in comparison" to the studio version.

Gaga included the song in the set list for her March–April 2014 residency at Roseland Ballroom, showing off her "flirty side". In his review of her opening night performance, Jon Caramanica of The New York Times described "Sexxx Dreams" as a song about fantasy and noted how Gaga "pinballed back and forth" between a male and female dancer. The same year, Gaga performed the song during her ArtRave: The Artpop Ball tour, accompanied by backup dancers dressed in fetish clothing. Kitty Empire from The Guardian refrained that "the latex'n'lasers section, where Gaga sings 'Sexxx Dreams', finds no new take on the dry-humping of chaises-longues." In 2017, Gaga performed the song at the Coachella Festival.

== Credits and personnel ==
Credits adapted from the liner notes of Artpop.

=== Management ===
- Recorded at Record Plant Studios, Hollywood, California and CRC Studios, Chicago, Illinois
- Mixed at Record Plant Studios, Hollywood, California and Heard IT! Studios, North Hollywood, California
- Sony/ATV Songs, LLC/ House of Gaga Publishing, LLC / GloJoe Music Inc. (BMI), Maxwell and Carter Publishing, LLC (ASCAP), Etrange Fruit (SACEM), Fuzion (SACEM) administered by Get Familiar Music (ASCAP)

=== Personnel ===
- Lady Gaga – songwriter, lead vocals, producer, guitars
- Paul "DJ White Shadow" Blair – songwriter, producer
- Dino Zisis – additional production
- Nick Monson – additional production, guitars
- Martin Bresso – songwriter
- William Grigahcine – songwriter
- Dave Russell – recording, mixing
- Bill Malina – recording
- Benjamin Rice – recording and mixing assistant
- Daniel Zaidenstadt – recording assistant
- Andrew Robertson – recording assistant
- Austin Thomas – recording assistant
- Ghazi Hourani – additional recording, mixing assistant
- Tim Stewart – guitars for Haus of Gaga
- Donnie Lyle – bass guitar
- Rick Pearl – additional programming
- Ivy Skoff – union contract administrator
- Gene Grimaldi – mastering

== Charts ==
Weekly chart performance for "Sexxx Dreams"
Charts (2013)	Peak position
South Korea International (Gaon)	53
