= Lady Gaga Live at Roseland Ballroom =

2014 residency show

- Residency by Lady Gaga
- Promotional poster for the residency
- Location: Manhattan, New York, US
- Venue: Roseland Ballroom
- Start date: March 28, 2014
- End date: April 7, 2014
- No. of shows: 7
- Box office: $1.52 million ($2.07 million in 2025 dollars)

Lady Gaga concert chronology
- ArtRave
  (2013)
- Lady Gaga Live at Roseland Ballroom
  (2014)
- ArtRave: The Artpop Ball
  (2014)
Lady Gaga concert residency chronology
Lady Gaga Live at Roseland Ballroom (2014)	Lady Gaga Enigma + Jazz & Piano (2018–2024)

Lady Gaga Live at Roseland Ballroom was the first concert residency by American singer Lady Gaga. Performed at the Roseland Ballroom in Manhattan, New York, the residency began on March 28 and concluded on April 7, 2014, after completing seven shows. It was the final event hosted by the venue after it was announced that it was being closed down and being replaced with a 42-story skyscraper. Gaga revealed that Roseland was the only venue in New York City that she had never played, although she had visited there previously to watch shows. A poster announcing the event was released, showing an old image of Gaga taken before the time she became successful as a recording artist.

As an homage to the venue, the stage was decorated with roses. The multi-leveled set-up consisted of New York City fire escape routes. Other parts of the stage had a ladder reaching the mezzanine floors and a replica of an F train carriage. Gaga's wardrobe was also rose themed, with leotards, hats and jackets, and instruments adorned with red roses. The main set list for the residency encompassed songs from The Fame, The Fame Monster, Born This Way, and Artpop. Some tracks were performed in acoustic versions.

The residency received positive reviews from music critics. Reviewers were impressed by Gaga's vocals, the choreography, and the overall presentation of the residency. The shows were sold out with ticket prices being above the average costs of tickets at the venue. Billboard revealed that the seven dates had sold a total of 24,532 tickets while grossing a total of $1.5 million. Two performances from the residency were transmitted on the Late Show with David Letterman, while MTV and Logo TV collaborated to show the behind-the-scenes logistics for the residency. The final show on April 7, 2014, was live-streamed by Verizon Communications.

== Background and announcement ==
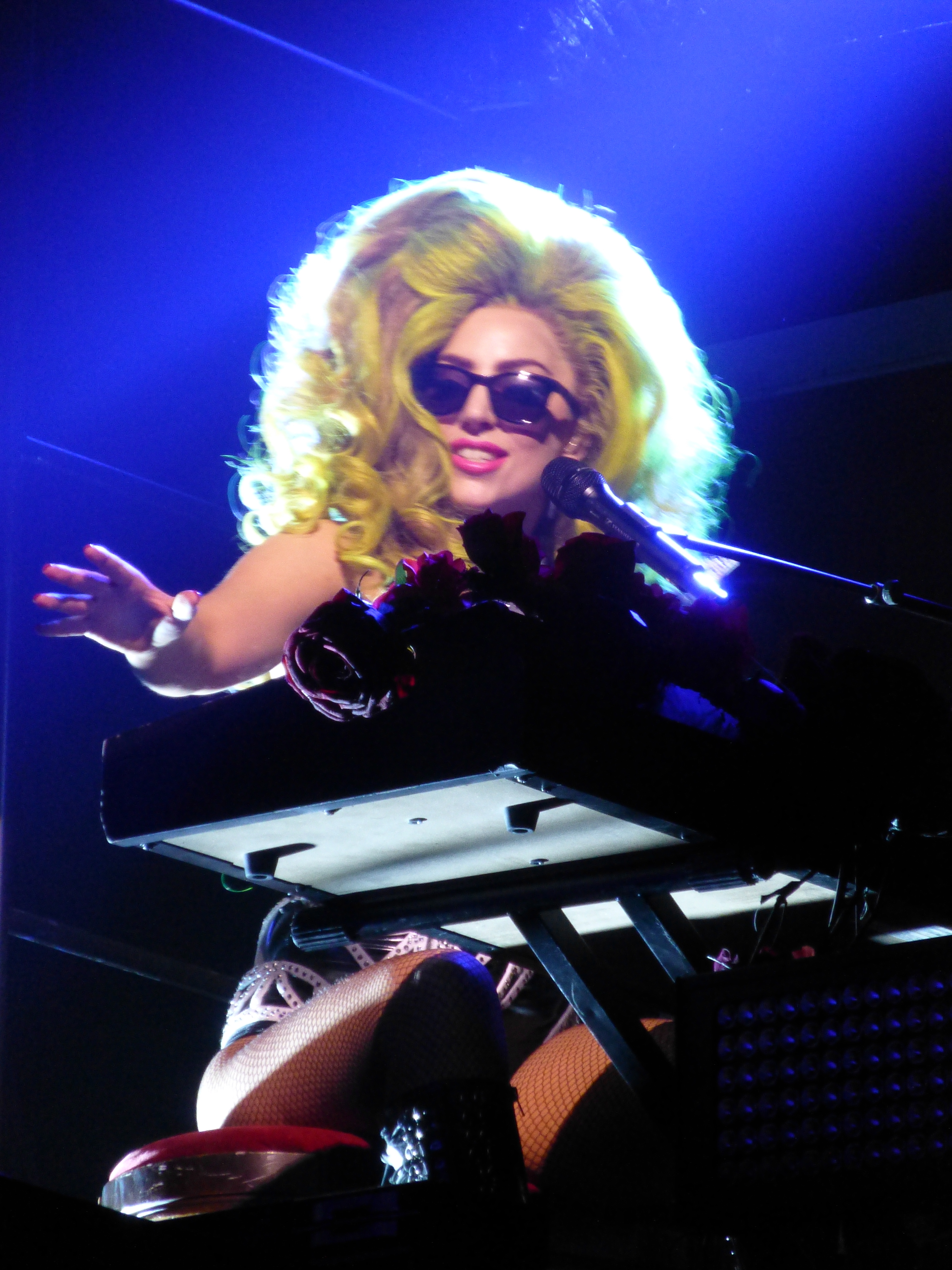
Gaga began the residency with an acoustic performance of "Born This Way"

The Roseland Ballroom opened in its first Manhattan location at 51st Street in 1919, after moving from Philadelphia. It moved to its current location at 52nd Street in 1956, as a converted skating rink. The venue began as a hall for ballroom dancing and orchestra groups, but later shifted its focus through various eras of popular music, including disco, grunge, and EDM. While the Roseland Ballroom has seen performances from a both up-and-coming bands and established acts, rumors have been circulating since 1996 about the venue's demise, after owner Albert Ginsberg filed plans to tear down its low-rise, three-story structure and replace it with a 59-story high-rise. It was announced on October 19, 2013, that the Roseland Ballroom would be closing in April 2014, after over 50 years of operation at its current location.

On November 19, 2013, it was revealed that Gaga would perform the final shows there with an intimate, four-night residency on March 28, March 30, March 31, and April 2, 2014. Tickets went on sale through Ticketmaster on November 25; tickets were priced at $50 for the floor and $200 for the mezzanine. Members of Gaga's fan club were able to register for first access to tickets starting on November 19. Users were selected at random to receive invitations and codes to purchase tickets on November 21. Citi card members also had access to the pre-sale starting November 22.

According to Gaga, playing at the Roseland Ballroom was always a personal dream. She explained to John Seabrook of The New Yorker that "It's basically the only room in the city I haven't played." As a young girl, she could not afford tickets, but she did manage to win free tickets to a Franz Ferdinand show during her senior year of high school. Gaga recalled that she fell in the mosh pit during the show and got her nose broken, making her parents forbid her from visiting Roseland again. After the singer's career took off with the release of debut album, The Fame (2008), she bypassed playing the venue.

Gaga revealed the official poster for the residency on March 18, 2014. It features an image of her taken by a stranger in 2008 on the Lower East Side of Manhattan. According to Gaga: "We found him and used that same photo for my Roseland poster." The poster also includes a quote from her taken when the photograph was taken, that reads: "I'm Lady Gaga. A singer/songwriter. You're going to know me one day."

== Development and inspiration ==
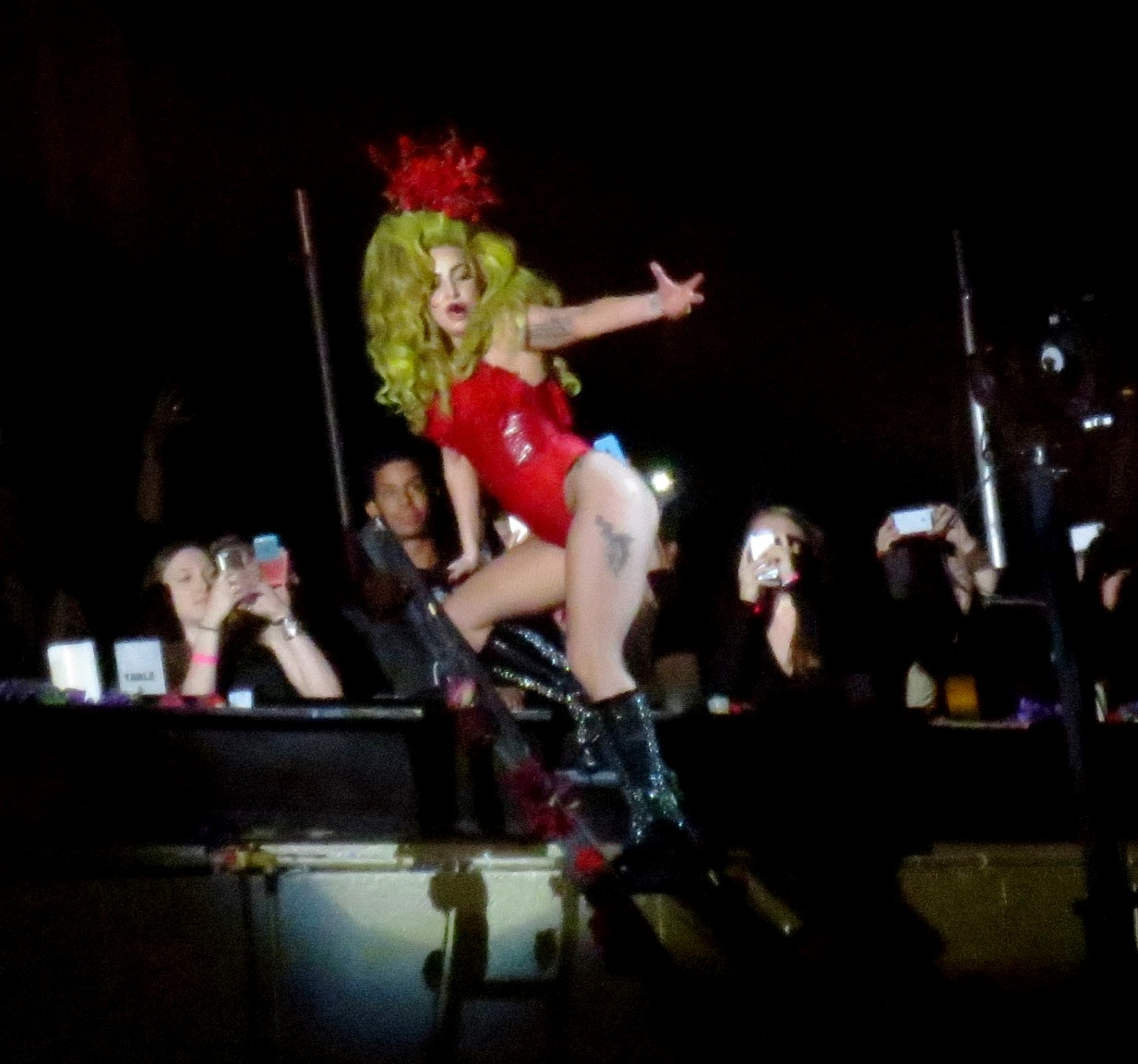
During the performance of "Bad Romance", Gaga climbed a set of stairs to the mezzanine floors

Thematically, both the stage set up and the wardrobe consisted of many roses and was an homage to the venue and the name "Roseland". Starting from arriving to the concert hall in a nude bodysuit and mask, embellished with red roses, the outfits worn on the stage included Gaga's characteristic attire from her previous live performances. One dress consisted of purple-colored hot pants, fishnets, and a mask, all covered with purple roses, along with a metallic purple jacket. Photographer Terry Richardson took photos of the backstage activities which revealed that a second purple jacket was also worn by Gaga and it was bejeweled and emblazoned with the word "Gaga" on the rear side. The instruments used by the singer, such as a keyboard, was also decked similarly with red roses. Another dress included shoulder spikes reminiscent of the singer's attire during her first studio album era, coupled with a hat made of black roses. A green colored wig was also worn by Gaga which she had introduced during the Artpop era. Gaga's vocal coach Don Lawrence, who began working with her when she was 13, assisted her before each show, either by being present there or through phone. Gaga practiced her vocal warm-ups one hour prior to the start of each show.

The stage was created to embody the New York City fire escapes making it multi-leveled and comparable to the self-titled album cover by rock band Grateful Dead. It had a large red curtain to hide it from the audience and was similarly decked with roses. A rose-draped ladder was placed at the left side of the stage which helped Gaga climb the mezzanine floors. A catwalk was constructed behind the stage, which was lined with more roses, and her dancers performed on them. A piano was placed in front of a window representing Gaga's old apartment in New York City. The Lower East Side was represented by the replica of a F train carriage on the auxiliary platform of Roseland named as the "Artpop Zone", decked with neon lights and spelling out "176 Stanton Street", Gaga's old address. A confetti cannon was also kept for the performance of "Applause" and the giant disco ball of the venue was used.

== Concert synopsis ==
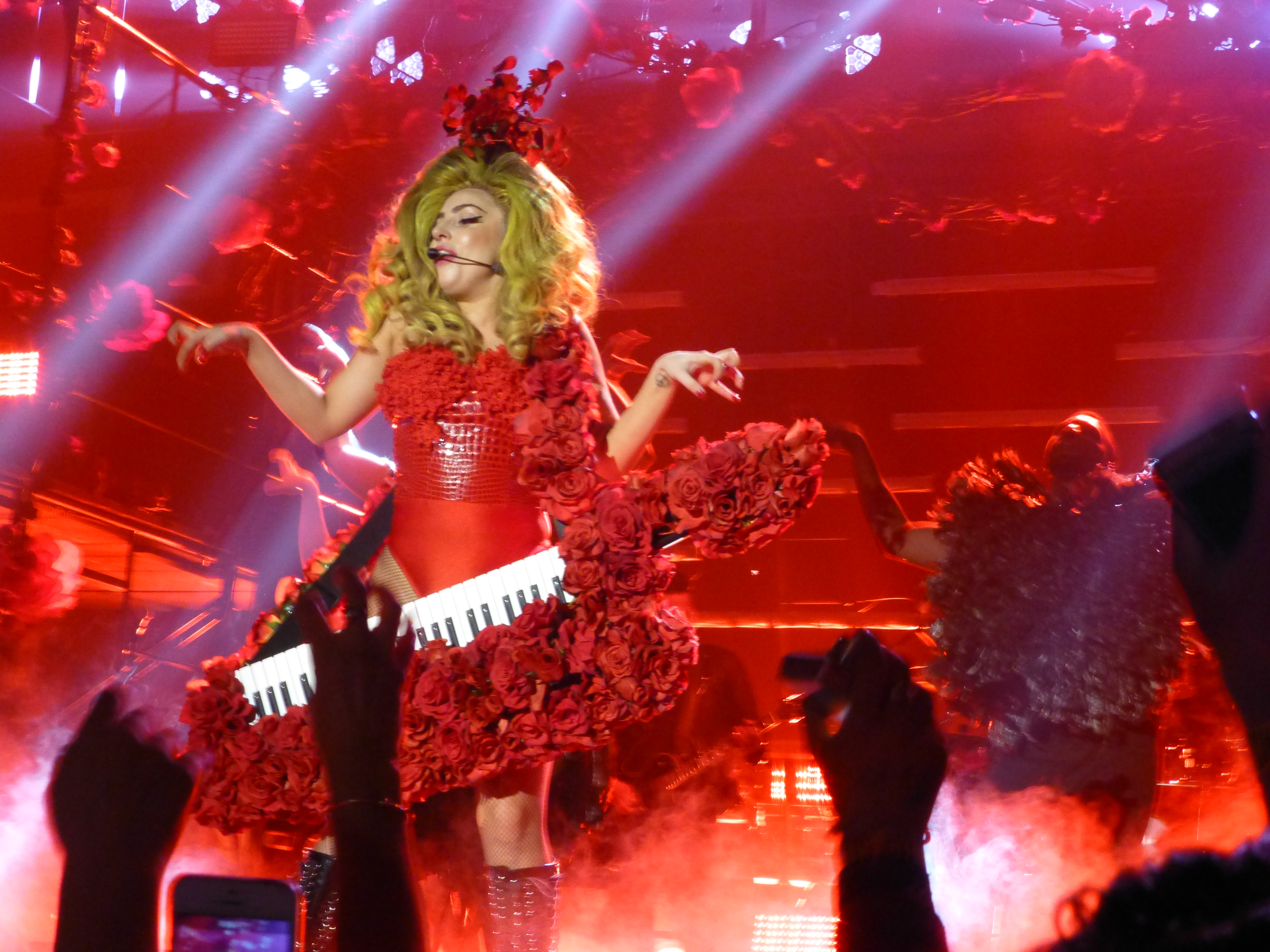
Gaga and her dancer holding the rose adorned keytar during the performance of "Monster"

The main set list for the residency included songs from The Fame, The Fame Monster, Born This Way, and Artpop. The show began with Gaga appearing on top of the platforms and danced towards her piano to perform an acoustic version of "Born This Way", before proceeding to dance on the rafters with her backup troupe to "Black Jesus + Amen Fashion" in her purple leotard and jacket. A costume change ensued and Gaga performed "Monster" wearing a crimson leather body suit and roses atop her head. She played the rose-adorned keytar and gradually segued into "Bad Romance". Middle of the performance, she ran to the left of the stage to climb a ladder to the mezannine floors, where she sang the final chorus and "Sexxx Dreams" followed with energetic dance moves.

Gaga moved towards the F train stage on the right, and sang the piano ballads "Dope" and "You and I", interspersed with monologues about the venue, her beginnings as a singer in New York and addictions. The third costume change took place with the performance of "Just Dance", where she wore yellow hot pants and metallic chest plates, while being accompanied by her full troupe of nine dancers. An intermediate break was introduced with Gaga playing another keytar. "Poker Face" followed, being played by Gaga on the piano. The song was rearranged to include lyrics about the venue and New York. "Artpop" was then played as an interlude.

The final song of the set was "Applause", where Gaga wore another costume, this time the purple bikini and jacket. Towards the end of the performance, confetti rained on the audience and after a brief interlude Gaga appeared in a white jumpsuit for an encore of "G.U.Y." The singer showed provocative dance moves while straddling her backup performers, and executed choreography similar to the song's music video. The show ended with Gaga and her troupe taking a bow to the audience and thanking Roseland.

== Critical reception ==
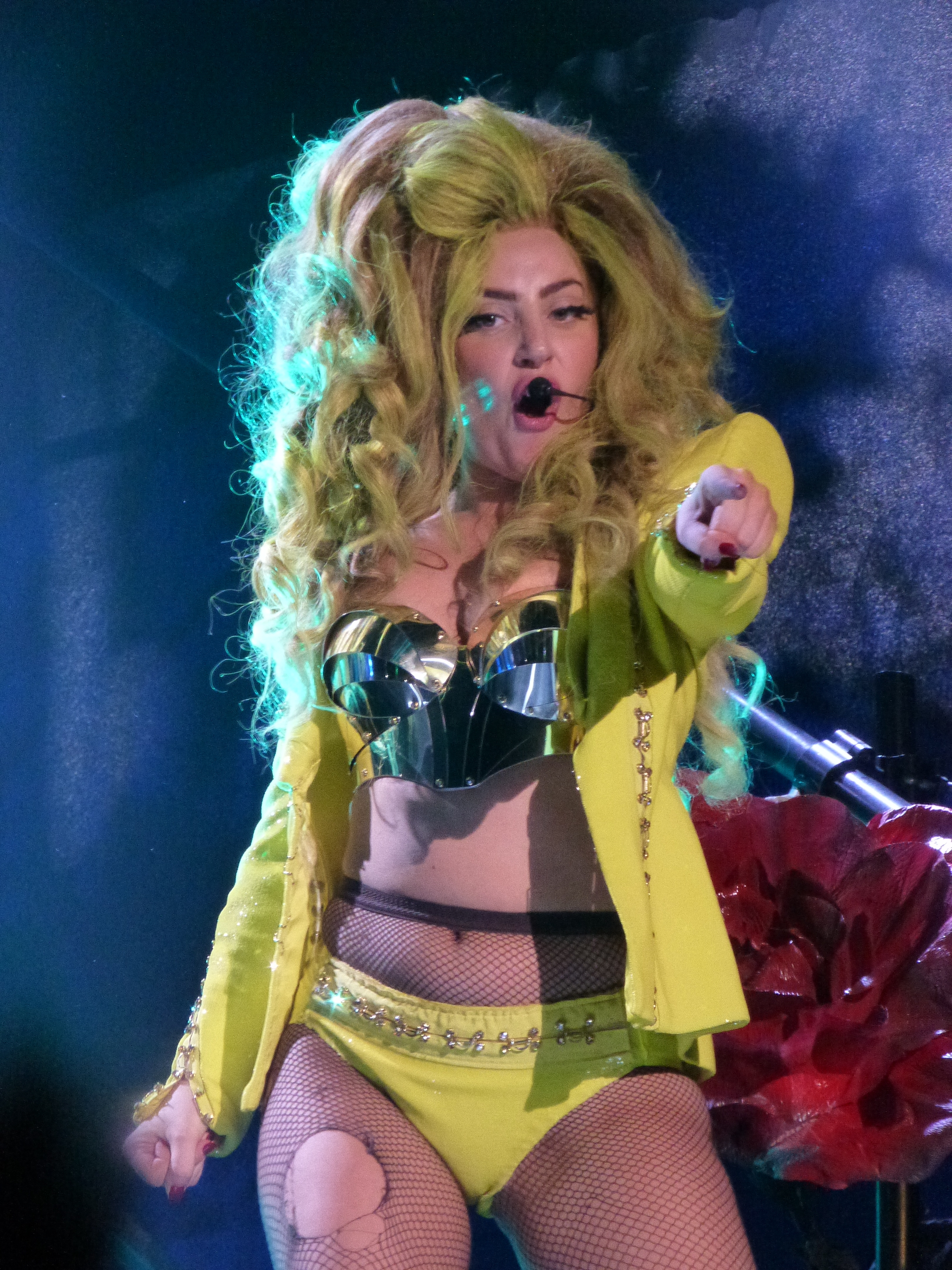
Gaga during her performance of "Just Dance"

Andrew Hammp of Billboard called the residency "electrifying" though he felt that "If SXSW served as a statement about how brands should fund artists' creative expression, Gaga's Roseland residency was about giving the people what they wanted. ... . [The] night ended rather abruptly after almost exactly 60 minutes". A writer for The Courier called the show "short but sweet" and praised her for never showing "signs of slowing down" throughout the show. James Montgomery of MTV News praised the overall show, calling it "heavy on the hits, sublimely sexual, suitably sentimental—both for her glory days and the iconic venue she's closing with this seven-night stand—and ridiculous in all the right ways". He noted that the abrupt ending of the show was compensated by Gaga's dancing and singing, which in turn helped counteract the negative press she had been receiving since the release of Artpop. Glenn Gamboa from Newsday called the show "fierce" and "brainy", saying that the singer "fired up" from the moment she took the stage, displaying an avant-garde artistic sensibility. Jon Caramanica of The New York Times called the show part of the "Supernova" phase of her career and explained,

Gaga grounds this sort of spectacle with her voice. She is still a fearsome singer when she chooses to be, which is to say rarely on records but often in concert ... What she gave the faithful was easy to digest: largely bulletproof pop, swinging back and forth between brooding, panting torch songs delivered at top volume and grand-scale 1980s-style digital rock with a nightclub twist.

Adam Markovitz from Entertainment Weekly declared that if the "Roseland show is any indication, Gaga's not going anywhere anytime soon", in spite of the overall negative reception towards her campaigns for Artpop. He welcomed the absence of any art-related things in the show and commended the focus on music, Gaga's vocals and abilities as an entertainer. Markovitz also complimented Gaga's rapport with the audience members and rated the performances of "Just Dance" and "Bad Romance" as highlights. Markos Papadatos from Digital Journal website declared Gaga as a "pop muse" for the performances. He complimented the choice of songs in the set list calling them "eclectic" and felt they "displayed different sides to her craft". He noticed that the singer's vocal abilities were particularly prominent during the acoustic performances on piano. Caryn Ganz from Rolling Stone observed that the compact space of Roseland did not allow for much choreography, but felt Gaga's performance was "magical", especially during "You and I".

Hilary Hughes from USA Today also noticed Gaga's vocal range, especially during the acoustic interpretation of "Dope" and "Just Dance". Hughes concluded by saying that the simplest moments of the performances were the ones featuring toned down versions of her singles like "Born This Way" and "Poker Face", rather than the extravagant choreography during "Bad Romance" and "G.U.Y." Jordan Runtagh from VH1 applauded Gaga's camaraderie with her fans, also noting that "the abundance of movie cameras reminded us that this was a special moment, one that will go down in history. And not just because these are the last performances at this storied venue. It's something more." Runtagh believed that the performances solidified Gaga as a respectable entertainer and would generate further interest for the upcoming ArtRave: The Artpop Ball tour. Amanda Holpuch from The Guardian complimented Gaga's vocals and her outfits, but felt that the show lacked "something outrageous" from the singer. She added that the most surprising incident of the night was when Gaga climbed a ladder to reach the mezzanine floors and sing from there.

== Commercial reception and broadcasts ==
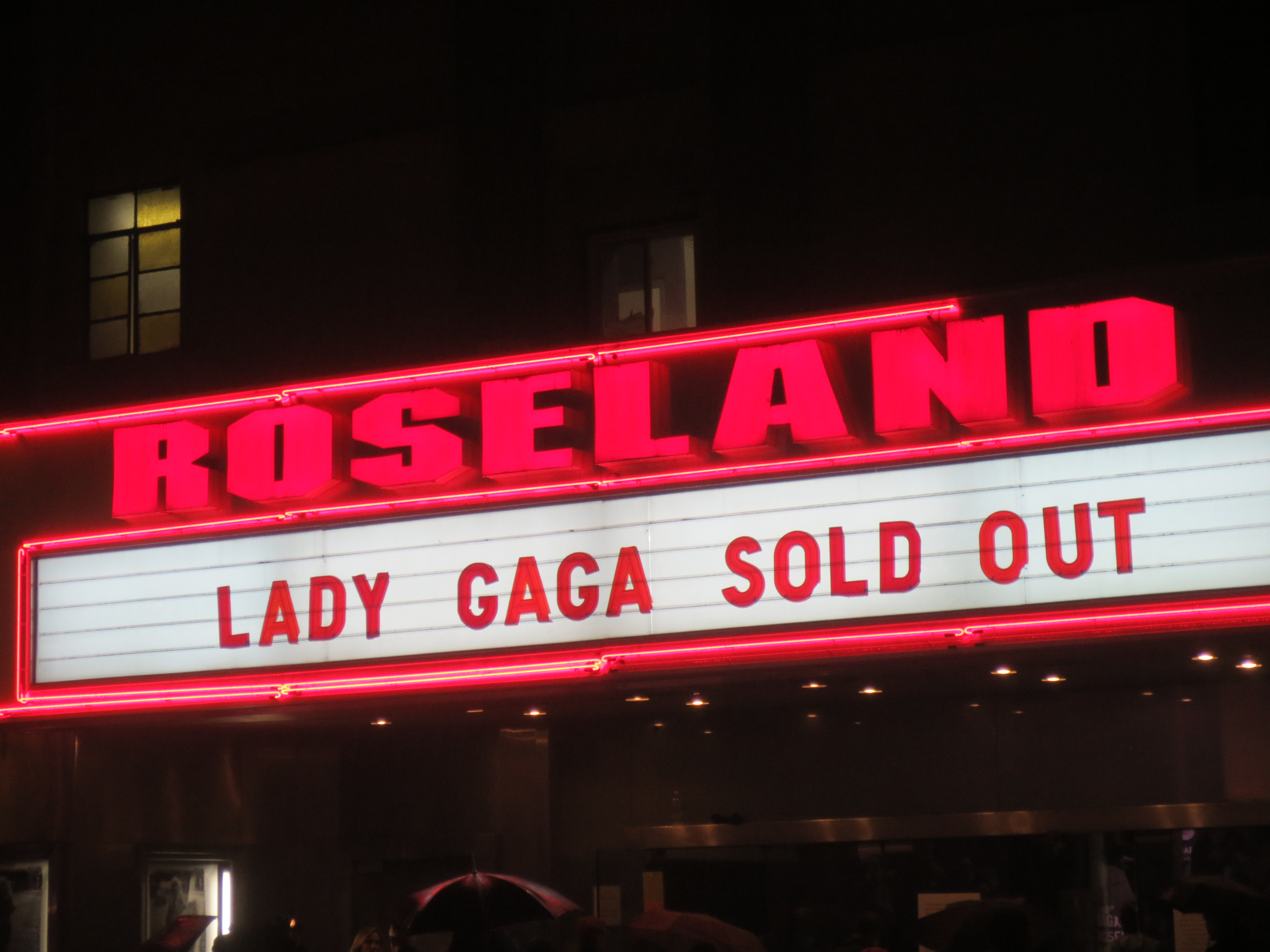
Roseland Ballroom exterior, indicating the sold out Lady Gaga concert

Jesse Lawrence from Forbes reported that the first and last shows at the venue were completely sold out, making it the two most expensive shows for Gaga's economically secondary market. The average ticket price for the secondary market ($375.89) as well as the final show ($195.80) were all above the average cost of $186.40, with the price dropping as the shows drew nearer. Since Roseland was an admission only venue, costlier tickets were kept for the "Artpop Zone" since it had better views and seating arrangement, as well as a post-show meet and greet with Gaga. In April 2014, Jesse Lawrence from Forbes reported that following Gaga's performance at Roseland Ballroom, the tour ticket prices for her ArtRave: The Artpop Ball tour in the secondary markets went up by 5.3%, with major increase being visible at Philips Arena of Atlanta. Tickets at Madison Square Garden rose up to $338.81, which was 42.6% higher than the average price. Other locations were ticket prices saw an increase were MGM Grand Garden Arena in Las Vegas, TD Garden Arena in Boston and United Center in Chicago. In June 2014, Billboard revealed that the seven dates had sold a total of 24,532 tickets while grossing a total of $1.5 million. It ranked at number 41 on the list.

On April 2, 2014, Gaga appeared on the Late Show with David Letterman along with guest Bill Murray. After the interview, the singer invited the whole audience to come and watch the show with her; the performances of "G.U.Y." and "Dope" were presented during the broadcast. MTV and Logo TV collaborated to air various aspects of the preparation for the Roseland shows on April 4. The behind-the-scenes program would air throughout the day on both channels, including the regular programming on partner channels like MTV Hits. Sway Calloway, an interviewer working with MTV News, had access to the background logistics of the show including rehearsals. They also visited Gaga's old apartment, and looked at some of the art collection sent to the singer by her fans. The programs were streamed on MTV's website as well as Gaga's artist page, and the various social media channels owned by Logo. The final performance at Roseland on April 7, 2014, was live streamed for those not able to see the show. Verizon Communications had announced that the event would be streamed from 9 pm EST at the website GetMoreGaga.com. Gaga herself announced the news in a video posted on her Twitter account.

== Set list ==
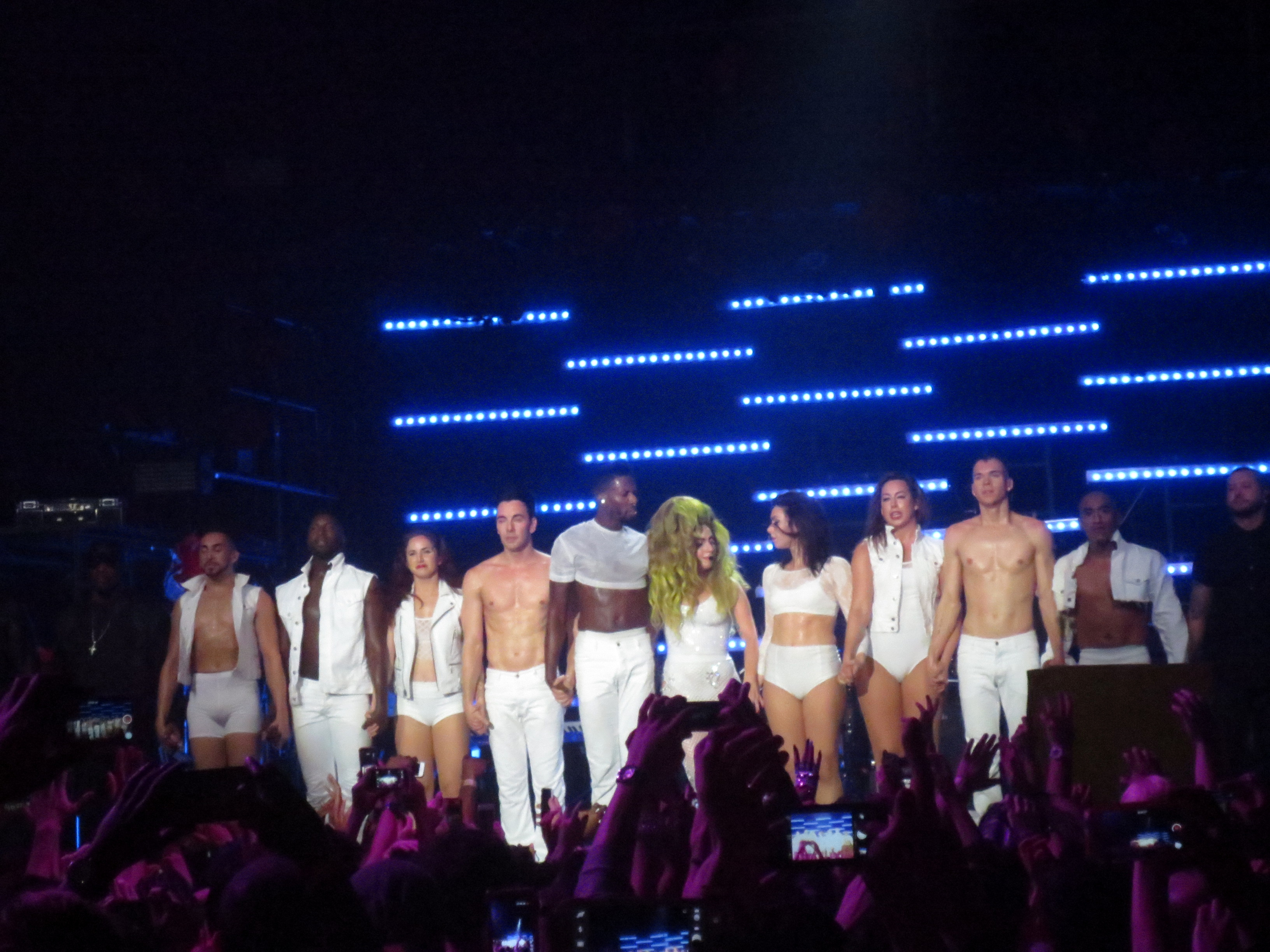
Gaga and her backup dancers take a bow after the final song, "G.U.Y.", at Roseland Ballroom

The following set list is representative of the show's opening night on March 28, 2014.

1. "Born This Way"
2. "Black Jesus + Amen Fashion"
3. "Monster"
4. "Bad Romance"
5. "Sexxx Dreams"
6. "Dope"
7. "You and I"
8. "Just Dance"
9. "Poker Face"
10. "Applause"

Encore

11. "G.U.Y."

== Shows ==
List of concerts, showing date, opening act, tickets sold, number of available tickets and amount of gross revenue
Date	Opening act	Attendance	Revenue
North America
March 28, 2014	Lady Starlight	24,532 / 24,532 (100%)	$1,522,800
March 30, 2014	Lady Starlight	24,532 / 24,532 (100%)	$1,522,800
March 31, 2014	Lady Starlight	24,532 / 24,532 (100%)	$1,522,800
April 2, 2014	Lady Starlight	24,532 / 24,532 (100%)	$1,522,800
April 4, 2014	Lady Starlight	24,532 / 24,532 (100%)	$1,522,800
April 6, 2014	Lady Starlight	24,532 / 24,532 (100%)	$1,522,800
April 7, 2014	Lady Starlight	24,532 / 24,532 (100%)	$1,522,800
