= G.U.Y. =

Single by Lady Gaga

from the album Artpop
- Released: March 22, 2014
- Studio: Record Plant (Hollywood)
- Genre: EDM
- Length: 3:52
- Label: Streamline; Interscope
- Songwriters: Lady Gaga; Anton Zaslavski
- Producers: Zedd; Lady Gaga

Lady Gaga singles chronology
| "Do What U Want" (2013) | "G.U.Y." (2014) | "Anything Goes" (2014) |

Music video
- "G.U.Y." on YouTube

"G.U.Y." (a backronym for "Girl Under You") is a song by American singer Lady Gaga from her third studio album, Artpop (2013). She co-wrote and co-produced the song with Zedd. It debuted on French radio as the album's third and final single on March 22, 2014. "G.U.Y." was developed while Gaga was touring with her Born This Way Ball, and was recorded a number of times for the final version. It is an EDM track containing elements of industrial, contemporary R&B, and house music whose lyrics address a number of subjects like sexual dominance, submission, and gender roles.

"G.U.Y." received mixed reviews from music critics, who complimented the composition of the track and Gaga's vocals, but criticized her production. The song debuted on the record charts of a few countries, but failed to enter the top forty in many of them. In the United States, "G.U.Y." became one of Gaga's lowest charting singles on the Billboard Hot 100, peaking at number 76. It reached the top ten on Bulgarian airplay chart, the Billboard Greek Digital Songs chart, and the US Hot Dance Club Songs chart.

The music video for the song was shot at Hearst Castle, located near San Simeon. The video featured reality TV show stars like The Real Housewives of Beverly Hills, and works of artist Nathan Sawaya and Minecraft YouTuber SkyDoesMinecraft. Running for over 11 minutes, the video shows Gaga as a wounded fallen angel who is revived by her followers in a pool. Once rejuvenated, she takes revenge on the men who hunted her and replaces them with clones known as G.U.Y. The video received positive reviews for its visuals and its references to Greek mythology. Gaga has performed "G.U.Y." at her seven-day concert residency at Roseland Ballroom in March 2014 and on her ArtRave: The Artpop Ball tour; in both places she emulated the choreography from the music video on stage, and received a positive critical response. Gaga also performed the song on the Late Show with David Letterman on April 2 of the same year.

== Background and development ==
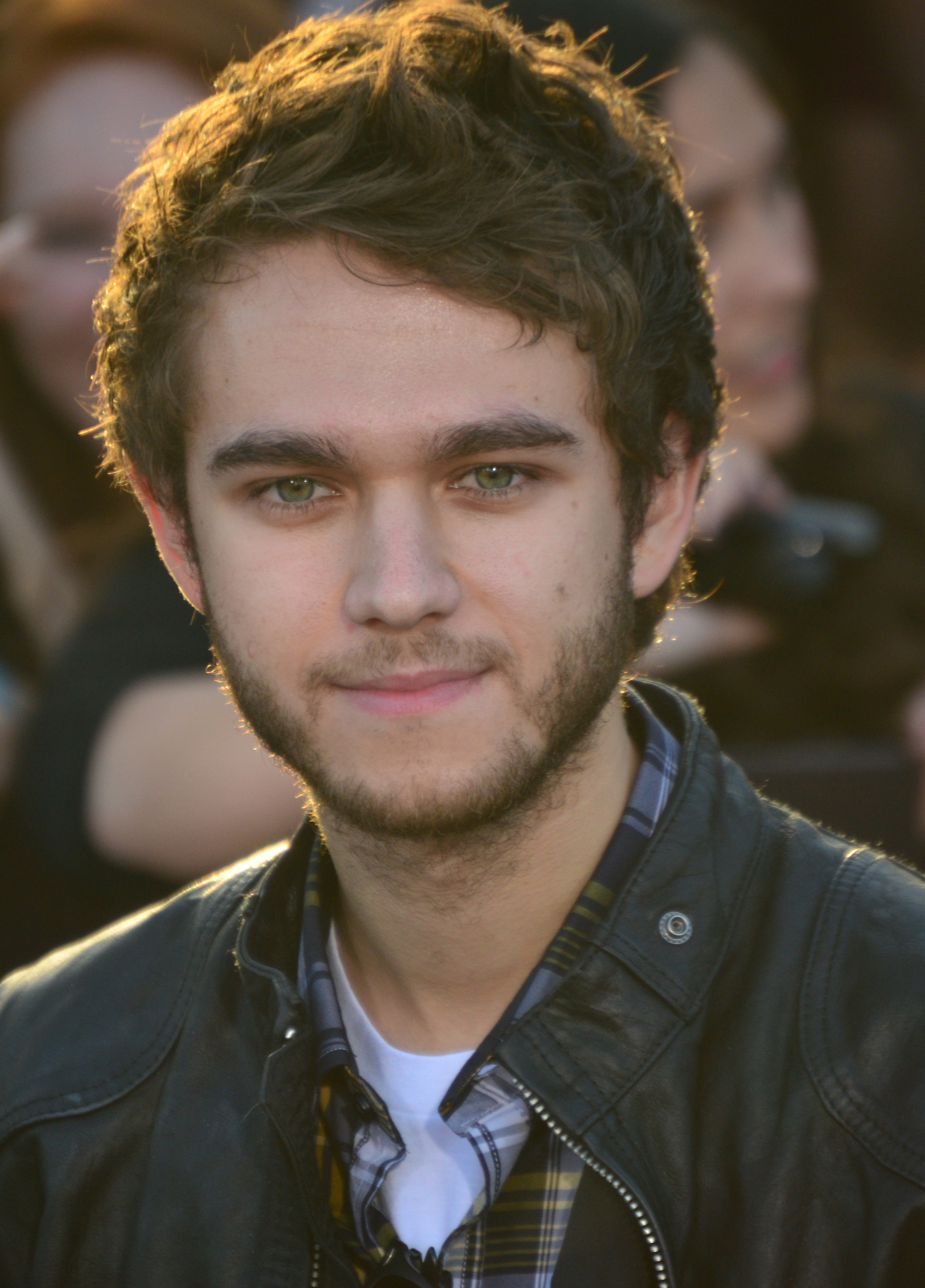
Zedd (pictured) co-wrote and produced "G.U.Y."

Development of Gaga's third studio album, Artpop, began shortly after the release of her second one, Born This Way (2011), and by the following year, the record was already being recorded. "G.U.Y." was confirmed in an interview with Stylist magazine where Joanna McGarry asked Gaga about her views on feminism. Gaga told McGarry that the song is about new-age feminism, which she wanted to explore, where being subordinate to a man is the transfer of strength:

I actually wrote a song about it on my album, it's called 'GUY' and it stands for 'Girl Under You'. So wearing make-up, smelling delicious and having suckable, kissable, edible things between your limbs is something I find strengthening because I know that when I pick the right guy, I can let him have it. Some women feel oppressed by make-up and clothing, and here's to them, they have every right to feel that way as well.

On her social media website Littlemonsters.com, Gaga later corrected the song title, saying that it is actually "G.U.Y.", an acronym for "Girl Under You". She also revealed that the song was written and produced with musician Zedd, who had been touring with Gaga for her Born This Way Ball. Zedd had previously done a remix of her single "Marry the Night" for her remix album, Born This Way: The Remix, and Gaga had contributed vocals on an alternate version of Zedd's track, "Stache". The musician told MTV News that they "both love nothing more than making music, so it was just kind of natural for us to just work on music". He also confirmed that around ten songs were composed with Gaga and was almost finished, although he was not sure which would be available on the final track list for Artpop.

By January 2013, Zedd clarified that due to their busy schedules it was difficult to complete the project and work progressed mainly during the tour. Talking to Sirius XM Radio in December 2013, where she gave an in-depth analysis of each song from the album, Gaga further expanded on the concept of new-wave feminism: "The record's all about being comfortable underneath, because you are strong enough to know that you don't have to be on top to know you're worth it," she concluded.

== Recording and composition ==
Initial recording sessions for Artpop coincided with the Born This Way Ball. Zedd was not happy with the initial outcome of the recordings and so he suggested Gaga to re-do the whole process. Gaga's idea of recording the songs with Zedd was to not limit themselves with the intention of creating a staple radio hit, instead be creative in whichever way they wanted. He explained to Rolling Stone that they did not "try to make an EDM album – but, at the same time, we didn't try not to make an EDM album. I've done a lot of stuff that's really outside of what I usually do. There was one song that started from her just giving me, like, 10 words to describe an emotion, and then I had to make this into music. It's been a very experimental way of approaching music."

"G.U.Y." (2013)
A 25-second sample of "G.U.Y.", where Gaga sings the "Love me, love me, please retweet" line and then the main chorus, "I wanna be that guy (G.U.Y.)", backed by an EDM beat.

The song was recorded at Record Plant Studios, Hollywood, California, by Dave Russell with assistance from Benjamin Ladder. Zedd did the mixing of the track at Zeddl. The instructional voice at the beginning of the song was done by Sonja Durham. Assisting with the whole process was Ryan Shanahan and Jesse Taub. Finally, Rick Pearl did the additional programming and Gene Grimaldi did the audio mastering at Oasis Mastering Studios in Burbank, California.

According to Musicnotes.com, "G.U.Y." is set in the time signature of common time, with a dance-pop tempo of 110 beats per minute. It is composed in the key of C minor with Gaga's vocals spanning the tonal nodes of D_{3} to C_{5}. "G.U.Y." is an EDM song with industrial, R&B, and house elements. Jason Lipshutz of Billboard described the track as a "shuddering dance siren that makes the distinction between gender equality and willful sexual submission". Caryn Ganz from Rolling Stone called the song a "gothy grinder".

Its composition is reminiscent of the songs on Gaga's first album, The Fame (2008), with MTV News' John Walker noticing a number of topics being addressed by the lyrics, including sexual preferences, dominance and submission and gender roles. There is also a glimpse of baroque music in the composition which Ed Power of Hot Press described as landing "its blows with agreeable fervor". The song opens with Gaga playing the role of a hostess, which Maura Johnston of Spin found similar to the 1993 erotic album, Cyborgasm. It begins with a spoken word introduction about Eros, the god of sexual desire.

== Critical response ==
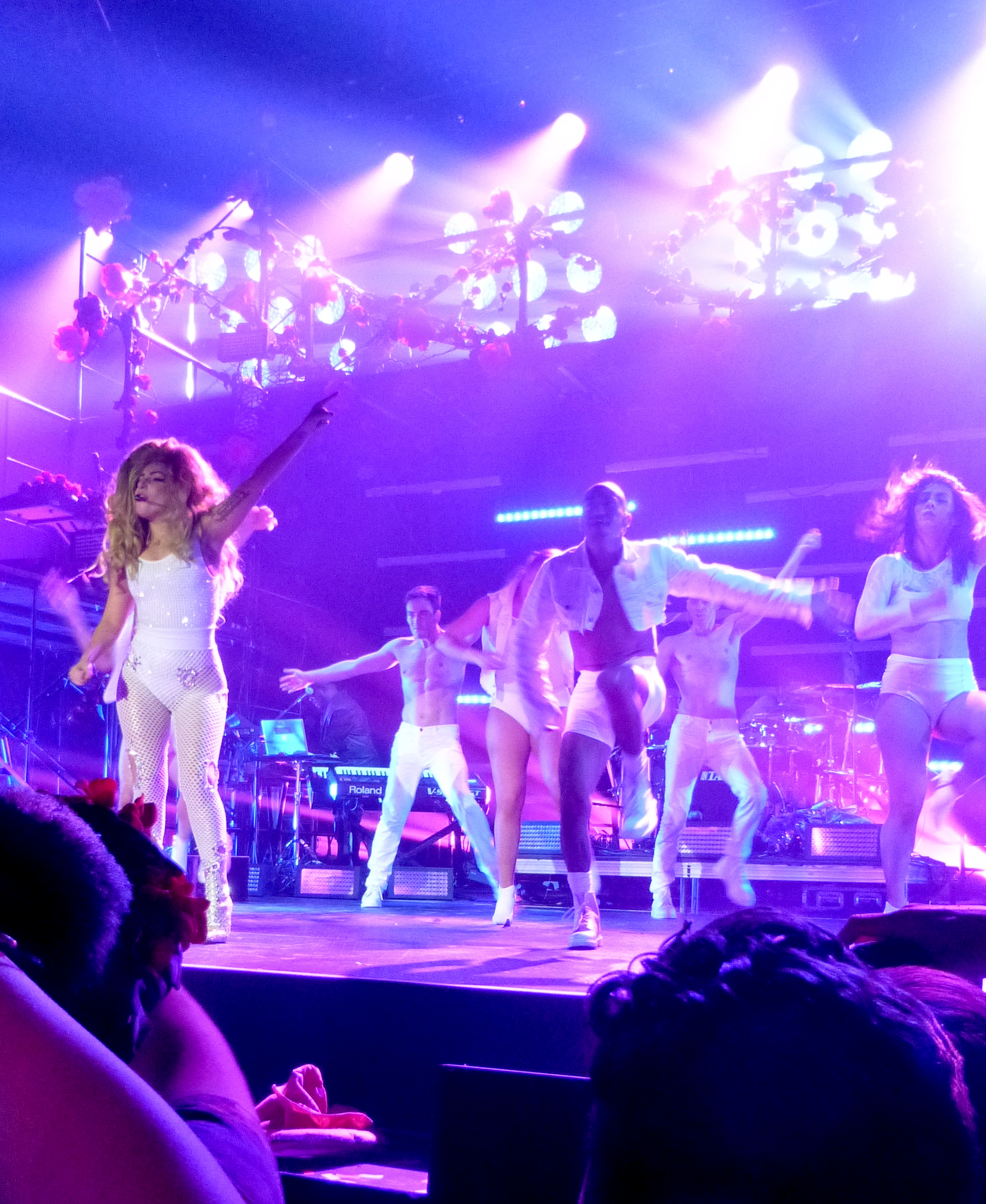
Gaga and her dancers performing "G.U.Y." at the Roseland Ballroom, as part of the singer's seven-day concert residency there

Following its release, "G.U.Y." received mixed reviews from music critics. Positive comment came from Lipshutz, who commended Zedd's production of the song, noticing that it complimented Gaga's vocals and the hook was relatable, making "G.U.Y." the first standout track from Artpop. Robert Copsey from Digital Spy praised the song's "grinding bass and darting synths" and "hypnotic chorus". Andy Gill of The Independent felt that Gaga's "robotic" vocal delivery in the song made the theme of sexual attraction "seem grimly denatured". Walker praised the track's lyrics and gave "G.U.Y" four out of five rating, but was less pleased with its instrumentation. Owen Myers of Dazed & Confused complimented the entendres present in the song, saying that "this pop wonder" would have worked better as the lead single from Artpop. Harper's Bazaar magazine's Justin Miller shared this opinion, and believed that both the dance music composition and the lyrics catered most to the Venus inspiration behind the album. In a retrospective review, Claire Lobenfeld of Pitchfork stated that "G.U.Y." was "Gaga's career-best dance track up until her Ariana Grande-featuring trauma-balm 'Rain on Me' was released in 2020."

Johnson described the song as "a seriously banging pop EP", and a welcome departure from the first two tracks of the album, "Aura" and "Venus". She described the song to be "an ode to taking on the submissive role in a relationship". Stacy-Ann Ellis from Vibe deemed the song "almost clever". Brian Tank from The Buffalo News called the track a "catchy and fun" song which made one "feel happy and dance along". Writing for Fact, William Bennett described the song as incredible. Mikael Wood from Los Angeles Times felt that "G.U.Y." helped the Artpop album have a "fresh" sound. Annie Zalenski of The A.V. Club praised it as one of the album's highlights. The song was called an "instant hit" by Mike Driver from Clash who found the usage of handclaps and the chorus as addictive. Clare Considine from Time Out found the song to be inspired by the work of Madonna and David Bowie, in its "cosmic pansexual playfulness". Brad Wheeler from The Globe and Mail noted the erotic elements associated with the track, jokingly adding that "one imagines Gaga's choreographer is busy at work on the song's live erotica possibilities as we speak."

Negative reviews came from Sal Cinquemani of Slant Magazine, who criticized the song, saying that it did not portray Gaga as an artist moving forward with her music, and did not contribute anything musically to distinguish itself from other sexual songs. Kevin Fallon of The Daily Beast opined that "G.U.Y." is a "complicated" track where the production is so chaotic that it drowned the commendable hook of the song, making it sound like a "whirring bee's nest". Melinda Newman from Hitfix gave the song a "C" rating and criticized its production as "clunky". Preston Jones from Fort Worth Star-Telegram called the song "blunt", and believed that it showed Gaga "has been, all along, more or less creatively bankrupt". Allan Moses Rodricks from The Hindu felt that too much experimenting with the music led to a low quality production on the song. Allison Stewart from The Washington Post criticized the song's lyrics for including "role playing, bad puns, a killer hook". Stewart also characterized it as "highly sexualized, which is different from saying it's sexy, because Gaga's air of sexual detachment rivals Rihanna's." Chris Bosman from Time found the song's sexual themes to be "very similar" and redundant to those from "Venus". Lydia Jenkin from The New Zealand Herald was unsure whether the lyrics were interesting or "just confused".

== Release and artwork ==
A 12-second preview of "G.U.Y." was posted online by Gaga in October 2013 as a preview of songs from Artpop. The part in the snippet was from the, "Love me, love me, please retweet. Let me be the girl under you that makes you cry," line. Interscope Records later uploaded the track "Gypsy" on their SoundCloud account as list of singles they would send for radio play. This led to speculation in the media that "Gypsy" would be released as the third single from Artpop. Gaga also announced plans of shooting a new music video, which tied in with the single rumors. In March 2014, it was announced that the next Artpop single would be "G.U.Y." and that its music video would premiere on NBC's Dateline on March 22. It officially impacted mainstream and rhythmic radio stations in the US on April 8, 2014. A 3:35 radio edit was issued digitally for promotion by Streamline and Interscope Records on March 24, 2014. Universal Music announced that in Italy, the song would be played from March 28, 2014, while BBC Radio 1 declared "G.U.Y." as new music on UK radio from April 21, 2014.

Gaga revealed the official artwork for the single through her Facebook account. It shows the singer in one of the instances from the music video, in a bruised state and sporting big wings behind her. Digital Spy's Lewis Corner described the artwork as "[representing] a phoenix who rises from the ashes." The image is surrounded by the same white border prevalent in the other artworks, like those of "Do What U Want", "Applause", and the promotional single "Dope". Beneath the cover, Gaga revealed that the song title and the artist name were self-written.

== Chart performance ==
Following the release of Artpop, the song debuted and reached a peak of number 42 on the Gaon Music Chart of South Korea, selling 3,362 copies. It debuted as the second-highest new entry on the Billboard Hot 100 at number 76 for the week ending April 13, 2014. Among the total chart points gained, 72% of it was due to streaming activity, enabling it to enter the Streaming Songs chart—one of the component charts for the Hot 100—at number 31 with two million streams following the premiere of the music video on March 22. Nielsen Broadcast Data Systems tracked the streams from the first full week of the music video release, from March 24 to 30. The total point also included the streams from the music video containing only the "G.U.Y." version, which debuted five days later. The total marked a 98% increase in overall streaming activity for the song from the prior tracking week. The release of the video also helped Gaga re-enter the Social 50 chart of Billboard at number 26, with 86% increase in views on her Vevo account, 87% rise in mentions on Twitter, and an 84% gain in conversation on Facebook. Two weeks later, the song debuted at number 35 on the Mainstream Top 40 chart, becoming the second debut of the week. It debuted at number 34 on the Hot Dance Club Songs chart. "G.U.Y." also debuted at number 92 in France, number 88 in Australia and number 115 in the United Kingdom.

== Music video ==
=== Background and production ===
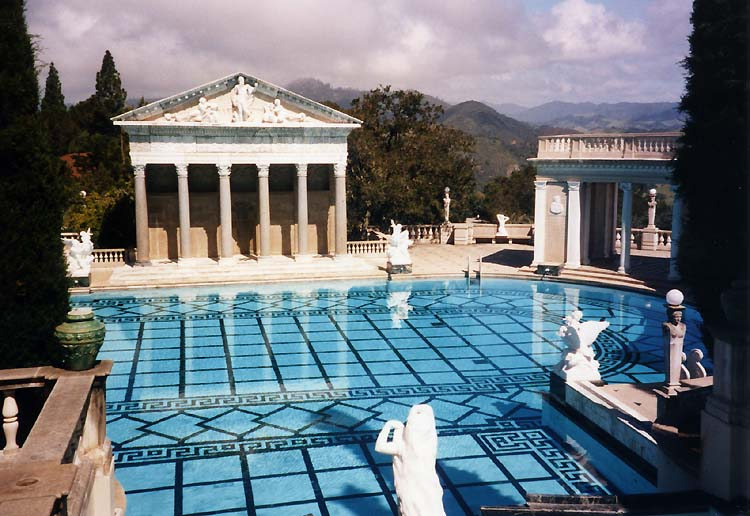
Hearst Castle, where the music video was filmed

The music video, officially titled "G.U.Y. – An Artpop Film", was directed by Gaga herself. In February 2014, it was announced that Gaga had been allowed to shoot for a musical project at Hearst Castle, located near San Simeon, California. The shooting took place from February 11–13, at locations including the 84,000 square feet area of the Castle's main terrace, the Neptune Pool and the indoor Roman Pool. The cast from Bravo channel's reality show The Real Housewives of Beverly Hills (RHOBH) was also seen around the shoot. The news attracted media attention as it was the first time since 1960 that a non-documentary video project was shot there, the last being for Stanley Kubrick's epic film Spartacus; the Deed of gift mandate by the Hearst Corporation prohibited any commercial filming at the location.

Among the accessories shown, the wings worn in the video were made by Jim Henson Studios and her own creative team, Haus of Gaga, created the arrows. Gaga told Access Hollywood about the shoot at Hearst Castle and the main idea behind the video: "It was a great experience writing the treatment working with everyone and I was like, 'Don't touch anything, and if you knock over a sculpture I'm going to pass out!'. The intention of the video was to create something that was a true sort of road map of my journey, being an artist, a pop singer, a creative person..... It's interesting because in this video the fashion and the psychotic sort of whimsy is all happening around me and it's me almost like Alice in Wonderland going through my own rabbit hole in my brain and re-experiencing the past year of my life. Every moment that we were filming together was really joyous and really fun."

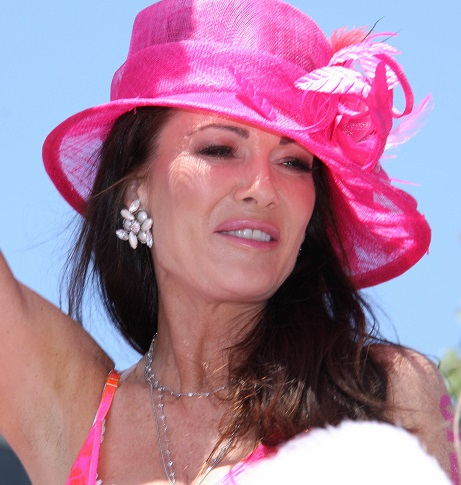
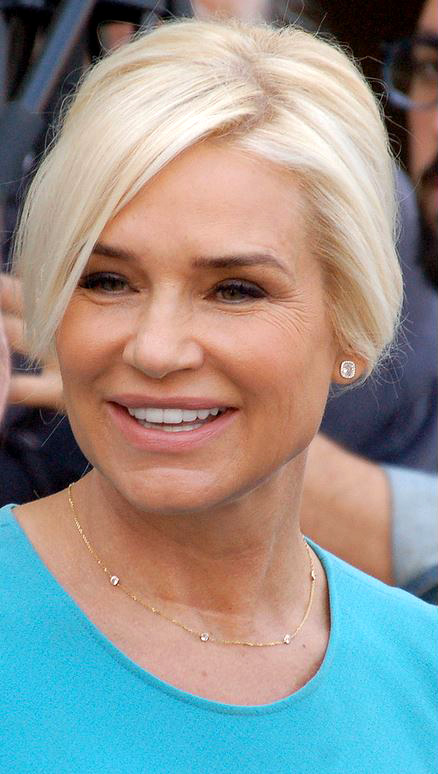
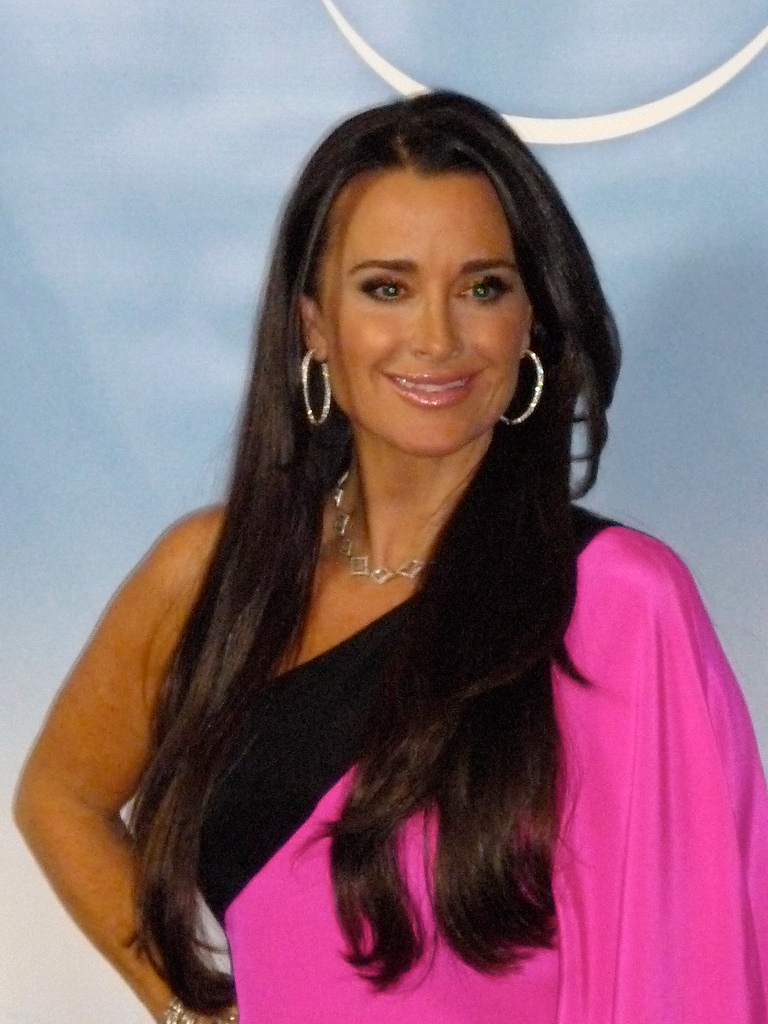
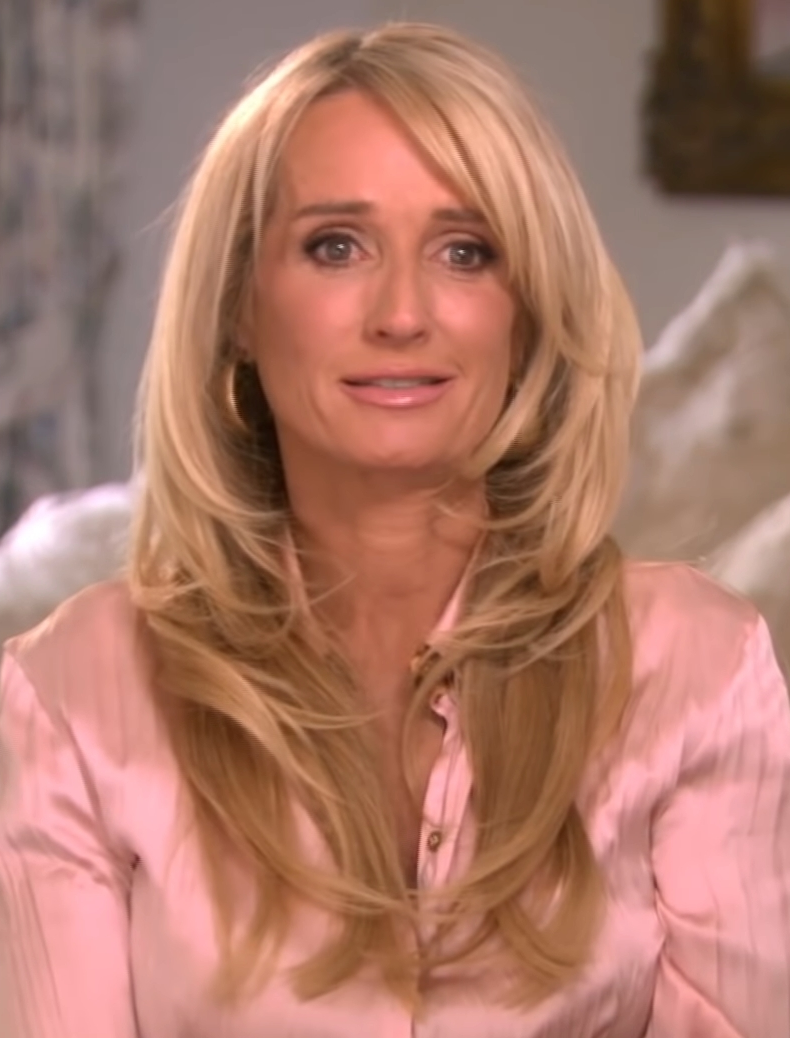
Lisa Vanderpump, Yolanda Foster, Kyle and Kim Richards all appear in the music video for "G.U.Y."

The cast from RHOBH featured included Lisa Vanderpump, Yolanda Foster, Carlton Gebbia, Kyle Richards, and Kim Richards, who acted as instrument players in the video. Initially, the entire cast of the show's fourth season were asked to partake, however, cast members Brandi Glanville and Joyce Giraud both declined as Glanville was promoting her second book in New York City, and Giraud simply declined to appear.

Kyle Richards and Vanderpump accompany Gaga on a different sequence in the video, showing the trio taking revenge against a corporation. Vanderpump explained that they were contacted by Andy Cohen—who himself has a cameo appearance in "G.U.Y."—from Bravo and were signed for side-roles in the video. Richards noticed that Gaga was a perfectionist on the set, with Vanderpump saying that the singer took charge of every detail of the production. They explained to The Hollywood Reporter that Gaga wanted the housewives to "feel and look beautiful and fierce" and during one of the homicide scenes she explained: "I want you to whip that ponytail even more. Go back and really exaggerate your head-flipping'. I was like, 'Whatever you say'. [Vanderpump] To get me into a lace bodysuit, there's not many people I'd do that for. I'm 53 years old, for God's sake. She said, 'This is what you're wearing'." Richards personally wanted to play the guitar since she had been taking lessons.

Gaga also used the 3D game Minecraft in a sequence and enlisted Minecraft YouTuber SkyDoesMinecraft in a sequence which depicts the singer reviving famous men who have been dead. The artist had been a fan of the game since Martyn Littlewood of The Yogscast used it to create a parody of her 2011 single, "Born This Way", which she appreciated. Minecraft and Lego were also used to create little items like fruits and chairs in the video. The 3D theme also expanded onto using artist Nathan Sawaya's Lego sculpture Yellow—which showed a man ripping his chest out—in a sequence showing Gaga's head being transposed on the artpiece. Sawaya recalled that Gaga had contacted him for collaborating on the music video. They mutually agreed on the idea of making art "accessible" and decided on the different sculptures to be created, including a duplicate of Yellow, without the head. Sawaya then traveled to Hearst Castle to install the art pieces for the shoot. Multiple designer dresses were also used in the video namely, a white ensemble with a giant headpiece by Jean Paul Gaultier, jeans by Versace, a red swimsuit by La Perla and a black one by Madrid label POL, jewelry from Lynn Ban, and custom made sandals form Ruthie Davis. The homicide scenes showed designs by Helen Yarmak, lace bodysuits by Somarta and Aturo Rios feathered headpiece. Designer Bea Szenfeld created a dress from paper resembling a teddy bear as well as other couture. Finally, gold colored latex body suit created by Atsuko Kudo was also work by Gaga, as well as gold garments for her backup dancers.

=== Release and synopsis ===
Gaga with her face superimposed on the art piece called "Yellow" by Lego-brick artist Nathan Sawaya, who created a custom made version of the art piece without the head, only for Gaga

On March 14, 2014, Gaga revealed during her keynote speech with John Norris at SXSW that she would release the video a week later. She also tweeted a still from the clip with a caption about the release date. A preview of the clip aired on March 21, during an interview with Savannah Guthrie for Today. The video debuted in full on Dateline NBC a day later. To coincide with the release of the video, The Out NYC hotel changed their name temporarily to The G.U.Y. Hotel and would keep it till April 10, 2014. Located in Midtown New York, the hotel also opened a Gaga Gallery which started from March 28 (Gaga's birthday) and showcased the props and dresses included in the music video.

Running for nearly twelve minutes, the video features the four songs "Artpop", "Venus", "G.U.Y" and "Manicure" from Artpop and features the central video for "G.U.Y." The video opens with corporate business men fighting each other over money. Nearby, a fallen angel (played by Gaga) has been shot out of the sky with an arrow. The instrumental of her song "Artpop" plays in the background. The men run off and Gaga crawls to safety, removing the arrow from her chest. Gaga makes it to her feet and travels to a palace, where she collapses at the front door and is scraped up by the guards. "Venus" begins as she is carried down to the pool, where people cover her in flowers and put her into the water to heal her.

"G.U.Y." begins as Gaga rises again in a white dress, reborn as a Greek goddess of sorts and the song begins to play. Shots of Gaga in different outfits, including a blue dress and white bikini are shown with dance sequences. Andy Cohen and the stars of The Real Housewives of Beverly Hills make cameos in the video. A scene featuring Gaga rolling around on a seashell bed in a red outfit, dancing in a gold leotard with arrows, and floating on a bed in a pool is shown throughout the song. With the help of YouTuber SkyDoesMinecraft (also making their cameo appearance), Michael Jackson, Mahatma Gandhi, John Lennon, and Jesus are resurrected using the game Minecraft and their blood is used to create clones known as "G.U.Y." Gaga, Vanderpump, and Richards are seen coming out of a car in black outfits, shooting money cannons, and walking down the hallway to kill corporate executives to replace with G.U.Y. clones. The video ends with thousands of these clones marching out of the castle. The credits section of the video then features "Manicure" playing.

=== Reception and analysis ===
"It's really up for interpretation by anyone that watches it. There's some artistic images and just some really pop images and I think the trick is to kind of watch it a few times and you'll catch something different each time. But it's ok to be confused because the intention was for there to be a hallucinogenic quality to when you watch it, like Pop Culture Acid."

— Gaga talking on SiriusXM about the different themes in the video.

Adam Markovitz from Entertainment Weekly was impressed by the grandiose of the video calling it "camp-pop delirium". He compared it with director Jean Cocteau's films and proposed different theories as to the plot of the video, including ode to old and new Hollywood and a satire of "corporate subservience". This view was shared by Whitney Phaneuf from HitFix who called it a "heavy dose of camp and pop culture". Marissa G. Muller from MTV News commended the fashion, the choreography, the appearance of RHOBH in the video, and all who worked in it in the credits, saying "While it's a humbling move to put the spotlight on everyone else's contributions, it's also a reminder of how truly epic this production is. It's gonna be really hard for Gaga to out-Gaga this one."

MuuMuse's Bradley Stern described the video as "an eye-popping 7-minute deep dive into astonishing new levels of self-importance and certifiable insanity." The video was also noted as Gaga's most ambitious project since those for her previous singles "Bad Romance" and "Telephone". Kevin Rutherford from Billboard said that Gaga "has no problem attaching art to music" and that "she's not showing signs of stopping anytime soon with her new music video." Isaiah Thomas from El Espectador noted that the video was a response by Gaga against accusations of "selling out" to the corporate world. Especially the ending of the video justified this with Gaga murdering the corporate heads who supposedly destroyed her freedom in the beginning of the video. Dharmic X from Complex described the release as "vibrant" and "leftfield", as is expected from a release by Gaga. Samantha Grossman from Time expected the video to be full of the strange imagery and the extravagant costumes, making it "bizarre".

Negative reviews came from Slant Magazine's Sal Cinquemani, who found the plot to be "muddled", ultimately deducing that the final output was "unsexy" for a song talking about sexual submissiveness. Cinquemani found inspirations from the 1952 musical film Million Dollar Mermaid, in the scenes involving synchronized swimming. Contactmusic.com's Elinor Cosgrave highlighted the video's "mix of symbolism", though criticized the references to Christ and rebirth.

== Live performances ==
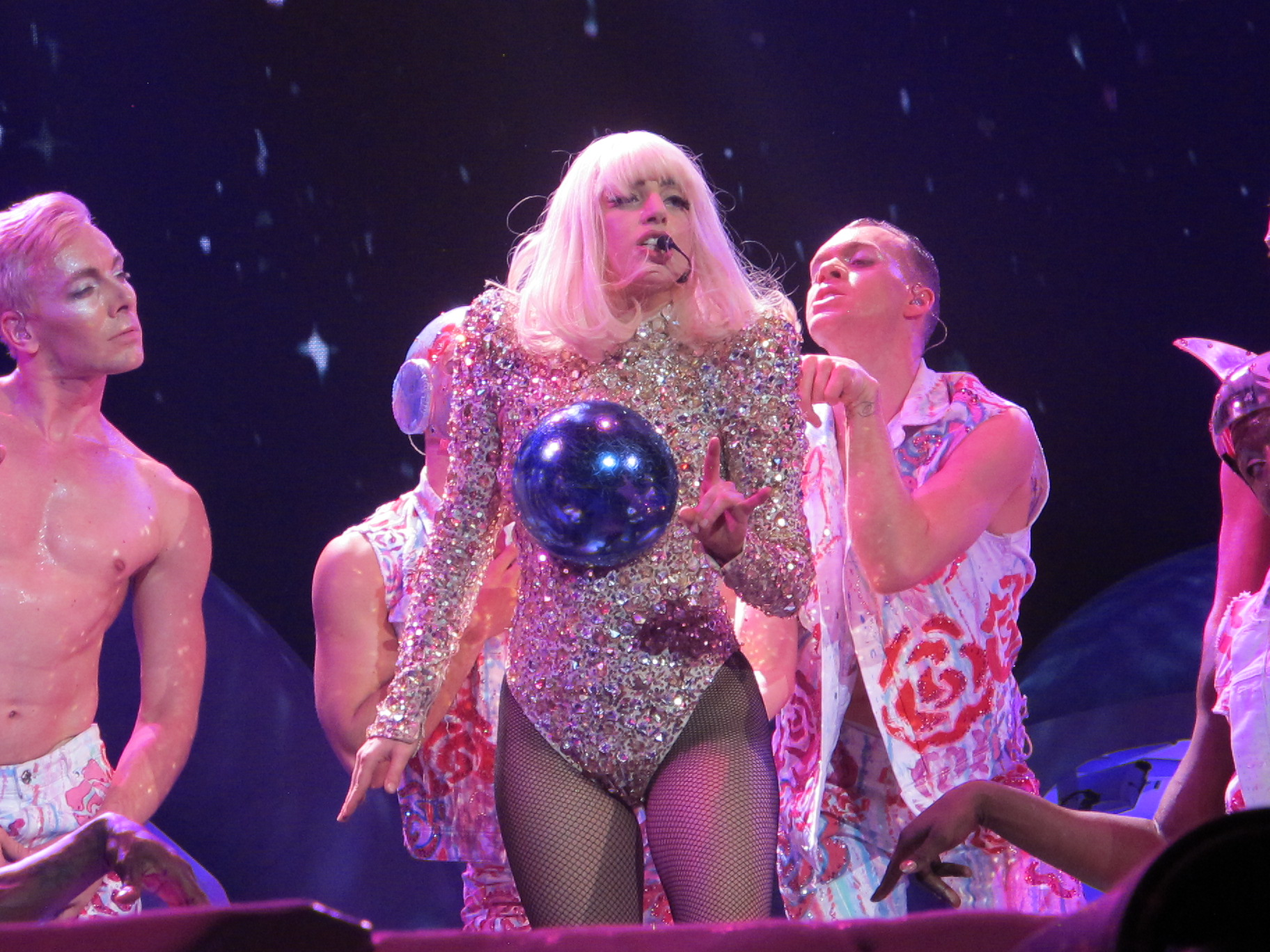
Gaga performing "G.U.Y." on ArtRave: The Artpop Ball tour

"G.U.Y." was included in the setlist of her Manhattan concert residency at Roseland Ballroom. Following the performance of "Applause", Gaga appeared in a white jumpsuit and green colored wig which she had introduced during the Artpop era. She stood in the middle of the Ballroom stage and sang the opening lyrics while purple neon lights flooded the stage. On April 2, her performance of the song was broadcast on Late Show with David Letterman along with her song "Dope". Amanda Holpuch from The Guardian recalled that the performance of "G.U.Y." received "as much love as [Gaga's] first big hit 'Just Dance'". April Spanos from The Village Voice rendered the performances of "Applause" and "G.U.Y." as the "power duo" of the night. She added that the latter was "particularly pleasant to hear live; the Zedd beat was made to be experienced in a club and its crunch was felt all over the dancefloor." Conversely, Hilary Hughes from USA Today felt that the simplest moments of the performances were the ones featuring toned down versions of her singles like "Born This Way" and "Poker Face", rather than the "extravagant" choreography during "Bad Romance" and "G.U.Y."

The song was also included in the set list of her ArtRave: The Artpop Ball tour, being the second track performed. The singer wore a bejeweled leotard which had the Jeff Koons blue gazing ball attached in the middle; the ball was previously used in the album cover art for Artpop. Gaga accessorized the dress with a pair of feathered wings while wearing a blond bob wig reminiscent of her looks from The Fame era. Following the performance of the album title song, "Artpop", Gaga loosened the wings and was joined by her dancers on the ramp to perform "G.U.Y." During the intermediate verses Gaga performed a choreographed routine reminiscent of the music video with a dancer. The performance ended with the singer and the dancers reaching the main stage and dancing energetically. It received positive review from Ross Raihala of St. Paul Pioneer Press who said that the song sounded "terrific" in its live rendition. Chuck Yarborough from The Plain Dealer noticed that Gaga sang with a backing track during the performance of "G.U.Y.", but concluded that "she and a gifted crew of dancers kept up a manic pace that matched the frenzy of the evening".

== Track listing and formats ==
Digital download – Remixes

1. "G.U.Y." (St. Lucia Remix) – 5:29
2. "G.U.Y." (Rami Samir Afuni Remix) – 4:28
3. "G.U.Y." (Wayne G Throwback Anthem) – 7:53
4. "G.U.Y." (Lovelife Remix) – 3:15
5. "G.U.Y." (KDrew Remix) – 4:45

== Credits and personnel ==
Credits adapted from the liner notes of Artpop.

=== Management ===
- Recorded at Record Plant Studios, Hollywood, California
- Mastered at Oasis Mastering Studios, Burbank, California
- Stefani Germanotta P/K/A Lady Gaga (BMI) Sony ATV Songs LLC/House of Gaga Publishing, LLC/GloJoe Music Inc. (BMI), Zedd Music Empire (ASCAP), All rights administered by Kobalt Songs Music Publishing.

=== Personnel ===
- Lady Gaga – songwriter, lead vocals, producer, piano, guitar, vocal arrangement
- Zedd – songwriter, producer, mixing
- Dave Russell – recording
- Benjamin Rice – recording assistant
- Sonja Durham – vocals during introduction
- Rick Pearl – additional programming
- Ryan Shanahan – assistant
- Jesse Taub – assistant
- Ivy Skoff – union contract administrator
- Gene Grimaldi – mastering

== Charts ==
Weekly chart performance for "G.U.Y."
| Charts (2013–2014) | Peak position |
|---|---|
| Australia (ARIA) | 88 |
| Belgium (Ultratip Bubbling Under Flanders) | 7 |
| Belgium (Ultratip Bubbling Under Wallonia) | 13 |
| Bulgaria Airplay (BAMP) | 5 |
| Canada CHR/Top 40 (Billboard) | 47 |
| Czech Republic Airplay (ČNS IFPI) | 45 |
| Finland Airplay (Radiosoittolista) | 38 |
| France (SNEP) | 92 |
| Greece Digital Songs (Billboard) | 8 |
| Italy (FIMI) | 94 |
| Lebanon (The Official Lebanese Top 20) | 16 |
| Slovakia Airplay (ČNS IFPI) | 73 |
| South Korea International (Gaon) | 54 |
| UK Singles (OCC) | 115 |
| US Billboard Hot 100 | 76 |
| US Dance Club Songs (Billboard) | 4 |
| US Pop Airplay (Billboard) | 29 |

== Certifications and sales ==
Certifications and sales for "G.U.Y."
| Region | Certification | Certified units/sales |
|---|---|---|
| Brazil (Pro-Música Brasil) | 2× Platinum | 120,000^{‡} |
^{‡} Sales+streaming figures based on certification alone.

== Release history ==
Release dates and formats for "G.U.Y."
| Region | Date | Format(s) | Version | Label(s) | Ref. |
|---|---|---|---|---|---|
| France | March 22, 2014 | Radio airplay | Original | Universal | |
| Italy | March 28, 2014 | Radio airplay | Original | Streamline | |
| United States | April 8, 2014 | Contemporary hit radio; rhythmic contemporary radio | Original | Streamline; Interscope | |
| Various | April 29, 2014 | Digital download; streaming | Remixes | Interscope | |
| United States | November 11, 2023 | 7" vinyl | Original | Interscope | |
