= Is That Alright? =

2018 song by Lady Gaga

Song by Lady Gaga

from the album A Star Is Born
- Studio: Five Star Bar (Los Angeles); Shrine Auditorium, EastWest, The Village West (Los Angeles)
- Length: 3:11
- Label: Interscope
- Songwriters: Lady Gaga; Mark Nilan Jr.; Nick Monson; Paul "DJWS" Blair; Lukas Nelson; Aaron Raitiere
- Producers: Lady Gaga; Mark Nilan Jr.; Nick Monson; Paul "DJWS" Blair

Audio video
- "Is That Alright?" on YouTube

"Is That Alright?" is a song from the 2018 film A Star Is Born and soundtrack of the same name, performed by American singer Lady Gaga. It was produced by Gaga, Mark Nilan Jr., Nick Monson, and Paul "DJ White Shadow" Blair; writing credits include all of them besides Lukas Nelson and Aaron Raitiere. The track is sung by Gaga's in-movie character, Ally, as a loving ode to Bradley Cooper's character, Jackson. It plays during the end credits of the original, theatrical cut of A Star Is Born, while appearing in the wedding scene in its extended, Encore edition.

The song received positive reviews, with critics praising Gaga's emotional vocals, drawing comparisons to Adele and Broadway ballads, and highlighting the track's vulnerability and dramatic structure. It charted within the top 30 in Hungary, Scotland, and Slovakia. Gaga performed "Is That Alright?" live for the first time at select dates of her Mayhem Ball tour (2025–2026).

== Background and composition ==
"Is That Alright?"
A 28-second sample of "Is That Alright?", showcasing Gaga's singing style switching from belting to soft whispers.

"Is That Alright?" first appeared as a snippet shared by Lady Gaga on September 25, 2018, in a teaser for her film, A Star Is Born, for which the song was written. The video gave a minute-long preview of the track, along with various clips from the movie. It later appeared as the twenty-fifth track of the standard version of the movie's soundtrack album, released on October 5, 2018. "Is That Alright?" is a power ballad with piano instrumentation. It is a "vulnerable" love song, composed in "the same vein" as the soundtrack's "Shallow" and 'I'll Never Love Again".

The song's writers and producers were Gaga, Mark Nilan Jr., Nick Monson, and Paul "DJ White Shadow" Blair, with Lukas Nelson and Aaron Raitiere providing additional writing. Talking about the writing process for the film, Blair said that "for every song that made it onto the album", they "wrote at least four others, in various iterations", which gave options when they had to decide which songs to keep for the story. He also added that "Is That Alright?" became his favorite song which ultimately ended up on the soundtrack. The track is performed in the key of G major with a moderate tempo of 105 beats per minute in common time. It follows a chord progression of G–G/B–Em–C during the verses and G–Em–G/B-G during the chorus, and the vocals span from E_{3} to E_{5}. Gaga's singing style shifts from belting to soft whispers in the song.

== Use in film and lyrical content ==
"Is That Alright?" played during the end credits in the original, theatrical cut of A Star Is Born. It is Ally's pledge to Jackson (the main characters of the movie, played by Gaga and Bradley Cooper), where she vows to love him until the end of her life. USA Today wrote that the track is "painting an evocative picture of their whirlwind romance as Gaga alternates between tender storyteller and throaty power belter", declaring "I want you at the end of my life... Wanna see your face when I fall with grace at the moment I die." Screen Rant thought the song "gives audiences another glimpse at what makes their relationship truly special", with Ally, "the up and coming singer ... put[ting] her heart into every verse." A Vulture article argued that by placing "Is That Alright?" at the very end of the story, it can be interpreted as "a tragic ode to future dreams that'll go unfulfilled." The same outlet pointed out the "lunatic level of adoration and tenderness" from Ally's character in the song, underscored by the "Nothing you say wouldn't interest me" line in the lyrics.

A deleted scene from A Star Is Born, involving Ally's performance of "Is That Alright?", got featured between the DVD/Blu-ray extras of the film in February 2019. After a one-week long limited release in cinemas the following March, an extended cut of the movie was released to home media in June 2019, titled A Star Is Born: Special Encore Edition. This version of the movie gives a longer scene of Jackson and Ally's wedding reception and reinstates "Is That Alright?" into the story. Ally sits down at the band piano, grabbing the microphone, and says to Jackson: "When we gave our vows at the altar, I just didn't get to say everything I wanted to say. So I wrote it down, and I brought it here. I hope it's okay if I love you forever, Jack." (Note: These words appeared on the standard version of the soundtrack for A Star Is Born in the dialogue track titled "Vows".) She then sings "Is That Alright?". Slate's Heather Schwedel said the track originally was "a bit of a mystery", but the Encore edition "fills in why this song existed in the first place" with the "sweet" extra scene.

== Critical reception ==
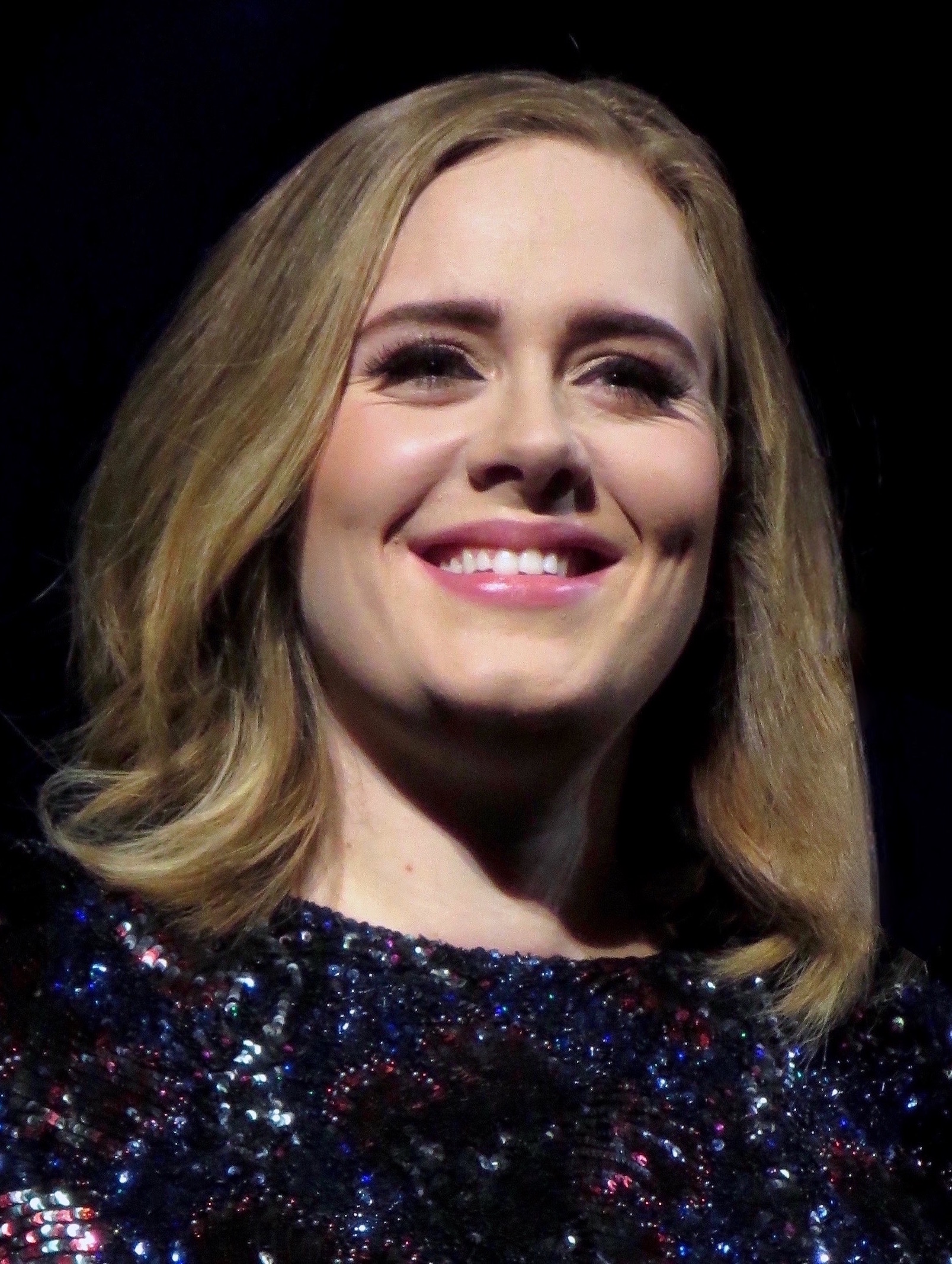
Some outlets found the song to be reminiscent of the style of Adele (pictured in 2016).

"Is That Alright?" received positive reviews from journalists, who complimented Gaga's vocals and found the track emotional. A column by Vulture regarded the song "more reminiscent of Adele than Lady Gaga", an opinion concurred by The Guardian, where it was analyzed as one of the tracks from the soundtrack which could have been "in the songbooks of Elton John or Adele for years". Wren Graves of Consequence called it a "big Broadway ballad", evoking the Wicked's "Defying Gravity" (2003) and Evita's "Don't Cry for Me Argentina" (1976). It reminded Bustle's Tatiana Tenreyro of Gaga's own ballads, "Speechless" (2009) and "Million Reasons" (2016), though she added, "this one has lyrics that feel even more vulnerable, showing how much Ally desires Jackson's love and sees him as The One." In his review of the soundtrack, Chris DeVille of Stereogum felt that the "blustery piano ballad 'Is That Alright?' and 'Always Remember Us This Way' [...] would work as Joanne bonus tracks, and they're at least as good as "Million Reasons", that album's one true hit."

According to Joey Morona from The Plain Dealer, "Is That Alright?" is a "moving" love song with Gaga's "signature emotion and power". He felt the song is on the same level as the album's "Shallow" and "I'll Never Love Again", envisioning a "three-song race" for an Academy Awards nomination in the Best Original Song category. (Note: "Shallow" ultimately ended up being the nominated song, and later the winner of the category at the 91st Academy Awards.) Vulture's Natalie Walker claimed it is the best track from the soundtrack, thinking "the vocal and energetic bipolarity of this song is what makes it so endlessly affecting". She further added: "High notes are impressive, midrange belting is powerful, light and airy falsetto moments are pretty; the tessitura in which the verses of 'Is That Alright' exist strips Gaga bare of any vocal pyrotechnics, and all we are left to focus on are the specifics of her yearning pleas for all-encompassing intimacy." Gaga's singing "at the bottom of her range" recalled Beyoncé's 2009 single, "Halo" for Walker. Hunter Harris, from the same website, similarly praised "Is That Alright?", calling it "arguably A Star Is Born's greatest song", and noted how director Bradley Cooper "made amends" by including the track in the actual movie in its later Encore version. Paris Close at iHeart believed "the number is every bit of warm and vulnerable and fearless as the singer-songwriter belts her heart out to her beloved."

Ben Beaumont-Thomas of The Guardian remarked the lyrics "on the page" are "almost ludicrous, but on record it grabs your ribcage". He further added that the song's "earnestness is [...] completely sold by Gaga", and suggested the song could become popular on wedding receptions. At The Ringer, Alyssa Bereznak appreciated "the structural conceit of this song: a stream-of-consciousness outpouring of tender sentiment, followed by a forceful chorus full of demands for eye contact and eternal matrimony, capped off with a sweet, searching question". Writing for The Daily Telegraph, Neil McCormick opined the song "may be a predictably constructed soapy piano ballad but in the plotline's context of a lovelorn woman grasping for joy in a doomed romance, it won't leave a dry eye in the house." For The Washington Post's Bethonie Butler, "Is That Alright?" is a "sweet but cheesy ballad." Adam White of The Independent deemed it one of the more forgettable tracks of the soundtrack, though he noted "Gaga belting her heart out against a piano melody as if her life depended on it".

== Chart performance ==
"Is That Alright?" is one of five tracks (Note: The other four being: "Shallow", "I'll Never Love Again", "Always Remember Us This Way", and "Maybe It's Time".) from the soundtrack which managed to enter the Billboard Hot 100, appearing on the chart at number 63, while also charting at number 85 on the Canadian Hot 100. In the United Kingdom, it peaked at number 23 on the UK Singles Downloads Chart and was certified Silver by the British Phonographic Industry (BPI) for selling over 200,000 track-equivalent units in the country. In Australia, the song debuted at number 97 on the ARIA Singles Chart, and improved one position the next week. It peaked at number 40 on the New Zealand Hot Singles chart. Additionally, the song reached number 19 on Billboard's Euro Digital Songs chart, 22 on the Hungarian Single Top 40 chart, 20 on the Scottish Singles Sales Chart, 12 on the Slovak Singles Digitál Top 100 chart, and 33 on the Spanish Physical/Digital chart. In 2021, "Is That Alright?" was awarded a gold certification from the Polish Society of the Phonographic Industry (ZPAV) for track-equivalent sales of 25,000 units in Poland.

== Live performances ==
Gaga performed "Is That Alright?" for the first time ever as part of the Mayhem Ball tour on November 18, 2025, during the second of four shows in Paris, France. She performed the song on piano, and dedicated it to her fans, their loved ones, and her fiancé, Michael Polansky. She later reprised the song at select dates of the tour.

== Credits and personnel ==
Credits adapted from the liner notes of the A Star Is Born soundtrack album.

=== Management ===
- Published by Sony/ATV Songs LLC / SG Songs LLC (BMI) / Happygowrucke / Creative Pulse Music/These Are Pulse Songs (BMI).
- All rights administered by These Are Pulse Songs, BIRB Music (ASCAP) / BMG Rights Management (US) LLC
- Warner Tamerlane Publishing Corp. / Super LCS Publishing / One Tooth Productions (BMI), Warner-Barham Music LLC (BMI)
- Extra administration by Songs of Universal (BMI) / Warner-Olive Music LLC (ASCAP) admin. by Universal Music Corp. (ASCAP)
- Recorded at Five Star Bar (Los Angeles). Additional recording at Shrine Auditorium, EastWest Studios, The Village West (Los Angeles).
- Mixed at Electric Lady Studios (New York City)
- Mastered at Sterling Sound Studios (New York City)

=== Personnel ===
- Lady Gaga – songwriter, producer, primary vocals
- Mark Nilan Jr. – songwriter, producer, piano
- Nick Monson – songwriter, producer
- Paul "DJWS" Blair – songwriter, producer
- Lukas Nelson – songwriter
- Aaron Raitiere – songwriter
- Benjamin Rice – recording
- Bo Bodnar – recording assistant
- Tom Elmhirst – mixing
- Brandon Bost – mixing engineer
- Randy Merrill – audio mastering

== Charts ==
Weekly chart performance for "Is That Alright?"
Chart (2018)	Peak position
Australia (ARIA)	96
Canada Hot 100 (Billboard)	85
Euro Digital Songs (Billboard)	19
Hungary (Single Top 40)	22
New Zealand Hot Singles (RMNZ)	40
Scottish Singles Sales (Official Charts)	20
Slovakia (Singles Digitál Top 100)	12
Spain Physical/Digital (PROMUSICAE)	33
UK Singles Downloads (Official Charts)	23
US Billboard Hot 100	63

== Certifications ==
Certifications for "Is That Alright?"
Region	Certification	Certified units/sales
Australia (ARIA)	Gold	35,000^{‡}
Brazil (Pro-Música Brasil)	Platinum	40,000^{‡}
New Zealand (RMNZ)	Gold	15,000^{‡}
Poland (ZPAV)	Gold	25,000^{‡}
United Kingdom (BPI)	Silver	200,000^{‡}
^{‡} Sales+streaming figures based on certification alone.
