= Nick Monson =

American record producer

- Born: Illinois
- Genres: Pop, R&B, Soundtracks
- Occupations: Producer, Songwriter
- Years active: 2013 - present

Nicholas Paul Monson is a producer, songwriter, and instrumentalist, based in Los Angeles, California.

== Career ==
Monson is known for his collaborations with Lady Gaga, beginning with Artpop, in which he co-produced 9 songs, including the lead single "Applause", which reached No.4 at US Mainstream Top 40 Chart.

Monson produced and co-wrote Selena Gomez's "Good For You" (featuring A$AP Rocky), which reached No. 1 at US Top 40 and Top 5 on the Billboard Hot 100 Charts. In 2017, Monson was nominated for a Golden Globe for Best Original Song, along with co-writers Nick Jonas and Justin Tranter for their contribution to the Ferdinand Soundtrack with "Home". In 2017 Monson also co-wrote the worldwide hit "Human" by Rag N Bone Man which received a BRIT Award for Best Song.

He continued his work as both a writer and producer in 2018, credited on seven of the album's tracks on Lady Gaga's A Star Is Born soundtrack, which debuted at No. 1 on the Billboard 200 charts. In 2019 Monson won a Grammy award for Best Compilation Soundtrack For Visual Media for his work on A Star Is Born.

Monson has written and produced for several artists, including Britney Spears, Nick Jonas, Rag'n'Bone Man, Anne-Marie, Little Mix, Dylan Mulvaney, and Julia Michaels.

== Select production discography ==
Year	Title	Artist	Album	Role
2024	"Guilty Pleasure"	JoJo Siwa	Single	Producer, Co-writer
	"Asking"	Trinity Lake	Single	Co-writer
	"Days of Girlhood"	Dylan Mulvaney	Single	Producer, Co-Writer
2023	"Mad Love" 狂愛	Will Pan	Single	Producer, Writer
2023	"Poison"	Zevia	Single	Producer, Writer
2023	"i'm trying"	Alexander Stewart	Single	Writer
2023	"Born Again"	Bebe Rexha	Bebe	Co-producer, writer
2022	"In Another Life"	The Sunshine State	In Another Life EP	Producer, writer
2022	"Dating A Drug Dealer"	The Sunshine State	In Another Life EP	Producer, writer
2022	"Bob"	The Sunshine State	In Another Life EP	Producer, writer
2022	"Sweet Revenge"	The Sunshine State	In Another Life EP	Producer, writer
2022	"Pushing 30"	The Sunshine State	In Another Life EP	Producer, writer
2022	"Venting to Strangers"	Emeline	Single	Producer, writer
2021	"Favorite Person"	The Sunshine State	Single	Producer, writer
2021	"Bestie"	A Boogie, Capella Grey	Single	Writer
2021	"that way" ft. Jeremy Zucker	Tate McRae, Jeremy Zucker	single	Producer, writer
2021	"Stuck In The Moment"	Mat Kearney	January Flower	Writer
2021	"Things Changed"	The Sunshine State	single	Producer, writer
2020	"Cliff Drive"	The Sunshine State	single	Producer, writer
2020	"lovin kind"	Isabela Merced	the better half of me	Producer, writer
2020	"that way"	Tate McRae	All The Things I Never Said	Producer, writer
2019	"Everything It Wasn't"	Skyler Stonestreet	single	Producer, writer
2019	"I Do It All For You"	Walk Off The Earth	HERE WE GO!	Writer
2018	"Joanne (Piano Version)	Lady Gaga	single	Producer
2018	"Jump"	Julia Michaels	single	Producer
2018	"Bad Girlfriend"	Anne-Marie	Speak Your Mind	Producer
2018	"Why Did You Do That?"	Lady Gaga	A Star Is Born soundtrack	Producer, writer
2018	"Before I Cry"	Lady Gaga	A Star Is Born soundtrack	Producer, writer
2018	"Hair Body Face"	Lady Gaga	A Star Is Born soundtrack	Producer, writer
2018	"Is That Alright?"	Lady Gaga	A Star Is Born soundtrack	Producer, writer
2018	"Heal Me"	Lady Gaga	A Star Is Born soundtrack	Producer, writer
2018	"Look What I Found"	Lady Gaga	A Star Is Born soundtrack	Producer, writer
2018	"I Don't Know What Love Is"	Lady Gaga	A Star Is Born soundtrack	string arrangement, additional production
2018	"I'll Stay"	Isabela Merced	Instant Family	Producer, writer
2018	"It Kinda Hurts"	Skyler Stonestreet	single	Producer, writer
2018	"Bass Bumps"	Jess Kent	single	Producer, writer
2018	"Bankrupt"	Skyler Stonestreet	single	Producer, writer
2017	"Human"	Rag'n'Bone Man	Human	Producer, writer
2017	"The Cure"	Lady Gaga	single	Co-writer, Producer
2017	"Home"	Nick Jonas	Ferdinand Soundtrack	Producer
2017	"No Better Feelin'"	CL	My Little Pony: The Movie	Producer, writer
2016	"Sick With Love"	The Veronicas		Co-writer, Producer
2016	"Over"	Paul McDonald	single	Co-writer, Producer
2016	"Invitation"	Britney Spears	Glory	Co-writer, Producer
2016	"Just Like Me"	Britney Spears	Glory	Co-writer, Producer
2016	"Get Closer"	XYLO	single	Co-writer, Producer
2015	"Psychotic"	Chris Miles	single	Co-writer, Producer
2015	"Prosecco"	Timeflies	Just For Fun	Co-writer, Producer
2015	"Good For You" (feat. A$AP Rocky) (BMI Pop Award Winner)	Selena Gomez	Revival	Co-writer, Producer
2015	"Nobody"	Selena Gomez	Revival	Co-writer, Producer
2015	"OMG"	Little Mix	Get Weird	Co-writer, Producer
2014	"Numb" (feat Angel Haze)	Nick Jonas	Nick Jonas	Co-writer, Producer
2014	"Closer" (feat Mike Posner)	Nick Jonas	Nick Jonas	Co-writer, Producer
2013	"Applause" (BMI Pop Award Winner)	Lady Gaga	Artpop	Co-writer, Co-producer
2013	"Venus"	Lady Gaga	Artpop	Co-writer, Co-producer
2013	"Manicure"	Lady Gaga	Artpop	Co-writer, Co-producer
2013	"Jewels N Drugs" (feat T.I., Twista, Too $hort)	Lady Gaga	Artpop	Co-writer, Co-producer
2013	"Swine"	Lady Gaga	Artpop	Co-writer, Co-producer
2013	"Artpop"	Lady Gaga	Artpop	Co-writer, Co-producer
2013	"Dope"	Lady Gaga	Artpop	Co-writer
2013	"Sexxx Dreams"	Lady Gaga	Artpop	Co-producer
2013	"Brooklyn Nights"	Lady Gaga	unreleased	Co-writer, Co-producer
2013	"Applause" (DJ White Shadow Trap Remix)	Lady Gaga	single	Co-producer
2013	"Don't Wake Me Up" (DJ White Shadow Trap Remix)	Chris Brown	single	Co-producer
