= Why Did You Do That? =

Song by Lady Gaga

Song by Lady Gaga

from the album A Star Is Born
- Released: October 5, 2018
- Studio: Woodrow Wilson Studios (Hollywood, CA); The Village West (Los Angeles, CA); Shangri-La Studios (Malibu, CA)
- Venue: Saturday Night Live; NBC Studios
- Genre: Dance-pop
- Length: 3:04
- Label: Interscope
- Songwriters: Lady Gaga; Diane Warren; Mark Nilan Jr.; Nick Monson; Paul "DJWS" Blair
- Producers: Lady Gaga; Mark Nilan Jr.; Nick Monson; Paul "DJWS" Blair

Audio video
- "Why Did You Do That?" on YouTube

"Why Did You Do That?" is a song recorded by American singer Lady Gaga for the 2018 film A Star Is Born and released on the soundtrack of the same name. It was written by Gaga with Diane Warren, Mark Nilan Jr., Nick Monson and Paul "DJWS" Blair, and produced by all but Warren. The song appears in the film during a sequence when Gaga's character, Ally, performs on Saturday Night Live, watched by her husband Jackson (played by co-star Bradley Cooper). Later Jackson berates Ally for selling out with the song's trite lyrics, but she defends it. "Why Did You Do That?" was written to evoke both a retro and a modern feel, and was recorded while Gaga was on her Joanne World Tour.

The song is interspersed with the sound of a xylophone and a repetitive chorus and post-chorus. After its release, the track received a great deal of attention for its lyrics, which some critics and fans felt were a critique of pop music. The songwriters defended the track, saying it was specifically written to emphasize that Ally's career was on the rise as Jackson's was declining.

== Recording and composition ==
"Why Did You Do That?" was written by Gaga with Diane Warren, Mark Nilan Jr., Nick Monson and Paul "DJWS" Blair; all but Warren produced it. The singer had first collaborated with Warren on the 2015 sexual assault-themed song, "Til It Happens to You". Wanting to create a "cool and fun Gaga song", Warren wrote the lyrics of "Why Did You Do That?" against a backing track. Gaga wanted a "retro/modern feel" to the song and wanted Warren to get out of her comfort zone of writing alone. Monson had worked with Gaga on her third studio album, Artpop (2013), and was called in to write songs for A Star Is Born in early March 2017. Around two and a half years before, Paul "DJWS" Blair asked Mark Nilan Jr. to come to The Village West studio in Los Angeles and do a songwriting session with Gaga and Warren, resulting in the initial version of "Why Did You Do That?".

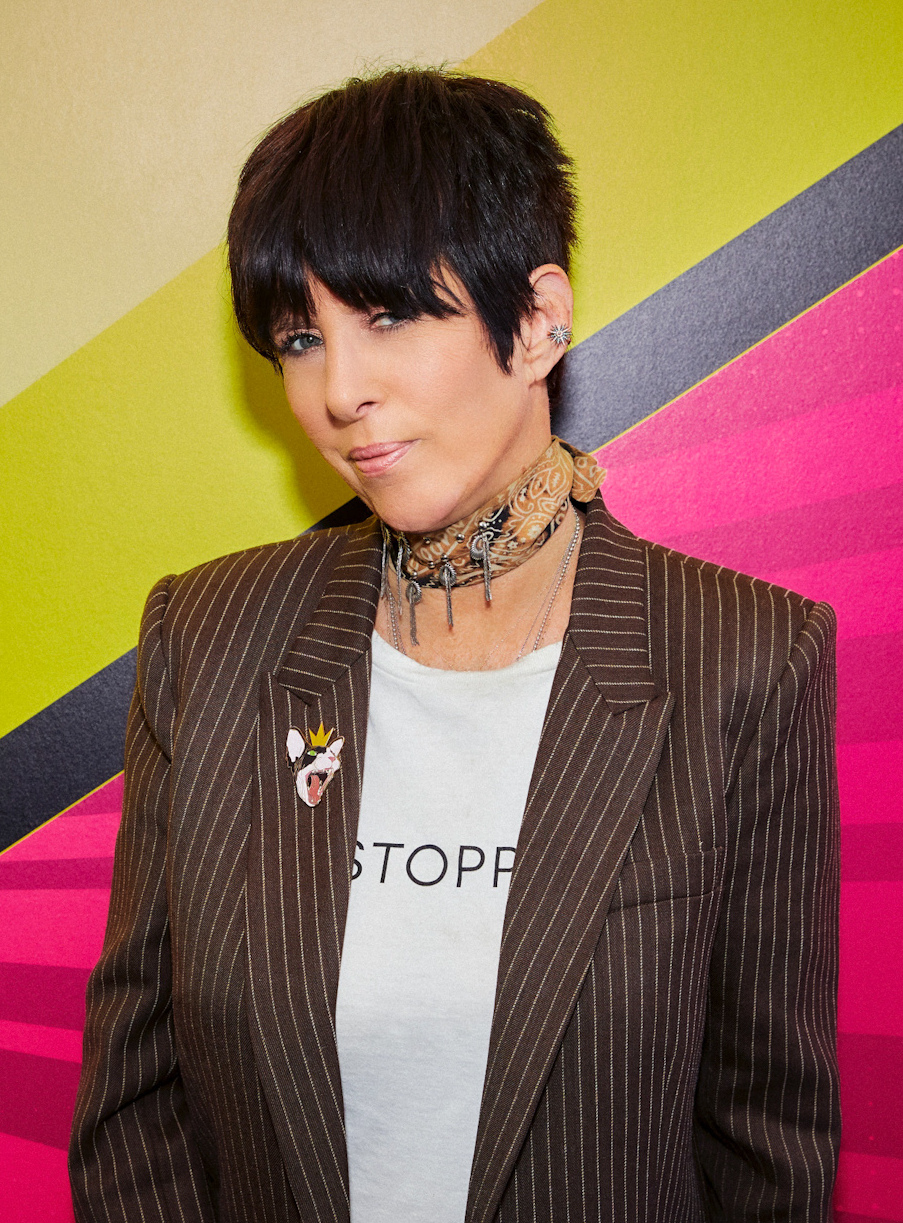
Diane Warren co-wrote the song and defended its lyrics, noting that it was not meant to be a "bad pop song", but rather a fun, light-hearted track.

Cooper and Gaga began working with producers on the songs for A Star Is Born in a recording studio in Los Angeles. Once Gaga embarked on her Joanne World Tour (2017–2018), they created a recording studio on the tour bus. Every night after her show Gaga would return to the studio bus and record the tracks. Further recording was carried out at Woodrow Wilson in Hollywood, California, and Shangri-La Studios in Malibu, California. "Why Did You Do That?" was mixed by Tom Elmhirst at Electric Lady Studios in New York and was mastered by Randy Merrill at Sterling Sound Studios. The song opens with Ally singing the lines, "Why do you look so good in those jeans? / Why'd you come around me with an ass like that?" Warren had thought about the line and Gaga agreed to include it as the opening lyric. The composition is interspersed with xylophone music and the word "damn" in the mix. The chorus is repetitive with Gaga singing the words, "Why did you do that, do that, do that, do that, do that to me?" against a house beat.

Warren clarified that the intention was not to write a "bad" pop song, but something that was fun and less serious, showing Ally's change into a pop artist. She added: "I love that [Ally] defended her music. It doesn't have to be what he thinks music should be – music can be everything. It can be a serious song, it can be a pop song, it can be a song about an ass." Blair also defended the lyrics in an interview with The Washington Post, saying that it was written to specifically portray Ally's career "taking off", and hence it had to be "more bubbly and mainstream". He felt whatever the song Jackson would have resented it since he was upset at Ally's success and his failing career. Gaga on the other hand was vague about whether "Why Did You Do That?" is a bad song saying: "When we see her on Saturday Night Live and she’s singing a song about why do you look so good in those jeans, it’s almost the antithesis of where we started," Gaga said. "That is relatively shallow."

== Use in film ==
In A Star Is Born, "Why Did You Do That?" is performed by Lady Gaga's character Ally on an Alec Baldwin-hosted episode of Saturday Night Live. The performance represents Ally's transformation from a simple singer-songwriter into a "full-fledged radio pop star". Cooper's character, Ally's husband rock musician Jackson Maine, watches her perform it. This drives him to start drinking again. According to Refinery29, Jackson's disbelief and disappointment stems from his feeling that Ally is "selling out". Later, when Ally receives a Grammy Award nomination, a drunken Jackson berates her for "letting go of the person he thought she was happiest being". Ally defends the song and they quarrel.

For the dance sequence during the song, Gaga enlisted her long-time choreographer Richy Jackson, who choreographed all the performances in the film. The singer wanted the choreography to be "jerky". Jackson described the choreography he created for the song as having "pop/R&B style with a 90s feel to it". Since Ally's style and movements are not supposed to be like Gaga's, Jackson created an individual aesthetic for Ally as she performs "Why Did You Do That?" and the other uptempo songs like "Heal Me" and "Hair Body Face".

== Critical response and analysis ==
After the soundtrack was released, "Why Did You Do That?" divided critics. Many reviewers assumed it was purposefully written with trite lyrics, to underscore Jackson's point of view about pop music compared to his country-rock songs. Critics found Jackson's dismissal of "pop music" to be caused by the character's short-sightedness and inability to go beyond his own rock music. Others believed that the "bad" song led the character reverting to his "rampant alcoholism". Chris DeVille of Stereogum similarly questioned whether the song was meant to be "bad", representing Ally's turn away from authentic expression in pursuit of cheap fame, or whether it was instead a catchy pop song designed to offend Jackson's rockist sensibilities. He described it as a "paint-by-numbers pop tune" built around elements such as xylophone and violin parts, bass drops, and an incessant chorus melody.

Brittany Spanos of Rolling Stone felt that the first time Gaga performs the song in the film it "is meant to be jarring on many levels" since it is the first time the audience sees Ally as a pop star. Spanos believes "Why Did You Do That?" presents "an argument against pop, which inherently feels like an argument against Lady Gaga herself, one of the biggest advocates for the delectably catchy dance-pop Ally embodies". However, she does find the song "intoxicating" and "actually pretty great", comparing it to Gaga's early work from The Fame (2008) era, "a vampy flirt with a penchant for a hook you won't forget for years". Alejandra Salazar of Refinery29 described the track as a "campy, over-the-top pop track with ridiculous lyrics about texting and praying, and also about butts". Salazar wondered whether the song was purposely "engineered to be not-so-good", to portray rock music as a more authentic genre in the film.

Writing for The Daily Dot, Brenden Gallagher noted that "Why Did You Do That?" was not submitted by Warner Bros. for the Academy Award for Best Original Song, although it was popular among fans for its lyrics. Gallagher listed a number of Internet memes based on the song. Alyssa Bereznak of The Ringer wrote that, although the film's narrative implies the song is meant to be disliked, it "carries a certain Eiffel 65–esque je ne sais quoi", adding: "Leave it to Gaga to make an intentionally bad song good." Hazel Cillis of Jezebel contends that although "Shallow" and "I'll Never Love Again" "might be the Oscar bait" of Cooper's movie, "Why Did You Do That" is a "mindless pop song that embodies all that Ally has become in the movie". Esquire's Matt Miller viewed it as a "perfect shitty pop hit", with laughable lyrics and a beat that "sounds like something a teenager would make on GarageBand", but nevertheless argued that it works in the context of the movie to signal that Ally is reshaped into a manufactured pop commodity by the music industry.

Nate Jones of Vulture characterized "Why Did You Do That?" as "the song about butts", noting how the song's opening line had become a central point of discussion of the film's portrayal of pop music against rock. Jones felt the general perception about the track "often boils down to how you feel about [it] – is it terrible, is it a bop, or is it a terrible song that's also a bop?" He found a number of "ear-candy" elements in the composition which grabbed the audience's attention, especially after the line about buttocks. Writing for The New York Times, Kyle Buchanan confessed to having the lyrics stuck in his head. He added that the track can sound shocking initially since "it forgoes the timelessness of 'Shallow' and its ilk in favor of what feels like pop disposability", but noted its rising popularity on social media. Dianne Warren noted the track has its "revenge, because it sticks in your brain. And then you end up saying, 'Why did you do that, do that, do that'."

== Credits and personnel ==
Credits adapted from the liner notes of A Star Is Born.

=== Management ===
- Recorded at Saturday Night Live set in NBC Studios, Woodrow Wilson Studios (Hollywood, California), The Village West (Los Angeles, California) and Shangri-La Studios (Malibu, California)
- Mixed at Electric Lady Studios (New York City)
- Mastered at Sterling Sound Studios (New York City)

=== Personnel ===
- Lady Gaga – primary vocals, songwriter, record producer
- Diane Warren – songwriter
- Mark Nilan Jr. – songwriter, producer, keyboards, programming
- Nick Monson – songwriter, producer, keyboards, programming
- Paul "DJWS" Blair – songwriter, producer
- Benjamin Rice – recording
- Alex Williams – recording assistant
- Rob Bisel – recording assistant
- Tom Elmhirst – mixing
- Brandon Bost – mixing engineer
- Randy Merrill – audio mastering
- Tim Stewart – guitar

== Charts ==
Weekly chart performance for "Why Did You Do That?"
Chart (2018)	Peak position
Slovakia Singles Digital (ČNS IFPI)	17

== Certifications and sales ==
Certifications and sales for "Why Did You Do That?"
Region	Certification	Certified units/sales
Brazil (Pro-Música Brasil)	Gold	20,000^{‡}
^{‡} Sales+streaming figures based on certification alone.
