= A Star Is Born (2018 soundtrack) =

2018 soundtrack album by Lady Gaga and Bradley Cooper

Soundtrack album by Lady Gaga and Bradley Cooper
- Released: October 5, 2018
- Recorded: 2017–2018
- Studios: Woodrow Wilson (Hollywood); EastWest, The Village West (Los Angeles); Shangri-La (Malibu); Electric Lady (New York City)
- Genres: Pop; pop rock; blues rock
- Length: 70:01 (standard version); 63:37 (version without dialogue)
- Label: Interscope
- Producers: Lady Gaga; Bradley Cooper; Paul "DJWS" Blair; Dave Cobb; Nick Monson; Lukas Nelson; Brian Newman; Mark Nilan Jr.; Benjamin Rice

Lady Gaga chronology
Joanne (2016)	A Star Is Born (2018)	Chromatica (2020)

Singles from A Star Is Born
- 1. "Shallow" Released: September 27, 2018; 2. "Always Remember Us This Way" Released: January 4, 2019; 3. "I'll Never Love Again" Released: May 27, 2019

A Star Is Born is the soundtrack album to the 2018 musical film of the same name, performed by its stars Lady Gaga and Bradley Cooper. It was released on October 5, 2018, by Interscope Records. Developed alongside the film's production, the soundtrack was conceived as a narrative-driven work, with songs written to reflect the characters' emotional arcs and function within the story. Cooper teamed up with Gaga's recurring collaborator DJ White Shadow and a range of musicians and songwriters, including Lukas Nelson, Jason Isbell, Mark Ronson, Diane Warren, and Andrew Wyatt. Much of the material was written during filming and evolved in tandem with the screenplay, as the production team shaped distinct musical identities for Cooper's Jackson Maine and Gaga's Ally.

Musically, the soundtrack is primarily a pop, pop rock and blues rock album, while also incorporating elements of country, folk rock, electropop, and dance-pop. Much of the music was created through a hybrid process that combined live vocals with pre-recorded instrumentation, helping recreate the atmosphere of the film. Its lyrics address love, change, personal struggle, and emotional vulnerability, while the sequencing follows the narrative progression from Jackson's rootsier material to Ally's more polished pop songs. The soundtrack was preceded by the lead single "Shallow", a major international hit, while "Always Remember Us This Way" and "I'll Never Love Again" were later released as singles in select countries.

The soundtrack received positive reviews from critics, who particularly praised Gaga's ballads, the chemistry between the two leads, and the way the music supports the film's narrative, though some felt the album was less effective outside the context of the film. It was also a major commercial success, topping charts in more than 20 countries and selling over six million copies worldwide. Among numerous accolades, "Shallow" won the Academy Award, Golden Globe Award, Critics' Choice Award, and two Grammy Awards, while the soundtrack won the Grammy Award for Best Compilation Soundtrack for Visual Media and the BAFTA Award for Best Film Music.

== Background and development ==
In March 2015, Warner Bros. announced that Bradley Cooper was in talks to make his directorial debut with A Star Is Born, the fourth iteration of the 1937 film of the same name. Music supervisors Julia Michels and Julianne Jordan had sought to work on the project since an earlier incarnation involving Clint Eastwood and Beyoncé, and eventually joined Cooper's version. American singer Lady Gaga was officially attached to the film in August 2016, with the studio green-lighting the project to begin production in early 2017. Cooper decided to cast Gaga after seeing her perform Édith Piaf's "La Vie en rose" (1947) at a charity event, which he said "blew [him] away" and led him to envision her as Ally. Gaga had performed the song for years before the film, and a rendition was later also recorded for the film and its soundtrack. In A Star Is Born, Cooper plays Jackson Maine, an established country singer who discovers and falls in love with Ally, a struggling singer-songwriter, portrayed by Gaga in her first lead feature-film role. Her rise to fame unfolds alongside his personal and professional decline, with Ally's success increasingly eclipsing Jackson’s fading career.

Cooper spent two-and-a-half years prepping for the film and determining what kind of musician his character would be. Gaga "helped inform Cooper's performance as a musician", advising him, "Work, and then you'll figure [it] out". As part of the preparations, Cooper set up a six-month "boot camp" at his Los Angeles home, where he learned guitar and piano and trained his voice to sing like a seasoned professional. He worked with vocal coach Roger Love and other musicians. Cooper said that, by the end of the process, Jackson "started developing into his own sort of creation"; if he had had another year of preparation, the character's music would have been "complete rock", but instead became "some sort of hybrid".

== Writing and recording ==
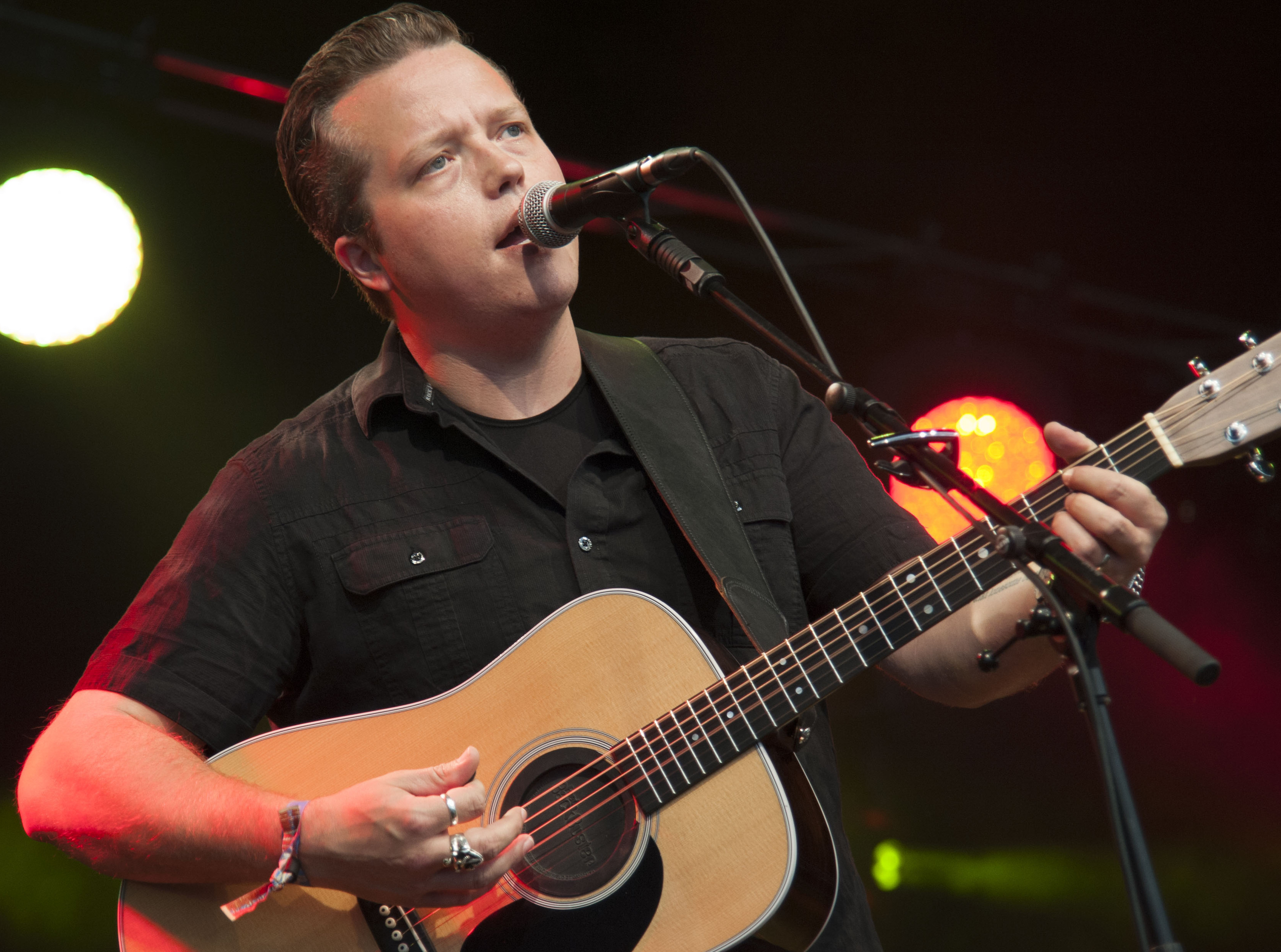
Jason Isbell wrote "Maybe It's Time" for Jackson Maine, which Bradley Cooper described as "the sword" from which much of the character's music emerged.

Cooper described the soundtrack "an evolution, like the story." Gaga and Cooper were writing songs for the soundtrack during filming, with each track going through numerous iterations. Cooper added that "the music really became a character in the movie. There is no lyric that's ever in any point of the movie that doesn't have exactly to do with where one of them is or hopes to be or regrets being. That was our launching pad and then it was just about discovering what songs fit in the right places." Michels recalled hearing Gaga perform songs for the team at her kitchen table and described the early collaboration between Gaga and Cooper as "poignant, soulful and special". She and Jordan subsequently followed the songwriting process, observing how Gaga wrote and selected collaborators and how Cooper developed his own material; Michels said the songs and story continually informed one another. Changes to the film's script also influenced the music; for example, "Shallow" was initially conceived as a solo song by Ally for the end credits, when the story ended with Jackson dying by drowning—an idea that informed the song's imagery—before it was reworked into a central love song between the film's protagonists.

Jason Isbell wrote "Maybe It's Time" to help define Cooper's character, Jackson. Initially reluctant to participate, he agreed after reading the screenplay, which he described as "honest and human". He sent the song to Cooper via Dave Cobb, a Nashville-based producer he had been working with, who later played it for Gaga and Cooper during a writing session in Los Angeles, where it impressed them and helped set the tone for the soundtrack. The song became Jackson's signature song, and Cooper later called it "the staple, the sword with which a lot of the music spawned from [him]" for the rest of the album. Cooper approached Lukas Nelson after seeing him perform at Desert Trip in October 2016 and asked him to work on the film as a music consultant. Nelson said he began "writing songs for the movie, just for the heck of it, and sending them over to the producer, and they started liking them. Then Lady Gaga came by and I met her and we clicked. We became good friends, and we started writing together." Gaga, in turn, provided backing vocals on two tracks on Nelson's self-titled album released in 2017. Nelson and his band, Lukas Nelson & Promise of the Real, appear in the film as Cooper's backing band.

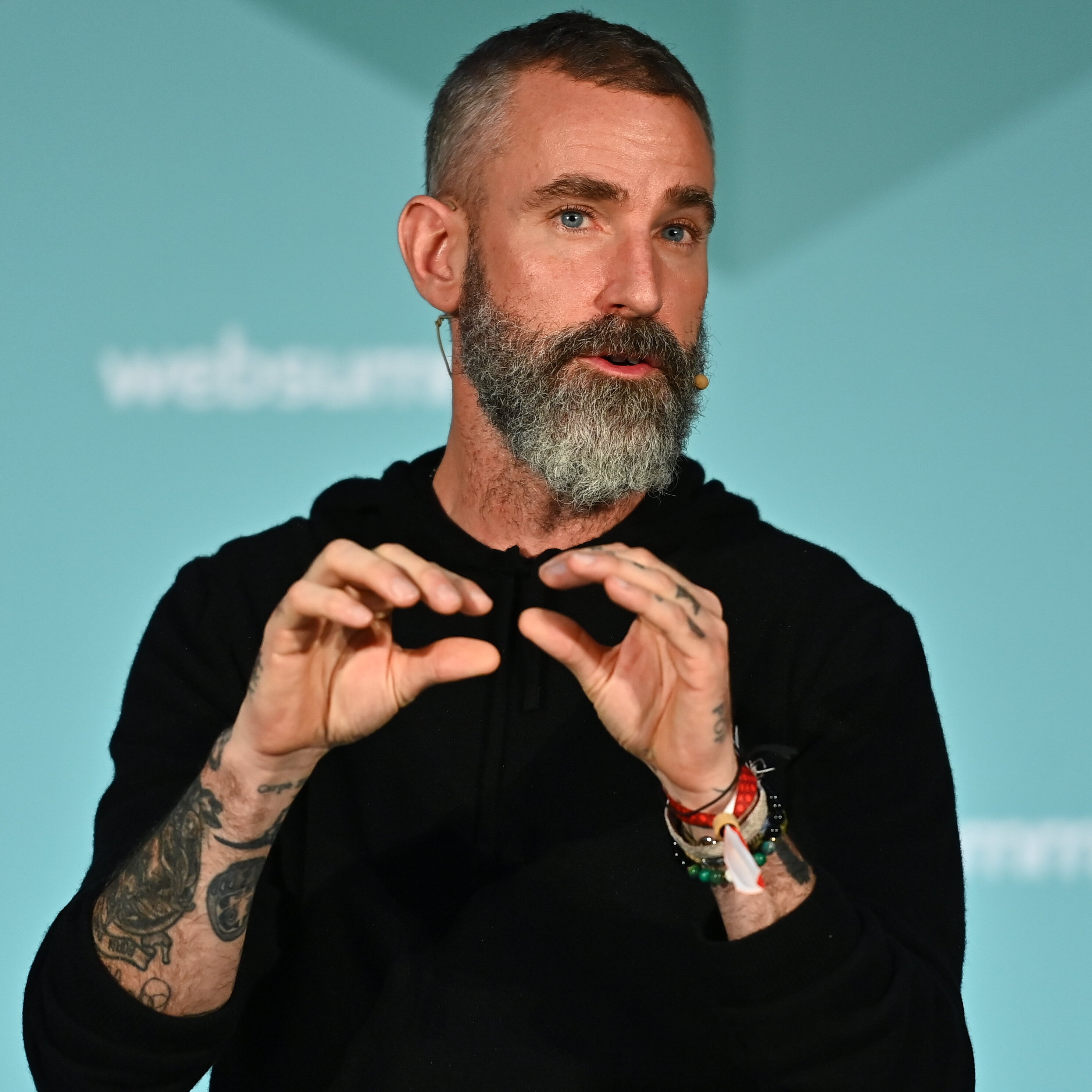
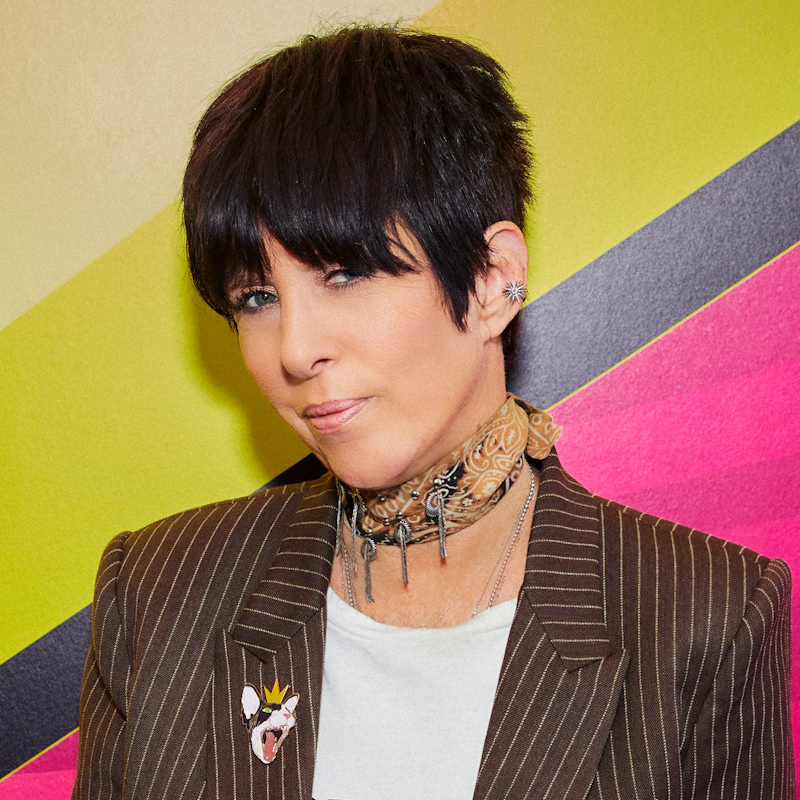
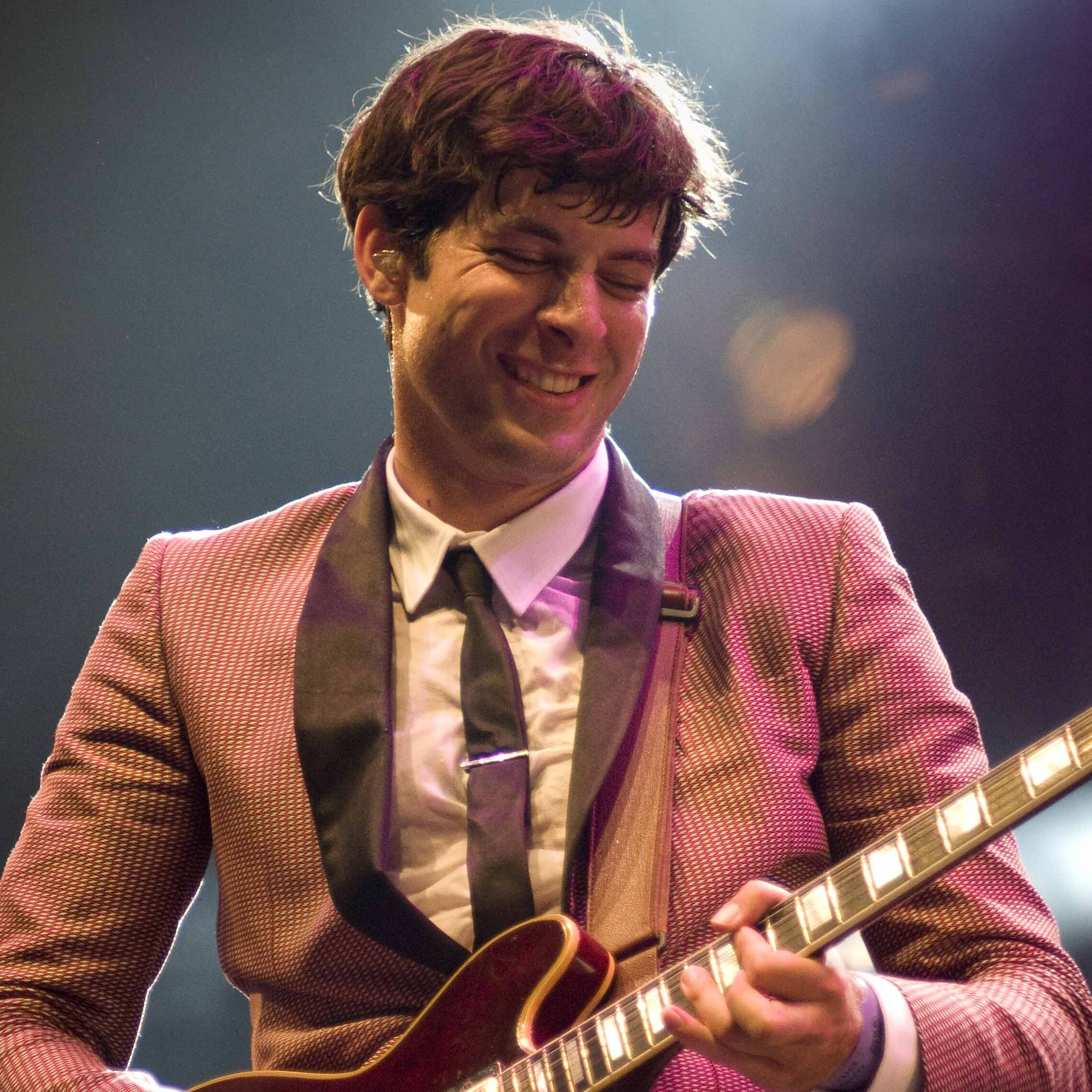
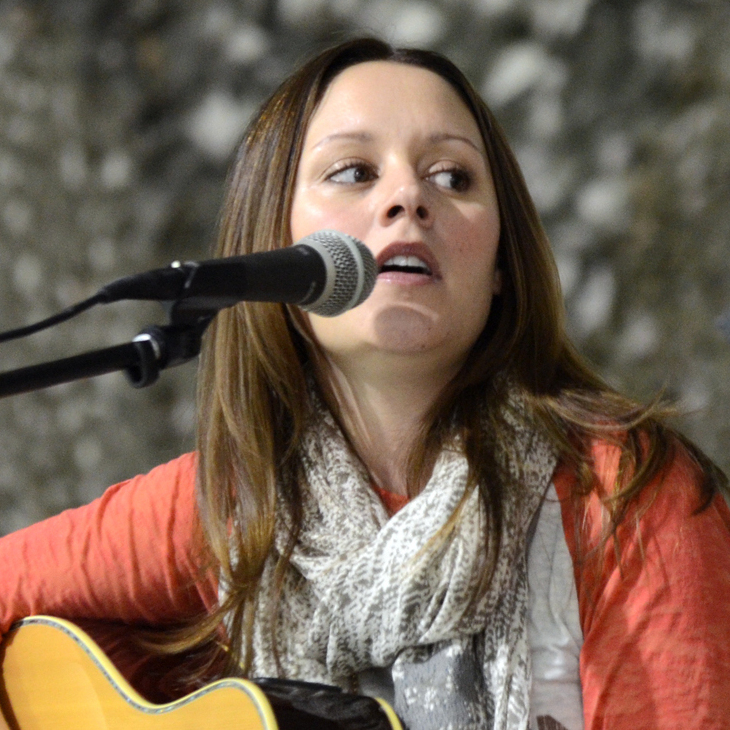
The soundtrack saw Lady Gaga reunite with songwriters she had previously worked with, including DJ White Shadow, Diane Warren, Hillary Lindsey, and Mark Ronson (clockwise, from top left).

Gaga reunited with producer Mark Ronson and songwriter Hillary Lindsey, who had both contributed to her previous studio album Joanne (2016). According to Ronson, his previous collaboration with Gaga on Joanne helped establish the creative intimacy behind "Shallow", which she wrote in character as Ally while also drawing on her own emotions and personal experiences. Gaga worked with recurring collaborator Paul "DJ White Shadow" Blair (Note: Blair had worked with Gaga on her studio albums Born This Way (2011) and Artpop (2013).) on the soundtrack's more pop-oriented numbers performed by her character Ally, as well as producers such as Nick Monson and Mark Nilan. Monson recalled that Gaga was deeply immersed in her role while writing and recording, often discarding vocal takes if she felt they did not align with how Ally would perform them, and described the sessions as highly improvisational, requiring collaborators to quickly adapt to her ideas. Blair described the songwriting process as a "moving target", with multiple songs and iterations created for each moment in the film, and said that Ally's material was written separately "in a bubble" to preserve the character's perspective. Diane Warren—previously a collaborator on "Til It Happens to You" (2015)—contributed songwriting on "Why Did You Do That?", which she said was written as a "cool and fun" pop song, with a "bit of a retro/modern feel" outside her usual style.

The songwriting process often continued directly into recording; for example, "Always Remember Us This Way" was recorded immediately after being written, with its songwriters also providing backing vocals during the session. During Gaga's Joanne World Tour (2017–2018), parts of the soundtrack were written and recorded on a mobile studio set up on her tour bus, where she and her collaborators would continue working on songs after her shows. As the album neared completion, last-minute changes were still being made in the studio; Monson recalled that string arrangements for songs such as "I Don't Know What Love Is" were expanded shortly before recording, and that an additional arrangement for "Before I Cry" was created and recorded within hours during the same session. For the film's closing performance of "I'll Never Love Again", multiple versions of the song were prepared in different tempos and keys so that the delivery could be adjusted during filming. The scene was recorded shortly after Gaga learned of the death of her close friend Sonja Durham, which informed the emotional intensity of the live vocal.

Much of the film's music was created through a hybrid production process shaped by Gaga's insistence on avoiding lip-syncing. Vocals were recorded live on set, while instrumental tracks were typically recorded in advance and played back during filming to ensure continuity between takes. To further enhance realism, the production team captured the acoustic characteristics of each venue so the performances would match their onscreen environments. Concert scenes were often filmed in front of large groups of extras, including invited fans, who generally could not hear the backing music during takes because it was played through earpieces to prevent unreleased material from leaking; their reactions were recorded separately and incorporated into the final mix. According to engineer Benjamin Rice, the recordings were designed to sound live in the studio—raw, natural, and gritty—while each song was shaped around the story and the contrasting musical identities of Jackson and Ally. For example, Cooper envisioned "Out of Time" as a gradually building song meant to draw Ally toward the stage, mirroring the scene in which she is persuaded to join Jackson in concert. For the soundtrack album, Gaga and Rice reworked the film recordings into album mixes and incorporated dialogue excerpts to retain narrative context.

== Composition ==
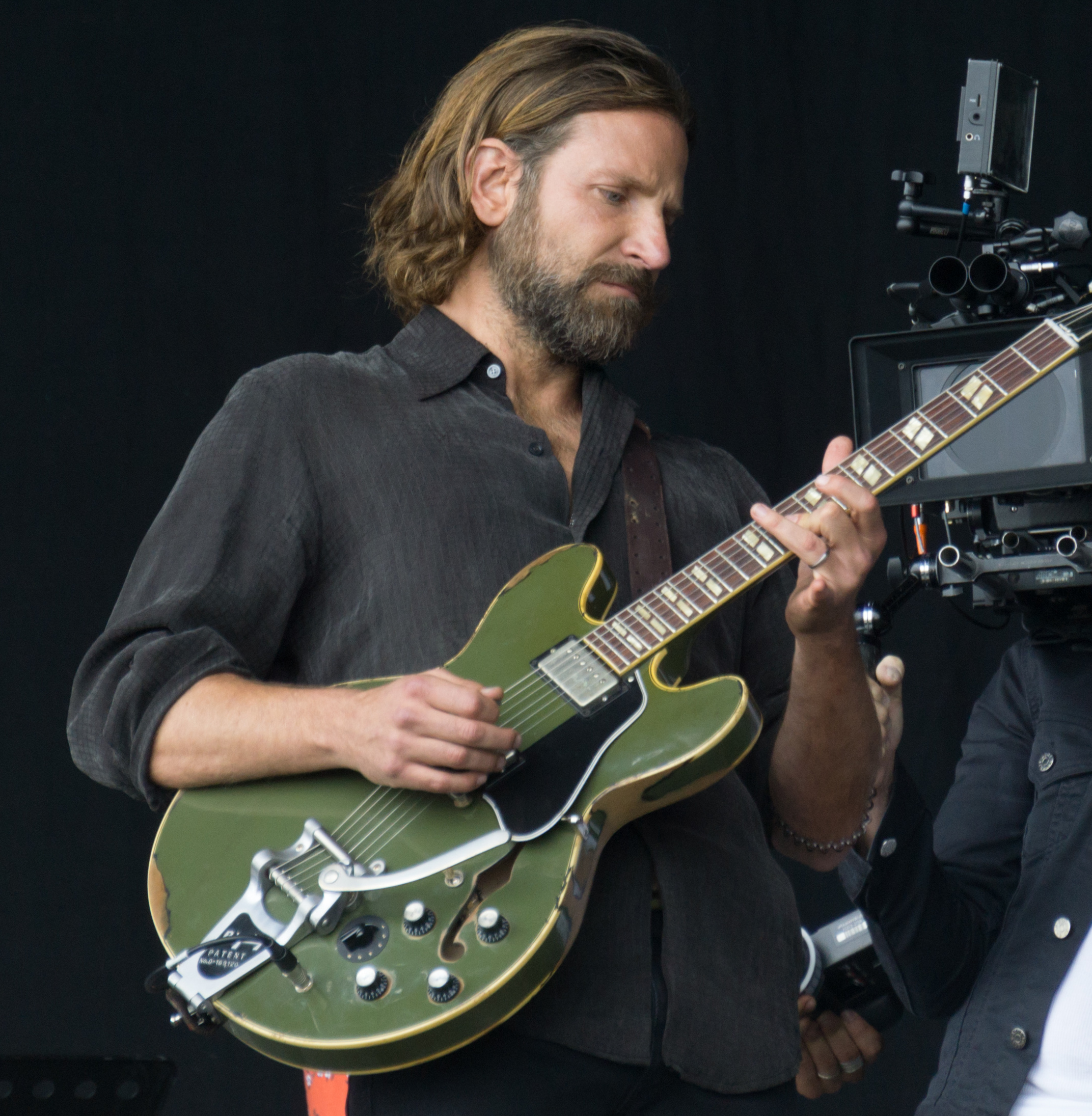
Cooper filming "Black Eyes" at Glastonbury 2017; his solo songs have been described primarily as blues rock.

The soundtrack of A Star Is Born has been described as primarily a pop, pop rock and blues rock album. It also incorporates elements of country, rock, folk rock, electropop, and dance-pop. An article by Paper divided the songs of the album into two categories: earthy tracks reminiscent of Joanne's rootsy style, and upbeat pop songs in the vein of Gaga's on-screen persona, Ally. The soundtrack conveys the film's plot through its musical progression, moving from Jackson's Americana through the pair's duets to Ally's flashier pop material, before culminating in "I'll Never Love Again". The album blends live and studio recordings with ambient noise and audience feedback, helping recreate the atmosphere of the film and its concert performances. According to Billboard's Karen Bliss, its lyrics are about wanting change, its struggle, love, romance, and bonding, describing the music as largely "timeless, emotional, gritty and earnest. They sound like songs written by artists who, quite frankly, are supremely messed up but hit to the core of the listener."

Cooper's solo tracks are in the genre of blues rock. "Black Eyes" is a rock and roll song with a grunge sound that opens with a blaring electric guitar; it has been compared to the style of Pearl Jam's Eddie Vedder. "Maybe It's Time" is an acoustic country-rock ballad performed in Cooper's husky baritone. Its lyrics reflect Jackson's recognition that he, and what he represents, must give way to others, while contemplating mortality, missed opportunities, and change. "Out of Time" is a guitar solo that serves as the instrumental lead-in to "Alibi", a track featuring Cooper's "snarly" vocals over piano and screeching guitars. Its lyrics offer a glimpse into Jackson's sordid lifestyle. "Too Far Gone" is a brief, emotionally tender country song, in which Jackson admits his shortcomings and reveals how his relationship with Ally redeemed him. It is driven by slide guitar, gentle piano, and a languid drum rhythm.

Gaga's solo tracks include a cabaret rendition of "La Vie en rose", on which she employs backphrasing by singing slightly behind the beat, allowing space for her vibrato to unfold. "Look What I Found" is a funky piano pop track inspired by musical theatre that relies on Gaga's upper register. Critics have compared it to Gaga's pre-The Fame material and the music of Carole King. Its lyrics capture the thrilling excitement of a new crush. The "moody" synth-pop track "Heal Me" utilizes a doctor metaphor for love; it has drawn comparisons to 1990s R&B and Mariah Carey's sound. "Hair Body Face" is a bass-filled pop song with an "urban dance groove", compared to music by Britney Spears and tracks from The Fame. Its lyrics address Ally's insecurities about her appearance, while the chorus offers redemption as she gains confidence from a lover urging her to ignore others' opinions. "Is That Alright?" is a vulnerable piano ballad, reminiscent of Adele's songs, in which Gaga shifts from belting to soft whispers as Ally pledges lifelong love to Jackson. "Why Did You Do That?" has been described as a campy dance-pop and retro-disco track, interspersed with xylophones in the beat. Its flirtatious lyrics–including the line "Why'd you come around me with an ass like that?"–and its repetitive chorus emphasize Ally's shift into a more bubbly, mainstream pop persona. "Before I Cry" is a "soaring", "somber" ballad about the aftermath of an argument. "Always Remember Us This Way" and "I'll Never Love Again" are power ballads, inspired by the music of the 1970s. The former reflects on the peak of a relationship with fondness and gratitude, while the latter deals with love and loss, with Gaga's vocal performance drawing comparisons to Whitney Houston's. Alongside the extended solo version, the soundtrack also contains the film edit of "I'll Never Love Again", which at its climax shifts from the orchestral performance to Cooper's acoustic rendition in a flashback of Jackson first singing the song to Ally.

"Music to My Eyes"
A 19-second sample of "Music to My Eyes", illustrating the soundtrack's rootsy country-rock sound, and the romantic connection the song conveys between Ally and Jackson.

The album includes several duets between Cooper and Gaga, in which Jackson's music gradually becomes softer as Ally brings a sense of emotional warmth into his life. "Shallow" evolves from a country song into a power ballad as Gaga moves into her higher vocal range in the chorus. Its lyrics depict Jackson and Ally questioning whether they are satisfied with who they are, while addressing stardom, addiction, and emotional vulnerability through a drowning metaphor. "Music to My Eyes" is a country-rock love ballad, inspired by the music of the 1950s, that portrays how collaborating on music brings Ally and Jackson closer together. "Diggin' My Grave" is a swampy, groove-driven blues song featuring Cooper's natural blues phrasing and Gaga's belting; its lyrics reflect on death and the loved ones left behind to lay the singer to rest. "I Don't Know What Love Is" is a soft rock duet whose lyrics center on the pair's declarations of love. Critics compared its interplay to Gaga's collaborations with Tony Bennett, while noting that her vocal delivery recalls Amy Winehouse.

== Release ==
The album's track list and release date were announced on August 30, 2018. Interscope Records described the soundtrack as containing 19 songs spanning multiple musical styles and 15 dialogue tracks intended to mirror the experience of watching the film. Commenting on this format, AllMusic's Erlewine wrote that it recalls Disney soundtrack records from the 1960s or 1970s, which often included dialogue to recreate the film experience. The soundtrack was released on October 5, 2018, on CD, vinyl, and digital formats, with an additional version omitting the dialogue excerpts made available exclusively via digital download and streaming platforms. The cover artwork was photographed by Peter Lindbergh and Clay Enos.

The soundtrack was released as a Special Deluxe Edition on December 14, 2018, which included the album on CD along with an exclusive fold-out poster booklet, three film posters, a 16-page photobook, and matte-finished clamshell box packaging with gold-foil text. Another version, the Limited Edition Soundtrack Collection, was released on April 12, 2019 as a two-piece, individually numbered box set with a gold-foil stamp, containing the soundtrack on exclusive gold-colored vinyl and standard CD, alongside an Ally-inspired lyric journal, five posters, four pieces of sheet music, ten lithographs, and two glossy publicity photos.

The album was also packaged together with the film in the A Star is Born - VIP Pass Edition, issued on November 25, 2019. The release includes the theatrical and "Encore" version of the film on blu-ray, the soundtrack on CD, three limited edition posters, a 32-page booklet and six exclusive artcards. Further bundle editions including both the soundtrack and the film were made available in select markets.

=== Promotion ===
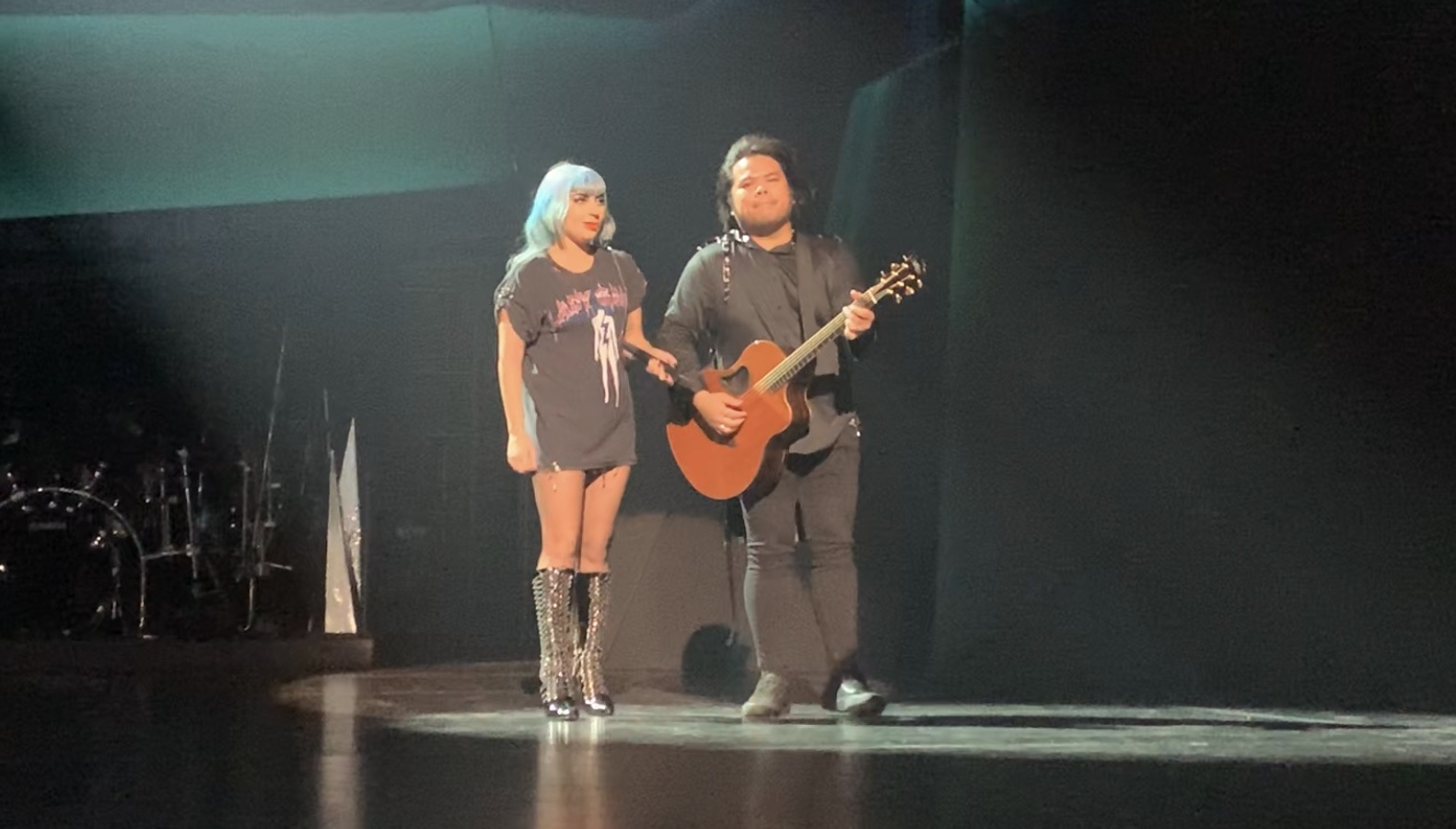
Lady Gaga on stage during the encore of her Enigma residency, as her guitarist plays the instrumentals of "Shallow"

As the songs were considered integral to the film's narrative, Interscope and Warner Bros. decided against releasing the soundtrack in advance, believing that doing so would spoil key scenes for audiences. As a result, the album was issued simultaneously with the film. The only exception was "Shallow", which was released as the lead single on September 27, 2018, after strong demand generated by the trailer and the film's early international premieres. The song was lauded by critics and enjoyed sustained commercial success well beyond its release, spending 45 weeks on the Billboard Hot 100 (Note: The longest run at the time for a Best Original Song Oscar winner.) and remaining on multiple European charts for months.

In December 2018, Gaga added "Shallow" as the encore to her Las Vegas residency, Enigma. During the show on January 26, 2019, Cooper joined Gaga for the performance. The same year, Gaga sang "Shallow" solo at the 61st Annual Grammy Awards in a glam rock rendition, accompanied on stage by the song's co-writers. Two weeks later, she reunited with Cooper to present it at the 91st Academy Awards. The performance was staged with the pair emerging from the audience and singing side by side at a piano, culminating in a close, shared-microphone finale. It was widely praised by critics, with some calling it the standout musical moment of the ceremony and highlighting the duo's onstage chemistry and intimate delivery. (Note: Attributed to multiple sources:)

Two further critically well-received (Note: Attributed to multiple sources:) singles followed in select territories. "Always Remember Us This Way" was released to radio in Italy and France in January 2019, with "I'll Never Love Again" following on French contemporary hit radio on May 27, 2019. They peaked at numbers 41 and 36 on the US Billboard Hot 100, respectively, and reached the top 20 in several international territories. (Note: Attributed to multiple sources:) Music videos for the three singles, as well as for "Look What I Found", were also released, featuring clips from the film.

== Critical reception ==
Professional ratings
Aggregate scores
Source	Rating
Metacritic	78/100
Review scores
Source	Rating
AllMusic	4/5 stars
Consequence	B
The Daily Telegraph	3/5 stars
The Guardian	4/5 stars
The New Zealand Herald	4/5 stars
NME	4/5 stars
Pitchfork	7.4/10
Rolling Stone	4/5 stars
Slant Magazine	2.5/5 stars
The Times	2/5 stars

The soundtrack received positive response from critics. At Metacritic, which assigns a normalized rating out of 100 to reviews from mainstream publications, the album has an average score of 78, based on 8 reviews, indicating "generally favorable reviews".

Mark Kennedy of The Washington Post called the soundtrack a "five-star marvel" and stated that it is a possible contender to win a Grammy Award. Nick Reilly of NME complimented the album's "emotionally charged songs that feel entirely appropriate for this heartfelt tale of doomed romance", adding that the album is "one of the best Hollywood soundtracks of recent years." Writing for The A.V. Club, Gwen Ihnat described the soundtrack as "an enjoyable yet poignant roller coaster of a listen". Rolling Stone's Brittany Spanos wrote that the album's early songs are "almost impenetrably perfect", praising their romantic yet powerful tone and suggesting they "should've been the template" for the rootsy direction Gaga pursued on Joanne. She added that as the soundtrack shifts to Ally's pop career, it delivers a run of catchy, The Fame-style singles that remain "deliciously fun" despite reflecting her artistic compromise.

AllMusic's Erlewine wrote, "All the songs make sense narratively and on their own, so they hold together well and would amount to a first-rate soundtrack", but criticized the dialogue included in the album. Wren Graves of Consequence felt the soundtrack succeeds largely due to the chemistry between the duo, praising Cooper's "professional-quality voice" and Gaga's ability to "play in different musical sandboxes". Although noting that the dialogue interludes and filler tracks sometimes "kill the emotional energy" of the album, he concluded that its "real joy" and "pleasure in the making of art" make it a compelling and authentic soundtrack.

Ben Beaumont-Thomas of The Guardian acknowledged that "Bradley Cooper shows he can sing as well as act and direct", but that "it is Lady Gaga's pop prowess that lifts each track, be it spectacular piano ballads or heart-rending duets". George Fenwick of The New Zealand Herald especially praised the second half of the album, and felt that while Cooper has strong vocals, he cannot keep up with Gaga, who "eventually steals the entire soundtrack." Similarly, Carl Wilson of Slate wrote that the soundtrack contains some of Gaga's "most stunning musical moments" of her career, while Cooper's performances are less compelling when heard apart from the film.

Larry Fitzmaurice of Pitchfork wrote that, at its best, the soundtrack "delivers on the promise of its star-wattage with some of the most affecting and emotionally overwhelming pop songs of the year". He considered the soundtrack's three singles its highlights, described "Maybe It's Time" as having a "quiet radiance", but found Cooper's other songs less distinctive and some of Ally's pop tracks weaker. Fitzmaurice concluded that the soundtrack was ultimately more effective within the context of the film than as a standalone listening experience. Craig Jenkins of Vulture felt the film "shines brightest in its music", praising the soundtrack's emotional impact and the contrast between Jackson's sturdy, time-worn songs and Ally's more modern pop material. He found Cooper strongest on the sadder songs, but thought his heavier rock numbers were less convincing and some of Ally's later pop tracks weaker than Gaga's more soulful performances. Patrick Ryan of USA Today wrote that the soundtrack proves "Shallow" was "no fluke", praising Gaga's ballads as among its standout moments and describing Cooper as a convincing musical performer, though he felt Ally's more commercial pop songs are intentionally bland and less memorable.

Chris DeVille of Stereogum opined that the soundtrack succeeds both as a narrative companion to the film and as a standalone pop record, though he wrote that it "could stand to go off the deep end more often". By contrast, Matt Miller of Esquire argued that many of the soundtrack's songs are so closely woven into the film's plot, emotional arc, and themes that they feel "fundamentally incomplete" on their own. Writing for The Daily Telegraph, Neil McCormick gave the album a moderately positive review, describing it as enjoyable but criticizing its "slightly awkward journey from rock balladry to slickly superficial pop" and the "weird disconnect" that emerges when it shifts into "anodyne modern pop". In a mixed review for Slant Magazine, Jeremy Winograd wrote that "there's undoubtedly a strong 10-song album lodged at the core of A Star Is Born", but argued that, unlike the film, whose emotional excess is grounded by the cast's restrained performances, the soundtrack lacks enough substance "to justify all the bombast." Will Hodgkinson of The Times was more negative, writing that the album "sounds like a dreary collection of earnest heartland rock", while adding that Gaga provides its main highlights through her expressive vocals and that Cooper's contributions are more generic.

The song "Why Did You Do That?" drew divided reactions, with some critics debating whether its trite lyrics and repetitive style were intentionally crafted to reflect Ally's shift into second-rate commercial pop. (Note: Attributed to multiple sources:) Diane Warren said it was meant to be fun and unserious rather than "bad", while Paul Blair argued that Jackson would have rejected any such song out of resentment over Ally's success. Gaga described it as the "antithesis" of where the character began, calling it "relatively shallow".

=== Year-end rankings ===
Uproxx ranked the soundtrack at number four on their list of 20 Must-Hear Pop Albums From 2018, with Chloe Gilke from the publication adding that "A Star Is Born could have gotten away with a lesser soundtrack, but it's all the more impressive for featuring some of the best pop music of 2018." Katie Atkinson from Billboard picked A Star Is Born as the 21st best release on their ranking of the 50 Best Albums of 2018, saying that "like the best soundtracks, this one truly resonates because it re-transports you to the world of [the film]", adding that the album "leaves you wanting more". James Rettig from Stereogum listed it as one of the Noteworthy Movie Soundtracks From 2018, adding that "As far as massive music blockbusters go, you can't do much better than A Star Is Born, which is sad and entertaining and romantic and ends up being pretty good at all of it."

=== Accolades ===
A Star Is Born won the British Academy Film Awards for Best Film Music and was nominated in the category of Best Soundtrack Album at the 9th Hollywood Music in Media Awards. Julianne Jordan and Julia Michels won in the categories for Outstanding Music Supervision at the same awards. It was nominated for a total of seven Grammy Awards, including two Song of the Year nominations. It won for Best Compilation Soundtrack for Visual Media. "Shallow" won the Best Pop Duo/Group Performance award, as well as the Best Song Written for Visual Media category. A year later, "I'll Never Love Again" won in the same category, making A Star Is Born the first movie which gained two wins in this category. "Shallow" received numerous further awards, including an Academy Award, Satellite Award, Critics' Choice Movie Award, and Golden Globe Award.

== Commercial performance ==
The A Star is Born soundtrack has sold more than 1.2 million copies worldwide. It was the fourth best-selling album of 2019 globally, and ranked second among female artists, behind Taylor Swift's Lover (3.2 million). Fuelled by the success of the soundtrack, Gaga also ranked as the ninth best-selling artist of 2019 globally, and fourth female overall, behind Swift, Billie Eilish and Ariana Grande. Worldwide, the album went on to sell 3.1 million copies by the end of 2019, and six million equivalent units overall.

=== North America ===
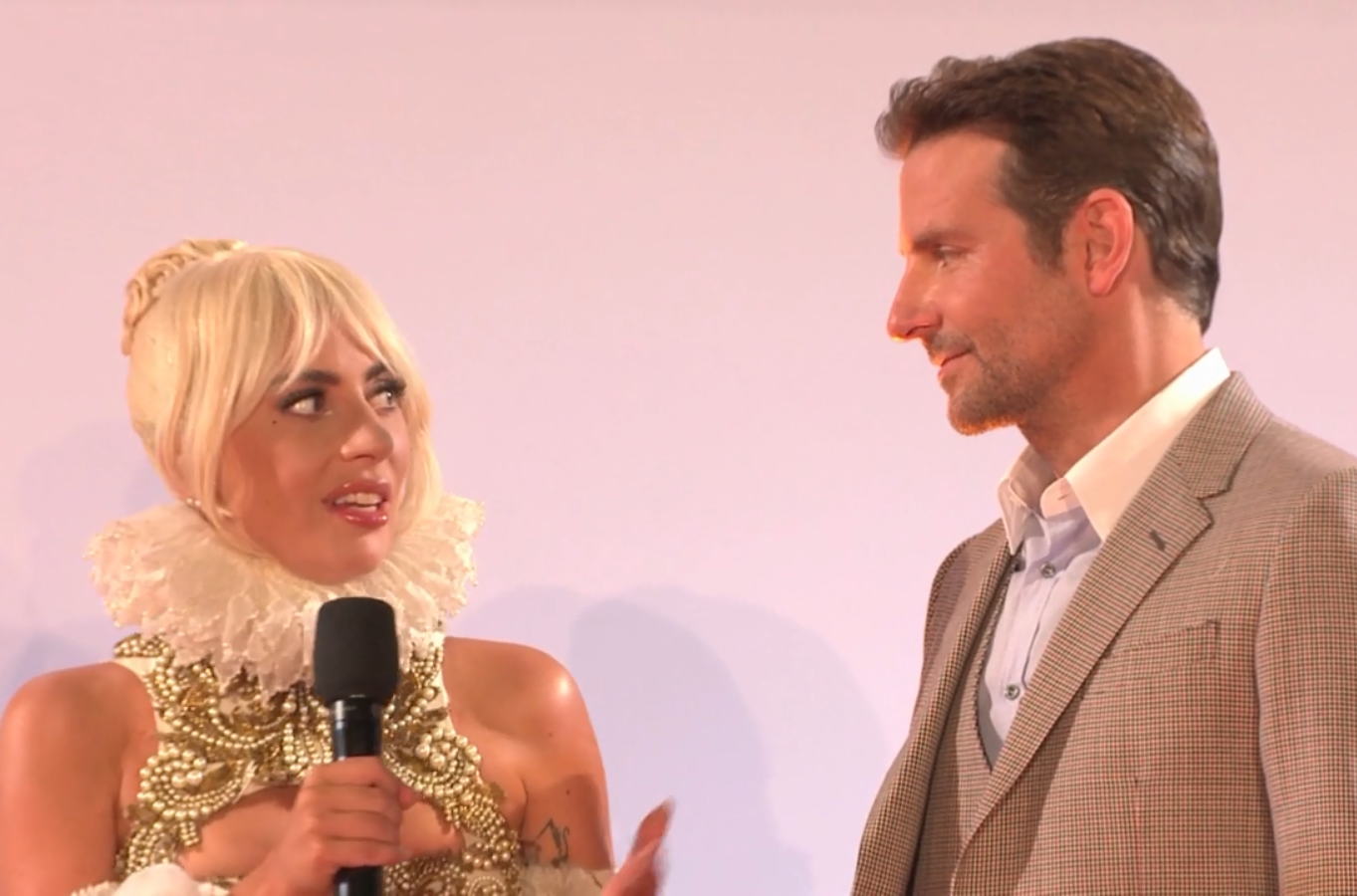
A Star Is Born became Gaga's longest running number-one album in the US, while it was Cooper's first album to top the charts.

A Star Is Born opened atop the US Billboard 200 with 231,000 album-equivalent units, including 162,000 pure album sales. It had the biggest overall sales week for a soundtrack in over three years, and is Gaga's fifth US number-one album as well as Cooper's first. Besides its pure album sales, A Star Is Born earned 37,000 in stream-equivalent units and 32,000 from track-equivalent units. The soundtrack spent a second week at number one there with 143,000 album-equivalent units (86,000 being pure sales), and became Gaga's second album to top the chart for two consecutive weeks after Born This Way (2011). It then held the top spot for a third week in a row with 109,000 equivalent units (61,000 pure sales), becoming the first soundtrack since High School Musical 2 in 2007 to top the chart for its first three weeks. Additionally, it became Gaga's longest running chart-topping album in the country. A Star Is Born was displaced one week later by Andrea Bocelli's Sì. The Recording Industry Association of America (RIAA) certified it double platinum for over two million album-equivalent units, while pure sales surpassed one million copies by March 2019. Following the 91st Academy Awards, the soundtrack returned to the top of Billboard 200 for a fourth non-consecutive week with 128,000 album-equivalent units (76,000 pure sales) on the chart dated March 9, becoming Gaga's longest running number-one album in the country and the first soundtrack to do so since Frozen (2013). The soundtrack went on to remain on the chart for 103 weeks. As of August 2019, the soundtrack has sold 1,148,000 copies within the United States, while it has earned 2.7 million equivalent album units in the country, according to Billboard's report in September 2020.

The soundtrack entered at number one on the Canadian Albums Chart, selling 18,000 equivalent units, earning the top sales and digital song download honors and the seventh highest on-demand streams for the week. It was Gaga's third album to reach the summit in the nation and her first since Born This Way. A Star Is Born held the top position for the next week, with another 12,000 equivalent units and was also the top-selling album. It had an 11% increase in sales during the third week and remained atop the charts, selling close to 14,000 equivalent units. Like in the United States, the soundtrack became Gaga's longest running chart-topping album in Canada. By the year-end, the soundtrack had sold 92,000 copies (155,000 equivalent units) in the country according to Nielsen SoundScan, and was certified Platinum by Music Canada (MC). The Academy Awards boosted the soundtrack up to its tenth week at the top of the charts, selling another 12,000 units.

=== Europe ===
A Star Is Born faced competition in the United Kingdom from Twenty One Pilots' Trench album, with the midweek chart suggesting the latter to emerge as the top album. A Star Is Born pulled ahead at the last moment according to Alan Jones from Music Week, and debuted atop the UK Albums Chart with 31,816 units (including 6,178 from stream-equivalent units). It became Gaga's fourth album to reach number one in the nation and her first since Artpop (2013), as well as Cooper's first entry on the chart. The soundtrack fell to number two the following week behind Jess Glynne's Always In Between, selling 24,732 equivalent units. For the week ending November 1, 2018, the soundtrack moved back atop the chart with 24,982 copies sold (including 6,645 from sales-equivalent streams). "Shallow" also reached the top of the UK Singles Chart that week, giving Gaga and Cooper an Official UK Chart double, this being Gaga's third time to do so. The soundtrack received a 2× Platinum certification from the British Phonographic Industry (BPI) for selling over 600,000 units in the country.

A Star Is Born opened at number one in both Ireland and Scotland, and was Gaga's third number one in the former. During its eleventh week atop the Irish chart, the soundtrack attained its highest sales tally, helped by the release of the Special Deluxe Edition. In France, the soundtrack sold 8,700 copies and debuted at number seven on the SNEP Albums Chart, before reaching number one 20 weeks later with 9,700 copies sold. It was the 22nd best-selling album of the year in France in 2018. The Syndicat National de l'Édition Phonographique (SNEP) certified the record Diamond for 500,000 equivalent units and it had sold a total of 200,000 pure copies by May 2019.

=== Oceania ===
In Australia, A Star Is Born entered at number three on the ARIA Albums Chart, giving Gaga her seventh top 10 album in the country and her sixth to reach the top three. Two weeks later, the soundtrack peaked at number one, becoming Gaga's third album to reach the top of the Australian chart after The Fame Monster and Born This Way. The soundtrack debuted at number six in the New Zealand Albums Chart, and reached number one in its third week. A Star Is Born became the year's longest running number-one album in Australia at 11 weeks (ranking at number three on the year-end charts) and was certified triple platinum by the Australian Recording Industry Association (ARIA) for selling over 210,000 units. In New Zealand, it topped the charts for 16 weeks, breaking the record for most consecutive weeks at the top, previously held by Ed Sheeran's album ÷, and was certified 7× platinum for 105,000 equivalent units by the Recorded Music NZ (RMNZ).

== Track listing ==
Standard version
No.	Title	Writer(s)	Producer(s)	Length
1.	"Intro"			0:20
2.	"Black Eyes" (performed by Bradley Cooper)	Cooper; Lukas Nelson; Alberto Bof	Cooper; Nelson; Lady Gaga^{[a]}^{[b]}	3:03
3.	"Somewhere Over the Rainbow" (dialogue; featuring Lady Gaga)			0:42
4.	"Fabulous French" (dialogue; featuring Cooper, Gaga, Anthony Ramos & Shangela Laquifa Wadley)			0:20
5.	"La Vie en rose" (performed by Gaga)	Louiguy; Édith Piaf	Gaga; Brian Newman	3:00
6.	"I'll Wait for You" (dialogue; featuring Cooper & Gaga)			0:19
7.	"Maybe It's Time" (performed by Cooper)	Jason Isbell	Cooper; Benjamin Rice; Gaga^{[a]}	2:40
8.	"Parking Lot" (dialogue; featuring Cooper & Gaga)			0:30
9.	"Out of Time" (performed by Cooper)	Cooper; Nelson	Cooper; Nelson	2:52
10.	"Alibi" (performed by Cooper)	Gaga; Cooper; Nelson	Gaga; Cooper; Nelson	3:03
11.	"Trust Me" (dialogue; featuring Cooper & Gaga)			0:32
12.	"Shallow" (performed by Gaga & Cooper)	Gaga; Mark Ronson; Anthony Rossomando; Andrew Wyatt	Gaga; Rice	3:35
13.	"First Stop, Arizona" (dialogue; featuring Cooper & Gaga)			0:10
14.	"Music to My Eyes" (performed by Gaga & Cooper)	Gaga; Nelson	Nelson	3:19
15.	"Diggin' My Grave" (performed by Gaga & Cooper)	Paul Kennerley	Gaga; Nelson	3:57
16.	"I Love You" (dialogue; featuring Cooper & Gaga)			0:19
17.	"Always Remember Us This Way" (performed by Gaga)	Gaga; Natalie Hemby; Hillary Lindsey; Lori McKenna	Dave Cobb; Gaga	3:30
18.	"Unbelievable" (dialogue; featuring Gaga & Rafi Gavron)			0:28
19.	"How Do You Hear It?" (dialogue; featuring Cooper & Gaga)			0:14
20.	"Look What I Found" (performed by Gaga)	Gaga; Mark Nilan Jr.; Nick Monson; Paul "DJWS" Blair; Nelson; Aaron Raitiere	Gaga; Nilan; Monson; Blair	2:55
21.	"Memphis" (dialogue; featuring Cooper & Gaga)			0:24
22.	"Heal Me" (performed by Gaga)	Gaga; Nilan; Monson; Blair; Julia Michaels; Justin Tranter	Gaga; Nilan; Monson; Blair	3:16
23.	"I Don't Know What Love Is" (performed by Gaga & Cooper)	Gaga; Nelson	Gaga^{[c]}; Nelson; Nilan^{[b]}; Monson^{[b]}	2:57
24.	"Vows" (dialogue; featuring Gaga)			0:17
25.	"Is That Alright?" (performed by Gaga)	Gaga; Nilan; Monson; Blair; Nelson; Raitiere	Gaga; Nilan; Monson; Blair	3:10
26.	"SNL" (dialogue; featuring Alec Baldwin, Don Roy King, Michael Mancini & Gena Rositano)			0:13
27.	"Why Did You Do That?" (performed by Gaga)	Gaga; Diane Warren; Nilan; Monson; Blair	Gaga; Nilan; Monson; Blair	3:04
28.	"Hair Body Face" (performed by Gaga)	Gaga; Nilan; Monson; Blair	Gaga; Nilan; Monson; Blair; Rice^{[d]}	3:22
29.	"Scene 98" (dialogue; featuring Cooper & Gaga)			0:35
30.	"Before I Cry" (performed by Gaga)	Gaga; Nilan; Monson; Blair	Gaga; Nilan; Monson; Blair	4:18
31.	"Too Far Gone" (performed by Cooper)	Cooper; Nelson	Cooper; Nelson	1:26
32.	"Twelve Notes" (dialogue; featuring Gaga & Sam Elliott)			1:03
33.	"I'll Never Love Again" (film version) (performed by Gaga; contains dialogue featuring Cooper & Gaga)	Gaga; Hemby; Lindsey; Raitiere	Gaga; Rice	4:40
34.	"I'll Never Love Again" (extended version) (performed by Gaga)	Gaga; Hemby; Lindsey; Raitiere	Gaga; Rice	5:28
Total length:				70:01

Version without dialogue
No.	Title	Length
1.	"Black Eyes"	3:03
2.	"La Vie En Rose"	3:00
3.	"Maybe It's Time"	2:40
4.	"Out of Time"	2:52
5.	"Alibi"	3:03
6.	"Shallow"	3:37
7.	"Music to My Eyes"	3:19
8.	"Diggin' My Grave"	3:57
9.	"Always Remember Us This Way"	3:30
10.	"Look What I Found"	2:55
11.	"Heal Me"	3:16
12.	"I Don't Know What Love Is"	2:57
13.	"Is That Alright?"	3:10
14.	"Why Did You Do That?"	3:04
15.	"Hair Body Face"	3:22
16.	"Before I Cry"	4:18
17.	"Too Far Gone"	1:26
18.	"I'll Never Love Again" (film version) (radio edit)	4:40
19.	"I'll Never Love Again" (extended version)	5:28
Total length:		63:37

Notes

- ^{^[a]} – additional vocal production
- ^{^[b]} – additional production
- ^{^[c]} – main and additional production
- ^{^[d]} – vocal production

== Credits and personnel ==
Personnel adapted from A Star Is Born soundtrack liner notes and AllMusic.

=== Management ===
- Published by Sony/ATV Songs LLC / SG Songs LLC (BMI) / Happygowrucke / Creative Pulse Music/These Are Pulse Songs (BMI).
- All rights administered by These Are Pulse Songs, BIRB Music (ASCAP) / BMG Rights Management (US) LLC
- Warner Tamerlane Publishing Corp. / Super LCS Publishing / One Tooth Productions (BMI), Warner-Barham Music LLC (BMI)
- Extra administration by Songs of Universal (BMI) / Warner-Olive Music LLC (ASCAP) admin. by Universal Music Corp. (ASCAP)
- Recorded at Greek Theater, Shrine Auditorium, Regent Theatre (Los Angeles, California) , EastWest Studios, The Village West (Los Angeles), Saturday Night Live set in NBC Studios, Woodrow Wilson Studios (Hollywood, California), Shangri-La Studios (Malibu, California), Five Star Bar (Los Angeles), The Virgil (Los Angeles), and the Coachella Valley Music and Arts Festival
- Mixed at Electric Lady Studios (New York City)
- Mastered at Sterling Sound Studios (New York City)

=== Production ===
- Dae Bennett – engineer
- Paul Blair – composer, producer
- Bobby Campbell – executive producer, producer
- Dave Cobb – producer
- Tom Elmhirst – dialogue mixing, mixing
- Lisa Einhorn-Gilder – production coordination
- Bradley Cooper – composer, primary artist, producer
- Bill Gerber – executive producer
- Ashley Gutierrez – executive assistant
- Natalie Hemby – composer
- Darren Higman – executive producer
- Jason Isbell – composer
- Gena Johnson – engineer
- Julianne Jordan – music supervisor
- Paul Kennerley – composer
- Lady Gaga – additional production, composer, horn arrangements, piano, producer, string arrangements, vocal producer
- Brian Lambert – executive in charge of music
- Hillary Lindsey – composer
- Louiguy – composer
- Lori McKenna – composer
- Randy Merrill – mastering
- Joe Nino-Hernes – lacquer cutting
- Kari Miazek – coordination
- Nick Monson – additional production, composer, guitar, keyboards, piano, producer, programming, string arrangements, vocals (background)
- Amanda Narkis – executive in charge of music
- Lukas Nelson – composer, guitar, guitar (acoustic), guitar (electric), producer
- Brian Newman – producer, trumpet
- Mark Nilan Jr. – additional production, composer, horn arrangements, keyboards, piano, producer, programming, string arrangements
- Julia Michaels – composer
- Julia Michels – music supervisor
- Jon Peters – executive producer
- Édith Piaf – composer
- Aaron Raitiere – composer
- Benjamin Rice – engineer, producer, vocal producer, vocals (background)
- Mark Ronson – composer
- Anthony Rossomando – composer
- Anthony Seyler – executive producer
- Ivy Skoff – coordination, string coordinator
- Eddie Spear – engineer
- JoAnn Tominaga – coordination, string contractor
- Justin Tranter – composer
- Diane Warren – composer
- Andrew Wyatt – composer

=== Music ===
- Brian Allen – bass
- Charlie Bisharat – violin
- Alberto Bof – keyboards
- Jacob Braun – celli
- Brockett Parsons – keyboards
- Jon Drummond – bass
- Andrew Duckles – viola
- Alma Fernandez – viola
- Daniel Foose – bass
- Paul Francis – drums
- Grant Garibyan – violin
- Gary Grant – trumpet
- Lila Hood – violin
- Benjamin Jacobson – violin
- Chris Johnson (drummer) – drums
- Steve Kortyka – saxophone
- Marisa Kuney – violin
- Songa Lee – violin
- Melvin "Maestro" Lightford – keyboards
- Shigeru Logan – viola
- Anthony LoGerfo – drums
- David Low – celli
- Andy Martin – trombone
- Corey McCormick – bass
- Serena McKinney – violin
- Tato Melgar – percussion
- Pablo Mendez – violin
- Leah Metzler – celli
- Joel Peskin – sax (baritone)
- Chris Powell – drums
- Leroy Powell – pedal steel guitar
- Kate Reddish – viola
- Tom Scott – contractor, sax (tenor)
- Jesse Siebenberg – lap steel guitar
- Alex Smith – piano
- Tim Stewart – guitar
- Ricky Tillo – guitar
- Adrienne Woods – celli

=== Additional personnel ===
- Alec Baldwin – featured artist
- Rob Bisel – assistant
- Bo Bodnar – assistant
- Brandon Bost – assistant
- Paul Broucek – executive in charge of music
- Sam Elliott – featured artist
- Rafi Gavron – featured artist
- Don Roy King – featured artist
- Michael Mancini – featured artist
- D.J. Shangela Pierce – featured artist
- Anthony Ramos – featured artist
- John Rooney – assistant
- Gena Rositano – featured artist
- Tyler Shields – assistant
- Alex Williams – assistant
- Matt Wolach – assistant

=== Artwork ===
- Peter Lindbergh – photography
- Clay Enos – photography

== Charts ==
=== Weekly charts ===
Weekly chart performance for A Star Is Born Soundtrack
Chart (2018–2021)	Peak position
Argentinian Albums (CAPIF)	3
Australian Albums (ARIA)	1
Austrian Albums (Ö3 Austria)	2
Belgian Albums (Ultratop Flanders)	1
Belgian Albums (Ultratop Wallonia)	4
Canadian Albums (Billboard)	1
Croatian International Albums (HDU)	1
Czech Albums (ČNS IFPI)	1
Danish Albums (Hitlisten)	1
Dutch Albums (Album Top 100)	3
Estonian Albums (IFPI)	1
Finnish Albums (Suomen virallinen lista)	5
French Albums (SNEP)	1
German Albums (Offizielle Top 100)	4
Greek Albums (IFPI Greece)	1
Hungarian Albums (MAHASZ)	11
Icelandic Albums (Tónlistinn)	2
Irish Albums (Official Charts)	1
Italian Albums (FIMI)	4
Japan Hot Albums (Billboard Japan)	14
Japanese Albums (Oricon)	12
Japanese International Albums (Oricon)	4
Lithuanian Albums (AGATA)	1
Mexican Albums (AMPROFON)	3
New Zealand Albums (RMNZ)	1
Norwegian Albums (VG-lista)	1
Polish Albums (ZPAV)	1
Portuguese Albums (AFP)	1
Scottish Albums (Official Charts)	1
Slovak Albums (ČNS IFPI)	1
South African Albums (RiSA)	4
South Korean Albums (Circle)	37
South Korean International Albums (Circle)	1
Spanish Albums (Promusicae)	2
Swedish Albums (Sverigetopplistan)	58
Swiss Albums (Schweizer Hitparade)	1
UK Albums (Official Charts)	1
UK Soundtrack Albums (Official Charts)	1
US Billboard 200	1
US Soundtrack Albums (Billboard)	1
US Indie Store Album Sales (Billboard)	1

=== Year-end charts ===
Year-end chart performance for A Star Is Born Soundtrack
Chart (2018)	Position
Australian Albums (ARIA)	3
Austrian Albums (Ö3 Austria)	9
Belgian Albums (Ultratop Flanders)	56
Belgian Albums (Ultratop Wallonia)	42
Canadian Albums (Billboard)	31
Danish Albums (Hitlisten)	76
Dutch Albums (MegaCharts)	33
Estonian Albums (Eesti Ekspress)	45
French Albums (SNEP)	28
German Albums (Offizielle Top 100)	42
Hungarian Albums (MAHASZ)	54
Icelandic Albums (Tónlistinn)	23
Irish Albums (IRMA)	2
Italian Albums (FIMI)	48
Mexican Albums (AMPROFON)	44
New Zealand Albums (RMNZ)	4
Norwegian Albums (VG-lista)	19
Polish Albums (ZPAV)	47
Portuguese Albums (AFP)	12
South Korean International Albums (GAON)	10
Spanish Albums (PROMUSICAE)	60
Swedish Albums (Sverigetopplistan)	19
Swiss Albums (Schweizer Hitparade)	7
UK Albums (Official Charts)	7
US Billboard 200	37
US Soundtrack Albums (Billboard)	3
Worldwide (IFPI)	4

Chart (2019)	Position
Australian Albums (ARIA)	4
Austrian Albums (Ö3 Austria)	12
Belgian Albums (Ultratop Flanders)	7
Belgian Albums (Ultratop Wallonia)	11
Canadian Albums (Billboard)	1
Croatian International Albums (HDU)	4
Czech Albums (ČNS IFPI)	4
Danish Albums (Hitlisten)	1
Dutch Albums (Album Top 100)	22
French Albums (SNEP)	7
German Albums (Offizielle Top 100)	26
Hungarian Albums (MAHASZ)	55
Icelandic Albums (Tónlistinn)	9
Irish Albums (IRMA)	7
Italian Albums (FIMI)	22
Mexican Albums (AMPROFON)	32
New Zealand Albums (RMNZ)	7
Norwegian Albums (VG-lista)	2
Polish Albums (ZPAV)	2
Portuguese Albums (AFP)	2
Spanish Albums (PROMUSICAE)	43
Swedish Albums (Sverigetopplistan)	7
Swiss Albums (Schweizer Hitparade)	2
UK Albums (Official Charts)	9
US Billboard 200	3
US Soundtrack Albums (Billboard)	1
Worldwide (IFPI)	4

Chart (2020)	Position
Australian Albums (ARIA)	81
Belgian Albums (Ultratop Flanders)	46
Belgian Albums (Ultratop Wallonia)	78
Canadian Albums (Billboard)	45
Danish Albums (Hitlisten)	21
Dutch Albums (Album Top 100)	27
French Albums (SNEP)	40
Icelandic Albums (Tónlistinn)	57
Italian Albums (FIMI)	86
Norwegian Albums (VG-lista)	13
Polish Albums (ZPAV)	31
Spanish Albums (PROMUSICAE)	71
Swedish Albums (Sverigetopplistan)	57
Swiss Albums (Schweizer Hitparade)	57
US Billboard 200	137
US Soundtrack Albums (Billboard)	4

Chart (2021)	Position
Belgian Albums (Ultratop Flanders)	52
Belgian Albums (Ultratop Wallonia)	102
Danish Albums (Hitlisten)	37
Dutch Albums (Album Top 100)	43
French Albums (SNEP)	150
Italian Albums (FIMI)	94
Norwegian Albums (VG-lista)	28
US Soundtrack Albums (Billboard)	5

Chart (2022)	Position
Belgian Albums (Ultratop Flanders)	71
Belgian Albums (Ultratop Wallonia)	163
Danish Albums (Hitlisten)	58
Dutch Albums (Album Top 100)	43
US Soundtrack Albums (Billboard)	10

Chart (2023)	Position
Danish Albums (Hitlisten)	99
Dutch Albums (Album Top 100)	65
US Soundtrack Albums (Billboard)	11

Chart (2024)	Position
Dutch Albums (Album Top 100)	72
US Soundtrack Albums (Billboard)	13

Chart (2025)	Position
Dutch Albums (Album Top 100)	73
US Soundtrack Albums (Billboard)	16

=== Decade-end charts ===
Decade-end chart performance for A Star Is Born Soundtrack
Chart (2010–2019)	Position
Australian Albums (ARIA)	46
Norwegian Albums (VG-lista)	28
US Billboard 200	33

== Certifications and sales ==
Certifications and sales for A Star Is Born Soundtrack
Region	Certification	Certified units/sales
Australia (ARIA)	3× Platinum	210,000^{‡}
Austria (IFPI Austria)	3× Platinum	45,000^{‡}
Belgium (BRMA)	Gold	10,000^{‡}
Canada (Music Canada)	3× Platinum	240,000^{‡}
Denmark (IFPI Danmark)	6× Platinum	120,000^{‡}
France (SNEP)	Diamond	500,000
Germany (BVMI)	Platinum	200,000^{‡}
Ireland	—	37,000
Italy (FIMI)	3× Platinum	150,000^{‡}
New Zealand (RMNZ)	7× Platinum	105,000^{‡}
Norway (IFPI Norway)	4× Platinum	80,000^{‡}
Poland (ZPAV)	2× Diamond	200,000^{‡}
Portugal (AFP)	Platinum	15,000^{^}
Singapore (RIAS)	Platinum	10,000^{*}
South Korea	—	3,432
Spain (Promusicae)	Gold	20,000^{‡}
Switzerland (IFPI Switzerland)	Platinum	20,000^{‡}
United Kingdom (BPI)	2× Platinum	600,000^{‡}
United States (RIAA)	2× Platinum	2,000,000^{‡}
Summaries
Worldwide	—	6,000,000
^{*} Sales figures based on certification alone.^{^} Shipments figures based on certification alone.^{‡} Sales+streaming figures based on certification alone.

== Release history ==
Release dates and formats for A Star Is Born Soundtrack (Note: Additional bundle editions combining the film and soundtrack were released in select markets.)
Region	Date	Format	Edition(s)	Label	Ref.
Various	October 5, 2018	Digital download; Streaming; CD; LP	Standard; Without dialogue (Note: Available digitally and via streaming only.)	Interscope	
Japan	November 7, 2018	CD; LP	Standard	Interscope	
Various	December 14, 2018	CD	Special Deluxe Edition	Interscope	
United States	April 4, 2019	LP+CD	Limited Edition Soundtrack Collection	Interscope	
Various	November 25, 2019	CD+Blu-ray	VIP Pass Edition	Interscope	

== See also ==
- List of artists who have achieved simultaneous UK and US number-one hits
- List of Billboard 200 number-one albums of 2018
- List of number-one albums of 2018 (Australia)
- List of number-one albums of 2019 (Belgium)
- List of number-one albums of 2018 (Canada)
- List of number-one albums of 2019 (Canada)
- List of number-one albums from the 2010s (Denmark)
- List of number-one albums of 2018 (Ireland)
- List of number-one albums from the 2010s (New Zealand)
- List of number-one hits of 2019 (France)
- List of number-one albums in Norway
- List of number-one albums of 2019 (Poland)
- List of number-one albums of 2019 (Portugal)
- List of number-one albums of 2018 (Scotland)
- List of number-one hits of 2018 (Switzerland)
- List of UK Albums Chart number ones of the 2010s
- List of UK Album Downloads Chart number ones of the 2010s
