= DJ White Shadow =

American music producer, musician, songwriter and DJ

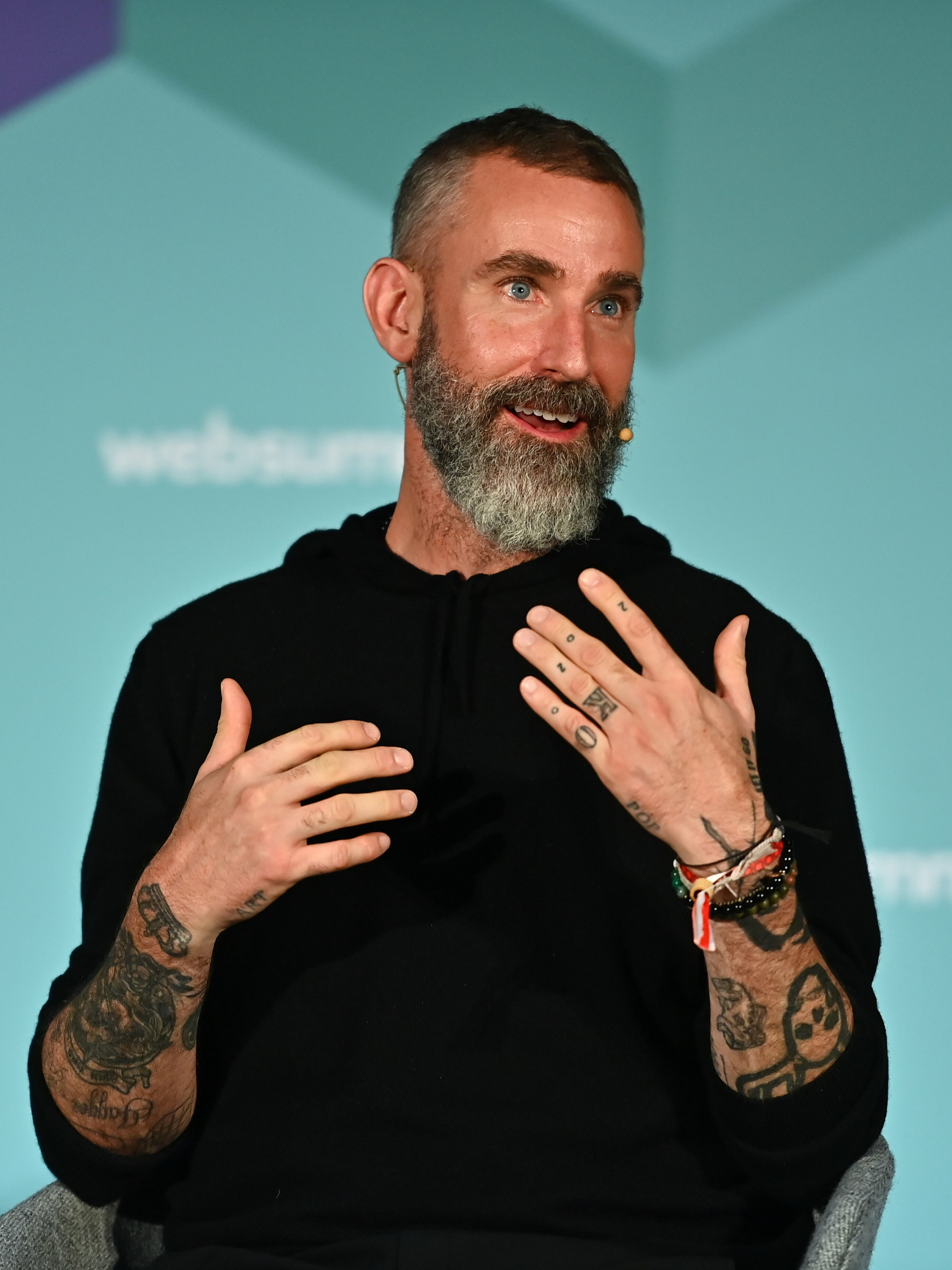
- DJ White Shadow in 2022

Background information
- Also known as: DJWS
- Born: Paul Edward Blair; September 20, 1978 (age 47); Youngstown, Ohio, U.S.
- Origin: Chicago, Illinois, U.S.
- Occupations: Producer; DJ
- Website: djwhiteshadow.com

Paul Edward Blair (born September 20, 1978), known by his stage name DJ White Shadow and sometimes written as DJWS, is an American music producer, musician, songwriter and DJ. He served as a producer for Lady Gaga's albums, Born This Way and Artpop. Blair also produced and wrote songs with Gaga on the soundtrack for the 2018 film, A Star Is Born. He has played in numerous cities throughout the United States and has toured as a headliner. Blair has also toured with Lady Gaga internationally.

In addition to his writing and producing, he has released three EPs as part of a Trilogy through DECON Records. Blair was featured in the Anheuser-Busch Pac-Man commercial for Super Bowl XLIX, the song for which he remixed using the original Pac-Man music. His remixes have appeared in other television commercials including for Beats by Dre. Blair won a Grammy Award in 2020 for his work on the A Star Is Born soundtrack.

Outside of music, Blair is a Non-fungible token (NFT) enthusiast and collector. He has collaborated on NFT projects and also launched his own social token ($DJWS) in 2022.

== Early life and education ==
Paul Edward Blair spent his younger years on a farm in Ohio and started collecting records when he was in second grade. His family moved to Detroit, Michigan, when he was in fifth grade and he purchased his first set of turntables at the age of 16. Growing up in Detroit, he used to sneak out of his house to go to Techno shows when he was 15 years old. Blair learned Japanese when he was younger and attended Western Michigan University where he studied international business. His first year at WMU, he entered a Japanese exchange program in order to study abroad.

Blair was 17 when he held his first residency, playing at the Delta Market while attending college in Takamatsu, Japan. He got the residency by asking the owner to play some records one night at the bar. The owner invited Blair back to play every Thursday night which turned into his first official residency. Despite performing as a DJ earlier in his lifetime, it was in Japan that he started getting paid to perform.

== Career ==
After returning from Japan, Blair worked in various clubs and performed at parties throughout the midwest. He gained prominence in the Detroit techno scene and moved around from Detroit to New York prior to settling in Chicago. He eventually began playing for corporate clients that included Google, Nike, Playboy, and Guinness. He held residence at it-nightspot Hyde in Los Angeles where he eventually ran into Lady Gaga.

Blair met Lady Gaga during one of his shows in Los Angeles, and went on to help write and produce nine songs on her second studio album, Born This Way. He co-wrote and produced the album's title track "Born This Way" which went to number one on various charts and was nominated for a Grammy Award. Following the release of the album, Blair toured with Gaga for two years, performing with Gaga and working on different projects. Blair continued to work with Gaga, co-writing and producing much of her Artpop album which was released in 2013. He co-wrote the lead single "Applause" which reached #1 on numerous charts and was performed live by Gaga at the 2013 MTV Video Music Awards. For Artpop, Blair worked with Gaga recording 70 to 100 songs, later performing at ArtRave, a two-day event hosted by Gaga to promote the album. Blair is also credited with partnering R Kelly with Lady Gaga for the song "Do What U Want", the second song from the album, also remixing a version of the song.

In addition to Lady Gaga, Blair has remixed songs for various other artists. In 2010 he remixed "Fall in Love" and "Freak", two singles from Estelle that were later released as part of her 2012 album All of Me. The following year he remixed two songs that appeared on Kitsuné Maison Compilation 12: The Good Fun Issue, also playing at the album release party. In 2012 Blair remixed a version of Chris Brown's song "Don't Wake Me Up". His remix also appeared on Brown's Germany Digital Remix EP of the same song. Blair also mixed Time of Our Lives a compilation released by Pitbull and Ne-Yo in 2014. Blair has released three EPs as part of a trilogy through Decon Records. The first of which was I'm Killing Me, a five-song compilation that he released for free on his own website in 2011. The second, Pussy, Drugs, Fear, was released in 2013, with the third, The Clock is Ticking, released the same year. Releases from the trilogy were featured in articles with Billboard, including the title track "The Clock Is Ticking", the video for which depicts a man's life story from conception through death. The video to the song "Fear" was described by Billboard as one that skewers the images of violence that constitute our cultural notion of fear.

Blair's work in music took him to television when was hired by Anheuser-Busch to work on its #upforanything campaign for the 2015 Super Bowl. He was featured in the company's "Coin" advertisement that featured a life size maze resembling the 1980 video game Pac-Man. The music for the commercial was a remix of the original Pac-Man music, mixed by DJ White Shadow himself. Blair also worked with Namco on the project, the copyright holder to the original Pac-Man.

In 2015, Blair was named the North American music director of W Hotels where he continues to oversee musical branding in over 25 of the company's locations. In 2016, W Hotels partnered with Billboard on an emerging artist series called Next Up that Blair also worked on. Blair was also the man behind the hotel chain's "W Sound Suites" which are recording studios located within select W Hotels and available to touring musicians. The first W Sound Suite was inaugurated in May 2016 at W Bali - Seminyak. The first North American Sound Suite opened in April 2017 at W Seattle.

After the launch of the Sound Suite in Seattle, Blair announced that he had recently finished six weeks of studio work with Lady Gaga. In September 2017, the soundtrack for My Little Pony: The Movie was released which Blair executive produced. That same month, he headlined the Green Tie Ball to benefit Gateway Green in Chicago. In October, Lady Gaga revealed that Blair would be the main producer on her next album for A Star Is Born. Blair has referred to Joanne album as the "little sister" of Gaga's 4th studio album, Artpop.

In 2018, he co-wrote and produced 6 of the 19 songs on the soundtrack for Lady Gaga and Bradley Cooper's 2018 film, A Star Is Born. The soundtrack debuted at number 1 on the Billboard 200 chart and won the Grammy Award for Best Compilation Soundtrack for Visual Media.

Blair collaborated with artist Romero Britto in 2021 on a NFT project to benefit St. Jude Children's Research Hospital.

== Discography ==
=== Extended plays ===
List of EPs, with year released
| Title | Album details |
|---|---|
| I'm Killing Me | Released: 2011; Label: Decon Records; Formats: Digital download |
| Pussy Drugs Fear | Released: 2013; Label: Decon Records; Format: Digital download |
| The Clock Is Ticking | Released: 2013; Label: Decon Records; Format: Digital download |

=== Production ===
| Year | Title | Artist | Album |
|---|---|---|---|
| 2002 | "Yu-Gi-Oh! Theme" | Yu-Gi-Oh! | Yu-Gi-Oh! Music to Duel By |
| 2002 | "Time to Duel" | Yu-Gi-Oh! | Yu-Gi-Oh! Music to Duel By |
| 2002 | "I'm Back" | Yu-Gi-Oh! | Yu-Gi-Oh! Music to Duel By |
| 2002 | "Exodia" | Yu-Gi-Oh! | Yu-Gi-Oh! Music to Duel By |
| 2002 | "World of Yu-Gi-Oh!" | Yu-Gi-Oh! | Yu-Gi-Oh! Music to Duel By |
| 2004 | "For The People" | The Black Eyed Peas | Yu-Gi-Oh! The Movie |
| 2004 | "One Card Short" | James Chatton | Yu-Gi-Oh! The Movie |
| 2004 | "Step Up" | Jean Rodriguez | Yu-Gi-Oh! The Movie |
| 2004 | "Shadow Games" | Trixie Reiss | Yu-Gi-Oh! The Movie |
| 2004 | "It's Over" | Fatty Koo | Yu-Gi-Oh! The Movie |
| 2004 | "U Better Fear Me" | The Deleted | Yu-Gi-Oh! The Movie |
| 2004 | "Power Within" | Dan Metreyeon | Yu-Gi-Oh! The Movie |
| 2004 | "Believe In" | Skwib | Yu-Gi-Oh! The Movie |
| 2011 | "Born This Way" | Lady Gaga | Born This Way |
| 2011 | "The Edge of Glory" | Lady Gaga | Born This Way |
| 2011 | "Government Hooker" | Lady Gaga | Born This Way |
| 2011 | "Americano" | Lady Gaga | Born This Way |
| 2011 | "Bloody Mary" | Lady Gaga | Born This Way |
| 2011 | "Black Jesus + Amen Fashion" | Lady Gaga | Born This Way |
| 2011 | "Bad Kids" | Lady Gaga | Born This Way |
| 2011 | "Highway Unicorn (Road to Love)" | Lady Gaga | Born This Way |
| 2011 | "Electric Chapel" | Lady Gaga | Born This Way |
| 2013 | "Applause" | Lady Gaga | Artpop |
| 2013 | "Do What U Want" | Lady Gaga; R. Kelly | Artpop |
| 2013 | "Venus" | Lady Gaga | Artpop |
| 2013 | "Sexxx Dreams" | Lady Gaga | Artpop |
| 2013 | "Jewels N' Drugs" | Lady Gaga; T.I; Too Short; Twista | Artpop |
| 2013 | "Manicure" | Lady Gaga | Artpop |
| 2013 | "Artpop" | Lady Gaga | Artpop |
| 2013 | "Swine" | Lady Gaga | Artpop |
| 2017 | "Swish Swish" | Katy Perry; Nicki Minaj | Witness |
| 2017 | "Save as Draft" | Katy Perry | Witness |
| 2017 | "Sexy Body" | Pitbull; Jennifer Lopez | Climate Change |
| 2017 | "Dedicated" | Pitbull; R. Kelly; Austin Mahone | Climate Change |
| 2017 | "Thank You for Being a Friend" | Rachel Platten | My Little Pony: The Movie |
| 2017 | "Can You Feel It" | DNCE | My Little Pony: The Movie |
| 2017 | "I'll Chase the Sky" | Jessie James Decker | My Little Pony: The Movie |
| 2017 | "No Better Feelin'" | CL | My Little Pony: The Movie |
| 2017 | "Neighsayer" | Lukas Nelson | My Little Pony: The Movie |
| 2018 | "Look What I Found" | Lady Gaga | A Star Is Born |
| 2018 | "Heal Me" | Lady Gaga | A Star Is Born |
| 2018 | "Is That Alright?" | Lady Gaga | A Star Is Born |
| 2018 | "Why Did You Do That?" | Lady Gaga | A Star Is Born |
| 2018 | "Hair Body Face" | Lady Gaga | A Star Is Born |
| 2018 | "Before I Cry" | Lady Gaga | A Star Is Born |
| 2024 | "Guilty Pleasure" | JoJo Siwa | Guilty Pleasure |

=== Remixes ===
| Year | Title | Artist |
|---|---|---|
| 2010 | "Fall in Love (DJ White Shadow Remix)" | Estelle |
| 2010 | "Freak (DJ White Shadow Remix)" | Estelle |
| 2011 | "Born This Way (DJ White Shadow Remix)" | Lady Gaga |
| 2011 | "Judas (Dj White Shadow Remix)" | Lady Gaga |
| 2011 | "Scheiße (DJ White Shadow Remix)" | Lady Gaga |
| 2012 | "Don't Wake Me Up (Dj White Shadow Remix)" | Chris Brown |
| 2014 | "Applause (DJ White Shadow Trap Remix)" | Lady Gaga |
| 2014 | "Applause (DJ White Shadow Electrotech Remix)" | Lady Gaga |
| 2014 | "Do What U Want (DJ White Shadow Remix)" | Lady Gaga; R. Kelly |
| 2014 | "Time of Our Lives" | Pitbull; Ne-Yo |
| 2015 | "DJ White Shadow vs. PacMan" | Namco |
| 2019 | "Go Go Power Rangers (DJ White Shadow Remix)" | Ron Wasserman |
| 2019 | "EDENへ (Remixed by DJ White Shadow)" | UVERworld |
