= Maybe It's Time =

2018 song by Bradley Cooper from A Star Is Born

Song by Bradley Cooper

from the album A Star Is Born
- Released: October 5, 2018
- Recorded: 2017
- Studio: The Village West (Los Angeles, California)
- Venue: Glastonbury Festival
- Genre: Americana; folk; country; country rock
- Length: 2:39
- Label: Interscope
- Songwriter: Jason Isbell
- Producers: Bradley Cooper; Benjamin Rice

Official audio
- "Maybe It's Time" on YouTube

"Maybe It's Time" is a song from the 2018 film A Star Is Born and the soundtrack of the same name, performed by Bradley Cooper. It was written by Jason Isbell and produced by Cooper and Benjamin Rice. After listening to producer Dave Cobb's work, Cooper approached him to help shape the sound of the soundtrack album. At the time, Cobb was recording an album in Nashville with Isbell, and asked him to write a song for the soundtrack based on Cooper's character, Jackson Maine. Isbell completed the song in 2017, and it was later recorded at the Glastonbury Festival and The Village West in Los Angeles, after Cooper composed the melody and produced it with Rice.

Written to help define Jackson Maine's character, "Maybe It’s Time" is a melancholic guitar-led ballad about change, salvation, and redemption. Journalists have described it as Americana, folk, country, and country rock. The song received positive reviews from music critics, who praised Cooper's vocals and the composition, and considered it one of the soundtrack's most sensitive and soulful tracks. Commercially, it became Cooper's first solo entry on the Billboard Hot 100, where it debuted at number 93, and was later certified gold by the Recording Industry Association of America. The song also charted in Canada, Australia, New Zealand, and several European territories.

== Background and development ==
After listening to producer Dave Cobb's work, actor Bradley Cooper, who was also directing A Star Is Born (2018), approached him to craft the accompanying soundtrack album's sound. Cobb was recording an album in Nashville, Tennessee, with American singer-songwriter and guitarist Jason Isbell, and Cooper eventually asked the latter to write a song for the soundtrack. Isbell was initially reluctant to get involved, later describing himself as a "hard critic" and saying he was wary of working on the project at first. However, he changed his mind after encouragement from his wife and after reading the screenplay, which he said struck him as "honest and human" and free of anything that made him "cringe". Isbell also recalled that he had been asked to write a song that would help define Jackson Maine's character (portrayed by Cooper), and after reading the screenplay, he felt the project had the potential to become something he could be proud of.

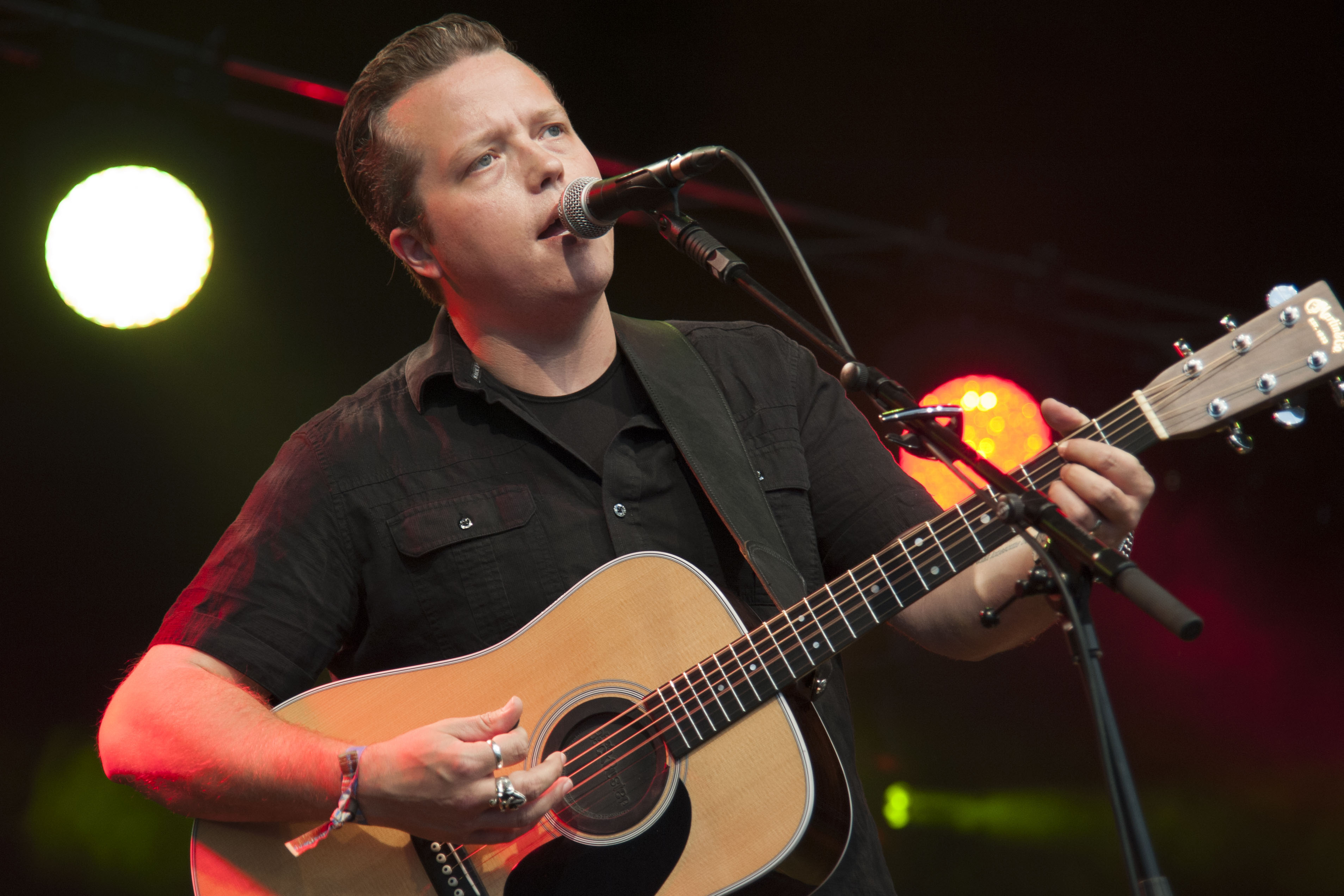
"Maybe It's Time" was written by American singer-songwriter and guitarist Jason Isbell (pictured in 2014).alt=Jason Isbell performing with an acoustic guitar, wearing a black shirt and singing into a microphone.

Isbell asked to see the screenplay and got in touch with Cooper to understand his requirements for the track and to discuss the character or Jackson. He also recalled that the involvement of musicians such as Lukas Nelson and Mark Ronson, as well as Lady Gaga, convinced him that the film's music would be handled with legitimacy. Cooper wanted a realistic song and urged Isbell to put his own thoughts as a songwriter into the lyrics, resulting in "Maybe It's Time", a song about grappling with change. As Isbell composed the song, he kept in mind the "idea of salvation and redemption throughout the story and the movie, how that's something that comes from within an individual". In an interview with Harper's Bazaar he explained: "That’s what the song deals with more than anything else—whether you reach the point of redemption or not is wholly determined on your own willingness to work. If you’re going to change, it has to come from within." Meanwhile, Cooper worked closely with Lukas Nelson for about a year before recording the song, practicing guitar and honing his vocal skills for the role. Nelson said that Cooper's "ear is already trained and developed because he sings along to his favorite songs and he knows when it sounds bad." Cooper received further support from vocal coach Roger Love.

When Cobb flew to Los Angeles and met Cooper and his co-star Lady Gaga for a writing session, he played "Maybe It's Time". They applauded the track, and it became Jackson's signature song and set the tone for the rest of the soundtrack. Cooper felt the Americana folk rock blend of the tune fit perfectly with Jackson's character, highlighting his fading career and substance abuse problems. After writing the song, Isbell received calls from both Cooper and Gaga expressing their enthusiasm for it. Although he initially had doubts about whether Cooper could perform the track convincingly, Cooper later sent him a demo recording, which reassured Isbell and led him to approve the performance. Isbell later said he was surprised by how much Cooper cared about getting the song right.

"Maybe It's Time" was written by Isbell, composed by Cooper, and produced by Cooper and Benjamin Rice, with additional vocal production by Lady Gaga. Recording took place at the Glastonbury Festival and The Village West in Los Angeles. Cooper said "Maybe It's Time" became "the staple, the sword with which a lot of the music spawned" from him for the rest of the soundtrack.

== Use in film and composition ==
"Maybe It's Time"
A 16-second sample of "Maybe It's Time", showcasing its sparse Americana and country arrangement, Cooper's rugged baritone, and lyrics that journalists identified as central to the song's meaning.

In A Star Is Born, the Jackson character sings "Maybe It's Time" for the first time in a drag bar after meeting Ally and seeing her performing a cover of "La Vie en rose". It is heard several times during the film. Its central lyrics—"Maybe it's time to let the old ways die"—are a metaphor for many of A Star Is Born's central themes, including dealing with and attaining true love and the "double-edged sword of fame". The line is repeated a number of times in the song, accompanied by the line: "It takes a lot to change a man, hell, it takes a lot to try".

Reviewing the film for Vox, Alissa Wilkinson suggested the song's lyrics signal that the Jackson character, including his music, lifestyle, and what he represents, needs to step aside to "make room for others"—in this case Gaga's character Ally. Esquire's Matt Miller viewed it as an "existential meditation on mortality and missed chances", while Consequence Of Sound's Wren Graves considered it "a quiet look at a changing world". Slate's Carl Wilson compared it to the work of American singer-songwriter Townes Van Zandt, while Nick Reily of NME felt the "slow guitar confessional" recalled songs by Kris Kristofferson (who had played the central character in the 1976 version of the film).

Musically, "Maybe It's Time" has been described as an acoustic Americana, folk country, and country rock ballad. It is performed in the key of G major with a moderate tempo of 80 beats per minute in common time. It follows a chord progression of G–C–G–C during the verses and G–Em–D–C–G during the chorus, and the vocals span from B_{3} to B_{4}. Cooper delivers the song in a rugged baritone.

== Critical reception ==
Brittany Spanos of Rolling Stone described "Maybe It's Time" as a "sullen triumph of a song" and complimented Cooper's vocal delivery. USA Today's Patrick Ryan wrote that the song is a "wistful" album highlight. It has been called "affective", "soulful", "authentic", and "beautiful" in reviews by AllMusic, Thrillist, The Plain Dealer, and The Daily Telegraph, respectively. Jeremy Winogard of Slant Magazine felt that, alongside "Too Far Gone", it convincingly evokes the kind of "festival-circuit troubadour" Jackson Maine is meant to represent. The Washington Post's Bethonie Butler found it vulnerable and swooning, with a Sam Elliott-inspired vocal delivery. The Guardian's Ben Beaumont-Thomas described it as an "extremely strong" country ballad.

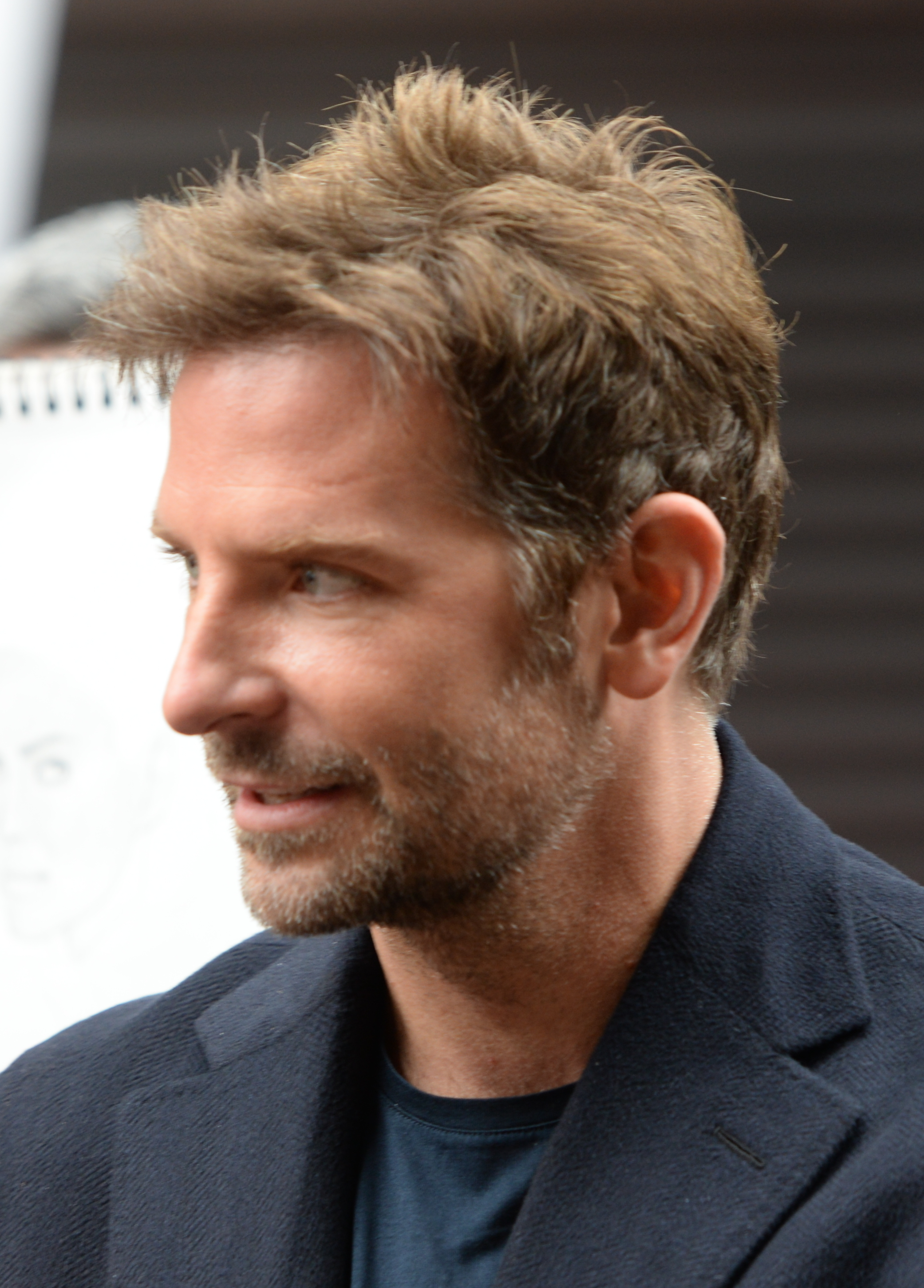
Bradley Cooper's performance was positively received.

Several critics, including journalists from Stereogum and Consequence of Sound, considered it the soundtrack's best track. Alyssa Bereznak of The Ringer also regarded it as one of the strongest songs from A Star Is Born, writing that it gives Jackson Maine a "rare moment of vulnerability" while also allowing Cooper to showcase the "husky baritone he trained so hard to reach". Rob Harvilla of the same publication wrote that "Maybe It's Time" succeeded in establishing Jackson Maine as a superstar and Cooper as a credible enough singer to portray him, largely owing to Jason Isbell's songwriting. Similarly, NME's Nick Reily opined that the song benefited from Isbell's involvement as a songwriter, adding that it marked the moment when Cooper came across most convincingly as "a genuine rock star".

Dann Gire of the Daily Arlington Herald found that "Maybe It's Time" portrayed more of a nostalgia for Cooper's character as an artist on the decline, "rather than the optimistic challenge of new talent he undoubtedly was when he first sang it". Jeremy Gordon of The Outline argued that the track could serve as a campaign song for a future American presidential candidate advocating generational and political change. He interpreted its refrain about letting "the old ways die" as applicable to abandoning entrenched ideas such as social conservatism, white supremacy, and idealized narratives of American history. Gordon concluded that the "catchy track summed up all these sentiments better than any fight song".

Larry Fitzmaurice of Pitchfork described "Maybe It's Time" as a "simple, sincere" song that "possesses a quiet radiance", singling it out from Cooper's other songs, which he found less distinctive and more anonymous in style. Carl Wilson of Slate similarly viewed it as the lone highlight among Cooper's contributions, writing that his songs on the soundtrack were "mostly gray zones that one has to sit through, waiting for Gaga to come back". Chris DeVille of Stereogum likewise contrasted the song with Jackson's otherwise "strictly serviceable" material, praising its distinct personality and perspective, and adding: "In its quietness, it comes through loud and clear." By comparison, Vulture's Natalie Walker wrote that she "much prefer[s] Bradley Cooper/Jackson Maine's harder-edged songs" from A Star Is Born.

== Commercial performance ==
Following the soundtrack's release, "Maybe It's Time" debuted at number 93 on the Billboard Hot 100 chart, becoming Cooper's first solo entry and second overall, after lead single, "Shallow" (with Gaga). The song also reached number six on the Digital Songs chart, along with other tracks by Cooper, like "Black Eyes" and "Music to My Eyes". According to Nielsen SoundScan, it had sold 116,000 copies in the United States as of March 2019, and was later certified gold by the Recording Industry Association of America for surpassing 500,000 units in combined sales and streams.

In Canada the track entered the Hot Canadian Digital Songs chart at number 12; it debuted on the Canadian Hot 100 at number 86. In Australia peaked at number 58 on the ARIA Charts, while in New Zealand the track debuted on the country's Hot Singles chart at number 16. Across Europe, "Maybe It's Time" became Cooper's solo entry in Hungary, Scotland and Switzerland, and on the download charts of France and the United Kingdom. It was later certified silver by the British Phonographic Industry (BPI) in the United Kingdom and platinum by Pro-Música Brasil in Brazil.

== Other versions and performances ==
On October 22, 2018, Jason Isbell performed "Maybe It's Time" live at Ryman Auditorium in Nashville, as part of his show's encore. In 2020, Isbell released his own demo of the track on Bandcamp alongside the previously unreleased song "Alabama Sky". Tom Breihan of Stereogum wrote that Isbell's rendition underscored how naturally the song fit within his own catalog, describing it as a simple, conversational performance of a track that had by then become something of a "cultural touchstone". Wren Graves of Consequence of Sound opined that although Cooper's singing as Jackson Maine was "surprisingly good", Isbell remained the stronger vocalist, praising the demo for its clearer phrasing, conversational tone, brighter acoustic guitar, and understated emotional delivery giving the song a renewed immediacy.

Pearl Jam's Eddie Vedder covered the song live at Tempe, Arizona's Innings Festival in 2019, and later performed it once again at BottleRock Napa Valley 2024 in a duet with Cooper. English singer Dido covered it in 2019 at BBC Radio 2.

== Credits and personnel ==
Credits adapted from the liner notes of A Star Is Born.

=== Management ===
- Published by Southeastern Records Publishing (BMI) / Warner-Barham Music LLC (BMI) admin. by Songs of Universal (BMI)
- Recorded at Glastonbury Festival and The Village West (Los Angeles, California)
- Mixed at Electric Lady Studios (New York City)
- Mastered at Sterling Sound Studios (New York City)

=== Personnel ===
- Bradley Cooper – vocals, composer, producer
- Jason Isbell – lyricist
- Benjamin Rice – producer, recording, mixing
- Lady Gaga – additional vocal producer
- Alex Williams – recording assistant
- John Rooney – mixing assistant
- Randy Merrill – audio mastering
- Lukas Nelson – acoustic guitar
- Jesse Siebenberg – lap steel guitar

== Charts ==
Weekly chart performance for "Maybe It's Time"
Chart (2018)	Peak position
Australia (ARIA)	58
Canada Hot 100 (Billboard)	86
France Downloads (SNEP)	35
Hungary (Single Top 40)	14
New Zealand Hot Singles (RMNZ)	16
Scottish Singles Sales (Official Charts)	22
Switzerland (Schweizer Hitparade)	82
UK Singles Downloads (Official Charts)	32
US Billboard Hot 100	93

== Certifications and sales ==
Certifications and sales for "Maybe It's Time"
Region	Certification	Certified units/sales
Brazil (Pro-Música Brasil)	Platinum	40,000^{‡}
France (SNEP)	Gold	100,000^{‡}
New Zealand (RMNZ)	Gold	15,000^{‡}
United Kingdom (BPI)	Silver	200,000^{‡}
United States (RIAA)	Gold	500,000^{‡}
^{‡} Sales+streaming figures based on certification alone.
