= Shaun McDowell =

British painter and curator

- Born: 9 April 1981 (age 45); Sussex, England, United Kingdom
- Education: Reigate School of Art (2000-2002)
- Alma mater: Chelsea College of Art and Design (2002-2005)

Shaun McDowell (born 1981, Sussex) is a British painter and curator working in Lazio, Italy.

Known for making colourful abstract paintings, he has occasionally displayed sculpture. His work has been compared to Willem de Kooning, Frank Auerbach and Cy Twombly in terms of its gesture, colouration and visceral quality.

== Career ==
A founding member of Lyndhurst Way, McDowell first gained recognition as proponent of the emerging art scene in Peckham and has been represented by Hannah Barry London since 2008.

In 2007 and 2008 McDowell displayed large sculpture for the first two years of what has become a major annual sculpture show in London - 'Bold Tendencies'. In 2009 McDowell showed painting in the "Peckham Pavilion" during Venice Biennale.

In April 2011 McDowell opened his solo show New Paintings at the Hannah Barry Gallery in Peckham, South London. In 2017 McDowell showed a large series of works for a solo exhibition 'Islands of Ours' at Titanic Belfast Museum, Northern Ireland.

As a curator McDowell has invited young artists to show alongside older established ones including - Howard Hodgkin, Robert Crumb, Varda Caivano, Rose Wylie, (E-E) Evgenij Kozlov, Pavel Pepperstein, Lara Viana and Raoul De Keyser.

== Critical reception ==
A Financial Times article in 2012 noted the influence of Jean-Honoré Fragonard and called McDowell “the most exciting abstract painter of his generation” while a 2013 Prospect Magazine article titled 'British Painting is back' speaks about the physical, visceral quality of his work and a resurgence in British painting. Barnaby Wright of the Courtauld Institute has spoken of him in connection with Frank Auerbach as a keeper of the Auerbach flame - "His work, like Auerbach’s, occupies a space between figurative and pure abstraction”.

== Peckham art scene ==
In a 2007 Timeout article titled 'Peckham Art Squats' McDowell cites Lyndhurst Way and Peckham as the environment that supported a new wave of creative vision in South London. In the article writer Ossian Ward speaks about the potential for a shift in the London art landscape that was to indeed later unfold -

"With the possibility of co-opting another building around the corner in Vestry Road, it seems that history might be repeating itself in Peckham and that the London art world is shifting southwards, just as it migrated east in the 1980s and ’90s”.
