= Millie Brown (performance artist) =

English performance artist

Millie Brown (born 1986 in London, UK) is an English performance artist known for her work involving vomiting. She rose to prominence after a series of collaborations with musician Lady Gaga. She is also a founding member of the !WOWOW! Collective of London, England. She began her career at age 17 on a Berlin stage where she vomited onto a canvas after drinking glasses of dyed milk, a performance that lasted for two hours.

== Works ==
Millie Brown has performed variations of her vomit painting, as well as other forms of performance art.

=== Rainbow Body ===
Her solo exhibition, Rainbow Body, Brown conveyed the aesthetic of the Los Angeles Sky through vomiting pastel dyed almond milk onto canvases. Inspired by Tibetan Buddhist theology, she created the exhibition based on three elements of “ground, presence, and energy”.

=== Rainbow Body Performance ===
At the Gazelli Art House in London, Brown displayed her body in a gallery window, suspended by rope from the ceiling for her piece Rainbow Body Performance. Crystal prisms dangled from her suspended body creating rainbow reflections around the gallery space.

=== Suspended by Optimism ===
In 2014, Brown suspended herself from giant helium balloons for four hours at the entrance of the Miami Beach Resort and Spa for her exhibition Suspended by Optimism. The exhibition opened for Nicole Ehrlich's second annual gala honoring women in art.

=== The Wilting Point ===
Brown's exhibition, The Wilting Point took place at the Refinery Hotel of New York in a rotating gallery called “Hatbox”. She laid down in meditation surrounded by freshly cut flowers for seven days with no food, surviving off of only water, as the flowers wilted and decayed around her. The performance was on a 24-hour global live feed on the V Magazine website.

=== Collaboration with Lady Gaga ===
Millie Brown is well known for her work with Lady Gaga. They collaborated on a video together in 2009, implementing Brown's dyed milk and vomit painting. Brown and Lady Gaga collaborated on a performance of the singer's song, "Swine" at the SXSW conference in 2014. Brown drank green milk and then regurgitated it onto Lady Gaga's chest.

== Criticism ==
Since her work with Lady Gaga, Brown has been criticized for “glamorizing bulimia”. Much of the disapproval took place on Twitter, with Demi Lovato tweeting, “Bulimia isn’t cool. Young people who are struggling to figure out their identities are seriously influenced by the things they see their idols do.” Brown responded to the outrage over her work by saying, “I’m using my body to create something beautiful. I think it’s misunderstood by a lot of people. But it really doesn’t have anything to do with eating disorders. If I was male [no one would make] such a massive association."

== Personal life ==
She now works and resides in Los Angeles, California.
