= Nicole Ehrlich =

American producer

- Born: May 28, 1975 (age 51)
- Education: Smith College
- Occupations: Creative, Producer, Executive Producer
- Spouse: Cat Cora (m. 2018; div. 2021)
- Children: 2
- Awards: Emmy award Grammy award MTV VMA award
- Website: nicoleehrlich.me

Nicole Stacy Ehrlich is an American producer, director, and women's rights activist. She is best known for her production of music videos, and her work with Lady Gaga. Ehrlich has previously worked for Extasy Records, Geffen Records, and Universal Music Group. Her work also includes full-length music DVDs and television production. As a producer of documentaries, her works include the 2015 film The Hunting Ground. In the world of visual art, she is the curator of the annual Art Basel Miami exhibition Celebration of Women in Art.

She is the SVP of Creative and Celebrity Relations and has been the recipient of Grammy, MTV VMA and Emmy Awards.

== Education ==
Ehrlich is a graduate of Smith College. Her first short films, created while attending college, won the Best Young Media Artist award at the Utah Short Film Festival and the Best Experimental film award at the New Orleans Film Festival. She also received an internship operating a technocrane at Panavision.

== Career ==
In August 2002 Ehrlich was hired as a video commissioner at Extasy Records and eventually promoted to the head of video production. In 2008 Ehrlich became the video commissioner for Geffen Records. That year she appeared as a judge on the television series Redemption Song, which featured musical artists from the Fuse and Geffen labels. In 2011 she was a Vice President with the Universal Music Group. She later became the CEO and a creative producer at Rocket In My Pocket. She has also spoken at conferences regarding music video production.

=== Music videos ===
In 2005 Ehrlich co-produced the music videos assembled for Blink-182: Greatest Hits DVD and for Lighthouse's music DVD Lighthouse: Live in Portland!. In 2007 she produced Loose: The Concert for Nelly Furtado.

In 2010 Ehrlich was named in the nominations for the Best Collaboration, Best Choreography, and Video of the Year awards at the MTV Video Music Awards, for her work in co-producing the Lady Gaga video for Telephone. The video won the MTV award for Best Collaboration. She was also named in nine nominations for co-producing the Lady Gaga video Bad Romance, from which the video won the Best Female Video, Best Pop Video, Best Dance Music Video, Best Direction, Best Editing, Best Choreography, and Video of the Year awards. Then in 2011 Ehrlich was awarded the Grammy for Best Short Form Music Video for the video, which she co-produced with Heather Helier.

At the 2011 VMAs, Ehrlich was named in four nominations, including nominations for Best Female Video, Best Choreography, and Best Art Direction for the Lady Gaga video Born this Way (winning for Best Female Video), in addition to co-producing the Best Choreography nominated video Party Rock Anthem by LMFAO. She received the credit as creative producer and producer for the Lady Gaga album Born This Way: The Collection. In 2011 she also produced the television specials Lady Gaga Presents: The Monster Ball Tour at Madison Square Garden and A Very Gaga Thanksgiving.

In January 2014 Ehrlich began co-producing the Lady Gaga video G.U.Y at Hearst Castle, released in March 2014. She has worked with other artists including The Cure, Snoop Dogg, Usher, Mary J. Blige, Blink-182, Enrique Iglesias, Tony Bennett, Weezer, Wiz Khalifa and Quincy Jones on music production projects. In 2016 Ehrlich won the Primetime Emmy Award for Outstanding Original Music and Lyrics for her work on the Lady Gaga video Til It Happens to You.

=== Television and film production ===
In addition to music videos, Ehrlich has also produced television commercials featuring Usher shot for Samsung, Lady Gaga for Google Chrome, in addition to President Barack Obama for Code.org, which she also directed. In 2006 she produced the television documentary Dropped, and in 2010 she was the executive producer for the video documentary Another Station: Another Mile. In 2011 she executive produced the television movie Inside: El DeBarge, produced the television film Countdown to: Mindless Behavior, and was co-producer for the horror film Detention. She also founded the company Rocket in my Pocket, as well as Valis Studios. In 2015 she served as a producer for the film The Hunting Ground, which was nominated for an Emmy award.

=== Art exhibitions ===
Since 2013 Ehrlich has curated the annual Art Basel Miami exhibition Celebration of Women in Art in Miami Beach, the goal of which is "to raise the representation of women in art museums, galleries, and shows," according to the Miami New Times. In 2015 she also produced the Rainbow Body solo exhibition by artist Millie Brown.

== Personal life ==
Ehrlich has hosted charity events for the Born This Way Foundation, and is a women's rights and anti-bullying activist. She is a proponent of female artists, stating that, "statistics show that although 51% of visual artists are women, only 5% of the current art displayed in U.S. museums is made up of women."

Ehrlich is openly lesbian and has two sons with her ex-partner, Rosa Ehrlich, whom she started dating in 1998. She began dating professional chef Cat Cora since 2017, and they married April 21, 2018, in Santa Barbara, California. Ehrlich filed for divorce in 2021.
