= Matthew Stone =

British artist (born 1982)

Matthew Stone (born 1982 in London, England) is a London-based artist. He is part of the South London art collective !Wowow!.

Stone graduated from Camberwell College of Arts, London in 2004. He currently stages performances and films. In 2007, his first solo show, entitled "Futurehindsight", took place at UNION in London. In November 2009, Stone topped the arts section in a "Power players Under 30" list compiled by the Sunday Times. Stone frequently collaborates with FKA Twigs and created the album artwork for 2019's Magdalene.

In November 2011, Stone had an exhibition at Kathy Grayson's "The Hole" Gallery entitled Optimism as Cultural Rebellion, the same name as his blog. Stone has had subsequent exhibitions at the Hole in 2018, 2020 and 2023.

Stone paints with AI.
