= Oliver Griffin =

British visual artist (born 1983)

- Born: 1983 (age 42–43); Boscombe, United Kingdom
- Education: Falmouth University
- Known for: Becoming a core member living at 78 Lyndhurst Way
- Website: olivergriffin.co.uk

Oliver Griffin (born 1983) is a British visual artist currently living and working in London and Berlin.

== Early career ==
Born in Boscombe in 1983, Griffin studied Photography at Falmouth College of Arts, now Falmouth University. Upon graduation in 2006 he moved to London to live at 78 Lyndhurst Way where he became a core member of the eponymous artists' collective, participating in exhibitions and events in the house and local area. It was there that he first met Hannah Barry, who curated exhibitions at the house and later championed the work of Lyndhurst Way artists through her gallery. In 2007 he was involved in the establishment of Bold Tendencies, an ongoing annual arts and sculpture festival held on the upper floors and roof of a disused multi-story car park in Peckham.

== Artistic practice ==
Griffin is best known for his typologies of objects and situations that explore the mundane, the boring, and the everyday; these primarily take the form of photographic prints, sculptures and artist's books. His subjects include house-keys, domestic ceilings, light switches, fence panels, his glasses, parked cars, and skid marks left on gymnasium floors by BMX bikes. His work is characterized by a wry detachment, and in response to a framed grid of 42 discarded lottery scratch cards a reviewer once observed: "...a colourful collage of unwarranted optimism and dashed hopes, is given the title National Lottery scratch cards, or the nihilism and waste of post-modern gambling produces such beautiful pieces of paper. Always a sunny side, clearly." When interviewed by Artfridge in 2016 he noted: "I know a lot of photographers see me as a conceptual artist and a lot of artists see me as a photographer. Personally, I think I’m a photographer. I know too much about cameras!"

== Notable activities ==
In 2013, his extensive archive was exhibited in the Art Projects section of the London Art Fair and in 2014 his work travelled to Ekaterinburg, Russia, for the Decisive Action Festival. From 2013-2016 his work was included in a Gagosian Gallery exhibition entitled 'Ed Ruscha: Books & Co', which toured venues in New York, Paris, Los Angeles, and Munich (at the Museum Brandhorst). Griffin is represented by Hannah Barry Gallery in London, is a member of the ABC Artists' Books Cooperative and currently serves as the creative director of the artist-led project space, Dzialdov in Berlin.

== Collections ==
FRAC Poitou-Charentes, France
