= Swine (Lady Gaga song) =

2013 song by Lady Gaga

Song by Lady Gaga

from the album Artpop
- Released: November 6, 2013
- Studio: Record Plant (Hollywood)
- Genre: EDM; industrial; dubstep
- Length: 4:28
- Label: Streamline; Interscope
- Songwriters: Lady Gaga; Paul "DJ White Shadow" Blair; Dino Zisis; Nick Monson
- Producers: Paul "DJ White Shadow" Blair; Lady Gaga

Audio video
- "Swine" on YouTube

"Swine" is a song by American singer Lady Gaga, recorded for her third studio album, Artpop (2013). She wrote the song with Paul "DJ White Shadow" Blair, Dino Zisis, and Nick Monson; Blair and Gaga served as the song's main producers, with co-production by Monson and Zisis. A dubstep and industrial track, "Swine" was inspired by the singer's sexual experiences and the rage she felt from being raped when she was 19 by an unidentified record producer. Throughout the song, Gaga screams out the lyrics, which talk about denouncing a suitor by comparing them to a pig.

"Swine" was critically appreciated for its harsh composition and craziness. It debuted at number 94 on the Gaon International Digital Chart in South Korea, selling 2,430 copies. In the United States, "Swine" reached a peak position of number 23 on the Billboard Dance/Electronic Songs chart. Gaga performed the song during her iTunes Festival show, the ArtRave: The Artpop Ball tour (2014) and at the South by Southwest (SXSW) music festival in Austin, Texas. The latter performance received criticism for promoting bulimia when artist Millie Brown vomited paint on Gaga onstage. "Swine" was featured in the 2015 documentary The Hunting Ground, along with Gaga's "Til It Happens to You" (2015), which focuses on rape at American universities.

== Background and writing ==
Development of Gaga's third studio album, Artpop, began shortly after the 2011 release of her second record, Born This Way. By the following year, the album's concepts were "beginning to flourish" as Gaga collaborated with producers Fernando Garibay and DJ White Shadow. One of the songs on Artpop was "Swine", which the singer explained was personal, and dealt with challenging and troubling sexual experiences she had encountered in her life.

In December 2014, Gaga revealed on The Howard Stern Show that she was raped at age 19 by a producer twenty years older than her. During her conversation with Stern, the singer recalled, "I went through some horrific things. I'm able to laugh now because I've gone through a lot of mental, physical and emotional therapy [...] I wasn't even willing to admit that anything had even happened [...] I saw him one time in a store, and I was paralyzed by fear." She confirmed that the incident further inspired "Swine", saying, "I wrote a song called 'Swine'; the song is about rape. The song is about demoralization. The song is about rage and fury and passion, and I had a lot of pain that I wanted to release."

== Recording and composition ==
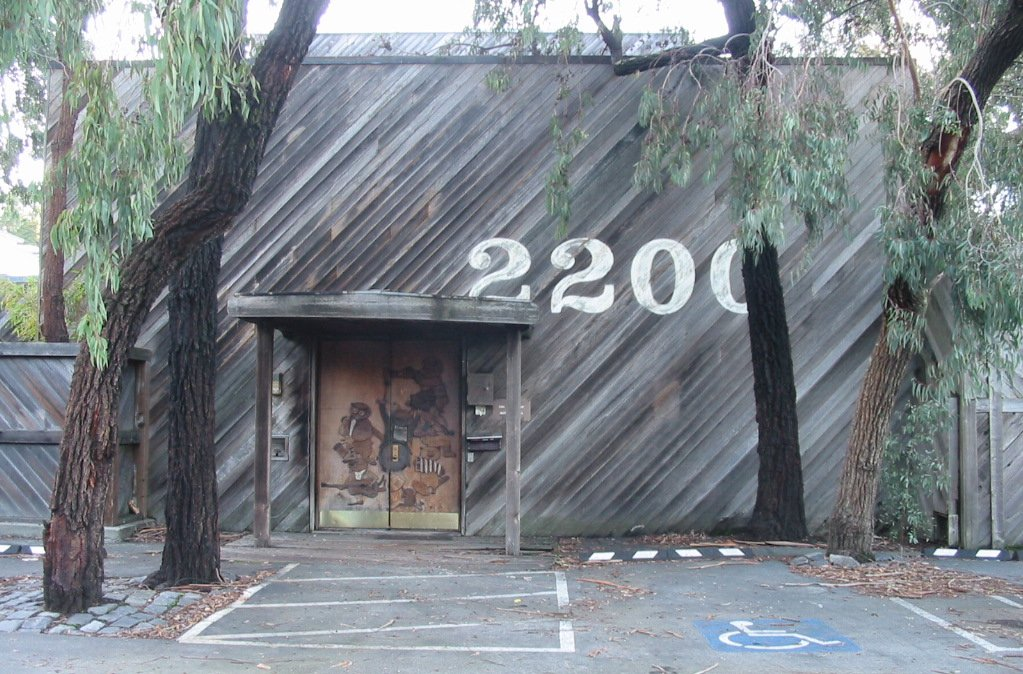
"Swine" was recorded at the Record Plant studio.

Musically, "Swine" is a dubstep and industrial song. Based on the "teaser" of Gaga rehearsing for the iTunes Festival, Entertainment Weekly's Nick Catucci described "Swine" as a "real shocker with Nine Inch Nails lyrics and bull-in-a-bong-shop Deep Purple groove." Consequence of Sound noted the creation of the Twitter hashtag #swinefest, and called the song a "melancholy piano ballad that eventually erupts into a raging pop-rocker, backed by piercing guitar and synths."

Gil Kaufman of MTV News described the track as a "rock-heavy" song. Bradley Stern saw the music as "several hair-raising, teeth-gritting, heart-stopping acid techno-laced beat drops." According to Musicnotes.com, the song is set in the time signature of common time with a fast tempo of 128 beats per minute. It is composed in the key of G minor, with Gaga's harsh vocals ranging from G_{3} to D_{5}. The song has a basic sequence of C/G–Gm–C/G–Gm as its chord progression.

Lyrically, the recording denounces a suitor by comparing them to a pig. Gaga wanted to lessen the harshness of the lyrics developed for the track by making it sound more lighthearted. However, she ended up "screaming and squealing throughout the track." The dance nature of the song vanishes when the chorus is reached, with Gaga belting the lyrics backed by the "chaotic" synths shouting, "You're just a pig inside a human body / Squealer, squealer, squealer, you're so disgusting / You're just a pig inside", finally uttering the word "Swine" continuously as the groove "thrashed".

== Critical reception ==
Kitty Empire of The Guardian praised "Swine" as the album's "wow-factor centrepiece, if not its greatest hit." Kristen S. Hé of Vulture considered the track "perhaps the most violent composition in Lady Gaga's discography", writing that it channels sexual trauma into an intentionally bright pop song while portraying predatory men as swine. Adam White of The Independent described the song as "an enjoyable oddity that burns with disgust", noting how it turns themes of sexual assault and trauma into a club-oriented track while retaining an intentionally uncomfortable tone. Bianca Gracie of Uproxx called "Swine" a "melodic madhouse", praising Gaga for transforming her trauma into an unsettling condemnation of those who exploit others and noting that the song leaves the listener feeling "repulsed and uneasy".

Mike Driver of Clash magazine found Gaga's vocal enunciations comparable to those of singer Christina Aguilera. Maura Johnston of Spin magazine listed the track as one of Artpop's highlights, describing Gaga's belting of the lyrics and the sounds from the keyboards being reminiscent of Trent Reznor's songs. Bradley Stern of MuuMuse called "Swine" the album's most "unhinged moment" where Gaga "let her freak flag fly higher." He also theorized that "Swine" would do well in a live concert. Nicole James of Fuse deemed it "basically the polar opposite of 'Applause'." Jason Lipshutz of Billboard described the track as a "shrieking industrial number" in which Gaga sounds "physically disgusted." Lipshutz said the song was not as "accessible or cleverly penned" as other songs on Artpop, but "as far as detours go, this one's fascinating."

Allison Stewart of The Washington Post was more critical, characterizing "Swine" as a "shuddering, irredeemable rage stroke of a song". Chris Bosman of Consequence of Sound criticized the length of the track, saying that "once the sound of the record has been thoroughly established, many of the songs tend to feel overly long [...] ['Swine'] could easily have chopped a verse and maintained the same effect, with the benefit of brevity."

== Live performances ==
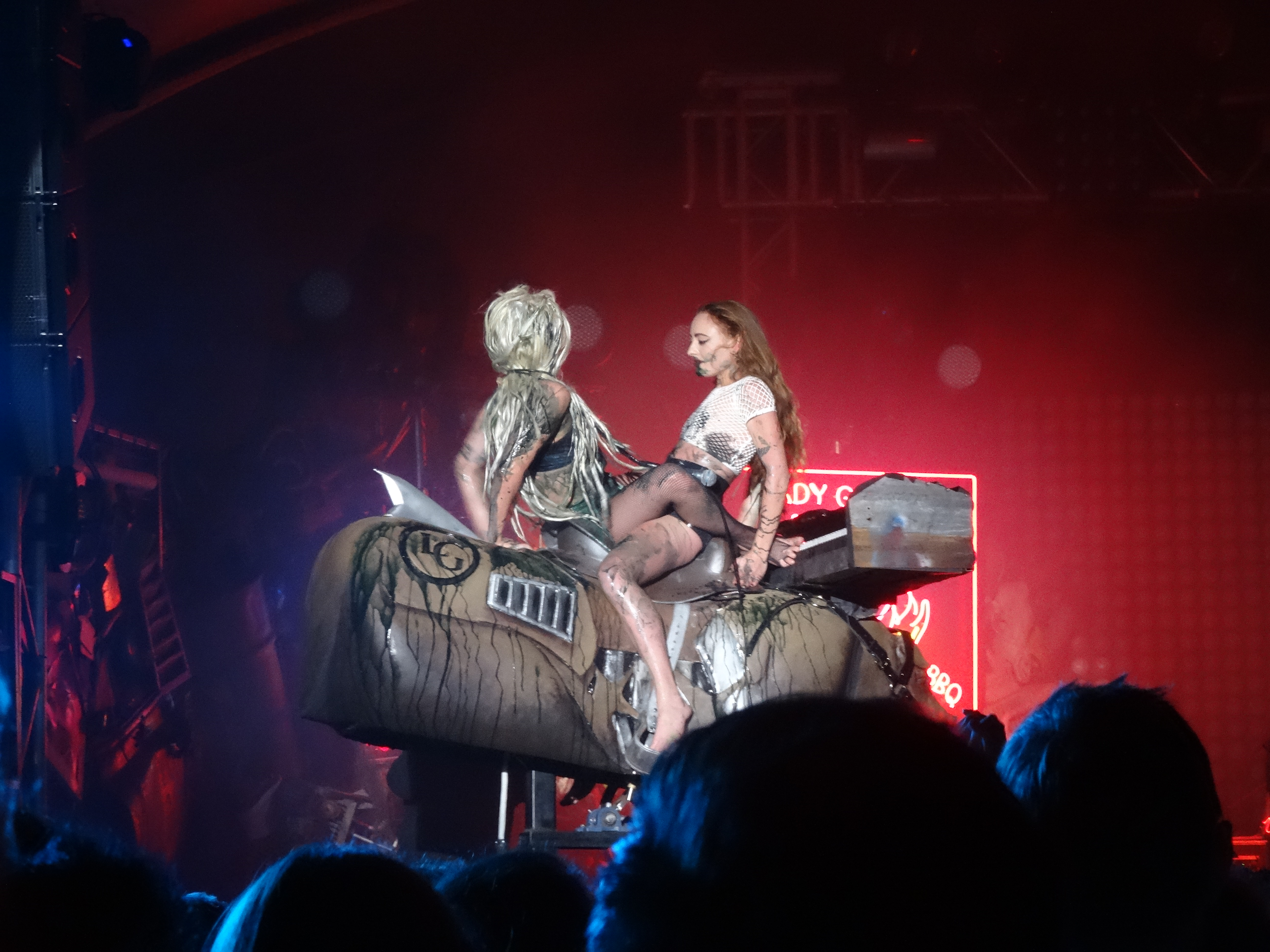
Lady Gaga performing "Swine" with Millie Brown at South by Southwest (SXSW), 2014

In August 2013, Gaga released a one-minute teaser of the song, which showed her rehearsing for the iTunes Festival, along with an image of her performance. Gaga named her gig "SwineFest" after the track, which was a central piece of the show. During the show, she removed her previously worn blonde wig to reveal her natural hair, just before performing the song. She started playing "Swine" on the piano, initially wearing a glittery pig mask, before transitioning into the electronic version of the song. For the second part of the performance, Gaga sat behind a drum kit. During the performance, Gaga's dancers wore pig-like gasmasks and "white boiler suits", and sprayed paint into the crowd from bungee harnesses. Robert Copsey of Digital Spy rated her performance 3.5 on a scale of 5 and said that she "reached the peak of bonkersness".

In March 2014, Gaga introduced "Swine" at the South by Southwest (SXSW) music festival in Austin, Texas as a song about "rape and rage", which was followed by her inviting performance artist Millie Brown to accompany her on stage. During the duo's performance, Brown vomited green-colored liquid onto the stage and Gaga. They then climbed atop a large mechanical bull with a pig's head and a ball gag inserted in its mouth, riding it together and simulating sex acts. Brown continued to vomit on Gaga and her white apron during their time atop the bull. She even inserted her fingers inside Gaga's throat making her regurgitate the black paint all over. A writer for Rolling Stone noted that "[f]or the rest of the show, Gaga would have this black sheen, marking her as a metaphorical survivor of rape and an actual survivor of performance art". In the background was a neon sign with the text, "Lady Gaga's BBQ – Haus of Swine". "Swine" has been called an "anti-rape track" and similarly her SXSW performance was called an "anti-rape demonstration."

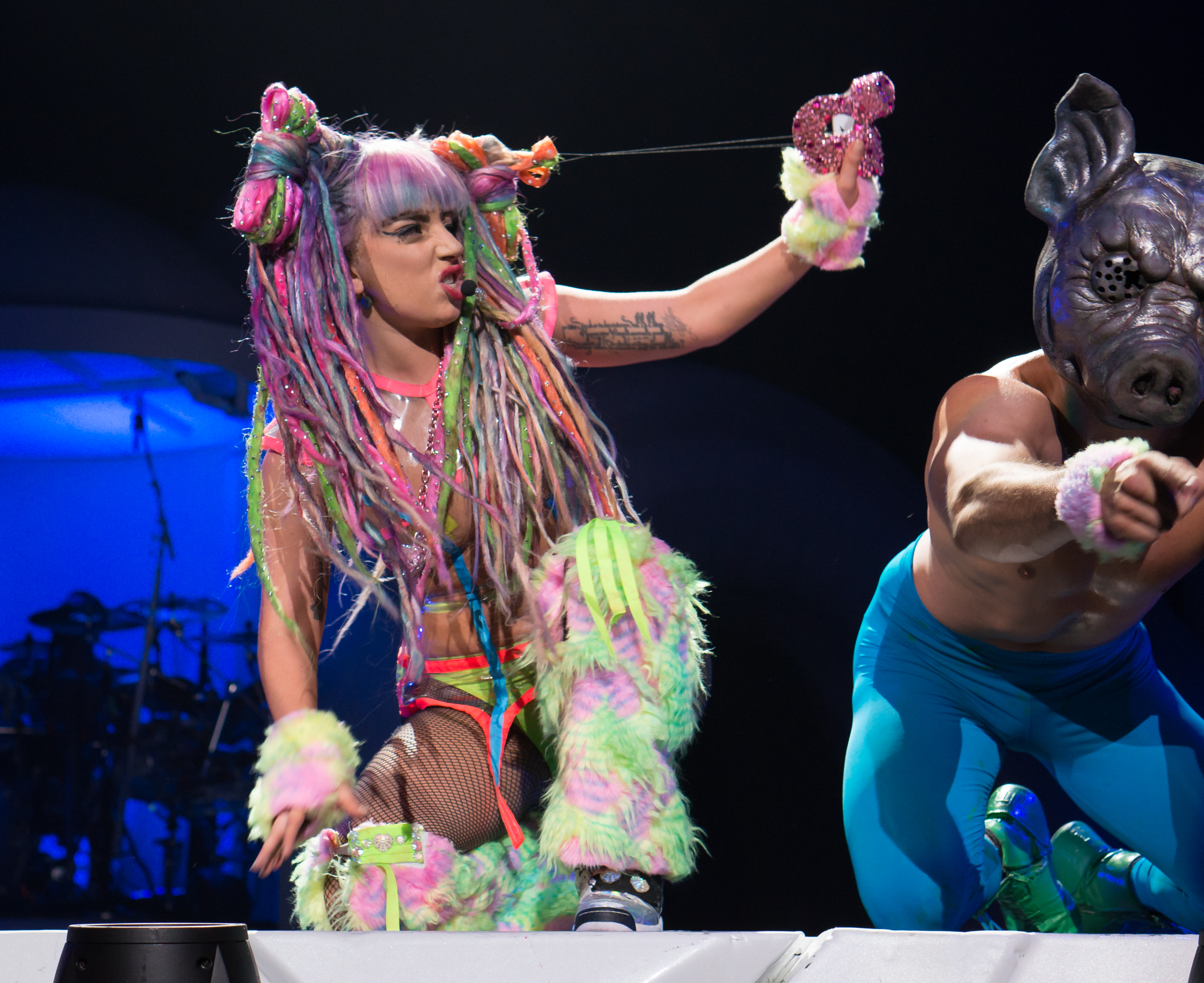
Gaga performing "Swine" at the ArtRave: The Artpop Ball tour

Andrew Hampp felt that "for an album [and concert] inspired by performance art, it was the one moment where music and shock value merged indelibly and credibly." The performance also received criticism for the vomiting act. Recovered bulimic Demi Lovato complained that the show "glamorized" eating disorders. In response to the controversy, Brown told MTV News, "I can understand why people would make that association, but my performance is really not a statement about eating disorders themselves." Gaga confessed on Today, "Millie and I know that not everybody's going to love that performance, but we both really believe in artistic expression and strong identities, and I support her and what she does. Artpop, my new album, is about bringing art and music together in the spirit of creative rebellion, and for us, that performance was art in its purest form." In a 2025 Rolling Stone article, Brian Hiatt compared the SXSW performance to imagery in Gaga's "Disease" music video (2024), in which one of her personas vomits black bile before being embraced by another. He wrote that the scene appeared to recall the "Swine" performance, describing it as a moment when backlash to Artpop crystallized, with debate over "glamorizing bulimia" contributing to perceptions that Gaga's emphasis on spectacle was overshadowing her music.

In 2014, "Swine" was added to the setlist for the whole duration of Gaga's tour, ArtRave: The Artpop Ball, where it was performed as the last song before the encore ("Gypsy"). For the performance, Gaga was dressed as a rave-girl, which was called "a spin on the anime schoolgirl trope". She was wearing multicoloured dreadlocks and fluorescent furry boots. On some occasions, Gaga invited audience members on stage to "rave alongside her". James Duffield from MTV called the performance "a sensory overload – the confetti cannons are back, strobe lights and dancers with pig masks start spewing fake blood from their mouths".

== Credits and personnel ==
Credits adapted from the liner notes of Artpop.

=== Management ===
- Recorded at Record Plant Studios, Hollywood, California
- Mastered at Oasis Mastering Studios, Burbank, California
- Mixed at Mirrorball Studios, North Hollywood, California
- Stefani Germanotta P/K/A Lady Gaga (BMI) Sony ATV Songs LLC/House of Gaga Publishing, LLC/GloJoe Music Inc. (BMI), Maxwell and Carter Publishing, LLC (ASCAP).

=== Personnel ===
- Lady Gaga – songwriter, lead vocals, producer, vocal arrangement
- DJ White Shadow – songwriter, producer
- Dino "Speedlove" Zisis – songwriter, co-producer
- Nick Monson – songwriter, co-producer, mixing
- Dave Russell – recording
- Daniel Zaidenstadt – additional recording
- Benjamin Rice – recording assistant
- Tony Masterati – mixing
- Jon Castelli – mixing engineering
- Justin Hergett – mixing assistant
- Rick Pearl – additional programming
- Nicole Ganther – background vocals
- Natalie Ganther – background vocals
- Lyon Gray – background vocals
- Ivy Skoff – union contract administrator
- Gene Grimaldi – mastering

== Charts ==
Weekly chart performance for "Swine"
Chart (2013)	Peak position
South Korea International (Gaon)	94
US Hot Dance/Electronic Songs (Billboard)	23
