= ArtRave: The Artpop Ball =

2014 concert tour by Lady Gaga

- World tour by Lady Gaga
- Promotional poster
- Location: Asia; Europe; North America; Oceania
- Associated album: Artpop
- Start date: May 4, 2014
- End date: November 24, 2014
- Legs: 5
- No. of shows: 79
- Supporting acts: Lady Starlight; Hatsune Miku; Crayon Pop; Babymetal; Momoiro Clover Z
- Box office: $81 million ($110.16 million in 2025 dollars)

Lady Gaga concert chronology
- Lady Gaga Live at Roseland Ballroom (2014); ArtRave: The Artpop Ball (2014); Cheek to Cheek Tour (2014–2015)

ArtRave: The Artpop Ball (stylized as artRAVE: the ARTPOP ball) was the fourth headlining concert tour by American singer Lady Gaga. Supporting her third studio album Artpop (2013), the tour ran from May 4 to November 24, 2014. The tour dates included cities where Gaga had canceled shows of her previous Born This Way Ball tour after suffering a hip injury. The ArtRave tour was preceded by a seven-day residency at the Roseland Ballroom in Manhattan, New York.

ArtRave's concept and name are derived from the similarly named release party for Artpop. The stage resembled a cave and consisted of two sections connected by catwalks made of translucent lucite, allowing the audience to move underneath the catwalks while still being able to watch the show. Gaga's costumes in the show included one with tentacles, one with bejeweled wings, a rave-inspired outfit and a necklace made of marijuana leaves. Costume designers and choreographers aspired to make a single, coherent show. The lighting fixtures used for the concert were from Clay Paky and the main idea was to create an immersive rave experience with the lights. They were also designed to accommodate minor changes in the show sequences. The tour received positive response from reviewers, but some criticized it for being disjointed.

ArtRave: The Artpop Ball was produced by Live Nation, and promoted by Absolut Vodka in the United States and O_{2} in the United Kingdom. Tickets for several shows sold out immediately once available, prompting additional dates. Negative reports about the tour's commercial performance were dismissed by Live Nation chairman Arthur Fogel. Gaga repeatedly placed within the top-ten of the Billboard Boxscore lists for the 2014 tour grosses. At the end, ArtRave: The Artpop Ball grossed a total of $81 million from an attendance of over 999,000. Billboard also listed it as the ninth best concert tour of the year with 76 reported shows. On November 24, 2014, the concert was streamed live from Bercy Arena in France.

== Background ==
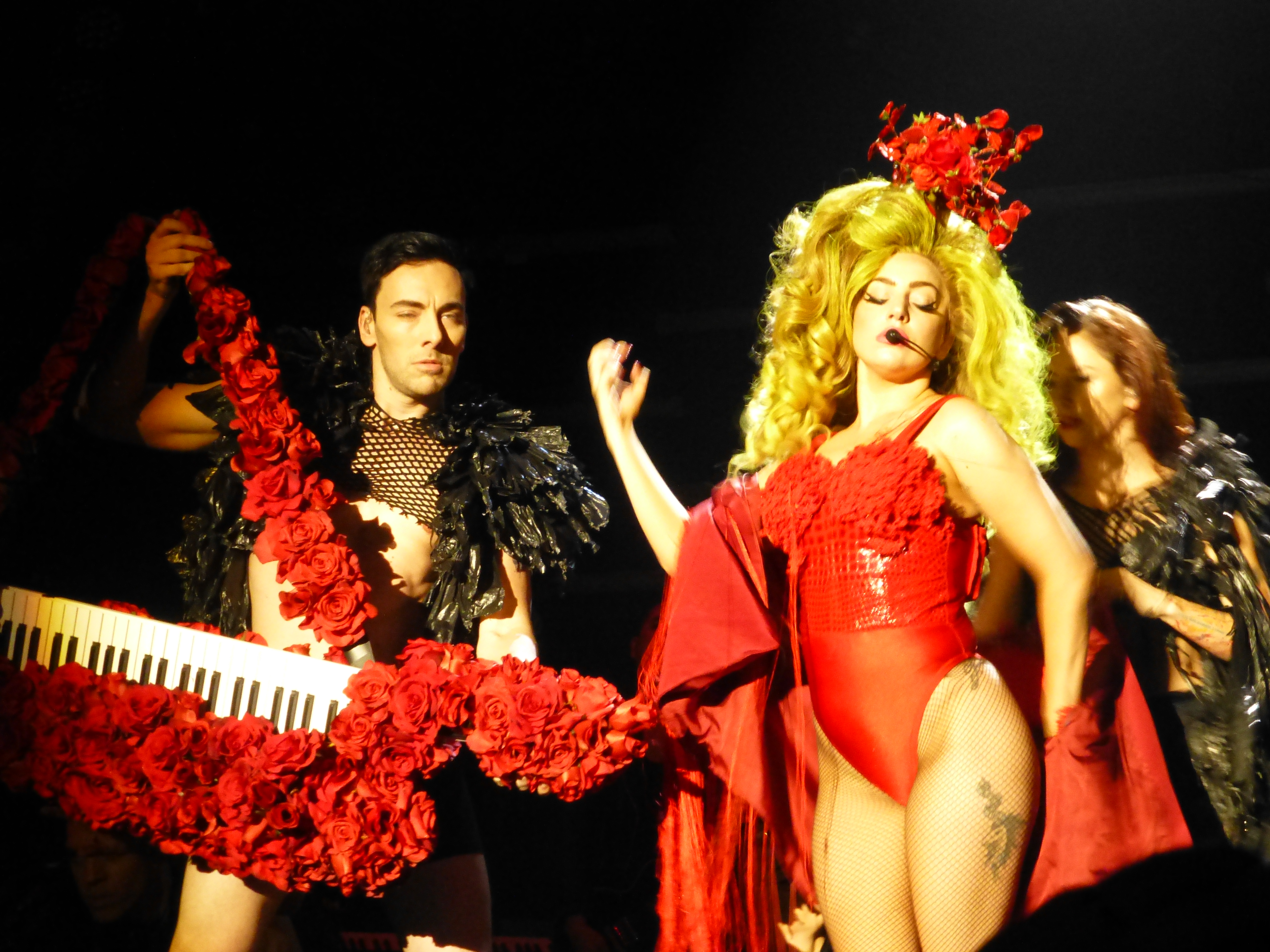
Gaga performing during her residency show at Roseland Ballroom, March 2014

While releasing her third studio album Artpop, Gaga held a private event in New York known as ArtRave, where she performed songs from the album and showcased art pieces. Later, she took the concept of ArtRave and created ArtRave: The Artpop Ball tour. After abruptly cancelling the North American leg of her previous Born This Way Ball (2012–13) tour due to a major hip injury, the tour began with its first leg in the United States on May 4, 2014, in Sunrise, Florida. (Note: Promoted as Ft. Lauderdale) ArtRave: The Artpop Ball had the singer visiting cities where she canceled tour dates in order to undergo the surgery, as well as playing new cities. Gaga explained to The Independent: "When I'm onstage with the Artpop Ball, the point of the show is to take what was the mess of my life and make art of it – to raise the spirit of artistic dreams and creativity and take all the things I was feeling in pain about, and rage... I take a much more meditative approach to the performance. I've got wide-open ears. The ArtRave has routines, and there's a performance-art aspect that has been designed." Prior to the beginning of the tour, Gaga headlined six shows (March 28, 30, 31 and April 2, 4, and 6) at the Roseland Ballroom in Manhattan, New York, and these shows were the final performances at the venue. A seventh show was also added for April 7 and officially closed the venue.

Gaga also held a one-off concert for ArtRave: The Artpop Ball inside a six-storey vending machine at Doritos' annual South by Southwest (SXSW) music festival at Austin, Texas. The city's Music and Entertainment division had initially denied permission to Gaga for playing inside the venue citing that it was for "public safety concerns". Don Pitts from the division said that the venue being in close proximity with a parking lot was the reason they had to cancel Gaga's application. On March 6, 2014, it was announced that Gaga would indeed play at the venue. Tickets were sold to the fans through different competitions and challenges. Randal Lane from Forbes reported that the concert would support Gaga's Born This Way Foundation and charity events, but nevertheless opined that "the way they're doling out the tickets is still crass". The concert was criticized when artist Millie Brown vomited a green liquid over Gaga during the performance of "Swine" from Artpop. The performance received complaints about "glamorizing" eating disorders. In response to the controversy, Brown told MTV News: "I can understand why people would make that association, but my performance is really not a statement about eating disorders themselves." Gaga herself told Today "Millie and I know that not everybody's going to love that performance, but we both really believe in artistic expression and strong identities, and I support her and what she does. Artpop, my new album, is about bringing art and music together in the spirit of creative rebellion, and for us, that performance was art in its purest form."

== Development ==
=== Stage setup ===
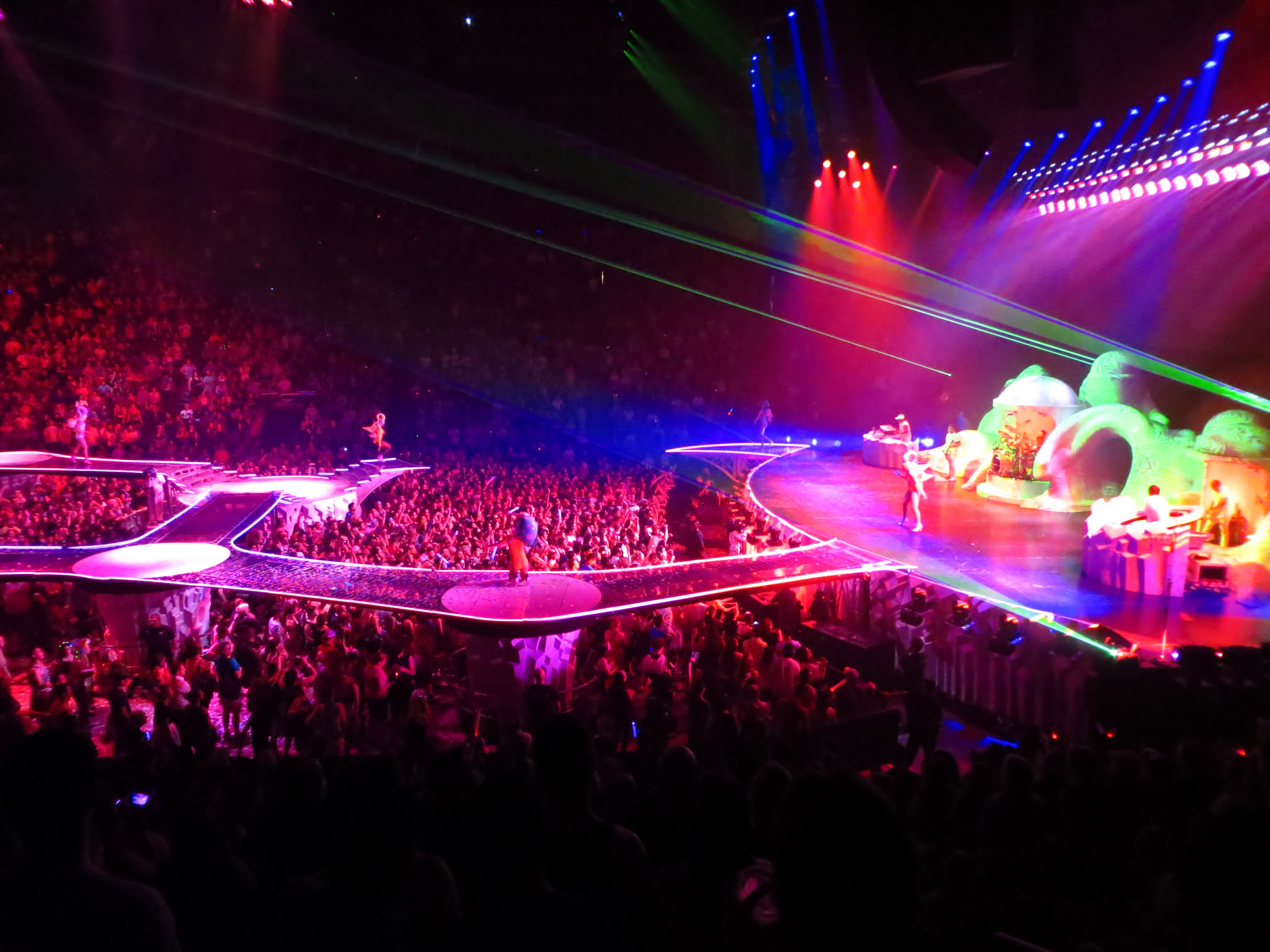
The tour stage showing the catwalks protruding into the audience

For the tour, Gaga told Capital FM that she wanted something other than the "Monster Pit" arrangement she previously had in the Born This Way Ball tour, since she was always limited to performing on one portion of the arena. Hence Gaga and her team thought of building two stages, one main stage and an accompanying one on the far end of the arena. It would be enhanced by the addition of a catwalk which would wind all around the arena floor, enabling the singer to interact with the audience. In March 2014, Gaga tweeted a picture of the stage which showed a runway extending from the main platform up to the general admission seats and then bifurcating into two additional runways, ending in small stages within the audience. At the end of the first runway, another platform was constructed which descended into the crowd directly. Gaga noted that the 110 feet (34 m) long runways would be made of lucite rendering them translucent, so that the crowd can dance underneath it while still being able to watch the show. The main stage was described as a white cave, reminiscent of Atlantica from the 1989 Disney film The Little Mermaid, and featured a digital backdrop showing stars and the moon.

The band was placed inside the white dome like structures on the stage, described by John Jurgenson from The Wall Street Journal as like the planet Tatooine in the Star Wars series. At the end of one of the Lucite runways, a piano was hidden beneath enormous stalagmite-like structures reminiscent of Superman's Fortress of Solitude in the comics. There was also a bar overlooking the piano area, where the audience could order drinks while watching the show. Following the reveal of the image, the hashtag #LadyGagaTourStage started trending globally in Twitter. According to Stacy Lambe from Out magazine, the stage took over 21,000 hours to construct, including the catwalks. There are 15 inflatable trees which are air hosed on the stage to re-create a garden during one of the segments. The whole set up took three hours to dismantle and 21 trucks to carry it from one venue to another. Production manager Jason "JD" Danter explained that the whole set up started from 8:00 am, with lighting and sound checks taking six hours to complete.

For the production of the show, Gaga enlisted choreographer Richard Jackson and together with him and her creative team, the Haus of Gaga, they came up with ideas regarding how the show should be constructed and what music should be performed. They also had to find a way to co-mingle all the different ideas to make a single, coherent show. For the choreography, which encompassed all the stages present, Jackson had to employ a different approach, so that the audience could see the performance from every angle.

=== Costume design ===
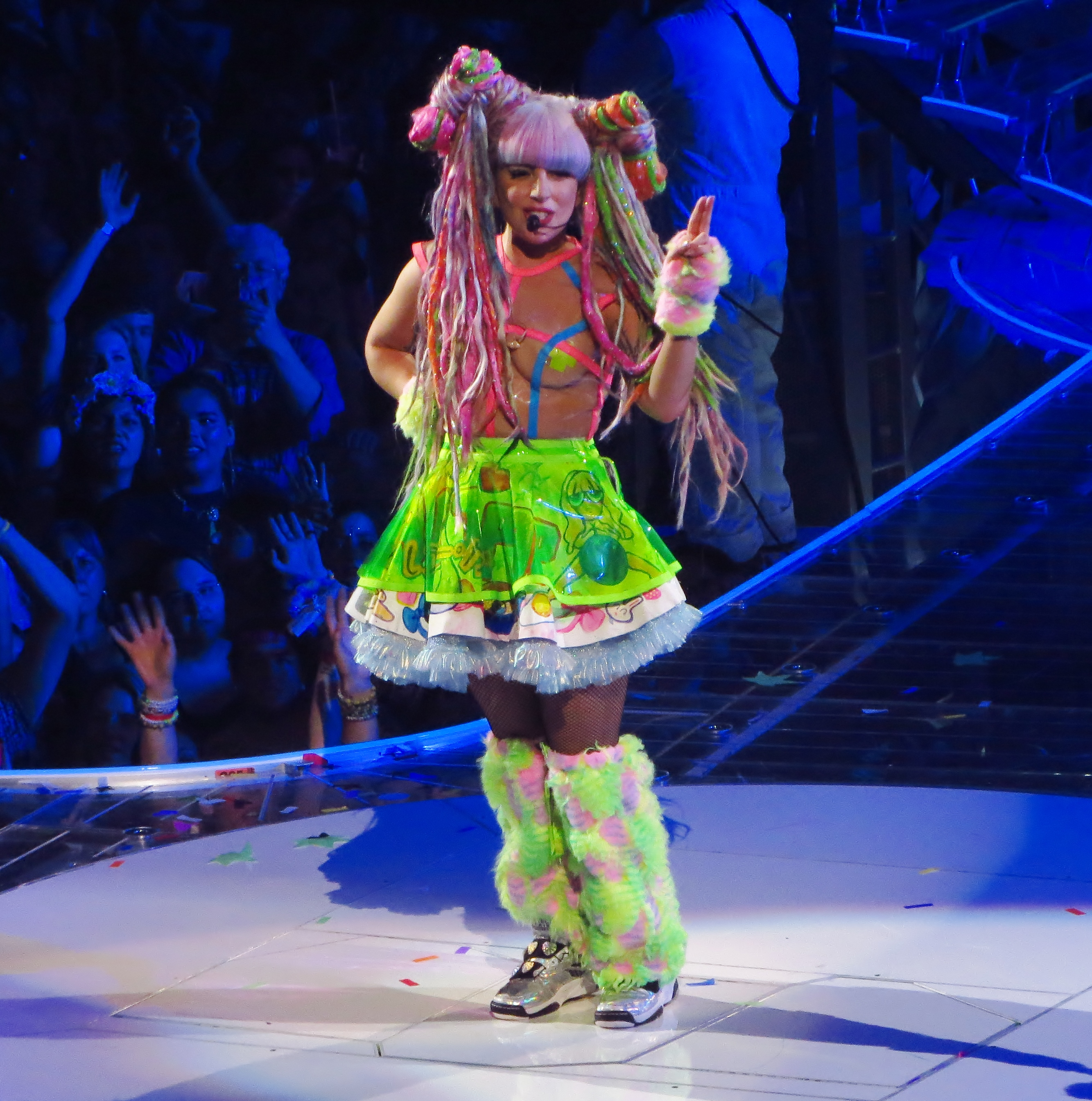
Gaga in the rave girl inspired dress worn during the last segment

Gaga did not preview the costumes for the tour until the opening night. There were seven outfits created for the show, all throughout the different segments. The first was a bejeweled leotard which had the Jeff Koons blue gazing ball attached in the middle; the ball was previously used in the album cover art for Artpop. Gaga accessorized the dress with a pair of feathered wings while wearing a blond bob wig reminiscent of her looks from The Fame era. A rave inspired outfit was worn for the last segment and consisted of colorful dreadlocks and legwarmers made of fur. She added a shirt consisting of straps and plastic sleeves with it. One of the complex outfits was made of latex and consisted of a polka dotted leotard and a number of tentacles attached to the dress as well as a headpiece with two tentacles from it.

The singer also wore a short dress coupled with a platinum bob wig; another version of the dress had a gown attached to it, with Gaga wearing a long wig inspired by Donatella Versace. Before the final performance Gaga wore black latex pants and a top, with a green wig on her head and a necklace made of marijuana leaves. Finally, Gaga also wore a seashell bikini top and voluminous wig; the ensemble had been worn by Gaga in previous live performances for the Artpop era. Her dancers wore neon colored outfits with matching head gears and accessories. Gaga also had a number of unique props, including a Gibson Flying V guitar during "Venus", a plastic chair shaped like a claw and a keytar which was shaped like a sea horse.

BBC News reported that some of the costumes for the tour were designed by Sunderland University fashion graduate Dayne Henderson. He had been chosen by one of Gaga's stylists after seeing his tweet to the singer with a photo of his design which included clothing inspired by fetish fashion. Henderson developed hoods, masks and head pieces for Gaga and her dancers. He had to produce the clothes in latex, and within 12 days had to deliver it to Gaga's management.

=== Lighting fixtures ===
Production and lighting designer Roy Bennett used Clay Paky's A.leda B-Eye K20 LED-based moving lights and Clay Paky Sharpys as lighting attachments. Also around 120 B-Eyes by PKG, were obtained for the tour as well with lighting control from three full-sized grandMA2s and 10 NPUs. According to lighting programmer Jason Baeri, "Bennett's approach to the show was to make it an immersive rave that reflected Gaga's non-stop party aesthetic... That means active, alive, vibrant and high energy—it requires us to be just as active on stage as in the crowd. The audience is every bit as much a set piece as they are a room of spectators, so we had to include them as part of Gaga's same party not just watching the spectacle from afar. Cue wise, that's almost like programming two shows at once: Both had to behave as one cohesive element."

Bennett had started designing the lighting from November 2013 and three months later presented it to Gaga. She approved off the audience experience theme that Bennett developed. The B-Eyes, which were previously used in the Roseland shows, were mounted above the 3 by 40 feet (0.91 m × 12 m) video screens in the tour. Sharpy rigging were used throughout, in the front of the stage, rear, side, as well as on the pods over the audience. They were the main lighting accessory for the tour. Baeri explained that they had faced technical challenges, due to high pixel content. The B-Eyes added a total of 4,500 pixel and was varied through all possible configurations. The lighting effects varied along with the tone and the inflections of the song being performed. Clay Paky was distributed by A.C.T Lighting in North America. Solotech were signed as the video contractor, while 8th Day Sound group were the audio contractors throughout the tour.

== Concert synopsis ==
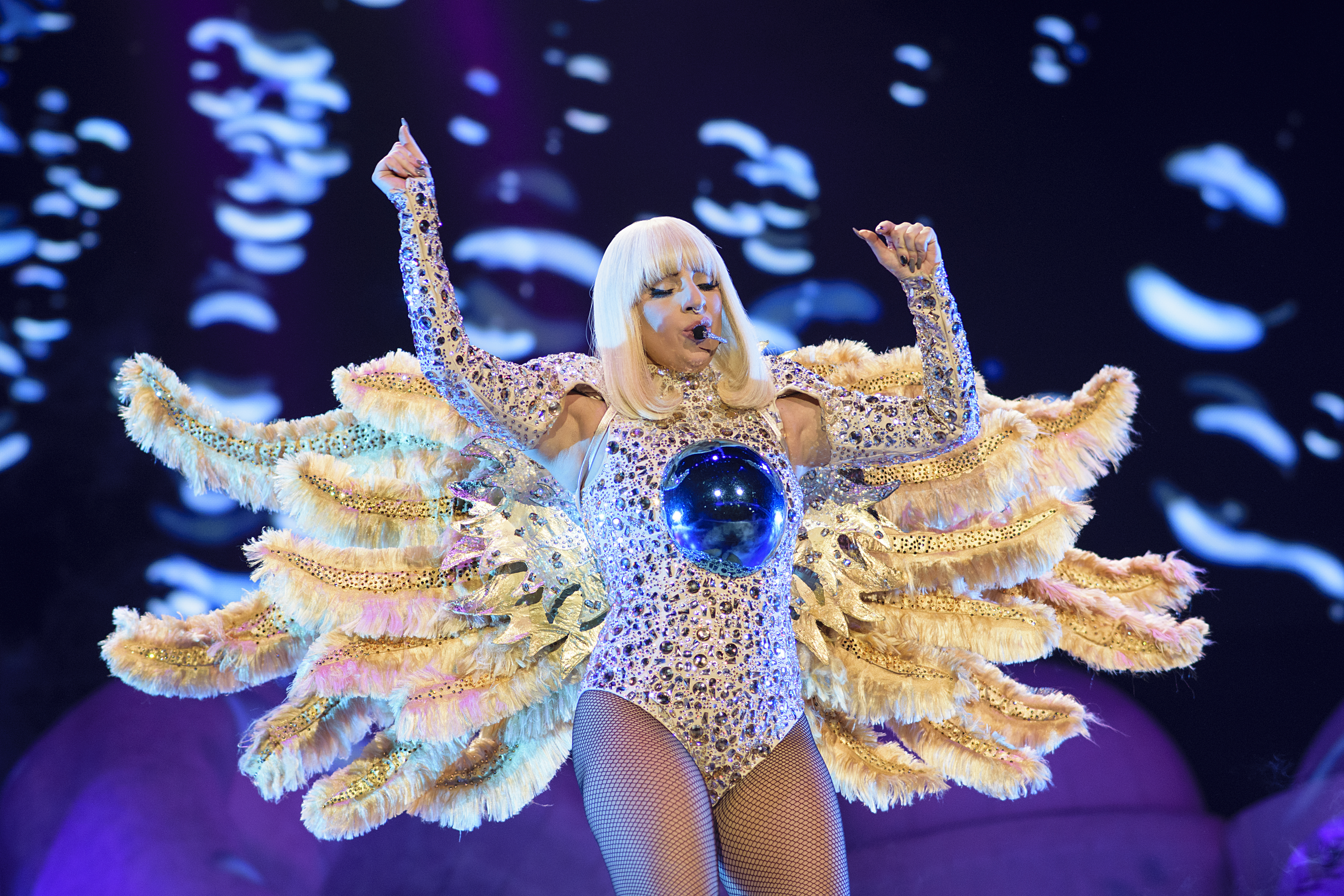
Gaga beginning the show with a performance of the track, "Artpop"

The show starts off with a video introduction about the tour, followed by dancers appearing on stage with balloons and blue gazing balls. The video continues to play as Gaga emerges from beneath the stage, wearing a golden leotard with wings. She proceeds to sing "Artpop" and then "G.U.Y.", the latter having choreography from its music video. The song transitions to "Donatella" with the screen showing flashing stars and colorful cloud formations. Gaga then performs "Fashion!" on the piano and goes back for a costume change as the band plays the remaining part of the song.

The next section starts with "Venus" as large inflatable flowers rise from below on stage. Gaga appears in the seashell bikini ensemble and playing a guitar. After a welcome speech, "MANiCURE" and "Cake Like Lady Gaga" are performed. Gaga disappears inside for another outfit change as the band plays an outro. She emerges back onto stage in the white outfit and wig as a video shows her twirling on screen. "Just Dance" is sung, with Gaga using a seahorse-shaped keytar and her dancers dressed as "sea people". It is followed by a medley of "Poker Face" and "Telephone". The act ends with Gaga exiting for a costume change and "Partynauseous" is played as an interlude.

The fourth act begins with Gaga wearing the tentacle dress and singing "Paparazzi". She then removes the tentacles and sits on a hand-shaped chair, performing "Do What U Want", followed by Gaga singing "Dope" and "You and I" on piano. Later, Gaga invites a fan onstage and sings a piano version of "Born This Way". She and the fan exit through a trap down as "Jewels n' Drugs" is played as an interlude.

As dancers move props and cannons around the stage, Gaga changes a black latex dress and green wig. She returns to stage and sings a medley of "The Edge of Glory", "Judas", and "Aura", beginning the fifth act. A red couch is brought out on which "Sexxx Dreams" is sung. Following this, white chairs are brought out onto the stage by the dancers for "Mary Jane Holland", during which a choreography is shown with the chairs. "Alejandro" takes place on the lucite runways. At the end of the song, Gaga descends for a quick change. The fifth act triggers when she arises in a Cher-like outfit, singing "Bang Bang (My Baby Shot Me Down)". Gaga then performs "Bad Romance" in a rave-inspired costume, followed by "Applause", during which a video backdrop shows the singer in various disguises. Gaga bids the audience goodbye and sings "Swine", during which her dancers fire stuffed animals into the crowd using cannon. During the performance, Gaga removes her wig and dances with shirtless men in pig masks. She leaves the stage for a final costume change, appearing to perform "Gypsy" for the encore. Near the end, she crosses to the main stage and exits with her dancers and band.

== Commercial performance ==
=== Ticket sales ===
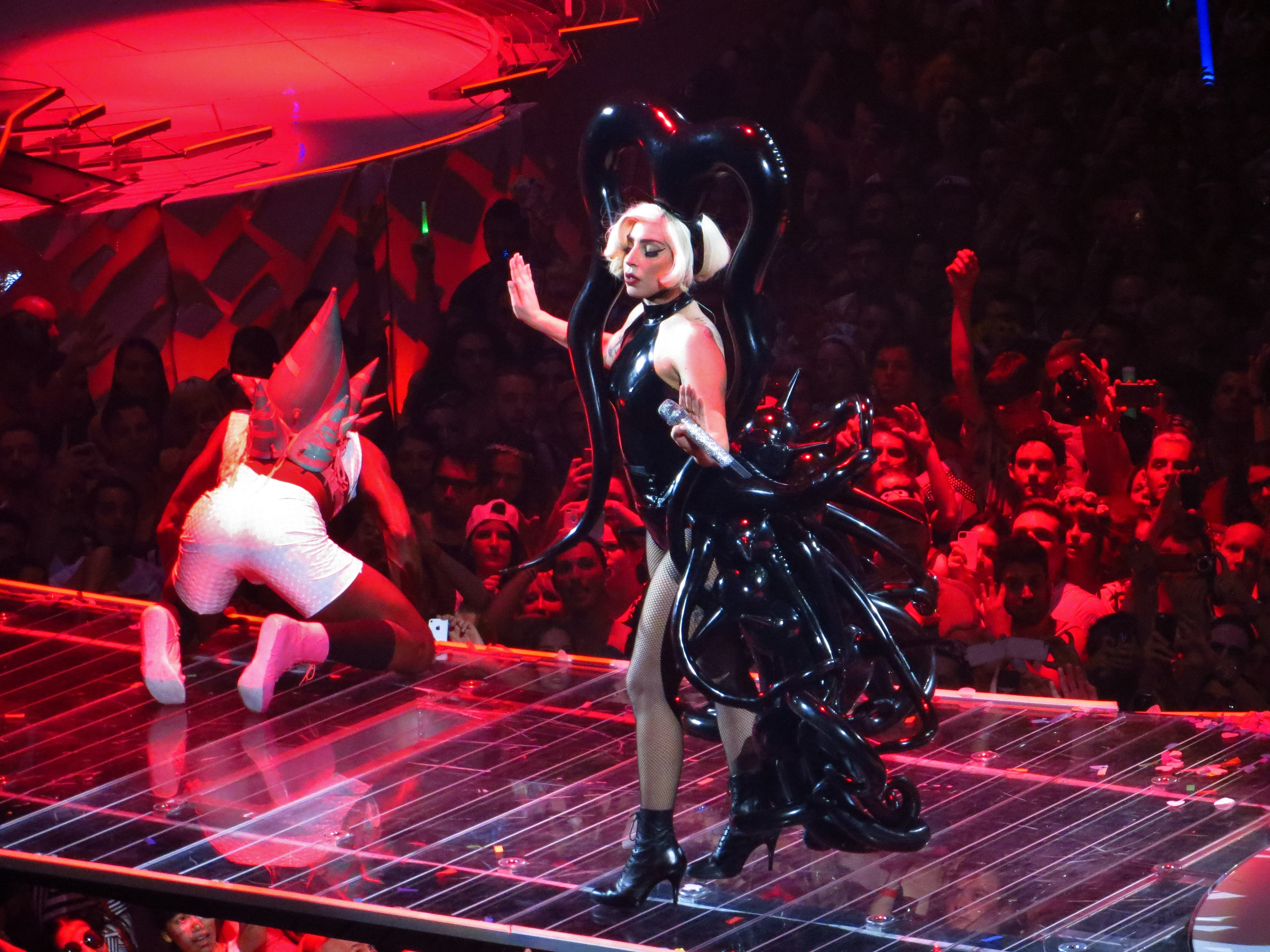
Gaga performing "Paparazzi", wearing the tentacle dress

The tickets were first available to members of Gaga's social network website, Littlemonsters.com. They were provided with a unique code for ordering tickets from online, but were limited to four tickets per member. According to Live Nation, the first batch of tickets for the tour went on sale from December 9, 2013, and sell-out shows were reported from Toronto, Winnipeg, Calgary, Los Angeles and Edmonton within hours. This led to two new dates being added to the itinerary: June 26 at Milwaukee's Marcus Amphitheater, and June 28 at Atlantic City's Boardwalk Hall. On January 29, 2014, Gaga released the dates for the European leg of the tour, which would begin September 23, 2014, from Belgium. The singer partnered with British mobile network O_{2}, for a deal which would enable the company's customers to avail tickets for the tour three days prior to the general release. The deal included Gaga being featured in a new advertisement, for promoting the UK leg of the tour and showed her wearing a dress with large, glittering shoulder pads while running towards a concert stage. This was the second time Gaga partnered with O_{2}, first in November 2013, for exclusive access to the tracks from Artpop, ahead of its UK release. Upon release, Ticketmaster reported that the UK venues sold out within five minutes, prompting the singer to add another two dates in London. In April and May 2014, she released more floor tickets for sale, after ensuring larger crowd capacity for all the UK venues and a total of eight new dates.

For the US dates, Gaga partnered with Absolut Vodka, who transformed the bar adjacent to the stage into a lounge called "Absolut Artpop Lounge", where some of the lucky fans could watch the show, while ordering cocktails of their choice. Two fans would be chosen on the spot to have seats at the bar; tickets could also be won through a contest at the Absolut website. Gaga explained that with the help of Absolut she could "[create] a special experience where fans can actually sit inside the stage and have their own bar. It's going to be a huge rave in the spirit of art and creativity." Other promotions announced at the website included winning an all-expense-paid trip to see Gaga's show on September 30 at Stockholm, Sweden, and Gaga-inspired runway shows at gay bars across the nation, from where another set of tickets could be won. Four dates were added in Australia, starting from August 20, 2014, at Perth. She had one concert at Dubai's Meydan Racecourse on September 10, but newspaper Gulf News reported that the show would be censored for respecting cultural traditions in the UAE. According to Marco Riois, chairman of AMI Live which organized the show in Dubai, "there will be some edits... It cannot be the full show, because it wouldn't be allowed. So it's a special show for Dubai and for the culture".

=== Boxscore ===
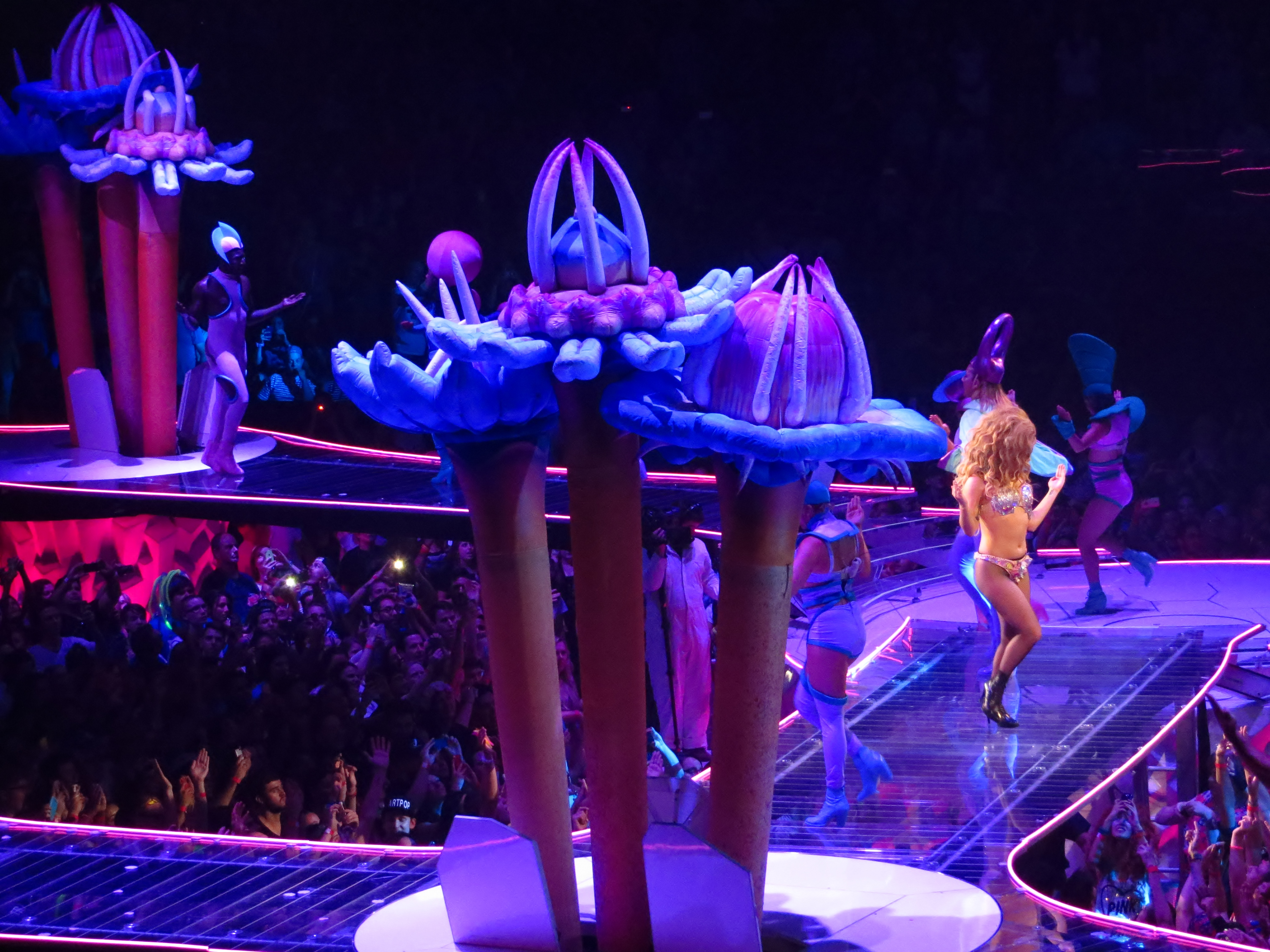
During the performance of "Venus", large flowers cropped up on the stage

Forbes spoke about the commendable ticket pricing ensued by Live Nation for the tour. Jesse Lawrence from the magazine noticed how the ticket prices were lowered to an average of $68 in Gaga's primary markets and ensuing fast sell-outs, compared to those of her contemporaries, like Miley Cyrus' Bangerz Tour which had an average ticket price at $86. Conversely, the average price was raised to as high as $269 in Gaga's secondary markets, although with fewer tickets available than Cyrus' tour. This again ensued that the revenue was earned with profit. Lawrence concluded by saying that "Lady Gaga's pricing, seems to be taking a longer-term view and is focused on providing access to as many of her fans as possible as opposed to wringing out every last dollar on the current tour." In April 2014, Lawrence reported that following Gaga's performance at Roseland Ballroom, the tour ticket prices in the secondary markets went up by 5.3%, with major increases being visible at Philips Arena in Atlanta. Tickets at Madison Square Garden rose up to $338.81, which was 42.6% higher than the average price. Other locations where ticket prices saw an increase were MGM Grand Garden Arena in Paradise, (Note: Promoted as Las Vegas) TD Garden in Boston and United Center in Chicago. A higher price was set for the first of two nights at Staples Center in Los Angeles, resulting in one of the costliest tickets in the show. The pricing was leveled off for the second night and they gradually decreased with the tour's progress. This was evident in the tour date switch up between May 12 and 15 at Washington and Philadelphia, respectively, where the ticket prices fell by 29.5%.

Reports arose in the media that the ticket sales for the tour were falling, leading Arthur Fogel, Chairman of Live Nation's Global Touring division, to brand them as "ridiculous". He clarified to Billboard that the about 80% of the tickets were sold in North America and Europe, and they were still in the process of releasing future dates for numerous venues. The 29 shows in North America had grossed around US$26 million, with an average of almost $900,000 per show. Fogel also addressed concerns that Live Nation had lost $30 million from Gaga's tour, saying that if a similar situation really happened, then the company would have cancelled the concerts. "I just don't know how this shit gets any traction without people doing their homework... Just a complete fool would say something like that and it could only come from somebody who has an agenda, because it makes absolutely no sense, on any level", Fogel concluded. A total of 800,000 tickets have been sold for the tour, as reported by Billboard.

In June 2014, Billboard released the first boxscore figures for the tour, up to the June 2 date. Gaga placed at number four on the boxscore list with total gross of $13.9 million, and more than 171,000 tickets sold. The boxscore figure for her Roseland Ballroom performance was also revealed to have grossed $1.5 million with more than 24,000 tickets sold. In October 2014, the second set of boxscore were released, with sales of 509,741 tickets and a gross of $46,933,594, ranking at number two on the boxscore list. Final boxscores were released in December 2014, with the last performance at Paris' Palais Omnisports Bercy grossing $1.2 million and audience of 13,013. In total, ArtRave: The Artpop Ball grossed $83 million from 920,088 sold tickets at the 74 reported performances to Billboard Boxscore. On Pollstar's Year-end Top 20 Worldwide Tours list, Gaga ranked at number seven with $88.7 million in gross and 947,852 tickets sold for 84 shows, including the seven shows from Roseland Ballroom. Billboard listed it as the ninth best concert tour of the year with 76 reported shows.

== Critical response ==
=== North America ===
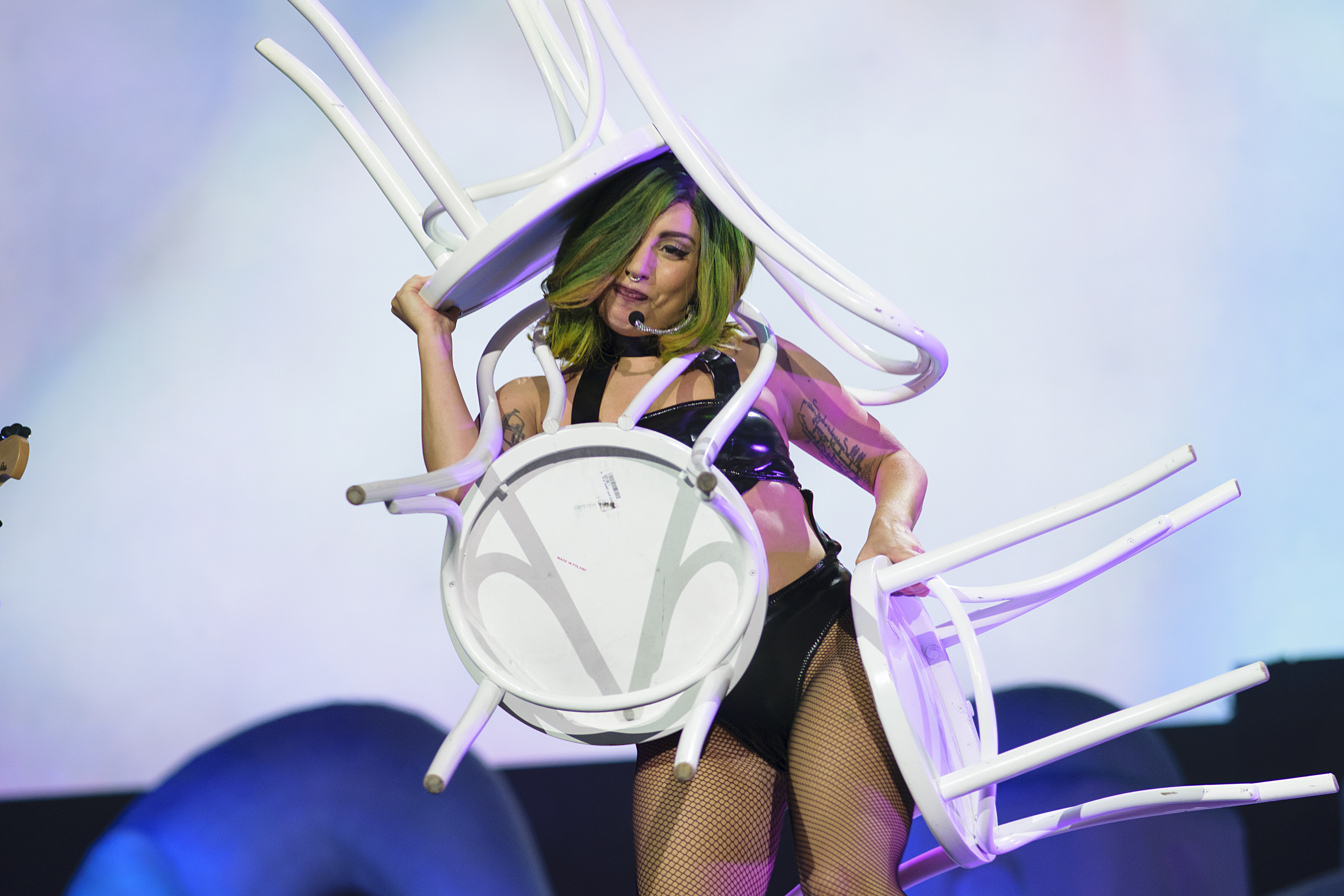
Gaga performing "Mary Jane Holland" in a green wig, covering herself with a set of chairs

John Walker from MTV News reviewed the opening concert in Sunrise, and was impressed with the show. He particularly liked the segment, when after the performance of "Alejandro", Gaga decided to change her costume onstage and did so with the help of her stylists. Walker added that "to prove this, [Gaga] ripped the green, shoulder-length wig right off of her head. Yes, she literally snatched her own wig. Reverse Warholian expedition says what?" Walker further emphasized in another review for MTV that the tour expanded on Gaga's characteristic "fan-to-artist" connections and theatrics she had developed with the Born This Way Ball. Adam Carlson from Billboard praised the show saying that it turned the "spectacle" into a "surprise". He complimented the choreography and the constant costume changes, explaining that "talking about [Gaga's] performances is more fun than listening to them, but don't take that as an insult. There's just a lot to talk about." Chris Richards from The Washington Post said that "for a pop concert in an arena [Verizon Center], it felt good. As a public exercise in reciprocal, unconditional love, it felt unique [from Gaga]."

Glenn Gamboa from Newsday was impressed with the performances, saying "Whether it was the goofiness of 'Venus', the playfulness of 'Donatella' or the throwback soul of 'Do What U Want', which she crowned with an a cappella bit of gospel, she filled the songs with an intensity that was infectious." Lauren Moraski from CBS News felt that Gaga was in "full-force" during the concert and "seemed right at home" with the New York crowd. Frank Scheck from The Hollywood Reporter commended the stage setup, the costumes and the overall entertainment aspect of the tour, saying that "Unlike Madonna, who engages in similar, but decidedly chillier, over-the-top theatrics, Gaga invests her spectacles with an undeniable sweetness and heart." Scheck was positive about the performances of "Gypsy" and "Born This Way".

Negative commentary came from Rob Sheffield of Rolling Stone who reviewed the show at Madison Square Garden and was disappointed, calling it "a run-of-the-mill arena-rock show, the kind where a band has a shoddy new album to flog". He was not impressed that Gaga chose to ignore songs from Born This Way and its successful singles. Dan DeLuca from Philadelphia Daily News wrote that "the show was seriously marred by too many electro powered would-be dance cuts from ARTPOP whose weaknesses were exposed whenever she reached back to her more enticing greatest hits" and that she performed "far too many songs" from Artpop. The Boston Globe writer James Reed felt that "something" was missing from Gaga's performance, and it felt "hollow". He also criticized Gaga's reliance on backing tracks to sing her songs. Joey Guerra from Houston Chronicle found the show to be "disjointed", saying that there was "little in the way of real transition between sequences, particularly in the later moments."

=== Oceania, Asia, and Europe ===
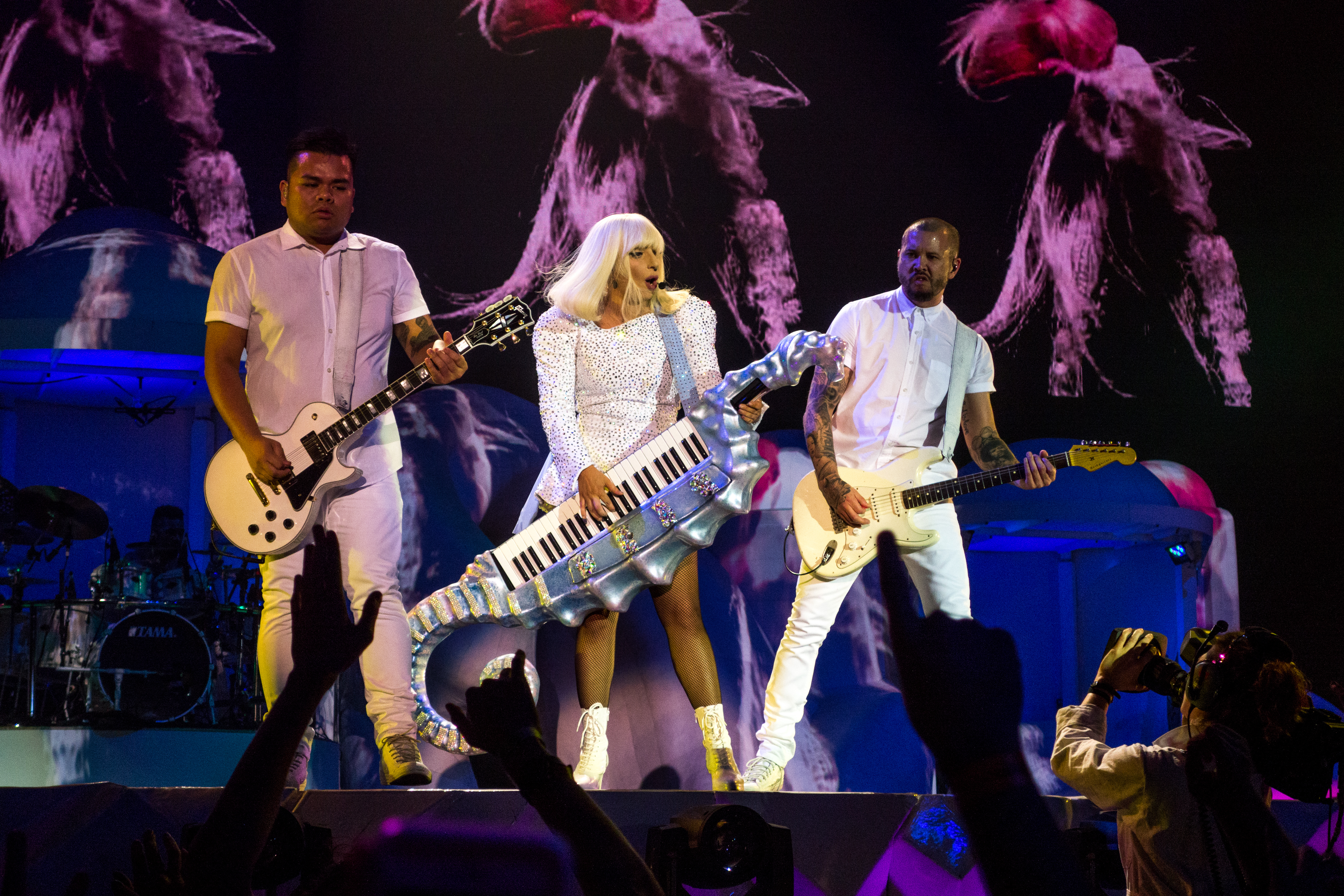
Gaga playing on a seahorse-shaped keytar while performing "Just Dance"

Candice Barnes from The Sydney Morning Herald gave the show positive review, saying that Gaga "delivered a show fit for a queen" at Perth Arena. "Plugged as an 'art rave', it was hard to distinguish where the art finished and the music began", she concluded. Conversely, Ross McCrae from The West Australian panned the show calling it "middle of the road arena rock show", and noticed the public's lack of interest in the performances. The lack of ticket sales was also noted by a reviewer for News.com.au, who went on to add that "one could never accuse Lady Gaga of lacking attention to detail in her live productions or failing to put in a wholehearted and energetic performance." Jenny Valentish from Time Out awarded the show in Melbourne five stars, calling Gaga "a phenomenal singer with an immense voice (...) who could try her hand at any genre", also praising her live band and the costume changes.

The National critic Saeed Saeed described the show as "hugely entertaining" and something that "delivers pop music's ultimate mandate: to dance your worries away". Writing about the subdued concert in Dubai due to religious sentiments, Mohammed Kadry from Khaleej Times noted that Gaga could still put on a "spectacle" and she "was determined to connect with her local audience as she attempted to piece together flattering colloquial phrases". Debra Kamin from The Times of Israel praised Gaga's vocals, adding that "show was everything Gaga promised and everything fans have come to expect from her — loud, florescent, sexually explicit and mind-numbingly bright."

Dave Simpson from The Guardian gave a positive review for the Birmingham concert, awarding the show with 4 out of 5 stars. He stated that "Gaga has often been accused of being all artifice and no heart, but tonight's show is a powerful statement from a star who refuses to be pinned down or written off." Daniel Dylan Wray from The Independent awarded the Birmingham concert with 4 out of 5 stars and described ArtRave as "loud, colourful and frequently emblematic of feel-good, throwaway party times". Katie Fitzpatrick from Manchester Evening News awarded the concert with 5 out of 5 stars. She praised Lady Gaga's voice, her live band, the outfits and the connection of the fans – especially in this show that Gaga helped a fan to propose to his partner on stage. Katie stated that "the ostentatiously named ArtRave may reaffirm that Gaga the show-woman is definitely about her art. But this little lady with the powerful set of lungs is also undoubtedly all heart." Ludovic Hunter-Tilney from the Financial Times rated the concert three out of five stars. He criticized the songs from Artpop except the title track, but complimented the acoustic and piano sequences.

== Broadcast and recording ==
On November 17, 2014, Gaga announced through her social medias that the last concert show, which took place at Bercy Arena in France on November 24, would be streamed live around the world, online on Yahoo! Live. The concert started with a 30-minute video presentation of Gaga's portraits, as shot by Robert Wilson, and which were previously exhibited at the Louvre Museum in Paris. The live stream broke records for Yahoo! Live and Live Nation.

== Set list ==
This set list is from the show in Newcastle, England, on November 22, 2014. It is not intended to represent all tour dates.

1. "Artpop"
2. "G.U.Y."
3. "Donatella"
4. "Venus"
5. "Manicure"
6. "Just Dance"
7. "Poker Face" / "Telephone"
8. "Paparazzi"
9. "Do What U Want"
10. "Dope"
11. "You and I"
12. "Born This Way"
13. "Jewels 'n Drugs" (interlude)
14. "The Edge of Glory"
15. "Judas" / "Aura"
16. "Sexxx Dreams"
17. "Mary Jane Holland"
18. "Alejandro"
19. "Bang Bang (My Baby Shot Me Down)"
20. "Bad Romance"
21. "Applause"
22. "Swine"

Encore

1. "Gypsy"

=== Notes ===
- "Fashion!" and "Cake Like Lady Gaga" were performed from May 4, 2014, to June 3, 2014.
- During the performance in New York City, T.I. joined Gaga onstage to perform "Jewels n' Drugs".
- During the performance in Calgary, Gaga performed "Hair".
- During the performance in Ottawa, Gaga performed a cover of George Gershwin's "I've Got a Crush on You".
- During the performance in Tel Aviv, Tony Bennett appeared on stage with Gaga to sing "I Can't Give You Anything but Love".
- During the performances in Vienna, Manchester and Barcelona, Gaga performed a cover of 4 Non Blondes's "What's Up?".

== Shows ==
List of concerts, showing date, city, country, venue, opening act, tickets sold, number of available tickets and amount of gross revenue
Date (2014)	City	Country	Venue	Opening act	Attendance	Revenue
May 4	Sunrise	United States	BB&T Center	Lady Starlight	12,977 / 12,977	$1,173,695
May 6	Atlanta	United States	Philips Arena	Lady Starlight; Hatsune Miku	10,480 / 10,480	$941,142
May 8	Pittsburgh	United States	Consol Energy Center	Lady Starlight; Hatsune Miku	12,185 / 12,185	$961,090
May 10	Uncasville	United States	Mohegan Sun Arena	Lady Starlight; Hatsune Miku	7,722 / 7,722	$564,692
May 12 (Note: The concert of May 12, 2014 in Washington, D.C. at the Verizon Center was originally planned to take place on May 15, but was rescheduled to avoid any potential conflict with the Washington Wizards playoff game.)	Washington, D.C.	United States	Verizon Center	Lady Starlight; Hatsune Miku	14,866 / 14,866	$1,014,800
May 13	New York City	United States	Madison Square Garden	Lady Starlight; Hatsune Miku	14,326 / 14,326	$1,625,812
May 15 (Note: The concert of May 15, 2014 in Philadelphia, Pennsylvania at the Wells Fargo Center was originally planned to take place on May 12 but was rescheduled to avoid any potential conflict with the Washington Wizards playoff game.)	Philadelphia	United States	Wells Fargo Center	Lady Starlight; Hatsune Miku	15,424 / 15,424	$1,037,606
May 17	Detroit	United States	Joe Louis Arena	Lady Starlight; Hatsune Miku	11,971 / 11,971	$954,173
May 18	Cleveland	United States	Quicken Loans Arena	Lady Starlight; Hatsune Miku	12,792 / 12,792	$1,000,814
May 20	Saint Paul	United States	Xcel Energy Center	Lady Starlight; Hatsune Miku	10,084 / 10,084	$796,395
May 22	Winnipeg	Canada	MTS Centre	Lady Starlight; Hatsune Miku	12,507 / 12,507	$974,017
May 25	Calgary	Canada	Scotiabank Saddledome	Lady Starlight; Hatsune Miku	12,662 / 12,662	$982,731
May 26	Edmonton	Canada	Rexall Place	Lady Starlight; Hatsune Miku	13,855 / 13,855	$1,053,861
June 2	San Diego	United States	Viejas Arena	Lady Starlight; Hatsune Miku	9,332 / 9,332	$851,927
June 3	San Jose	United States	SAP Center	Lady Starlight; Hatsune Miku	13,622 / 13,622	$1,201,315
June 26 (Note: The concert of June 26, 2014 in Milwaukee, Wisconsin at the Marcus Amphitheater is a part of Summerfest 2014.)	Milwaukee	United States	Marcus Amphitheater	Lady Starlight; Crayon Pop	23,089 / 23,089	$1,169,670
June 28	Atlantic City	United States	Boardwalk Hall	Lady Starlight; Crayon Pop	13,363 / 13,363	$1,366,626
June 30	Boston	United States	TD Garden	Lady Starlight; Crayon Pop	13,848 / 13,848	$1,190,212
July 2	Montreal	Canada	Bell Centre	Lady Starlight; Crayon Pop	12,709 / 12,709	$965,286
July 4 (Note: The concert of July 4, 2014 in Quebec City, Quebec at the Plains of Abraham is a part of the Festival d'été de Québec 2014.)	Quebec City	Canada	Plains of Abraham	—N/a	—N/a	—N/a
July 5 (Note: The concert of July 5, 2014 in Ottawa, Ontario at the LeBreton Flats is a part of the Ottawa Bluesfest 2014.)	Ottawa	Canada	LeBreton Flats	—N/a	—N/a	—N/a
July 7	Buffalo	United States	First Niagara Center	Lady Starlight; Crayon Pop	12,076 / 12,076	$874,785
July 9	Toronto	Canada	Air Canada Centre	Lady Starlight; Crayon Pop	15,813 / 15,813	$1,355,260
July 11	Chicago	United States	United Center	Lady Starlight; Crayon Pop	15,112 / 15,112	$1,314,360
July 14	San Antonio	United States	AT&T Center	Lady Starlight; Crayon Pop	10,125 / 10,125	$888,278
July 16	Houston	United States	Toyota Center	Lady Starlight; Crayon Pop	11,410 / 11,410	$967,441
July 17	Dallas	United States	American Airlines Center	Lady Starlight; Crayon Pop	11,949 / 11,949	$1,006,048
July 19	Paradise	United States	MGM Grand Garden Arena	Lady Starlight; Crayon Pop	24,948 / 24,948 (Note: The score data is representative of the two shows in Las Vegas, Nevada at the MGM Grand Garden Arena on July 19 and August 1 respectively.)	$2,379,981
July 21	Los Angeles	United States	Staples Center	Lady Starlight; Crayon Pop	26,923 / 26,923	$2,444,324
July 22	Los Angeles	United States	Staples Center	Lady Starlight; Crayon Pop	26,923 / 26,923	$2,444,324
July 25 (Note: The July 25, 2014 surprise concert in Atlanta is a part of "Microsoft Week".)	Atlanta	United States	Centennial Olympic Park	—N/a	—N/a	—N/a
July 30	Phoenix	United States	US Airways Center	Lady Starlight; Babymetal	8,187 / 8,187	$670,198
August 1	Paradise	United States	MGM Grand Garden Arena	Lady Starlight; Babymetal	—	—
August 2	Stateline	United States	Harveys Outdoor Arena	Lady Starlight; Babymetal	7,189 / 7,189	$997,536
August 4	Salt Lake City	United States	EnergySolutions Arena	Lady Starlight; Babymetal	9,359 / 9,359	$516,910
August 6	Denver	United States	Pepsi Center	Lady Starlight; Babymetal	10,660 / 10,660	$853,570
August 8 (Note: The concert at the KeyArena on August 8, 2014 was originally scheduled to take place on May 28, but was postponed due to Gaga having a severe case of bronchitis.)	Seattle	United States	KeyArena	Lady Starlight	10,882 / 10,882	$874,668
August 9 (Note: The concert at the Rogers Arena on August 9, 2014 was originally scheduled to take place on May 30, but was postponed due to Gaga having a severe case of bronchitis.)	Vancouver	Canada	Rogers Arena	Lady Starlight	13,449 / 13,449	$962,524
August 13	Chiba (Note: Promoted as Tokyo)	Japan	QVC Marine Field	Lady Starlight; Momoiro Clover Z	50,453 / 50,453	$7,874,436
August 14	Chiba	Japan	QVC Marine Field	Lady Starlight; Momoiro Clover Z	50,453 / 50,453	$7,874,436
August 16 (Note: The concert of August 16, 2014 in Seoul, South Korea at the Olympic Stadium is a part of the AIA Real Life: NOW Festival 2014.)	Seoul	South Korea	Olympic Stadium	Crayon Pop	55,000 / 55,000	—N/a
August 20	Perth	Australia	Perth Arena	Lady Starlight	8,120 / 8,120	$744,661
August 23	Melbourne	Australia	Rod Laver Arena	Lady Starlight	17,253 / 17,253	$1,732,910
August 24	Melbourne	Australia	Rod Laver Arena	Lady Starlight	17,253 / 17,253	$1,732,910
August 26	Brisbane	Australia	Brisbane Entertainment Centre	Lady Starlight	9,249 / 9,249	$913,894
August 30	Sydney	Australia	Allphones Arena	Lady Starlight	20,445 / 20,445	$1,818,090
August 31	Sydney	Australia	Allphones Arena	Lady Starlight	20,445 / 20,445	$1,818,090
September 10	Dubai	United Arab Emirates	Meydan Racecourse	Lady Starlight	8,365 / 8,365	$1,835,201
September 13	Tel Aviv	Israel	Yarkon Park	Lady Starlight	18,984 / 18,984	$1,786,945
September 16	Istanbul	Turkey	ITU Stadium	Lady Starlight	25,157 / 25,157	$1,123,106
September 19	Athens	Greece	Olympic Stadium	Lady Starlight	26,860 / 26,860	$941,091
September 23	Antwerp	Belgium	Sportpaleis	Lady Starlight	15,188 / 15,188	$1,394,133
September 24	Amsterdam	Netherlands	Ziggo Dome	Lady Starlight	14,196 / 14,196	$1,273,725
September 27	Herning	Denmark	Jyske Bank Boxen	Lady Starlight	10,534 / 10,534	$916,980
September 29	Fornebu (Note: Promoted as Oslo)	Norway	Telenor Arena	Lady Starlight	8,948 / 8,948	$708,509
September 30	Stockholm	Sweden	Ericsson Globe	Lady Starlight	13,657 / 14,811	$1,529,285
October 3	Hamburg	Germany	O_{2} World Hamburg	Lady Starlight	11,430 / 11,430	$1,094,202
October 5	Prague	Czech Republic	O_{2} Arena Prague	Lady Starlight	10,734 / 10,734	$776,719
October 7	Cologne	Germany	Lanxess Arena	Lady Starlight	13,189 / 13,189	$1,139,559
October 9	Berlin	Germany	O_{2} World Berlin	Lady Starlight	10,555 / 10,555	$950,331
October 15	Birmingham	United Kingdom	Barclaycard Arena	Lady Starlight	18,221 / 18,221 (Note: The score data is representative of the two shows in Birmingham at the Barclaycard Arena on October 15 and November 13 respectively.)	$1,785,628
October 17	Dublin	Ireland	3Arena	Lady Starlight	11,497 / 11,497	$1,117,109
October 19	Glasgow	United Kingdom	SSE Hydro	Lady Starlight	21,957 / 21,957 (Note: The score data is representative of the two shows in Glasgow at the SSE Hydro on October 17 and November 16 respectively.)	$1,960,395
October 21	Manchester	United Kingdom	Phones 4u Arena	Lady Starlight	14,719 / 14,719	$1,625,149
October 23	London	United Kingdom	The O_{2} Arena	Lady Starlight	42,845 / 42,845	$4,631,817
October 25	London	United Kingdom	The O_{2} Arena	Lady Starlight	42,845 / 42,845	$4,631,817
October 26	London	United Kingdom	The O_{2} Arena	Lady Starlight	42,845 / 42,845	$4,631,817
October 30	Paris	France	Zénith Paris	Lady Starlight	12,301 / 12,301	$1,071,553
October 31	Paris	France	Zénith Paris	Lady Starlight	12,301 / 12,301	$1,071,553
November 2	Vienna	Austria	Wiener Stadthalle	Lady Starlight	11,586 / 13,598	$1,055,678
November 4	Assago (Note: Promoted as Milan)	Italy	Mediolanum Forum	Lady Starlight	10,852 / 10,852	$989,889
November 6	Zürich	Switzerland	Hallenstadion	Lady Starlight	13,259 / 13,259	$1,314,684
November 8	Barcelona	Spain	Palau Sant Jordi	Lady Starlight	17,513 / 17,513	$1,420,987
November 10	Lisbon	Portugal	MEO Arena	Lady Starlight	7,345 / 7,345	$365,313
November 13	Birmingham	United Kingdom	Barclaycard Arena	Lady Starlight	—	—
November 16	Glasgow	United Kingdom	SSE Hydro	Lady Starlight	—	—
November 20	Sheffield	United Kingdom	Motorpoint Arena Sheffield	Lady Starlight	11,528 / 11,528	$672,004
November 22	Newcastle	United Kingdom	Metro Radio Arena	Lady Starlight	8,779 / 8,779	$824,555
November 24	Paris	France	Bercy Arena	Lady Starlight	13,018 / 13,018	$1,249,746
Total					971,227 / 999,636 (97%)	$80,824,008

== Personnel ==
Personnel taken from ArtRave: The Artpop Ball tour book.

Management

- Live Nation Global Touring (Worldwide) – promoter (Worldwide)
- MAC Cosmetics – tour sponsor (Worldwide)
- Absolut Vodka (US), O_{2} (UK) – tour sponsor
- Bobby Campbell at Haus of Gaga – management
- Lane Bentley at Haus of Gaga – Day-to-day management
- Vincent Herbert for Streamline – manager
- Mary Jo Spillane – road manager
- Ky Cabot – tour manager
- Peter van der Veen – personal security
- Kevin Bernal – personal security
- Robert Marshall – personal security

Main personnel

- Lady Gaga – main performer
- Richard "Richie" Jackson – visual director, choreographer
- Brandon Maxwell – fashion director
- Roy Bennett – production, lighting designer
- Michael Bearden – musical director
- Lacee Franks – creative co-ordinator
- Alexander Delgado – art director
- Vincent Herbert – manager for Streamline
- Sonja Durham – managing director, Haus of Gaga
- Ashley Gutierrez – personal assistant
- Tara Savelo – make-up
- Frederic Aspiras – hair stylist
- Perry Meek – costume designer
- Sandra Amador – stylist
- Mary Jo Spillane – road manager
- Peter van der Been – personal security
- Robert Marshall – personal security
- Sarah Nicole Tanno – dancers and band's make up artist
- Travisean Haynes – dancers and band hair stylist
- David Odom – physical therapist
- Asiel Hardison at Haus of Gaga – dance captain
- Graham Breitenstein – dancer
- Karen Chuang – dancer
- Montana Efaw – dancer
- Kevin Frey – dancer
- Nick Geurts – dancer
- David Masterson – dancer
- Ian McKenzie – dancer
- Tamina Pollack-Paris – dancer
- Sloan-Taylor Rabinor – dancer
- Victor Rojas – dancer
- Gianinni Semedo Moreira – dancer
- Theresa Stone – dancer
- China Taylor – dancer
- Brockett Parsons – keyboards
- George "Spanky" McCurdy – drums
- Lanar "Kern" Brantley – bass
- Ricky Tillo – guitar
- Tim Stewart – guitar
- Lady Gaga – guitar and keyboard/piano (on "Venus"), keytar (on "Just Dance"), piano/keyboard (on "Dope", "You and I" and "Born This Way")
- LeRoy Bennett – production designer, lighting designer
- Whitney Hoversten – lighting director
- Jason Baeri – lighting programmer
- Oli James – lighting tech (crew chief)
- Alex Peters – lighting tech
- Mark Pritchard – lighting tech
- Mike Rothwell – lighting tech
- Leif Le Page – lighting tech
- James Jones III – lighting tech
- Matt "Skinny" Le Roux – lighting tech
- Chris Bartlett – lighting tech
- Jason Danter – production manager
- Alicia Geist - production coordinator
- Ky Cabot – tour manager
- Brian Wares – stage manager
- Chris Organ – stage manager/show caller
- Lisa Bruno - head of wardrobe
- Bert Pare – video director
- Tim Brennan – video engineer
- Loren Barton – video programmer
- Vincent Cadieux – video tech (crew chief)
- Maxime Dube-Morais – video tech
- Erin Lynch – video tech
- Patrick Vaillancourt – video tech
- Eric Simard – Hippo Media server tech
- Hayden Hale – laser operator and programmer
- Reid Schulte-Deme – special effects tech (crew chief)
- David Harkness – special effects tech
- Robin Henry – automation operator and programmer
- Todd Green – head carpenter
- Lonnie Adams – carpenter
- Kirk "Rockit" La Rocco – carpenter
- Erin O'Brian – carpenter
- Corey Proulx – carpenter
- Ernie Wagner – carpenter
- Scotty Waller – carpenter
- Carl Young – carpenter
- Ryan Snyder – carpenter
- Mike Farese – head rigger
- Danny Machado – rigger
- Kenny "Skippy" Ruhman – rigger
- Rick Wilmot – rigger
