= Mark McGowan (performance artist) =

British performance artist

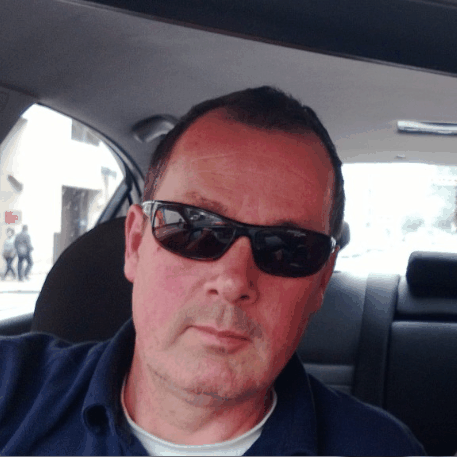
- McGowan in 2013
- Born: 9 June 1964 (age 62); Clapham, London, England
- Education: Camberwell College of Arts (BA)
- Known for: Performance art, video blogger, social commentator, political activist, installation art, shock art

Mark McGowan (born 9 June 1964) is a British street artist, performance artist, film maker and public protester who has gone by the artist name Chunky Mark and more recently The Artist Taxi Driver. By profession, McGowan is a London taxi driver and occasional University speaker and arts tutor. McGowan is known internationally for his performance art including shock art, street art and installation art, and as a stuntman, internet personality, video blogger, social commentator, social critic, satirist, political activist, peace activist, and an anti-establishment, anti-war, anti-capitalist, anti-monarchist and anti-power elite protester. Under the artist name "Chunky Mark", McGowan entered the mainstream news in the early 2000s for his unconventional, satirical, sometimes comedic and/or ironic, and often absurd approach to public protest and demonstration. Chunky Mark conducted hundreds of performances in the UK and dozens around the world, stirring up some international attention, further debate on what "art really is", controversy; and both support and mockery alike from intellectuals, the art world, private corporations, the police, the military, the tabloids and the public. Often McGowan has not applied for police permission beforehand.

McGowan abandoned the Chunky Mark persona in late 2010 and fully adopted the "Artist Taxi Driver" persona for his web blog on YouTube, where he films himself alone in his taxi between fares, often wearing dark sunglasses, and in which he rants passionately and emotionally about the news and issues of the day. The Artist Taxi Driver's official YouTube channel (still under the "ChunkyMark" name) by 2013 had thousands of videos made by McGowan, with almost 30,000 subscribers, and his most popular video viewed 220,000 times.

== Biography ==
=== Personal life ===
McGowan has said that despite eating animals in a number of his protests, he is in fact a staunch vegetarian in his private life, which made the animal eating protests more difficult for him. McGowan is critical of the British royal family, is a republican, and claims he has never voted since "all politicians are the same" and the developed world has become "kleptocratic" rather than democratic.

McGowan was diagnosed with bowel cancer in 2011 and was still receiving treatment in 2013.

McGowan supported himself financially through higher education in a wide variety of different jobs; as a barman, milkman, cleaner, scaffolder, builder.

=== Art, education and speaking ===
Before concentrating on solo performance art, stunts and protests, McGowan was affiliated with the Young British Artists, although not officially a member of the YBAs. McGowan was heavily involved with The Children of !WOWOW! movement of visual, performance and musical artists which had a strong presence in his native Peckham and was controversial for its affiliation with rave culture. In 2003, !WOWOW! organised warehouse parties in Peckham which had thousands of attendees including Lauren Bush, the former US President's niece, who was accompanied by two bodyguards.

McGowan did menial work but still painted for a decade before entering the art world. In 2003, at age 33, McGowan earned a B.A. degree in Fine Art from Camberwell College of Arts, where he still occasionally lectures as a second year elective performance art tutor. McGowan also occasionally lectures to MA students at Chelsea College of Art where he is an associate, and he also occasionally speaks at Goldsmiths University of London, a public research university. McGowan has a second degree in the History of Art from the latter institution. In the past McGowan has worked with the Scottish Arts Council and the University of Central England in Birmingham;

== "Chunky Mark" ==
From 2001 to 2009, McGowan made dozens of unconventional street art protests and notable stunts under his "Chunky Mark" stage name to garner public attention to matters he cared about, or to raise attention to issues he believed were not in the wider public knowledge. They promote or bring attention to, through unconventional means, community awareness and personal responsibility. In his native country, McGowan as "Chunk Mark" performed hundreds of pieces of performance art, stunts and protests from 2001 to 2009. According to arts magazine My Village London, "His witty and sometimes bizarre performance work has attracted wide media attention, and he has been featured in nationwide tabloids, Art Monthly, has been covered by the BBC, ITV and Channel 4." Daniel Scagnelli of Arts London said: "McGowan could arguably be called one of the most controversial performance artists in the country and has added depth to his university’s alumni list.

=== McGowan's explanation of his performance art ===
When asked if he considered himself an "attention seeker" by My London of BBC News in 2003, McGowan explained his reasoning and motives behind his performance art and demonstration:

"I grew up on the infamous North Peckham Estate in south London... I turned to performance art because I found it a much more accessible medium to deliver what I was trying to express... The way to engage [poorer people in London] in art is to bring it into the street, which is what I'm doing – not by putting it in the White Cube or the National Gallery. Most people from Peckham are not going to go there – there's no-one walking around the National Gallery or the White Cube with a string vest on."

=== UK protests, demonstrations and stunts ===
Some of McGowan's more notable and titled protests and stunts in the United Kingdom include:

- 2002 Roll Over – At Christmas 2002, McGowan rolled along the pavement from the Elephant and Castle to Gallery 1,000,000 mph in Bethnal Green Road, a distance of four and a half miles, wearing yellow rubber marigold cleaning gloves and singing We Wish You A Merry Christmas. He did this in an attempt to "get people to be kind and polite to cleaners for Christmas", inspired by a time he'd worked as a cleaner and hadn't received a kind comment or a thank you. As of the stunt itself, McGowan suffered severe bruising. He also told the BBC that the inspiration for rolling came from an Indian man who rolled 2,400 miles across India and became known as the "Rolling Saint."
- 2003 Poor Little Lamb 2003 – Starting at Bloomberg Art Gallery, Manchester, McGowan circumnavigated the city on 1 July 2003, spending several hours pushing a dead sheep around in a pram. It was a piece about proposals to cut child benefits.
- 2003 Rocket 2003 – in July 2003 McGowan catapulted Aida Lipscombe, 71, in a foil-covered home-made "space capsule rocket" up a ramp from launch pad, through some thin wood to create a "crashing" effect and into a water-filled container outside Camberwell College of Arts, central London. The stunt was intended, according to McGowan, to raise attention to the plight of the pensioners who McGowan believed were being increasingly abandoned by the government, and also to highlight the attitude of the young towards the elderly. He explained he had come to the idea after seeing an elderly man pushed over in the street. After contacting Age Concern, McGowan had received over 70 letters from pensioners expressing interest in the project, narrowed the shortlist to seven, but chose Mrs Lipscombe because of her baseball cap and hair beads. Just before doing the stunt, Aida told BBC News: "I'm not nervous or anything – I've done much worse things in my life."
- 2003 Chips and Beans – McGowan "turned himself into a full English breakfast to celebrate English culture and food" for this stunt. For this stunt, McGowan sat in a bathtub for twelve days which had been set up in the shop window of the London House Gallery. The bathtub was filled with baked beans and tomato sauce, and McGowan sat in it with two chips up his nose and 7 lb sausages wrapped around his head. Explaining the stunt to BBC News, McGowan said that the stunt came about after being visited by an Italian friend who criticised the English diet and McGowan felt he had to do something to defend it. According to the gallery manager, Sarah McIntyre, "He got so cold that his system went all funny and he was weeing in the water. The place stank."
- 2004 Big Toe Bus Pull – On 18 August 2004 in Camberwell, London, McGowan dragged a 7.5 tonne RouteMaster bus 30 meters with his big toe, making several attempts before completing the task. The bus had a driver but only for health and safety reasons. Speaking to BBC News, McGowan explained: "This project was a protest against the excessive use of bus lanes and against mayor of London Ken Livingstone's ridiculous traffic strategy. It is stupid that our already narrow roads are being carved up, causing endless road nightmares for car drivers."
- 2005 Brighton Rocks 2005 – In protest of what he believed to be diminishing coastlines (and specifically gardening programs suggesting people take large builder's sacks of beach stones home) McGowan attempted to cartwheel sixty miles from Brighton Pier to Margaret Beckett's office (the then-Secretary of State for Environment, Food and Rural Affairs), Nobel House, Smith Square, London SW1. He attempted this with two 12 lb (5 kg) rocks tied around each ankle and eighteen sticks of pink Brighton candy rock sellotaped across the front of his face. McGowan sustained a back injury early on but continued, finally collapsing after four days and went to consult a chiropractor. The stunt brought attention to the issue and afterwards local authorities said they may be looking at prosecuting anybody taking away large quantities of beach stones.
- 2005 Canterbury Tale 2005 – McGowan crawled on his hands and knees for 60 miles, starting out at London Bridge on 26 December 2005, and finishing at Canterbury Cathedral on 6 January 2006. He did this with a rose clenched between his teeth, 18 boxes of chocolates tied around him and ankles and a triangular sign on his back saying "Could You Love Me?". The stunt was intended to make people consider those who are on their own at Christmas, and especially to the loneliness felt by many elderly. McGowan was greeted by Canon Ron Diss outside the cathedral and was amazed to be allowed to crawl inside. The stunt was also covered by Al Jazeera.
- 2006 Road Rage 2006 – For this piece in March 2006, Chunky Mark dressed as a traffic warden and allowed members of the public in Bethnal Green, East End of London, to attack him with items he himself provided, such as rubber piping, for 8 hours. It was intended to have a "therapeutic value for angry motorists." Pictures of McGowan as the parking attendant being beaten made it onto the BBC piece In pictures: 50 years of the traffic wardens.
- 2008 Sandman 2008 – As part of the Margate Rocks art and environment festival on the Kent coastline in May 2008, McGowan conceived of this stunt to encourage people to take more British seaside holidays rather than going abroad. McGowan intended to stay buried up to the neck in sand on the beach for two days, but only managed 30 hours.

==== Where's Daddy's Pig? ====
In April 2013 McGowan launched a new piece of performance art protest entitled Where's Daddy's Pig in which he would give a letter written by him and his two children to David Cameron. On 24 April 2013 he pushed a "daddy Cameron pig" oinking pig toy on wheels along the pavement with his nose from King's College Hospital (where his cancer had been diagnosed) to 10 Downing Street and the Bank of England.

=== Cancelled protests ===
==== Cancelled sailing project ====
In late 2003 McGowan announced to The Independent that he intended to "sail" a shopping cart 400 miles from Peckham in London to Glasgow in Scotland as part of a performance titled Ocean Wave Part 1 and Ocean Wave Part 2, using his feet as a rudder and an artists brush as an oar. McGowan intended to apologise to the people there for the hanging of William Wallace in the 14th century and collected numerous gifts from people along the way for that purpose. The stunt was however cancelled after 17 days and 65 miles by bad weather and never resumed.

==== Exhaust fumes protest ====
In 2005, McGowan was named irresponsible in a BBC article for planning to leave the engine of his Audi running continuously for a year in an art protest he would call The Unnecessary Journey 2005. It was intended to be a protest for cleaner air and to make people think about leaving their exhaust fumes running.

==== Cancelled Irish protest ====
In February 2008, the Irish Independent reported that McGowan planned to drag 300 kg of potatoes through the streets of Dublin while dressed as Bertie Ahern; his aim was to symbolise the burden being carried by the Taoiseach. The protest was banned on the grounds that it would be "too politically sensitive."

=== Controversy and legal challenges ===
==== Assaulted 2001 ====
McGowan dressed as an officer of the Metropolitan Police in the window to Clapham Art Gallery on 7 October 2001 and invited members of the public to come in and beat him with his truncheon, as a piece of performance art entitled Assaulted 2001. The gallery said: "No resistance will be shown; no arrests will be made. This is an excellent opportunity for members of the public to vent their frustration, anger and resentment towards the police without fear of retribution. So if you have had an injustice done to you or if you just feel like giving a policeman a good hiding come along. No beating to take longer than five minutes. Booking is available and group beatings may be considered." McGowan said: "It’s because the police are the long arm of the law. The police commissioner said I needed my head seeing to, which I thought was really good. It would be really good if they decided to ban it. So what next? Maybe something about domestic violence, or some racially charged performance. Perhaps I’ll get a whole lot of Albanians and give them £2 and squash them all into art gallery and call it Freight Removal."

==== "Keying" hoax and vandalism accusations ====
McGowan told the BBC: "I keyed 17 cars in Glasgow's West End in March and 30 in Camberwell, south London. I do feel guilty about keying people's cars but if I don't do it, someone else will. They should feel glad that they've been involved in the creative process. I pick the cars randomly. I got the idea when my sister and brother-in-law's cars were keyed. Is it jealousy that causes someone to key a car? Hatred? Revenge? There is a strong creative element in the keying of a car, it's an emotive engagement." There was widespread condemnation of the stunt. Michelle Jordan, a spokeswoman for the Scottish Arts Council, said: "Mr McGowan is more likely to get a visit from Strathclyde's finest than any funding from us." Strathclyde Police said: "We are aware of Mr McGowan." A Metropolitan Police spokesman said: "Clearly this would be criminal damage and if we receive any allegations we will take them very seriously and investigate."

McGowan then soon admitted to BBC News that the whole keying escapade had been a hoax; there were only two cars, one belonged to a barmaid friend of his from Camberwell and the other belonged to his brother-in-law. McGowan reiterated that he had never scratched any cars, he just said he did and had photographs of himself taken next to already scratched cars. McGowan told BBC News: "I never keyed any cars... the whole thing has just been a nightmare. All I wanted to do was highlight the plight of people who have had their cars scratched, which has somehow spiralled out of control. My family and friends have shunned me and someone rang into a radio show and said they wanted to rip my head off. But at least I've shown people do care about car crime."

==== Water wastage ====
McGowan was in the news in July 2005 for his installation The Running Tap, a stunt whereby he left the water running in the backroom kitchen of House Gallery in Camberwell. This was done to raise attention to the issue of water leakage and water wastage. When it began to receive publicity and controversy, McGowan told BBC News: "We are all culpable, we all wastewater and that includes Thames Water [London's privatised water company who at the time were considering a hosepipe ban for the public at a time prolonged drought in southern England, whilst simultaneously being accused of massive water wastage], The company itself wasted millions of liters of water through leaks. Mine's art." McGowan said: "Basically it's an art piece for people to come and look at and enjoy aesthetically, it is also a comment on a social and environment issue." His installation used 9,200 imperial gallons (42,000 L) of water a day, and if left on for a full year as he intended, would have wasted 3.9 million imperial gallons (18,000 m^{3}) of water and cost £11,400. It was turned off several times by protesters of the protest.

McGowan had some surprising support. Sarah McIntyre, part of the collective that runs the House Gallery, said: "I was a bit nervous at first because I'm against wasting water, but I think it's a good cause. The amount wasted can be justified because of the awareness raised," she says, adding that visitor numbers have doubled in the past week, from a trickle to a small stream. Plus it's a damn sight better than the other time McGowan conducted an in-house action, sitting in a bath of cold baked beans for a fortnight to celebrate the great English breakfast after a foreign friend criticised our national fare. He got so cold that his system went all funny and he was weeing in the water. The place stank" said McIntyre. At one point, a US computer analyst was told he can buy the "artwork" for £1,500 – despite the fact McGowan had used the gallery's own sink and taps. McGowan received a cease and desist order from Thames Water with threats of legal action on 29 July 2005, McGowan told the BBC: "I have inspired the public to save more than 800,000 liters by making them aware of water shortages. I will just turn it off – maybe have a drink afterwards."

In March 2006, McGowan announced his plan to try again and to leave six taps running for a year at undisclosed locations around London, saying that it was a continuing protest against private control of water in the UK. A Thames Water spokesman said: "For the sake of the environment we call on Mr McGowan to abandon this childish game now." McGowan later dropped The Running Tap for good.

==== Westminster protests ====
In December 2005, Maya Evans was convicted under Section 132 of the Serious Organised Crime and Police Act for reading out the names of soldiers who died in Iraq at the Cenotaph War Memorial. This stated that demonstrators must get police consent before protesting within a half-mile radius of the House of Commons. The new legislation was intended to remove Brian Haw, an anti-war protester who had camped in Parliament Square for ten years and had fought numerous legal battles including one in the High Court where he argued that his encampment was started before the legislation.

Speaking to BBC News, McGowan said: "The fact that I did not get arrested shows that it is really stupid law, because I was protesting. This law should not be allowed, it is everyone's democratic and constitutional right. It's the only area worthy of protesting in because that is where laws are passed. If you lose the right to protest, something's really wrong. The protest was a success."

==== Row with soldiers ====
McGowan's week-long performance in November 2006, funded with £4,000, entitled Dead Soldier 2006 was in conjunction with a retrospective of his work at University of Central England, in Birmingham. The money had come from the university and the Arts Council. It was intended to raise questions about the horrific nature of conflict whilst at the same time McGowan was supposed to do a piece which was neither anti-war nor pro-military. Widespread criticism appeared in the tabloids when it emerged McGowan intended to lay down on the floor for a week in Birmingham's busy New Street, a pedestrianised area, to impersonate a dead British soldier.

University of Central England Curator Andrew Hunt, who commissioned the work, defended it, saying: "I think it is worth spending public money to prompt people to think about these issues. It's very good value for money for a month-long exhibition and the new performance and we'll get a lot of visitors both locally and nationally." McGowan said to BBC News: "It's a comment on things that are happening in the world at the moment. It's not anti-war or pro-military but my response to things that are happening as an artist. It's about the reality of the soldier, we see an image of them on TV but the reality is that it's horrific sometimes. Hopefully, the performance will make people think, they'll come in and out of offices and shops and I'll still be there."

McGowan did so for one day, on 14 November during which he was criticised in a national newspaper for being a "disgrace" in light of British deaths in Iraq and Afghanistan. Despite receiving no complaints from the public at the time of the protest, West Midlands Police decided to ask McGowan to move along for his own safety on the second day. He was defiant and returned until 20 November. Talking to BBC News, McGowan explained: "The role of a soldier in war is to be used as a weapon and my role as the artist is being a witness to our time. What am I supposed to paint, pictures about nice things? Well, things right now are not very nice."

==== Swan eating ====
Artist Eats Swan 2007 was a protest against royalty, the rich and the upper classes in which Chunky Mark ate a cooked swan he claimed he had found dead on a West Country farm, outside the Guy Hilton Gallery in East London as part of the galleries' January 2007 "So Sad" exhibition which also included such art luminaries as Will Self. Speaking to The Times, which noted that prosecution was a possible outcome of the stunt, McGowan said: "I read that the Queen is the only person who's allowed to eat a swan – it's outrageous. Mum will freak out if I get arrested, but then again, I could be a martyr for the working class. Let's see what happens." The protest featured on Channel 4 News during which it was revealed police were investigating McGowan as eating a swan is a privilege only legally available to the Queen. McGowan received death threats from animal rights activists, although no legal action was pursued against him in the end.

==== Corgi eating ====
On 30 May 2007, Mark McGowan conducted two pieces of protest performance art he entitled Eating The Queen's Dogs, in which he ate the meat of a Pembroke Corgi; one in a radio broadcast on London's Resonance FM radio station, and the other was live and outside a posh cafe surrounded by press near Downing Street. The event was in protest about a fox hunt, led by Prince Philip, on the Queen's Sandringham Estate, where a fox was allegedly mistreated. McGowan, who had made the corgi meat into kebabs, told the BBC that the corgi had died of natural causes at a dog breeding farm.

Eating The Queen's Dogs attracted international attention in the press and tabloids. It was claimed that Yoko Ono was present at the radio broadcast version of Eating The Queen's Dogs and even joined in; Ono later denied this to the BBC. The live stunt received some significant global attention and was covered by Yahoo, was shown on American television by CBS News and on Canadian television by CBC News; the Queen is also the monarch of Canada and the protest there was described as "shock art gone too far." Despite counter-protests and threats of legal action, the stunt went ahead without incident. Mrs Poorva Joshipura, of the People for the Ethical Treatment of Animals and director of Peta's European arm, supported McGowan, saying: "The idea of eating a corgi will make many people lose their lunch, but certainly foxes who are hunted for so-called entertainment, are no less capable of feeling fear and pain." Further defending Eating The Queen's Dogs at a later date, Mrs Joshipura also said : "It is high time the royals joined the rest of us who are opposed to cruelty to animals."

==== Reenactment of the death of Jean-Charles de Menezes ====
On 29 November 2008, McGowan performed The Reenactment of the Assassination of Jean-Charles de Menezes, an ode to an innocent Brazilian national shot dead by the Metropolitan Police inside Stockwell Underground station in London the year previously, less than a fortnight before the verdict on the death was due to be released. McGowan told This Is London: "I am not doing this to raise my own profile. I think there is a real sense of apathy about what happened to this innocent man. People need to take note of what is happening here, rather than thinking about who is going to win X Factor and what they are getting for Christmas. Hopefully this performance will do this." The Londonist reported: "It could be seen as a rather confused and distasteful attempt to treat the public’s post-traumatic stress disorder, forcing the public to confront the event one more time to gain some kind of control over the event itself and our reactions to it. It could be seen as live protest art, an expression of dismay and discontent at the current inquest."

==== Scotland Yard protest ====
For this piece of protest performance art entitled Ballerina Pig 2009 on Saturday 14 June 2009, McGowan danced around outside Scotland Yard (the headquarters of London's Metropolitan Police force) for ten minutes whilst dressed as a pink ballerina and wearing a pig snout over his face, before being threatened with arrest and moved on by police officers.

==== Support of Raoul Moat ====
In September 2010, McGowan staged a one-man play, The Re-enactment of the Assassination of Raoul Moat, at the Deptford X festival, funded by the National Lottery and Arts Council. This was conceived by McGowan to commemorate the life and crimes of Newcastle upon Tyne-born murderer Raoul Moat.

The play saw McGowan wearing a cardboard box with the face of Moat on it. McGowan attempted to tell the story from Moat's point of view. He also played other roles such as a newsreader and the blinded PC David Rathband.

This issue along with Mark McGowan's stage play The Re-enactment of the Assassination of Raoul Moat were discussed on British national talk show The Wright Stuff under the topic "waste of cash?"; the host claimed that he "hates the Facebook culture promoting Moat as a hero" and McGowan was described as the most "self-promoting, publicity-seeking sicko out there." McGowan later apologised, saying "I would not want to upset anybody and if my play has caused anyone any unnecessary grief I am sorry. I am an artist and this is just an interpretation of the event". Victim Support added "It can be viewed as being in bad taste especially so soon after the events." McGoean defended the play to the BBC, saying "Being a witness to your times is very challenging, it's difficult not to affect people if you are doing your job. One of the things that people have a problem with is art as a form of representation of a contemporary issue. The role of art is to challenge."

=== International protest and demonstration ===
==== Europe ====
At 10pm on Friday 19 December 2008, McGowan dressed as a Christmas tree and attempted to stand on a street in Lisbon crying for 72 hours. McGowan said: "Hopefully this art performance or sculpture will carry a message to the people of Lisbon and Portugal who are lucky enough to have their families and friends around them at Christmas, that there are some people who are less fortunate and maybe we could extend our goodwill to them as they find the holiday season quite painful and sad. It is particularly moving that this event should take place in Rua do Poço dos Negros, surely a horrible area to be in during the 15th century, when King Manuel I decided to build a well where dead black slaves were to be buried in piles. It's going to be very very difficult to keep crying continuously for 72 hours dressed as a Christmas tree."

==== United States ====
In protest of what he perceived to be ever-increasing totalitarianism in the United States such as the Patriot Act, and also the war on terror, and in support of human rights, in early 2007 McGowan traveled to New York City to perform Kick George Bush in the Ass. In late February, McGowan crawled around the streets of Manhattan for 72 hours, and covering 36 miles in total, whilst dressed up as and wearing a mask of US President George W. Bush and a "Kick My Ass" sign on his back. "George Bush is mental," he says. "His global policies are terrible. I want people to get some satisfaction when they kick Bush." The event was covered by Reuters international news agency. In a mostly critical article in British newspaper The Guardian, which described the stunt as "juvenile", McGowan stated: "It's a kind of therapeutic engagement. Hopefully people will be able to come and kick me (the President, George Bush) as hard as they like, and gain some comfort in the fact that they can say I kicked George in the ass."

== "Artist Taxi Driver" ==
McGowan invented the Artist Taxi Driver persona when he was denied entrance to the Frieze Art Fair on 14 October 2010, and for four consecutive nights; Frieze was an annual event he had been to every year previously. American-born colleague of McGowan, Jasper Joffe, had had his paintings banned from the same event; Joffe claimed he believed this was because he had debated with [Frieze director] Matthew Slotover at the Saatchi Gallery and during which debate Joffe had claimed that "the art world was becoming all about money."
