= !Wowow! =

London-based art collective

!Wowow! is a collective in Peckham, London. Otherwise known as The Children of !Wowow!, they are a group of artists, fashion designers, writers and musicians, who have promoted numerous art events and parties in London and Berlin.

== History ==
!Wowow! began in the back of the Joiners Arms in Camberwell in 2003 as a performance night in a pub by Hanna Hanra and Matthew Stone. In 2004, the collective squatted a large Victorian co-op in Peckham South East London and made it into an artist-run space. They include fashion designer Gareth Pugh, performance artist Millie Brown, video installation artist Adham Faramawy, James Balmforth and artist Matthew Stone. Other artists to have shown in the space include Boo Saville, Gareth Cadwallader, Florence & The Machine's Isabella Summers and Ellie Tobin.

In 2003, !Wowow! organised warehouse parties in Peckham. At times club nights with 2000 people took place. One of these was attended by Lauren Bush, the former U.S. President's niece, and her two CIA bodyguards.

The second show by the collective in December 2004 was of paintings, film, photography and performance by recent Slade graduates for a month in the Georgian building at 251 Rye Lane, Peckham, formerly occupied by the Co-op shop, which the artists gutted and refurbished. The artists, who curated the exhibition together, included Chloe Dewe Mathews with photographs of lidos, Matthew Stone with digital recreations of old paintings, Rachael Haines with surrealist inspired collages and Boo Saville with monkey paintings and biro drawings. The opening featured shamanistic chanting, a shopping Trolley Mardi Gras, live bands and a recreation of Michael Jackson's video Thriller by performance artist Lali Chetwynd's troupe.

In November 2005, the Children of !Wowow! organised a week-long event in a large warehouse in Peckham, curated by member Gareth Cadwallader, and in a number of smaller venues in the area, featuring members of the collective and also Mark McGowan. Events included Stolen Cinema with cult films from a local rental shop, Richard Elms' play Factory Dog, and a Greasy Spoon Art Salon Breakfast presided over by Lali Chetwynd and Zoe Brown. he week culminated with a party for 1,500 people, with 10,000 bottles of beer, 500 bottles of whiskey, and 13 live bands on stage. The bands included The So Silage Crew, Ludes, The Long Blondes, and Ivich Lives.

The Amazing squat created its own "distinctly odd harlequin-esque fashion style", through Gareth Pughs' participation. Hanna Hanra and Katie Shillingford edited Fashion/ Art/ Leisure, a fanzine affiliated with the group.

Matthew Stone said:

It was an opportunity to invest in what we believed in, rather than chipping off bits of our soul working as unpaid interns. The practicalities of not having to work meant that we could be playful with what we did, but some serious ideas came out of that ridiculous house.

Since the Imperials left their original building in 2006, they have organised events in Dresden and also squatted a Kwik Fit Garage in Camberwell for an exhibition. Millie Brown and Adham Faramawy have organised several art and music events. These have included an event in March 2007 in Birmingham. Along with the original group, several other artists and performers exhibited, including Theo Adams, Ben Schumacher, Lennie Lee, and Fayann Smith.

== See also ==
- Artist collective
- Lyndhurst Way
