= 78 Lyndhurst Way =

2000s occupied art space in south London

Coordinates: 51.4706°N 0.0743°W

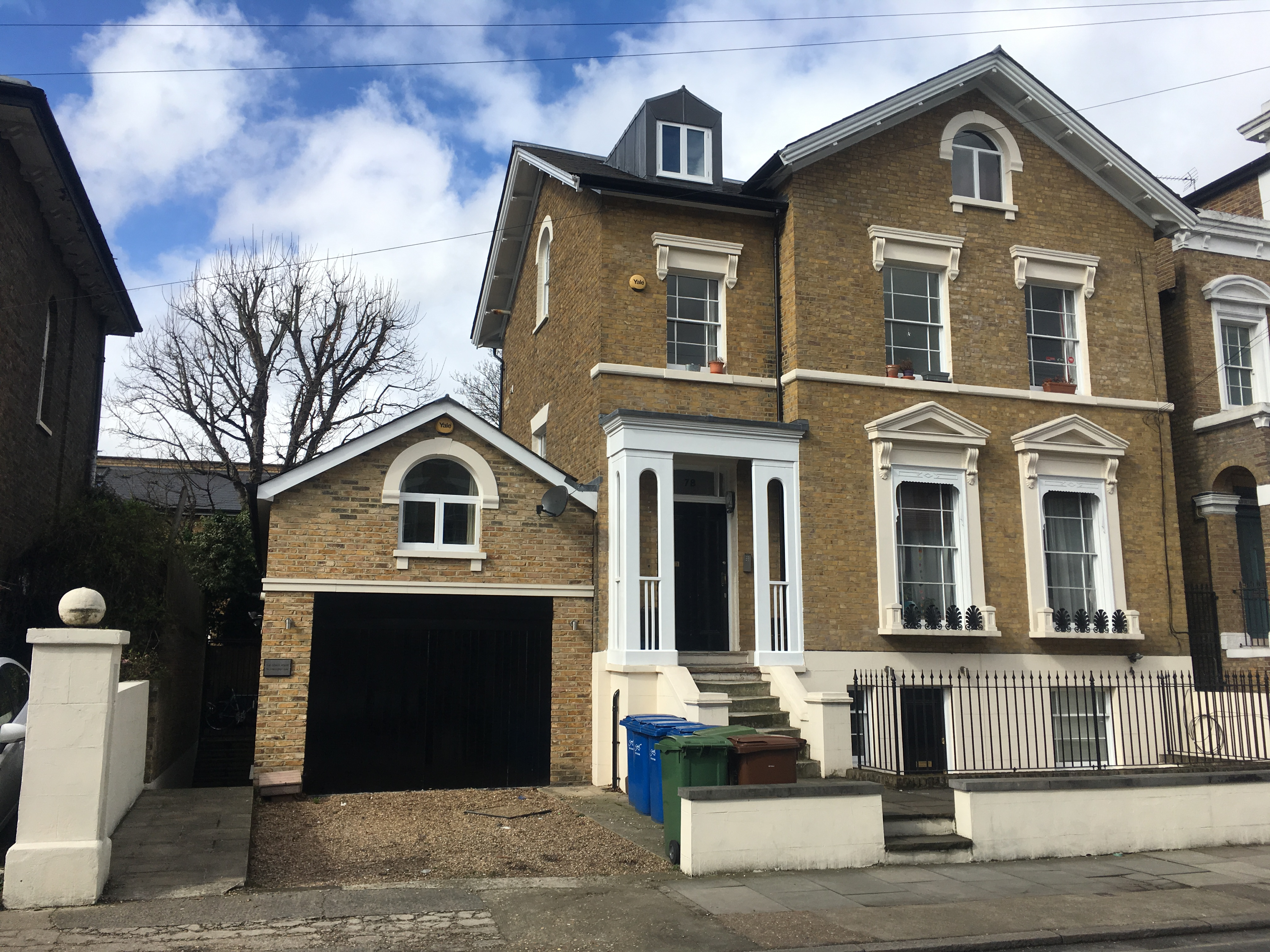
78 Lyndhurst Way in 2018

78 Lyndhurst Way was a squatted artist-run space in a Grade II listed Victorian-period house in Peckham, London in 2005 or earlier.

== Project ==
The artist cooperative which initiated the Lyndhurst Way exhibitions was composed of James Balmforth, Bobby Dowler, Christopher Green, Oliver Eales, Simon Simon Milner, Oliver Griffin and Shaun McDowell. The Lyndhurst Way exhibitions began with '10 Rooms and a Sculpture Garden' on 3 November 2006, and closed with 'Bold Tendencies' ending 7 October 2007. The Peckham Pavilion, one of the first Unofficial Pavilions (Venice Biennale) represented the Hannah Barry Gallery at the 53rd Venice Biennale in 2009. This included many Lyndhurst Way artists including the core group. Lyndhurst Way is sometimes referred to as an art collective, the "core" group of artists have worked together on international group shows including "PECKHAMNEWYORKPARIS". Lyndhurst Way was also the nucleus from which the Hannah Barry Gallery emerged from in January 2008.

== Exhibitions ==
Seven of the exhibitions were held in the squat house at number 78 Lyndhurst Way, the Grade II listed Victorian building followed by two off-site projects initiated by Hannah Barry with spaces provided by Southwark Council. The first of which was held at the now defunct Area10 project space in Peckham, and the second and final exhibition being the inauguration of the Bold Tendencies Sculpture Project which was originally held on the rooftop of Sumner House, an old school building in North Peckham.

Since the end of the 'Lyndhurst Way' exhibitions the core artists went on to be represented by Hannah Barry Gallery, and the Bold Tendencies Sculpture Project continues each summer on the rooftop of Peckham multistory car-park.

== See also ==
- Auto Italia South East
- City Racing
- !WOWOW!
