= The Chromatica Ball =

2022 concert tour by Lady Gaga

- World tour by Lady Gaga
- Promotional poster
- Location: Asia; Europe; North America
- Associated album: Chromatica
- Start date: July 17, 2022
- End date: September 17, 2022
- Legs: 4
- No. of shows: 20
- Attendance: 833,798
- Box office: $112.39 million

Lady Gaga concert chronology
- Lady Gaga Enigma + Jazz & Piano (2018–2024); The Chromatica Ball (2022); The Art of Personal Chaos (2025–2026)

The Chromatica Ball was the seventh headlining concert tour by American singer Lady Gaga in support of her sixth studio album, Chromatica (2020). Comprising 20 shows, it began on July 17, 2022, in Düsseldorf and concluded on September 17, 2022, in Miami Gardens. Initially conceived as a six-date-long, limited tour, new dates were added after it was delayed by two years due to the COVID-19 pandemic.

It is Gaga's first all-stadium concert tour and features a stage inspired by brutalist architecture. In line with the promoted album's themes, the show's narrative depicts a journey around trauma and healing. It is divided into distinct segments, each separated by a video introduction and a costume change. Gaga opted for a "darker, edgier" appearance for the tour in contrast to the pink cyberpunk look from Chromatica's earlier promotional imagery; her wardrobe included outfits by designers she frequently worked with in the past, such as Alexander McQueen, Gareth Pugh, and her sister, Natali Germanotta.

The tour received critical acclaim, with various outlets rating it with the highest score in their respective reviews. (Note: Attributed to multiple references:) Critics praised the visuals, the choreography, Gaga's vocal skills, and many of them singled out the piano segment as the concert's strongest part. On numerous American dates, Gaga interpolated political statements to her piano performances, addressing topics such as gun violence and abortion rights. According to Billboard Boxscore, The Chromatica Ball ultimately grossed $112.4 million from 834,000 tickets sold, breaking multiple personal attendance records and venue records. Gaga's September 2022 show at Dodger Stadium in Los Angeles was recorded for a concert film, which was released on May 25, 2024, on HBO and Max.

== Background and development ==
The tour was originally announced via Gaga's social media on March 5, 2020, as a six-date-long, limited concert series for the summer of that year, in support of her sixth studio album, Chromatica (2020). The announcement was accompanied by a dual-sided graphic, one side an extreme closeup of Gaga's face, sporting the 'Chromatica symbol' on her cheek, mostly covered with a long, straightened, pink wig. The other side of the graphic featured the tour's limited itinerary. When announced, the tour was set to be the singer's first all-stadium tour, with every date scheduled for a multi-purpose stadium, such as MetLife Stadium. Due to safety concerns over the COVID-19 pandemic, it was first postponed to summer 2021, before its second postponement to summer 2022.

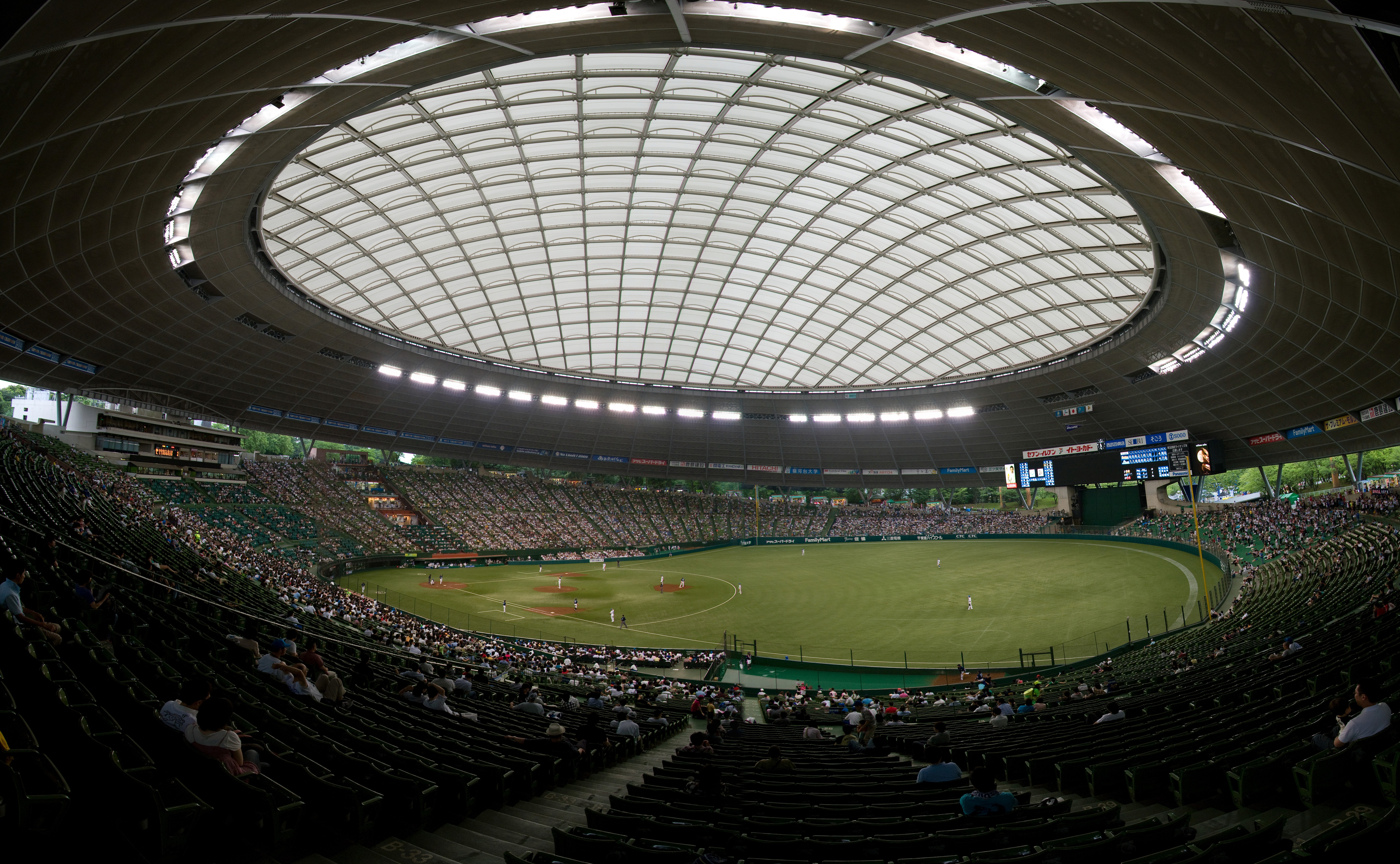
Two shows were held in Tokorozawa's Belluna Dome (pictured), which marked Gaga's first concerts in Japan in eight years.

New dates with additional venues in Europe and North America were scheduled and officially announced on March 7, 2022, making the once limited tour a 15-date engagement advertised as "The Chromatica Ball Summer Stadium Tour". On April 14, 2022, two dates in Tokorozawa were announced, marking Gaga's first concerts in Japan in eight years. To commemorate the event, a Japanese tour edition of Chromatica with extra content was released on August 31, 2022, and a pop-up shop selling merchandise items opened on the same day. Three additional North American shows in Hershey, Pennsylvania, Houston, Texas, and Miami Gardens, Florida, were added later on May 16, bringing the tour's total number of shows to 20.

During the prior tour, the Joanne World Tour (2017–2018), Gaga was forced to cancel the majority of the European leg of the concert series, due to severe pain caused by fibromyalgia. Shortly before The Chromatica Ball began, Gaga said there had been a period when she thought she might never perform again, but added that she was feeling more pain-free than she had in years. Rolling Stone's Hannah Ewens noted that the concert series was "carefully and successfully designed with Gaga's illness in mind", with fewer dates than any of her previous world tours, and the more complex choreography reserved for the latter section of the show.

== Production ==
=== Conception and stage setup ===
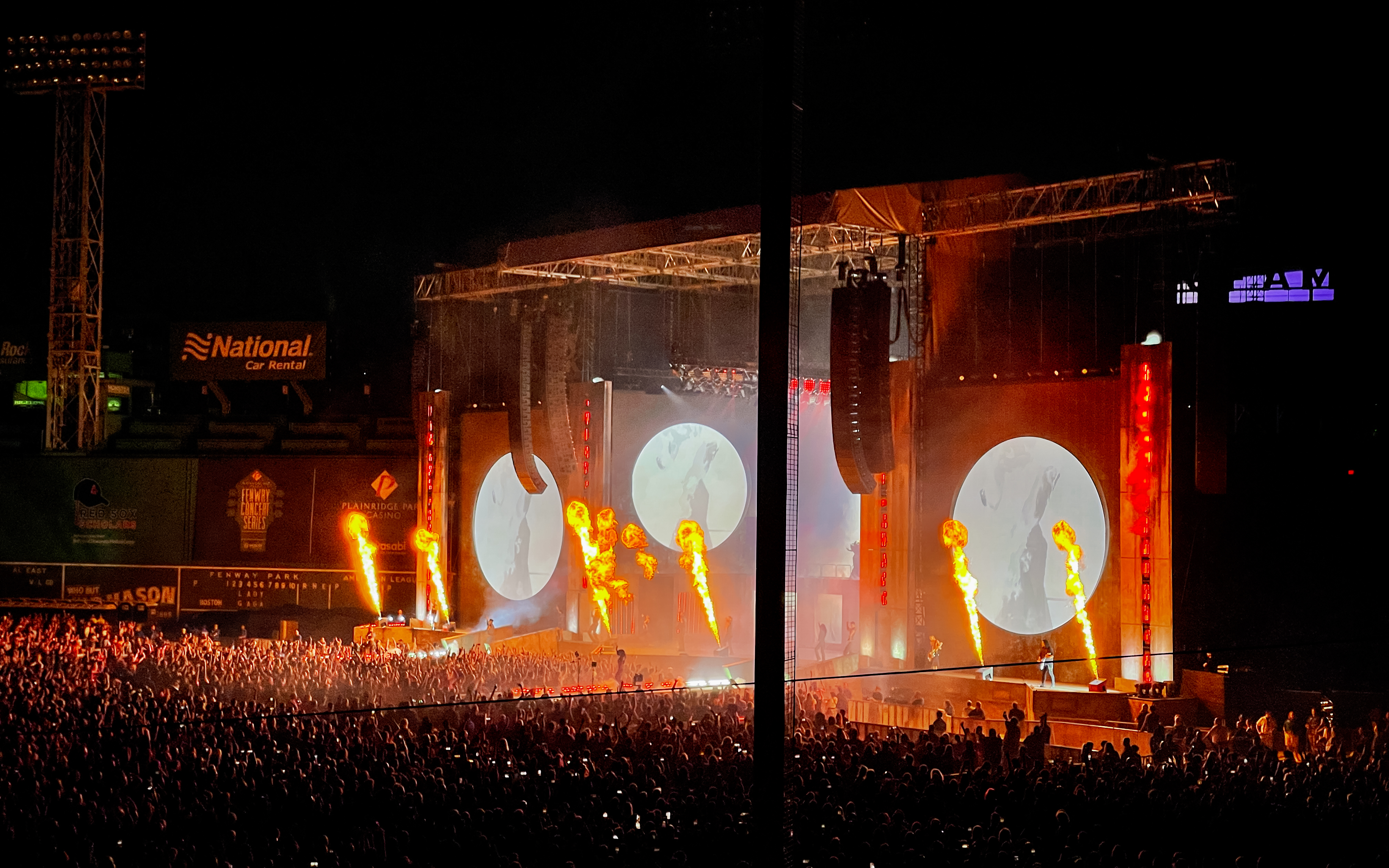
The Chromatica Ball's stage at Fenway Park, in Boston

The show is structured as a journey through trauma and healing, reflecting the themes of the promoted Chromatica album. On the day of the tour's first date, Gaga shared a video on Instagram explaining that the stage drew inspiration from brutalist architecture and raw materials, aiming to create a "savage and hard" visual exploration of one's personal struggles. She described the production as an abstract story combining her passions—art, fashion, dance, music, technology, and poetry. Separately, she noted that the show portrays the different stages and facets of grief she has experienced throughout her life.

The "imposing" stage set prompted media comparisons to a nightclub or S&M club in Germany. For The Telegraph's Neil McCormick, the black and white brutalist architecture invoked a "nightmarish Soviet dystopia as imagined by Fritz Lang", an opinion shared by Billboard's Joe Lynch, who found shades of Lang's 1927 expressionist film, Metropolis in the design. McCormick felt that "this initially bleak aesthetic" provided a striking contrast to the colorful costume changes and special effects. The main stage was accompanied by two catwalks, and five screens, each five stories high. A secondary, smaller stage housed Gaga's piano. Bedecked in tree branches, the instrument received comparisons to H. R. Giger's work. In addition to flamethrowers which provided pyrotechnic effects, the audience received LED wristbands which were glowing in time with the beat and changed color for each song.

=== Costume design ===
Christian Allaire of Vogue observed that Gaga omitted the pink cyberpunk look from the "Stupid Love" music video, embracing her signature "Mother Monster" image, which "favors a darker, edgier aesthetic". She called The Chromatica Ball "a glorious return to freaky-deaky dressing", and compared her outfits to those from The Monster Ball Tour (2009–2011) and the Born This Way Ball (2012–2013) concert tours, which were "ominously sci-fi (but high-fashion)." Serving as fashion director, Nicola Formichetti worked alongside stylists Sandra Amador and Tom Erebout to curate the tour's wardrobe. Throughout the show, Gaga wears outfits by Gareth Pugh, Alexander McQueen, Christian Lacroix, Aziz Rebar, Vex Latex, Dead Lotus Couture, and her sister Natali Germanotta's fashion brand, Topo Studio NY.

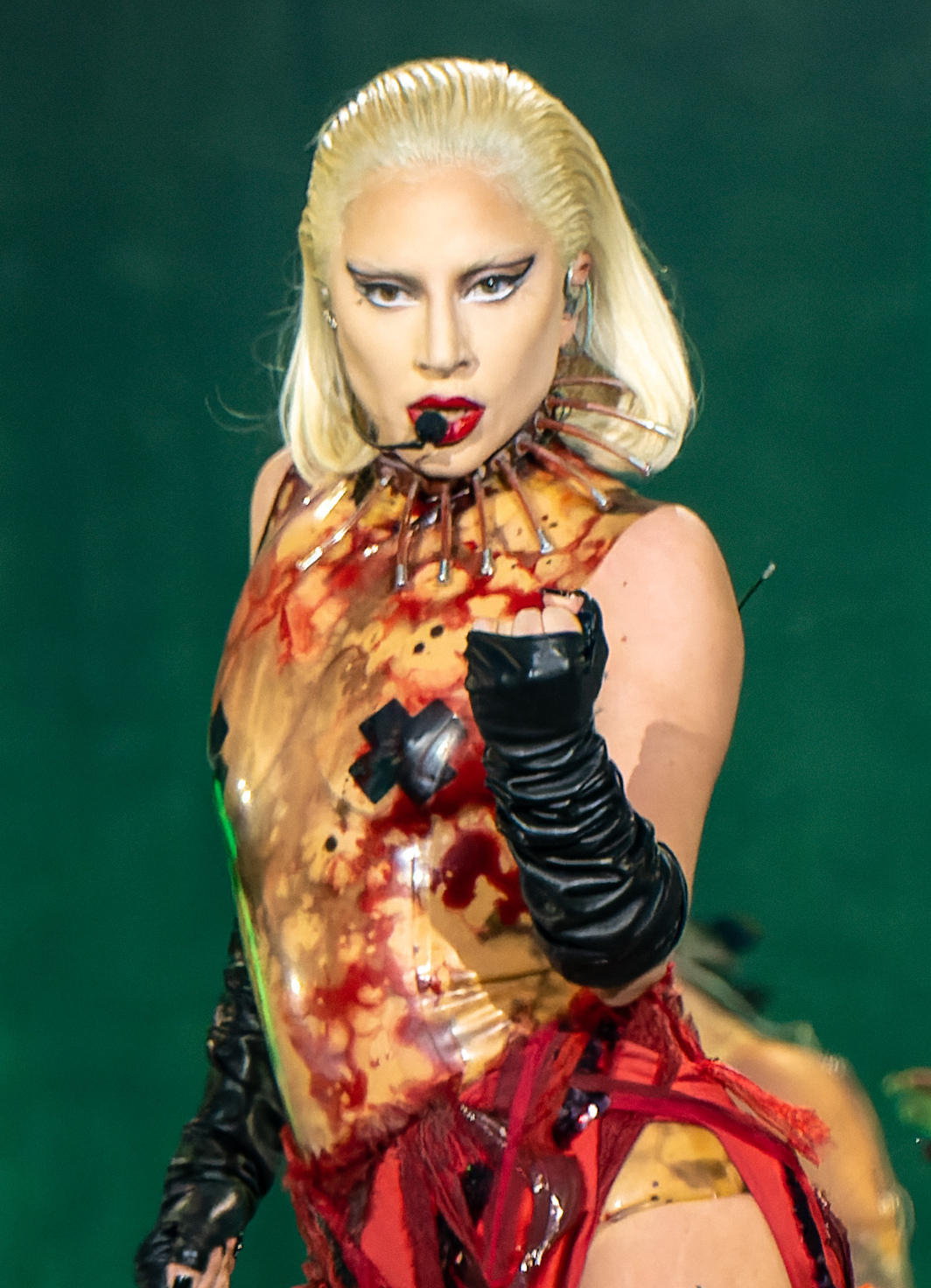
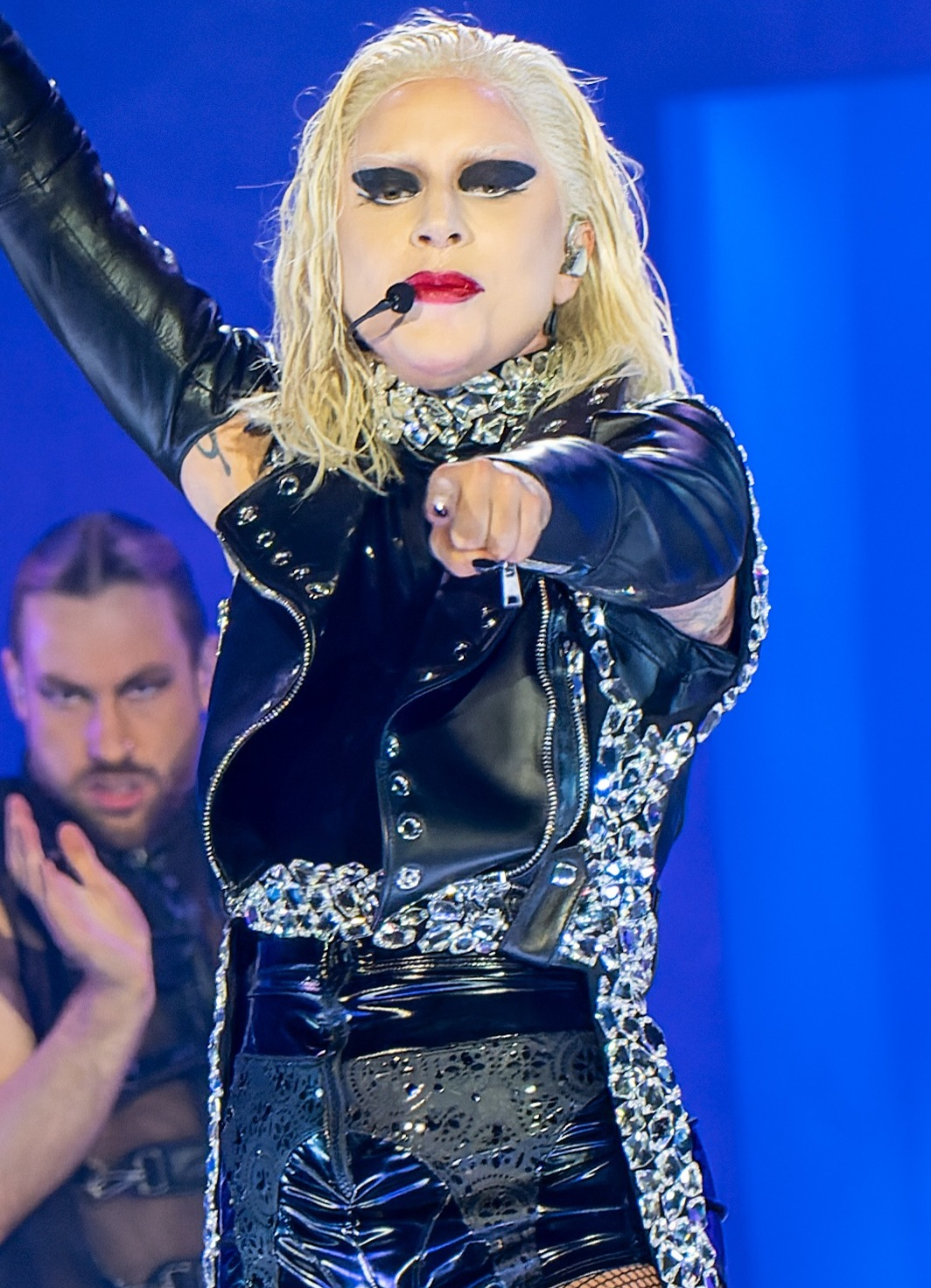
Gaga performing "Replay" in a nude latex bodysuit paired with a spiked necklace, followed by "Rain on Me" in a second latex look accented with crystal embellishments, topped with a leather jacket

Gaga's hard-structured sarcophagus costume in the opening sequence was inspired by David Bowie's 1979 Saturday Night Live performance. The sculptural outfit opened to reveal reflective surfaces inside, creating a dramatic visual effect. A later part of the show sees Gaga showcasing various golden looks. First she puts on a metallic gold moiré outfit by Alexander McQueen: her suit includes a cropped jacket with shoulder pads and a large lapel, and wide-legged trousers; removing the jacket, she shows off a sleeveless button-down collared shirt. Matching gold boots complete the monochrome look. Gaga then puts on a claw-like gold headpiece by Philip Treacy, along with a gold gown designed by her sister. For Daniel Rodgers of Dazed, the outfit hearkened back to Andrew Lloyd Webber's Joseph and The Amazing Technicolour Dreamcoat. Another McQueen outfit for a heavily choreographed part of the show was a crystal-embellished latex bodysuit and leather biker jacket, along with leather biker boots worn over black fishnet stockings.

Gaga also wore a blood-red gown with peak-shoulders, along with black leather boots and fingerless gloves. Removing the garment revealed a nude latex bodysuit splattered in red, blood-like goo, with taped X's over Gaga's nipples, along with a big, spiked necklace. This was later complimented with a sparkly red cropped puffer jacket and oversized sunglasses. A different latex outift consists of a BDSM-inspired corset with harness-like buckles and horned shoulders, along with loose-legged leather pants and a policewoman cap. Lauren O'Neill from i thought this "authoritarian" look recalled Gaga's music video for "Alejandro" (2010), while The Philadelphia Inquirer's Dan Deluca found it to be "an homage to 'Justify My Love'-era Madonna". During the piano ballad section of the concert, Gaga appears in a purple-and-black bodysuit and headpiece, described by journalists as "a very glamorous bug" and "a purple praying mantis". The headpiece further received comparisons to a prop from Star Wars' Mos Eisley cantina or The Fifth Element's Diva Plavalaguna character. Gaga's final look consists of a black-and-white bodysuit and leather biker jacket, along with fishnet tights, knee-high boots, and a bone-shaped handpiece.

== Concert synopsis ==
"Set in among the show's somewhat muddled narrative of rebirth and salvation, with its five defined acts separated by elongated video interludes [...], it reads like a comment on the suffocation of early, overwhelming fame"

— The Guardian's Michael Cragg interpreting the prelude of the show

The show was approximately 130-minutes long, divided into a prelude, four acts and a finale, each one accompanied by an interlude directed by Gaga's longtime collaborator Nick Knight. It follows a loose narrative of Gaga's journey from being trapped to becoming liberated. In an intro video, Gaga appears in a liquid-metal ballgown, and then as shadow-figure with four legs, wearing bulbous heels and a tall crown. The show's prelude sees Gaga reflecting on her career by performing her three earliest tracks from The Fame (2008) and The Fame Monster (2009). It opens with dancers performing to a synthesized arrangement of Bach's "Fugue No. 24", which transactions into "Bad Romance", echoing the sequence from the song's music video. Gaga appears atop a set piece reminiscent of a giant slab of concrete singing the track, while standing still inside a leather sarcophagus-type garment with only her face visible . Layers of her outfit are slowly removed as she spins around with limited motions for "Just Dance" and "Poker Face". The first act opens with an interlude which shows a brutalist hospital. Gaga then returns on stage seemingly covered in blood, and continues with three songs which share a common lyrical theme: the singer expressing her fears and internal struggles. She is lying on an operating table elevated in the air for "Alice". During "Replay", she is carried by one of her dancers, before the full choreography commences and Gaga screamingly commands the audience, "Put your paws up!" For "Monster", Gaga performs a dance routine with zombie motifs, and gets attacked and "eaten alive" by her dancers, only to re-emerge in a latex red jacket with pointy shoulder pads and jet-black sunglasses.

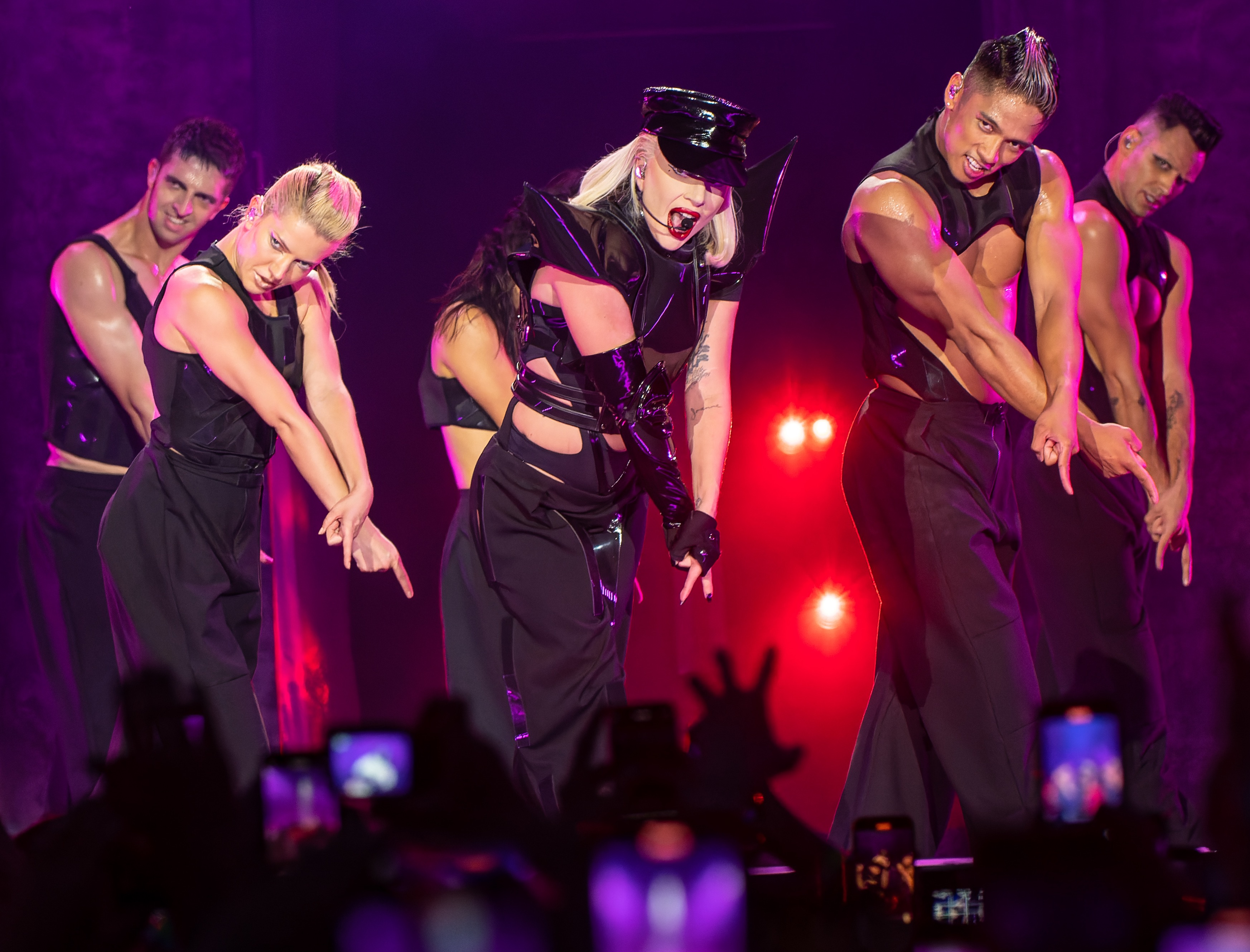
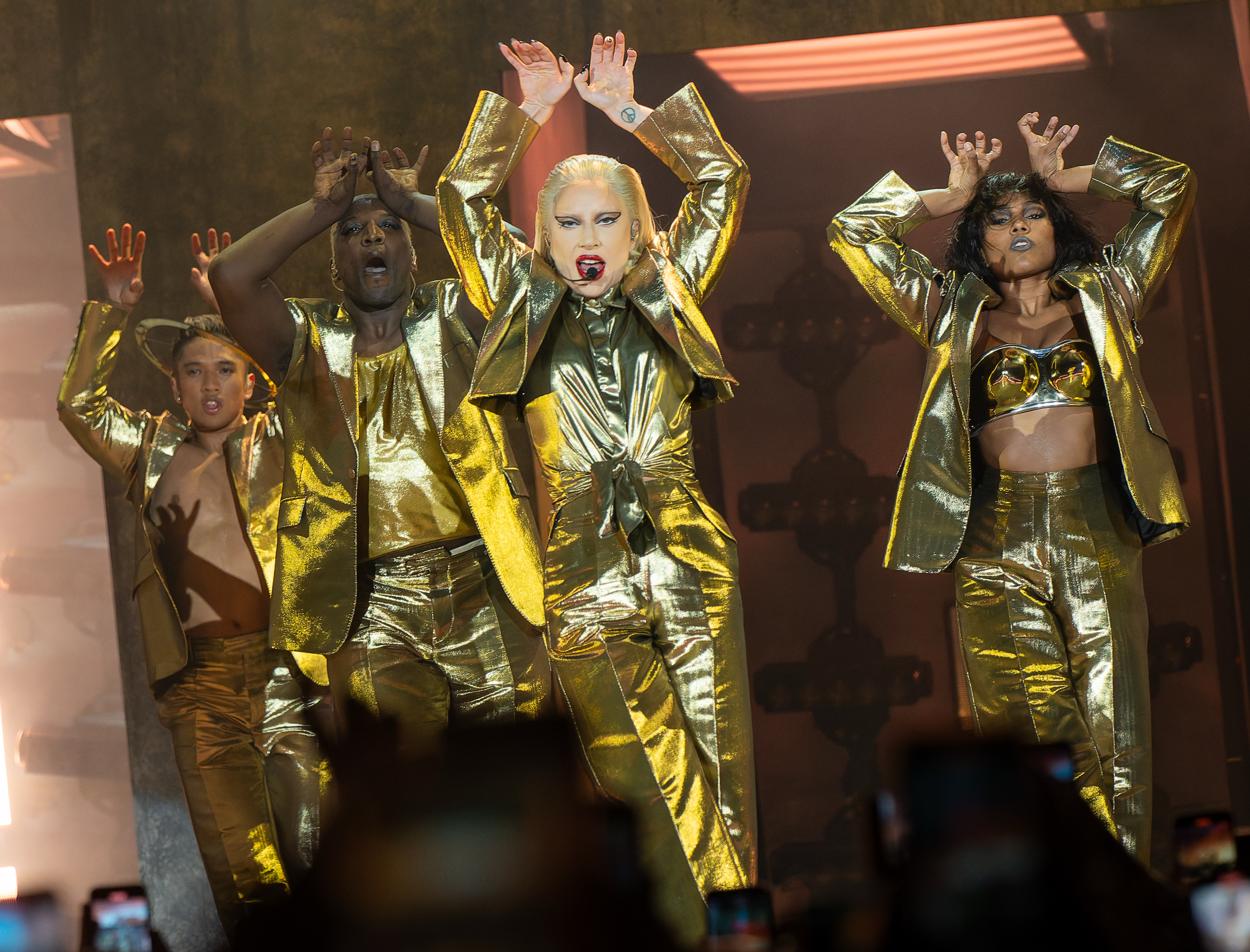
Gaga, surrounded by her dancers, performing "Sour Candy" (top) and "Babylon" (bottom)

After an interlude commences the second act, Gaga comes back on stage dressed in a vinyl dominatrix ensemble, while frantic red lights illuminate the stage for "911". "Sour Candy" is performed with synchronized choreography and Korean letters being displayed on the screens, followed by "Telephone", which sees the set's flamethrowers put into use. The performance of "LoveGame" involves "grinding guitars", which convert the track into an amalgamation of dance-pop and heavy metal. Another video sequence showcases celestial explosions while Gaga and her dancers change into matching gold satin for the third act. Gaga asks the audience if they ever had to battle for their lives, and performs "Babylon", voguing together with her dancers. She dedicates the song to Alexander McQueen. Gaga then puts on a face-covering hat and slowly walks through the audience in a pathway between her main stage and the smaller, second stage, while singing "Free Woman". She reminds her audience, "this is a ball, and everyone's welcome here", as she sits down to her piano which is set inside a sculpture of thorns. After proclaiming that she sees plenty of people in the audience who know exactly who they are, she performs her self-acceptance anthem "Born This Way", initially in a stripped back rendition, before switching to the song's uptempo and choreographed version.

Another visual showcases Gaga dressed in wedding gowns, covered in flowers and jewels. She then returns to the piano for the fourth act in an insect outfit to perform two songs from A Star Is Born (2018), "Shallow" and "Always Remember Us This Way". During "The Edge of Glory", Gaga briefly stops for a speech in which she salutes the audience for their bravery during the pandemic. She talks about the sorrowful state which inspired her to write "1000 Doves" and expresses regret for concealing her pain with a joyful pop track before playing it in on the piano, the way she originally intended. Gaga stands on the piano bench while leaning forward to reach the keys during "Fun Tonight". She dedicates the song to anyone who are out with their friends, but not having fun inside. Gaga receives a microphone stand for "Enigma", and spins the stand above her head during the performance. In the last video interlude, Gaga recites a sonnet that talks about art and the responsibility of the artist. For the celebratory finale, she performs "Stupid Love" and "Rain on Me" in a crystal-embellished bodysuit; the latter song opens and closes with Gaga lying flat on her back. She returns one last time for an encore, dressed in latex and leather, and sporting a metallic claw. Guitarists and pyrotechnic effects accompany her for the performance of Top Gun: Maverick (2022) theme song "Hold My Hand". Gaga declares her love to the audience by saying "you may not always hold my hand, but I’ll always hold yours." She raises her metallic claw and hand to form a heart. As she expresses her thankfulness for everyone coming to the show, the screen displays her claw one last time. Then, the lights go out as she walks off stage.

== Critical reception ==
=== Europe ===
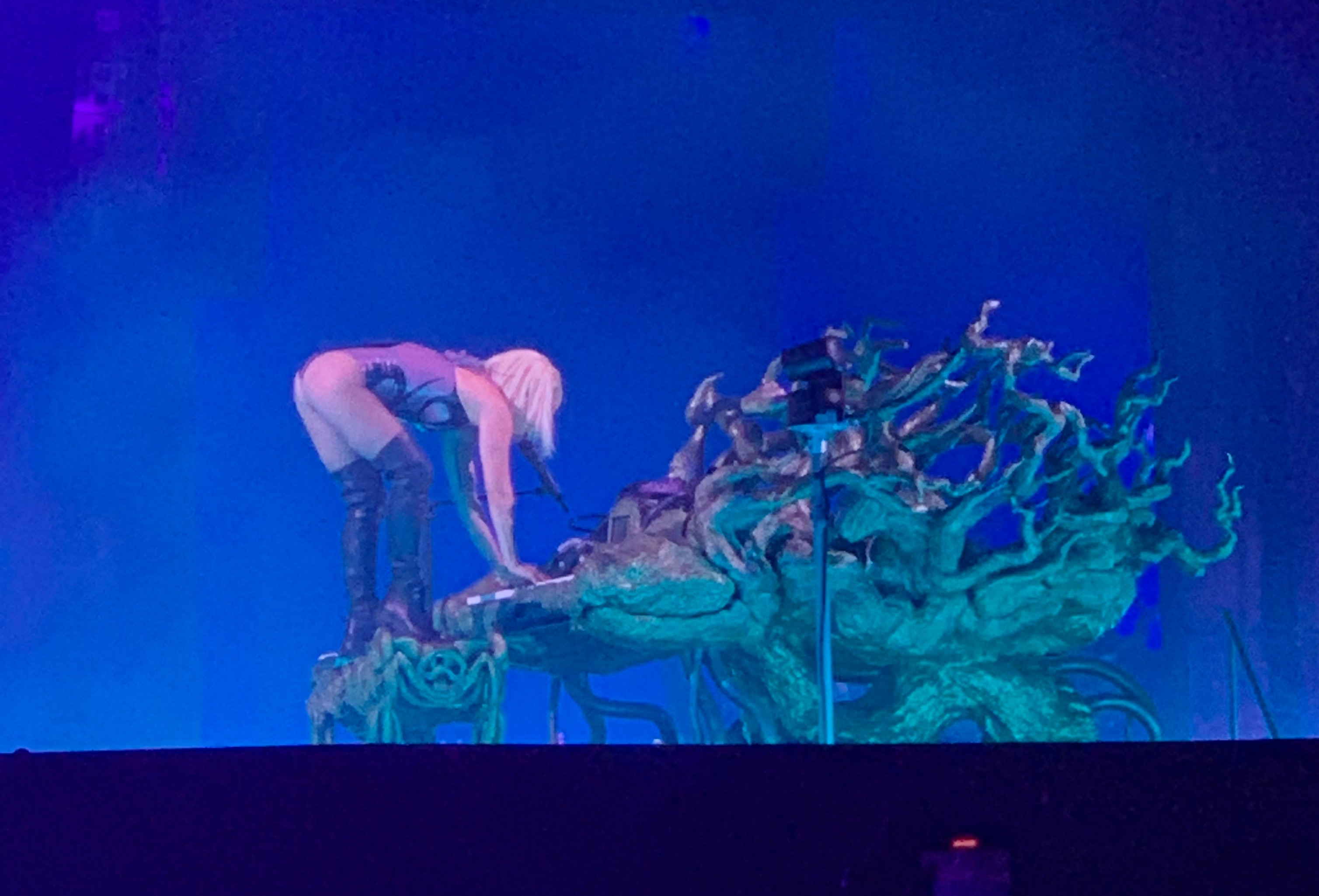
Gaga performing "Fun Tonight" while playing on the piano, which is set inside a sculpture of thorns

Reviewing the Düsseldorf show, Boris Pofalla of Welt compared it to a rock concert, noting the "hands in the air, flashing bracelets around the wrists, several guitarists with trapezoidal instruments on stage booms, twirling dancers and, very impressively, many flamethrowers." He concluded that performance marked the "return of a performer who can rightly be called one of the greatest pop stars alive and perhaps the last." Similarly, David Cobbald of The Line of Best Fit wrote that "Gaga proves herself as this generation's rockstar".

In a five-star review for The Telegraph, Neil McCormick described the concert as "clearly meant as much to the artist as the audience, adding real emotional impact to an absolutely slam-bang pop spectacular. It is fantastic to have such an immense talent back where she belongs." Lauren O'Neill from i also awarded five stars, calling Gaga "one of the best performers in the world to watch live", praising the production and dancing, and highlighting the acoustic section: "there are few vocalists who do better when it's just their voice and the keys". Writing for Rolling Stone, Hannah Ewens gave five stars, praising Gaga as "one of the greatest living musical performers" and pointing to the piano section as the highlight.

Michael Cragg of The Guardian described the show as "high camp" and gave it 4 out of 5 stars. NME's Nick Levine awarded five stars, calling it "utterly brilliant" and a "thrilling, high-concept return from pop's finest". Adam Davidson of Clash remarked that the show was "as predictably unpredictable as you’d expect from a Lady Gaga concert with everything from incredible choreographed dances to avant-garde theatrics and lots of special effects that made it a night to remember". Arwa Haider of the Financial Times gave five stars, praising the "tremendous attention to detail" in Gaga's designer costumes and mid-song metamorphoses, as well as her vocal power — "soaringly soulful and screamingly punkish in turn" — and "slick choreography triumphant." The London Evening Standard's Gemma Samways described it as "an extraordinary stage show that more than matched the ambition of the album," "as ludicrous as it was compelling, and all the more unforgettable for it," highlighting the "perfect marriage of visuals and sonics" and Gaga's "truly extraordinary vocals."

=== North America ===
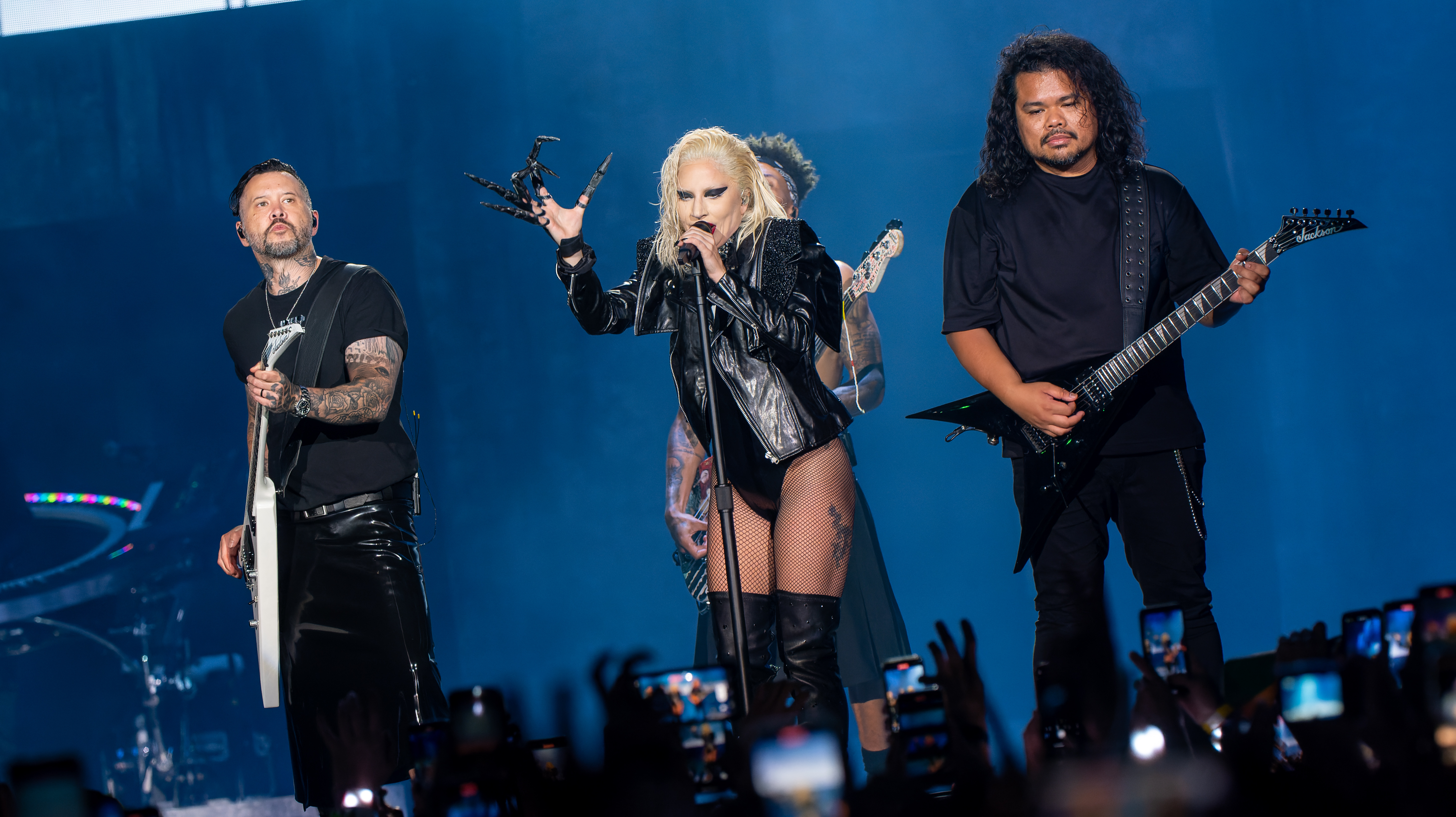
Gaga performing "Hold My Hand" as the show's encore, with her guitarists accompanying her

Writing for Consequence, Sarah Kurchak called the concert the "can't-miss pop event of the summer", noting it "mixed moments of triumph, vulnerability, celebration, defiance, heartache". USA Today's Melissa Ruggieri described the show as a "trippy journey", while the Boston Herald's Jed Gottlieb called it a "P. T. Barnum-on-acid spectacle".

Joe Lynch of Billboard highlighted the piano section, writing that "Gaga's vocals were fully audible and impressive from start to finish, but during this part of the show, we're treated to the depths of her substantial pipes and her deep attachment to the energy of the crowd." Similarly, Selena Fragassi of the Chicago Sun-Times called it "the most evocative" part of the show, where "Gaga finally sat still long enough for her impeccable vocals to shine." She praised Gaga's "authentic human connection" and the "Herculean effort of costuming, choreography, lighting and set design that will go down as one of her career best." Bob Gendron of the Chicago Tribune described the performance as "a performance for the ages," noting that "Gaga exuded bigger-than-life confidence yet repeatedly exhibited generous degrees of sincerity and humility," while also highlighting her "skilled dancers" and "versatile backing band."

Brittany Spanos of Rolling Stone wrote that Gaga "puts on one of the best productions in pop" while also shining vocally, and praised the setlist for moments "when the old merged with the new," which she found "deeply satisfying." However, she felt the encore, "Hold My Hand", was "a little flat", suggesting that "Rain on Me" would have been a stronger closing song. The Dallas Observer's Carly May Gravley said "the show felt bigger than just one album and served as almost a manifesto for the singer, combining her love of music, fashion, film and theater to pull together her sprawling catalog and create a cohesive statement." Mikael Wood of the Los Angeles Times called Gaga "a live singer through and through," noting that she is uniquely "committed to exposing the cracks in the armor of a superstar’s self-mythologizing."

Some reviewers noted minor pacing issues: Dan Deluca of The Philadelphia Inquirer felt the five-act structure with video interludes "lost momentum at times," and Chris Willman of Variety observed a similar "stall mode" during costume changes, though he praised the piano segment and Gaga's "dance-teria mode."

=== Asia ===
Writing for Yomiuri Shimbun after the concerts in Japan, Yusuke Tsuruta noted Gaga's "lively" presence and "eccentric costumes [which] are synonymous" with her, and added that thanks to her confident singing voice, the stripped-down, piano part of the show managed to captivate the audience just as much as her choreographed, high-energy performances. Ken Ishii of Sankei Shimbun also saw the Tokyo concert as a theatrical, futuristic spectacle blending extravagant visuals, powerful vocals, and a chaotic mix of past and future that showcased Gaga's unique artistry.

== Commercial performance ==
On June 16, 2022, Billboard reported that the tour had surpassed $80 million in early ticket sales across its 20 shows. According to Arthur Fogel, the CEO of Live Nation's Global Touring Division, the shows in London, Paris, Boston, Tokyo, Toronto, Chicago, and Düsseldorf were sold out with over a month left until the tour's kickoff in July. Fogel spoke very highly of the commercial response to the tour's dates on sale, adding his only source of disappointment is "that we don't have more time to add more shows." He cited that Gaga's schedule, which included her Las Vegas residency, simply did not allow time for more tour dates to be scheduled.

Earning $112.4 million from 834,000 tickets sold, throughout the tour's run, Gaga broke multiple personal attendance records and venue records. During her concert at the Stade de France on July 24, Gaga performed in front of 78,000 people, making this date the largest crowd of her career at the time. She has the all-time top gross at Oracle Park ($7.4 million) and gross and attendance at Wrigley Field ($6.9 million; 43,019). On August 19, the singer broke the record for the highest attendance for a single concert at Fenway Park in Boston, performing to 37,200 people. The show also broke the record for the highest-grossing concert ever at the same venue, with over $5.7 million in ticket sales. The show at Hersheypark Stadium on August 28 grossed over $4 million, selling over 30,000 tickets, making it the highest grossing show ever at that venue, a record previously held by the Rolling Stones since 2005.

It was reported by Billboard that The Chromatica Ball earned $28.3 million from six shows in July in Europe, $72.6 million during the North American leg, and $11.5 million from two shows in Japan in September. For all US shows, $1 from each ticket sold was donated to Born This Way Foundation. Gaga maximized her average audience, with 41,700 tickets per night, up 127% from her previous best of 18,400 on The Born This Way Ball. In average revenue, the tour was up 190% to a pace of $5.6 million, passing the Joanne World Tour's $1.9 million. With twenty shows, it became her highest-grossing tour in a decade, and marked the third $100 million-grossing tour of her career, following The Monster Ball and The Born This Way Ball.

== Political commentary ==
On select dates in North America and Japan, Gaga added "Angel Down" to the setlist (from her 2016 album, Joanne), a track which was inspired by the death of Trayvon Martin, and further described by the singer as a song about America. Before performing the song, she addressed different topics which are under debate in the United States. On most dates, she talked about fighting for reproductive rights, after the overturning of Roe v. Wade removed the constitutional right to abortion. In Hershey, she opened the song by saying: "This is for everyone who has to worry about their body. I know you came to the concert to have fun. But some people will die during childbirth, and some people will get raped, and they can’t have those kids." In Atlanta, she dedicated the song "to the safety of all people in Georgia", and addressed "anybody that can bear children". Her performance in Texas came three months after the Robb Elementary School shooting. She dedicated the song to victims of gun violence, "as a prayer to keep the people safe so we don't have to see any angels down". Here Gaga also acknowledged Texas's status as a swing state, and expressed her hope that even though the state has a "purple, purple heart", it will go into the Democratic direction. She added: "Maybe I brought this up and you're thinking, 'This is not for me, I do not want to talk about this right now,' and you may not agree but guess what? I don't know that this is about what you believe. This is about keeping people safe so sometimes we have to put aside what we believe."

In Washington D.C., Gaga dedicated "The Edge of Glory" to "every woman who now has to worry about her body if she gets pregnant", and added that she prays "that this country will speak up. That we will stick together and not stop until it’s right." Earlier in the D.C. show, before performing "Born This Way", she also addressed same-sex marriage, and said: "They better not try to mess with gay marriage in this country!"

== Set list ==
This set list is from the July 21, 2022, concert in Stockholm. It is not intended to represent all concerts for the tour.

Prelude

1. "Bad Romance" (preceded by an intro containing elements of "Fugue No. 24")
2. "Just Dance"
3. "Poker Face"

Act I

4. "Alice" (preceded by an intro containing elements of "Chromatica I")
5. "Replay"
6. "Monster"

Act II

7. "911" (preceded by an intro containing elements of "Chromatica II")
8. "Sour Candy"
9. "Telephone"
10. "LoveGame" (contains elements of "John Wayne")

Act III

11. "Babylon" (preceded by an intro containing elements of "Chromatica III")
12. "Free Woman"
13. "Born This Way"

Act IV

14. "Shallow"
15. "Always Remember Us This Way"
16. "The Edge of Glory"
17. "1000 Doves"
18. "Fun Tonight"
19. "Enigma"

Finale

20. "Stupid Love"
21. "Rain on Me"

Encore

22. "Hold My Hand"

=== Notes ===
- "1000 Doves" and "Fun Tonight" were added to the setlist for the Stockholm and subsequent shows on July 21, 2022.
- "The Edge of Glory" was not performed during the London show on July 29, 2022.
- Starting from August 23, 2022, Gaga replaced "1000 Doves" with "Angel Down".
- The final show in Miami Gardens had to be paused during "Angel Down" due to adverse weather conditions. The remainder of the show was ultimately cancelled later in the night.

== Concert film ==
=== Background and release ===
Promotional poster for the concert film by Max

The show on September 10, 2022, in Los Angeles was recorded for a then unknown project. Gaga tweeted after the concert: "52,000 people. Sold out. 30 cameras pointed at you and one take". In June 2023, she confirmed that she had been working on The Chromatica Ball concert film. She explained that the project was developed alongside several other commitments, including completing the filming of Joker: Folie à Deux (2024), while also taking time alone to focus on healing.

On May 8, 2024, Gaga announced the release date on social media, which then premiered on HBO and Max on May 25, with the title Gaga Chromatica Ball. Two days before its online debut, Gaga also held a premiere screening for select fans in Los Angeles. The event included exhibits displaying costumes and props from the tour in addition to a Q&A session with Gaga. The release marked her second collaboration with HBO following the network's 2011 broadcast of Lady Gaga Presents the Monster Ball Tour: At Madison Square Garden; executive vice president Nina Rosenstein said they were "thrilled" to work with her again.

Gaga both directed and produced the film with Arthur Fogel and John Janick acting as executive producers. It includes every performance from the show in Los Angeles and concludes with Gaga teasing the release of new music as a snippet of a then-unknown song (Note: Later identified as "Shadow of a Man" (2025).) plays and "LG7 Gaga returns" flashes on the screen. The performances are presented with a dynamic visual style featuring moving cameras and rapid editing with deliberate glitch effects that, according to one journalist, evoke horror media such as American Horror Story.

In posts on social media, Gaga described the film as documenting a period of intense creativity surrounding the tour, highlighting its fashion, choreography and music, and said she hoped viewers would "feel seen" when watching it. She also shared that she spent extensive time in the editing room shaping the film, describing it as a personal project created as a gift for her fans.

=== Critical reception ===
Gaga Chromatica Ball was well-received by critics and gained several award nominations, including for Best Variety Series or Special at the Astra TV Awards, Best Contemporary Make-Up in a Television Special, One-Hour or More Live Program Series at the Make-Up Artists and Hair Stylists Guild Awards, and Favorite On Screen at the iHeartRadio Music Awards.

On the review aggregator website Rotten Tomatoes, 100% of 5 critics' reviews are positive. Writing for The Daily Beast, Coleman Spilde complimented the special, stating that "it's an exhilarating watch from start to finish" that shows refinement of "Gaga's big, offbeat ideas". Spilde singled out the performances of "Sour Candy" and "Replay" as "particularly fun to watch" and complimented Gaga's ability to make her older hits like "Just Dance" and "Poker Face" sound "fresh" within the show. Joey Nolfi with Entertainment Weekly called the special "bonkers, brash, and unabashedly pop" and felt that the inclusion of the tour's interludes clarified the overall storyline and thematic elements of both Chromatica and the tour. He singled out "Sour Candy" for praise and described the piano segment as "powerful". Johnny Loftus of Decider opined that Gaga Chromatica Ball is "a thrilling, maximalist concert film that activates its spectacle through the sheer force of Lady Gaga as a live performer." Loftus also praised the film's editing and elaborate costume changes. He found particular merit in the piano segment, particularly Gaga's messages to LGBTQ+ fans during "Born This Way" and her performances of "Shallow" and "Always Remember Us This Way", which he felt brought a sense of intimacy to the stadium show.

== Tour dates ==
List of concertsshowing date, city, country, venue, attendance and revenue
Date (2022)	City	Country	Venue	Attendance	Revenue
July 17	Düsseldorf	Germany	Merkur Spiel-Arena	45,722 / 45,722	$4,027,543
July 21	Stockholm	Sweden	Friends Arena	34,934 / 34,934	$3,540,732
July 24 (Note: The concert of July 24, 2022, in Saint-Denis was previously scheduled for July 24, 2020, and July 25, 2021.)	Saint-Denis (Note: Labelled as Paris in promotional material.)	France	Stade de France	78,866 / 78,866	$7,844,680
July 26	Arnhem	Netherlands	GelreDome	30,267 / 30,267	$3,250,525
July 29 (Note: The concert of July 29, 2022, in London was previously scheduled for July 30, 2020, and July 30, 2021.)	London	England	Tottenham Hotspur Stadium	86,508 / 86,508	$9,638,047
July 30	London	England	Tottenham Hotspur Stadium	86,508 / 86,508	$9,638,047
August 6 (Note: The concert of August 6, 2022, in Toronto was previously scheduled for August 9, 2020, and August 16, 2021.)	Toronto	Canada	Rogers Centre	47,864 / 47,864	$5,080,623
August 8	Washington, D.C.	United States	Nationals Park	35,920 / 35,920	$4,885,864
August 11 (Note: The concert of August 11, 2022, in East Rutherford was previously scheduled for August 19, 2020, and August 19, 2021.)	East Rutherford (Note: Labelled as New York City in promotional material.)	United States	MetLife Stadium	53,155 / 53,155	$8,412,348
August 15 (Note: The concert of August 15, 2022, in Chicago was previously scheduled for August 14, 2020, and August 27, 2021.)	Chicago	United States	Wrigley Field	43,019 / 43,019	$6,905,799
August 19 (Note: The concert of August 19, 2022, in Boston was previously scheduled for August 5, 2020, and August 7, 2021.)	Boston	United States	Fenway Park	38,267 / 38,267	$5,704,636
August 23	Arlington (Note: Labelled as Dallas in promotional material.)	United States	Globe Life Field	38,056 / 38,056	$5,365,094
August 26	Cumberland (Note: Labelled as Atlanta in promotional material.)	United States	Truist Park	36,140 / 36,140	$5,392,573
August 28	Hershey	United States	Hersheypark Stadium	30,678 / 30,678	$4,277,892
September 3	Tokorozawa (Note: Labelled as Tokyo in promotional material.)	Japan	Belluna Dome	66,706 / 66,706	$11,442,626
September 4	Tokorozawa	Japan	Belluna Dome	66,706 / 66,706	$11,442,626
September 8	San Francisco	United States	Oracle Park	38,275 / 38,275	$7,387,434
September 10	Los Angeles	United States	Dodger Stadium	51,344 / 51,344	$9,355,562
September 13	Houston	United States	Minute Maid Park	33,779 / 33,779	$4,004,039
September 17	Miami Gardens (Note: Labelled as Miami in promotional material.)	United States	Hard Rock Stadium	44,298 / 44,298	$5,878,508
Total				833,798 / 833,798 (100%)	$112,394,525

== Personnel ==
Adapted from the Gaga Chromatica Ball film credits.

Performer

- Lady Gaga – creator, director, vocals

Band

- Tim Stewart – guitar
- Ricky Tillo – guitar
- Chris Johnson – drums
- Jonny Drummond – bass guitar
- Brockett Parsons – keyboards
- Michael Bearden – musical director

Dancers

- Madison Alvarado
- Morgan Geraghty
- Jacob Gonzales
- Trinity Inay
- Christopher Jensen
- Alaïa Kutyrey
- Grayson McGuire
- Ian McKenzie
- Michael Pesko
- Kyle Ponte
- Victor Rojas
- Jazz Smith
- Joseph Szekula
- Lindsay Taylor
- China Taylor
- Aisha Yamamoto

Creative and production

- Richy Jackson – choreographer, show co-director
- LeRoy A. Bennett – production and lighting designer
- Travis Brothers – creative direction, show design
- Isha Dipika Walia – creative direction, show design
- Bryan Rivera – creative direction, show design
- Lewis James – creative direction, show design
- Nick Knight – interstitial films direction and screen content
- Sandra Amador – fashion director
- Tom Eerebout – fashion director
- Nicola Formichetti – fashion director
- Natali Germanotta – creative consultant

Management and styling

- Bobby Campbell – artist manager
- Frederic Aspiras – hair stylist
- Sarah Tanno – makeup artist
- Don Lawrence – vocal coach

Concert film

- Lady Gaga – director
- Kerry Asmussen – multi-camera director
- Chase Smith – director of photography
- Tom Colbourne – producer
- Michelle An – producer
- Chelsea Dodson – producer
- Bobby Campbell – executive producer
- Arthur Fogel – executive producer
- John Janick – executive producer
- Steve Berman – executive producer
- Sam Wrench – creative producer
- Dom Whitworth – lead editor
- Guy Harding – editor
- Rupa Rathod – editor
- Ben Wainwright-Pearce – editor
- Reg Wrench – editor
- Bill Malina – music recording and mix engineer
- BloodPop – additional original music
- Burns – additional original music

== See also ==
- List of highest-grossing concert tours by women
