= Angel Down (song) =

2016 song by Lady Gaga

Song by Lady Gaga

from the album Joanne
- Released: October 21, 2016
- Studio: Shangri-La Studios (Malibu, CA); Pink Duck Studios (Burbank, CA); Electric Lady Studios (New York City, NY); Woodshed Studios (Malibu, CA) (work tape)
- Length: 3:49; 2:19 (work tape)
- Label: Streamline; Interscope
- Songwriters: Stefani Germanotta; Nadir Khayat
- Producers: Mark Ronson; Lady Gaga; BloodPop; RedOne (Note: RedOne is credited as a co-producer on the "work tape" version only.)

Audio video
- "Angel Down" on YouTube

"Angel Down" is a song by American singer-songwriter Lady Gaga. It serves as the concluding track on the standard edition of her fifth studio album, Joanne (2016). Influenced by the killing of Trayvon Martin in 2012, it was written by Gaga and her long-time collaborator RedOne, during the initial recording sessions of the album in 2015; he also produced its work tape version. In late 2015, she played "Angel Down" to Mark Ronson, who later produced the official rendition of the track, along with BloodPop. It is a torch song, as well as protest song against shootings of African Americans in the United States. The piano ballad also touches on topics of social media.

Critical reception towards "Angel Down" was mixed – some journalists found the track a beautiful end to the album and appreciated its message, while others deemed it well-intentioned but otherwise a weak offering. After debuting the song on the New York Times/T Gala, Gaga performed it during her two concert series in support of Joanne, the Dive Bar Tour (2016) and the Joanne World Tour (2017–2018). In 2022, she added "Angel Down" to the setlist for select dates of The Chromatica Ball, interpolating political statements to the performance.

== Background and development ==
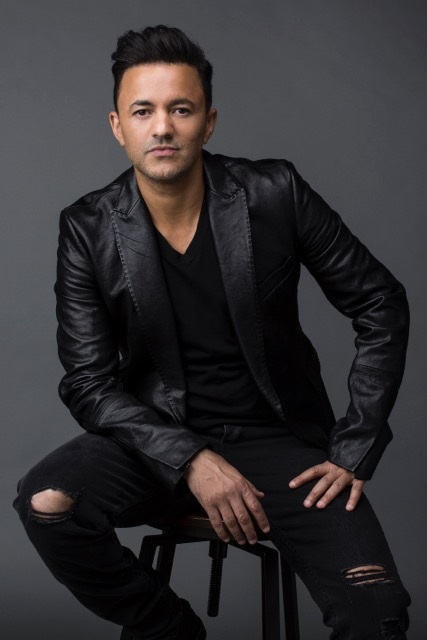
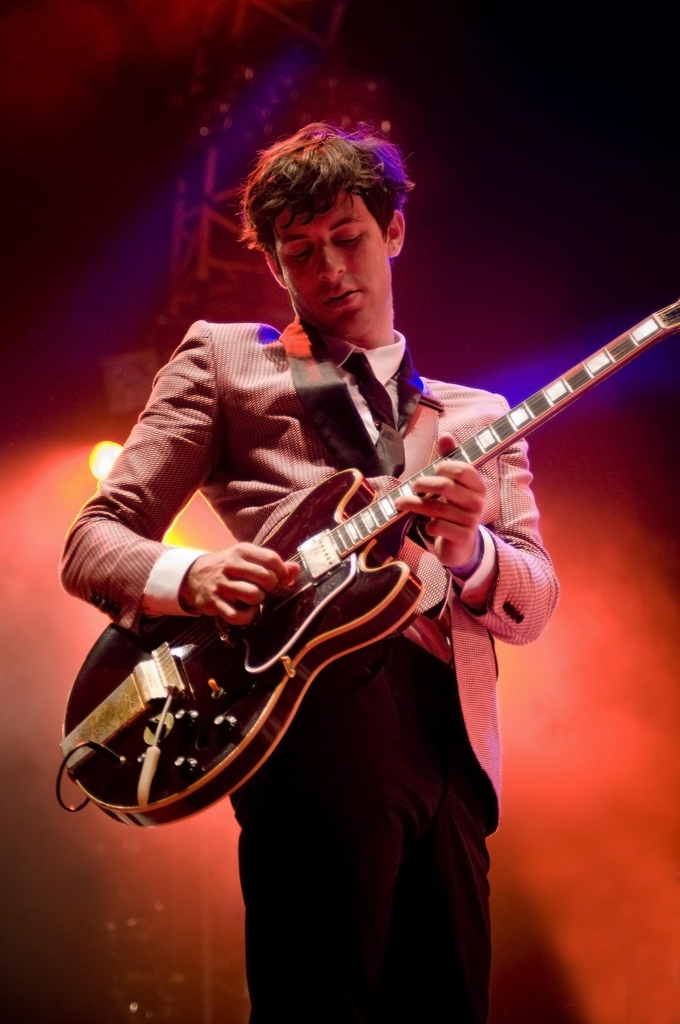
"Angel Down" was written during the initial sessions for Gaga's fifth studio album. The track was co-written and originally co-produced by RedOne (left), but after meeting Mark Ronson (right), Gaga finalized the song with him instead.

In the first few months of the Joanne's (2016) inception, Lady Gaga was seen collaborating with long-time producer RedOne, as well as new collaborators like Giorgio Moroder and Nile Rodgers. "Angel Down" is the only song featured on the album that was penned with RedOne. Its acoustic version, officially released with the moniker "work tape", (Note: "Angel Down (work tape)" was released as the last track on the deluxe edition of Joanne.) was written and produced in 2015, with Lady Gaga handling piano and vocals, while RedOne played on guitar and also programmed the track. This rendition of the song was recorded in Woodshed Studios in Malibu, California by Trevor Muzzy and Alekes Von Korff. When looking for more collaborators for the project, Gaga encountered Mark Ronson in a London studio, where she played him "Angel Down", which was described by him as "quite moving". They finished the new version's production alongside BloodPop, who played keyboards and drums. Ronson added Mellotron strings to the song. It was recorded by David "Squirell" Covell and Joshua Blair in Shangri-La, while the Pink Duck Studios session was taken by Blair and assisted by Justin Smith. Another take, done in Electric Lady Studios, was recorded by Blair with the help of Barry McCready.

== Inspiration and composition ==
"Angel Down" was influenced by the killing of Trayvon Martin in 2012. During the interview with New Zealand DJ Zane Lowe, she compared murders of young African-Americans to an epidemic, saying she is overwhelmed by the apathy of society on the issue. The singer asked "How can I not say something?", since making "an album about twerking [her] ass off in the club" felt "empty" and "irrelevant" to her. During her 2022 tour, The Chromatica Ball, Gaga further referred to "Angel Down" as a "song about America".

"Angel Down"
A 15-second snippet of "Angel Down" instrumental built off "sad" Mellotron and "backward loops".

Its final version is the concluding track of Joanne's standard edition. Described as a torch song with a "lush sonic pallet", it is a piano-driven ballad touching on subjects of religion and the US shootings, featuring "backward loops and dreamy psychedelic flourishes". The Daily Telegraph's Neil McCormick wrote that it has "mournfully elegant melody and quasi-religious save-the-nation sentiments", referring to the lyric "I'm a believer / Where are leaders?". It includes Gaga's "vulnerable" vocals complemented by a "gentle" production and "sadly" played Mellotron. A protest song, "Angel Down" begins with Gaga stating "I confess I am lost / In the age of the social / On our knees, take a test / To be lovin' and grateful", alluding to the ongoing indifference towards racism issues to social media. As the song progresses, she reveals her confusion to the people's apathy to the death of an "angel" as she sings in the chorus "Shots were fired on the street / By the church where we used to meet / Angel down, angel down / But the people just stood around". The song was compared to the work of Elvis Presley, Celine Dion, and Jewel.

== Critical reception ==
Writing for The Observer, Michael Cragg found "Angel Down" an "intoxicating lament that twinkles and wheezes in equal measure". Richard S. He of Vulture wrote that the song is "a far cry from the fearless optimism of Gaga's past albums. But it carries an important message: to not turn away from suffering." NME's Emily Mackay also praised the song for its "simple, warm and vital message", urging "to take care of each other in a cruel world". Daniel Welsh from HuffPost opined that "Angel Down" is a better way to end the album than "Just Another Day", (Note: "Just Another Day" is the final original song of the deluxe edition of Joanne.) hence it "forc[es] the listener to end thinking about something important". Luke Winstanley of Clash described it as a "beautifully sombre closer", while Kevin Fallon from The Daily Beast said it is a "solid torch song to wind down the album". For Digital Spy's Lewis Corner, it is "a beautiful ending to the album, hearing a vulnerable vocal from Gaga over a gentle production." At Contactmusic.com, Eoin Hanlon thought that "Angel Down" is one of the "moment[s] where her vocals are at their best" on the album. Writing for Los Angeles Times, Mikael Wood labeled the song as "lugubrious". In a review published by Spin, Rich Juzwiak contemplated that the track is an "oblique enough to avoid revealing itself as the Trayvon Martin tribute that it was conceived as", however according to him, it "could have been much heavier handed".

On a more critical note, Pitchfork writer Amanda Petrusich described Gaga's attempt of talking about "serious concerns" in "Angel Down" as "clumsy if not performative". Adam White of The Independent found it a "well-intentioned if forgettable ode to political confusion". Similarly, Billboard's Andrew Unterberger felt along with another Joanne track, "Come to Mama", Gaga's "well-intentioned anthems of social conscience [...] land somewhat flat". Chicago Tribune's Greg Kot also criticized the social commentary-filled lyrics on "Come to Mama" and "Angel Down". Jezebel writer Bobby Finger called "Angel Down" the "album's biggest problem", saying: "it's hard to listen to Gaga scorn those who did nothing after Martin's death four years after the fact. It all feels like a vigil held too late — one populated by cardboard cutouts and battery-operated flickering lights, not grieving humans holding candles. I don't doubt her compassion, just her intentions." The Atlantic's Spencer Kornhaber was more keen of the "work tape" version, calling it "by far the best product of this Gaga era"; he however heavily criticized the album version by Ronson and BloodPop, thinking "the song has become strangely mannered, gilded in harps and forfeiting the original's searing vocals".

== Live performances ==
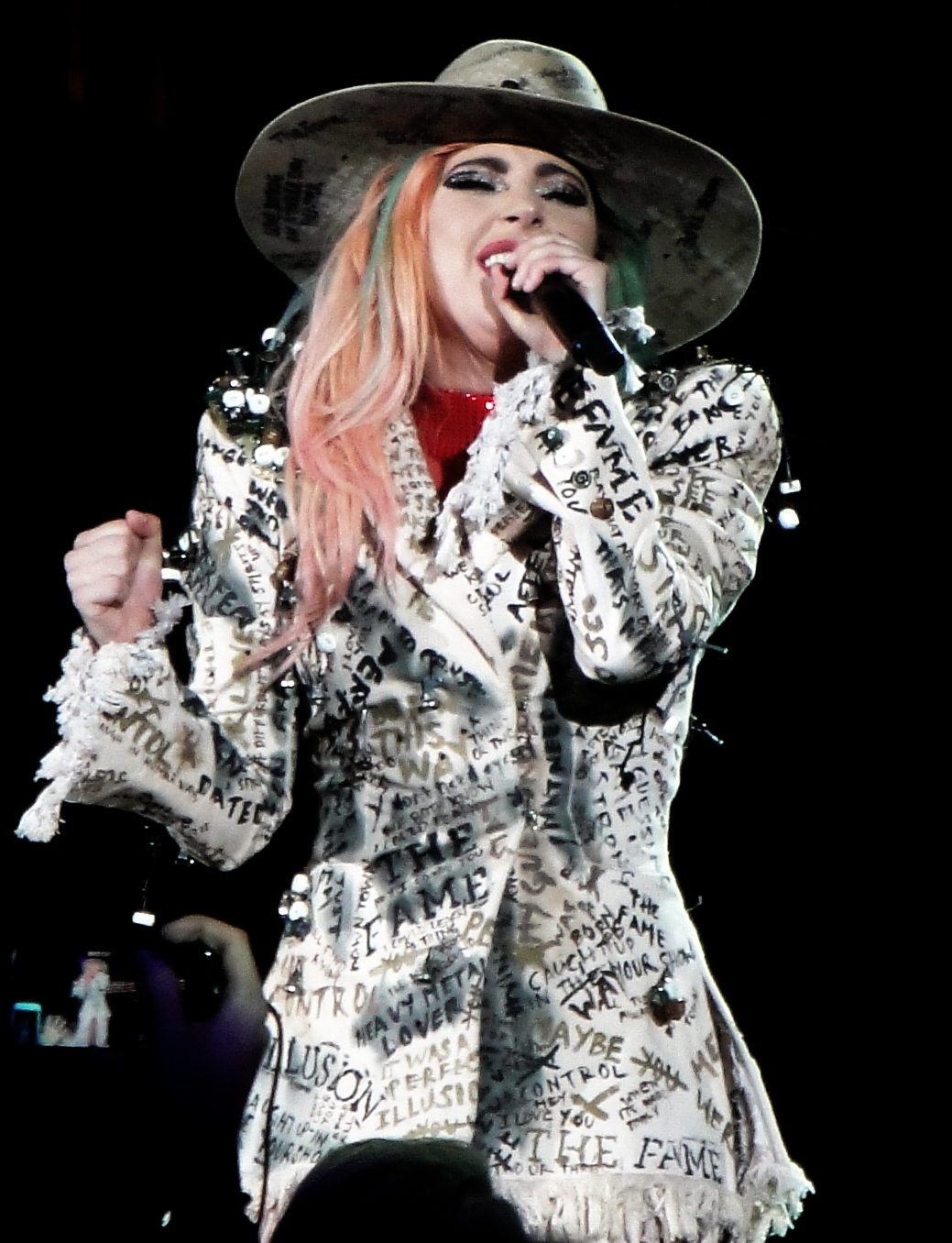
Gaga performing "Angel Down" during the Joanne World Tour

Gaga debuted "Angel Down" live on New York Times/T Gala on October 19, 2016, where she was honored for her contribution to the world of fashion. The following day, she performed the song at The Bitter End, in New York City, as part of her Dive Bar Tour, a promotional concert tour in support of Joanne. After her main set was over, she climbed on the bar's roof to sing it and "Joanne" to the crowd who gathered outside, as they were unable to get in due to the limited capacity of the venue. Before singing the track at the Los Angeles stop of the tour, Gaga called for peace at a "tumultuous" time in American politics, referring to the 2016 United States presidential election. She added the line "Trayvon Angel" to the song's outro. "Angel Down" was performed alongside "Come to Mama" at presidential candidate Hillary Clinton's final campaign stop in Raleigh, North Carolina.

"Angel Down" was of part the set list for Gaga's fifth headlining concert tour, the Joanne World Tour (2017–2018). She performed it while wearing a fringe blazer and a wide-brimmed hat. For the duration of the song, Gaga was lift up into the air on a mobile platform, which was slowly descended from the ceiling. She dedicated "Angel Down" to "everyone we lost this year." Jonathan Dean of The Times found the performance "incredibly moving". Because of the prior song of the setlist, "Paparazzi", Alex Stedman of Variety thought the sequence had an "almost dizzying tonal change".

In 2022, Gaga embarked on The Chromatica Ball, where she sang "Angel Down" on select dates in North America and Japan, as the sole track from Joanne on the setlist. She performed it on the piano while wearing a black and lavender latex bodysuit. Her piano was covered in tree branches, appearing "as something growing organically out of gnarly forest limbs and trunks", according to Variety. Preceding the song, she addressed different topics which were under debate in the United States, including gun violence and abortion rights. Gaga's piano was illuminated by blue lights for "Angel Down" at her Texas show, where she expressed hope that the "purple [state] is gonna go blue".

In 2025, Gaga performed "Angel Down" as a surprise song on piano at The Mayhem Ball tour's show in Antwerp, Belgium.

== Credits and personnel ==
These credits are adapted from the liner notes of Joanne.

=== Official version ===
Recording locations

- Recorded at Shangri-La Studios (Malibu, California), Pink Duck Studios (Burbank, California), and Electric Lady Studios (New York City)
- Mixed at Atomic Studios (New York City)
- Mastered at Sterling Sound Studios (New York City)

Personnel

- Lady Gaga – vocals, piano, songwriting, production
- RedOne – songwriting
- Mark Ronson – Mellotron strings, production
- BloodPop – drums, keyboards, production
- David "Squirell" Covell – recording
- Joshua Blair – recording
- Justin Smith – recording assistance
- Barry McCrady – recording assistance
- Ben Babtie – mixing
- Tom Coyne – mastering
- Randy Merrill – mastering

=== Work tape version ===
Recording locations

- Recorded at Woodshed (Malibu, California)
- Mixed at RedOne Studios (Los Angeles)
- Mastered at Sterling Sound Studios (New York City)

Personnel

- Lady Gaga – vocals, piano, songwriting, production
- RedOne – guitar, songwriting, production, programming, mixing
- Trevor Muzzy – recording
- Alekes Von Korff – recording
- T.I Jakke – mixing
- Tom Coyne – mastering
- Randy Merrill – mastering

== Charts ==
Weekly chart performance for "Angel Down"
| Chart (2016) | Peak position |
|---|---|
| UK Singles (Official Charts Company) | 152 |
