= Joanne (album) =

2016 studio album by Lady Gaga

Studio album by Lady Gaga
- Released: October 21, 2016
- Recorded: Late 2015 – September 17, 2016
- Studios: Pink Duck (Burbank); GenPop Laboratory, Green Oak, Vox (Los Angeles); Dragonfly, Gypsy Palace, Shangri-La (Malibu); NegroNododle Entertainment (New South Wales); Diamond Mine, Electric Lady (New York City); The Farm, Zelig, 123 (London)
- Genres: Dance-pop; soft rock; Americana
- Length: 39:05
- Labels: Streamline; Interscope
- Producers: Lady Gaga; Mark Ronson; BloodPop; Emile Haynie; Kevin Parker

Lady Gaga chronology
Cheek to Cheek (2014)	Joanne (2016)	A Star Is Born (2018)

Singles from Joanne
- 1. "Perfect Illusion" Released: September 9, 2016; 2. "Million Reasons" Released: October 29, 2016; 3. "Joanne" Released: December 22, 2017

Joanne is the fourth solo studio album by American singer-songwriter Lady Gaga and her fifth overall. (Note: Joanne is Gaga's fifth studio album when including her collaborative album with Tony Bennett, Cheek to Cheek. Occasionally, her debut album The Fame (2008) and its reissue The Fame Monster (2009) are counted separately, which would make Joanne her sixth solo album.) It was released on October 21, 2016, by Streamline and Interscope Records. Gaga, Mark Ronson and BloodPop handled its production. Other collaborators include Kevin Parker, Emile Haynie, Jeff Bhasker and Josh Homme. Musically, Joanne is a stripped-down, dance-pop, soft rock and Americana record with country elements, with a focus on Gaga's vocals. Lyrically, the album delves into the theme of family and life's emotions; the death of her aunt, Joanne Stefani Germanotta, deeply influenced the record. The singer's experience acting on the television series American Horror Story also influenced its creative process.

Joanne topped the album charts in Brazil, Mexico, and the United States while reaching the top five in Argentina, Australia, Belgium, Canada, the Czech Republic, Finland, Greece, Ireland, Italy, the Netherlands, New Zealand, Norway, Portugal, Scotland, Slovakia, Spain, Sweden, Switzerland, and the United Kingdom. Three singles were released: "Perfect Illusion", "Million Reasons" and the title track. "Perfect Illusion" was released as the album's lead single on September 9, 2016, and reached number one in France, while "Million Reasons" reached number four in the United States. A piano version of the title track was released to radio in selected territories as the album's third single. The album received generally favorable reviews from critics, who praised Gaga's musical direction, vocals, production and lyrical content. However, some critics found that the album lacked cohesiveness. Joanne was nominated for Best Pop Vocal Album at the 60th Annual Grammy Awards. "Million Reasons" and "Joanne" were nominated for Best Pop Solo Performance in separate years, for which the latter won the award.

The release and promotion of the album marked a softening of Gaga's image, who took on a more singer-songwriter oriented look in promotional materials, wearing a pink, wide-brimmed cowgirl hat, vintage denim and pastel colors, evoking the 1970s. She promoted the album with her Dive Bar Tour, a promotional concert in dive bars in the United States, and the Joanne World Tour, which began in August 2017 and ended in February 2018. Gaga also did some television appearances, and headlined the Super Bowl LI halftime show and the 2017 Coachella Festival. That same year, she released a documentary film, titled Gaga: Five Foot Two, showing the production of the album and her halftime performance.

== Background and development ==
Lady Gaga's third studio album Artpop was released in November 2013 to mixed reviews. It debuted atop the Billboard 200 chart, and had sold 2.5 million copies as of July 2014. Gaga split from her longtime manager Troy Carter in late 2013. By June 2014, she and new manager Bobby Campbell had joined Artist Nation, the artist management division of Live Nation Entertainment. Gaga confessed to NME that she had considered quitting music altogether because she felt depressed about herself and "wasn't able to see my own ability or my own talent". The ambivalent reception to Artpop, controversies surrounding the album and Born This Way (2011) and negative press reactions led Gaga's management to come up with an image change for her. Along with a more subdued appearance in the media, Gaga emphasized her vocal prowess. A tribute to the 50th anniversary of The Sound of Music at the 87th Academy Awards, where she sang a medley of songs from the film, was critically lauded. She and Tony Bennett also released Cheek to Cheek, an album of jazz duets, in September 2014 to generally favorable reviews. It debuted atop the Billboard 200, becoming Gaga's third consecutive number-one album in the United States, and won a Grammy Award for Best Traditional Pop Vocal Album.

Gaga also starred in American Horror Story: Hotel (2015–2016), the fifth season of the American anthology television series American Horror Story, winning a Golden Globe Award for Best Actress – Miniseries or Television Film. At the awards ceremony, the singer confirmed she would be releasing her fifth studio album later in 2016, and was working on the logistics and changing her image. Throughout most of 2015 and 2016, Gaga teased fans about the album's creative and recording processes on her social media accounts. She was seen collaborating with longtime producer RedOne, as well as new collaborators like Giorgio Moroder, Mark Ronson and Nile Rodgers.

== Writing and recording ==
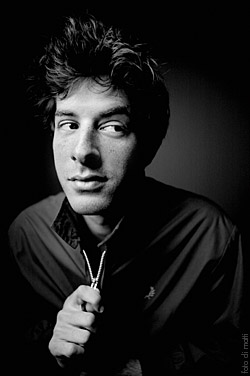
Mark Ronson (pictured) and Gaga served as the album's executive producers.

According to Gaga, she wanted "fans to be surprised [by the album] ... it's a wonderful, soul-searching experience. And it's very unlike [Artpop] in that way". In an interview with Billboard, producer RedOne said the singer was mentally in a "cleaner" state of mind, hearkening back to her earlier days, which he felt was beneficial. Gaga and Ronson served as Joanne's executive producers. The two grew up near each other on the Upper East Side of New York City, and had collaborated on Wale's song "Chillin" (2009). They reunited in late 2015, when Gaga presented the song "Angel Down" to Ronson at a studio in London. Later, the duo worked for six months in Rick Rubin's Shangri-La recording studio in Malibu, while he was between projects. On Gaga and Ronson's first day at Shangri-La, they wrote the song "Joanne". Ronson encouraged Gaga to "write [lyrics] about whatever was happening in her life or on her mind".

Recording continued until the album's final mastering session. Ronson described Gaga as closely involved in the recording process, saying that she was "happiest when she's sitting at a piano barking orders at the drummer". He later said that the music recorded with Gaga was "some of my favorite music I've really ever worked on. It's incredible – I love it. ... I can't wait until you can hear it because the music speaks for itself". Ronson also hinted at the involvement of Kevin Parker, frontman for the Australian psychedelic rock band Tame Impala, which BBC Music later confirmed.

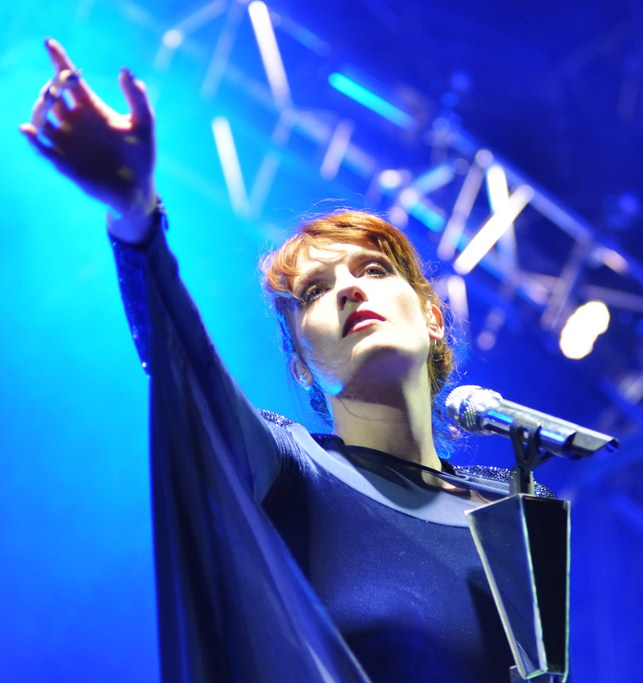
Florence Welch (pictured) is a featured vocalist on "Hey Girl".

Many prominent musicians make guest appearances on Joanne. Gaga invited Father John Misty to play drums on the record. Ronson invited Josh Homme to play guitar on the song "John Wayne" because of his work for the band Queens of the Stone Age; in addition, Homme drummed and was a co-producer. Ronson also invited Beck to collaborate on the album, resulting in the song "Dancin' in Circles". Gaga, a longtime fan of Beck's, was initially starstruck at working with him. Gaga and Florence Welch developed the concept of their duet, "Hey Girl", during a meeting at New York's Electric Lady Studios. According to Gaga, the song's theme demanded a female collaborator. She selected Welch, calling her "if not the best, one of the greatest vocalists in the world".

Ronson crafted the album's organic sound by recruiting musicians he had previously worked with on projects for Rufus Wainwright and Amy Winehouse. He credited producer BloodPop with bringing the album "into the modern era". During the album's production, Gaga collaborated with Elton John; their sessions resulted in a song titled "Room in My Heart", which did not make the album's final cut. In 2017, Gaga released her documentary film Gaga: Five Foot Two on Netflix, which included scenes of the singer and Ronson shot during the album's recording sessions.

=== Themes and influences ===
"Returning to your family and where you came from, and your history ... this is what makes you strong. It's not looking out that's going to do that—it's looking in ... Joanne is a progression for me. It was about going into the studio and forgetting that I was famous."

— Gaga on the album's influences

Family is an underlying theme on Joanne. Gaga explained that the album "goes through all of [life]'s emotions". While crafting it, she envisioned a girl in the middle of the country, who would understand the singer's lyrics and find a human connection. To achieve that, Gaga said in an interview with E! that she decided to encompass an assortment of genres, including "[crossing] between country and funk, pop, dance, rock, electronic music, [and] folk". The death of Gaga's aunt, Joanne Germanotta, contributed to the emotional content of the songs, as well as to their lyrics. Along with identity, feelings such as loss, heartbreak, frustration, desire and nostalgia also influenced the album. The singer clarified that with Joanne she wanted to go "out into the world ... bringing with me its deepest stories that I have of my life and turning them into songs that I hope will touch people in a deep and meaningful way about their own lives and their own stories".

The singer's experience working on American Horror Story influenced Joanne's creative process. Gaga said: "I have returned to something I've believed in so much, which is the art of darkness." Being on the show also impacted her vocals. She explained that she would "listen" more to the music and then write. She added that Joanne would talk less about her painful time during the Artpop era and would have more clarity: "Now I'm thinking more about what it is I want to say and what I want to leave on Earth. It's less an expression of all my pain." The album became an outlet for the singer to relieve herself of the "pain and anguish" she was feeling.

Other influences came from the men in Gaga's life, including her father Joe Germanotta and ex-fiancé Taylor Kinney. She said that using her "rebellious spirit", she wanted to understand the different relationships she had gone through, saying that Joanne was not a "sad album. It's an album that is very revealing of me as a woman." According to Kevin Fallon of The Daily Beast: "The act of being Lady Gaga had drowned out the brilliant music, and the importance of Lady Gaga had somehow muddied the simple pleasure of being her fan: It was her authenticity, in all of its strangeness and lofty artistic pursuit, that spoke to us. That seemed to have gone missing." He felt that with Joanne, Gaga was able to eliminate that redundancy and present herself as an "evolved performer", who could "lay bare" emotions in the songs, rather than "mask" them in electronic music beats.

== Title and packaging ==
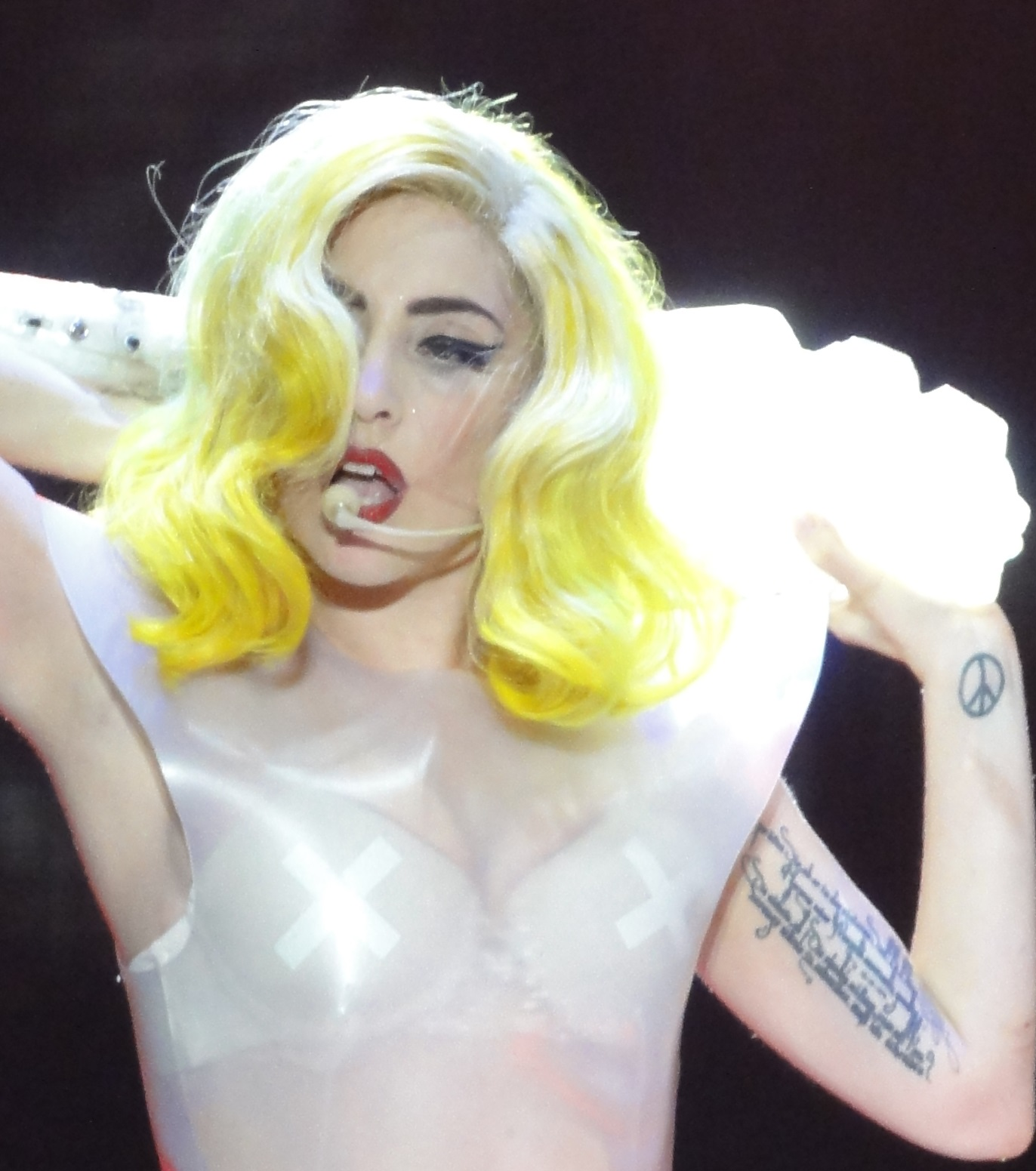
The tattoo on Gaga's left biceps displays the date her aunt Joanne died between lines from a poem by Rainer Maria Rilke.

Gaga named the album after Joanne Stefani Germanotta, her father's sister. She died on December 18, 1974, at age 19, due to complications arising from lupus. Gaga, whose middle name is Joanne (Stefani Joanne Angelina Germanotta), recognized her aunt's death had had a profound effect on her family and her work. The booklet in her debut album, The Fame (2008), contained a poem titled For a Moment written by Joanne.

Gaga credits Joanne with helping her overcome addiction problems, and dedicated The Fame Ball Tour (2009) to her. The singer tattooed the date of Joanne's death on her left biceps, "between lines of a verse from a poem by Rainer Maria Rilke". The singer's parents opened a restaurant called Joanne Trattoria in New York in 2012. Gaga has often said that although she never met her, Joanne was "one of the most important figures in my life". After she wrote the song "Joanne" with Ronson, they decided to use the name as the album's title as a tribute to her aunt.

Along with revealing the album's title, Gaga also unveiled the cover artwork. It consists of an image of the singer's left profile, with her wearing a pink, wide-brimmed hat, against a blue background. The hat was designed by milliner Gladys Tamez, who revealed it was another source of inspiration behind the overall direction of Joanne. The milliner explained to The Daily Beast that one of the hats was inspired by English singer Marianne Faithfull. She said that "Gaga was the first to ever request this hat in pink", stating it is the singer's favorite color. Tamez also named it "Lady Joanne" and added that Gaga had her change the shape, color and the ribbon on the hat. While designing the cover and the overall image, Tamez and Gaga spoke of using more pastel colors, inspired by the aesthetics of the 1970s.

Dominique Redfearn of Billboard noted that the cover appeared simpler compared to those for Born This Way (2011) and Artpop (2013). Billboard's Andrew Unterberger described it as "thoughtfully composed", adding it was an indication that the album's music was much more straightforward than her earlier work. The standard version of the album contains 11 songs; the deluxe edition includes three additional tracks – two bonus songs and a demo. The booklet includes Gaga and her father's pictures, and Joanne's driving license and handwriting. Gaga felt it was "nice to include family heirlooms that carry meaning to me still today", as well as "a Polaroid of me and [Ronson] in the studio".

== Music and lyrics ==
Journalists have described Joanne as a dance-pop, soft rock and Americana album, with elements of country music. According to Rolling Stone, Gaga "didn't give much thought to genre" while creating Joanne, which ranges "from the dance-rock of [its] lead single[,] 'Perfect Illusion'[,] to the introspective country songwriting of the title track". Gaga stated she professed a fascination with all aspects of country music, which in turn influenced the album. In terms of production and composition, Joanne continued the "stripped-down" approach to music Gaga had taken following Artpop, emphasizing her vocals and the songwriting. Gaga told Rolling Stone that the tracks consisted of "stories about my family, my sister, my father and his sister. My mom's family. My relationships with men, my failures".

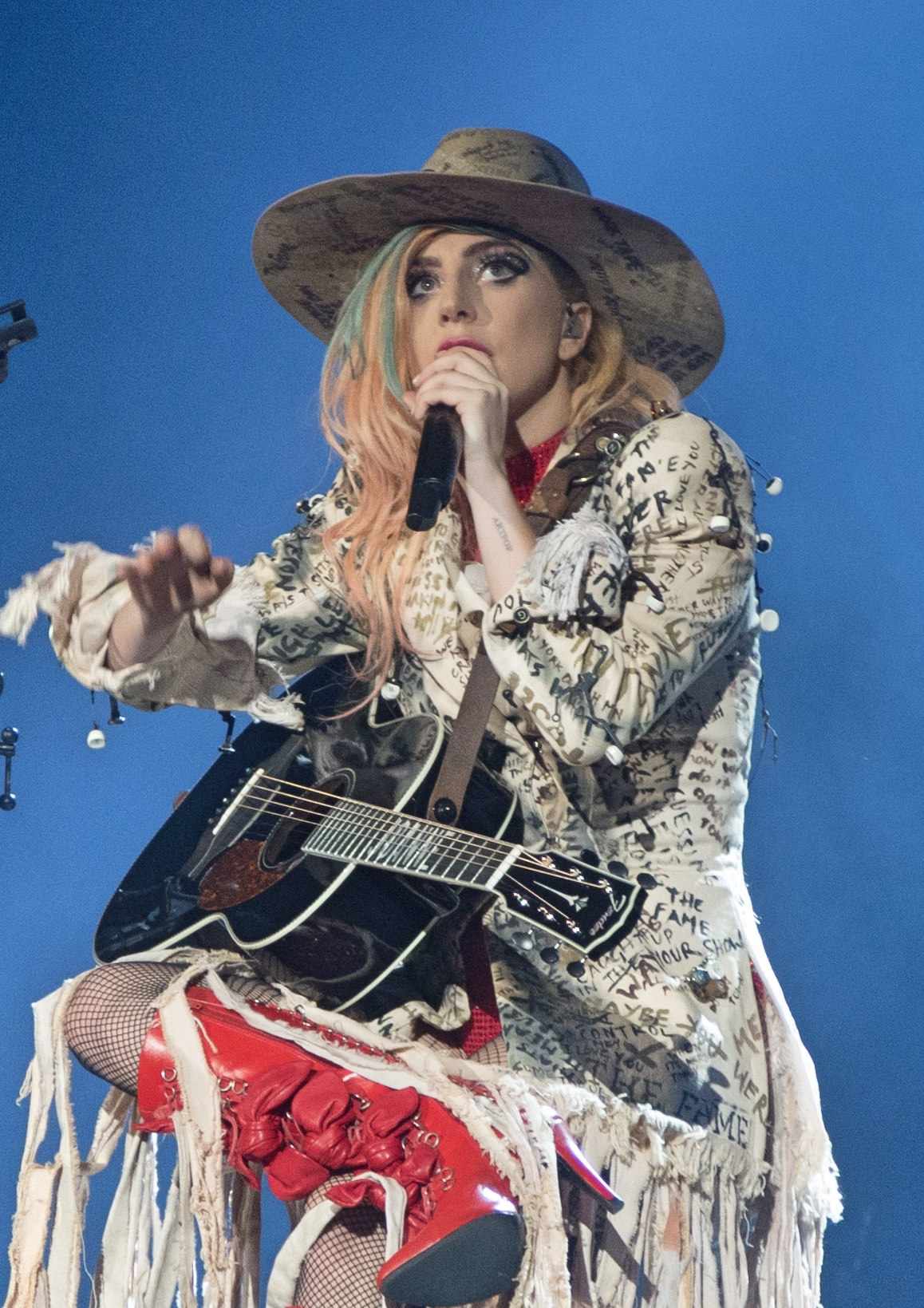
Gaga performing the title track on the Joanne World Tour. The song marks the first time the general tempo of the album drops. The singer called it the "true heart and soul of the record".

Joe Lynch of Billboard described Joanne as "a stylistically eclectic collection of swaggering rock, introspective ballads and soulful, danceable grooves". It opens with the track "Diamond Heart". Hearkening back to her earlier works, this autobiographical song talks about Gaga's time as a go-go dancer in New York. "Diamond Heart" varies from a moody vibe in the verses, to a drum-oriented pre-chorus, and finally a rock-EDM chorus, with Homme playing guitar. The second track, "A-Yo", has "touches of country", and is reminiscent of the music played in dive bars, with double hand claps. Lyrically, it is a metaphor for having sex. The repetition of the same two chords in the song's instrumentation is complemented by BloodPop's "background shouts and synth" elements. As the title track starts, the general tempo drops. Accompanied by an acoustic guitar and minimal percussion, Gaga sings lyrics about her late aunt Joanne. The singer described the track as "the true heart and soul of the record".

The electronic "John Wayne" is more "tongue-in-cheek" lyrically, with Gaga including "cowboy references" in the lyrics: "I just love a cowboy, I know it's bad, but I'm, like, can I just hang off the back of your horse and can you go a little faster?". Gaga's vocals are accompanied by Homme's guitar, and the track talks about her constant need to chase wild men, with comparisons to actor John Wayne. The Beck-composed track "Dancin' in Circles" is a pop song with influences of reggae, consisting of a dance beat, a spoken-word bridge and lyrics about having a good time by oneself. It was described by Billboard' Lynch as an "ode to masturbation". The lyrics find Gaga, dancing alone late at night, "fantasizing about a past lover" and masturbating: "I lay around, touch myself to pass the time / I feel down, I wish you were mine".

'Perfect Illusion'
An 18-second sample of "Perfect Illusion", which illustrates the chorus of the song. The track presents a guitar-and-vocal breakdown, as well is a mixture of guitar and "grumbling" synths.

According to Mark Savage of BBC Music, "Perfect Illusion" is a disco-rock song, composed around a "building chord sequence", which he felt leads to a "compelling sense of urgency". The singer's vocals are kept "raw" and "untreated", "eschewing Auto-Tune". The composition consists of "pulsing verses" and a "guitar-and-vocals breakdown before the final chorus", where Gaga sings the title multiple times. Around the two-minute mark, there is a key change for the final chorus. In "Million Reasons" Gaga talks about love which does not last, uttering "several variations" of the title in the verses. The composition consists of a simple, country-oriented piano and guitar instrumentation. In the chorus Gaga sings, "You're giving me a million reasons to let you go / You're giving me a million reasons to quit the show". Tom Rasmussen of Vice feels "Million Reasons" has the strongest country music influence of all the songs on Joanne.

"Sinner's Prayer" is a mixture of country music, R&B and pop. The "Father John Misty-assisted track" finds a "vulnerable" Gaga wanting her man to love her true self. The lyric, "Her love for him ain't cheap / But it breaks just like a knockoff piece from Fulton Street" references Fulton Street in Manhattan, New York, where cheap trinkets are available. In the 1970s-inspired "Come to Mama", Gaga sings about loving and accepting one another in an affected voice, elongating her vowel enunciation. The song has biblical references, with Gaga alluding to both the Old and New Testaments. The lyric about "a forty-day flood" references Noah's Ark, while "stop throwin' stones at your sisters and your brothers" is taken from one of Jesus' aphorisms: "Let any one of you who is without sin be the first to throw a stone at her."

"Hey Girl" features guest vocals by Welch and its lyrics are an ode to feminism. Reviewers observed the inspiration on Elton John's 1974 single "Bennie and the Jets". The eleventh track, "Angel Down", is a "torch song" that was inspired by the death of Trayvon Martin, who was shot dead by George Zimmerman in 2012. The song includes lyrics regarding the shooting, such as: "Shots were fired on the street, by the church where we used to meet." Deluxe edition bonus track "Grigio Girls" was written for Sonja Durham, creative coordinator of her team, the Haus of Gaga, who had breast cancer. The song's lyrics include, "I was 23 / She was 35 / I was spiralin' out / And she was so alive". The second bonus track, "Just Another Day" was inspired by glam and the work of David Bowie.

== Release ==
Gaga's manager Bobby Campbell confirmed the album would not be released until the latter half of 2016; Elton John said it would not be released until 2017. In September 2016, Gaga updated her official website announcing the new album and revealed the title of the lead single, "Perfect Illusion". On September 15, the singer appeared on Apple Radio's Beats 1 and announced the album was titled Joanne and its release date would be October 21, 2016. She also confirmed that within the next 48 hours, the recording would be finished. Gaga confessed that finally announcing the album's name and release date was a bittersweet moment for her, acknowledging "this isn't the end just the end of this moment. It's also the beginning of this moment."

During the same interview, the singer confirmed that, unlike recent releases, the album would not be available exclusively on streaming services like Apple Music or Tidal. "I told my label that if they signed those contracts with Apple Music and Tidal, I'd leak all my own new music", she explained to host Zane Lowe. Gaga was opposed to these services having exclusive streaming rights to an artist's releases. Before its release, the album was leaked several times. On Amazon, the album was listed for pre-order, but using Amazon's Echo speaker allowed listeners to preview 30 second snippets of each track that if they instructed it to "play Joanne by Lady Gaga". Amazon later disabled previews for the whole album. Three days prior to the official release date of October 21, the album was mistakenly put out for sale in shops in Belgium, leading to additional leaks.

== Promotion ==
Chris Willman of Billboard wrote that the promotional "blitz" for Joanne "felt like something from a bygone era" due to the traditional route taken by Gaga and her team, in place of surprise album launches. During her interview on The Howard Stern Show, Gaga confirmed that she wanted to promote Joanne in the "old-school style". The events leading up to the release were described by Willman as "the most culturally ubiquitous rollout since Taylor Swift's 1989 two years ago". He theorized that after the perceived commercial disappointment with Artpop, Gaga's management wanted to make sure of a comeback with Joanne. Adding to this was the musical and stylistic change that Gaga underwent with the release, which would have confused her core audience and fans without promotion. Willman concluded that the promo would "provide a pre-Super Bowl primer to Middle America –that somewhere between the meat dress and the Tony Bennett collaboration, Gaga has settled into a middle path".

=== Singles ===
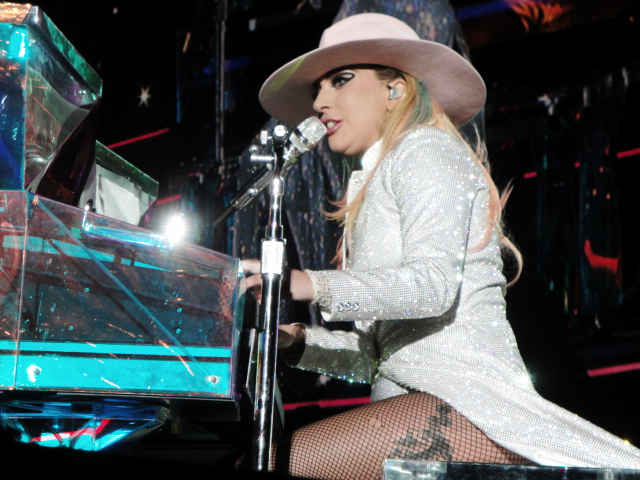
Gaga performing "Million Reasons" in her characteristic Joanne pink hat during the Joanne World Tour

"Perfect Illusion" was released as the album's first single on September 9, 2016. It received mixed to positive reviews from music critics, many of whom complimented its catchiness, the song's key change and Gaga's vocal delivery. Others deemed it a disappointing choice as a lead single compared to the singer's previous releases. The song debuted at number one in France while reaching a peak of number 15 on the Billboard Hot 100.

This was followed by the release of two promotional singles – "Million Reasons" on October 6 and "A-Yo" on October 18, 2016. "A-Yo" was initially chosen as the second single of the album, but "Million Reasons" proved to be more successful commercially and was released first. The song debuted at number 76 on the Billboard Hot 100, initially peaking at number 54. However, after Gaga's Super Bowl performance, it re-entered the chart at number four, becoming her fourteenth top-ten in the nation. The placement was aided by the song reaching number one on the Digital Songs Chart with sales of 149,000 copies, 7.6 million US streams and 15 million radio airplays. Most critics reacted positively to the song, highlighting its simple nature and the lyrics. It was certified Platinum by the Recording Industry Association of America (RIAA). For further promotion, both singles were accompanied by music videos, with the clip for "Million Reasons" being a continuation of "Perfect Illusion". The loose narrative contained in the two clips was continued later in a video for "John Wayne".

"Joanne" was released as the third single from the album in Italy on December 22, 2017, and a piano version of the song as well as its music video (dedicated to her deceased aunt Joanne) was released as a digital download worldwide on January 26, 2018.

=== Performances ===
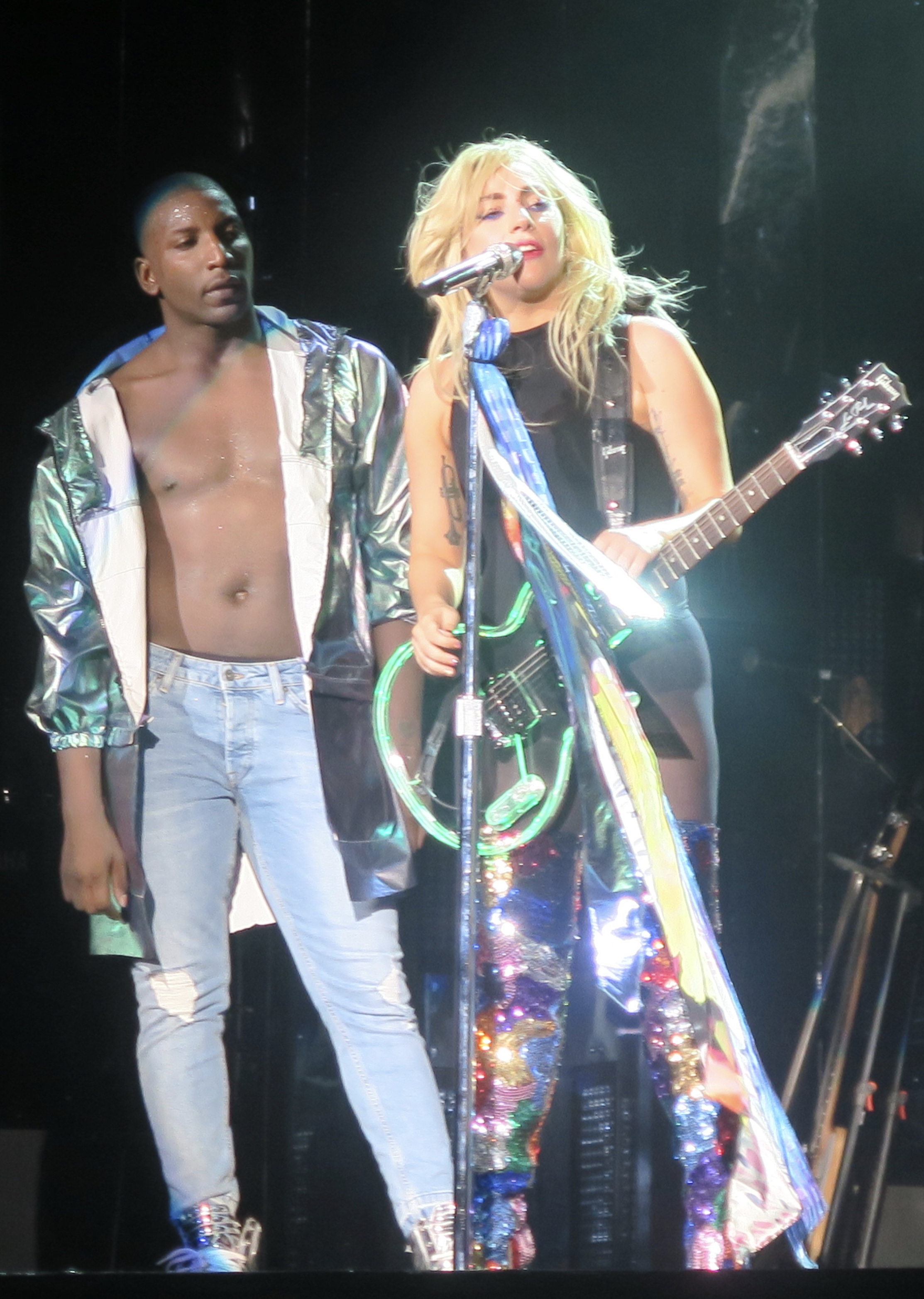
Gaga during the performance of "A-Yo" at her 2017 Coachella set

Promotional activities for Joanne began with the announcement of "Perfect Illusion" as the album's lead single. Gaga performed it live for the first time at MOTH Club in London, on September 10, 2016. She featured "Perfect Illusion" in a trailer for American Horror Story: Roanoke (2016). Gaga released a number of commercials for Apple Music featuring the track. She gave interviews to Good Morning America and The New York Times, and appeared at a Best Buy in Manhattan to purchase Joanne for unsuspecting customers.

The singer performed "A-Yo" and "Million Reasons" on Saturday Night Live on October 22, 2016, assisted by Ronson and Lindsey. On October 25, 2016, Gaga appeared on The Late Late Show with James Corden in the Carpool Karaoke segment singing her previous singles, along with "Perfect Illusion" and "Million Reasons". Later, she sang "A-Yo" on the main stage of The Late Late Show. The following week Gaga headed to Japan to promote Joanne. She performed a piano version of "Perfect Illusion" on Sukkiri, "Joanne" on News Zero and a medley of "Million Reasons", "Perfect Illusion" and "A-Yo" on SMAP×SMAP. Gaga sang "Million Reasons" at the 2016 American Music Awards and the Ali Forney Center, an LGBT pride center. Album tracks "Come to Mama" and "Angel Down" were performed at presidential candidate Hillary Clinton's final campaign stop in Raleigh, North Carolina.

Gaga traveled to Paris where she performed "Million Reasons", "A-Yo" and "John Wayne" at the 2016 Victoria's Secret Fashion Show. In the United Kingdom, Gaga began her promotion of Joanne with a surprise gig at London's Westfield shopping center. She later performed "Million Reasons" on the semi-final of the 13th season of The X Factor, and at the 2016 Royal Variety Performance, attended by Charles, Prince of Wales and Camilla, Duchess of Cornwall, as well as on Alan Carr's Happy Hour.

Gaga was the headliner of the Super Bowl LI halftime show, where along with past material, she performed "Million Reasons" on the piano. She was also a main headliner at the 2017 Coachella. Her setlist included "John Wayne", "A-Yo" and "Million Reasons" from the album. In 2018, Gaga performed "Joanne" and "Million Reasons" on the piano at the 60th Annual Grammy Awards, where she was joined on stage by Mark Ronson, who played guitar.

=== Tour ===
Shortly before the release of the album, Gaga announced her Dive Bar Tour, sponsored by Bud Light. The 3-date long concert series saw her visit dive bars in the United States on October 5, 20 and 27, 2016. Her performances were live streamed on Bud Light's Facebook page. Gaga described the dive bar sets as an opportunity to return to her roots, and said that she aimed to make a closer connection with her audience after her stadium and arena shows. She added the venues would accentuate the "raw Americana vibe" of the album.

On February 5, 2017, Gaga announced she would embark on the Joanne World Tour to support the album. It began on August 1, 2017, and ended on February 1, 2018. Gaga postponed the European leg of the tour due to severe pain caused by fibromyalgia and was forced to cancel the last 10 shows. The tour's concerts were deemed "more minimalist" compared to previous tours, but received praise for its visuals, Gaga's singing abilities and her connection with the audience. The tour ultimately grossed $95 million from sales of 842,000 tickets.

== Critical reception ==
Professional ratings
Aggregate scores
Source	Rating
AnyDecentMusic?	6.4/10
Metacritic	67/100
Review scores
Source	Rating
AllMusic	3.5/5 stars
The A.V. Club	B
Chicago Tribune	2/4 stars
The Daily Telegraph	4/5 stars
The Guardian	3/5 stars
The Independent	3/5 stars
NME	4/5 stars
Pitchfork	6.9/10
Rolling Stone	3.5/5 stars
Slant Magazine	3/5 stars

According to the review aggregator Metacritic, Joanne received "generally favorable reviews" based on a weighted average score of 67 out of 100 from 27 critic scores. AnyDecentMusic? summed up the critical consensus as 6.4 out of 10. British music journalist Neil McCormick gave the album 4 out of 5 stars in The Daily Telegraph, stating "for all its bravura exuberance and pop slickness it is old fashioned to its core". Stephen Thomas Erlewine of AllMusic gave it 3.5 out of 5 stars, writing that unlike Gaga's previous endeavors, where she appeared as a "high-wire act", Joanne was more "earth-bound" and is a "record made by an artist determined to execute only the stunts she knows how to pull off. ... Gaga's feet remain firmly planted in dance-pop even when she brings in a number of collaborators." Rolling Stone's Rob Sheffield also awarded the album 3.5 out of 5 stars, and described the release as an "old-school Nineties soft rock album, heavy on the acoustic guitar". He complimented the understated production by Ronson and the other producers.

Writing for The A.V. Club, Annie Zaleski commended the "genre fluidity" of Joanne. Rating it a "B", Zaleski said that "Diamond Heart", "John Wayne", "Sinner's Prayer" and "Hey Girl" were the album's best tracks and highlighted Gaga's vocal prowess. In a 3 out of 5 star review for Slant Magazine, Sal Cinquemani criticized the album for its oversung ballads and lack of strong hooks, but deemed it more consistent and focused than Artpop. Maeve McDermott of USA Today complimented Gaga for "expanding her artistic vision and toying with different genres [on the album], while still recording the customary pop tracks listeners have come to expect". Andy Gill gave the album 3 out of 5 stars in a review for The Independent. Gill commended the album's rock-leaning tracks, and Homme's work on "A-Yo" and "John Wayne" as highlights, but called "Perfect Illusion" dull.

The Guardian's Caroline Sullivan considered Joanne a "brave move" for Gaga and rated it 3 out of 5 stars. She explained that "Gaga's huge voice adds a self-protective veneer, as does the presence of the other musicians, but at least she's done the groundwork for future albums that might show her with true transparency". Digital Spy's Lewis Corner wrote: "Joanne is clearly Gaga's most personal album, popping aside the synthetic personas for something more honest and, well, human. Mother Monster may be retired for now, but Lady Gaga's sheer musical brilliance still shines through." For Evan Sawdey of PopMatters, the album—with its "flaws and all"—was a correct musical step for Gaga, which he believed would make "fans and observers once again rethink what they know about the daring diva". Similarly, Amanda Petrusich of Pitchfork remarked how Gaga explored an alternative path musically, diverging from the "visual provocations" that had permeated most of her career.

Mikael Wood of the Los Angeles Times felt that most songs on the album "lacked strong stories" and were "mere stylistic exercises" on Gaga's part. Rich Juzwiak, who reviewed Joanne for Spin, did not find the musical evolution that Gaga presented on the album authentic. Rating the album 2 out of 5 stars, journalist Greg Kot wrote in the Chicago Tribune that "[Gaga] sounds like she's just trying too hard" with Joanne. He also criticized the social commentary-filled lyrics on songs like "Come to Mama" and "Angel Down". Jon Caramanica of The New York Times noted the album's elemental sound did not come as a surprise and felt that it was not "daring or radical—it's logical, a rejoinder to her past and also to the candy-striped pop that surrounds her".

== Commercial performance ==
In the United States, Joanne debuted at number one on the Billboard 200, moving 201,000 album-equivalent units of which 170,000 were pure sales, according to Nielsen SoundScan. It became Gaga's fourth album to top the chart following Born This Way (2011), Artpop (2013), and Cheek to Cheek (2014). It was 2016's second-highest debut for an album by a woman in the US after Beyoncé's Lemonade opened with 653,000 copies. As a result, Gaga became the first woman to have four US number one albums in the 2010s. The album-equivalent units for Joanne consisted of 135,000 song sales and 26 million streams along with 170,000 traditional album sales. Joanne's debut helped Gaga rise to number one on the Billboard Artist 100, which measures artist activity across the publication's most influential charts. The album's sales dropped by 70% to 61,000 units in the second week, with it falling to number five on the Billboard 200. Following Gaga's Super Bowl halftime show performance, Joanne rose from number 66 to number 2 on the Billboard 200, selling 48,000 copies and 74,000 album-equivalent units. It has sold 649,000 units as of February 2019 in the United States and was certified Platinum in October 2017 by the Recording Industry Association of America (RIAA) for selling over a million equivalent units in the country.

Joanne debuted at number two on the Canadian Albums Chart with 17,500 album-equivalent units, behind Leonard Cohen's You Want It Darker. According to the Canadian SoundScan, the album had the third-highest on-demand streams in the country. On November 4, 2016, the album was certified Gold by Music Canada for shipments of 40,000 copies in the country. Like in the United States, the Super Bowl performance also had an impact in Canada, where Joanne vaulted from number 54 to number 2 on the album chart, with a 524 percent gain in album-equivalent units.

In the United Kingdom, Joanne debuted at number three on the UK Albums Chart, with first-week sales of 26,694 copies, behind Elvis Presley's posthumous release, The Wonder of You, and Michael Bublé's Nobody but Me. On the UK Album Downloads Chart, Joanne entered the chart at number one. It also reached number two on the Official Albums Streaming Chart and number five on the Official Physical Albums Chart. The following week it dropped to number 14, with sales of 9,602 units. Following the Super Bowl performance, the record rose from number 88 to number 11 on the chart with sales increasing to 5,289 copies. As of June 2020, the album has sold 168,564 copies in the UK and has been certified Gold by the British Phonographic Industry (BPI). Joanne debuted at number three on the Irish Albums Chart. The album's debut failed to meet expectations in France, where it entered the album chart at number nine, with sales of just over 8,000 copies. Pure Charts theorized that the moderate performance of the lead single, "Perfect Illusion", and the absence of Gaga in the media during the album's release week contributed to the album's low sales. By year end, they deemed Joanne one of the commercially disappointing albums in France, achieving total sales of only 12,000 copies. Two years after its release, the album earned a Gold certification for selling 50,000 equivalent units there.

Joanne debuted at number two on both the Australian and New Zealand album charts. The Australian Recording Industry Association (ARIA) reported that Joanne was Gaga's second consecutive solo album to debut at number two on the chart following Artpop. In Japan, Joanne debuted at number 10 on the Oricon Albums Chart with first week sales of 8,026 copies. On the Billboard Japan Hot Albums chart, Joanne debuted at number seven. According to the International Federation of the Phonographic Industry (IFPI), Joanne was the 22nd best-selling album of 2016, selling one million copies that year.

== Accolades and impact ==
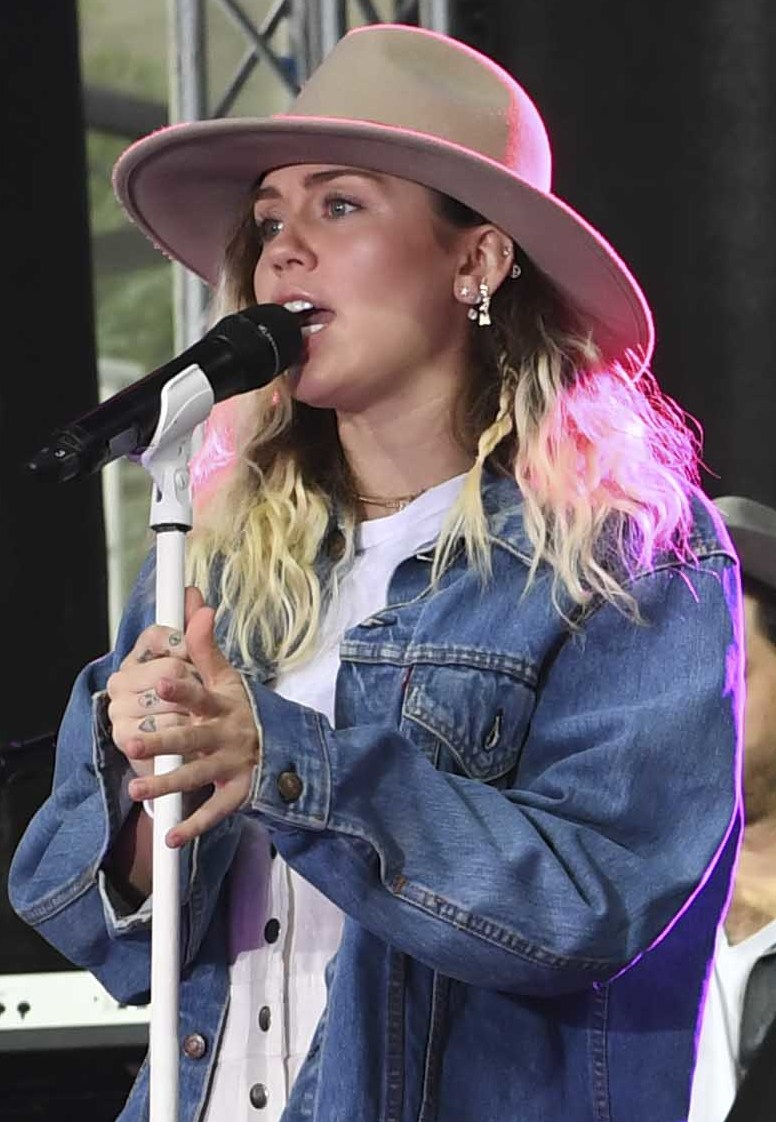
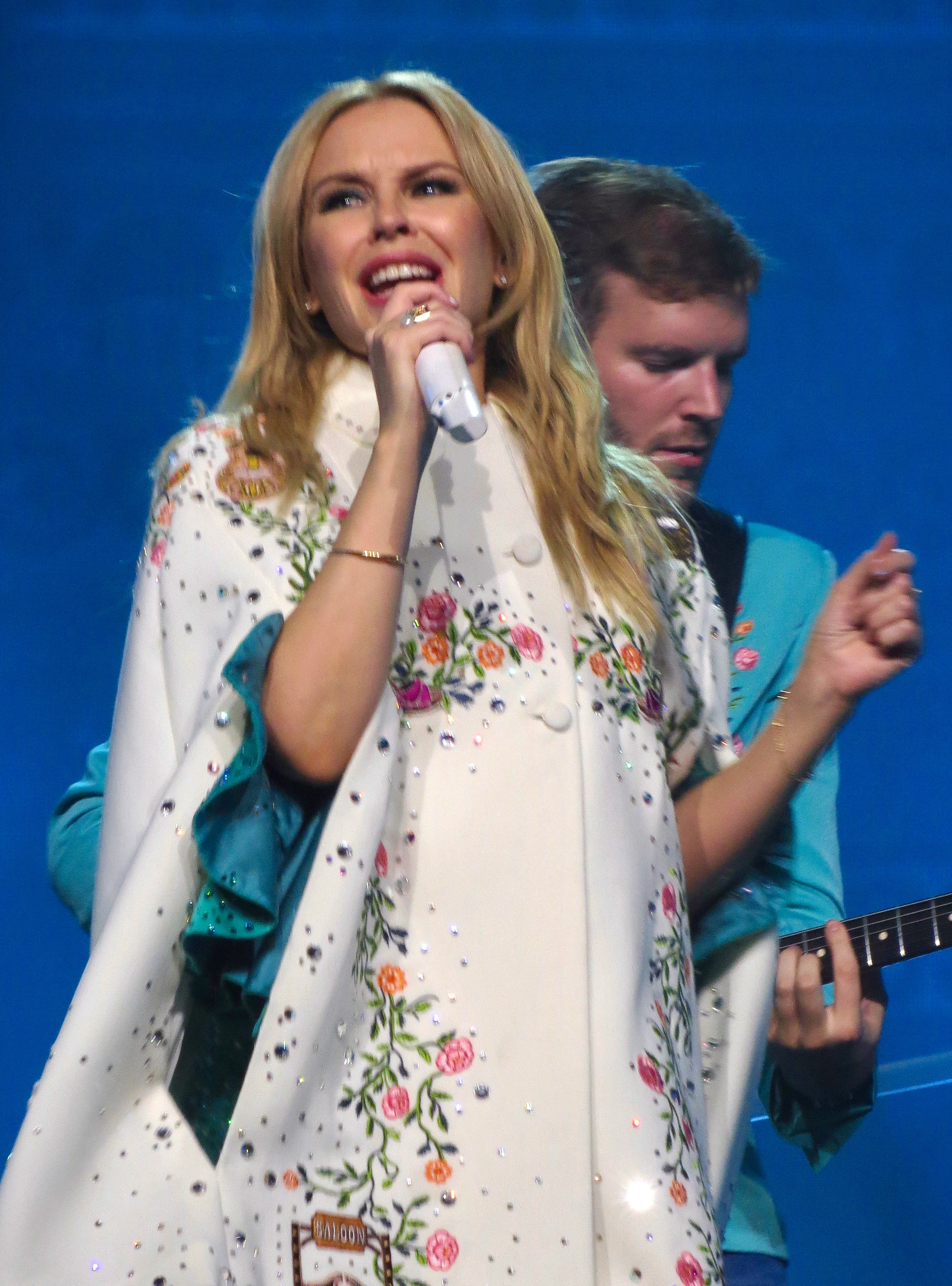
Joanne's impact was observed in the subsequent musical releases of artists such as Miley Cyrus (left) and Kylie Minogue (right). Both singers pictured performing during their country phase.

Joanne was ranked in several publications' year-end lists. Billboard ranked it as the 32nd best album of 2016, stating that the "kitchen-sink pop album" had an "instant-classic breakup ballad" in "Million Reasons", which enabled Gaga to reclaim "her sweet spot with Joanne". Digital Spy's Lewis Corner placed the record at number nine, believing that "simplicity" was the key to the album's success. Joanne was NME magazine's 20th best album of the year, with the publication highlighting how it hearkened back to the stripped-down sound employed by Gaga in her early years as an artist. For Rolling Stone, the album was the seventh best pop release of 2016, stating that "Gaga's soft-rock transformation takes the pop star into a new direction without losing her flair for the dramatic and penchant for the kitschy." The album was nominated for the Grammy Award for Best Pop Vocal Album at the 60th Annual Grammy Awards, while "Million Reasons" was nominated for Best Pop Solo Performance. "Million Reasons" was one of the award-winning songs at the BMI Awards. The piano version of the title track won Best Pop Solo Performance at the 61st Annual Grammy Awards.

While reviewing Kesha's third studio album, Rainbow (2017), Spencer Kornhaber of The Atlantic noted the use of analogue instruments in lieu of electric ones as had been done with the songs on Joanne. Kesha also tamed down her image like Gaga, but kept her distinct personality. In a Vanity Fair article, Josh Duboff wrote that singer Justin Timberlake's "countryfied" musical endeavors with his Man of the Woods (2018) album era recalled Joanne. Kornhaber and Billy Nilles from E! News identified Miley Cyrus's sixth studio album Younger Now (2017) and Kylie Minogue's fourteenth studio album Golden (2018) as part of a trend of pop singers going through a country phase, which they compared to Gaga's work on Joanne.

Brittany Spanos of Rolling Stone observed that Joanne served as singer Noah Cyrus's "muse", leading her to incorporate the country-themes of Gaga's endeavor. In Billboard, Gary Trust noted that with the release of "Million Reasons", Gaga had brought her vocal abilities to the forefront. He interviewed radio programmers who theorized that releasing the song was part of a bigger musical picture and believed that the musical scene was "entering a new era of traditional ballads and big vocals".

== Track listing ==
Standard edition
No.	Title	Writer(s)	Producer(s)	Length
1.	"Diamond Heart"	Stefani Germanotta; Mark Ronson; Josh Homme	Ronson; Lady Gaga; BloodPop; Homme^{[a]}; Jeff Bhasker^{[a]}	3:30
2.	"A-Yo"	Germanotta; Hillary Lindsey; Ronson; Michael Tucker	Ronson; BloodPop; Gaga	3:28
3.	"Joanne"	Germanotta; Ronson	Ronson; Gaga; BloodPop	3:17
4.	"John Wayne"	Germanotta; Ronson; Tucker; Homme	Ronson; BloodPop; Gaga	2:54
5.	"Dancin' in Circles"	Germanotta; Beck Hansen; Tucker; Ronson	Ronson; Gaga; BloodPop	3:27
6.	"Perfect Illusion"	Germanotta; Kevin Parker; Ronson; Tucker	Ronson; Parker; Gaga; BloodPop	3:02
7.	"Million Reasons"	Germanotta; Lindsey; Ronson	Ronson; Gaga; BloodPop	3:25
8.	"Sinner's Prayer"	Germanotta; Josh Tillman; Ronson; Thomas Brenneck	Ronson; Gaga; BloodPop	3:43
9.	"Come to Mama"	Germanotta; Tillman; Emile Haynie	Ronson; Haynie; Gaga; BloodPop	4:15
10.	"Hey Girl" (featuring Florence Welch)	Germanotta; Welch; Ronson	Ronson; Gaga; BloodPop	4:15
11.	"Angel Down"	Germanotta; Nadir Khayat	Ronson; Gaga; BloodPop	3:49
Total length:				39:05

Deluxe edition
No.	Title	Writer(s)	Producer(s)	Length
12.	"Grigio Girls"	Germanotta; Lindsey; Ronson; Tucker	Ronson; Gaga; BloodPop	3:00
13.	"Just Another Day"	Germanotta	Ronson; Gaga	2:58
14.	"Angel Down" (work tape)	Germanotta; Khayat	RedOne; Gaga	2:20
Total length:				47:23

Japanese CD bonus track
No.	Title	Writer(s)	Producer(s)	Length
15.	"Million Reasons" (work tape)	Germanotta; Lindsey; Ronson	Gaga; Ronson; BloodPop	3:23
Total length:				50:46

=== Notes ===
- ^{^[a]} signifies a co-producer

== Personnel ==
Credits adapted from the liner notes of Joanne.

=== Music ===
- Lady Gaga – vocals (all tracks), piano (tracks 7, 9–11, 13–14), percussion (tracks 2–3), backing vocals (track 9)
- Mark Ronson – bass (tracks 1–4, 7, 9, 12–13), guitar (tracks 2–7, 9, 12–13), keyboards (tracks 3, 13), Mellotron strings (tracks 3, 11), electric piano (track 1), synthesizer (track 6)
- BloodPop – synthesizer (tracks 4–6, 8, 12), keyboards (tracks 3, 7, 11), organ (track 2), bass (track 6), drums (track 11)
- Emile Haynie – drums, additional synths (track 9)
- Kevin Parker – drums, guitar, synthesizer (track 6)
- RedOne – guitar (track 14)
- Josh Homme – guitar (tracks 1–2, 4, 6), drums (track 4), slide guitar (track 8)
- Jeff Bhasker – synthesizers (track 1)
- Hillary Lindsey – additional vocals (tracks 7, 12), guitar (track 7), background vocals (track 8)
- Kelsey Lu – cello (track 10)
- Josh Tillman – drums (track 1)
- Thomas Brenneck – guitars (tracks 2, 8, 10)
- Victor Axelrod – piano (track 8), synthesizer (track 10)
- Florence Welch – vocals (track 10)
- Jack Byrne – guitar (track 10)
- Brian Newman – trumpet (tracks 2, 13)
- Anthony Rossomando – guitar (track 12)
- J. Gastelum Cochemea – tenor saxophone (track 2)
- Dave Guy – trumpet (track 2)
- Este Haim – percussion (track 2)
- Matt Helders – drums (track 1)
- Ian Hendrickson-Smith – baritone saxophone (track 2)
- James King – baritone, tenor and alto saxes (track 9)
- Brent Kolatalo – drums (track 9)
- Steve Kortyka – saxophone (track 13)
- Don Lawrence – vocal instruction
- Sean Lennon – slide guitar (track 8)
- Ken Lewis – drums (track 9)
- Leon Michels – keyboards, Mellotron (track 8)
- Tom Moth – harp (track 10)
- Nicholas Movshon – bass (tracks 8, 10)
- Harper Simon – guitar (track 3)
- Homer Steinweiss – drums (tracks 8, 10, 13)

=== Production ===
- Lady Gaga – production (all tracks)
- Mark Ronson – production (tracks 1–13)
- BloodPop – production (tracks 1–12), rhythm track (tracks 1–7, 12), rhythm programming (tracks 8, 10), string programming (track 7), synthesizer programming (track 9)
- Emile Haynie – production (track 9)
- Kevin Parker – production (track 6)
- RedOne – production, mixing, programming (track 14)
- Josh Homme – co-production (track 1)
- Jeff Bhasker – co-production (track 1)
- Ben Baptie – mixing (tracks 11, 13)
- Joshua Blair – recording (tracks 1–13)
- Brandon Bost – mixing assistance (tracks 1, 3–4, 7–10, 12), recording (track 7)
- Johnnie Burik – recording assistance (track 3)
- Christopher Cerullo – recording assistance (track 10)
- Chris Claypool – recording assistance (track 10)
- David "Squirrel" Covell – recording assistance (tracks 1–10, 12), recording (track 11)
- Tom Coyne – mastering (all tracks)
- Matthew Cullen – recording (track 8)
- Riccardo Damian – recording (tracks 1, 13)
- Abby Echiverri – recording assistance (track 8)
- Tom Elmhirst – mixing (tracks 1, 3–4, 7–10, 12)
- Serban Ghenea – mixing (tracks 2, 5–6)
- John Hanes – mix engineering (tracks 2, 5–6)
- Michael Harris – recording assistance (track 10)
- T.I. Jakke – mixing (track 14)
- Jens Jungkerth – recording (tracks 8, 10)
- Brent Kolatalo – recording (track 9)
- Ken Lewis – recording (track 9)
- Barry McCready – recording assistance (tracks 2, 4–7, 9, 11–13), recording (track 13)
- Ed McEntee – recording assistance (track 8)
- Randy Merrill – mastering (all tracks)
- Trevor Muzzy – recording (track 14)
- Charley Pollard – recording assistance (track 4)
- Benjamin Rice – recording (tracks 2, 12)
- Dave Russell – recording (track 3)
- Brett "123" Shaw – recording (track 10)
- Justin Smith – recording (tracks 1, 3, 8), recording assistance (tracks 2, 4, 6, 11)
- Joe Visciano – mixing assistance (tracks 1, 3–4, 7–10, 12), recording (track 7)
- Alekes Von Korff – recording (track 14)

=== Management ===
- Lady Gaga – executive production, creative direction, photography
- Mark Ronson – executive production
- Bobby Campbell – management
- John Janick – A&R
- Andrea Gelardin – creative direction, photography
- Ruth Hogben – creative direction, photography
- Brandon Maxwell – creative direction, fashion direction
- Florence Welch – photography
- Collier Schorr – photography
- Sandra Amador – styling
- Frederic Aspiras – hair
- Sarah Tanno – makeup
- An Yen – graphic design
- Brian Roettinger – graphic design
- Lisa Einhorn-Gilder – production coordination
- Ashley Gutierrez – assistance to Lady Gaga

== Charts ==
=== Weekly charts ===
Weekly chart performance for Joanne
Chart (2016–2017)	Peak position
Argentine Albums (CAPIF)	3
Australian Albums (ARIA)	2
Austrian Albums (Ö3 Austria)	9
Belgian Albums (Ultratop Flanders)	5
Belgian Albums (Ultratop Wallonia)	6
Brazilian Albums (ABPD)	1
Canadian Albums (Billboard)	2
Croatian International Albums (HDU)	3
Czech Albums (ČNS IFPI)	3
Danish Albums (Hitlisten)	12
Dutch Albums (Album Top 100)	5
Finnish Albums (Suomen virallinen lista)	5
French Albums (SNEP)	9
German Albums (Offizielle Top 100)	6
Greek Albums (IFPI)	4
Hungarian Albums (MAHASZ)	12
Irish Albums (IRMA)	3
Italian Albums (FIMI)	2
Japanese Albums (Oricon)	10
Japanese International Albums (Oricon)	1
Japanese Hot Albums (Billboard Japan)	7
Mexican Albums (AMPROFON)	1
New Zealand Albums (RMNZ)	2
Norwegian Albums (VG-lista)	5
Polish Albums (ZPAV)	10
Portuguese Albums (AFP)	4
Scottish Albums (Official Charts)	3
Slovak Albums (ČNS IFPI)	2
South Korean Albums (Gaon)	32
South Korean International Albums (Gaon)	1
Spanish Albums (Promusicae)	2
Swedish Albums (Sverigetopplistan)	3
Swiss Albums (Schweizer Hitparade)	3
Taiwanese Albums (Five Music)	1
UK Albums (Official Charts)	3
US Billboard 200	1
US Indie Store Album Sales (Billboard)	1

=== Year-end charts ===
Year-end chart performance for Joanne
Chart (2016)	Position
Australian Albums (ARIA)	74
Belgian Albums (Ultratop Flanders)	99
Belgian Albums (Ultratop Wallonia)	97
French Albums (SNEP)	156
Hungarian Albums (MAHASZ)	98
Italian Albums (FIMI)	85
Mexican Albums (AMPROFON)	52
South Korean International Albums (Gaon)	94
Spanish Albums (PROMUSICAE)	92
Swiss Albums (Schweizer Hitparade)	69
UK Albums (Official Charts)	84
US Billboard 200	108
US Digital Albums (Billboard)	23

Chart (2017)	Position
Canadian Albums (Billboard)	35
Spanish Albums (PROMUSICAE)	79
US Billboard 200	35

== Certifications and sales ==
Certifications and sales for Joanne
Region	Certification	Certified units/sales
Australia (ARIA)	Gold	35,000^{‡}
Austria (IFPI Austria)	Gold	7,500^{*}
Canada (Music Canada)	Gold	40,000^{^}
Denmark (IFPI Danmark)	Gold	10,000^{‡}
France (SNEP)	Gold	50,000^{‡}
Italy (FIMI)	Gold	25,000^{*}
Mexico (AMPROFON)	Platinum	60,000^{‡}
New Zealand (RMNZ)	Platinum	15,000^{‡}
Norway (IFPI Norway)	Gold	10,000^{‡}
Poland (ZPAV)	Platinum	20,000^{‡}
United Kingdom (BPI)	Gold	168,564
United States (RIAA)	Platinum	1,000,000^{‡}
Summaries
Worldwide	—	1,000,000
^{*} Sales figures based on certification alone.^{^} Shipments figures based on certification alone.^{‡} Sales+streaming figures based on certification alone.

== See also ==
- List of Billboard 200 number-one albums of 2016
- List of Gaon Album Chart number ones of 2016
- List of number-one albums of 2016 (Mexico)
- List of Oricon number-one albums of 2016
- List of UK Album Downloads Chart number ones of the 2010s
