= Chris Johnson (drummer) =

American session musician

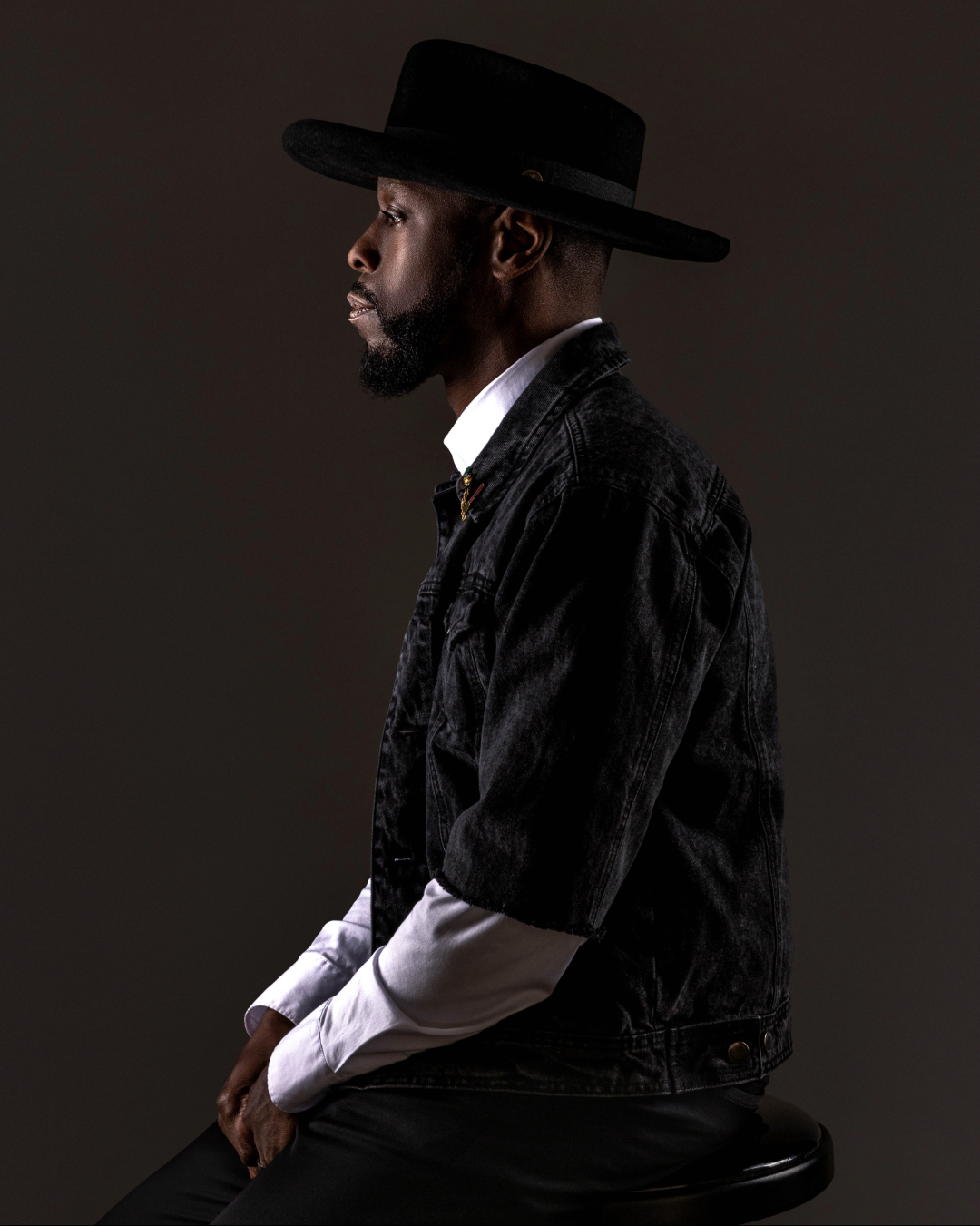

Chris Johnson is an American drummer, producer and songwriter. He is known for his work as a touring and session drummer across pop, R&B, and gospel music, and has performed and recorded with Lady Gaga, Sabrina Carpenter, Rihanna, Stevie Wonder, Camila Cabello, Madonna, and Jennifer Lopez.

Johnson is featured as a drummer on the soundtrack to A Star Is Born (2018), and he holds songwriting and production credits on Snoop Dogg's gospel album Bible of Love (2018). Johnson was recognised by the Grammy Awards in 2011 as a songwriter on the track Survive on the album Something Big by Mary Mary which was nominated for Best Gospel album. He is a key member of the National Black Musicians Coalition Board.

== Early life and background ==
Johnson was born and raised in Los Angeles, California, and grew up in the South Central area of the city. He is the son of a pastor and church choir leader and began playing drums in his father's church at an early age.

During his school years, Johnson participated in marching band, jazz band, and other school ensembles.

== Career ==
Johnson's career began in the gospel and R&B music scenes in the early 2000s. He performed and recorded with Patti LaBelle, Mýa, Lalah Hathaway, Donnie McClurkin, Norman Hutchins, and Beverly Crawford. He worked as the drummer for Stevie Wonder (including his televised performance at the Queen's Diamond Jubilee celebrations in 2012) and later joined Rihanna's live band for international tours. His touring résumé also includes Sabrina Carpenter, Lady Gaga, Madonna, Jennifer Lopez, Camila Cabello, Seal, Heather Headley, and Anastacia.

Johnson recorded drums on the soundtrack to A Star Is Born (2018). The soundtrack debuted at number one on the Billboard 200 and the UK Albums Chart and went on to win four Grammy Awards, as well as the Academy Award for Best Original Song for "Shallow".

Johnson performed on the Joanne World Tour (2017–2018), which visited arenas and stadiums across North America, Europe, and Asia. Johnson also performed with Gaga during her Las Vegas residency, Enigma, which ran from 2018 to 2020, and in 2022 as part of her Chromatica Ball tour, performing at stadium and arena shows in support of her album Chromatica.

Johnson also appeared with Gaga at broadcast and festival events, including televised performances and Coachella.

From 2022, Johnson became a core member of singer Sabrina Carpenter's touring and performance band, serving as her drummer across televised performances, festivals, and international arena tours. He performed with Carpenter on her NPR Tiny Desk Concert, released in December 2024 and appeared with her on Saturday Night Live in May 2024 during the season finale hosted by Jake Gyllenhaal, performing as part of her live band.

Johnson toured with Carpenter on her Emails I can't Send tour in 2022, in support on Taylor Swift's Eras tour through 2023–24, and on her Short n' Sweet Tour in 2024–25, including European festival Primavera Sound Barcelona. He also appeared with her at BST Hyde Park in London in July 2025.

=== Recording and songwriting ===
In 2011, Johnson co-wrote the track Survive for the album Something Big by Mary Mary. The album was nominated for Best Gospel Album in the Grammys in 2011, for which Johnson received recognition from The Recording Academy for his role as a songwriter on the album.

In 2018, Johnson recorded drums for multiple tracks on the soundtrack to A Star Is Born, starring Lady Gaga and Bradley Cooper. The album debuted at number one on the Billboard 200 and the UK Albums Chart and won four Grammy Awards, as well as the Academy Award for Best Original Song for "Shallow."

That same year, Johnson co-wrote and co-produced tracks on Snoop Dogg's gospel album Bible of Love, including "On Time" and "Come as You Are." The album debuted at number one on the Billboard Top Gospel Albums chart.

=== Authorship ===
In January 2021, Johnson released his instructional book Pop, R&B and Gospel Drumming, published by Hal Leonard. Johnson had a feature spot when playing with The 8G Band on Late Night with Seth Meyers, where Seth spoke to him about the release of his book.

== Accolades ==
Johnson was profiled by Live Nation as 'One to Watch', citing his resume as "reading like a who's who in the world of music". He has featured several times in Modern Drummer magazine: first as a cover feature and in-depth article when touring with Rihanna in 2012 (published as Rhythm Magazine), as a featured artist on his work touring with Lady Gaga (2020) and then as a featured cover artist again in 2023.

He was nominated twice in Modern Drummer's annual awards, receiving runner-up in the 2023 Pop Readers Poll and nominee in the 2025 Pop Readers' Poll. Johnson is featured in the documentary Hired Gun, which aired in theatres in 2017, which examines the careers of LA session and touring musicians, and was profiled by AfterBuzzTV. He is a founding member of Legally Blynd, a band featuring other similarly credited LA session musicians.

== Advocacy ==
Johnson is a board member of the National Black Musicians Coalition and has featured in Drummer's Resource and Spotify's Entertainment Engine speaking on these topics.

== Endorsements ==
Johnson endorses several musical instrument manufacturers, including Yamaha (drums), Sabian (cymbals), Remo (drumheads), and Vater (drumsticks).

== Selected credits ==
Year	Artist / Project	Role	Notes
2010-2014	Last Girl on Earth/ Loud/ 777/ Diamonds World Tour - Rihanna	Drummer	
2011	Something Big - Mary Mary	Songwriter and drummer	Grammy-nominated album (Best Gospel album)
2015-2016	Rebel Hearts Tour - Madonna	Drummer	
2018	A Star Is Born (soundtrack)	Drummer	Academy Award– and Grammy Award–winning soundtrack
2018	Bible of Love – Snoop Dogg	Songwriter, producer, drums	Debuted at No. 1 on Billboard Top Gospel Albums
2018-2020	Lady Gaga's Las Vegas Residency Enigma	Drummer	Las Vegas Residency
2019	Late Night with Seth Myers - feature spot	Drummer with 8G and feature spot	Promotion of his book Pop, R&B and Gospel Drumming.
2024	Saturday Night Live	Live performance drummer	Performance with Sabrina Carpenter
2024	NPR Tiny Desk Concert – Sabrina Carpenter	Drummer	Performance with Sabrina Carpenter
2024–2025	Short n' Sweet Tour – Sabrina Carpenter	Touring drummer	International arena tour
2025	Primavera Sound (Barcelona)	Live performance drummer	Festival appearance with Sabrina Carpenter
2025	BST Hyde Park	Live performance drummer	Appearance with Sabrina Carpenter
2026	The Recording Academy 68th Annual GRAMMY Awards.	Live performance drummer	Televised performance with Sabrina Carpenter
2026	Coachella - headlining with Sabrina Carpenter.	Live performance drummer	Headline show both weekends, including surprise collaboration with Madonna.
2026	Touring with Ne-Yo	Live performance drummer	Performing with Ne-Yo on the Canadian and USA legs of his international tour ‘Nights Like This’.
