= Don Lawrence (vocal coach) =

American vocal coach and musician

- Born: Don Lawrence; 1945 (age 80–81); New York City, U.S.
- Education: Juilliard School
- Known for: Vocal Coach
- Children: Max Lawrence
- Parent: Martin Lawrence

Don Lawrence (born 1945) is an American vocal coach and musician from New York City.

== Career ==
Don Lawrence grew up in Manhattan, and his father, Martin Lawrence, set the professional stage for his career in music. Martin Lawrence was the lead tenor with the Philadelphia Opera Company. In the early 1950s, Martin Lawrence made the transition to teaching, opening his vocal studio at the Ansonia Hotel on West 73rd Street. Martin's students included Annie Lennox, Dion DiMucci, Bobby Rydell, Buddy Greco, Jerry Vale, Jane Morgan, Connie Francis, Vikki Carr, The Spinners, and The B-52's.

After being the personal vocalist for the Commanding General of the Third Army and Band and performing at the Copacabana in New York City, Don Lawrence joined his father at the Lawrence Vocal Studio, founded in 1948. He studied voice at the Juilliard School. Lawrence and his father, Martin Lawrence, created the Lawrence technique, a modern version of Bel canto, a classical opera technique supporting vocalists in popular music. His son, Max Lawrence, is carrying the torch as the studio's third-generation vocal coach.

Lawrence has worked with Lady Gaga, Whitney Houston, Mick Jagger, Axl Rose, Bono, Bette Midler, Alicia Keys, Billy Courtman, Mark Ronson, and Christina Aguilera. The Wall Street Journal dubbed him "The most experienced coach at the Super Bowl" for his work in preparing Lady Gaga for her Super Bowl Halftime show and Academy Awards performances. In addition to being with her while filming A Star Is Born and her tours including The Monster Ball Tour, Joanne World Tour, and The Chromatica Ball.

He supported The Rolling Stones as their vocal coach on their Shine a Light Tour and Forty Licks World Tour.
