= List of awards and nominations received by Lady Gaga =

Lady Gaga awards and nominations
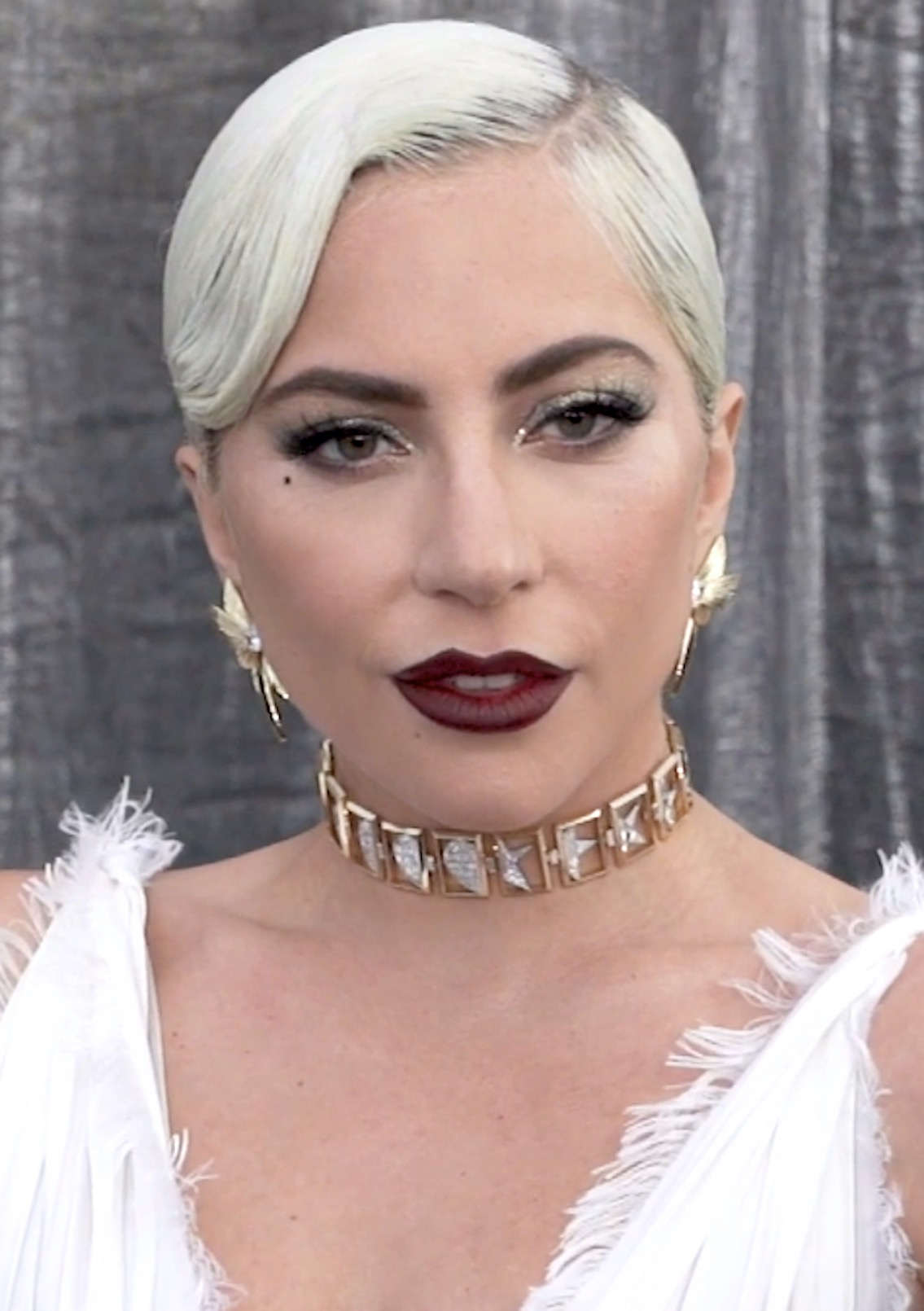
- Gaga at the 2019 Screen Actors Guild Awards
Awards and nominations
Award	Wins	Nominations
Academy Awards	1	4
Actor Awards	0	4
American Music Awards	6	29
Billboard Music Awards	10	44
Brit Awards	3	7
BAFTA Awards	1	3
Critics' Choice Awards	2	7
Emmy Awards	1	6
Golden Globe Awards	2	6
Grammy Awards	16	47
MTV Video Music Awards	22	55

Totals (Note: Certain award groups do not simply award one winner. They acknowledge several different recipients, have runners-up, and have third place. Since this is a specific recognition and is different from losing an award, runner-up mentions are considered wins in this award tally. For simplification and to avoid errors, each award in this list has been presumed to have had a prior nomination.)
- Wins: 644
- Nominations: 1,321

Lady Gaga is an American singer, songwriter and actress who has received many awards and nominations. She is one of the few acts to win three of the four major American entertainment awards (EGOT). Gaga made her debut with the album The Fame (2008), which was nominated for six Grammy Awards, and won Best Electronic/Dance Album and Best Dance Recording for "Poker Face". It also won a Brit Award for International Album. The follow-up EP, The Fame Monster (2009), included the singles "Bad Romance" and "Telephone", whose music videos won eight of their thirteen nominations at the 2010 MTV Video Music Awards (VMA)—making Gaga the most-nominated artist in VMA history for a single year and the first person to win the Video of the Year and earn multiple nominations in the same category in one single night. In 2011, Gaga was nominated for six Grammy Awards, and won three—Best Pop Vocal Album for The Fame Monster, and Best Female Pop Vocal Performance and Best Short Form Music Video for "Bad Romance". Born This Way (2011), Gaga's second studio album, accrued three Grammy nominations, including her third consecutive nomination for Album of the Year. The music video for the track "Born This Way" won two VMAs, including Best Female Video. Her third album, Artpop (2013), was nominated for a Billboard Music Award for Top Dance/Electronic Album. In other musical ventures, Gaga released two collaborative jazz albums with Tony Bennett, Cheek to Cheek (2014) and Love for Sale (2021), which both received the Grammy Award for Best Traditional Pop Vocal Album.

In 2015, Gaga released a song for the documentary film, The Hunting Ground, called "Til It Happens to You". It won a Satellite Award for Best Original Song, and was nominated for an Academy Award and a Golden Globe Award for Best Original Song, a Grammy Award for Best Song Written for Visual Media, and a Critics' Choice Movie Award for Best Song. That year, she became the first artist to win the Songwriters Hall of Fame's Contemporary Icon Award for "attaining an iconic status in pop culture". Gaga received a Golden Globe Award for Best Actress and a nomination at the 20th Satellite Awards for her role in the fifth season of American Horror Story, entitled Hotel. She has earned five Primetime Emmy Award nominations for her television specials and songwriting.

In 2018, Gaga starred as a singer in the musical romance A Star Is Born, which garnered her the Critics' Choice Movie Award for Best Actress and the National Board of Review Award for Best Actress, as well as nominations for an Academy Award, a BAFTA Award, a Golden Globe Award, and an Actor Award for Best Actress. The same film's soundtrack earned her the BAFTA Award for Best Film Music and Grammy Award for Best Compilation Soundtrack for Visual Media. For its lead single "Shallow" (featuring Bradley Cooper), Gaga received an Academy Award and a Golden Globe Award for Best Original Song, a Critics' Choice Movie Award for Best Song and Grammy Awards for Best Pop Duo/Group Performance and Best Song Written for Visual Media, an award she also won the following year for "I'll Never Love Again". As a result, Gaga became the first woman in history to win an Academy Award, BAFTA Award, Golden Globe Award and Grammy Award in one single year.

In 2020, Gaga's sixth album, Chromatica, yielded the single "Rain on Me" (with Ariana Grande), for which she won her second Grammy Award for Best Pop Duo/Group Performance — becoming the first all-female collaboration in history to win it. In the same year, at the MTV Video Music Awards, she was honored with the inaugural Tricon Award recognizing artists accomplished in different areas of the entertainment industry, and won four more awards, including Song of the Year, making her the fourth biggest winner in VMAs' history, with eighteen awards. In 2021, she starred as Patrizia Reggiani in the crime biopic House of Gucci, earning her the New York Film Critics Circle Award for Best Actress and nominations for a BAFTA Award, a Golden Globe Award, an Actor Award and a Critics' Choice Movie Award for Best Actress.

In 2022, Gaga released the song "Hold My Hand", for the film, Top Gun: Maverick, earning her a Sports Emmy Award for Outstanding Music Direction and her third Satellite Award for Best Original Song, as well as additional nominations for an Academy Award and a Golden Globe Award for Best Original Song, a Critics' Choice Movie Award for Best Song and Grammy Awards for Best Compilation Soundtrack for Visual Media and Best Song Written for Visual Media. In 2024, she released "Die with a Smile" (with Bruno Mars) as her first single from her eighth album Mayhem, for which she won the Grammy Award for Best Pop Duo/Group Performance, becoming the first artist to win in the said category three times, followed in 2025 by "Abracadabra", for which she won the Grammy Awards for Best Pop Vocal Album and Best Dance Pop Recording. The same year, she was honored the Innovator Award at the iHeartRadio Music Awards as recognition for being a "modern day artist innovator", who has taken "beyond creating music and performances that have inspired the world, and an outspoken activist, philanthropist and supporter of many important issues".

In addition to music awards, Gaga has earned several accolades for her philanthropic efforts, seventeen Guinness World Records, and received a National Arts Awards' Young Artist Award, which honors individuals who have shown accomplishments and leadership early in their career. She also won the Fashion Icon award by the Council of Fashion Designers of America (CFDA) in 2011 and the Jane Ortner Artist Award from the Grammy Museum in 2016. Recognized by Billboard as the Greatest Pop Star in 2009, with honorable mention in 2010 and 2011, and Woman of the Year in 2015, she has also been included in several Forbes' power rankings, was ranked fourth on VH1's Greatest Women in Music (2012), and was named by Time as one of the 100 most influential people in the world in 2010 and 2019.

== Major associations ==
=== Academy Awards ===
Year	Category	Nominated work	Result	Ref.
2016	Best Original Song	"Til It Happens to You" (from The Hunting Ground)	Nominated	
2019	Best Actress	A Star Is Born	Nominated	
2019	Best Original Song	"Shallow" (from A Star is Born)	Won	
2023	Best Original Song	"Hold My Hand" (from Top Gun: Maverick)	Nominated	

=== Actor Awards ===
Year	Category	Nominated work	Result	Ref.
2019	Outstanding Cast in a Motion Picture	A Star Is Born	Nominated	
2019	Outstanding Actress in a Leading Role	A Star Is Born	Nominated	
2022	Outstanding Cast in a Motion Picture	House of Gucci	Nominated	
2022	Outstanding Actress in a Leading Role	House of Gucci	Nominated	

=== BAFTA Awards ===
Year	Category	Nominated work	Result	Ref.
British Academy Film Awards
2019	Best Film Music	A Star Is Born	Won	
2019	Best Actress in a Leading Role	A Star Is Born	Nominated	
2022	Best Actress in a Leading Role	House of Gucci	Nominated	

=== Critics' Choice Awards ===
Year	Category	Nominated work	Result	Ref.
Critics' Choice Movie Awards
2012	Best Song	"Hello Hello" (from Gnomeo & Juliet)	Nominated	
2016	Best Song	"Til It Happens to You" (from The Hunting Ground)	Nominated	
2019	Best Song	"Shallow" (from A Star is Born)	Won	
2019	Best Actress	A Star Is Born	Won (Note: Tied with Glenn Close for The Wife (2017))	
2022	Best Actress	House of Gucci	Nominated	
2023	Best Song	"Hold My Hand" (from Top Gun: Maverick)	Nominated	
Critics' Choice Super Awards
2025	Best Actress in a Superhero Movie	Joker: Folie à Deux	Nominated	

=== Emmy Awards ===
Year	Category	Nominated work	Result	Ref.
Primetime Emmy Awards
2011	Outstanding Variety, Music or Comedy Special	Lady Gaga Presents the Monster Ball Tour: At Madison Square Garden	Nominated	
2015	Outstanding Variety, Music or Comedy Special	Tony Bennett and Lady Gaga: Cheek to Cheek Live!	Nominated	
2017	Outstanding Special Class Program	Super Bowl LI Halftime Show Starring Lady Gaga	Nominated	
2022	Outstanding Variety Special (Pre-Recorded)	One Last Time: An Evening with Tony Bennett and Lady Gaga	Nominated	
2026	Outstanding Original Music and Lyrics	"The Dead Dance" (from Wednesday: "Woe Me the Money")	Nominated	
Sports Emmy Awards
2025	Outstanding Music Direction	Super Bowl LIX Pregame Show: Hold My Hand	Won	

=== Golden Globe Awards ===
Year	Category	Nominated work	Result	Ref.
2012	Best Original Song – Motion Picture	"Hello Hello" (from Gnomeo & Juliet)	Nominated	
2016	Best Actress – Miniseries or Television Film	American Horror Story: Hotel	Won	
2019	Best Actress in a Motion Picture – Drama	A Star Is Born	Nominated	
2019	Best Original Song – Motion Picture	"Shallow" (from A Star is Born)	Won	
2022	Best Actress in a Motion Picture – Drama	House of Gucci	Nominated	
2023	Best Original Song – Motion Picture	"Hold My Hand" (from Top Gun: Maverick)	Nominated	

=== Grammy Awards ===
Year	Category	Nominated work	Result	Ref.
2009	Best Dance Recording	"Just Dance" (featuring Colby O'Donis)	Nominated	
2010	Record of the Year	"Poker Face"	Nominated	
2010	Song of the Year	"Poker Face"	Nominated	
2010	Best Dance Recording	"Poker Face"	Won	
2010	Album of the Year	The Fame	Nominated	
2010	Best Electronic/Dance Album	The Fame	Won	
2011	Album of the Year	The Fame Monster	Nominated	
2011	Best Pop Vocal Album	The Fame Monster	Won	
2011	Best Female Pop Vocal Performance	"Bad Romance"	Won	
2011	Best Short Form Music Video	"Bad Romance"	Won	
2011	Best Pop Collaboration with Vocals	"Telephone" (featuring Beyoncé)	Nominated	
2011	Best Dance Recording	"Dance in the Dark"	Nominated	
2012	Album of the Year	Born This Way	Nominated	
2012	Best Pop Vocal Album	Born This Way	Nominated	
2012	Best Pop Solo Performance	"You and I"	Nominated	
2015	Best Traditional Pop Vocal Album	Cheek to Cheek (with Tony Bennett)	Won	
2016	Best Song Written for Visual Media	"Til It Happens to You"	Nominated	
2018	Best Pop Solo Performance	"Million Reasons"	Nominated	
2018	Best Pop Vocal Album	Joanne	Nominated	
2019	Record of the Year	"Shallow" (with Bradley Cooper)	Nominated	
2019	Song of the Year	"Shallow" (with Bradley Cooper)	Nominated	
2019	Best Pop Duo/Group Performance	"Shallow" (with Bradley Cooper)	Won	
2019	Best Song Written for Visual Media	"Shallow" (with Bradley Cooper)	Won	
2019	Best Pop Solo Performance	"Joanne (Where Do You Think You're Goin'?)"	Won	
2020	Song of the Year	"Always Remember Us This Way"	Nominated	
2020	Best Song Written for Visual Media	"I'll Never Love Again" (Film Version)	Won	
2020	Best Compilation Soundtrack for Visual Media	A Star Is Born (with Bradley Cooper)	Won	
2021	Best Pop Duo/Group Performance	"Rain on Me" (with Ariana Grande)	Won	
2021	Best Pop Vocal Album	Chromatica	Nominated	
2022	Record of the Year	"I Get a Kick Out of You" (with Tony Bennett)	Nominated	
2022	Best Pop Duo/Group Performance	"I Get a Kick Out of You" (with Tony Bennett)	Nominated	
2022	Best Music Video	"I Get a Kick Out of You" (with Tony Bennett)	Nominated	
2022	Album of the Year	Love for Sale (with Tony Bennett)	Nominated	
2022	Best Traditional Pop Vocal Album	Love for Sale (with Tony Bennett)	Won	
2023	Best Song Written for Visual Media	"Hold My Hand"	Nominated	
2023	Best Compilation Soundtrack for Visual Media	Top Gun: Maverick (Note: (with Lorne Balfe, Harold Faltermeyer and Hans Zimmer))	Nominated	
2025	Song of the Year	"Die with a Smile" (with Bruno Mars)	Nominated	
2025	Best Pop Duo/Group Performance	"Die with a Smile" (with Bruno Mars)	Won	
2026	Record of the Year	"Abracadabra"	Nominated	
2026	Song of the Year	"Abracadabra"	Nominated	
2026	Best Dance Pop Recording	"Abracadabra"	Won	
2026	Album of the Year	Mayhem	Nominated	
2026	Best Pop Vocal Album	Mayhem	Won	
2026	Best Pop Solo Performance	"Disease"	Nominated	
2026	Best Traditional Pop Vocal Album	Harlequin	Nominated	
2027	Best Pop Duo/Group Performance	"Runway" (with Doechii)	Pending	
2027	Best Song Written for Visual Media	"Runway" (with Doechii)	Pending	

== Other associations ==
Awards and nominations received by Lady Gaga
Award	Year (Note: Indicates the year of ceremony. Each year is linked to the article about the awards held that year, wherever possible.)	Nominated work	Category	Result	Ref.
4Music Video Honours	2010	"Alejandro"	Best Video	Nominated	
4Music Video Honours	2010	"Telephone" (featuring Beyoncé)	Best Video	Nominated	
4Music Video Honours	2010	"Telephone" (featuring Beyoncé)	Hottest Hookup	Nominated	
4Music Video Honours	2010	Lady Gaga	Hottest Girl	Nominated	
4Music Video Honours	2011	"Born This Way"	Best Video	Nominated	
4Music Video Honours	2011	"The Edge of Glory"	Best Video	Nominated	
4Music Video Honours	2011	Lady Gaga	Best Girl	Nominated	
4Music Video Honours	2013	"Applause"	Best Video	Nominated	
4Music Video Honours	2013	Lady Gaga	Best Girl	Nominated	
AACTA International Awards	2019	A Star Is Born	Best International Actress	Nominated	
AACTA International Awards	2022	House of Gucci	Best International Actress	Nominated	
AARP Movies for Grownups Awards	2022	House of Gucci	Best Ensemble	Nominated	
ACE Awards	2009	Lady Gaga	Stylemaker Award	Won	
ADC Annual Awards	2025	"Abracadabra"	Motion / Film / Music Video	Merit	
ADC Annual Awards	2025	"Abracadabra"	Craft in Motion / Film / Editing	Merit	
ADL Awards	2015	Born This Way Foundation	Making a Difference Award	Won	
Adweek Experiential Awards	2025	"Abracadabra": From Fan to Featured	Best Consumer Activation	Nominated	
Adweek Experiential Awards	2025	"Abracadabra": From Fan to Featured	Best Use of Celebrity in an Experiential Activation	Nominated	
Adweek Experiential Awards	2025	"Abracadabra": From Fan to Featured	Best Use of Music/Audio in an Experiential Activation	Nominated	
Adweek Experiential Awards	2025	"Abracadabra": From Fan to Featured	Best Use of Partnership in an Experiential Activation	Nominated	
Adweek Experiential Awards	2025	"Abracadabra": From Fan to Featured	Best Use of Social Media in an Experiential Activation	Won	
AFRIMA Awards	2025	"Die with a Smile" (with Bruno Mars)	Best Global Act	Pending	
Alliance of Women Film Journalists	2018	A Star Is Born	Best Actress	Nominated	
Alliance of Women Film Journalists	2021	House of Gucci	Best Actress	Nominated	
Allure Readers' Choice Awards	2020	Haus Labs	Best New Brand	Won	
American Music Awards	2009	Lady Gaga	Artist of the Year	Nominated	
American Music Awards	2009	Lady Gaga	Favorite Breakthrough Artist	Nominated	
American Music Awards	2009	Lady Gaga	Favorite Pop/Rock Female Artist	Nominated	
American Music Awards	2009	The Fame	Favorite Pop/Rock Album	Nominated	
American Music Awards	2010	Lady Gaga	Artist of the Year	Nominated	
American Music Awards	2010	Lady Gaga	Favorite Pop/Rock Female Artist	Won	
American Music Awards	2011	Lady Gaga	Artist of the Year	Nominated	
American Music Awards	2011	Lady Gaga	Favorite Pop/Rock Female Artist	Nominated	
American Music Awards	2011	Born This Way	Favorite Pop/Rock Album	Nominated	
American Music Awards	2017	Lady Gaga	Favorite Pop/Rock Female Artist	Won	
American Music Awards	2019	"Shallow" (with Bradley Cooper)	Collaboration of the Year	Nominated	
American Music Awards	2019	A Star Is Born (with Bradley Cooper)	Favorite Soundtrack	Nominated	
American Music Awards	2020	Lady Gaga	Favorite Pop/Rock Female Artist	Nominated	
American Music Awards	2020	Lady Gaga	Favorite Electronic Dance Music Artist	Won	
American Music Awards	2020	"Rain on Me" (with Ariana Grande)	Collaboration of the Year	Nominated	
American Music Awards	2020	"Rain on Me" (with Ariana Grande)	Favorite Music Video	Nominated	
American Music Awards	2022	Top Gun: Maverick (with Lorne Balfe, Harold Faltermeyer and Hans Zimmer)	Favorite Soundtrack	Nominated	
American Music Awards	2025	Lady Gaga	Favorite Female Pop Artist	Nominated	
American Music Awards	2025	Lady Gaga	Favorite Electronic Dance Music Artist	Won	
American Music Awards	2025	"Die with a Smile" (with Bruno Mars)	Song of the Year	Nominated	
American Music Awards	2025	"Die with a Smile" (with Bruno Mars)	Collaboration of the Year	Won	
American Music Awards	2025	"Die with a Smile" (with Bruno Mars)	Favorite Pop Song	Nominated	
American Music Awards	2025	"Die with a Smile" (with Bruno Mars)	Favorite Music Video	Won	
American Music Awards	2026	Lady Gaga	Artist of the Year	Nominated	
American Music Awards	2026	Lady Gaga	Favorite Female Pop Artist	Nominated	
American Music Awards	2026	Mayhem	Album of the Year	Nominated	
American Music Awards	2026	Mayhem	Best Pop Album	Nominated	
American Music Awards	2026	The Mayhem Ball	Tour of the Year	Nominated	
American Music Awards	2026	"Abracadabra"	Best Vocal Performance	Nominated	
American Scene Awards	2025	"Abracadabra"	Music & Sound Recordings	Nominated	
American Society of Magazine Editors	2010	Elle, January 2010, Lady Gaga	Best Cover – Fashion and Beauty	Nominated	
American Society of Magazine Editors	2013	Vanity Fair, January 2012, Lady Gaga	Best Cover – Entertainment and Celebrity	Nominated	
American Society of Magazine Editors	2015	Harper's Bazaar, March 2014, Lady Gaga	Best Cover – Fashion and Beauty	Won	
Anthem Awards	2021	Born This Way Foundation's #BeKind21 2021 Campaign	Diversity, Equity & Inclusion (Campaign)	Gold	
Anthem Awards	2024	Born This Way Foundation's Impact Report	Education, Art & Culture (Impact Report)	Bronze	
Anthem Awards	2026	Born This Way Foundation's Generation Be There	Belonging & Inclusion (Campaign)	Bronze	
APRA Music Awards	2020	"Shallow" (with Bradley Cooper)	Most Performed International Work	Won	
ARIA Music Awards	2010	Lady Gaga	Most Popular International Artist	Nominated	
ARIA Music Awards	2011	Lady Gaga	Most Popular International Artist	Nominated	
ARIA Number One Chart Awards	2018	"Shallow" (with Bradley Cooper)	Number One Single	Won	
ARIA Number One Chart Awards	2018	A Star Is Born (with Bradley Cooper)	Number One Album	Won	
ARIA Number One Chart Awards	2020	Chromatica	Number One Album	Won	
ARIA Number One Chart Awards	2025	Mayhem	Number One Album	Won	
The Arthur Awards	2026	The Mayhem Ball	The Top Tour Award	Nominated	
Asian Pop Music Awards	2025	Mayhem	Global Artist Award	Won	
Australian Commercial Radio Awards	2012	Lady Gaga Live from Sydney Monster Hall	Best Music Special	Won	
Awwwards	2025	Lady Gaga Official Website	Websites	Honoree	
Bambi Award	2011	Lady Gaga	International Pop Artist	Won	
Beloved Community Awards	2021	Lady Gaga	Yolanda Denise King Higher Ground Award	Won	
BBC Sound of...	2009	Lady Gaga	Sound of 2009	6th place	
BDSCertified Spin Awards	2009	"LoveGame"	100,000 Spins	Won	
BDSCertified Spin Awards	2009	"LoveGame"	200,000 Spins	Won	
BDSCertified Spin Awards	2009	"Poker Face"	400,000 Spins	Won	
BDSCertified Spin Awards	2009	"Paparazzi"	50,000 Spins	Won	
BDSCertified Spin Awards	2009	"Paparazzi"	100,000 Spins	Won	
BDSCertified Spin Awards	2009	"Just Dance" (featuring Colby O'Donis)	500,000 Spins	Won	
BDSCertified Spin Awards	2009	"Bad Romance"	100,000 Spins	Won	
BDSCertified Spin Awards	2010	"Bad Romance"	200,000 Spins	Won	
BDSCertified Spin Awards	2010	"Telephone" (featuring Beyoncé)	50,000 Spins	Won	
BDSCertified Spin Awards	2010	"Bad Romance"	300,000 Spins	Won	
BDSCertified Spin Awards	2010	"Telephone" (featuring Beyoncé)	100,000 Spins	Won	
BDSCertified Spin Awards	2010	"Alejandro"	200,000 Spins	Won	
BDSCertified Spin Awards	2010	"Poker Face"	500,000 Spins	Won	
BDSCertified Spin Awards	2010	"Bad Romance"	500,000 Spins	Won	
BDSCertified Spin Awards	2010	"Alejandro"	300,000 Spins	Won	
BDSCertified Spin Awards	2011	"Born This Way"	100,000 Spins	Won	
BDSCertified Spin Awards	2011	"Paparazzi"	400,000 Spins	Won	
BDSCertified Spin Awards	2011	"Telephone" (featuring Beyoncé)	400,000 Spins	Won	
BDSCertified Spin Awards	2011	"Bad Romance"	600,000 Spins	Won	
BDSCertified Spin Awards	2011	"Poker Face"	600,000 Spins	Won	
Berlin Commercial Festival	2025	"Abracadabra"	Craft: Editing	Nominated	
Berlin Commercial Festival	2026	"Runway" (with Doechii)	Best Music Video	Nominated	
Berlin Commercial Festival	2026	"Runway" (with Doechii)	Craft: Costume Styling	Won	
Berlin Commercial Festival	2026	"Runway" (with Doechii)	Craft: Editing	Nominated	
Berlin Commercial Festival	2026	"Runway" (with Doechii)	Craft: Idea	Nominated	
Berlin Commercial Festival	2026	"Runway" (with Doechii)	Craft: Production Design	Nominated	
Berlin Music Video Awards	2018	"John Wayne"	Most Bizarre	Nominated	
Berlin Music Video Awards	2025	"Abracadabra"	Best Editor	Nominated	
Best of Las Vegas Awards	2020	Lady Gaga	Resident Performer/Headliner	Nominated	
Best of Las Vegas Awards	2020	Enigma	Bachelor Party	Bronze	
Best of Las Vegas Awards	2020	Enigma	Bachelorette Party	Nominated	
Best of Las Vegas Awards	2020	Enigma	Production Show	Nominated	
Best of Las Vegas Awards	2022	Lady Gaga	Resident Performer/Headliner	Nominated	
Best of Las Vegas Awards	2022	Jazz & Piano	Production Show	Nominated	
BET Awards	2010	"Video Phone" (with Beyoncé)	Video of the Year	Won	
BET Awards	2010	"Video Phone" (with Beyoncé)	Best Collaboration	Nominated	
BET Awards	2011	Lady Gaga	FANdemonium Award	Nominated	
Billboard Japan Music Awards	2011	"Born This Way"	Billboard Japan Adult Contemporary of the Year	Won	
Billboard Japan Music Awards	2011	"Born This Way"	Billboard Japan Digital and Overseas Airplay of the Year	Won	
Billboard Latin Music Awards	2010	Lady Gaga	Crossover Artist of the Year (Solo)	Won	
Billboard Latin Music Awards	2010	Lady Gaga	Crossover Artist of the Year	Nominated	
Billboard Latin Music Awards	2011	Lady Gaga	Crossover Artist of the Year	Nominated	
Billboard Latin Music Awards	2011	Lady Gaga	Hot Latin Songs — Female Artist of the Year	Nominated	
Billboard Live Music Awards	2010	The Monster Ball Tour	Breakthrough Award	Won	
Billboard Live Music Awards	2010	The Monster Ball Tour	Concert Marketing & Promotion Award	Won	
Billboard Live Music Awards	2012	Born This Way Ball	Eventful Fans' Choice Award	Won	
Billboard Live Music Awards	2017	Joanne World Tour	Concert Marketing & Promotion Award	Nominated	
Billboard.com Mid-Year Music Awards	2011	Lady Gaga	First-half MVP	Nominated	
Billboard.com Mid-Year Music Awards	2011	Lady Gaga	Best Dressed	Won	
Billboard.com Mid-Year Music Awards	2011	"Born This Way"	Favorite Hot 100 No. 1 Song	Nominated	
Billboard.com Mid-Year Music Awards	2011	Born This Way	Favorite Billboard 200 No. 1 Album	Nominated	
Billboard.com Mid-Year Music Awards	2011	"Judas"	Best Music Video	Nominated	
Billboard.com Mid-Year Music Awards	2011	Radio 1's Big Weekend	Best Festival Performance	Won	
Billboard.com Mid-Year Music Awards	2011	The Monster Ball Tour	Best Tour	Nominated	
Billboard.com Mid-Year Music Awards	2012	Madonna vs. Lady Gaga	Most Memorable Feud	Won	
Billboard.com Mid-Year Music Awards	2012	Born This Way Ball	Most Anticipated Event of 2012's Second Half	Nominated	
Billboard.com Mid-Year Music Awards	2013	New Music from Lady Gaga	Most Anticipated Event of 2013's Second Half	Nominated	
Billboard.com Mid-Year Music Awards	2013	Lady Gaga Cancels Tour Dates	Most Disappointing	Won	
Billboard.com Mid-Year Music Awards	2014	"G.U.Y."	Best Music Video	Nominated	
Billboard.com Mid-Year Music Awards	2014	Lady Gaga's Paint-vomiting SXSW Performance	Most Buzzed-About Moment	Won	
Billboard.com Mid-Year Music Awards	2014	ArtRave: The Artpop Ball	Best Tour	Won	
Billboard.com Mid-Year Music Awards	2015	Lady Gaga and Taylor Kinney	Hottest Couple	Nominated	
Billboard.com Mid-Year Music Awards	2015	Cheek to Cheek Tour	Best Tour	Nominated	
Billboard.com Mid-Year Music Awards	2015	Lady Gaga at the Academy Awards	Best Televised Performance	Nominated	
Billboard Music Awards	2011	Lady Gaga	Top Artist	Nominated	
Billboard Music Awards	2011	Lady Gaga	Top Female Artist	Nominated	
Billboard Music Awards	2011	Lady Gaga	Top Touring Artist	Nominated	
Billboard Music Awards	2011	Lady Gaga	Top Social Artist	Nominated	
Billboard Music Awards	2011	Lady Gaga	Top Streaming Artist	Nominated	
Billboard Music Awards	2011	Lady Gaga	Top Digital Media Artist	Nominated	
Billboard Music Awards	2011	Lady Gaga	Top Pop Artist	Won	
Billboard Music Awards	2011	Lady Gaga	Top Dance/Electronic Artist	Won	
Billboard Music Awards	2011	Lady Gaga	Fan Favorite Award	Nominated	
Billboard Music Awards	2011	The Fame	Top Pop Album	Nominated	
Billboard Music Awards	2011	The Fame	Top Dance/Electronic Album	Won	
Billboard Music Awards	2011	The Fame Monster	Top Dance/Electronic Album	Nominated	
Billboard Music Awards	2011	The Remix	Top Dance/Electronic Album	Nominated	
Billboard Music Awards	2011	"Bad Romance"	Top Streaming Song (Video)	Nominated	
Billboard Music Awards	2011	"Bad Romance"	Top Dance/Electronic Song	Nominated	
Billboard Music Awards	2011	"Telephone" (featuring Beyoncé)	Top Dance/Electronic Song	Nominated	
Billboard Music Awards	2012	Lady Gaga	Top Artist	Nominated	
Billboard Music Awards	2012	Lady Gaga	Top Female Artist	Nominated	
Billboard Music Awards	2012	Lady Gaga	Top Billboard 200 Artist	Nominated	
Billboard Music Awards	2012	Lady Gaga	Top Social Artist	Nominated	
Billboard Music Awards	2012	Lady Gaga	Top Digital Media Artist	Nominated	
Billboard Music Awards	2012	Lady Gaga	Top Pop Artist	Nominated	
Billboard Music Awards	2012	Lady Gaga	Top Dance/Electronic Artist	Won	
Billboard Music Awards	2012	Lady Gaga	Favorite Artist	Won	
Billboard Music Awards	2012	Lady Gaga	Most Influential Style	Won	
Billboard Music Awards	2012	Born This Way	Top Billboard 200 Album	Nominated	
Billboard Music Awards	2012	Born This Way	Top Pop Album	Nominated	
Billboard Music Awards	2012	Born This Way	Top Electronic/Dance Album	Won	
Billboard Music Awards	2012	The Fame	Top Electronic/Dance Album	Nominated	
Billboard Music Awards	2013	Lady Gaga	Top Touring Artist	Nominated	
Billboard Music Awards	2014	Lady Gaga	Top Dance/Electronic Artist	Nominated	
Billboard Music Awards	2014	Artpop	Top Dance/Electronic Album	Nominated	
Billboard Music Awards	2014	"Applause"	Top Dance/Electronic Song	Nominated	
Billboard Music Awards	2015	Lady Gaga	Top Touring Artist	Nominated	
Billboard Music Awards	2019	Lady Gaga	Top Song Sales Artist	Nominated	
Billboard Music Awards	2019	Lady Gaga and Bradley Cooper	Chart Achievement	Nominated	
Billboard Music Awards	2019	A Star Is Born (with Bradley Cooper)	Top Soundtrack	Nominated	
Billboard Music Awards	2019	"Shallow" (with Bradley Cooper)	Top Selling Song	Nominated	
Billboard Music Awards	2021	Lady Gaga	Top Dance/Electronic Artist	Won	
Billboard Music Awards	2021	Chromatica	Top Dance/Electronic Album	Won	
Billboard Music Awards	2021	"Stupid Love"	Top Dance/Electronic Song	Nominated	
Billboard Music Awards	2021	"Rain on Me" (with Ariana Grande)	Top Dance/Electronic Song	Nominated	
Billboard Music Awards	2022	Lady Gaga	Top Dance/Electronic Artist	Won	
Billboard Music Awards	2023	Top Gun: Maverick (with Lorne Balfe, Harold Faltermeyer and Hans Zimmer)	Top Soundtrack	Nominated	
Billboard Women in Music	2009	Lady Gaga	Rising Star Award	Won	
Billboard Women in Music	2015	Lady Gaga	Woman of the Year	Won	
BMI Film, TV & Visual Media Awards	2019	"Shallow"	Academy Award Honor	Won	
BMI London Awards	2018	"Million Reasons"	London Pop Award Songs	Won	
BMI Pop Awards	2010	"Just Dance" (featuring Colby O'Donis)	Most-Performed Songs of the Year	Won	
BMI Pop Awards	2010	"Poker Face"	Most-Performed Songs of the Year	Won	
BMI Pop Awards	2010	"LoveGame"	Most-Performed Songs of the Year	Won	
BMI Pop Awards	2011	Lady Gaga	BMI Songwriters of the Year	Won	
BMI Pop Awards	2011	"Paparazzi"	Most-Performed Songs of the Year	Won	
BMI Pop Awards	2011	"Bad Romance"	Most-Performed Songs of the Year	Won	
BMI Pop Awards	2011	"Telephone" (featuring Beyoncé)	Most-Performed Songs of the Year	Won	
BMI Pop Awards	2011	"Alejandro"	Most-Performed Songs of the Year	Won	
BMI Pop Awards	2012	"Born This Way"	Most-Performed Songs of the Year	Won	
BMI Pop Awards	2012	"The Edge of Glory"	Most-Performed Songs of the Year	Won	
BMI Pop Awards	2013	"You and I"	Most-Performed Songs of the Year	Won	
BMI Pop Awards	2015	"Applause"	Most-Performed Songs of the Year	Won	
BMI Pop Awards	2015	"Do What U Want" (featuring R. Kelly)	Most-Performed Songs of the Year	Won	
BMI Pop Awards	2018	"Million Reasons"	Most-Performed Songs of the Year	Won	
BMI Pop Awards	2020	"Shallow"	Most-Performed Songs of the Year	Won	
BMI Pop Awards	2021	"Stupid Love"	Most-Performed Songs of the Year	Won	
BMI Pop Awards	2021	"Rain on Me" (with Ariana Grande)	Most-Performed Songs of the Year	Won	
BMI Pop Awards	2024	"Bloody Mary"	Most-Performed Songs of the Year	Won	
BMI Pop Awards	2025	"Die with a Smile" (with Bruno Mars)	Most-Performed Songs of the Year	Won	
BMI Pop Awards	2026	"Abracadabra"	Most-Performed Songs of the Year	Won	
BMI Pop Awards	2026	"Disease"	Most-Performed Songs of the Year	Won	
Brain & Behavior Research Foundation	2019	Born This Way Foundation	Honorary Pardes Humanitarian Prize in Mental Health	Won	
Bravo Otto	2010	Lady Gaga	Super Female Singer	Nominated	
Bravo Otto	2011	Lady Gaga	Super Female Singer	Nominated	
Bravo Otto	2011	Lady Gaga	Internet Star	Nominated	
Bravo Otto	2012	Lady Gaga	Super Female Singer	Nominated	
Bravo Otto	2012	Lady Gaga	Internet Star	Nominated	
BreakTudo Awards	2019	Lady Gaga	International Female Artist	Nominated	
BreakTudo Awards	2020	Lady Gaga	International Female Artist	Won	
BreakTudo Awards	2020	Chromatica	Album of the Year	Won	
BreakTudo Awards	2020	"Rain on Me" (with Ariana Grande)	International Music Video	Nominated	
BreakTudo Awards	2020	"Sour Candy" (with Blackpink)	Collaboration of the Year	Nominated	
BreakTudo Awards	2022	Lady Gaga	International Female Artist	Nominated	
BreakTudo Awards	2025	Lady Gaga	International Female Artist	Nominated	
BreakTudo Awards	2025	"Abracadabra"	International Music Video	Nominated	
BreakTudo Awards	2026	"Runway" (with Doechii)	International Music Video	Pending	
Brit Awards	2010	Lady Gaga	International Breakthrough Act	Won	
Brit Awards	2010	Lady Gaga	International Female Solo Artist	Won	
Brit Awards	2010	The Fame	International Album	Won	
Brit Awards	2012	Lady Gaga	International Female Solo Artist	Nominated	
Brit Awards	2014	Lady Gaga	International Female Solo Artist	Nominated	
Brit Awards	2026	Lady Gaga	International Artist of the Year	Nominated	
Brit Awards	2026	"Die with a Smile" (with Bruno Mars)	International Song of the Year	Nominated	
British LGBT Awards	2015	Lady Gaga	LGBT+ Music Artist	Nominated	
British LGBT Awards	2016	Lady Gaga	Global Icon	Nominated	
British LGBT Awards	2017	Lady Gaga	LGBT+ Celebrity	Nominated	
British LGBT Awards	2022	Lady Gaga	LGBT+ Celebrity	Won	
British LGBT Awards	2022	Born This Way 10-Year Anniversary	Media Moment	Nominated	
BT Digital Music Awards	2010	Lady Gaga	Best International Artist	Won	
BT Digital Music Awards	2011	Lady Gaga	Best International Artist or Group	Nominated	
BuzzAngle Music Awards	2019	A Star Is Born (with Bradley Cooper)	Top Soundtrack Album	Won	
Camerimage	2010	"Bad Romance"	Best Cinematography in a Music Video	Nominated	
Camerimage	2010	"Bad Romance"	Best Music Video	Nominated	
Camerimage	2025	"The Dead Dance"	Best Cinematography in a Music Video	Nominated	
Camerimage	2025	"The Dead Dance"	Best Music Video	Nominated	
Cannes Lions	2016	The Lady Gaga + Intel Performance	Digital Installations & Events	Gold	
Cannes Lions	2017	Super Bowl Drones Half Time Show	Innovative Use of Technology	Silver	
Cannes Lions	2017	Super Bowl Drones Half Time Show	Use of Brand or Product Integration into a Programme or Platform	Bronze	
Cannes Lions	2025	"Abracadabra": From Fan to Featured	Fan Engagement/Community Building	Gold	
Cannes Lions	2025	"Abracadabra": From Fan to Featured	Sponsorship & Brand Partnership	Bronze	
Capri Hollywood International Film Festival	2019	"Shallow"	Best Original Song	Won	
Capri Hollywood International Film Festival	2022	House of Gucci	Best Actress	Won	
Capri Hollywood International Film Festival	2022	House of Gucci	Capri Italian-American Award	Won	
CD Shop Awards	2010	The Fame	Western Grand Prix	Won	
CFDA Fashion Awards	2011	Lady Gaga	Fashion Icon Award	Won	
Channel [V] Thailand Music Video Awards	2009	Lady Gaga	International Artist	Won	
Channel [V] Thailand Music Video Awards	2009	Lady Gaga	International New Artist	Nominated	
Channel [V] Thailand Music Video Awards	2009	"Poker Face"	International Music Video	Won	
Channel [V] Thailand Music Video Awards	2011	Lady Gaga	International Female Artist	Nominated	
Channel [V] Thailand Music Video Awards	2011	"Bad Romance"	International Music Video	Nominated	
Chicago Film Critics Association	2018	A Star Is Born	Best Actress	Nominated	
Chicago Film Critics Association	2018	A Star Is Born	Most Promising Performer	Nominated	
Clio Awards	2012	Lady Gaga	Music-Licensed	Nominated	
Clio Awards	2014	Gagadoll	Experiential	Bronze	
Clio Awards	2014	Gagadoll	Ambient	Nominated	
Clio Awards	2016	The Lady Gaga + Intel Performance	Medium Innovation	Bronze	
Clio Awards	2017	Intel Drones x Super Bowl Halftime Show With Lady Gaga	Event/Experiential	Silver	
Clio Awards	2017	Intel Drones x Super Bowl Halftime Show With Lady Gaga	Brand Partnerships & Collaborations	Bronze	
Clio Awards	2026	"Abracadabra": From Fan to Featured	Music	Bronze	
Clio Awards	2026	"Abracadabra": From Fan to Featured	Partnerships/Co-Creation	Silver	
Clio Awards	2026	"Abracadabra": From Fan to Featured	Social Media	Nominated	
Clio Awards	2026	"Abracadabra": From Fan to Featured	Cultural Resonance	Bronze	
Clio Awards	2026	"Abracadabra": From Fan to Featured	Real-Time Response	Bronze	
Clio Awards	2026	"Abracadabra": From Fan to Featured	Use of Talent & Influencers	Gold	
Clio Music Awards	2016	The Lady Gaga + Intel Performance	Innovation	Gold	
Clio Music Awards	2016	The Lady Gaga + Intel Performance	Partnerships	Gold	
Clio Music Awards	2016	The Lady Gaga + Intel Performance	Stage Design	Silver	
Clio Music Awards	2016	The Lady Gaga + Intel Performance	Events/Experiential	Nominated	
Clio Music Awards	2017	Intel Drones x Super Bowl Halftime Show With Lady Gaga	Partnerships & Collaborations	Gold	
Clio Music Awards	2017	"John Wayne"	Music Videos	Silver	
Clio Music Awards	2020	Super Saturday Night featuring Lady Gaga	Experience/Activation	Bronze	
Clio Music Awards	2020	"Rain on Me" (Campaign: A Voice Is All You Need)	Film/Video Craft	Gold	
Clio Music Awards	2026	"Abracadabra": From Fan to Featured	Partnerships, Sponsorships & Collaborations	Silver	
Clio Music Awards	2026	"Abracadabra": From Fan to Featured	Use of Artists, Talent, & Influencers	Gold	
Clio Music Awards	2026	"Abracadabra": From Fan to Featured	Events/Activation	Gold	
Clio Music Awards	2026	"Abracadabra": From Fan to Featured	Social Media	Silver	
Clio Music Awards	2026	"Abracadabra": From Fan to Featured	Viral Post	Silver	
Clio Music Awards	2026	"Abracadabra"	Editing	Gold	
Clio Music Awards	2026	Lady Gaga #TheDeadDanceOnShorts	Mixed Campaign	Silver	
COGAM	2011	Lady Gaga	International Artistic Award	Won	
Columbus Citizens Foundation	2015	Lady Gaga and Cynthia Germanotta	Humanitarian Award	Won	
Cybersmiler of the Month Awards	2020	One World: Together at Home	April's Cybersmiler of the Month	Won	
D&AD Pencil Awards	2025	"Abracadabra"	Music Videos / Performance	Nominated	
D&AD Pencil Awards	2026	"Abracadabra": From Fan to Featured	Digital Marketing / Use of Talent (Note: The entry won a Wood Pencil award for this category.)	Won	
D&AD Pencil Awards	2026	"Abracadabra": From Fan to Featured	Entertainment / User Participation	Nominated	
Dallas–Fort Worth Film Critics Association	2018	A Star Is Born	Best Actress	Runner-up	
Dallas–Fort Worth Film Critics Association	2021	House of Gucci	Best Actress	4th place	
Danish Music Awards	2010	The Fame Monster	International Album of the Year	Nominated	
Danish Music Awards	2019	"Shallow" (with Bradley Cooper)	International Hit of the Year	Won	
Detroit Film Critics Society	2018	A Star Is Born	Best Actress	Nominated	
Detroit Film Critics Society	2018	A Star Is Born	Breakthrough Performance	Nominated	
Detroit Film Critics Society	2021	House of Gucci	Best Ensemble	Nominated	
Digital Spy Reader Awards	2011	Lady Gaga	Best Female Artist	Runner-up	
Digital Spy Reader Awards	2011	Lady Gaga	Most Loved Celebrity	Runner-up	
Digital Spy Reader Awards	2011	"Born This Way"	Best Song	5th place	
Digital Spy Reader Awards	2011	Born This Way	Best Album	Runner-up	
Digital Spy Reader Awards	2013	Lady Gaga	Best Female Solo Artist	Runner-up	
Digital Spy Reader Awards	2015	Lady Gaga's Gory Sex Scene – American Horror Story: Hotel	Biggest WTF Moment	3rd place	
Digital Spy Reader Awards	2018	A Star Is Born	Best Female Actor	Won	
Digital Spy Reader Awards	2018	"Shallow" (with Bradley Cooper)	Best Song	Won	
Digital Spy Reader Awards	2018	Little Monsters	Best Fanbase	Won	
Do Something! Awards	2010	Lady Gaga	Best Music Artist	Nominated	
Do Something! Awards	2011	Lady Gaga	Best Music Artist	Nominated	
Do Something! Awards	2011	Lady Gaga	Do Something Facebook	Won	
Do Something! Awards	2011	"Born This Way"	Best Charity Song	Nominated	
Do Something! Awards	2012	Lady Gaga	Do Something Twitter	Nominated	
Dorian Awards	2012	Lady Gaga Presents the Monster Ball Tour: At Madison Square Garden	TV Musical Program of the Year	Won (Note: Tied with Glee)	
Dorian Awards	2012	A Very Gaga Thanksgiving	TV Musical Program of the Year	Nominated	
Dorian Awards	2016	The Sound of Music 50th anniversary tribute at the 87th Academy Awards	TV Musical Performance of the Year	Nominated	
Dorian Awards	2017	"Til It Happens to You" at the 88th Academy Awards	TV Musical Performance of the Year	Nominated	
Dorian Awards	2018	"God Bless America", "Born This Way" etc. at the Super Bowl LI	TV Musical Performance of the Year	Nominated	
Dorian Awards	2019	A Star Is Born	Film Performance of the Year — Actress	Nominated	
Dorian Awards	2019	Lady Gaga	Wilde Artist of the Year	Nominated	
Dorian Awards	2020	"Shallow" at the 91st Academy Awards (with Bradley Cooper)	TV Musical Performance of the Year	Won	
Dorian Awards	2020	Lady Gaga	Wilde Artist of the Decade	Won	
Dublin Film Critics' Circle	2018	A Star Is Born	Best Actress	Won	
ECHO Awards	2010	Lady Gaga	International Newcomer	Won	
ECHO Awards	2010	Lady Gaga	International Female Artist	Won	
ECHO Awards	2010	The Fame	International/National Album of the Year	Nominated	
ECHO Awards	2010	"Poker Face"	International/National Song of the Year	Won	
ECHO Awards	2012	Lady Gaga	International Female Artist	Nominated	
Elle's Women in Hollywood	2018	Lady Gaga	Women in Hollywood	Won	
Emma Gaala	2010	Lady Gaga	Foreign Artist of the Year	Nominated	
Emma Gaala	2011	Lady Gaga	Artist of the Year	Nominated	
Emma Gaala	2012	Lady Gaga	Artist of the Year	Nominated	
Emma Gaala	2026	"Abracadabra"	Most Streamed International Song of the Year	Won	
Epica Awards	2025	"Abracadabra": From Fan to Featured	Best Use of Music	Bronze	
Eska Music Awards	2009	Lady Gaga	Best New Artist	Won	
Eska Music Awards	2011	Lady Gaga	Best International Artist	Won	
Fangoria Chainsaw Awards	2016	American Horror Story: Hotel	Best TV Actress	Nominated	
Fashion Los Angeles Awards	2016	Lady Gaga	Editor of the Year	Won	
FiFi Awards	2013	Fame	Media Campaign of the Year – Women's	Nominated	
FiFi Awards	2013	Fame	Consumer Choice – Women's	Nominated	
FiFi Awards (UK)	2013	Fame	Best New Celebrity Fragrance	Runner-up	
FiFi Awards (UK)	2013	Fame	Best New Female Print Advertisement	Runner-up	
FiFi Awards (UK)	2013	Fame	Best New Female Commercial	Nominated	
FiFi Awards (UK)	2013	Fame	Ultimate Launch	Nominated	
Florida Film Critics Circle	2021	House of Gucci	Best Actress	Nominated	
Fryderyk	2019	A Star Is Born (with Bradley Cooper)	Best Foreign Album	Nominated	
GAFFA Awards (Denmark)	2009	Lady Gaga	International Female Artist of the Year	Won	
GAFFA Awards (Denmark)	2009	Lady Gaga	New International Artist of the Year	Nominated	
GAFFA Awards (Denmark)	2009	"Paparazzi"	International Hit of the Year	Nominated	
GAFFA Awards (Denmark)	2011	"Born This Way"	International Video of the Year	Nominated	
GAFFA Awards (Denmark)	2011	Lady Gaga	International Female Artist of the Year	Nominated	
GAFFA Awards (Denmark)	2013	Lady Gaga	International Female Artist of the Year	Nominated	
GAFFA Awards (Denmark)	2016	Lady Gaga	International Female Artist of the Year	Nominated	
GAFFA Awards (Denmark)	2020	"Shallow" (with Bradley Cooper)	International Hit of the Year	Nominated	
GAFFA Awards (Denmark)	2021	Lady Gaga	International Artist of the Year	Nominated	
GAFFA Awards (Denmark)	2025	"Die with a Smile" (with Bruno Mars)	International Single of the Year	Nominated	
GAFFA Awards (Norway)	2016	Joanne	International Album of the Year	Nominated	
GAFFA Awards (Norway)	2016	Lady Gaga	International Artist of the Year	Nominated	
GAFFA Awards (Norway)	2018	"Shallow" (with Bradley Cooper)	International Song of the Year	Nominated	
GAFFA Awards (Sweden)	2016	Joanne	International Album of the Year	Nominated	
GAFFA Awards (Sweden)	2016	Lady Gaga	International Artist of the Year	Nominated	
GAFFA Awards (Sweden)	2019	"Shallow" (with Bradley Cooper)	International Song of the Year	Won	
GAFFA Awards (Sweden)	2021	Lady Gaga	International Artist of the Year	Nominated	
Gaygalan Awards	2010	"Bad Romance"	International Song of the Year	Won	
Gaygalan Awards	2011	"Telephone" (featuring Beyoncé)	International Song of the Year	Won	
Gaygalan Awards	2011	"Alejandro"	International Song of the Year	Nominated	
Gaygalan Awards	2012	"Born This Way"	International Song of the Year	Won	
Gaygalan Awards	2019	"Shallow" (with Bradley Cooper)	Song of the Year	Won	
Georgia Film Critics Association	2015	"Til It Happens to You"	Best Original Song	Nominated	
Georgia Film Critics Association	2019	"Shallow"	Best Original Song	Won	
Georgia Film Critics Association	2019	A Star Is Born	Breakthrough Award	Nominated	
Georgia Film Critics Association	2019	A Star Is Born	Best Actress	Nominated	
Georgia Film Critics Association	2022	House of Gucci	Best Actress	Nominated	
Georgia Film Critics Association	2023	"Hold My Hand"	Best Original Song	Won	
GLAAD Media Awards	2010	Lady Gaga	Outstanding Music Artist	Won	
GLAAD Media Awards	2012	Lady Gaga	Outstanding Music Artist	Won	
GLAAD Media Awards	2014	Lady Gaga	Outstanding Music Artist	Nominated	
GLAAD Media Awards	2017	Lady Gaga	Outstanding Music Artist	Nominated	
GLAAD Media Awards	2021	Lady Gaga	Outstanding Music Artist	Nominated	
GLAAD Media Awards	2026	Lady Gaga	Outstanding Music Artist	Nominated	
Glamour Awards	2010	Lady Gaga	International Musician/Solo Artist	Nominated	
Glamour Awards	2011	Lady Gaga	International Musician/Solo Artist	Nominated	
Glamour Awards	2012	Lady Gaga	International Musician/Solo Artist	Nominated	
Glamour Awards	2013	Lady Gaga	Woman of the Year	Won	
Glamour Awards	2014	Lady Gaga	International Musician/Solo Artist	Nominated	
Glamour Awards	2017	Lady Gaga	International Music Act	Nominated	
Global Awards	2019	Lady Gaga	Best Female	Nominated	
Global Awards	2019	Lady Gaga	Mass Appeal Award	Won	
Global Awards	2019	"Shallow" (with Bradley Cooper)	Best Song	Nominated	
Golden Raspberry Awards	2013	Machete Kills	Worst Supporting Actress	Nominated	
Golden Raspberry Awards	2025	Joker: Folie à Deux	Worst Actress	Nominated	
Golden Raspberry Awards	2025	Joker: Folie à Deux	Worst Screen Combo (shared with Joaquin Phoenix)	Won	
Golden Schmoes Awards	2018	A Star Is Born	Best Actress of the Year	Runner-up	
Golden Schmoes Awards	2018	A Star Is Born	Breakthrough Performance of the Year	Runner-up	
Golden Schmoes Awards	2018	A Star Is Born	Best T&A of the Year	Nominated	
Golden Schmoes Awards	2021	House of Gucci	Best Actress	Won	
Golden Schmoes Awards	2021	House of Gucci	Coolest Character	Nominated	
Golden Schmoes Awards	2021	"Father, son, House of Gucci"	Best Line of the Year	Won	
Golden Schmoes Awards	2021	Lady Gaga	Favorite Celebrity	Nominated	
Golden Schmoes Awards	2022	Top Gun: Maverick	Best Music in a Movie	Runner-up	
Gracie Awards	2012	Lady Gaga: Inside the Outside	Outstanding Documentary	Won	
Grands Prix Sacem	2019	"Shallow" (with Bradley Cooper)	International Work of the Year	Won	
Grindr Unwrapped Awards	2020	"Rain on Me" (with Ariana Grande)	Bop of the Year	Won	
Grindr Unwrapped Awards	2020	"Rain on Me" (with Ariana Grande)	Gay Gasp of the Year	Won	
Grindr Unwrapped Awards	2020	"Rain on Me" (with Ariana Grande)	Most Used Profile Songs	Won	
Grindr Unwrapped Awards	2021	"Rain on Me" (with Ariana Grande)	Most Used Profile Songs	3rd place	
Grindr Unwrapped Awards	2023	"Rain on Me" (with Ariana Grande)	Most Used Profile Songs	4th place	
Grindr Unwrapped Awards	2024	Lady Gaga	Mother of the Year	Runner-up	
Grindr Unwrapped Awards	2025	Lady Gaga	Mother of the Year	Won	
Grindr Unwrapped Awards	2025	Mayhem	Album of the Year	Won	
Grindr Unwrapped Awards	2025	Lady Gaga's concert in Rio de Janeiro	Gay Gasp of the Year	4th place	
Grindr Unwrapped Awards	2025	The Mayhem Ball	Tour of the Year	Won	
Grindr Unwrapped Awards	2025	"Abracadabra"	Song of the Year	Won	
Grindr Unwrapped Awards	2025	"Abracadabra"	Music Video of the Year	Won	
Grindr Unwrapped Awards	2026	"Runway" (with Doechii)	Music Video of the Year	Pending	
Guild of Music Supervisors Awards	2019	"Shallow"	Best Song/Recording Created for a Film	Won	
Guild of Music Supervisors Awards	2023	"Hold My Hand"	Best Song/Recording Created for a Film	Nominated	
Harvard Foundation	2022	Lady Gaga	Artist of the Year	Won	
Hito Music Awards	2010	"Poker Face"	Western Songs of the Year	Won	
Hito Music Awards	2012	"Born This Way"	Western Songs of the Year	Won	
Hito Music Awards	2014	"Applause"	Western Songs of the Year	Won	
Hito Music Awards	2019	"Shallow" (with Bradley Cooper)	Western Songs of the Year	Won	
Hollywood Creative Alliance	2018	A Star Is Born	Best Actress	Nominated	
Hollywood Creative Alliance	2018	A Star Is Born	Best Breakthrough Performance	Nominated	
Hollywood Creative Alliance	2018	"Shallow"	Best Original Song	Won	
Hollywood Creative Alliance	2022	House of Gucci	Best Actress	Nominated	
Hollywood Creative Alliance	2023	"Hold My Hand"	Best Original Song	Nominated	
Hollywood Creative Alliance	2024	Gaga Chromatica Ball	Best Variety Series or Special	Nominated	
Hollywood Music in Media Awards	2015	"Til It Happens to You"	Best Original Song – Documentary	Won	
Hollywood Music in Media Awards	2017	Gaga: Five Foot Two	Music Documentary / Special Program	Nominated	
Hollywood Music in Media Awards	2018	A Star Is Born (with Bradley Cooper)	Best Soundtrack Album	Nominated	
Hollywood Music in Media Awards	2018	"Shallow"	Best Original Song – Feature Film	Won	
Hollywood Music in Media Awards	2022	"Hold My Hand"	Best Original Song – Feature Film	Nominated	
Hollywood Music in Media Awards	2022	Top Gun: Maverick (with OneRepublic, Harold Faltermeyer, Lorne Balfe, Hans Zimmer, Kenny Loggins, Miles Teller)	Best Soundtrack Album	Nominated	
Hollywood Music in Media Awards	2025	"The Dead Dance"	Best Original Song – TV Show/Limited Series	Won	
Hollywood Music Video Awards	2025	"Disease"	Music Video of the Year	Nominated	
Hollywood Music Video Awards	2025	"Disease"	Best Hair & Makeup	Won	
Hollywood Music Video Awards	2025	"Disease"	Best Sci-Fi & Thriller	Nominated	
Hollywood Music Video Awards	2026	"Abracadabra"	Music Video of the Year	Nominated	
Hollywood Music Video Awards	2026	"Abracadabra"	Best Pop	Nominated	
Houston Film Critics Society	2018	A Star Is Born	Best Actress	Nominated	
Houston Film Critics Society	2018	"Shallow"	Best Original Song	Won	
Houston Film Critics Society	2022	"Hold My Hand"	Best Original Song	Nominated	
Huading Awards	2013	Lady Gaga	Chinese Music Fans' Choice Award	Nominated	
Huading Awards	2023	"Hold My Hand"	Best Global Film Song	Nominated	
Hungarian Music Awards	2010	The Fame	Foreign Modern Pop-Rock Album of the Year	Won	
Hungarian Music Awards	2012	Born This Way	Foreign Modern Pop-Rock Album of the Year	Nominated	
Hungarian Music Awards	2019	A Star Is Born (with Bradley Cooper)	Foreign Classic Pop-Rock Album or Record of the Year	Won	
Hungarian Music Awards	2021	Chromatica	Foreign Modern Pop-Rock Album or Record of the Year	Nominated	
Hungarian Music Awards	2025	Harlequin / "Die with a Smile" (with Bruno Mars)	Foreign Classic Pop-Rock Album or Record of the Year	Nominated	
Hungarian Music Awards	2026	Mayhem	Foreign Modern Pop-Rock Album or Record of the Year	Nominated	
IGN Awards	2018	A Star Is Born	Best Lead Performance in a Movie	Runner-up	
iHeartRadio MMVAs	2009	"Poker Face"	International Video of the Year — Artist	Won	
iHeartRadio MMVAs	2009	"Poker Face"	UR Fave International Artist	Nominated	
iHeartRadio MMVAs	2010	"Telephone" (featuring Beyoncé)	International Video of the Year — Artist	Nominated	
iHeartRadio MMVAs	2010	"Telephone" (featuring Beyoncé)	UR Fave International Artist	Nominated	
iHeartRadio MMVAs	2011	"Judas"	International Video of the Year — Artist	Won	
iHeartRadio MMVAs	2011	"Born This Way"	UR Fave International Artist	Won	
iHeartRadio MMVAs	2011	"Alejandro"	Most Streamed Video of the Year	Nominated	
iHeartRadio MMVAs	2012	"Marry the Night"	International Video of the Year — Artist	Nominated	
iHeartRadio MMVAs	2017	Lady Gaga	Most Buzzworthy International Artist or Group	Nominated	
iHeartRadio Music Awards	2014	Little Monsters	Best Fan Army	Nominated	
iHeartRadio Music Awards	2016	"Til It Happens to You"	Best Song from a Movie	Won	
iHeartRadio Music Awards	2016	Lady Gaga	Biggest Triple Threat	Nominated	
iHeartRadio Music Awards	2017	Little Monsters	Best Fan Army	Nominated	
iHeartRadio Music Awards	2019	"Your Song"	Best Cover Song	Nominated	
iHeartRadio Music Awards	2019	Asia	Cutest Musician's Pet	Nominated	
iHeartRadio Music Awards	2019	"I'll Never Love Again"	Song That Left Us Shook	Won	
iHeartRadio Music Awards	2021	"Rain on Me" (with Ariana Grande)	Dance Song of the Year	Nominated	
iHeartRadio Music Awards	2021	"Rain on Me" (with Ariana Grande)	Best Music Video	Nominated	
iHeartRadio Music Awards	2023	Lady Gaga	Favorite Tour Style	Nominated	
iHeartRadio Music Awards	2023	Enigma + Jazz & Piano	Favorite Residency	Nominated	
iHeartRadio Music Awards	2025	Lady Gaga	Innovator Award	Won	
iHeartRadio Music Awards	2025	"Die with a Smile" (with Bruno Mars)	Best Collaboration	Won	
iHeartRadio Music Awards	2025	"Die with a Smile" (with Bruno Mars)	Best Music Video	Nominated	
iHeartRadio Music Awards	2025	Gaga Chromatica Ball	Favorite On Screen	Nominated	
iHeartRadio Music Awards	2026	Lady Gaga	Artist of the Year	Nominated	
iHeartRadio Music Awards	2026	Mayhem	Dance Album of the Year	Won	
iHeartRadio Music Awards	2026	"Abracadabra"	Favorite TikTok Dance	Nominated	
iHeartRadio Music Awards	2026	"Abracadabra"	Best Music Video	Nominated	
iHeartRadio Music Awards	2026	Wednesday	Favorite On Screen	Nominated	
iHeartRadio Music Awards	2026	The Mayhem Ball	Favorite Tour Style	Nominated	
Industry Dance Awards	2017	Lady Gaga	Favorite Pop Star	Nominated	
Industry Dance Awards	2017	Lady Gaga Super Bowl Performance	America's Favorite Performance	Nominated	
International Dance Music Awards	2009	Lady Gaga	Breakthrough Solo Artist	Won	
International Dance Music Awards	2009	"Just Dance" (featuring Colby O'Donis)	Best Pop Dance Track	Won	
International Dance Music Awards	2009	"Just Dance" (featuring Colby O'Donis)	Best Music Video	Nominated	
International Dance Music Awards	2010	Lady Gaga	Best Solo Artist	Won	
International Dance Music Awards	2010	The Fame Monster	Best Album	Nominated	
International Dance Music Awards	2010	"Bad Romance"	Best Music Video	Won	
International Dance Music Awards	2010	"Bad Romance"	Best Pop Dance Track	Nominated	
International Dance Music Awards	2011	Lady Gaga	Best Solo Artist	Won	
International Dance Music Awards	2011	"Telephone" (featuring Beyoncé)	Best Music Video	Nominated	
International Dance Music Awards	2011	"Alejandro"	Best Pop Dance Track	Won	
International Dance Music Awards	2012	Lady Gaga	Best Solo Artist	Nominated	
International Dance Music Awards	2012	"Judas"	Best Music Video	Nominated	
International Dance Music Awards	2012	"Born This Way"	Best Pop Dance Track	Nominated	
International Dance Music Awards	2014	Lady Gaga	Best Solo Artist	Nominated	
International Dance Music Awards	2014	"Applause"	Best Music Video	Nominated	
International Design Excellence Awards	2010	Beats by Dr. Dre's Heartbeats by Lady Gaga	Entertainment	Bronze	
IRMA Number One Awards (Note: The Irish Recorded Music Association (IRMA) introduced its Number One Awards in July 2021 and recognize all albums and singles that have reached the top of the Irish Albums Chart and Irish Singles Chart.)	2025	Mayhem	Number One Album	Won	
Jane Ortner Education Award	2016	Lady Gaga	Jane Ortner Artist Award	Won	
Japan Gold Disc Awards	2010	Lady Gaga	New Artist of the Year (Western)	Won	
Japan Gold Disc Awards	2010	Lady Gaga	Best 3 New Artists (Western)	Won	
Japan Gold Disc Awards	2011	Lady Gaga	Artist of the Year (Western)	Won	
Japan Gold Disc Awards	2012	Lady Gaga	Artist of the Year (Western)	Won	
Japan Gold Disc Awards	2012	Born This Way	Album of the Year (Western)	Won	
Japan Gold Disc Awards	2012	Born This Way	Best 3 Albums (Western)	Won	
Japan Gold Disc Awards	2012	"Born This Way"	Song of the Year by Download (Western)	Won	
Japan Gold Disc Awards	2013	Lady Gaga Presents the Monster Ball Tour: At Madison Square Garden	Best Music Video (Western)	Won	
Japan Gold Disc Awards	2014	Artpop	Best 3 Albums (Western)	Won	
Japan Gold Disc Awards	2015	Cheek to Cheek (with Tony Bennett)	Jazz Album of the Year	Won	
Japan Gold Disc Awards	2021	Chromatica	Album of the Year (Western)	Won	
Japan Gold Disc Awards	2021	Chromatica	Best 3 Albums (Western)	Won	
Japan Gold Disc Awards	2023	Top Gun: Maverick (with Lorne Balfe, Harold Faltermeyer and Hans Zimmer)	Soundtrack Album of the Year	Won	
Japan Gold Disc Awards	2023	"Hold My Hand"	Song of the Year by Download (Western)	Won	
Japan Gold Disc Awards	2026	Mayhem	Album of the Year (Western)	Won	
Japan Gold Disc Awards	2026	Mayhem	Best 3 Albums (Western)	Won	
Japan Gold Disc Awards	2026	"Abracadabra"	Song of the Year by Streaming (Western)	Won	
Japan Newspaper Publishers and Editors Association	2015	Shiseido's 50 Selfies of Lady Gaga	Newspaper Advertising Award	Won	
Juice TV Awards	2011	"Born This Way"	Video of the Year	Nominated	
Juno Awards	2012	Born This Way	International Album of the Year	Nominated	
Jupiter Awards	2019	A Star Is Born	Best International Actress	Nominated	
KKBox Music Awards	2011	The Fame Monster	Western Album of the Year	Won	
KKBox Music Awards	2023	Lady Gaga	Top 100 Singers of the Year	Won	
KKBox Music Awards	2026	Lady Gaga	Top 100 Singers of the Year	Won	
Las Culturistas Culture Awards	2023	Lady Gaga as Harley Quinn	Biggest Jester	Won	
Las Culturistas Culture Awards	2023	Lady Gaga on Any Awards Show Doing "Jo Calderone"	Kimberly Akimbo Award for Best Indoor Performance	Nominated	
Las Culturistas Culture Awards	2024	Lady Gaga in 2016	CMA Award for Best Person That's Country Now	Nominated	
Las Culturistas Culture Awards	2024	Lady Gaga, please, for the Joker: Folie à Deux press tour, Las Cultch! 90 minutes!	Shot We Are Shooting Right Now, in This Moment	Won	
Las Culturistas Culture Awards	2024	Lady Gaga – 5'2"	Eva Longoria Award for Tiny Woman, Huge Impact	Nominated	
Las Culturistas Culture Awards	2025	Mirror house, "Abracadabra" – Lady Gaga (SNL)	Most Iconic Building or Structure	Nominated	
Las Culturistas Culture Awards	2025	Gagachella	Social Change Moment of the Year	Won	
Las Culturistas Culture Awards	2025	Gagachella	Santa Award for Being Unforgettable	Nominated	
Las Culturistas Culture Awards	2025	Gagachella	Jamie Lee Curtis Award for Gusto, Enthusiasm and Individuality	Nominated	
Las Culturistas Culture Awards	2025	Gagachella Bootleg from Videomoon.cn	Best Movie of All Time	Nominated	
Las Culturistas Culture Awards	2025	"Killah" – Lady Gaga (SNL)	The Sweat Tour Award for Best Live Indoor Performance	Nominated	
Las Culturistas Culture Awards	2025	Bowen Yang, Lady Gaga – "No More Slay" (SNL)	The Sweat Tour Award for Best Live Indoor Performance	Nominated	
Las Culturistas Culture Awards	2025	Mayhem	Album of the Year	Won	
Las Culturistas Culture Awards	2025	"Abracadabra"	Record of the Year	Won	
Las Culturistas Culture Awards	2025	"Gaga!!!!!!!!!"	Best Word to Scream	Nominated	
Las Culturistas Culture Awards	2025	Lady Gaga – "Put your paws (hands) up"	Best Hand Moment, Excellence in Hands	Nominated	
Las Culturistas Culture Awards	2026	Gaga: Five Foot Two	Best Movie of All Time	Won	
Las Culturistas Culture Awards	2026	Chromatica	Best Space – Excellence in Outer Space	Won	
Las Vegas Film Critics Society	2018	A Star Is Born	Best Actress	Won	
Las Vegas Film Critics Society	2018	"Shallow"	Best Song	Won	
LennonOno Grant for Peace	2012	Lady Gaga	Lennon Ono Grant for Peace Award	Won	
Little Kids Rock	2011	Lady Gaga	Big Man of the Year	Won	
The Lockdown Awards	2020	Andrea Bocelli, Celine Dion, John Legend, Lady Gaga & Lang Lang – "The Prayer" (One World: Together at Home)	Stronger Together: Favorite Group / All-Star Performance	Won	
The Lockdown Awards	2020	Lady Gaga – "Smile" (One World: Together at Home)	The Room Where It Happens: Favorite Home Performance	Nominated	
Los 40 Music Awards	2009	"Poker Face"	Best International Song	Nominated	
Los 40 Music Awards	2010	"Bad Romance"	Best International Song	Won	
Los 40 Music Awards	2010	Lady Gaga	Best International Artist	Won	
Los 40 Music Awards	2020	Chromatica	Best International Album	Nominated	
Los 40 Music Awards	2020	"Rain on Me" (with Ariana Grande)	Best International Video	Nominated	
Los 40 Music Awards	2020	Lady Gaga	Best International Artist	Nominated	
Los 40 Music Awards	2025	Lady Gaga	Best International Artist	Nominated	
Los 40 Music Awards	2025	Mayhem	Best International Album	Nominated	
Los Angeles Italia Film Festival	2016	"Til It Happens to You"	Song of the Year	Won	
Los Premios MTV Latinoamérica	2009	Lady Gaga	Best Pop Artist International	Nominated	
Los Premios MTV Latinoamérica	2009	Lady Gaga	Best New Artist International	Won	
Los Premios MTV Latinoamérica	2009	"Poker Face"	Song of the Year	Won	
Los Premios MTV Latinoamérica	2009	"Poker Face"	Best Ringtone	Nominated	
Lumiere Awards	2023	"Hold My Hand"	Best Original Song	Won	
Lunas del Auditorio	2011	Lady Gaga	Foreign Language Pop	Nominated	
Lunas del Auditorio	2013	Lady Gaga	Foreign Language Pop	Nominated	
Melon Music Awards	2025	Lady Gaga	Best Pop Artist	Nominated	
Meteor Music Awards	2010	Lady Gaga	Best International Female	Won	
Meteor Music Awards	2010	The Fame Monster	Best International Album	Nominated	
Meus Prêmios Nick	2010	Lady Gaga	Favorite International Artist	Nominated	
Meus Prêmios Nick	2019	"Shallow" (with Bradley Cooper)	Favorite International Hit	Nominated	
Miss Gay America	2017	Lady Gaga	The Honorary Miss Gay America	Won	
Mnet Asian Music Awards	2009	Lady Gaga	Best Global Performance	Won	
MOBO Awards	2009	Lady Gaga	Best International Act	Nominated	
MTV Australia Awards	2009	Lady Gaga	Breakthrough Artist	Nominated	
MTV Australia Awards	2009	"Poker Face"	Best Video	Nominated	
MTV Europe Music Awards	2009	Lady Gaga	Best New Act	Won	
MTV Europe Music Awards	2009	Lady Gaga	Best Female	Nominated	
MTV Europe Music Awards	2009	Lady Gaga	Best World Stage Performance	Nominated	
MTV Europe Music Awards	2009	Lady Gaga	Best Live Act	Nominated	
MTV Europe Music Awards	2009	"Poker Face"	Best Song	Nominated	
MTV Europe Music Awards	2010	Lady Gaga	Best Female	Won	
MTV Europe Music Awards	2010	Lady Gaga	Best Live Act	Nominated	
MTV Europe Music Awards	2010	Lady Gaga	Best Pop	Won	
MTV Europe Music Awards	2010	"Bad Romance"	Best Song	Won	
MTV Europe Music Awards	2010	"Telephone" (featuring Beyoncé)	Best Video	Nominated	
MTV Europe Music Awards	2011	Lady Gaga	Best Female	Won	
MTV Europe Music Awards	2011	Lady Gaga	Best Live Act	Nominated	
MTV Europe Music Awards	2011	Lady Gaga	Best North America Act	Nominated	
MTV Europe Music Awards	2011	Lady Gaga	Best Pop	Nominated	
MTV Europe Music Awards	2011	Lady Gaga	Biggest Fans	Won	
MTV Europe Music Awards	2011	"Born This Way"	Best Song	Won	
MTV Europe Music Awards	2011	"Born This Way"	Best Video	Won	
MTV Europe Music Awards	2012	Lady Gaga	Best Live Act	Nominated	
MTV Europe Music Awards	2012	"Marry the Night"	Best Video	Nominated	
MTV Europe Music Awards	2012	Lady Gaga	Biggest Fans	Nominated	
MTV Europe Music Awards	2013	Lady Gaga	Best Female	Nominated	
MTV Europe Music Awards	2013	Lady Gaga	Best Look	Nominated	
MTV Europe Music Awards	2013	Lady Gaga	Biggest Fans	Nominated	
MTV Europe Music Awards	2013	"Applause"	Best Video	Nominated	
MTV Europe Music Awards	2015	Lady Gaga and Tony Bennett	Best Live Act	Nominated	
MTV Europe Music Awards	2016	Lady Gaga	Best Female	Won	
MTV Europe Music Awards	2016	Lady Gaga	Best Look	Won	
MTV Europe Music Awards	2016	Lady Gaga	Biggest Fans	Nominated	
MTV Europe Music Awards	2020	Lady Gaga	Best Artist	Won	
MTV Europe Music Awards	2020	Lady Gaga	Best Pop	Nominated	
MTV Europe Music Awards	2020	Lady Gaga	Best US Act	Won	
MTV Europe Music Awards	2020	Lady Gaga	Biggest Fans	Nominated	
MTV Europe Music Awards	2020	"Rain on Me" (with Ariana Grande)	Best Video	Nominated	
MTV Europe Music Awards	2020	"Rain on Me" (with Ariana Grande)	Best Song	Nominated	
MTV Europe Music Awards	2020	"Rain on Me" (with Ariana Grande)	Best Collaboration	Nominated	
MTV Europe Music Awards	2021	Lady Gaga	Best Artist	Nominated	
MTV Europe Music Awards	2021	Lady Gaga	Biggest Fans	Nominated	
MTV Europe Music Awards	2022	Lady Gaga	Best Live	Nominated	
MTV Europe Music Awards	2022	Lady Gaga	Biggest Fans	Nominated	
MTV Europe Music Awards	2024	"Die with a Smile" (with Bruno Mars)	Best Collaboration	Nominated	
MTV Fandom Awards	2015	Lady Gaga Joins American Horror Story: Hotel	Feels Freak Out of the Year	Nominated	
MTV Italian Music Awards	2010	Lady Gaga	My First Lady Award	Nominated	
MTV Italian Music Awards	2010	Lady Gaga	TRL Award for Best Look	Nominated	
MTV Italian Music Awards	2011	Lady Gaga	Wonder Woman Award	Won	
MTV Italian Music Awards	2011	Lady Gaga	Best Look	Nominated	
MTV Italian Music Awards	2011	Lady Gaga	Too Much Award	Nominated	
MTV Italian Music Awards	2012	Lady Gaga	Wonder Woman Award	Nominated	
MTV Italian Music Awards	2012	Lady Gaga	Best Look	Nominated	
MTV Italian Music Awards	2015	Lady Gaga	Best Fan	Nominated	
MTV Italian Music Awards	2015	Lady Gaga	MTV Awards Star	Won	
MTV Italian Music Awards	2016	Lady Gaga	Artist Saga	Nominated	
MTV Italian Music Awards	2016	Lady Gaga	Best Look	Nominated	
MTV Italian Music Awards	2016	Lady Gaga	MTV Awards Star	Nominated	
MTV Italian Music Awards	2017	Lady Gaga	Best International Female	Nominated	
MTV Italian Music Awards	2017	Lady Gaga	Artist Saga	Nominated	
MTV MIAW Awards	2017	"Perfect Illusion"	International Hit of the Year	Won	
MTV MIAW Awards	2017	Lady Gaga	Agente de Cambio	Won	
MTV MIAW Awards	2019	"Shallow" (with Bradley Cooper)	Global Hit	Nominated	
MTV MIAW Awards	2019	Asia	Instapets	Nominated	
MTV MIAW Awards	2023	"Bloody Mary"	Viral Anthem	Nominated	
MTV MIAW Awards Brazil	2019	Little Monsters	Fandom of the Year	Nominated	
MTV MIAW Awards Brazil	2019	Lady Gaga and Bradley Cooper	Ship of the Year	Nominated	
MTV MIAW Awards Brazil	2019	"Shallow" (with Bradley Cooper)	Global Hit	Won	
MTV MIAW Awards Brazil	2020	"Rain on Me" (with Ariana Grande)	Global Hit	Won	
MTV MIAW Awards Brazil	2020	"Rain on Me" (with Ariana Grande)	International Collaboration	Nominated	
MTV MIAW Awards Brazil	2020	"Sour Candy" (with Blackpink)	International Collaboration	Won	
MTV MIAW Awards Brazil	2020	Little Monsters	Fandom of the Year	Nominated	
MTV MIAW Awards Brazil	2021	Little Monsters	Fandom of the Year	Nominated	
MTV Movie & TV Awards	2017	"Lady Gaga Carpool Karaoke" — The Late Late Show with James Corden	Trending	Nominated	
MTV Movie & TV Awards	2018	Gaga: Five Foot Two	Best Music Documentary	Won	
MTV Movie & TV Awards	2019	A Star Is Born	Best Performance in a Movie	Won	
MTV Movie & TV Awards	2019	"Shallow" (with Bradley Cooper)	Best Musical Moment	Won	
MTV Movie & TV Awards	2022	House of Gucci	Best Performance in a Movie	Nominated	
MTV Movie & TV Awards	2023	"Hold My Hand"	Best Song	Nominated	
MTV Video Music Awards	2009	"Poker Face"	Best New Artist	Won	
MTV Video Music Awards	2009	"Poker Face"	Video of the Year	Nominated	
MTV Video Music Awards	2009	"Poker Face"	Best Female Video	Nominated	
MTV Video Music Awards	2009	"Poker Face"	Best Pop Video	Nominated	
MTV Video Music Awards	2009	"Paparazzi"	Best Direction	Nominated	
MTV Video Music Awards	2009	"Paparazzi"	Best Editing	Nominated	
MTV Video Music Awards	2009	"Paparazzi"	Best Special Effects	Won	
MTV Video Music Awards	2009	"Paparazzi"	Best Cinematography	Nominated	
MTV Video Music Awards	2009	"Paparazzi"	Best Art Direction	Won	
MTV Video Music Awards	2010	"Bad Romance"	Video of the Year	Won	
MTV Video Music Awards	2010	"Bad Romance"	Best Female Video	Won	
MTV Video Music Awards	2010	"Bad Romance"	Best Pop Video	Won	
MTV Video Music Awards	2010	"Bad Romance"	Best Dance Video	Won	
MTV Video Music Awards	2010	"Bad Romance"	Best Art Direction	Nominated	
MTV Video Music Awards	2010	"Bad Romance"	Best Choreography	Won	
MTV Video Music Awards	2010	"Bad Romance"	Best Cinematography	Nominated	
MTV Video Music Awards	2010	"Bad Romance"	Best Direction	Won	
MTV Video Music Awards	2010	"Bad Romance"	Best Editing	Won	
MTV Video Music Awards	2010	"Bad Romance"	Best Special Effects	Nominated	
MTV Video Music Awards	2010	"Telephone" (featuring Beyoncé)	Video of the Year	Nominated	
MTV Video Music Awards	2010	"Telephone" (featuring Beyoncé)	Best Collaboration	Won	
MTV Video Music Awards	2010	"Telephone" (featuring Beyoncé)	Best Choreography	Nominated	
MTV Video Music Awards	2011	"Born This Way"	Best Female Video	Won	
MTV Video Music Awards	2011	"Born This Way"	Best Video with a Message	Won	
MTV Video Music Awards	2011	"Judas"	Best Choreography	Nominated	
MTV Video Music Awards	2011	"Judas"	Best Art Direction	Nominated	
MTV Video Music Awards	2019	"Shallow" (with Bradley Cooper)	Song of the Year	Nominated	
MTV Video Music Awards	2019	"Shallow" (with Bradley Cooper)	Best Collaboration	Nominated	
MTV Video Music Awards	2020	Lady Gaga	Tricon Award	Won	
MTV Video Music Awards	2020	Lady Gaga	Artist of the Year	Won	
MTV Video Music Awards	2020	"Rain on Me" (with Ariana Grande)	Video of the Year	Nominated	
MTV Video Music Awards	2020	"Rain on Me" (with Ariana Grande)	Song of the Year	Won	
MTV Video Music Awards	2020	"Rain on Me" (with Ariana Grande)	Best Collaboration	Won	
MTV Video Music Awards	2020	"Rain on Me" (with Ariana Grande)	Best Pop	Nominated	
MTV Video Music Awards	2020	"Rain on Me" (with Ariana Grande)	Best Cinematography	Won	
MTV Video Music Awards	2020	"Rain on Me" (with Ariana Grande)	Best Visual Effects	Nominated	
MTV Video Music Awards	2020	"Rain on Me" (with Ariana Grande)	Best Choreography	Nominated	
MTV Video Music Awards	2020	"Smile" from One World: Together at Home	Best Quarantine Performance	Nominated	
MTV Video Music Awards	2021	"911"	Best Cinematography	Nominated	
MTV Video Music Awards	2021	"911"	Best Art Direction	Nominated	
MTV Video Music Awards	2024	"Paparazzi"	VMAs Most Iconic Performance	Nominated	
MTV Video Music Awards	2025	"Die with a Smile" (with Bruno Mars)	Video of the Year	Nominated	
MTV Video Music Awards	2025	"Die with a Smile" (with Bruno Mars)	Song of the Year	Nominated	
MTV Video Music Awards	2025	"Die with a Smile" (with Bruno Mars)	Best Collaboration	Won	
MTV Video Music Awards	2025	"Die with a Smile" (with Bruno Mars)	Best Pop	Nominated	
MTV Video Music Awards	2025	Lady Gaga	Artist of the Year	Won	
MTV Video Music Awards	2025	Mayhem	Best Album	Nominated	
MTV Video Music Awards	2025	"Abracadabra"	Best Direction	Won	
MTV Video Music Awards	2025	"Abracadabra"	Best Art Direction	Won	
MTV Video Music Awards	2025	"Abracadabra"	Best Cinematography	Nominated	
MTV Video Music Awards	2025	"Abracadabra"	Best Editing	Nominated	
MTV Video Music Awards	2025	"Abracadabra"	Best Choreography	Nominated	
MTV Video Music Awards	2025	"Abracadabra"	Best Visual Effects	Nominated	
MTV Video Music Awards	2026	"Runway" (with Doechii)	Best Dance	Nominated	
MTV Video Music Awards	2026	"Runway" (with Doechii)	Best Art Direction	Nominated	
MTV Video Music Awards Japan	2010	"Poker Face"	Video of the Year	Nominated	
MTV Video Music Awards Japan	2010	"Poker Face"	Best Female Video	Nominated	
MTV Video Music Awards Japan	2010	"Poker Face"	Best Dance Video	Won	
MTV Video Music Awards Japan	2010	"Poker Face"	Best Karaoke Song	Nominated	
MTV Video Music Awards Japan	2010	"Video Phone" (with Beyoncé)	Best Collaboration	Nominated	
MTV Video Music Awards Japan	2011	"Born This Way"	Video of the Year	Won	
MTV Video Music Awards Japan	2011	"Born This Way"	Best Dance Video	Won	
MTV Video Music Awards Japan	2011	"Born This Way"	Best Female Video	Won	
MTV Video Music Awards Japan	2012	Born This Way	Album of the Year	Nominated	
MTV Video Music Awards Japan	2012	"You and I"	Video of the Year	Nominated	
MTV Video Music Awards Japan	2012	"Judas"	Best Karaoke Song	Nominated	
MTV Video Music Awards Japan	2014	"Applause"	Video of the Year	Nominated	
MTV Video Music Awards Japan	2014	"Applause"	Best Pop Video	Won	
MTV Video Music Awards Japan	2025	"Disease"	Video of the Year	Nominated	
MTV Video Music Awards Japan	2025	"Disease"	Best Solo Artist Video (International)	Won	
MTV Video Music Brazil	2009	Lady Gaga	Best International Artist	Nominated	
MTV Video Music Brazil	2010	Lady Gaga	Best International Artist	Nominated	
MTV Video Music Brazil	2011	Lady Gaga	Best International Artist	Won	
MTV Video Play Awards	2010	"Bad Romance"	Platinum Videos	Won	
MTV Video Play Awards	2010	"Alejandro"	Platinum Videos	Won	
MTV Video Play Awards	2010	"Telephone" (featuring Beyoncé)	Platinum Videos	Won	
MTV Video Play Awards	2011	"Born This Way"	Platinum Videos	Won	
MTV Video Play Awards	2011	"You and I"	Platinum Videos	Won	
MTV Video Play Awards	2011	"The Edge of Glory"	Platinum Videos	Won	
MTV Video Play Awards	2012	"Marry the Night"	Most Played Music Videos	Won	
MTV Video Play Awards	2019	"Shallow" (with Bradley Cooper)	Most Played Music Videos	Won	
MTV Video Play Awards	2020	"Rain on Me" (with Ariana Grande)	Most Played Music Videos	Won	
Musa Awards	2024	"Die with a Smile" (with Bruno Mars)	International Anglo Song of the Year	Won	
Musa Awards	2024	"Die with a Smile" (with Bruno Mars)	International Collaboration of the Year	Won	
Music Awards Japan	2025	"Die with a Smile" (with Bruno Mars)	Best International Pop Song in Japan	Nominated	
Music Awards Japan	2025	"Die with a Smile" (with Bruno Mars)	Best of Listeners' Choice: International Song	Nominated	
Music Awards Japan	2026	"Abracadabra"	Best International Pop Song in Japan	Won	
Music Awards Japan	2026	"Abracadabra"	Best of Listeners' Choice: International Song	Nominated	
Musikförläggarnas pris	2010	"Bad Romance"	Song of the Year	Won	
Musikförläggarnas pris	2010	"Bad Romance"	Most Played Song of the Year	Won	
MVPA Awards	2009	"Bad Romance"	Best Pop Video	Won	
Myx Music Awards	2011	"Telephone" (featuring Beyoncé)	Favorite International Video	Nominated	
Myx Music Awards	2012	"Born This Way"	Favorite International Video	Nominated	
Myx Music Awards	2021	"Rain on Me" (with Ariana Grande)	Favorite International Video	Nominated	
National Arts Awards	2015	Lady Gaga	Young Artist Award	Won	
National Board of Review Awards	2018	A Star Is Born	Best Actress	Won	
New Music Awards	2009	Lady Gaga	Top 40 Female Artist	Won	
New Music Awards	2019	"Shallow" (with Bradley Cooper)	AC Single of the Year	Won	
New Music Awards	2019	Lady Gaga and Bradley Cooper	AC New Group of the Year	Won	
New Music Awards	2021	Lady Gaga and Ariana Grande	Top 40 Group of the Year	Won	
New Music Awards	2025	"Die with a Smile" (with Bruno Mars)	AC Song of the Year	Nominated	
New Music Awards	2026	"Abracadabra"	Top 40/CHR Song of the Year	Nominated	
New Music Awards	2026	Lady Gaga	Top 40/CHR Female Artist of the Year	Nominated	
New York Academy of Medicine	2019	Born This Way Foundation	Bold and Brave Award	Won	
New York Festivals	2012	Lady Gaga: Born This Way Backstage Acapella Featurette	Music Video: Low Budget	Gold	
New York Festivals	2012	Lady Gaga Born This Way Countdown Spot	Best Graphic Design	Nominated	
New York Festivals	2017	The Lady Gaga + Intel Performance	Use of Activation & Engagement: Sponsorships/Partnerships	Bronze	
New York Festivals	2017	The Lady Gaga + Intel Performance	Use of Activation & Engagement: Broadcast in a Promotional Campaign	Bronze	
New York Festivals	2021	One World: Together at Home	Entertainment Special: Variety Special	Gold	
New York Festivals	2021	One World: Together at Home	Entertainment Special: Special Event	Gold	
New York Festivals	2021	One World: Together at Home	Entertainment Program: Variety	Nominated	
New York Festivals	2025	"Abracadabra": From Fan to Featured	Branded Content/Entertainment: Best Use (User-Generated Content)	Grand	
New York Festivals	2025	"Abracadabra": From Fan to Featured	Branded Content/Entertainment: Best Use (User-Generated Content)	Gold	
New York Festivals	2025	"Abracadabra": From Fan to Featured	Collaborations & Partnerships: Best Use (Celebrity/Influencer)	Gold	
New York Festivals	2025	"Abracadabra": From Fan to Featured	Activation & Engagement: Best Use (Community Building)	Silver	
New York Film Critics Circle	2021	House of Gucci	Best Actress	Won	
NewNowNext Awards	2008	"Just Dance" (featuring Colby O'Donis)	Brink of Fame Song Award	Nominated	
NewNowNext Awards	2011	Lady Gaga	Always Next, Forever Now Award	Won	
NewNowNext Awards	2013	Born This Way Foundation	Most Innovative Charity of the Year	Won	
Nickelodeon Australian Kids' Choice Awards	2010	"Telephone" (featuring Beyoncé)	Favorite Song	Nominated	
Nickelodeon Australian Kids' Choice Awards	2011	Lady Gaga	Favorite Female Singer	Nominated	
Nickelodeon Mexico Kids' Choice Awards	2019	Lady Gaga	Favorite International Artist or Group	Nominated	
Nickelodeon Kids' Choice Awards	2010	Lady Gaga	Favorite Female Singer	Nominated	
Nickelodeon Kids' Choice Awards	2010	"Paparazzi"	Favorite Song	Nominated	
Nickelodeon Kids' Choice Awards	2012	"Born This Way"	Favorite Song	Nominated	
Nickelodeon Kids' Choice Awards	2012	Lady Gaga	Favorite Female Singer	Nominated	
Nickelodeon Kids' Choice Awards	2014	Lady Gaga	Favorite Female Singer	Nominated	
Nickelodeon Kids' Choice Awards	2021	"Rain on Me" (with Ariana Grande)	Favorite Music Collaboration	Nominated	
Nickelodeon Kids' Choice Awards	2022	Lady Gaga	Favorite Female Artist	Nominated	
Nickelodeon Kids' Choice Awards	2023	Lady Gaga	Favorite Female Artist	Nominated	
Nickelodeon Kids' Choice Awards	2025	Lady Gaga	Favorite Female Artist	Nominated	
Nickelodeon Kids' Choice Awards	2025	"Abracadabra"	Favorite Song	Nominated	
Nickelodeon Kids' Choice Awards	2025	"Die with a Smile" (with Bruno Mars)	Favorite Music Collaboration	Nominated	
Nickelodeon Kids' Choice Awards	2025	Mayhem	Favorite Album	Nominated	
Nickelodeon Kids' Choice Awards	2026	"Runway" (with Doechii)	Favorite Song from a Movie	Nominated	
NME Awards	2010	Lady Gaga	Best Solo Artist	Nominated	
NME Awards	2010	Lady Gaga	Villain of the Year	Nominated	
NME Awards	2010	Lady Gaga	Best Dressed	Won	
NME Awards	2010	Lady Gaga	Worst Dressed	Won	
NME Awards	2010	"Poker Face"	Best Dancefloor Filler	Nominated	
NME Awards	2010	The Fame	Worst Album	Nominated	
NME Awards	2011	Lady Gaga	Hero of the Year	Won	
NME Awards	2011	Lady Gaga	Most Stylish	Nominated	
NME Awards	2011	Lady Gaga	Least Stylish	Nominated	
NME Awards	2011	Lady Gaga	Hottest Woman	Nominated	
NME Awards	2012	Lady Gaga	Villain of the Year	Nominated	
NME Awards	2012	Born This Way	Worst Album	Nominated	
NME Awards	2012	Lady Gaga	Best Band Blog or Twitter	Won	
NME Awards	2017	Lady Gaga	Best International Female	Nominated	
NME Awards	2018	Lady Gaga at the Super Bowl	Music Moment of the Year	Nominated	
NME Awards	2018	Gaga: Five Foot Two	Best Music Film	Won	
NRJ Music Awards	2010	Lady Gaga	International Breakthrough of the Year	Won	
NRJ Music Awards	2010	The Fame	International Album of the Year	Nominated	
NRJ Music Awards	2010	"Poker Face"	International Song of the Year	Nominated	
NRJ Music Awards	2011	Lady Gaga	International Female Artist of the Year	Nominated	
NRJ Music Awards	2011	Lady Gaga	Live Act of the Year	Nominated	
NRJ Music Awards	2011	"Bad Romance"	International Song of the Year	Nominated	
NRJ Music Awards	2011	"Telephone" (featuring Beyoncé)	International Band/Collaboration/Company of the Year	Nominated	
NRJ Music Awards	2011	"Telephone" (featuring Beyoncé)	Music Video of the Year	Won	
NRJ Music Awards	2012	"Born This Way"	Music Video of the Year	Nominated	
NRJ Music Awards	2016	Lady Gaga	International Female Artist of the Year	Nominated	
NRJ Music Awards	2019	Lady Gaga	International Female Artist of the Year	Nominated	
NRJ Music Awards	2019	Lady Gaga and Bradley Cooper	International Duo/Group of the Year	Won	
NRJ Music Awards	2020	Lady Gaga	International Female Artist of the Year	Nominated	
NRJ Music Awards	2020	"Rain on Me" (with Ariana Grande)	International Collaboration of the Year	Won	
NRJ Music Awards	2020	"Rain on Me" (with Ariana Grande)	Music Video of the Year	Nominated	
NRJ Music Awards	2022	Lady Gaga	International Female Artist of the Year	Won	
NRJ Music Awards	2024	"Die with a Smile" (with Bruno Mars)	International Collaboration of the Year	Won	
NRJ Music Awards	2025	Lady Gaga	International Female Artist of the Year	Won	
NRJ Music Awards	2025	"Abracadabra"	International Hit of the Year	Nominated	
Nylon Nights Awards	2025	The Mayhem Ball	Tour of the Year	Won	
O Music Awards	2011	Lady Gaga	Innovative Artist	Won	
O Music Awards	2011	Lady Gaga	Must Follow Artist on Twitter	Won	
O Music Awards	2011	Lady Gaga	Favorite Animated GIF	Nominated	
O Music Awards	2011	Lady Gaga	Fan Army FTW	Nominated	
The Official Charts Number One Awards (Note: The Number One Award for singles was first introduced by the Official Charts Company (OCC) in December 2011, followed by the introduction of the Number One Award for albums in 2015.)	2018	Number One Single	"Shallow" (with Bradley Cooper)	Won	
The Official Charts Number One Awards	2020	Number One Single	"Rain on Me" (with Ariana Grande)	Won	
The Official Charts Number One Awards	2020	Number One Album	Chromatica	Won	
The Official Charts Number One Awards	2025	Number One Album	Mayhem	Won	
The Official Charts Specialist Number One Awards (Note: The Specialist Number One Awards were launched in January 2021. These awards recognize all number one albums and singles that have reached the top of any OCC chart, excluding the Official Singles and Official Albums charts, for any prior years.)
The Official Charts Specialist Number One Awards	2009	The Fame	Number One Album Downloads	Won	
The Official Charts Specialist Number One Awards	2009	The Fame	Number One Physical Albums	Won	
The Official Charts Specialist Number One Awards	2009	The Fame	Number One Scottish Albums	Won	
The Official Charts Specialist Number One Awards	2009	"Just Dance" (featuring Colby O'Donis)	Number One Singles Downloads	Won	
The Official Charts Specialist Number One Awards	2009	"Poker Face"	Number One Singles Downloads	Won	
The Official Charts Specialist Number One Awards	2009	"Paparazzi"	Number One Physical Singles	Won	
The Official Charts Specialist Number One Awards	2009	"Bad Romance"	Number One Singles Downloads	Won	
The Official Charts Specialist Number One Awards	2010	The Remix	Number One Album Downloads	Won	
The Official Charts Specialist Number One Awards	2010	"Telephone" (featuring Beyoncé)	Number One Singles Downloads	Won	
The Official Charts Specialist Number One Awards	2010	"Telephone" (featuring Beyoncé)	Number One Physical Singles	Won	
The Official Charts Specialist Number One Awards	2011	Born This Way	Number One Album Downloads	Won	
The Official Charts Specialist Number One Awards	2011	Born This Way	Number One Physical Albums	Won	
The Official Charts Specialist Number One Awards	2011	Born This Way	Number One Scottish Albums	Won	
The Official Charts Specialist Number One Awards	2011	"Judas"	Number One Physical Singles	Won	
The Official Charts Specialist Number One Awards	2013	Artpop	Number One Album Downloads	Won	
The Official Charts Specialist Number One Awards	2013	Artpop	Number One Scottish Albums	Won	
The Official Charts Specialist Number One Awards	2013	"Applause"	Number One Physical Singles	Won	
The Official Charts Specialist Number One Awards	2014	Cheek to Cheek (with Tony Bennett)	Number One Jazz & Blues Albums	Won	
The Official Charts Specialist Number One Awards	2016	Joanne	Number One Album Downloads	Won	
The Official Charts Specialist Number One Awards	2018	"Shallow" (with Bradley Cooper)	Number One Singles Sales	Won	
The Official Charts Specialist Number One Awards	2018	"Shallow" (with Bradley Cooper)	Number One Singles Downloads	Won	
The Official Charts Specialist Number One Awards	2020	Chromatica	Number One Albums Streaming	Won	
The Official Charts Specialist Number One Awards	2020	Chromatica	Number One Albums Sales	Won	
The Official Charts Specialist Number One Awards	2020	Chromatica	Number One Album Downloads	Won	
The Official Charts Specialist Number One Awards	2020	Chromatica	Number One Physical Albums	Won	
The Official Charts Specialist Number One Awards	2020	Chromatica	Number One Vinyl Albums	Won	
The Official Charts Specialist Number One Awards	2020	Chromatica	Number One Scottish Albums	Won	
The Official Charts Specialist Number One Awards	2020	"Stupid Love"	Number One Singles Sales	Won	
The Official Charts Specialist Number One Awards	2020	"Stupid Love"	Number One Singles Downloads	Won	
The Official Charts Specialist Number One Awards	2020	"Rain on Me" (with Ariana Grande)	Number One Streaming	Won	
The Official Charts Specialist Number One Awards	2020	"Rain on Me" (with Ariana Grande)	Number One Video Streaming	Won	
The Official Charts Specialist Number One Awards	2020	"Rain on Me" (with Ariana Grande)	Number One Singles Sales	Won	
The Official Charts Specialist Number One Awards	2020	"Rain on Me" (with Ariana Grande)	Number One Singles Downloads	Won	
The Official Charts Specialist Number One Awards	2021	Love for Sale (with Tony Bennett)	Number One Jazz & Blues Albums	Won	
The Official Charts Specialist Number One Awards	2024	Harlequin	Number One Jazz & Blues Albums	Won	
The Official Charts Specialist Number One Awards	2024	"Die with a Smile" (with Bruno Mars)	Number One Singles Sales	Won	
The Official Charts Specialist Number One Awards	2024	"Die with a Smile" (with Bruno Mars)	Number One Singles Downloads	Won	
The Official Charts Specialist Number One Awards	2025	Mayhem	Number One Albums Sales	Won	
The Official Charts Specialist Number One Awards	2025	Mayhem	Number One Album Downloads	Won	
The Official Charts Specialist Number One Awards	2025	Mayhem	Number One Physical Albums	Won	
The Official Charts Specialist Number One Awards	2025	Mayhem	Number One Vinyl Albums	Won	
The Official Charts Specialist Number One Awards	2025	Mayhem	Number One Record Store	Won	
The Official Charts Specialist Number One Awards	2025	Mayhem	Number One Scottish Albums	Won	
The Official Vodafone Big Top 40 Number One Awards (Note: The Official Vodafone Big Top 40 Number One Awards were introduced in 2009 and are given to artists who top the Big Top 40 chart.)	2009	"Bad Romance"	Number One Award	Won	
The Official Vodafone Big Top 40 Number One Awards	2010	"Telephone" (featuring Beyoncé)	Number One Award	Won	
The Official Vodafone Big Top 40 Number One Awards	2011	"Born This Way"	Number One Award	Won	
The Official Vodafone Big Top 40 Number One Awards	2017	"The Cure"	Number One Award	Won	
The Official Vodafone Big Top 40 Number One Awards	2020	"Stupid Love"	Number One Award	Won	
The Official Vodafone Big Top 40 Number One Awards	2020	"Rain on Me" (with Ariana Grande)	Number One Award	Won	
The Official Vodafone Big Top 40 Number One Awards	2024	"Die with a Smile" (with Bruno Mars)	Number One Award	Won	
The Official Vodafone Big Top 40 Number One Awards	2024	"Disease"	Number One Award	Won	
The Official Vodafone Big Top 40 Number One Awards	2025	"Abracadabra"	Number One Award	Won	
The Official Vodafone Big Top 40 Number One Awards	2025	"The Dead Dance"	Number One Award	Won	
OGAE Song Contest	2019	"Shallow" (with Bradley Cooper)	Song Contest Award	2nd place	
The One Show Awards	2012	Google Chrome: Lady Gaga	Music	Merit	
The One Show Awards	2017	The Lady Gaga + Intel Experience	Innovation in Branded Entertainment	Merit	
The One Show Awards	2017	Super Bowl Halftime Show: Intel Drones + Lady Gaga	Innovation in Branded Entertainment	Silver	
The One Show Awards	2017	Super Bowl Halftime Show: Intel Drones + Lady Gaga	Experiential / Live Events	Merit	
The One Show Awards	2017	Super Bowl Halftime Show: Intel Drones + Lady Gaga	Broadcast / Short Form - Single	Merit	
The One Show Awards	2026	"Abracadabra": From Fan to Featured	Influencer Marketing / Use of Celebrity	Silver	
The One Show Awards	2026	"Abracadabra": From Fan to Featured	User-Generated Content (UGC)	Merit	
The One Show Awards	2026	"Abracadabra": From Fan to Featured	Popular Culture Impact	Merit	
The One Show Awards	2026	"Abracadabra": From Fan to Featured	Social Media / Social Post - Single or Series	Merit	
The One Show Awards	2026	"Abracadabra": From Fan to Featured	Community Building	Merit	
The One Show Awards	2026	"Abracadabra": From Fan to Featured	Best Use of TikTok	Merit	
Online Film Critics Society	2018	A Star Is Born	Best Actress	Nominated	
Palm Springs International Film Festival	2022	Lady Gaga	Icon Award	Won	
Paris Film Critics Association Awards	2022	House of Gucci	Best Actress	Nominated	
Patron of the Artists Awards	2018	Lady Gaga	Artists Inspiration Award	Won	
People's Choice Awards	2010	Lady Gaga	Favorite Breakout Artist	Won	
People's Choice Awards	2010	Lady Gaga	Favorite Pop Artist	Won	
People's Choice Awards	2011	Lady Gaga	Favorite Female Artist	Nominated	
People's Choice Awards	2011	Lady Gaga	Favorite Pop Artist	Nominated	
People's Choice Awards	2011	"Telephone" (featuring Beyoncé)	Favorite Music Video	Nominated	
People's Choice Awards	2011	"Telephone" (featuring Beyoncé)	Favorite Song	Nominated	
People's Choice Awards	2012	Lady Gaga	Favorite Female Artist	Nominated	
People's Choice Awards	2012	Lady Gaga	Favorite Pop Artist	Nominated	
People's Choice Awards	2012	Born This Way	Favorite Album of the Year	Won	
People's Choice Awards	2012	"The Edge of Glory"	Favorite Song	Nominated	
People's Choice Awards	2012	"Judas"	Favorite Music Video	Nominated	
People's Choice Awards	2014	Little Monsters	Favorite Music Fan Following	Nominated	
People's Choice Awards	2016	American Horror Story: Hotel	Favorite Sci-Fi/Fantasy TV Actress	Nominated	
People's Choice Awards	2017	Lady Gaga	Favorite Social Media Celebrity	Nominated	
People's Choice Awards	2019	Lady Gaga	Style Star of 2019	Nominated	
People's Choice Awards	2019	Enigma	Concert Tour of 2019	Nominated	
People's Choice Awards	2020	Lady Gaga	Female Artist of 2020	Nominated	
People's Choice Awards	2020	Lady Gaga	Social Celebrity of 2020	Nominated	
People's Choice Awards	2020	Lady Gaga	Style Star of 2020	Nominated	
People's Choice Awards	2020	Chromatica	Album of 2020	Nominated	
People's Choice Awards	2020	"Rain on Me" (with Ariana Grande)	Song of 2020	Nominated	
People's Choice Awards	2020	"Rain on Me" (with Ariana Grande)	Collaboration of 2020	Nominated	
People's Choice Awards	2020	"Rain on Me" (with Ariana Grande)	Music Video of 2020	Nominated	
People's Choice Awards	2022	Lady Gaga	Female Artist of 2022	Nominated	
People's Choice Awards	2022	"Hold My Hand"	Song of 2022	Nominated	
People's Choice Awards	2022	The Chromatica Ball	Concert Tour of 2022	Nominated	
Phoenix Film Critics Society	2018	A Star Is Born	Best Actress in a Leading Role	Won	
Phoenix Film Critics Society	2018	"Shallow"	Best Original Song	Won	
Pollstar Awards	2010	Lady Gaga	Best New Touring Artist	Nominated	
Pollstar Awards	2011	The Monster Ball Tour	Major Tour of the Year	Nominated	
Pollstar Awards	2011	The Monster Ball Tour	Most Creative Stage Production	Nominated	
Pollstar Awards	2012	The Monster Ball Tour	Major Tour of the Year	Won	
Pollstar Awards	2012	The Monster Ball Tour	Most Creative Stage Production	Nominated	
Pollstar Awards	2013	Born This Way Ball	Most Creative Stage Production	Nominated	
Pollstar Awards	2018	Joanne World Tour	Pop Tour of the Year	Nominated	
Pollstar Awards	2020	Enigma	Best Residency	Nominated	
Pollstar Awards	2021	Lady Gaga	Pollstar Touring Artist of the Decade	Nominated	
Pollstar Awards	2021	Lady Gaga	Pop Touring Artist of the Decade	Won	
Pollstar Awards	2022	Jazz & Piano	Best Residency	Won	
Pollstar Awards	2023	The Chromatica Ball	Pop Tour of the Year	Nominated	
Pollstar Awards	2024	Jazz & Piano	Residency of the Year	Nominated	
Pollstar Awards	2026	The Mayhem Ball	Major Tour of the Year	Nominated	
Pollstar Awards	2026	The Mayhem Ball	Pop Tour of the Year	Nominated	
Pollstar Awards	2026	Lady Gaga	Fan Favorite Live Performer of the Year	Nominated	
Poppy Awards	2016	American Horror Story: Hotel	Best Actress, Limited Series/Movie	Won	
Premios Oye!	2009	Lady Gaga	English Breakthrough of the Year	Won	
Premios Oye!	2009	The Fame	English Album of the Year	Won	
Premios Oye!	2009	"Poker Face"	English Record of the Year	Won	
Premios Oye!	2010	The Fame Monster	English Album of the Year	Won	
Premios Oye!	2010	"Bad Romance"	English Record of the Year	Nominated	
Premios Oye!	2010	"Alejandro"	English Record of the Year	Nominated	
Premios Oye!	2012	Born This Way	English Album of the Year	Nominated	
PRWeek Global Awards	2026	"Abracadabra": From Fan to Featured	Global PR – Content	Won	
PRWeek Global Awards	2026	"Abracadabra": From Fan to Featured	Global PR – Creative Idea	Honoree	
PRWeek US Awards	2026	"Abracadabra": From Fan to Featured	Best in Social Media	Honoree	
PRWeek US Awards	2026	"Abracadabra": From Fan to Featured	Best Viral	Honoree	
Q Awards	2009	Lady Gaga	Breakthrough Artist	Nominated	
Q Awards	2009	"Just Dance" (featuring Colby O'Donis)	Best Video	Won	
Q Awards	2010	Lady Gaga	Best Female	Nominated	
Q Awards	2010	Lady Gaga	Best Live Act	Nominated	
Q Awards	2011	"Judas"	Best Video	Nominated	
Q Awards	2012	Lady Gaga	Best Act in the World Today	Nominated	
Queerties Awards	2012	Die Antwoord vs. Lady Gaga	Celebrity Beef of the Year	Nominated	
Queerties Awards	2012	Madonna vs. Lady Gaga	Celebrity Beef of the Year	Nominated	
Queerties Awards	2013	"Applause"	Anthem of the Year	Nominated	
Queerties Awards	2017	Lady Gaga	Entertainer	Nominated	
Queerties Awards	2021	Lady Gaga	Badass	Runner-up	
Queerties Awards	2021	"Rain on Me" (with Ariana Grande)	Anthem	Won	
Queerties Awards	2022	Lady Gaga	Badass	Nominated	
Queerties Awards	2022	House of Gucci	Film Performance	Won	
Queerties Awards	2025	Joker: Folie à Deux	Film Performance	Runner-up	
Queerties Awards	2026	"Abracadabra"	Anthem	Won	
The Radio Academy Honours	2010	Lady Gaga	Triple A Media Award	Won	
Radio Disney Music Awards	2017	Lady Gaga	Best Female Artist	Nominated	
The Record of the Year	2009	"Poker Face"	The Record of the Year	Won	
The Record of the Year	2010	"Telephone" (featuring Beyoncé)	The Record of the Year	2nd place	
The Record of the Year	2011	"Born This Way"	The Record of the Year	Won	
RIAA Diamond Awards	2013	"Bad Romance"	Digital Diamond Award	Won	
RIAA Diamond Awards	2015	"Poker Face"	Digital Diamond Award	Won	
RIAA Diamond Awards	2023	"Just Dance" (featuring Colby O'Donis)	Digital Diamond Award	Won	
Rockbjörnen	2010	Lady Gaga	Concert of the Year	Nominated	
Rockbjörnen	2010	"Bad Romance"	Foreign Song of the Year	Nominated	
Rockbjörnen	2010	"Telephone" (featuring Beyoncé)	Foreign Song of the Year	Nominated	
Rockbjörnen	2010	"Alejandro"	Foreign Song of the Year	Nominated	
Rockbjörnen	2011	"Born This Way"	Foreign Song of the Year	Won	
Rockbjörnen	2019	"Shallow" (with Bradley Cooper)	Foreign Song of the Year	Won	
Rockbjörnen	2021	"Rain on Me" (with Ariana Grande)	Foreign Song of the Year	Nominated	
Rockbjörnen	2025	"Abracadabra"	Foreign Song of the Year	Nominated	
Rockbjörnen	2025	"Die with a Smile" (with Bruno Mars)	Foreign Song of the Year	Nominated	
Rockol Awards	2011	Born This Way	Best International Album	3rd place	
Rockol Awards	2011	"Judas"	Best International Video	3rd place	
Rockol Awards	2011	"Judas"	Best International Single	Nominated	
Rockol Awards	2011	"Born This Way"	Best International Single	Nominated	
Rockol Awards	2011	Lady Gaga	Best Concert	Nominated	
Rockol Awards	2012	Lady Gaga	Best Concert	Nominated	
Rockol Awards	2013	Artpop	Best International Album	Runner-up	
Rockol Awards	2013	"Applause"	Best International Video	Nominated	
Rockol Awards	2013	"Applause"	Best International Single	Nominated	
Rockol Awards	2018	A Star Is Born (with Bradley Cooper)	Best International Album (Critics)	Won	
Rockol Awards	2018	A Star Is Born (with Bradley Cooper)	Best International Album (Public)	Won	
RTHK International Pop Poll Awards	2009	Lady Gaga	Top New Act	Silver	
RTHK International Pop Poll Awards	2010	"Poker Face"	Super Gold Song	Won	
RTHK International Pop Poll Awards	2010	"Poker Face"	Top Ten International Gold Songs	Won	
RTHK International Pop Poll Awards	2010	"Bad Romance"	Top Ten International Gold Songs	Won	
RTHK International Pop Poll Awards	2010	Lady Gaga	Top Female Artist	Gold	
RTHK International Pop Poll Awards	2011	"Telephone" (featuring Beyoncé)	Top Ten International Gold Songs	Won	
RTHK International Pop Poll Awards	2011	"Telephone" (featuring Beyoncé)	Super Gold Song	Won	
RTHK International Pop Poll Awards	2011	The Fame Monster	The Best Selling English Album	Won	
RTHK International Pop Poll Awards	2011	Lady Gaga	Top Female Artist	Gold	
RTHK International Pop Poll Awards	2012	"Born This Way"	Top Ten International Gold Songs	Won	
RTHK International Pop Poll Awards	2012	"Born This Way"	Super Gold Song	Won	
RTHK International Pop Poll Awards	2012	Lady Gaga	Top Female Artist	Gold	
RTHK International Pop Poll Awards	2014	"Applause"	Top Ten International Gold Songs	Won	
RTHK International Pop Poll Awards	2014	Lady Gaga	Top Female Artist	Silver	
RTHK International Pop Poll Awards	2015	Lady Gaga	Top Female Artist	Silver	
RTHK International Pop Poll Awards	2017	"Million Reasons"	Top Ten International Gold Songs	Won	
RTHK International Pop Poll Awards	2017	Lady Gaga	Top Female Artist	Gold	
RTHK International Pop Poll Awards	2019	"Shallow" (with Bradley Cooper)	Top Ten International Gold Songs	Won	
RTHK International Pop Poll Awards	2019	"Shallow" (with Bradley Cooper)	Super Gold Song	Won	
RTHK International Pop Poll Awards	2019	Lady Gaga	Top Female Artist	Gold	
RTHK International Pop Poll Awards	2019	A Star Is Born (with Bradley Cooper)	The Best Selling Soundtrack Album	Won	
RTHK International Pop Poll Awards	2021	"Rain on Me" (with Ariana Grande)	Top Ten International Gold Songs	Won	
RTHK International Pop Poll Awards	2021	Chromatica	The Best Selling English Album	Won	
RTHK International Pop Poll Awards	2022	"Hold My Hand"	Top Ten International Gold Songs	Nominated	
RTHK International Pop Poll Awards	2022	Lady Gaga	Top Female Artist	Nominated	
RTHK International Pop Poll Awards	2022	Top Gun: Maverick (with Lorne Balfe, Harold Faltermeyer and Hans Zimmer)	Top Soundtrack Album	Won	
RTHK International Pop Poll Awards	2024	"Die with a Smile" (with Bruno Mars)	Top Ten International Gold Songs	Won	
RTHK International Pop Poll Awards	2024	Lady Gaga	Top Female Singers	Nominated	
RTHK International Pop Poll Awards	2025	"Abracadabra"	Top Ten International Gold Songs	Won	
RTHK International Pop Poll Awards	2025	"The Dead Dance"	Top Ten International Gold Songs	Nominated	
RTHK International Pop Poll Awards	2025	Lady Gaga	Top Female Singers	Gold	
RTHK International Pop Poll Awards	2025	Mayhem	Top English Album	Won	
San Diego Film Critics Society	2018	A Star Is Born	Best Actress	Nominated	
San Francisco Bay Area Film Critics Circle	2018	A Star Is Born	Best Actress	Nominated	
Satellite Awards	2011	"Hello Hello"	Best Original Song	Nominated	
Satellite Awards	2016	"Til It Happens to You"	Best Original Song	Won	
Satellite Awards	2016	American Horror Story: Hotel	Best Actress – Television Series Drama	Nominated	
Satellite Awards	2019	A Star Is Born	Best Actress – Motion Picture Musical or Comedy	Nominated	
Satellite Awards	2019	"Shallow"	Best Original Song	Won	
Satellite Awards	2022	House of Gucci	Best Actress – Motion Picture Drama	Nominated	
Satellite Awards	2023	Top Gun: Maverick (with Lorne Balfe, Harold Faltermeyer and Hans Zimmer)	Best Original Score	Nominated	
Satellite Awards	2023	"Hold My Hand"	Best Original Song	Won	
Seattle Film Critics Society	2018	A Star Is Born	Best Actress	Nominated	
Seattle Film Critics Society	2022	House of Gucci	Best Actress	Nominated	
Servicemembers Legal Defense Network	2011	Lady Gaga	Randy Shilts Visibility Award	Won	
Shorty Awards	2014	Lady Gaga	Green – Global Issues	Nominated	
Shorty Awards	2014	Lady Gaga	Art – Arts & Design	Nominated	
Shorty Awards	2017	Lady Gaga	Celebrity – Entertainment	Nominated	
Shorty Awards	2019	Lady Gaga	Innovator of the Year – Tech & Innovation	Won	
Shorty Awards	2020	Lady Gaga Eye Roll	GIF of the Year – Content	Nominated	
Shorty Awards	2025	"Abracadabra": From Fan to Featured	Multi-Platform Campaign – Campaign	Honoree	
Shorty Awards	2025	"Abracadabra": From Fan to Featured	Audio & Music – Content & Design	Won	
Shorty Awards	2025	"Abracadabra": From Fan to Featured	Arts & Culture – Cause	Honoree	
Shorty Awards	2025	"Abracadabra": From Fan to Featured	Influencer, Creator & Celebrity – Partnerships	Honoree	
Shorty Awards	2025	"Abracadabra": From Fan to Featured	Community Engagement – Strategy & Engagement	Honoree	
Silver Clef Award	2013	Lady Gaga	Best Live Act	Nominated	
Society of Composers & Lyricists	2023	"Hold My Hand"	Outstanding Original Song for a Dramatic or Documentary Visual Media Production	Nominated	
Songwriters Hall of Fame	2015	Lady Gaga	Contemporary Icon Award	Won	
Songwriters Hall of Fame	2027	Lady Gaga	Hall of Fame Inductee	Pending	
Southeastern Film Critics Association	2018	A Star Is Born	Best Actress	Runner-up	
Space Shower Music Video Awards	2010	"Paparazzi"	Best International Video	Won	
Space Shower Music Video Awards	2011	"Telephone" (featuring Beyoncé)	Best International Video	Nominated	
Spotify Awards	2020	"Born This Way"	Most-Added to LGBTQ+ Playlists Artist	Nominated	
St. Louis Film Critics Association	2015	"Til It Happens to You"	Best Song	Nominated	
St. Louis Film Critics Association	2018	A Star Is Born	Best Actress	Runner-up	
St. Louis Film Critics Association	2018	A Star Is Born (with Bradley Cooper)	Best Soundtrack	Nominated	
St. Louis Film Critics Association	2021	House of Gucci	Best Actress	Nominated	
St. Louis Film Critics Association	2022	Top Gun: Maverick (with Lorne Balfe, Harold Faltermeyer and Hans Zimmer)	Best Soundtrack	Nominated	
Stonewall Awards	2011	Lady Gaga	Hero of the Year	Nominated	
Swiss Music Awards	2010	"Poker Face"	Best International Song	Won	
Swiss Music Awards	2010	Lady Gaga	Best International Newcomer	Nominated	
Swiss Music Awards	2020	"Shallow" (with Bradley Cooper)	Best International Hit	Won	
TEC Awards	2012	Born This Way Ball	Tour Sound Production	Nominated	
TEC Awards	2015	"Anything Goes" (with Tony Bennett)	Record Production – Single or Track	Nominated	
TEC Awards	2018	Super Bowl LI Halftime Show Starring Lady Gaga	Remote Production – Recording or Broadcast	Nominated	
TEC Awards	2020	A Star Is Born (with Bradley Cooper)	Record Production – Album	Won	
TEC Awards	2020	"Always Remember Us This Way"	Record Production – Single or Track	Nominated	
Teen Choice Awards	2009	Lady Gaga	Choice Music: Female Artist	Nominated	
Teen Choice Awards	2009	Lady Gaga	Choice Music: Breakout Artist	Nominated	
Teen Choice Awards	2009	Lady Gaga	Choice Celebrity Dancer	Nominated	
Teen Choice Awards	2009	The Fame	Choice Music: Female Album	Nominated	
Teen Choice Awards	2009	"Just Dance" (featuring Colby O'Donis)	Choice Music: Hook Up	Won	
Teen Choice Awards	2009	"Poker Face"	Choice Music: Single	Nominated	
Teen Choice Awards	2010	Lady Gaga	Choice Music: Female Artist	Won	
Teen Choice Awards	2010	Lady Gaga	Choice Female Red Carpet Fashion Icon	Nominated	
Teen Choice Awards	2010	Lady Gaga	Choice Summer Music Star: Female	Won	
Teen Choice Awards	2010	The Fame Monster	Choice Music: Pop Album	Nominated	
Teen Choice Awards	2010	"Bad Romance"	Choice Music: Single	Nominated	
Teen Choice Awards	2010	"Telephone" (featuring Beyoncé)	Choice Music: Hook Up	Nominated	
Teen Choice Awards	2010	"Alejandro"	Choice Summer: Song	Nominated	
Teen Choice Awards	2011	Lady Gaga	Choice Music: Female Artist	Nominated	
Teen Choice Awards	2011	Lady Gaga	Choice Female Red Carpet Fashion Icon	Nominated	
Teen Choice Awards	2011	"Born This Way"	Choice Music: Single	Nominated	
Teen Choice Awards	2013	Lady Gaga	Choice Twitter Personality	Nominated	
Teen Choice Awards	2014	Lady Gaga	Choice Social Media Queen	Nominated	
Teen Choice Awards	2015	Lady Gaga	Choice Twit	Nominated	
Teen Choice Awards	2015	Little Monsters	Choice Fandom	Nominated	
Teen Choice Awards	2016	Lady Gaga	Choice Social Media Queen	Nominated	
Teen Choice Awards	2016	Lady Gaga	Choice Twit	Nominated	
Teen Choice Awards	2016	Lady Gaga	Choice Selfie Taker	Nominated	
Teen Choice Awards	2019	A Star Is Born	Choice Drama Movie Actress	Nominated	
Teen Choice Awards	2019	"Shallow" (with Bradley Cooper)	Choice Collaboration	Nominated	
Teen Choice Awards	2019	"Shallow" (with Bradley Cooper)	Choice Song from a Movie	Nominated	
Teen Choice Awards	2019	Lady Gaga and Bradley Cooper	Choice Ship	Nominated	
Telehit Awards	2009	"Poker Face"	Song of the Year	Won	
Telehit Awards	2010	"Telephone" (featuring Beyoncé)	Video of the Year	Won	
Telehit Awards	2010	The Fame Monster	International Album of the Year	Won	
Telehit Awards	2011	Lady Gaga	Artist of the Year	Won	
Telehit Awards	2011	"Born This Way"	Video of the Year	Won	
Ticketmaster Awards	2018	Joanne World Tour	Touring Milestone Award	Won	
Ticketmaster Awards (France)	2023	Lady Gaga	International Concert of the Year	Nominated	
Ticketmaster Awards (France)	2026	Lady Gaga	International Concert of the Year	Won	
Ticketmaster Awards (Germany)	2023	Lady Gaga	Live Act of the Year	Nominated	
Ticketmaster Awards (Germany)	2026	Lady Gaga	International Live Act of the Year	Nominated	
Ticketmaster Awards (Italy)	2026	Lady Gaga	Best International Artist	Nominated	
Ticketmaster Awards (Italy)	2026	Lady Gaga	Best Fanbase	Nominated	
Ticketmaster Awards (Italy)	2026	The Mayhem Ball	Best Production Design	Nominated	
Ticketmaster Awards (Netherlands)	2026	Lady Gaga	Best Fanbase	Nominated	
Ticketmaster Awards (Spain)	2026	Lady Gaga	Best International Live Performance	Nominated	
Ticketmaster Awards (Spain)	2026	The Mayhem Ball	Best Tour of the Year	Nominated	
Ticketmaster Awards (UK)	2023	Lady Gaga	International Live Act of the Year	Nominated	
TMF Awards	2009	Lady Gaga	Best New Artist – International	Won	
TMF Awards	2009	Lady Gaga	Best Female Artist – International	Won	
TMF Awards	2009	Lady Gaga	Best Pop – International	Won	
The Trevor Project	2011	Lady Gaga	Trevor Hero Award	Won	
UK Music Video Awards	2009	"Paparazzi"	Best International Video	Won	
UK Music Video Awards	2010	"Bad Romance"	Best International Video	Won	
UK Music Video Awards	2010	"Telephone" (featuring Beyoncé)	Best International Video	Nominated	
Urban Music Awards	2009	"Poker Face"	Best Music Video	Nominated	
Vevo Certified Awards	2014	"Just Dance" (featuring Colby O'Donis)	Certified Award	Won	
Vevo Certified Awards	2014	"Poker Face"	Certified Award	Won	
Vevo Certified Awards	2014	"LoveGame"	Certified Award	Won	
Vevo Certified Awards	2014	"Paparazzi"	Certified Award	Won	
Vevo Certified Awards	2014	"Bad Romance"	Certified Award	Won	
Vevo Certified Awards	2014	"Telephone" (featuring Beyoncé)	Certified Award	Won	
Vevo Certified Awards	2014	"Alejandro"	Certified Award	Won	
Vevo Certified Awards	2014	"Born This Way"	Certified Award	Won	
Vevo Certified Awards	2014	"Judas"	Certified Award	Won	
Vevo Certified Awards	2014	"Applause"	Certified Award	Won	
Virgin Media Music Awards	2009	Lady Gaga	Best Solo Female	Nominated	
Virgin Media Music Awards	2009	Lady Gaga	Hottest Female	Nominated	
Virgin Media Music Awards	2009	Lady Gaga	Shameless Publicity Seeker	Won	
Virgin Media Music Awards	2009	Lady Gaga	Best Newcomer	Nominated	
Virgin Media Music Awards	2009	Lady Gaga	Twit of the Year	Nominated	
Virgin Media Music Awards	2009	The Fame	Best Album	Won	
Virgin Media Music Awards	2009	"Just Dance" (featuring Colby O'Donis)	Best Track	Nominated	
Virgin Media Music Awards	2010	"Telephone" (featuring Beyoncé)	Best Collaboration	Won	
Virgin Media Music Awards	2010	"Telephone" (featuring Beyoncé)	Best Single	Nominated	
Virgin Media Music Awards	2010	"Telephone" (featuring Beyoncé)	Best Video	Nominated	
Virgin Media Music Awards	2010	Lady Gaga	Best Solo Female	Nominated	
Virgin Media Music Awards	2010	Lady Gaga	Hottest Female	Nominated	
Virgin Media Music Awards	2010	Lady Gaga	Shameless Publicity Seeker	Nominated	
Virgin Media Music Awards	2010	Lady Gaga	Best Live Act	Nominated	
Virgin Media Music Awards	2010	Lady Gaga	Legend of the Year	Nominated	
Virgin Media Music Awards	2011	Born This Way	Best Album	Won	
Virgin Media Music Awards	2011	"Born This Way"	Best Video	Won	
Virgin Media Music Awards	2011	"Born This Way"	Best Track	Won	
Virgin Media Music Awards	2011	Lady Gaga	Best Female	Won	
Virgin Media Music Awards	2011	Lady Gaga	Hottest Female	Won	
Washington D.C. Area Film Critics Association	2018	A Star Is Born	Best Actress	Won	
Washington D.C. Area Film Critics Association	2021	House of Gucci	Best Actress	Nominated	
Webby Awards	2013	Gaga's Workshop	Celebrity/Fan	Won	
Webby Awards	2015	Lady Gaga Live at the Doritos #BoldStage	Events & Live Streams (Branded) in Video	Honoree	
Webby Awards	2016	Lady Gaga Side-eye	GIF of the Year	Nominated	
Webby Awards	2017	The Lady Gaga + Intel Performance	Live Experiences (Branded) in Film & Video	Won	
Webby Awards	2017	The Lady Gaga + Intel Performance	People's Voice Award for Integrated Campaign (Film & Video)	Won	
Webby Awards	2017	The Lady Gaga + Intel Performance	People's Voice Award for Branded Content (Advertising, Media & PR)	Won	
Webby Awards	2017	Bud Light × Lady Gaga Dive Bar Tour	Best Use of Social Media (Advertising, Media & PR)	Nominated	
Webby Awards	2017	Bud Light × Lady Gaga Dive Bar Tour	Experience Marketing (Advertising, Media & PR)	Honoree	
Webby Awards	2018	Gaga: Five Foot Two	People's Voice Award for Music (Film and Video)	Won	
Webby Awards	2018	Gaga: Five Foot Two	People's Voice Award for Best Editing (Film and Video)	Won	
Webby Awards	2018	Intel × Super Bowl Halftime Show	Best Event Activation (Advertising, Marketing & PR)	Won	
Webby Awards	2018	Intel × Super Bowl Halftime Show	People's Voice Award for Best Event Activation (Advertising, Marketing & PR)	Won	
Webby Awards	2019	Lady Gaga Explains Why Donatella Versace Is an Icon	People's Voice Award for Fashion & Beauty (Video)	Won	
Webby Awards	2019	"Shallow" (with Bradley Cooper)	Music Video (Video)	Nominated	
Webby Awards	2021	One World: Together at Home	Public Service & Activism (AI, Metaverse & Virtual)	Nominated	
Webby Awards	2021	One World: Together at Home	Events & Live Streams (Video)	Nominated	
Webby Awards	2021	One World: Together at Home	Variety & Reality (Video)	Nominated	
Webby Awards	2023	Haus Labs by Lady Gaga	Best Visual Design – Function (Websites and Mobile Sites)	Honoree	
Webby Awards	2025	"Abracadabra"	Music Video (Video & Film)	Nominated	
Webby Awards	2025	Lady Gaga – A Digital Home for a Global Pop Icon	Websites & Mobile Sites (Entertainment)	Won	
Webby Awards	2025	Lady Gaga – A Digital Home for a Global Pop Icon	People's Voice Award for Websites & Mobile Sites (Entertainment)	Won	
Webby Awards	2025	Lady Gaga – A Digital Home for a Global Pop Icon	People's Voice Award for Websites & Mobile Sites (Music)	Won	
Webby Awards	2026	Lady Gaga – A Digital Home for a Global Pop Icon	People's Voice Award for Websites & Mobile Sites (Music)	Won	
Webby Awards	2026	Lady Gaga – A Digital Home for a Global Pop Icon	Websites & Mobile Sites (Music)	Won	
Webby Awards	2026	Lady Gaga – A Digital Home for a Global Pop Icon	People's Voice Award for Websites & Mobile Sites (Best Mobile Visual Design – Aesthetic)	Won	
Webby Awards	2026	Lady Gaga – A Digital Home for a Global Pop Icon	People's Voice Award for Websites & Mobile Sites (Best Responsive/Adaptive Design for Mobile)	Won	
Webby Awards	2026	Lady Gaga Monster Press Conference	Social (Events & Livestreams)	Won	
Webby Awards	2026	Lady Gaga Monster Press Conference	People's Voice Award for Social (Events & Livestreams)	Won	
WindowsWear Awards	2022	Dom Pérignon x Lady Gaga	Icon	Won	
Women Film Critics Circle	2018	A Star Is Born (with Bradley Cooper)	Best Screen Couple	Nominated	
World Music Awards	2010	Lady Gaga	World's Best Pop/Rock Artist	Won	
World Music Awards	2010	Lady Gaga	World's Best New Artist	Won	
World Music Awards	2010	Lady Gaga	Best Selling Artist of America	Won	
World Music Awards	2010	The Fame	World's Best Album of the Year	Won	
World Music Awards	2010	"Poker Face"	World's Best Song of the Year	Won	
World Music Awards	2012	Lady Gaga	World's Best Female Artist	Nominated	
World Music Awards	2014	Lady Gaga	World’s Best Female Artist	Nominated	
World Music Awards	2014	Lady Gaga	World’s Best Live Act	Nominated	
World Music Awards	2014	Lady Gaga	World’s Best Entertainer of the Year	Nominated	
World Music Awards	2014	Artpop	World’s Best Album	Nominated	
World Music Awards	2014	Born This Way	World’s Best Album	Nominated	
World Music Awards	2014	"Applause"	World’s Best Song	Nominated	
World Music Awards	2014	"Applause"	World’s Best Video	Nominated	
World Music Awards	2014	"Do What U Want" (featuring R. Kelly)	World’s Best Song	Nominated	
World Music Awards	2014	"Do What U Want" (featuring R. Kelly)	World’s Best Video	Nominated	
World Music Awards	2014	"G.U.Y."	World’s Best Song	Nominated	
World Music Awards	2014	"G.U.Y."	World’s Best Video	Nominated	
World Music Awards	2014	"Marry the Night"	World’s Best Song	Nominated	
World Music Awards	2014	"Marry the Night"	World’s Best Video	Nominated	
World Music Awards	2014	"The Lady Is a Tramp"	World’s Best Song	Nominated	
World Music Awards	2014	"The Lady Is a Tramp"	World’s Best Video	Nominated	
World Soundtrack Awards	2019	"Shallow"	Best Original Song Written Directly for a Film	Won	
World Soundtrack Awards	2022	"Hold My Hand"	Best Original Song Written Directly for a Film	Nominated	
WOWIE Awards	2018	A Star Is Born "Hey" Meme	Best Meme/Gif	Nominated	
WOWIE Awards	2018	Lady Gaga for A Star Is Born	Best Red Carpet Looks	Nominated	
WOWIE Awards	2019	Haus Labs	Best Beauty Line	Nominated	
WOWIE Awards	2020	Chromatica	Outstanding Album or EP	Won	
WOWIE Awards	2020	"Sour Candy" (with Blackpink)	Outstanding Collaboration Song	Won	
WOWIE Awards	2020	Lady Gaga & Ariana Grande at the 2020 MTV Video Music Awards	Outstanding Musical Performance	Nominated	
YouTube Music Awards	2013	"Applause"	Video of the Year	Nominated	
YouTube Music Awards	2015	Lady Gaga	50 Artists to Watch	Won	
ZD Awards	2010	Lady Gaga	Best Foreign Artist	Nominated	
ZD Awards	2012	Lady Gaga	Best Foreign Tour	Nominated	
ZD Awards	2013	Lady Gaga	Best Foreign Artist	Nominated	
Žebřík Music Awards	2008	Lady Gaga	Best International Discovery	9th place	
Žebřík Music Awards	2009	The Fame Monster	Best International Album	5th place	
Žebřík Music Awards	2009	"Paparazzi"	Best International Music Video	Runner-up	
Žebřík Music Awards	2009	"Poker Face"	Best International Music Video	7th place	
Žebřík Music Awards	2009	Lady Gaga	Best International Female Singer	Runner-up	
Žebřík Music Awards	2009	Lady Gaga	Best International Discovery	Won	
Žebřík Music Awards	2009	Lady Gaga	Best International Trouble	7th place	
Žebřík Music Awards	2010	"Telephone" (featuring Beyoncé)	Best International Music Video	Runner-up	
Žebřík Music Awards	2010	Lady Gaga	Best International Female Singer	Runner-up	
Žebřík Music Awards	2010	Lady Gaga	Best International Trouble	Runner-up	
Žebřík Music Awards	2011	"Marry the Night"	Best International Music Video	4th place	
Žebřík Music Awards	2011	The Monster Ball Tour	Best International Live	3rd place	
Žebřík Music Awards	2011	Lady Gaga	Best International Trouble	3rd place	
Žebřík Music Awards	2016	Joanne	Best International Album	4th place	
Žebřík Music Awards	2016	"Perfect Illusion"	Best International Composition	5th place	
Žebřík Music Awards	2016	Lady Gaga	Best International Female Singer	4th place	
Žebřík Music Awards	2018	A Star Is Born (with Bradley Cooper)	Best International Album	Won	
Žebřík Music Awards	2018	"Shallow" (with Bradley Cooper)	Best International Composition	Won	
Žebřík Music Awards	2018	"Shallow" (with Bradley Cooper)	Best International Music Video	Runner-up	
Žebřík Music Awards	2018	Lady Gaga	Best International Female Singer	Won	
Žebřík Music Awards	2020	Lady Gaga	Best International Female Singer	Runner-up	
Žebřík Music Awards	2021	Lady Gaga	Best International Female Singer	3rd place	
Žebřík Music Awards	2022	"Hold My Hand"	Best International Composition	Nominated	
Žebřík Music Awards	2022	"Hold My Hand"	Best International Music Video	Nominated	
Žebřík Music Awards	2022	Lady Gaga	Best International Female Singer	3rd place	
Žebřík Music Awards	2025	Mayhem	Best International Album	Pending	
Žebřík Music Awards	2025	"The Dead Dance"	Best International Music Video	Pending	
Žebřík Music Awards	2025	Lady Gaga	Best International Female Singer	Pending	

== Other accolades ==
=== Listicles ===
Name of publisher, name of listicle, year(s) listed, and placement result
Publisher	Listicle	Year(s)	Result	Ref.
Apple Music	100 Best Albums	2024	89th (The Fame Monster)	
Billboard	Artist of the Year	2010	Placed	
Billboard	Artists of the Decade	2009	73rd	
Billboard	Artists of the Decade	2021	11th	
Billboard	The Greatest Pop Stars by Year	2009	1st	
Billboard	The Greatest Pop Stars by Year	2010	Honorable Mention	
Billboard	The Greatest Pop Stars by Year	2011	Honorable Mention	
Billboard	The Greatest Pop Stars by Year	2025	3rd	
Billboard	The Greatest Pop Stars of the 21st Century	2024	5th	
Forbes	The 10 Top-Earning Musicians of the 2010s	2019	10th	
Forbes	30 Under 30 in Music	2011 – 2013	Placed	
Forbes	Celebrity 100	2010	4th	
Forbes	Celebrity 100	2011	1st	
Forbes	Celebrity 100	2012	5th	
Forbes	Celebrity 100	2013	2nd	
Forbes	Celebrity 100	2014	15th	
Forbes	Celebrity 100	2015	25th	
Forbes	Celebrity 100	2018	49th	
Forbes	Celebrity 100	2019	90th	
Forbes	Celebrity 100	2020	87th	
Forbes	Highest-Paid Female Musicians	2011	1st	
Forbes	The World's 100 Most Powerful Women	2010	7th	
Forbes	The World's 100 Most Powerful Women	2011	11th	
Forbes	The World's 100 Most Powerful Women	2012	14th	
Forbes	The World's 100 Most Powerful Women	2013	45th	
Forbes	The World's 100 Most Powerful Women	2014	67th	
The Hollywood Reporter	100 Most Powerful Women in Entertainment	2021	Placed	
Rolling Stone	500 Greatest Albums of All Time	2020	484th (Born This Way)	
Rolling Stone	500 Greatest Songs of All Time	2021	482nd ("Bad Romance")	
Time	Time 100 (under "Artists" with tribute written by Cyndi Lauper)	2010	Placed	
Time	Time 100 (under "Icons" with tribute written by Celine Dion)	2019	Placed	
Time	Time Person of the Year (under "People Who Mattered")	2010	Placed	

=== State honors ===
Name of country, year given, and name of honor
Country	Year	Honor	Ref.
Australia	2011	Honorary citizenship of Sydney	
Taiwan	2011	Key to the city of Taichung	
Argentina	2012	Guest of honor of Buenos Aires	
United States	2021	Key to the city of West Hollywood	
