= Billboard Music Award for Top Dance/Electronic Artist =

Annual American music award

This article lists the winners and nominees for the Billboard Music Award for Top Dance/Electronic Artist. From 2011 to 2013, the award was titled Top Dance Artist. In 2013, an additional award called Top EDM Artist was also given.

== Winners and nominees ==
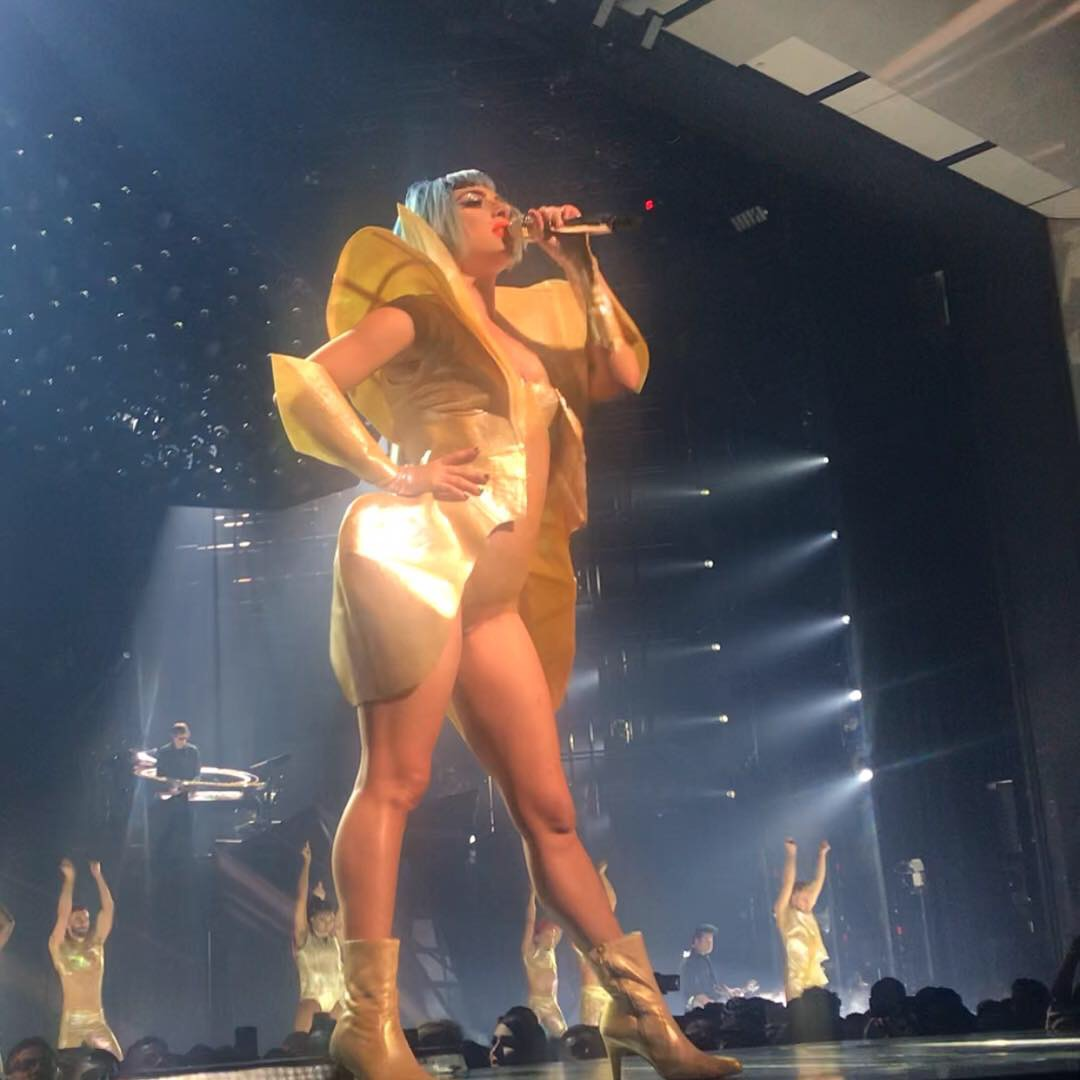
Four-time winning American artist Lady Gaga

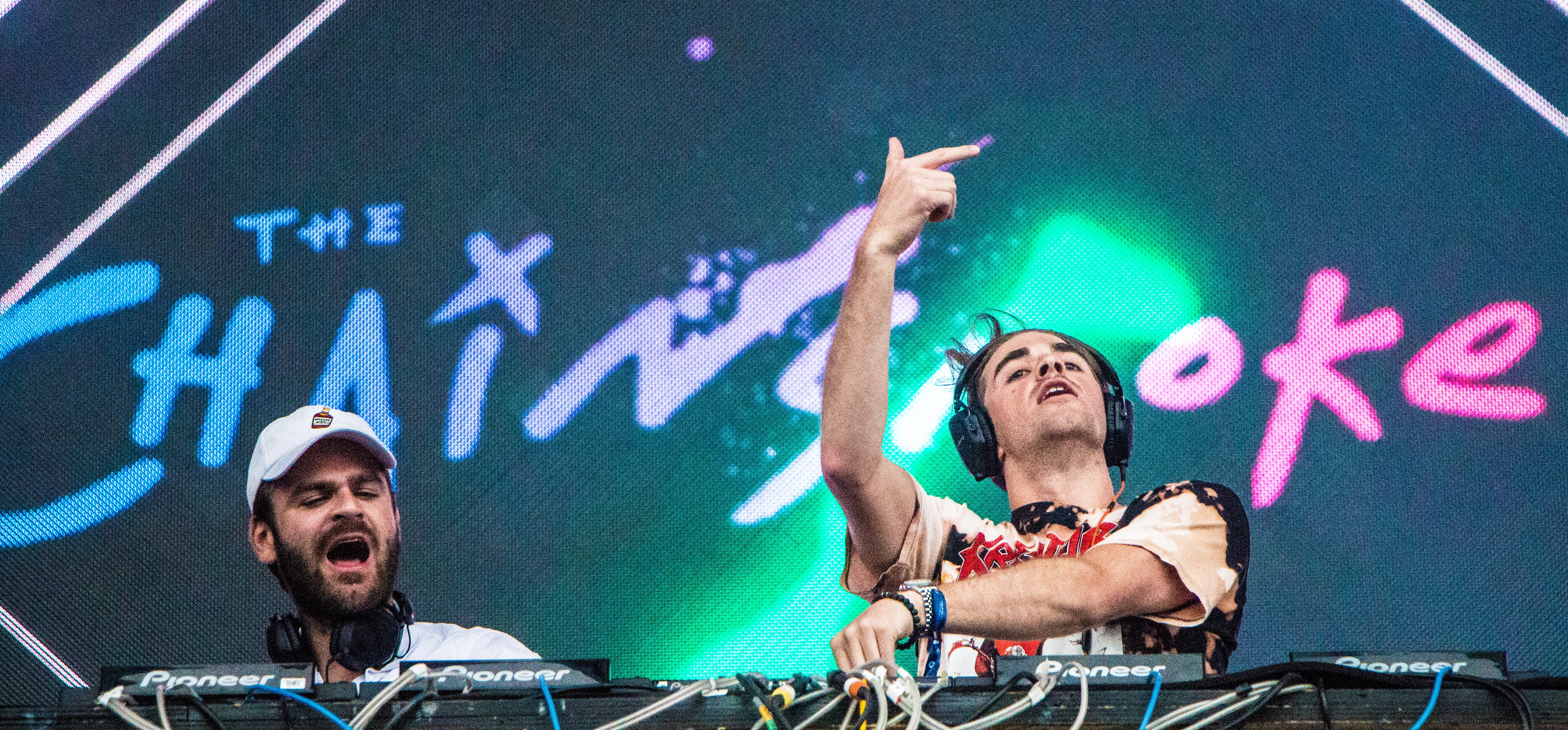
Four-time winning American electronic dance music duo The Chainsmokers

Winners are listed first and highlighted in bold.

=== 2000s ===
Year	Artist	Ref.
2011	**Lady Gaga**	
2011	The Black Eyed Peas	
2011	David Guetta	
2011	La Roux	
2011	Rihanna	
2012	**Lady Gaga**	
2012	Britney Spears	
2012	David Guetta	
2012	LMFAO	
2012	Rihanna	
2013	**Madonna** (Top Dance Artist)	
2013	Calvin Harris	
2013	David Guetta	
2013	Skrillex	
2013	Swedish House Mafia	
2013	**David Guetta** (Top EDM Artist)	
2013	Calvin Harris	
2013	Deadmau5	
2013	Skrillex	
2013	Swedish House Mafia	
2014	**Daft Punk**	
2014	Avicii	
2014	Calvin Harris	
2014	Lady Gaga	
2014	Zedd	
2015	**Calvin Harris**	
2015	Avicii	
2015	Clean Bandit	
2015	Disclosure	
2015	Lindsey Stirling	
2016	**David Guetta**	
2016	The Chainsmokers	
2016	DJ Snake	
2016	Major Lazer	
2016	Zedd	
2017	**The Chainsmokers**	
2017	Calvin Harris	
2017	DJ Snake	
2017	Lindsey Stirling	
2017	Major Lazer	
2018	**The Chainsmokers**	
2018	Calvin Harris	
2018	Kygo	
2018	Marshmello	
2018	Odesza	
2019	**The Chainsmokers**	
2019	Calvin Harris	
2019	Kygo	
2019	Marshmello	
2019	Odesza	

=== 2020s ===
Year	Artist	Ref.
2020	**The Chainsmokers**	
2020	Avicii	
2020	DJ Snake	
2020	Illenium	
2020	Marshmello	
2021	**Lady Gaga**	
2021	The Chainsmokers	
2021	Kygo	
2021	Marshmello	
2021	Surf Mesa	
2022	**Lady Gaga**	
2022	Calvin Harris	
2022	David Guetta	
2022	Marshmello	
2022	Tiësto	
2023	**Beyoncé**	
2023	Drake	
2023	David Guetta	
2023	Calvin Harris	
2023	Tiësto	
2024	**Charli XCX**	
2024	Beyoncé	
2024	The Chainsmokers	
2024	Dua Lipa	
2024	Calvin Harris	

== Multiple wins and nominations ==
4 wins

- Lady Gaga
- The Chainsmokers

2 wins

- David Guetta

8 nominations

- Calvin Harris

6 nominations

- The Chainsmokers
- David Guetta

5 nominations

- Lady Gaga
- Marshmello

3 nominations

- Avicii
- DJ Snake
- Kygo

2 nominations

- Lindsey Stirling
- Major Lazer
- Odesza
- Rihanna
- Skrillex
- Swedish House Mafia
- Zedd
