= The Cure (Lady Gaga song) =

2017 single by Lady Gaga

Single by Lady Gaga
- Released: April 16, 2017
- Recorded: 2017
- Studio: Dragonfly Creek Recording Studios (Malibu, CA)
- Genre: Synth-pop; pop-soul
- Length: 3:31
- Label: Streamline; Interscope
- Songwriters: Lady Gaga; Lukas Nelson; Nick Monson; Mark Nilan; Paul Blair
- Producers: Detroit City; Lady Gaga; Monson

Lady Gaga singles chronology
"Million Reasons" (2016)	"The Cure" (2017)	"Joanne" (2017)

Lyric video
- "The Cure" on YouTube

"The Cure" is a song recorded by American singer and songwriter Lady Gaga. She co-wrote the song with Lukas Nelson, Nick Monson, Mark Nilan, and DJ White Shadow; Detroit City, Gaga, and Monson produced the song. The song originated from a positive vibe between the collaborators, created as a response to atrocities happening around the world. It was developed in Los Angeles, California, where Gaga and her team were working on some music before the singer started filming the 2018 remake of A Star Is Born. Consisting of finger snaps and an electronic pop beat, "The Cure" is composed around an R&B sound. Lyrically, the song talks about the healing effects of love, with the singer advocating herself as the one administering 'the cure'.

The song was released as a standalone single by Interscope Records on April 16, 2017, after Gaga performed it live at the Coachella Valley Music and Arts Festival, where she was a main headliner. Gaga later included it on the setlist of the Joanne World Tour (2017–2018). Critics analyzed the sudden release of the track, finding it to be a departure from the singer's previous releases, and wrote about the anthemic nature of the composition. Commercially, "The Cure" reached the top 10 of the record charts in Australia, Hungary, Lebanon, Scotland, Slovakia and Venezuela, and the digital charts of Finland, Greece, and combined-Europe, as well as the top 20 in the Czech Republic, the United Kingdom, Latvia, and Malaysia.

== Writing and development ==
"The Cure" was written after Lady Gaga's performance at the Super Bowl LI halftime show. Gaga worked with longtime collaborator DJ White Shadow (aka Paul Blair) for the track. He recalled sitting with Gaga and feeling a positive vibe, which led them to write the track described by Blair as "upbeat and cool". Their camaraderie originated due to the "terrible stuff going on in the world right now, it's like when you're a creative person you do your best to try and combat evil with creative stuff, so that was kind of the vibe." Gaga and her team wanted to release the "one-off" single as soon as production was completed.

The song was developed in Los Angeles, where Gaga and her team were working on some other music before the singer became busy with her acting endeavor for A Star Is Born. Gaga utilized the free time from her schedule and asked Blair to meet up and see if they could come up with any new music. "The Cure" was released due to the positive nature and message in the track, although Gaga had already released Joanne, her fifth studio album, six months prior. According to Jocelyn Vena from Bravo, "The Cure" reminded her of the singer's dance-pop songs. Blair explained that the release happened after agreement between all the personnel involved: "Joanne's a great record... we weren't sitting there like, 'Oh, we need to make a song for the summertime and put it out this weekend'."

== Music and lyrics ==
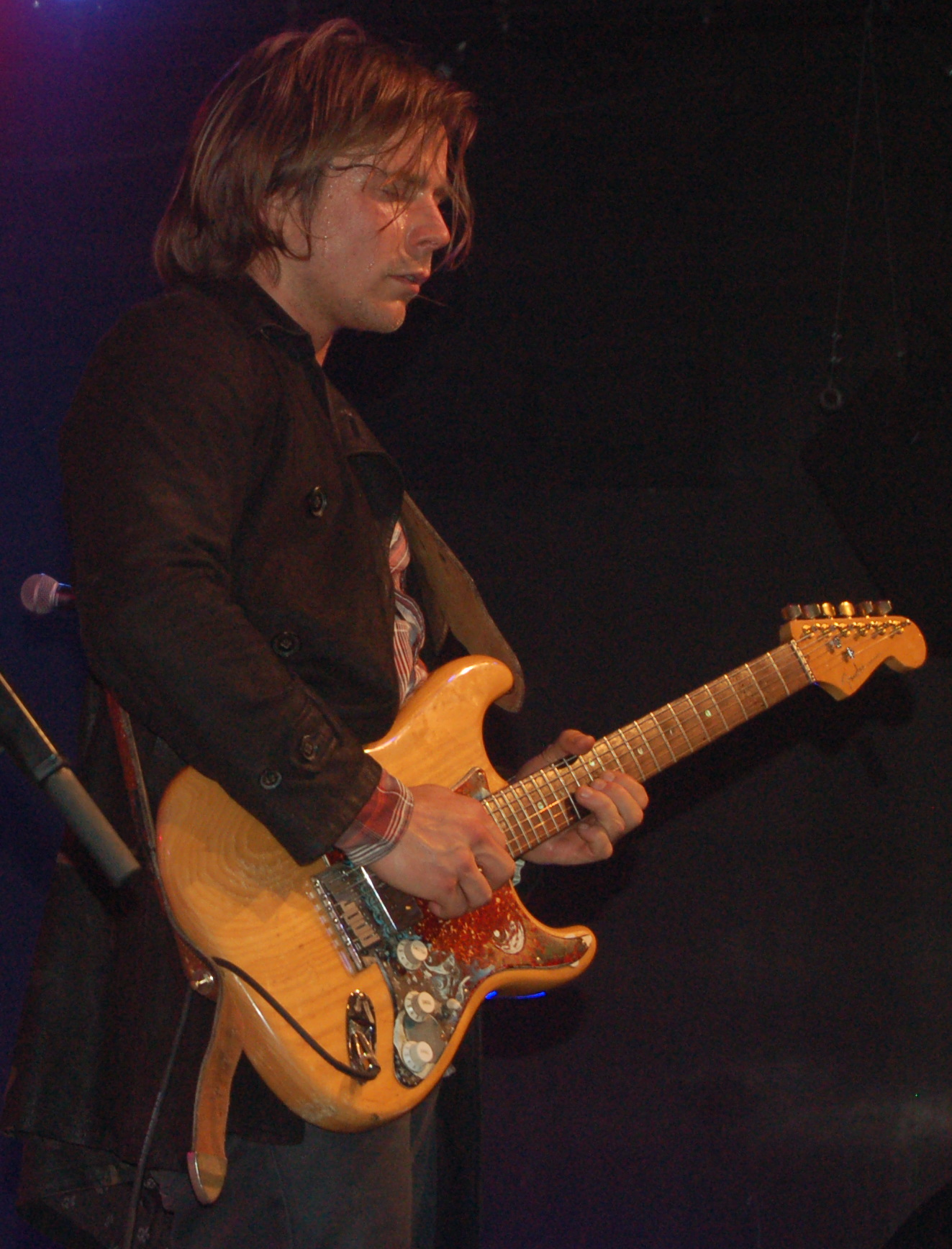
Lukas Nelson, one of the songwriters of "The Cure"

Gaga co-wrote "The Cure" with Blair, Lukas Nelson, Mark Nilan and Nick Monson, while it was produced by the singer with Monson and relatively unknown duo, Detroit City. The duo had submitted their material to Gaga's team, and they were enlisted to produce "The Cure". Sonically the track begins slow; the first verse is backed by finger snaps and an electronic dance beat. An editor from The Guardian said that the song "is built off an unadorned R&B rhythm before rising into a pop chorus". It has been described as a midtempo dancehall-inspired synth-pop and pop-soul song. Alexa Camp from Slant Magazine compared Gaga's sped up vocals with Justin Bieber's "Sorry" (2015) with the tropical house rhythm. According to the sheet music published at Musicnotes.com, the song is composed in the time signature of common time with a moderate tempo of 100 beats per minute. It is sung in the key of A♭ major with Gaga's vocals spanning from A♭_{3} to E♭_{5}. The song follows a chord progression of Fm_{7}–A♭maj_{7}–D♭maj_{7}–E♭ in the verses and Fm–D♭–E♭–A♭ in the chorus.

Lyrically, the song talks about the healing effect of love. In an article for Bustle, Danielle Jackson presumed it to be love from her fans who had supported Gaga throughout her career. While performing "The Cure" at Coachella, the singer said to the crowd: "I love you guys so much. I have been through so much in my life and I've seen so much. And you cure me every time with your love." The dedication-like lyrics begins with the singer comparing her music as an escape route for her fans. This is expanded upon in the chorus when Gaga belts "If I can't find the cure, I'll, I'll fix you with my love", thus positioning herself as someone who advocates for the troubling time in anyone's life, evident by the closing line "Promise I'll always be there, Promise I'll be the cure". Ally Hirschalg from Mic also found other explanations from the lyrics: a mother talking to her children and someone who had a recent break-up, the latter alluding to Gaga's break-up with fiancée Taylor Kinney the previous year.

== Release and promotion ==
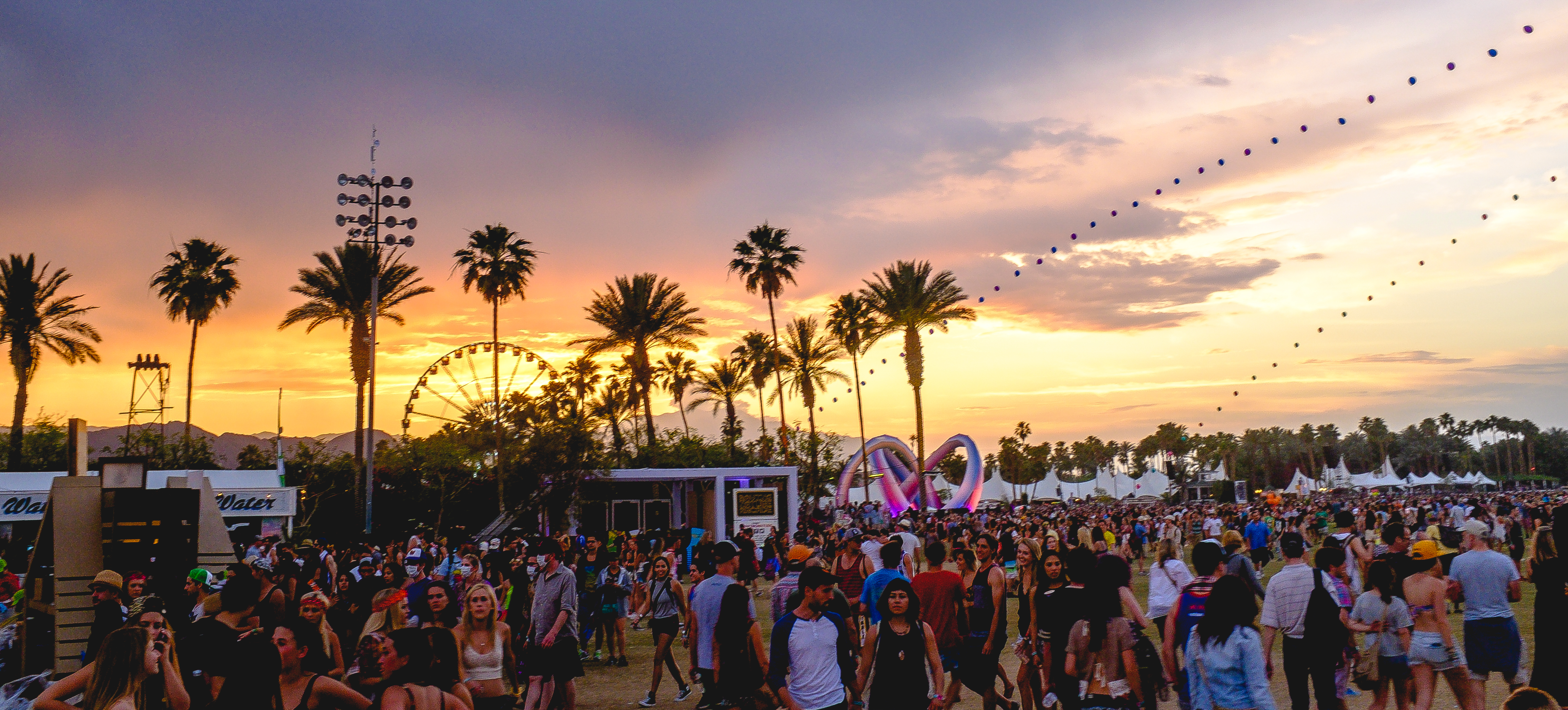
The Coachella Valley Music and Arts Festival (pictured here in 2014), where "The Cure" was premiered by Gaga.

In March 2017, it was announced that Gaga would be replacing Beyoncé as a headliner for 2017's Coachella Valley Music and Arts Festival due to Beyoncé's second pregnancy. While performing at the festival on April 16, 2017, Gaga said to the crowd: "I've been so excited for this next part of the show because I've been trying to keep it a secret for so long. I've been in the studio and I'd like to debut a brand new song, 'The Cure'" and played the song for the first time. After her set was done, the song was released on iTunes, Spotify, Apple Music, Amazon, and Google Play. It was sent to Italian contemporary hit radio stations on April 21, 2017 and American stations four days later.

Gaga released a lyric video for the song on May 1, 2017. It features the singer inside a small square clip in the center of the screen, sitting on a turquoise sofa in a lounge-like room as the camera pans around her. The lyrics swirl around the frame showing the singer, and change from black to white and vice versa. Daniel Kreps from Rolling Stone described it as "seizure-tempting fashion". Jeremy Goron from Spin called it "completely incomprehensible, running in an unreadable ring around Gaga". According to Digital Spy's Joe Anderton, the "psychedelic" nature of the video generated a "huge response" on social media, with fans and audience creating GIF images by incorporating their own visuals alongside the lyrics.

After premiering the song at Coachella, Gaga added the song to the setlist of the Joanne World Tour (2017–2018), where it was performed as the last song before the encore. She was wearing a crystal embellished bodysuit and Giuseppe Zanotti booties while singing the song. On November 19, 2017, Gaga performed "The Cure" live for the American Music Awards, from the tour stop at Capital One Arena in Washington, D.C. The singer started performing on piano and gradually moved to a rising stage for executing choreographed dance moves. She wore a dress by late designer Azzedine Alaïa, as a tribute to him. This was the first televised performance of the song, and Gaga's second consecutive year performing at the American Music Awards.

== Critical reception ==
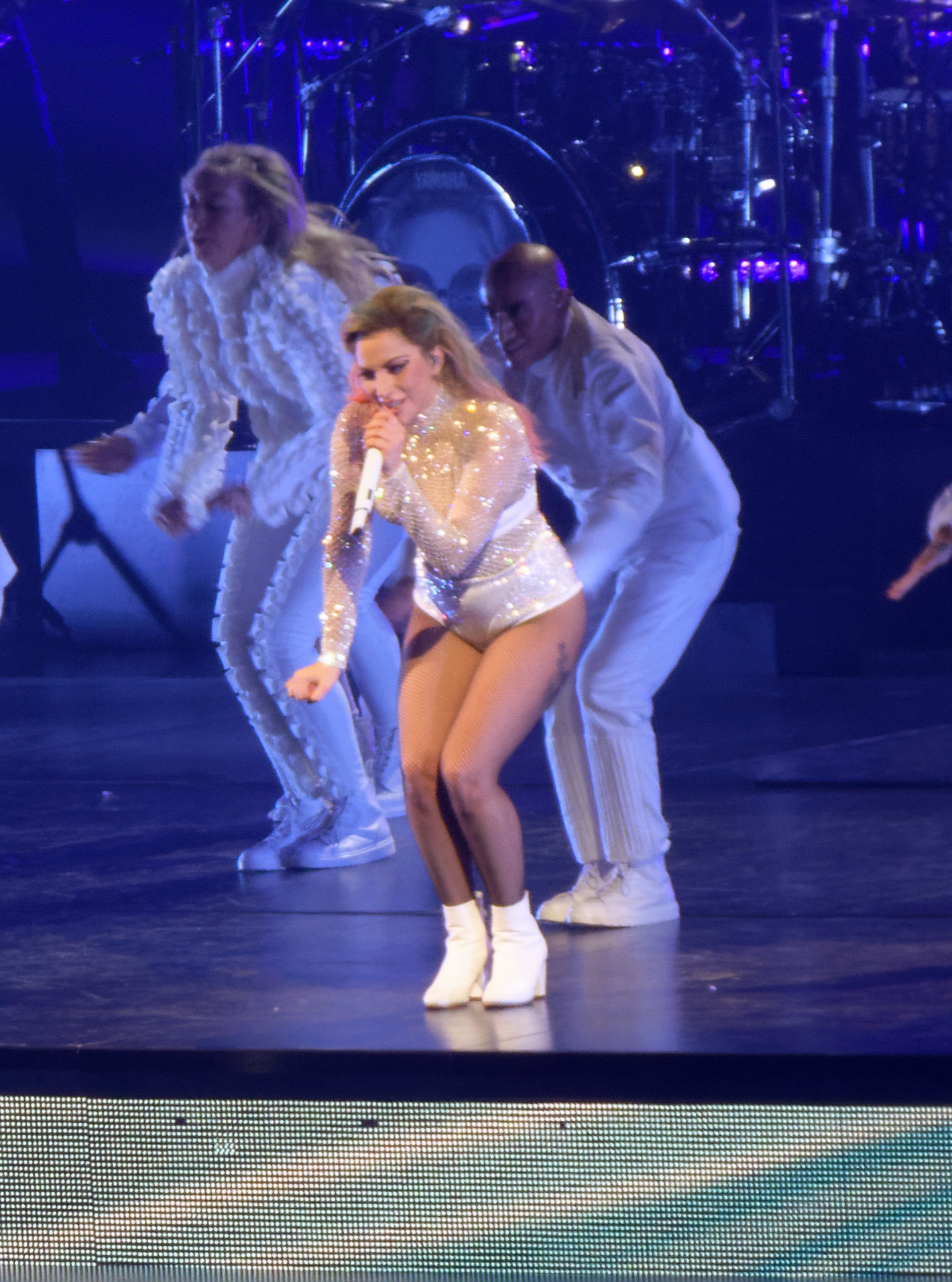
Gaga performing "The Cure" at the Joanne World Tour

Jason Lipshutz from Billboard complimented the "slower tempo" and the "new jam just in time for summer" feel of the track, but he also said that the stylistic and sonic shift from Joanne to "The Cure" felt like "an abrupt course correction, meant to build momentum ahead of her summer tour". Hugh McIntyre from Forbes said that the track "is a noticeable departure from anything Gaga has ever released before". He described it as a "fun, catchy tune", but felt it was less risky or less dance-like than previous songs like "Bad Romance", "Telephone" (both 2009), "Applause" (2013) or "Million Reasons" (2016). Melinda Newman from the same publication wrote that "The Cure" might be Gaga's pathway back onto pop radio, as it is a "swaying, instantly infectious slice of synth-pop that sounds like it's straight out the '80s and feels ready-made for blaring out of car stereos this summer".

Lior Philips from Consequence of Sound found influences of Gaga's "dance musicality" in "The Cure", especially in the "finger clicking, pristine clean production, anthemic flute-like synth, and her remarkable falsetto". Comparing the track to songs by OneRepublic, Philips complimented the simplicity of the verses, writing that it "intensifies the mood". Los Angeles Times writer Mikael Wood states that "The Cure" is "an intriguing midtempo pop-soul jam", with "synthetic textures", and "very Madonna circa 'Human Nature'". Amy Mackelden of Marie Claire called it a "synth-pop masterpiece that will be stuck in your head from the second you hear it" and further wrote: "The lyrics are super uplifting and relatable, especially as the chorus features the positive refrain, 'No matter what you know, I'll fix you with my love.'" Ian Monroe from V praised the song for its lyrics and called it "the song of the summer". Adam White of The Independent found it "one of Gaga's loveliest numbers".

Negative reviews came from Entertainment Weekly's Nolan Feeney, who found "The Cure" to be "generic" and resemblance with other pop songs released concurrently. But he found potential in the release, due to it being "the catchiest, most immediate, and thankfully least self-serious songs [Gaga]'s put out in recent years". Similar thoughts were echoed by Alexa Camp, who wrote in an article published by Slant Magazine that the song's "lyrics are composed of generic pop platitudes about unconditional devotion that aren't worth citing here, rendered even more forgettable by a generic hook and a lifeless vocal turn by Gaga herself".

In December 2017, Billboard named "The Cure" the 100th best song of the year.

== Chart performance ==
In the United States, "The Cure" debuted at its peak position of number 39 on the Billboard Hot 100, becoming Gaga's 20th top-forty entry on the chart. The charting was aided by the single entering the Digital Songs chart at number three, with sales of 79,000 copies according to Nielsen SoundScan. "The Cure" gradually fluctuated on the Hot 100, and remained on the chart for a total of 14 weeks. On the airplay charts monitored by Billboard, the track entered at number 39 on the Mainstream Top 40 chart. "The Cure" continued to move up the radio charts, reaching peak positions of number 20 on the Mainstream Top 40 and number 17 on the Adult Pop Songs charts. As of September 2017, it has sold 407,215 copies in the nation. The Recording Industry Association of America (RIAA) certified it platinum for selling over a million equivalent units in the country. On the Canadian Hot 100, "The Cure" debuted at number 49 on the chart, and reached a peak of number 33 in its fourth week.

In the United Kingdom, "The Cure" sold 12,774 digital downloads and entered at number 4 on the UK Download Chart. It was also streamed 889,730 times, and combined the track entered the UK Singles Chart at number 23 (with a total of 18,705 equivalent units). The next week, it moved up to number 19 on the chart, selling another 20,978 equivalent units. In March 2019, it was certified Gold by the British Phonographic Industry (BPI) for selling over 400,000 units in the country. In Australia, the song debuted at number 17 on the ARIA Singles Chart and moved up to number 10 the next week. It was Gaga's first top 10 song in the country since "The Edge of Glory" reached number 2 in 2011. The Australian Recording Industry Association (ARIA) certified it triple platinum for shipment of 210,000 copies.

== Credits and personnel ==
Credits adapted from iTunes Store listing.

- Lady Gaga – lead vocals, songwriter, producer
- Nick Monson – producer, songwriter
- Paul "DJ White Shadow" Blair – songwriter
- Lukas Nelson – songwriter
- Mark Nilan – songwriter
- Detroit City (Paul "DJ White Shadow" Blair) – producer

== Charts ==
=== Weekly charts ===
Weekly chart performance for "The Cure"
Chart (2017)	Peak position
Australia (ARIA)	10
Austria (Ö3 Austria Top 40)	37
Belgium (Ultratop 50 Flanders)	30
Belgium (Ultratop 50 Wallonia)	39
Canada Hot 100 (Billboard)	33
Canada AC (Billboard)	36
Canada CHR/Top 40 (Billboard)	22
Canada Hot AC (Billboard)	15
Croatia International Airplay (Top lista)	13
Czech Republic Airplay (ČNS IFPI)	38
Czech Republic Singles Digital (ČNS IFPI)	20
Euro Digital Songs (Billboard)	7
Finland Download (Latauslista)	2
France (SNEP)	108
Germany (GfK)	57
Greece Digital Songs (Billboard)	3
Hungary (Rádiós Top 40)	26
Hungary (Single Top 40)	4
Ireland (IRMA)	24
Italy (FIMI)	36
Japan Hot 100 (Billboard)	23
Latvia (Latvijas Top 40)	19
Lebanon (Lebanese Top 20)	10
Malaysia (RIM)	20
Netherlands (Dutch Top 40 Tipparade)	5
Netherlands (Single Top 100)	80
New Zealand Heatseekers (RMNZ)	3
Philippines (Philippine Hot 100)	37
Portugal (AFP)	31
Scottish Singles Sales (Official Charts)	4
Slovakia Airplay (ČNS IFPI)	15
Slovakia Singles Digital (ČNS IFPI)	8
South Korea Download (GAON)	57
Spain (Promusicae)	57
Sweden (Sverigetopplistan)	51
Switzerland (Schweizer Hitparade)	41
UK Singles (Official Charts)	19
Ukraine Airplay (TopHit)	37
US Billboard Hot 100	39
US Adult Contemporary (Billboard)	28
US Adult Pop Airplay (Billboard)	17
US Dance Club Songs (Billboard)	23
US Dance Airplay (Billboard)	33
US Pop Airplay (Billboard)	20
Ukraine Airplay (TopHit)	37
Venezuela English (Record Report)	58

=== Year-end charts ===
2017 year-end chart performance for "The Cure"
Chart (2017)	Position
Australia (ARIA)	86
Belgium (Ultratop 50 Flanders)	82
Brazil (Pro-Música Brasil)	187

== Certifications and sales ==
Certifications and sales for "The Cure"
Region	Certification	Certified units/sales
Australia (ARIA)	3× Platinum	210,000^{‡}
Brazil (Pro-Música Brasil)	2× Platinum	120,000^{‡}
Italy (FIMI)	Platinum	50,000^{‡}
New Zealand (RMNZ)	Platinum	30,000^{‡}
United Kingdom (BPI)	Gold	431,000
United States (RIAA)	Platinum	1,000,000^{‡}
^{‡} Sales+streaming figures based on certification alone.

== Release history ==
Release dates and formats for "The Cure"
Region	Date	Format(s)	Label(s)	Ref.
Various	April 16, 2017	Digital download; streaming	Interscope	
Italy	April 21, 2017	Radio airplay	Universal	
United States	April 25, 2017	Contemporary hit radio	Streamline; Interscope	
United States	May 8, 2017	Adult contemporary radio; hot adult contemporary radio; modern adult contemporary radio	Streamline; Interscope	
