= Joanne World Tour =

2017–2018 concert tour by Lady Gaga

- World tour by Lady Gaga
- Promotional poster
- Location: Europe; North America
- Associated album: Joanne
- Start date: August 1, 2017
- End date: February 1, 2018
- Legs: 3
- No. of shows: 49
- Supporting act: DJ White Shadow
- Attendance: 841,935
- Box office: $94.9 million ($121.67 million in 2025 dollars)

Lady Gaga concert chronology
- Dive Bar Tour (2016); Joanne World Tour (2017–2018); Lady Gaga Enigma + Jazz & Piano (2018–2024)

The Joanne World Tour was the sixth headlining concert tour by American singer Lady Gaga, in support of her fifth studio album, Joanne (2016). It began on August 1, 2017, in Vancouver, Canada and ended on February 1, 2018, in Birmingham, England. After tickets went on sale, various shows in Europe and North America quickly sold out, prompting additional dates in both continents. Due to chronic pain caused by fibromyalgia, Gaga was forced to cancel the last 10 shows of the concert series.

The tour featured a large multi-level stage with moving platforms, satellite stages and elevated bridges that allowed Gaga to perform across the arena. She wore various outfits largely inspired by Western and avant-garde aesthetics, working with designers such as Alexander Wang and Norma Kamali. The concert series was noted for a more scaled-back tone compared with Gaga's previous tours, though critics widely praised its visual staging, Gaga's vocal performances, and her connection with the audience. Some reviewers, however, criticized the show's pacing and frequent costume-change interludes. The Joanne World Tour ultimately grossed nearly $95 million from 842,000 tickets sold.

== Development ==
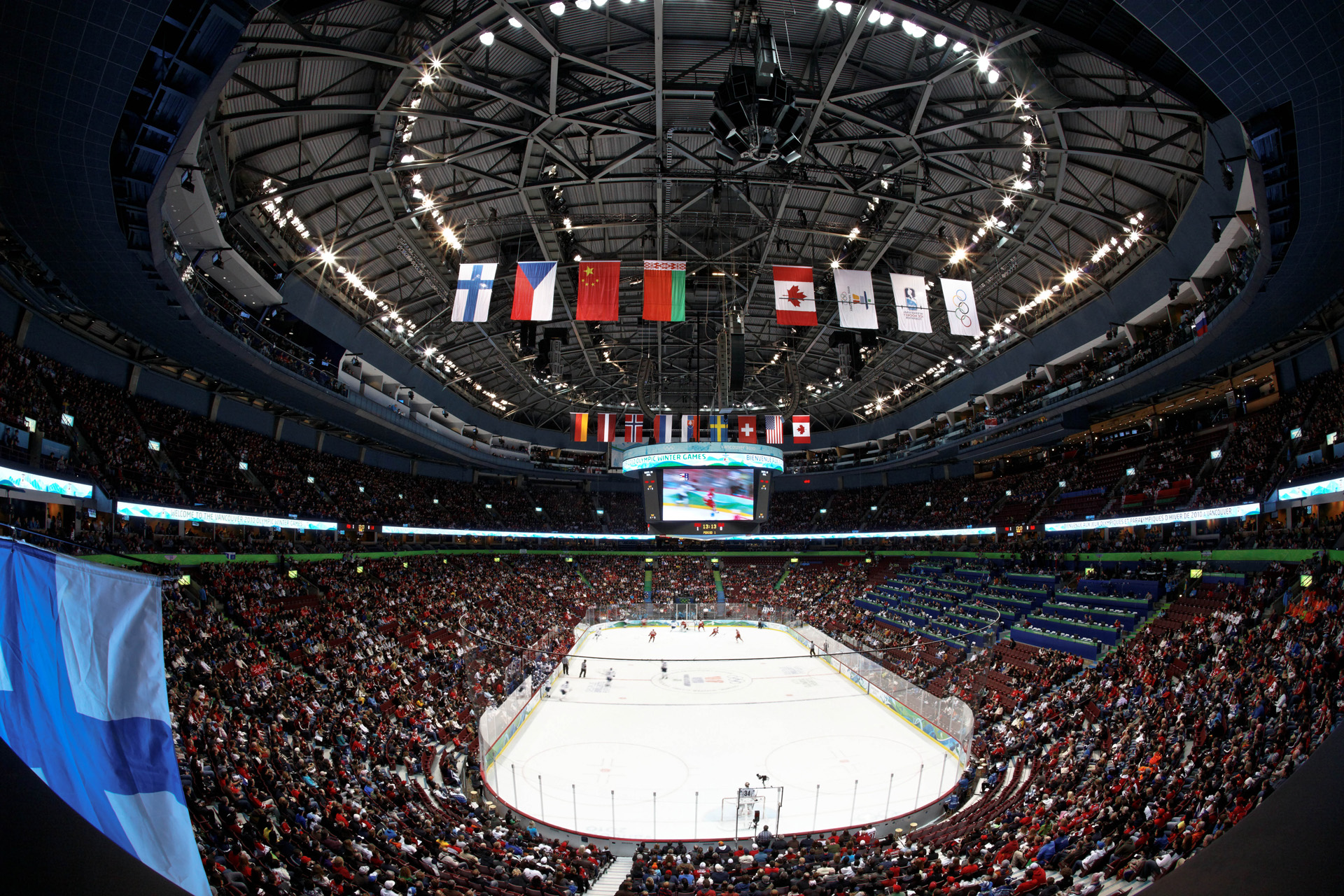
Vancouver's Rogers Arena, where the Joanne World Tour started

Two weeks before Lady Gaga's fifth studio album, Joanne, was released in October 2016, she began a small promotional tour called the Dive Bar Tour, which visited bars across the US. On October 24, 2016, she confirmed to Howard Stern that she would also embark on a worldwide concert tour to continue promoting the record. She clarified that it would begin after her performance at the Super Bowl LI halftime show, that took place on February 5, 2017. Following the halftime show, Gaga announced the Joanne World Tour which began on August 1, 2017, at Vancouver's Rogers Arena and would continue till December 18, 2017, ending at Inglewood, California's The Forum venue, for a total of 60 shows across North and South America and Europe.

On March 2, 2017, Coachella announced Gaga as a main headliner of the festival in Indio after Beyoncé had to cancel her appearance due to pregnancy. Billboard reported that the tour would start with the Coachella performances, four months earlier than originally expected. However, in an interview with Entertainment Weekly, Gaga's choreographer Richard Jackson confirmed that the performances at Coachella was exclusively for the festival and the Joanne World Tour would be completely different. Nevertheless, elements from the festival performance as well as from the Super Bowl halftime show were kept and used for the tour.

Gaga's participation in the Rock in Rio festival in Brazil was supposed to be the only date in South America. However, due to being hospitalized for body pain, she had to cancel the date. On September 18, 2017, Gaga postponed the European leg of the tour as a result of further chronic pain she endured. The postponed dates were announced a few weeks later to reconvene from January 14, 2018, in Barcelona and end on February 23, 2018, in Germany. However, due to severe pain caused by fibromyalgia, Gaga was forced to cancel the remaining 10 shows of her tour, which consequently ended in Birmingham on February 1, 2018. In 2025, Gaga added that the cancelled concerts were also due to a psychotic break, explaining that her mental health had deteriorated to the point that she was on lithium while filming A Star Is Born; after being confronted by her sister, she decided to take a break and check into a hospital for psychiatric care.

DJ White Shadow–who worked as producer on Gaga's Born This Way and Artpop albums–served as the opening act on select dates of the North American leg of the tour. During the European leg, the documentary Gaga: Five Foot Two (2017) was screened in arenas before the shows began.

== Production ==
=== Conception ===
I put a lot of my soul into [Joanne] ... and I'm looking forward to integrating that with my other songs to contextualize it in a way for the fans ... More than anything I just want my fans to feel a message of liberation that they can, at any point in time, change where they are in their life and move forward.

— Gaga talking about the main idea behind the tour.

The Joanne World Tour plans had to be put on hold temporarily for the Coachella rehearsals. However, its concept was in development since the Super Bowl and rehearsals started after Gaga finished filming for A Star Is Born, her first lead role as an actress. By July 2017, Gaga told Billboard magazine that she and her team were discussing the song selection process as well as where all they would want choreography in the show. She confirmed her plans of releasing more music on tour, like standalone single "The Cure", which was released following the first Coachella performance. Gaga had also planned to play another Dive Bar stop at Las Vegas in July 2017 before kicking off the tour. She expressed a desire to have a slowed-down section during the Joanne World Tour, to connect with every person in the audience in an intimate, dive-bar-like setting. She also wanted to honor the victims of the Manchester Arena bombing, which had happened in May 2017, on every show of the tour.

In February 2017, Gaga unveiled a look-book for the tour, which would be available as part of the merchandise on the tour. The book was a collaboration between London-based creative studio Lobster Eye and merchandising company Bravado. They hired photographer Synchrodogs, and stylist Daria Lagenberg to create the photographs. Models like Stacy Koren and Daria Svertilova posed for the pictures, which showed them in a wood-inspired set. Tania Shcheglova and Roman Noven of Synchrodogs explained in an interview with Women's Wear Daily that envisioned a colorful aesthetic for the pictures, being given total freedom as to how they would create it. Wanting to mix both "artificial and natural elements", Synchrodogs used Ukrainian landscape as the backdrops for the photo shoot. The merchandise consisted of necklaces, scarves and T-shirts, with Alexa Tietjen from the Los Angeles Times commenting that "If the lookbook is any indication, the Joanne World Tour just might be Gaga's most fashionable yet." They were made available for purchase at clothing shop Urban Outfitters from May 19, 2017. Consisting of long and short-sleeved T-shirts and bomber jackets, the collection had 10 different items for men and women, with Joanne inspired artwork on them.

=== Stage ===
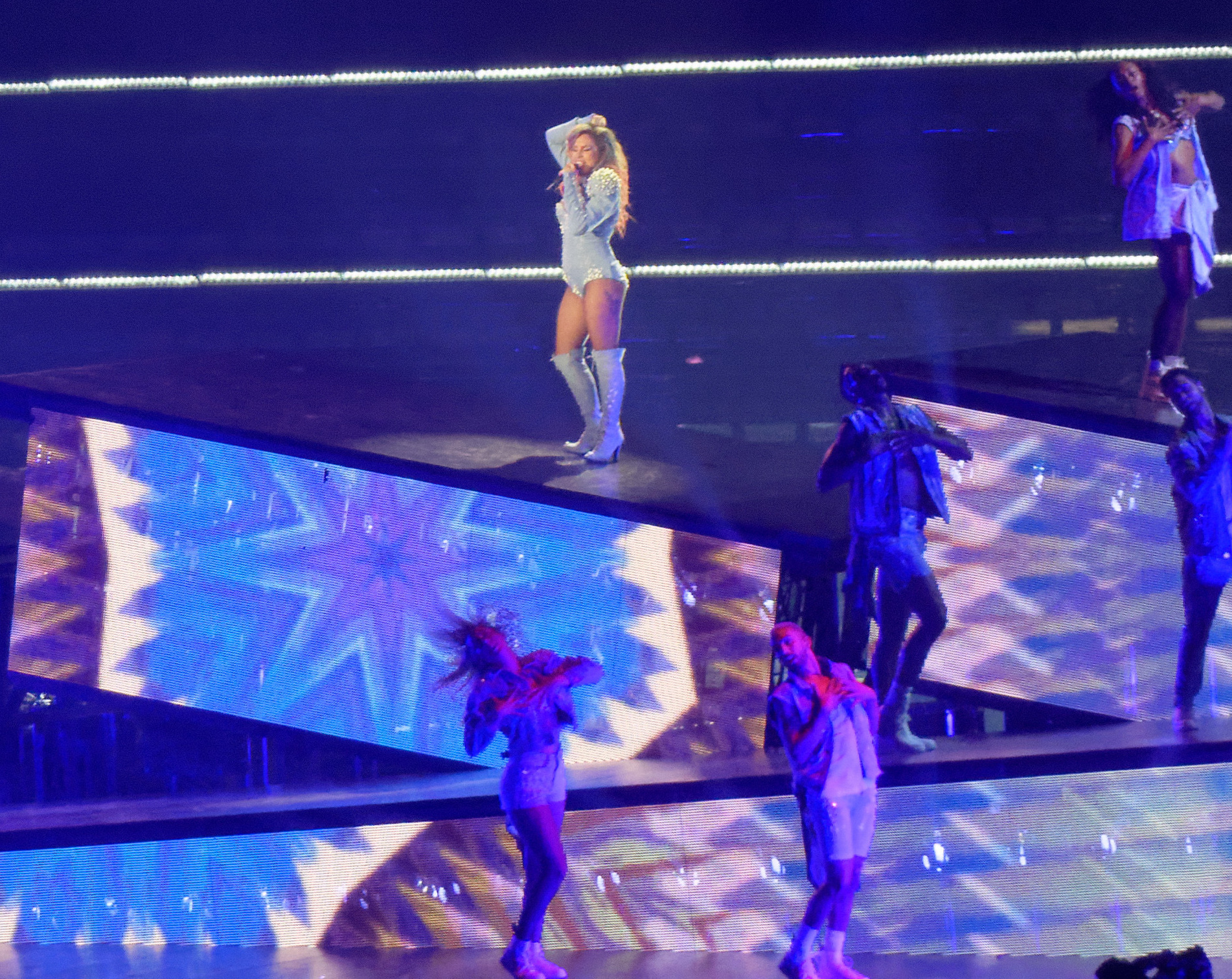
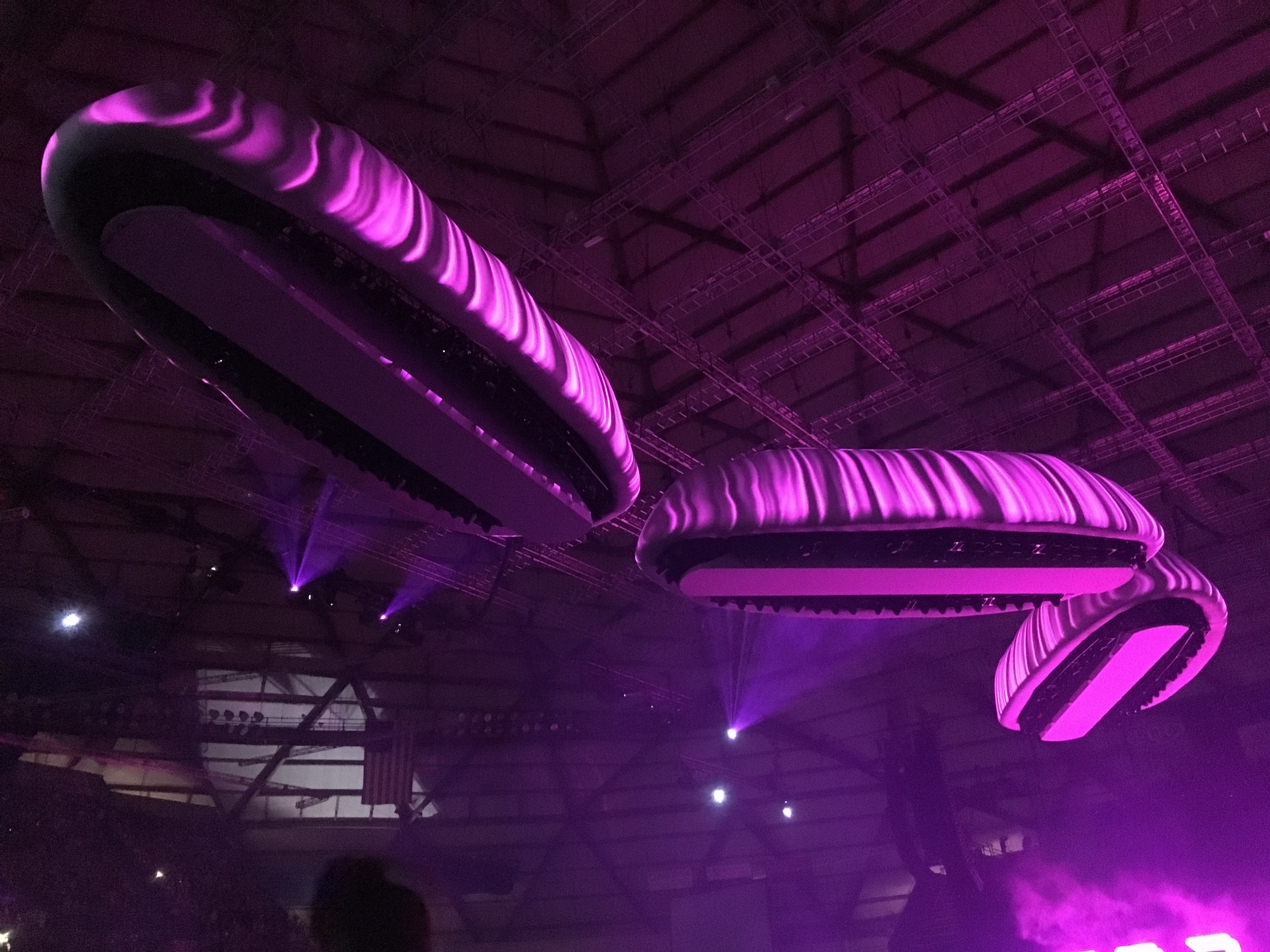
Top. Gaga and her dancers performing "Telephone" on moving platforms which the USA Today described as "tetris stages". Bottom. The three inflatable lightning pods with video projection displays.

Gaga confirmed in July 2017 that the stage design had been finalized and that construction was underway. She described the stage as different from those built for her previous tours. She also noted that lighting would play a major role in the production. The main stage was built in collaboration with Tait Inc. with production manager Robert 'Hydro' Mullin, and creative designer, LeRoy Bennett. Tait developed the stage at its rehearsal and design facilities in Lititz, Pennsylvania, where large-scale touring productions can be designed, constructed, and tested before going on the road. Gaga worked with the company during the development process as the concept moved from design to construction and rehearsal.

It is 85 feet (26 m) in width and is accompanied by two satellite stages and a b-stage. It consists of three moving platforms for staging equipment and five performer wave lifts that can move in unison with one another or independently in various different configurations. Carly Mallenbaum from USA Today called them "tetris stages", because of their changing alignments. The main three lifts are 17 feet (5.2 m) wide and aligned parallel to them are two other 50 feet (15 m) lifts. Altogether they render the different configurations and shapes to the stage: elevated, flat, criss-cross, diagonal or staircase. During the performance, the lifts frequently move in synchronized formations such as zigzags or staircase-like patterns, allowing the stage to continuously change shape throughout the show.

Additionally, 60 feet (18 m) above the audience there are three inflatable lightning pods with video projection displays, that also act as bridges. When not being used for videos, they descend to connect the main stage with the circular satellite stages and the b-stage, allowing access to the performers to move between them. When combined, the structures can form catwalk-like pathways above the audience, enabling Gaga and her dancers to traverse the arena while remaining elevated above the crowd. Through these moving platforms and stage, Gaga was able to traverse the entirety of an arena and perform close to the audience. The satellite stages also consisted of two 10 feet (3.0 m) hydraulic lifts, which raised Gaga to join a platform on the b-stage. Tait also designed a laser lit, heart-shaped piano. It was adorned with 44 laser beams, that lit up the arena and sequenced with the keypads on the piano. The 1.25-inch acrylic shell piano was enhanced by adding a mix of dichroic filmed polycarbonate fascia, thereby reflecting the beams more.

The complex staging system was coordinated through Tait's proprietary automation software, which synchronized the lifts, lighting, bridges, and other stage elements with the choreography and music to ensure that cues were executed at precise moments during the performance.

Before the tour began, Gaga said she intended to introduce new songs to the set list as the tour progressed. However, she later explained that the computer-programmed stage required precise timing, making backstage work stressful and leaving little room for changes to the set list. She said the set list could change slightly, but the show's technical demands made larger changes difficult.

=== Costume design and makeup ===
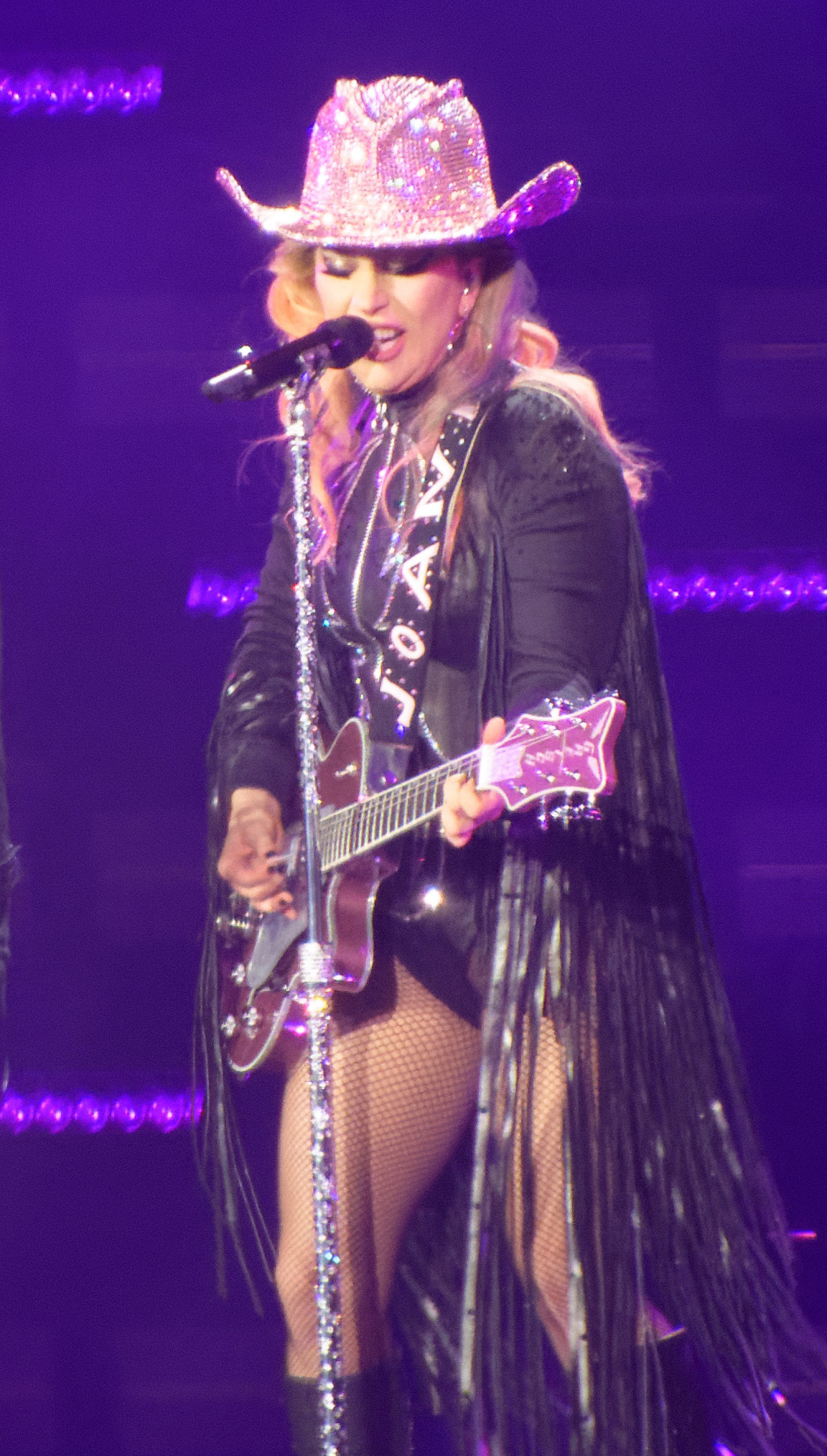
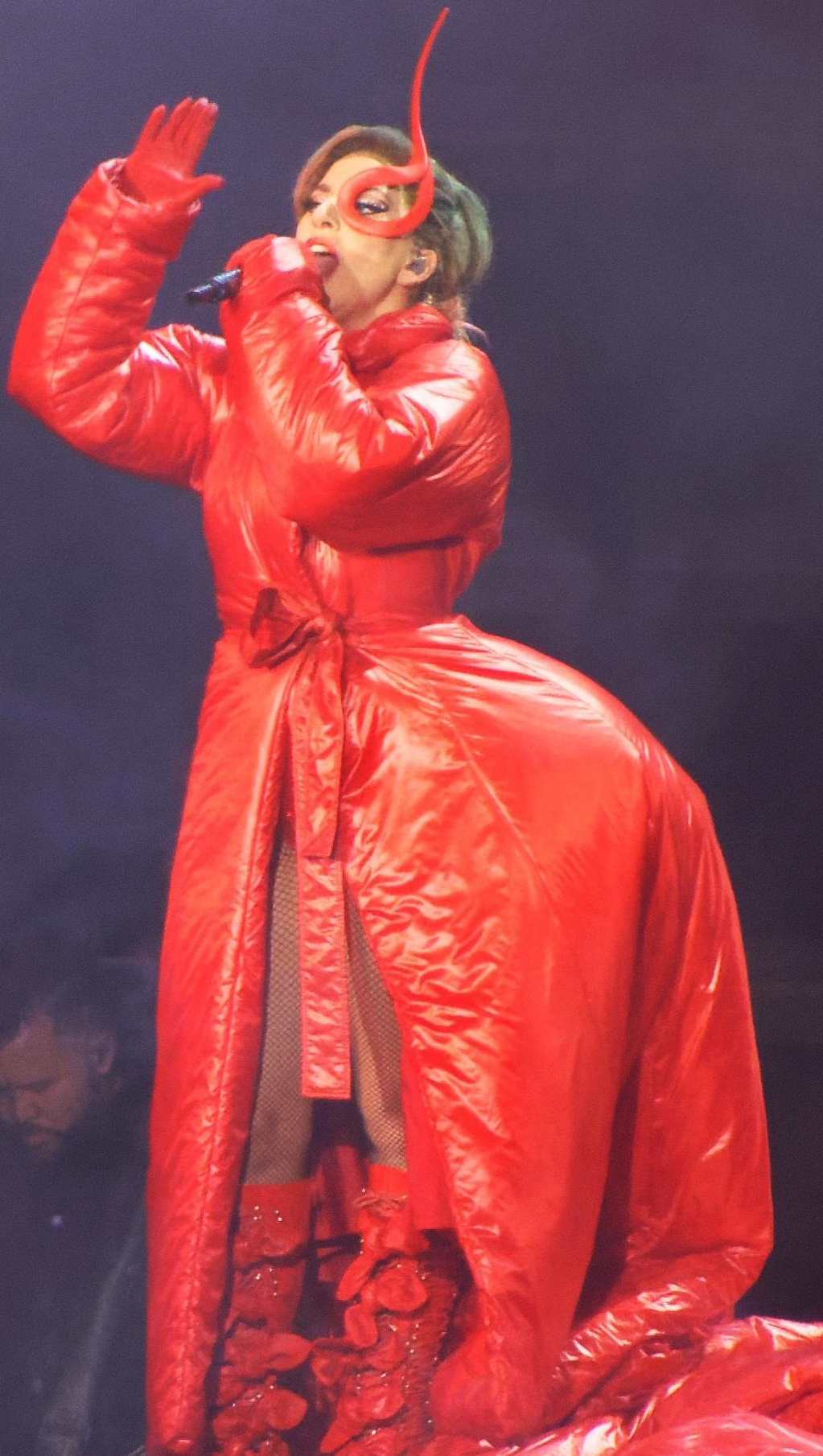
Gaga performing "A-Yo" in an Alexander Wang fringe leotard complete with a sequin hat (left) and "Bloody Mary" in a red costume noted for recalling the avant-garde aesthetic characteristic of her earlier work (right)

Like on Gaga's previous tours, the show was divided into separate segments, each preceded by a costume change. While Gaga had not shared any sketches or details concerning the costumes before the tour began, it was reported that nearly 50,000 Swarovski crystals had been used while designing the costumes and props for Gaga and the dancers. Sarah Tanno, who worked as makeup artist for the tour, has revealed that the crystals were even used on Gaga's eyes "in order to create a multi-dimensional effect that shines on stage". Gaga shared a photo on Instagram prior to the first show, giving a preview of her two-toned, orange and green wig that she later wore for the shows.

The first outfit worn by her was a black bejewelled fringe leotard with heavy embroidery, completed with a crystallized sequin hat. The ensemble was custom-made for her by Alexander Wang, who was inspired by "Gaga's incredible energy" and "the Western spirit", "as well as her transformation into Joanne". Discussing his creation with Vogue, Wang further added that the outfit was influenced by "a cowboy boot's heavy stitching and embellishments". Gaga later appeared on stage in other "Western-inspired" looks. For one of them, Gaga donned a black jacket with much leather fringe, along with black thigh-high-boots, fishnets, and a black hat. Stripping off the jacket, she was seen in a mesh leather cut-out bodysuit. A different "cowgirl" ensemble consisted of a wide-brim hat and a white, hand-painted fringe blazer, which featured song and album titles from her past discography and lyrics from the track, "Perfect Illusion".

For a performance that involved a new version of Gaga's characteristic "disco-stick" prop from the Super Bowl LI halftime show, she also changed into a long sleeve light blue leather bodysuit with dramatic shoulder pads, scattered pearls, and matching, knee-high boots. Another outfit was a black velvet bodysuit with rose embellished sleeves and custom black velvet block-heel booties designed by Giuseppe Zanotti, which were later completed with a white ball gown skirt. Gaga later dressed up in a bold red Norma Kamali "sleeping bag" puffer coat with a 10-foot-long train and an eye mask. Lauren Alexis Fisher from Harper's Bazaar remarked that Gaga brought back "the avant garde looks she's always embraced" with the outfit. After taking off the coat, Gaga started performing in a red leather bodysuit and tassel leather boots. She also wore a geometric white jacket with multiple bows on both arms, completed with a feathered masquerade mask and a second set of Giuseppe Zanotti heels with a crystal ankle strap. The ensemble has been compared to Gaga's look during The Fame Monster era. She later removed the jacket, revealing a glittering long-sleeve, mock neck leotard underneath. For the encore, Gaga donned a sparkling, crystal-embellished robe coat and the same pink hat designed by milliner Gladys Tamez as seen on the cover of Joanne.

== Concert synopsis ==
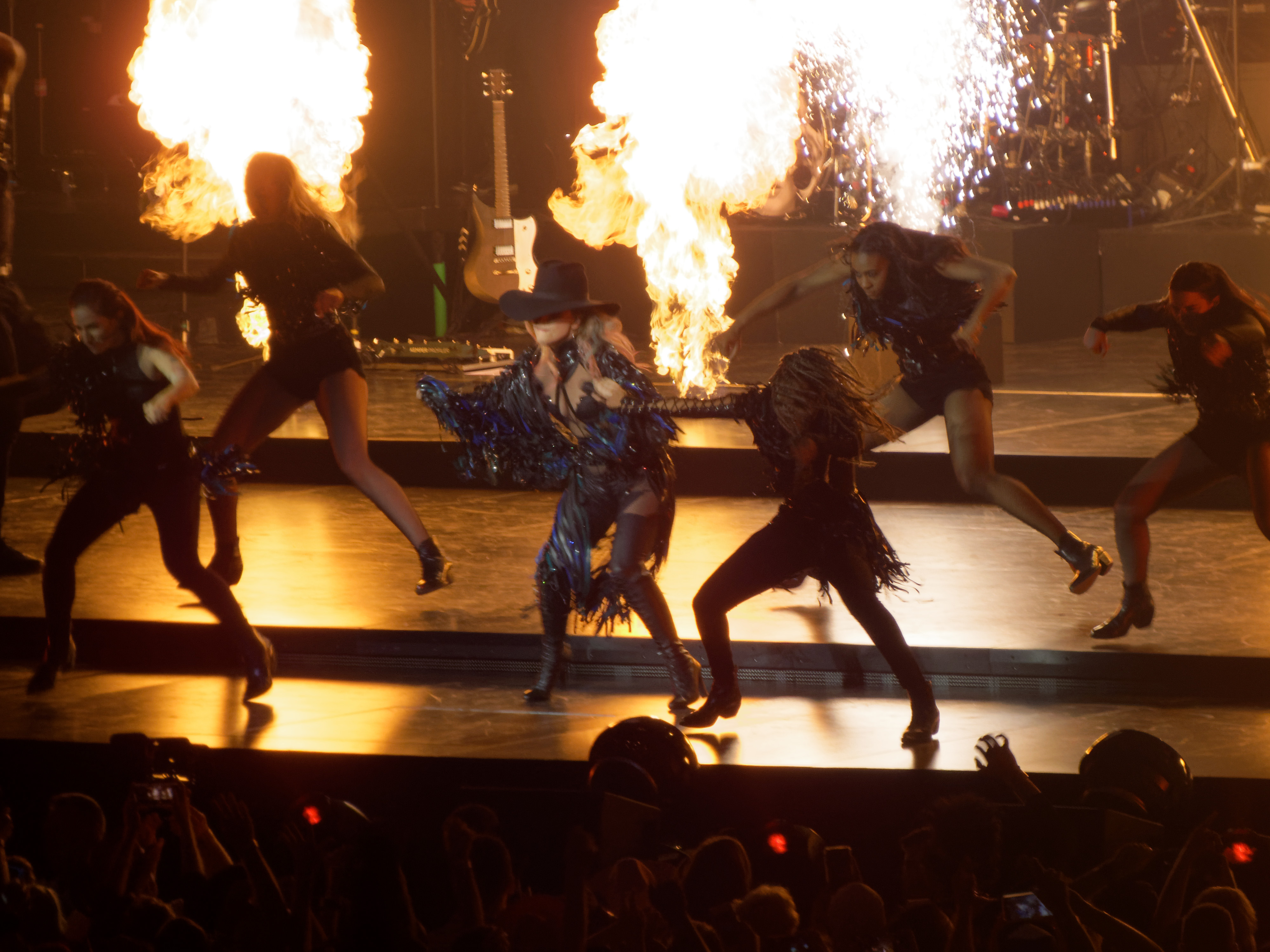
Gaga performing "John Wayne" while flamethrowers spit fire in the background

The show begins with a countdown displayed on a large screen, with the line "Don't call me Gaga" repeatedly played from the speakers. After Gaga shouts out that she instead wants to be called Joanne, she starts performing "Diamond Heart", standing solely on a raised platform with a microphone stand. She then moves on to sing "A-Yo", while playing on a guitar, and her dancers and guitarists also appear on stage. The show then continues with a choreographed performance of "Poker Face" with her dancers clad in black cowboy-style leather costumes. The first act of the show is concluded by "Perfect Illusion", followed by a video interlude that shows Gaga driving a vintage convertible letting out pink smoke. "John Wayne" is performed with pyrotechnic effects alongside her dancers. This is followed by "Scheiße", performed on the raised platforms. After a solo performance of "Alejandro", Gaga leaves the stage for a costume change.

Following another video interlude, depicting Gaga with rhino horns, Gaga appears on stage playing her keytar to "Just Dance". "LoveGame" and "Telephone" follows the performance, the former using her characteristic disco-stick. During "Applause", the three lightning pods that were used for video projection are lowered, forming bridges for Gaga and her dancers to cross between the b-stages, allowing them to get to the piano by the end of the song. Here Gaga gives a speech to the crowd and then starts singing "Come to Mama" and "The Edge of Glory" on the piano. Changing into a ball gown, Gaga performs "Born This Way" accompanied by colorful lighting effects.

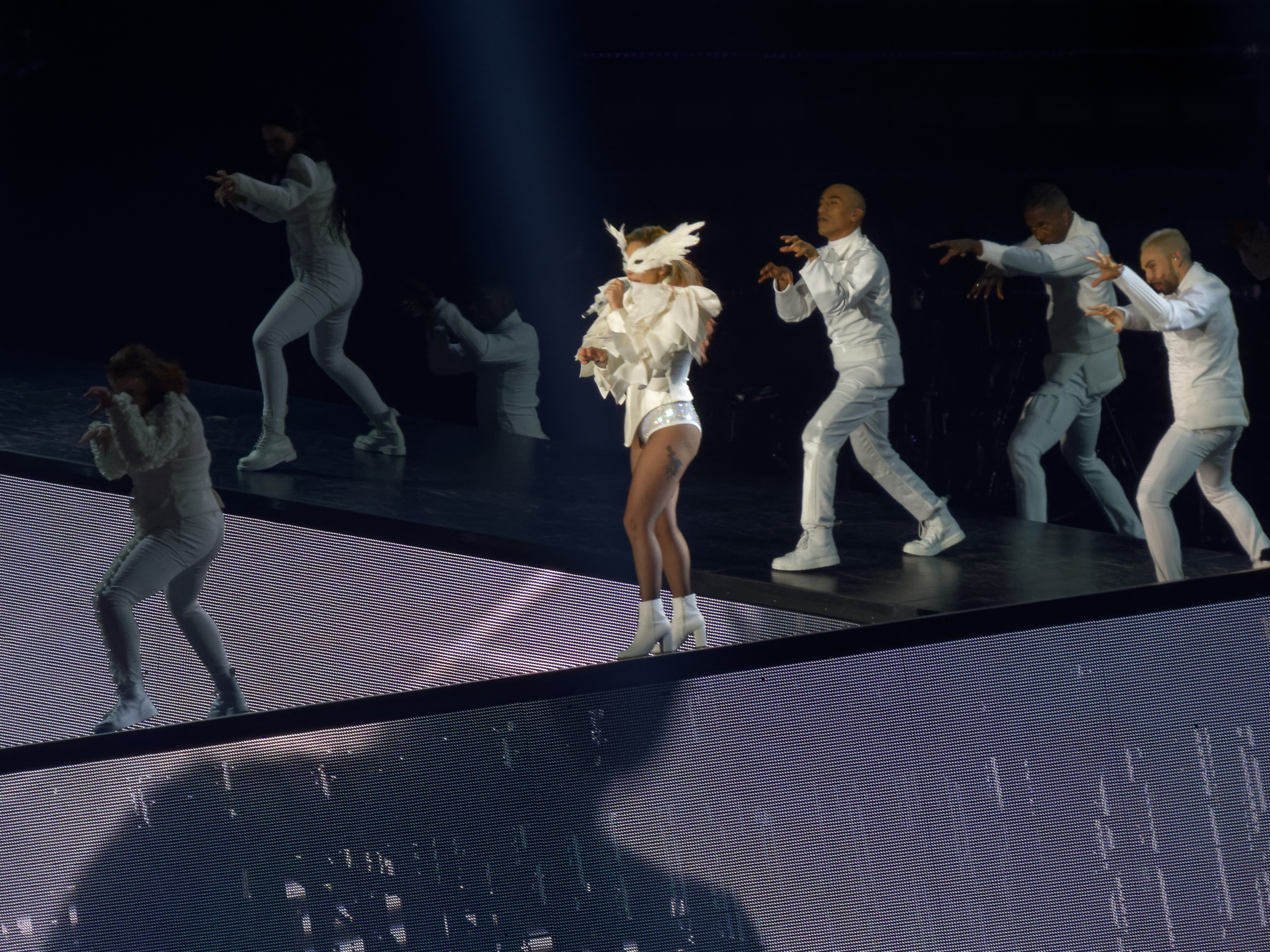
Gaga during the performance of "Bad Romance"

After another video interlude, Gaga returns to sing "Bloody Mary" in a puffer coat red dress, which is changed into a red bodysuit for "Dancin' in Circles". Gaga then performs "Paparazzi" portraying a choreographed battle onstage, showing someone stalked and murdered. Ambulance sirens are heard and a cross with a red and blue background is displayed as one of the pods are lifted, containing her. The show then shifts into "Angel Down" as the pod that contained Gaga, now in a white fringe blazer and a brownish hat with a feather, is lowered halfway. Gaga then goes down to the platform to tell the audience a story about her late aunt, Joanne Germanotta, before sitting down on a stool, guitar in-hand to perform the album title track.

The final segment begins with "Bad Romance", with Gaga and her dancers all decked in white, followed by "The Cure" with full choreography. She takes a bow and leaves the stage, only to return a few minutes later for the encore, wearing a long silver sparkling jacket paired with the signature pink hat. "Million Reasons" is sung on piano, with Gaga standing atop it, and the show ends with her disappearing under the stage, while leaving the pink hat behind on the piano stool.

== Commercial performance ==
=== Ticket sales ===
According to Live Nation, all the arena dates of the tour had general admission as well as reserved seat tickets listed. Special privileges were provided to Citibank card holders, who had the opportunity to utilize the pre-sale in cities like Los Angeles and Philadelphia, although there was a limit of 8 tickets per transaction for any buyer. For every ticket sold for the United States shows, Live Nation also announced that US$1 would be given to Gaga's Born This Way Foundation.

The company announced that there were high demands for tickets across North America and Europe, when tickets went on for sale on February 13, 2017. All the dates for the North American leg were instantly sold out leading to secondary dates being added in cities like Las Vegas, Inglewood, Toronto and Philadelphia as well as at New York City's Citi Field and Boston's Fenway Park. There were further sold-out shows reported for the tour dates in Tacoma, Omaha, Vancouver, Edmonton, San Francisco, Chicago and Montreal among others. Similar demand was observed in Europe where tickets had gone on sale three days earlier, leading to sell-outs. Barcelona, Birmingham, London and Paris were sold out immediately with Live Nation promptly announcing secondary dates. A press release from the company alerted that minimum tickets were available for the dates with the high demand.

=== Boxscore ===
Billboard revealed the first North American boxscores for the tour in August 2017. Total gross was at $8.7 million, with 78,530 tickets sold from four sold-out shows. The shows at Inglewood's The Forum provided both the highest gross and ticket sales of the shows reported, grossing $3.6 million with an attendance of 28,567. The first American show, at Tacoma Dome in Tacoma, produced the top sales and attendance among the arenas that hosted only one show, grossing $2.1 million and an attendance of 19,296 — a 36% increase both in gross and ticket sales compared to her previous Born This Way Ball tour show at the arena. Bob Allen from the magazine noted a 72% increase for the most expensive tickets at the venue in comparison to Born This Way Ball — from $175 to $251. She added another $11.9 million to the gross, and was the top boxscore artist in the next published totals in Billboard, with 103,162 tickets sold.

As the first leg came to end, Billboard reported the totals as $52 million, with over 440,000 tickets sold and a total of 20 sold-out concerts. The stadium shows averaged at 36,500 per concert, while in the arenas the average was 15,800. The latter was more than the average of her previous tours: ArtRave: The Artpop Ball (2014) had an average of 12,300 attendance while Born This Way Ball (2012–2013) raked in at 12,400 during its 10-month run. Pollstar revealed that the North American leg grossed $85.7 million in total, with 737,155 tickets sold. It was ranked at number 14 on Pollstar's year end tabulation of the Top 100 Worldwide Tours of 2017, with $2.45 million average gross from over 35 reported dates. At the 2018 Ticketmaster Awards, it won the inaugural Touring Milestone Award for having sold more than 500,000 tickets. The tour ultimately grossed $95 million from 842,000 tickets sold.

== Critical reception ==
=== North America ===
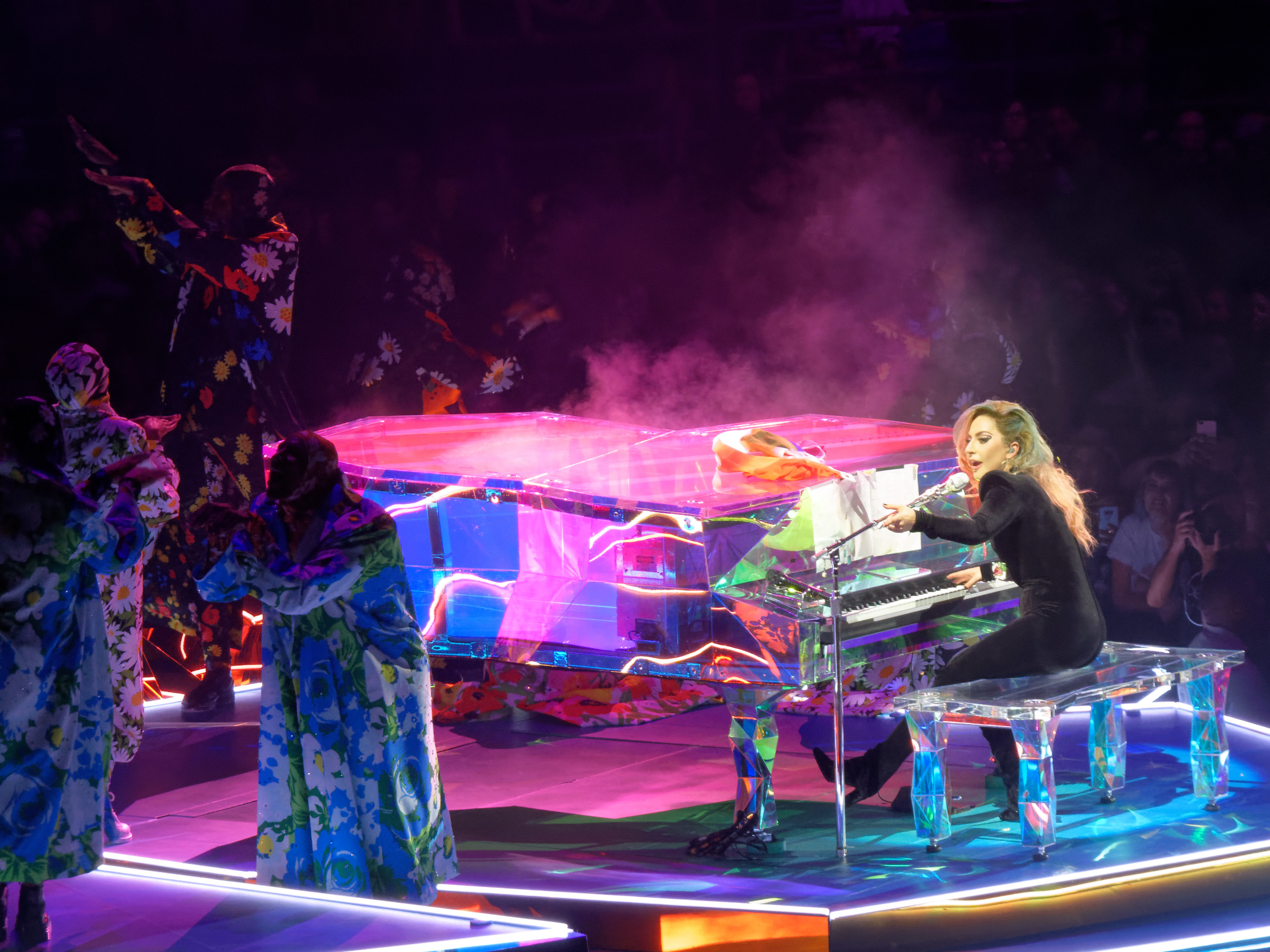
Gaga performing "Come to Mama" on the heart-shaped acrylic piano. The acoustic performances received the most praise from journalists.

Tom Murray from the Edmonton Journal was very positive in his review, calling the Joanne World Tour "a big, over-the-top assault on the senses" and adding that it was "as impressive as an arena show gets", with its dramatic arc relying as much on Gaga's charisma and vocal ability as on the special effects. Alex Stedman for Variety wrote that Gaga could do "more than your average pop star", praising her "unfaltering vocals and high-energy showmanship" while also highlighting the set as one of the show's most impressive elements. In another positive review, Las Vegas Weekly's Josh Bell wrote that even if Gaga's studio albums had become "more scattered and uneven", she remained a "fantastic" live act, bringing together "the best of her music, her fashion sense, her vocal skills and her charismatic personality into a two-hour stage spectacle." Brett Milano of the Boston Herald praised Gaga's vocal ability, describing her as a "remarkable singer" comfortable across styles ranging from blue-eyed soul and dance music to cabaret. He also noted that there was no noticeable lip-synching during the concert, calling it a "pretty big exception to the rule" for mainstream pop stars, and wrote that the performance hinted at a potentially more intimate phase in her career while still delivering spectacle and emotion.

Jon Caramanica from The New York Times felt that the first part of the show was "disjointed, shifting styles and attitudes seemingly at random", but Gaga later "struck a rhythm". He further complimented the piano sessions, writing that "Gaga was at home" with the instrument. Selena Fragassi from the Chicago Sun-Times complimented the set design, the costumes, and Gaga's "nearly pitch-perfect" vocals, saying that the show is "just another testament to Gaga's star power". However, she was critical of Gaga's dancing abilities, saying that she was "a shadow of her former dancing self, relying on years-old choreography and struggling to keep her balance on 'Bad Romance'." Similarly, Mikael Wood from the Los Angeles Times believed that the ballads were the concert's highlight, adding that "she's begun to tire of carefully synchronizing all those moving parts. In busy old hits like 'LoveGame' and 'Telephone', Lady Gaga put across little visible excitement". Richard Burnett of the Montreal Gazette gave the show a positive review, writing that although the concert sometimes lacked overall musical momentum, this was more than compensated for by the eye-catching multiplatform main stage and its elaborate special effects. Adam Graham of The Detroit News called Gaga "dynamite throughout the night" and praised her strong connection with the audience, though he criticized the lengthy costume changes, writing that her band had to fill the gaps with extended vamping.

=== Europe ===
Alexis Petridis from The Guardian gave the show four out of five stars, highlighting Gaga's performances during the acoustic segments and her rapport with the audience as standout moments. He added that while the production was far from understated, the "weirdness" that once defined her earlier tours had been noticeably toned down. Alice Vincent from The Daily Telegraph also noted that the Joanne Tour is "a more minimalist affair", arguing that Gaga's appeal lies less in gimmicks or dramatic reinventions than in the consistency of her persona beneath them. Writing for Vice, Hannah Ewens observed that the tour reflected a tension between Gaga's theatrical persona and the more vulnerable image presented during the Joanne era and in the documentary Gaga: Five Foot Two. She noted that the production alternated between stripped-down, "dive bar"-style performances and the extravagant staging associated with Gaga's earlier tours, describing the performances of "Joanne" and "Million Reasons" as among the most affecting moments of the show.

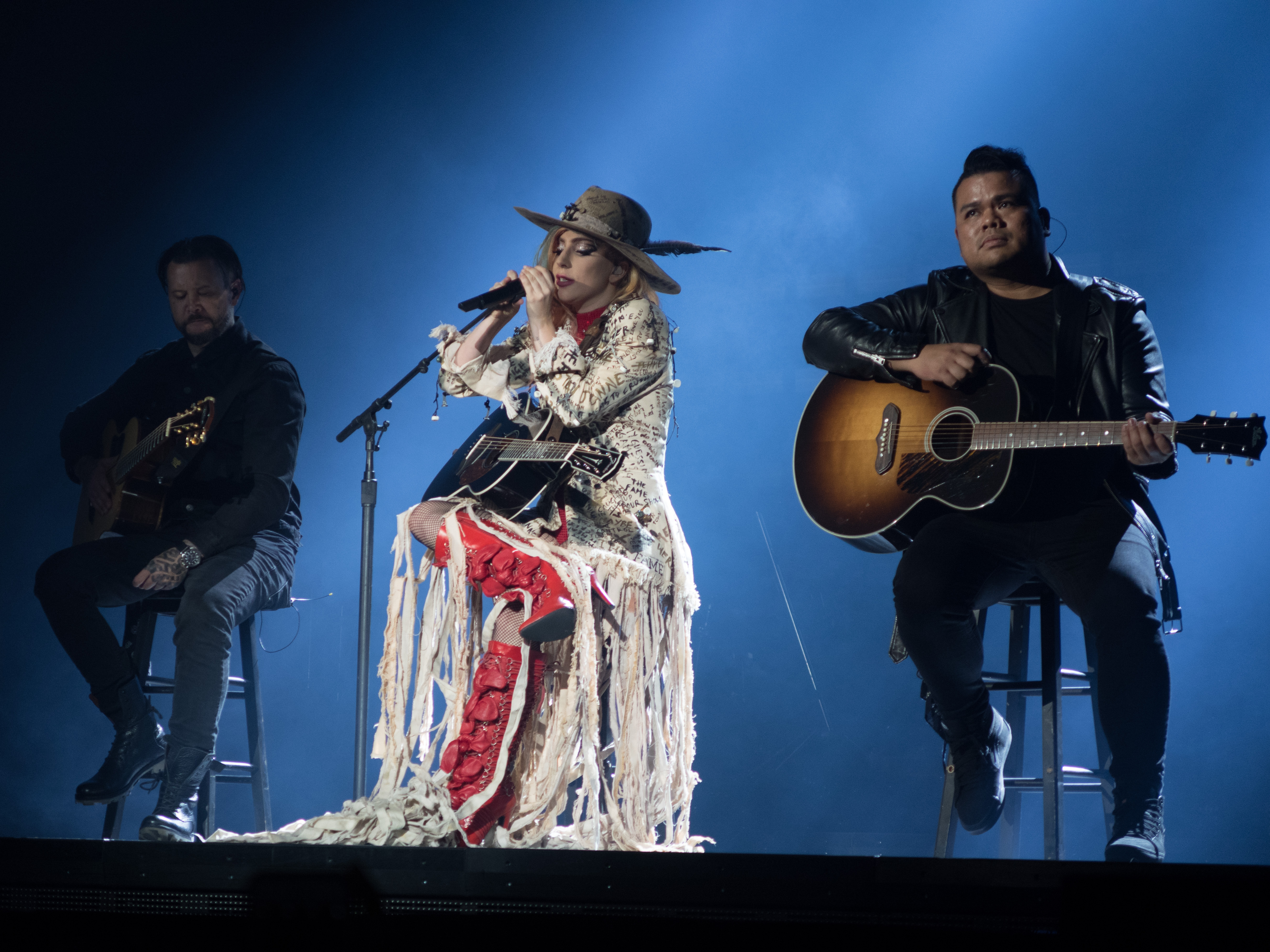
The performance of "Joanne" (pictured) was noted as an emotional highlight by some critics.

Jonathan Dean of The Times wrote that the show had a somewhat sombre tone, pointing to the emotional video interludes and personal stories about her family, adding that its sentimentality would likely resonate most strongly with Gaga's most devoted fans. Ed Potton from the same publication described the concert as occasionally "bitty" due to frequent costume-change interludes but praising many of the individual performances. He highlighted songs such as "Diamond Heart", "Applause", and "Joanne", and commended Gaga's vocal ability and energetic stage presence, concluding that she would be "far less compelling if she weren't so all over the place". Writing for i, Bernadette McNulty praised Gaga as "very much a vocalist par excellence", noting the "controlled and supple" quality of her live singing. However, she felt some newer songs from Joanne were "generic missteps" compared with Gaga's earlier hits.

The BBC's Will Gompertz was more critical, rating the show two out of five stars. He described the concert as disappointingly "ordinary" and suggesting that the physical intensity of Gaga's performance occasionally compromised her vocals. Gompertz further argued that the show abandoned much of the artistic experimentation associated with her earlier work, presenting instead a more conventional pop spectacle. Similarly, Kitty Empire of The Observer wrote that the tour's attempt to present the "real" Gaga sometimes diminished the theatrical artifice that had long defined her appeal. While she praised moments highlighting Gaga's vocals and emotional connection with fans, she felt the emphasis on sincerity and the stop-start pacing occasionally made the show feel unusually ordinary compared with her earlier performances.

== Broadcast and recording ==
On November 19, 2017, Gaga performed "The Cure" live for the American Music Awards, from the tour stop at Capital One Arena in Washington, D.C. This was the first televised performance of the song, and Gaga's second consecutive year performing at the American Music Awards. The same day prior to performing "LoveGame", the show was put on hold to broadcast a live screening of the American Music Awards presentation for Best Pop/Rock Female Artist which Gaga won. The award was presented by three fans and her acceptance speech was broadcast live from the tour.

The first Birmingham show was recorded for a planned project, though it ultimately remained unreleased for undisclosed reasons. An alternative cover artwork for Gaga's 2024 album Harlequin featured moments from her career in a dishevelled room setting, including a smashed VHS tape labeled "Joanne World Tour".

== Set list ==
This set list is from the August 1, 2017, concert in Vancouver. It is not intended to represent all concerts for the tour.

1. "Diamond Heart" (Note: The song was preceded by an intro, which contained elements of "Monster".)
2. "A-Yo"
3. "Poker Face"
4. "Perfect Illusion"
5. "John Wayne"
6. "Scheiße"
7. "Alejandro"
8. "Just Dance"
9. "LoveGame"
10. "Telephone"
11. "Applause"
12. "Come to Mama"
13. "The Edge of Glory"
14. "Born This Way"
15. "Bloody Mary"
16. "Dancin' in Circles"
17. "Paparazzi"
18. "Angel Down"
19. "Joanne"
20. "Bad Romance"
21. "The Cure"

Encore

22. "Million Reasons"

Notes

- "Bloody Mary", "Dancin' in Circles" and "Paparazzi" were omitted from select shows of the tour, including New York City and Chicago.
- During the performance in Houston, Gaga performed "Grigio Girls" as part of the encore.
- During the third Inglewood performance, Mark Ronson joined Gaga on stage to perform "Joanne".
- During the performance in Milan, Gaga performed an a cappella version of "Donatella" for Donatella Versace, who was attending the concert.

== Shows ==
List of concerts, showing date, city, country, venue, opening act, tickets sold, number of available tickets and amount of gross revenue
Date	City	Country	Venue	Opening act	Attendance	Revenue
August 1, 2017	Vancouver	Canada	Rogers Arena	—N/a	15,665 / 15,665	$1,430,667
August 3, 2017	Edmonton	Canada	Rogers Place	—N/a	15,002 / 15,002	$1,466,718
August 5, 2017	Tacoma	United States	Tacoma Dome	—N/a	19,296 / 19,296	$2,158,960
August 8, 2017	Inglewood (Note: Promoted as Los Angeles.)	United States	The Forum	—N/a	28,567 / 28,567	$3,633,410
August 9, 2017	Inglewood	United States	The Forum	—N/a	28,567 / 28,567	$3,633,410
August 11, 2017	Paradise (Note: Promoted as Las Vegas.)	United States	T-Mobile Arena	—N/a	15,893 / 15,893	$2,139,858
August 13, 2017	San Francisco	United States	AT&T Park	DJ White Shadow	39,225 / 39,225	$4,674,972
August 15, 2017	Sacramento	United States	Golden 1 Center	—N/a	15,546 / 15,546	$1,663,263
August 19, 2017	Omaha	United States	CenturyLink Center Omaha	—N/a	15,886 / 15,886	$1,693,038
August 21, 2017	Saint Paul	United States	Xcel Energy Center	—N/a	16,612 / 16,612	$1,813,406
August 23, 2017	Cleveland	United States	Quicken Loans Arena	—N/a	15,552 / 15,552	$1,622,428
August 25, 2017	Chicago	United States	Wrigley Field	DJ White Shadow	41,847 / 41,847	$5,213,820
August 28, 2017	Queens (Note: Promoted as New York City.)	United States	Citi Field	DJ White Shadow	69,978 / 69,978	$9,520,390
August 29, 2017	Queens	United States	Citi Field	DJ White Shadow	69,978 / 69,978	$9,520,390
September 1, 2017	Boston	United States	Fenway Park	DJ White Shadow	67,660 / 67,660	$8,111,672
September 2, 2017	Boston	United States	Fenway Park	DJ White Shadow	67,660 / 67,660	$8,111,672
September 6, 2017	Toronto	Canada	Air Canada Centre	—N/a	31,526 / 31,526	$3,328,841
September 7, 2017	Toronto	Canada	Air Canada Centre	—N/a	31,526 / 31,526	$3,328,841
September 10, 2017	Philadelphia	United States	Wells Fargo Center	—N/a	32,296 / 32,296	$3,629,942
September 11, 2017	Philadelphia	United States	Wells Fargo Center	—N/a	32,296 / 32,296	$3,629,942
November 3, 2017 (Note: Rescheduled from September 4, 2017, due to respiratory infection and laryngitis)	Montreal	Canada	Bell Centre	—N/a	17,946 / 17,946	$1,525,732
November 5, 2017	Indianapolis	United States	Bankers Life Fieldhouse	—N/a	15,375 / 15,375	$1,606,010
November 7, 2017	Detroit	United States	Little Caesars Arena	—N/a	15,550 / 15,550	$1,712,378
November 9, 2017	Uncasville	United States	Mohegan Sun Arena	—N/a	15,394 / 15,394	$1,784,100
November 11, 2017	Uncasville	United States	Mohegan Sun Arena	—N/a	15,394 / 15,394	$1,784,100
November 13, 2017	Louisville	United States	KFC Yum! Center	—N/a	17,997 / 17,997	$1,959,814
November 15, 2017	Kansas City	United States	Sprint Center	—N/a	15,117 / 15,117	$1,612,710
November 16, 2017	St. Louis	United States	Scottrade Center	—N/a	16,343 / 16,343	$1,577,704
November 19, 2017	Washington, D.C.	United States	Capital One Arena	—N/a	15,288 / 15,288	$1,901,754
November 20, 2017	Pittsburgh	United States	PPG Paints Arena	—N/a	15,228 / 15,228	$1,641,888
November 28, 2017	Atlanta	United States	Philips Arena	—N/a	12,155 / 12,155	$1,615,820
November 30, 2017	Miami	United States	American Airlines Arena	—N/a	14,738 / 14,738	$1,776,734
December 1, 2017	Tampa	United States	Amalie Arena	—N/a	15,170 / 15,170	$1,627,766
December 3, 2017	Houston	United States	Toyota Center	—N/a	13,100 / 13,100	$1,712,302
December 5, 2017	Austin	United States	Frank Erwin Center	—N/a	12,981 / 12,981	$1,437,660
December 8, 2017	Dallas	United States	American Airlines Center	—N/a	15,047 / 15,047	$1,771,939
December 9, 2017	Oklahoma City	United States	Chesapeake Energy Arena	—N/a	14,072 / 14,072	$1,512,444
December 12, 2017	Denver	United States	Pepsi Center	—N/a	15,852 / 15,852	$1,620,472
December 14, 2017	Salt Lake City	United States	Vivint Smart Home Arena	—N/a	12,688 / 12,688	$1,425,214
December 16, 2017	Paradise	United States	T-Mobile Arena	—N/a	14,478 / 14,478	$2,163,880
December 18, 2017	Inglewood	United States	The Forum	—N/a	13,282 / 13,282	$1,707,064
January 14, 2018 (Note: Rescheduled from September 21 and 22, 2017, due to hospitalization.)	Barcelona	Spain	Palau Sant Jordi	—N/a	28,918 / 28,918	$2,113,298
January 16, 2018	Barcelona	Spain	Palau Sant Jordi	—N/a	28,918 / 28,918	$2,113,298
January 18, 2018 (Note: Rescheduled from September 26, 2017, due to hospitalization.)	Assago (Note: Promoted as Milan.)	Italy	Mediolanum Forum	—N/a	11,170 / 11,170	$1,109,390
January 20, 2018 (Note: Rescheduled from October 3, 2017, due to hospitalization.)	Amsterdam	Netherlands	Ziggo Dome	—N/a	15,397 / 15,397	$1,465,089
January 22, 2018 (Note: Rescheduled from October 1, 2017, due to hospitalization.)	Antwerp	Belgium	Sportpaleis	—N/a	15,533 / 15,533	$1,435,452
January 24, 2018 (Note: Rescheduled from September 29, 2017, due to hospitalization.)	Hamburg	Germany	Barclaycard Arena	—N/a	10,587 / 10,587	$1,055,950
January 31, 2018 (Note: Rescheduled from October 15, 2017, due to hospitalization.)	Birmingham	England	Arena Birmingham	—N/a	12,456 / 12,456	$1,138,126
February 1, 2018 (Note: Rescheduled from October 17, 2017, due to hospitalization.)	Birmingham	England	Genting Arena	—N/a	9,522 / 9,522	$799,708
Total					841,935 / 841,935 (100%)	$94,911,783

== Cancelled shows ==
List of cancelled concerts, showing date, city, country, venue, and reason for cancellation
Date	City	Country	Venue	Reason
September 15, 2017 (Note: Intended to be part of Rock in Rio.)	Rio de Janeiro	Brazil	Barra Olympic Park	Hospitalization for body pain caused by fibromyalgia
February 4, 2018 (Note: Rescheduled from October 9 and 11, 2017, due to hospitalization.)	London	England	The O_{2} Arena	Body pain caused by fibromyalgia
February 6, 2018 (Note: Rescheduled from October 17, 2017, due to hospitalization.)	Manchester	England	Manchester Arena	Body pain caused by fibromyalgia
February 8, 2018	London	England	The O_{2} Arena	Body pain caused by fibromyalgia
February 11, 2018 (Note: Rescheduled from September 24, 2017, due to hospitalization.)	Zürich	Switzerland	Hallenstadion	Body pain caused by fibromyalgia
February 13, 2018 (Note: Rescheduled from October 28, 2017, due to hospitalization.)	Cologne	Germany	Lanxess Arena	Body pain caused by fibromyalgia
February 15, 2018 (Note: Rescheduled from October 23, 2017, due to hospitalization.)	Stockholm	Sweden	Ericsson Globe	Body pain caused by fibromyalgia
February 17, 2018 (Note: Rescheduled from October 21, 2017, due to hospitalization.)	Copenhagen	Denmark	Royal Arena	Body pain caused by fibromyalgia
February 20, 2018 (Note: Rescheduled from October 6 and 7, 2017, due to hospitalization.)	Paris	France	AccorHotels Arena	Body pain caused by fibromyalgia
February 21, 2018	Paris	France	AccorHotels Arena	Body pain caused by fibromyalgia
February 23, 2018 (Note: Rescheduled from October 26, 2017, due to hospitalization.)	Berlin	Germany	Mercedes-Benz Arena	Body pain caused by fibromyalgia
