= Applause (Lady Gaga song) =

Single by Lady Gaga

from the album Artpop
- Released: August 12, 2013
- Studio: Record Plant (Hollywood); Platinum Sound (New York City)
- Genre: Electropop; dance-pop; Eurodance
- Length: 3:32
- Label: Streamline; Interscope
- Songwriters: Lady Gaga; Paul "DJ White Shadow" Blair; Dino Zisis; Nick Monson; Martin Bresso; Nicolas Mercier; Julien Arias; William Grigahcine
- Producers: Paul "DJ White Shadow" Blair; Lady Gaga

Lady Gaga singles chronology
"Marry the Night" (2011)	"Applause" (2013)	"Do What U Want" (2013)

Music video
- "Applause" on YouTube

"Applause" is a song by American singer Lady Gaga from her third studio album, Artpop (2013). It was released as the album's lead single through Interscope Records on August 12, 2013. Written and produced by Gaga, DJ White Shadow, Dino Zisis, and Nick Monson, additional songwriters included Martin Bresso, Nicolas Mercier, Julien Arias and William Grigahcine. "Applause" was inspired by the cheering of her fans, which kept her motivated during the months she toured with the Born This Way Ball in pain, before cancelling it due to a hip injury, and pays respect to the art of performance. It is an electropop, dance-pop and Eurodance song built around synthesizers and hi-NRG beats, with lyrics addressing how Gaga is dependent upon her fans' adoration and how she lives to perform.

The song received positive reviews for its catchy chorus, likened to Gaga's debut album, The Fame (2008). "Applause" topped charts in Greece, Hungary, Lebanon, and Spain and reached the top 10 in numerous countries. It was certified multi-platinum in Canada, Sweden, and the U.S.

An accompanying music video directed by fashion photography duo Inez and Vinoodh was released on August 19, 2013, and broadcast on jumbotrons across Times Square. The video received positive reviews from critics, who saw it as a profile of Gaga herself and noted references to German Expressionist cinema and Andy Warhol. To promote the record, Gaga opened the 2013 MTV Video Music Awards with a performance of the song in which she represented her career through several on-stage wardrobe changes. She also performed it live on Good Morning America, Saturday Night Live, and many of her tours and residencies.

== Background and writing ==
Development of Artpop began shortly after the release of Born This Way (2011), and by the following year, the album's concepts started building as Gaga collaborated with producers Fernando Garibay and DJ White Shadow. Initial recording sessions for Artpop coincided with the Born This Way Ball: up to fifty songs were written and considered for inclusion. Gaga herself admitted that she intended to make audiences have "a really good time" with Artpop, engineering the album to mirror "a night at the club".

A hip surgery in February 2013 caused the singer to take a six-month hiatus, during which she studied literature and music with her creative team, the Haus of Gaga. It also allowed her to review and enhance her musical direction, which she described as a meticulous "gazing process". "Applause" was written and produced by Gaga and DJ White Shadow, along with Nick Monson and Dino Zisis while on the road for her Born This Way Ball tour in 2012. Other songwriters working on the track included Martin Bresso, Nicolas Mercier, Julien Arias and William Grigahcine. Talking to Sirius XM Radio, Gaga explained the inspiration behind the songwriting of "Applause":

"I realized it was the applause of the fans that really kept me going. Because I would be ready to go onstage and just be crying hysterically not understanding even how I was feeling. I was feeling very dizzy, I had a lot of vertigo, I had pain but it's like fuck if I know what hurts the most because I'd been on tour for a year. But I didn't want to let them down and I just couldn't cancel because the thought of leaving 50,000 kids in the arena just broke my heart. So I went out every night and I played and I played and I played until I couldn't walk one night."

== Recording and composition ==
"Applause" (2013)
A 21-second sample of the song's chorus, which features Gaga's vocal acrobatics and EDM influences.

Recording sessions for the song took place at Record Plant Studios, Hollywood, California, and Platinum Sound Recording Studio, New York City by Dave Russell, with Benjamin Rice and Andrew Robertson working as assistants. Russell also did the mixing of the track at Record Plant and at Heard It! Studios. Additional mixing was carried out by Bill Malina, with assistance from Rice and Ghazi Hourani. Rick Pearl performed the additional programming and Gene Grimaldi completed the audio mastering at Oasis Mastering Studios in Burbank, California.

"Applause" is set in the time signature of common time and has a tempo of 140 beats per minute. It is composed in the key of G minor, following the chord progression of Gm–F–E♭–Cm–F–Gm, with Gaga's vocals spanning from F_{3} to A_{5}. The record has been pinned to the electropop, dance-pop and Eurodance music genres, and has been cited as returning Gaga to her career roots by mirroring the sounds of her debut album. Evan Sawdey of PopMatters described it as "closer to 'Just Dance' in style over any of her Born This Way-era hits, but in a much more aggressive fashion, catering to the gradual EDM-stranglehold of pop radio." Erin Coulehan of Rolling Stone concurred, calling it "a throwback to 'LoveGame'-era Gaga".

The song's production is primarily centered around hi-NRG beats, "stuttering synthesizers", and hard snares. Mikael Wood of the Los Angeles Times observed that the song's "sleek Euro-house vibe" recalled Gaga's early hits, including "Poker Face" and "Bad Romance". The Guardian's Michael Cragg described the song's composition as "brilliantly camp – all squelchy synths and juddering beats" and likened it to a "ridiculous glam-rock song given a techno makeover". The chorus has been noted to contain "a solid mixture of EDM-influenced pop, glitchy k-pop-lite euphoria and just a twinkle of that original joy of The Fame" and features Gaga singing the lines, "Give me that thing that I love / Put your hands up, make 'em touch". Her vocal acrobatics during the song's verses have been compared to those of David Bowie, Annie Lennox, and Grace Jones.

Lyrically, "Applause" is about how Gaga is dependent upon her fan's adoration, and "what it means to live your life as a canvas", while also serving as "a kiss-off to critics". Bradley Stern of MuuMuse opined that "Unlike 'Born This Way', 'Applause' is about celebrating no one but Mother Monster herself". According to Gaga, the song addresses the distinction between being an artist and a celebrity. She elaborated, "I live for the applause but I don't live for the attention in the way that people just love you because you're famous. I live for actually performing for people and then them applauding because they've been entertained."

== Artwork and release ==
During the process of picking the lead single from Artpop, Gaga played numerous songs for Jimmy Iovine, an executive at Interscope Records. Of the 40 songs she played for Iovine, he preferred "Applause", the last song played. Gaga revealed that "Applause" was almost excluded from the final cut of Artpop, due to an abundance of recorded material, until the meeting with Iovine. Gaga confirmed "Applause" as the upcoming single, and announced that it would be released on August 19, 2013. The official artwork for "Applause" was debuted on Women's Wear Daily's website on July 29, 2013. The cover features Gaga's face smeared with multi-colored paint and surrounded by a white sheet. Gaga explained that she chose the smeared makeup look for the cover to symbolize the moment at the end of a show when the performer is vulnerable and longing for the audience's approval. The artwork was compared to the cover of David Bowie's 1980 album Scary Monsters (And Super Creeps).

The single's cover artwork was compared to the cover of David Bowie's 1980 album Scary Monsters (And Super Creeps).

On August 10, 2013, snippets of the song began leaking online. Gaga urged fans to "please take these down as much as possible" and provided instructions on how to report information regarding the unauthorized distribution of her song to her label's parent company, Universal Music Group. In response, fans reported websites seen distributing or linking to the snippets of the single, with nearly 2,500 individuals sending a singular link to Universal's takedown page. However, despite such efforts, a leak was imminent, so Gaga released the song a week early onto various radio stations across America. The single was made available in most countries just before midnight (EST) on the iTunes Store, coupled with a pre-order of Artpop. Following day, Gaga was seen in goth costume with clown-like face paint similar to the "Applause" artwork, at various promotional events. The Huffington Post compared the style-shift to Marilyn Manson, saying: "With her black hair slicked back, a face full of white powder and her black blazer and shirt combo, Gaga could have easily been mistaken for Manson if it wasn't for her towering heels." Gaga also premiered a short clip of "Applause" that quoted harsh journalism that attacked her credibility as an artist. In the video, Gaga was seen sitting naked in a white room and wearing a transparent visor. The sound of an audience booing and jeering was heard in the background. Direct quotations from critics and detractors appeared at the bottom of the video, which included "Lady Gaga is over" and "Do not buy Lady Gaga's new single 'Applause'". The clip was construed as an attempt at reverse psychology.

Due to the proximity of the single's leak to fellow pop singer Katy Perry's "Roar", "Applause" was fervently compared to it, in addition to rumors spreading of a "feud" between the two. Gaga received negative press after news arose of her attempting to artificially increase the single's placement on the Billboard Hot 100 chart, which some sources reported as an attempt to beat the sales of "Roar". She was criticized for tweeting fans and encouraging them to purchase numerous copies of the single, with the chance to meet the singer in London offered as an incentive. Gaga also shared a link to a playlist that played the "Applause" music video 150 times consecutively, prompting criticism from Billboard editorial director Bill Werde, who argued that the practice was "not in the spirit of what we chart". Following this, Gaga stated that she would be rewarding the fans with the most creative ideas, and not those who purchased the most copies of "Applause".

== Critical reception ==
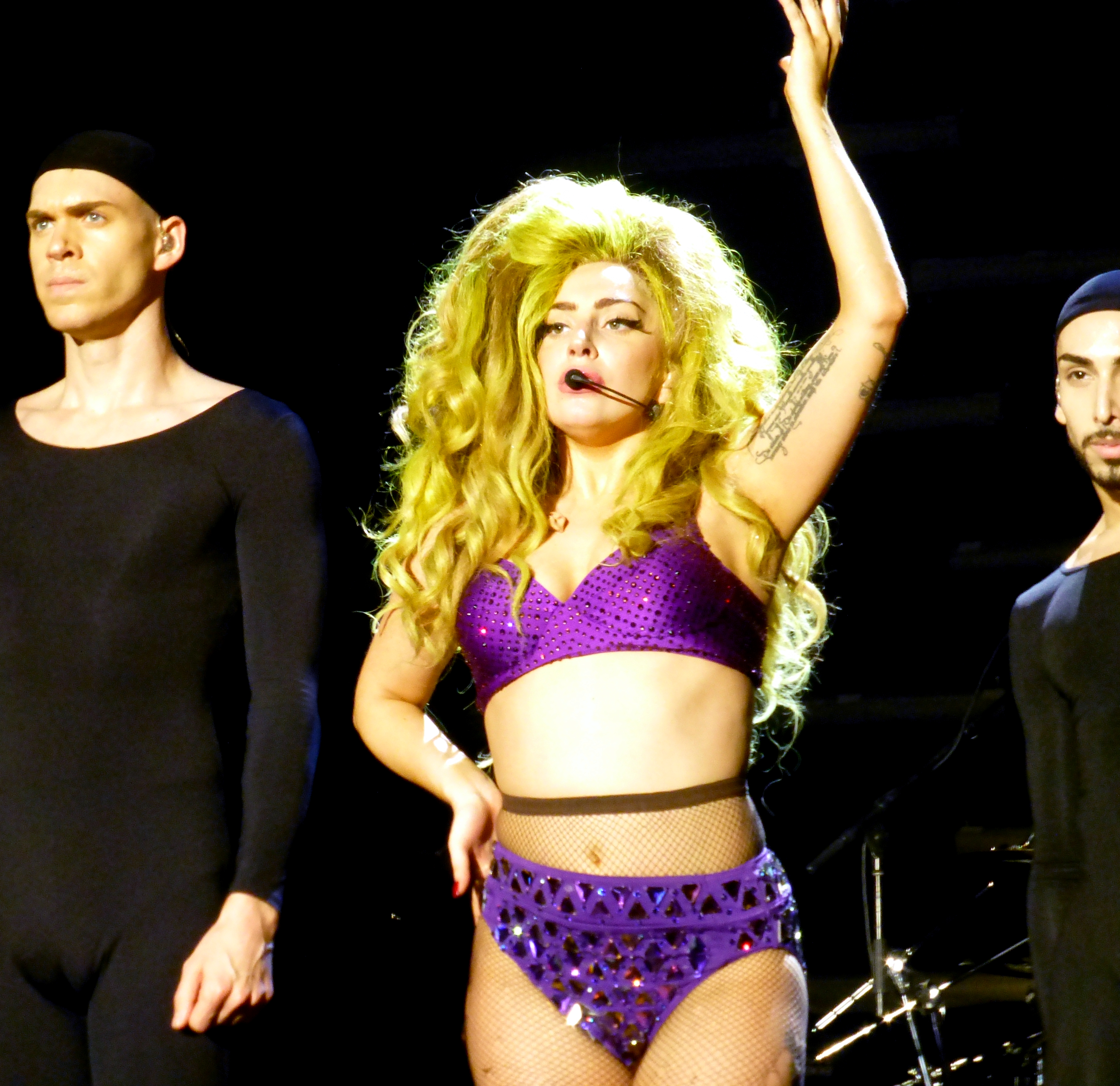
Gaga performing "Applause" during her residency show at Roseland Ballroom (2014)

"Applause" received favorable reviews from music critics. Chris Richards of The Washington Post wrote, "It's good. Maybe even slow clap good. Because while so many (too many!) of Gaga's songs have been designed to boost the esteem of her flock, this song finds her openly pining for the mass-adulation that all superstars need to survive." Jason Lipshutz of Billboard lauded the song's hook and remarked, "As always, Gaga has turned a lofty idea into a jingle for the masses." The Guardian's Michael Cragg felt "it houses one of her most uplifting choruses, with Gaga sounding delirious throughout." Lewis Corner from Digital Spy gave the song four out of five stars, stating that "Lady Gaga makes no secret that she's after mass adoration, and as far as lead singles go, her next grand spectacle is off to a strong start." The Huffington Post writer Baggers described it as "pop at its best: instant, euphoric, joyful and impossible to get out of your head".

Bradley Stern of MuuMuse gave the song a positive review and concluded, "Is it a solid start? I'd say so. On par with 'Bad Romance'? Well, let's not get ahead of ourselves." Sal Cinquemani of Slant Magazine believed the song lacked "the bigness" of Gaga's previous lead singles but noted that "it proves she can still craft a catchy hook". Mof Gimmers of The Quietus noted that the song was "a bit sticky in places" but explained "if you stop expecting too much of Gaga, you'll realise it has a furiously irresistible chorus." Kevin Fallon of The Daily Beast was critical of the song's "disjointed verses" but noted that they were "increasingly forgivable every time the song's unshakable chorus blasts" and praised it as a fitting climax to the album. Melinda Newman of Hitfix gave the song a B+ rating and labelled it "a layered, dance twirler". Positive feedback also came from Mike Driver from Clash who highlighted "Applause" as one of the tracks on Artpop that ticks "all of the prerequisite Gaga boxes – dazzling production, a clutch of clever couplets, choruses you can demolish a tower block with", but found that it did not represent a notable musical progression for the singer. Hilary Hughes from Esquire offered similar commentary, feeling that Gaga was playing it safe and that "the song doesn't break new ground for the reigning Queen of Pop".

In a mixed review, Evan Sawdey of PopMatters called the song generic and that "were it not for her heady lyrics and warped lead-in synth line, 'Applause' wouldn't stand out all that much in radio, which makes it an even more curious choice as a lead single." Spin's Marc Hogan criticized the song's "bland dance-bot foundations" as "a bit behind the times at a pop moment where the biggest song-of-the-summer candidates have moved back toward '70s-inflected guitars." Another mixed review came from Harry Hawcroft of Contactmusic.com, who wrote "I can't give it more than a polite clap."

== Chart performance ==
In the United States, "Applause" did not enter the Billboard Hot 100 in its first week. It also ranked below the top 75 threshold of the US Radio Songs chart, with 16 million audience impressions across 210 stations, with the track officially impacting radio stations on August 19, 2013. "Applause" reached number one on the Dance/Electronic Songs chart, and entered the US Pop Songs Chart at number 20; the highest debut on that chart, by a solo female artist in 2013. The following week, "Applause" debuted at number six on the Billboard Hot 100. Following its radio and retail release the track charted on Digital Songs at number three, Streaming Songs at number nine and Radio Songs at number forty.

On its second week on the Hot 100, the song climbed to number four while reaching number three on Streaming Songs (due the release of the music video), and number thirty-five on Radio Songs, and falling to number five on Digital Songs with sales of 163,000. In its sixth week, the song sold 160,000 copies and reached sales of 1 million copies, becoming her eleventh song to do so. In the same week, it rose to number nine on the Radio Songs chart, becoming her tenth single to reach the top-ten there. It managed to stay in the top-ten of the Billboard Hot 100 for 14 consecutive weeks. As of February 2018, the song had sold 2.7 million copies in the United States, and has been certified 4× Platinum by the Recording Industry Association of America (RIAA) for sales of 4 million equivalent-units in the country.

According to the Official Charts Company, "Applause" sold over 10,000 copies within a few hours in the UK. It debuted and peaked at number five on the UK Singles Chart, making it her highest-charting single since "Born This Way" (2011). "Applause" sold 38,042 copies by the end of the first week, and dropped to number nine on its second week. It was present for a total of 20 weeks within the top-100 of the chart. The British Phonographic Industry (BPI) certified it Platinum, and it has sold 530,000 copies as of April 2021. In Europe, Oceania and elsewhere, the song received a huge commercial acclaim, peaking atop in Hungary, Greece, Lebanon and Spain, top five in France, where Gaga achevied her seventh top five and her highest-charting song since "Born This Way" and "Bad Romance" in 2010 and 2011, in Belgium's Wallonia, where she achieved her first top five since "The Edge Of Glory" and "Born This Way", Bulgaria, Finland, Germany and Italy, top ten in Poland, Norway, Denmark, New Zealand and Japan and top twenty in Sweden, Slovakia, the Netherlands, Australia and Slovenia.

== Music video ==
=== Development ===
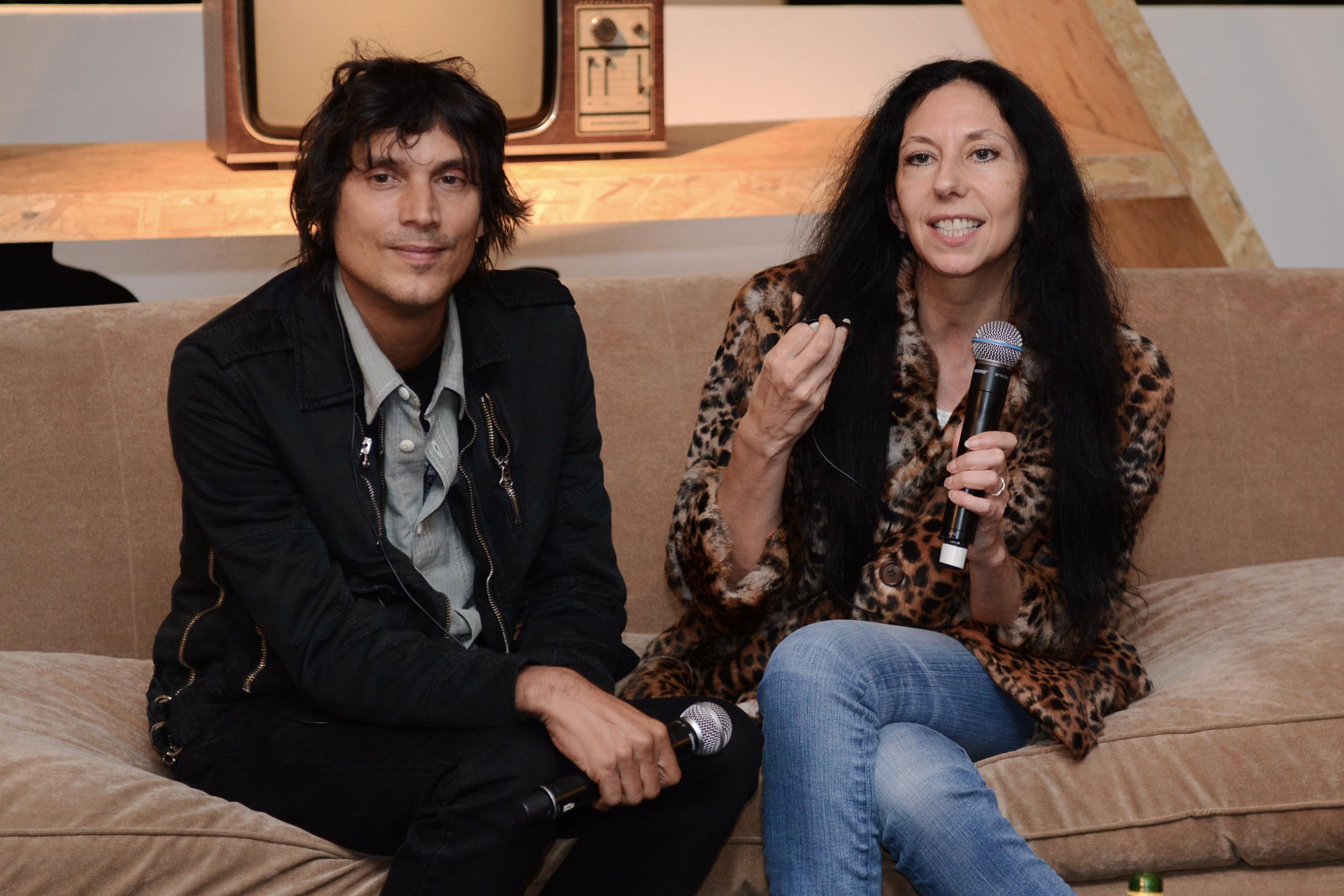
Inez and Vinoodh, directors of the music video

The music video for "Applause" was directed by fashion photography duo Inez and Vinoodh, who had previously collaborated with Gaga on a series of fashion films in 2011 and a photoshoot for V magazine. The video was filmed at Paramount Pictures studio in Hollywood, California on two different sets over the course of 3 days during the week of July 15, 2013. Gaga was inspired by silent film and early horror films and explained that the concept behind the video is that of her passion for shape-shifting and transforming. She described it as "Iconography in motion, as magic." Gaga and her team decided to use several different looks for the video, with each being representative of different facets of her as a performer. Attires worn in the video included designs by Gareth Pugh, vintage John Galliano, as well as outfits crafted by the Haus of Gaga.

Inez and Vinoodh explained that the video symbolizes "this idea that she goes through this struggle to go back onstage, which is in that pink laser tower. And she's sort of dragging that leg as a trophy and making it back on stage as a fully-realized, complete new person". Jo Ratcliffe, a London-based illustrator known for her hand-drawn graphic design, was hired to provide animation effects for the video. She described Gaga as "really tough" during filming and added that she had "never seen anyone push themselves so hard."

=== Release and synopsis ===
Prior to the release of the music video, Gaga debuted a lyric video for the song. The lyrics were displayed over footage shot by Gaga at the drag nightclub Micky's in Los Angeles, California. Drag queens Raven, Detox Icunt, Courtney Act, Morgan McMichaels, Shangela, and Shannel all performed in the video. On August 19, 2013, Gaga announced that she would be debuting the music video for "Applause" and filming a live interview on ABC's morning television show Good Morning America later that day. The singer arrived at the Times Square Studios in New York City, where the show is filmed, wearing a dress made entirely out of paper. The video premiered on the show after Gaga's live interview and was broadcast on jumbotrons across Times Square in Midtown Manhattan simultaneously.

The video itself includes shots taken in both color and black-and-white. It drew heavy inspiration from the arts and featured references to Sandro Botticelli's The Birth of Venus and Andy Warhol's Marilyn Diptych. The video included artistic and complex scenes such as Gaga's head on a swan, a scene in a bird cage, and the singer seated in a large top hat, as well as more simplistic scenes including Gaga walking in a black outfit wearing a headscarf, and the singer dancing with a white cloth in bright make-up, in a scene similar to the cover art of the single. Throughout the video, bursts of color are shown theatrically. As Gaga sings the line "One second I'm a Koons then suddenly the Koons is me", she is transformed into a black swan/human hybrid. Gaga also wears hand-shaped lingerie and a seashell bra with matching shell decoration. Near the climax, the singer features in a violet, crystal-like scene, holding a silver, leg-shaped bouquet of colorful flowers. The final chorus concludes in flashing images from various scenes of the video. Then at the end of the video, Artpop is spelled using hand gestures.

=== Reception and analysis ===
A scene from the music video for "Applause", showing Gaga's head superimposed on a swan's neck. Chris Rovzar of Vanity Fair compared the scenes to a photo shoot Gaga did for Interview magazine.

The video received generally positive reviews. Glenn Gamboa of Newsday described it as a barrage of artistic images that continued the song's theme of combining art with pop culture. Erin Coulehan of Rolling Stone magazine noted that the video was in "typical Gaga fashion", further calling it a spectacle of flashing lights, vivid colors and intricate choreography. Kyle Anderson of Entertainment Weekly also echoed Coulehan's statements about the video being in Gaga fashion, adding that it "makes the song sound infinitely better... It doesn't quite hit the high notes of 'Paparazzi' or 'Bad Romance', but it's definitely a step up from the middling clips from the Born This Way era." A writer of Billboard described the video as "a collection of arty postures and scenarios" and compared the black-glove bra look to Janet Jackson's 1993 Rolling Stone magazine cover. Randall Roberts of Los Angeles Times saw the video as "basically like 20 different Vogue shoots documented and spliced. There is no plot other than the basic lyrical premise, "I need you to pay more attention to me," given heft by a syllabically rocky first-person observation about pop culture, fame and art that Andy Warhol noted 50 years ago." Chiderah Monde of New York Daily News described the video as "a straight-forward profile of the artist herself."

A writer of Rolling Stone compared the black-and-white look of the video with Madonna's "Vogue", 1920s German Expressionist cinema and Ingmar Bergman's The Seventh Seal. He further noted influences from Liza Minnelli, and the video for Tom Petty and the Heartbreakers' "Don't Come Around Here No More". A writer of The Independent wrote, "Showing Gaga in a number of guises (as a Beatnik performance artist, her face smeared with clown make-up, sporting David Bowie-esque androgyny while wearing a bra made of black, leather gloves and as various winged creatures), the high energy accompaniment to her new track is a hotch-potch of imagery that seems to highlight the pop princess' ever changing appearance." Chris Rovzar of Vanity Fair described the video as a moving photo shoot for Interview magazine "except with more sanity". Rovzar concluded that it also featured "the standard Gaga nonsense" and praised Gaga's smile during several scenes of the video as a highlight. James Montgomery of MTV News saw the video as Gaga "pulling the curtain back on her creative process, showing the viewer how she's willing to do anything to please the public." Melinda Newman of Hitfix felt Gaga "continues her one-woman performance art with the very theatrical video" and interpreted it as showing that "there is nothing Lady Gaga won’t do to get your attention".

Conversely, Spin's Marc Hogan wrote, "'Some of us just like to read', she sings, and hey, that includes us. But it's easier to clap for something that moves or touches you, rather than serves as an advertisement for Gaga as incomprehensible high-end brand." Consequence of Sound wrote in their review, "Gaga's head appears on a black swan and she boogies down in a clam bikini. If this doesn't bump up her sales, I no longer believe in art." Hilary Hughes of Esquire said that the video "hits all the marks of Gaga-esque eccentricity: glitter, boob grabs, weird animals, space, severed limbs, devotional imagery, nudity, neon, etc. It just doesn't redefine those marks, as previous music videos of Gaga's — namely "Bad Romance," "Paparazzi" and "Judas" — have". Spencer Kornhaber of The Atlantic believed that Gaga was parodying herself with the video and suggested that her aim was "to make a video both celebrating and poking fun at her career thus far." However, he considered it forgettable when compared to Gaga's previous efforts. At the 2014 MTV Video Music Awards Japan the music video won Best Pop Video.

== Live performances and other appearances ==
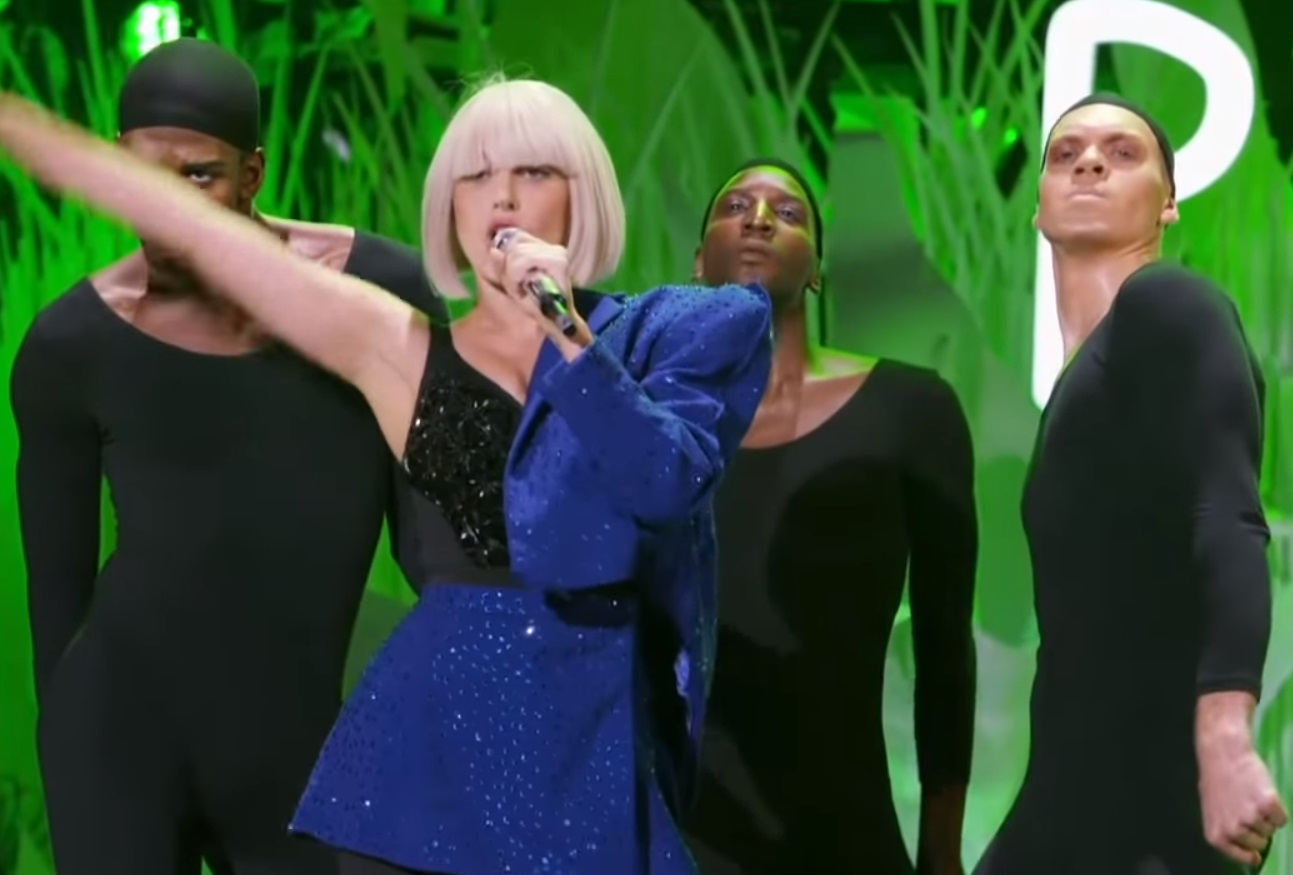
Gaga performing "Applause" at the 2013 MTV Video Music Awards, where she portrayed looks from her previous eras

"Applause" was performed live for the first time at the 2013 MTV Video Music Awards. Gaga began the performance wearing a square-shaped head piece and an all-white cape as pre-recorded boos were quickly replaced by sound of cheers. Gaga then glided across the stage and was assisted by her dancers as she changed into a black sequin leotard and performed the intricate choreography seen in the song's corresponding music video. Throughout the performance she cycled through costumes and wigs she had previously employed throughout her career. She danced with a Jeff Koons blue gazing ball, and had her face painted in the style of the single cover by one of her dancers. Gaga concluded the performance by emerging from behind jungle-like scenery dressed in a seashell bikini, big blonde curly wig and took a bow. The singer collaborated with theater director Robert Wilson on the performance. His designed set featured a shimmering white jungle background with letters spelling "Applause" suspended from tree branches. Gaga relegated the performance as a "metaphor" for herself and felt it was "the most physically challenging performance I've done, ever".

"Applause" was the final song Gaga performed at London's Roundhouse as part of a show that was broadcast live online on September 1, 2013, for the month-long iTunes Festival. Gaga completed her last look of the show with "a green ringmaster jacket, top hat and sparkly silver boots" and performed the song alongside "an endless supply of supple dancers in gothy fetish wear" who danced behind her on chairs. On September 9, 2013, Gaga performed the song on Good Morning America and appeared dressed as multiple characters from The Wizard of Oz. "Applause" served as the encore during the singer's Artpop launch party event, dubbed the ArtRave, held in the Brooklyn Navy Yard in New York during the early hours of November 11, 2013. The singer was the host of the November 16, 2013 episode of Saturday Night Live, where she opened the program with a Chicago-style performance of "Applause", which subsequently morphed into a rendition of "New York, New York". Later that month, Gaga also performed the song on the television special Lady Gaga and the Muppets Holiday Spectacular as both a solo and a reprise with The Muppets. The following December, she performed the song at the Jingle Bell Ball.

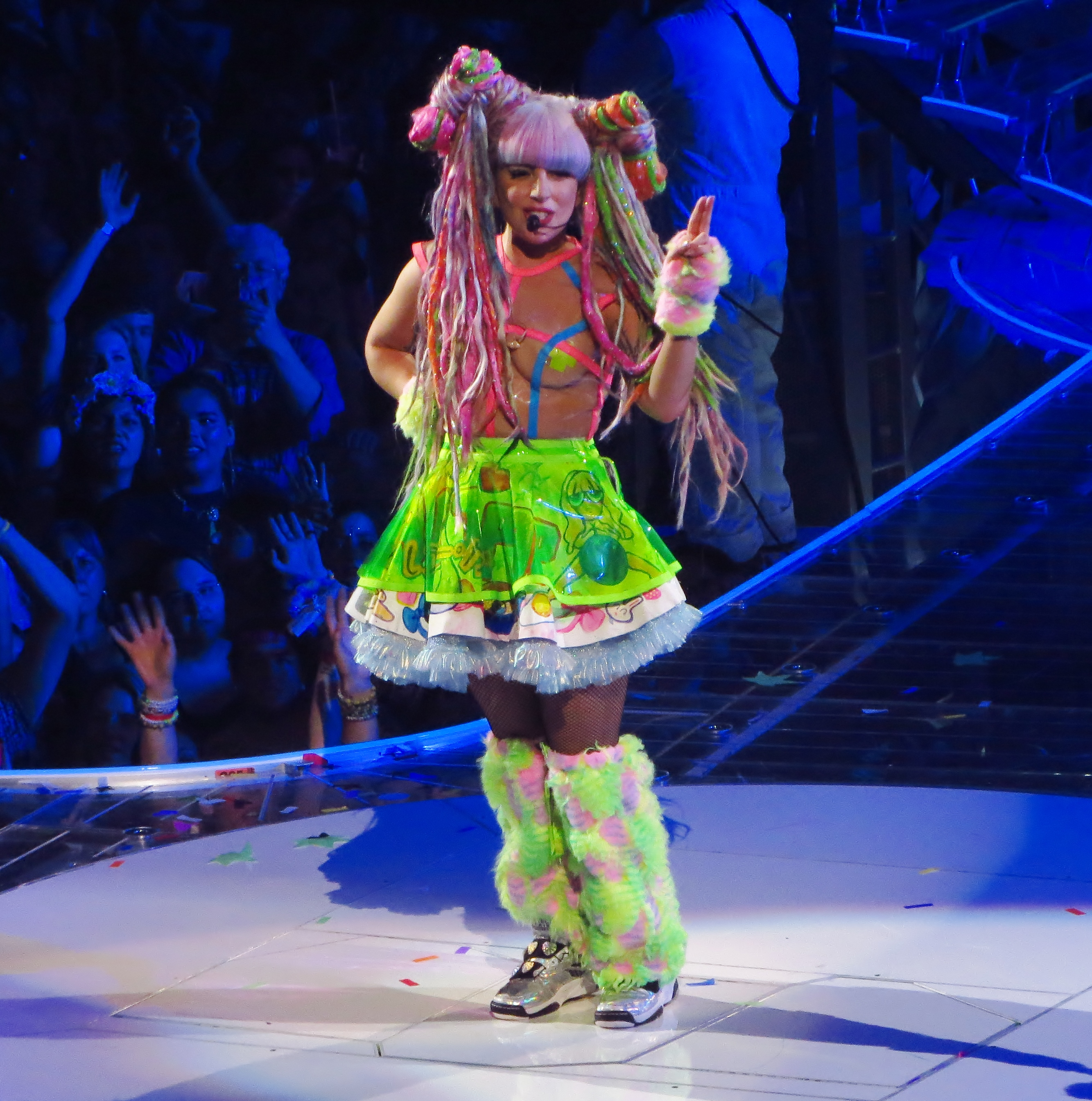
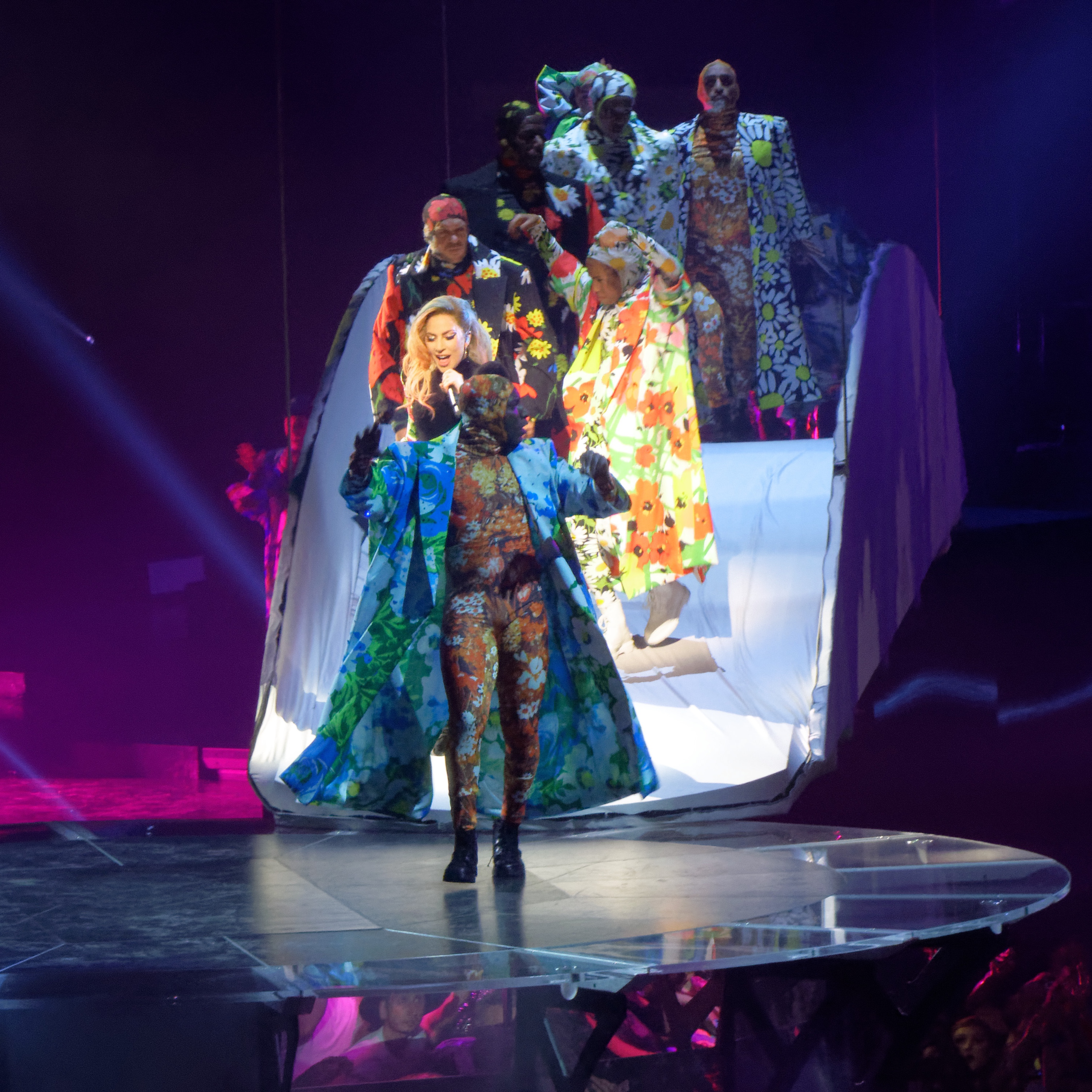
Gaga performing "Applause" during 2014's ArtRave: The Artpop Ball (top) and at the Joanne World Tour in 2017 (bottom)

Gaga reprised "Applause" at the South by Southwest (SXSW) music festival in Austin, Texas in March 2014, where she was joined onstage by her opening acts and friends, the Dirty Pearls, Semi Precious Weapons and Lady Starlight. "Applause" was later included in the setlist of Gaga's Manhattan residency show at Roseland Ballroom. Gaga appeared in a purple sequin studded two-piece with a matching face-mask and green colored wig during the performance. The song was included on the set list of her ArtRave: The Artpop Ball tour. Following "Bad Romance", Gaga joined her dancers on the catwalks, where she performed a choreographed dance routine in a rave inspired outfit. Brad Wheeler of The Globe and Mail described Gaga's performance as "unstoppable and enthralling" but criticized the show's production for drowning out Gaga's vocals and said: "She’s not like Jennifer Lopez or Britney Spears or even Madonna, who were raised as dancers and lime-lighters, not musicians. And yet, she prefers to perform spectacles that, by design, fail to showcase all of her abilities."

In 2017, Gaga used the song at her Coachella set for a video interlude before the encore. While changing into her final outfit, the whole song was played as the lyrics appeared on big screens. The song was later also added to her Joanne World Tour (2017–2018) setlist. During the show, three catwalks were suspended high above the floor, which were lowered for the performance of "Applause", allowing Gaga and her dancers to cross between three smaller b-stages on the floor while performing the song. Gaga wore a black bodysuit with rose embellished sleeves, while her dancers were dressed in flower-patterned kimono robes. Gaga has also performed the song on her 2018–2020 Las Vegas residency show, Enigma, and the 2025–2026 tour, The Mayhem Ball.

In 2016, "Applause" was featured in the "lipsync for your life" segment on the season premiere of RuPaul's Drag Race's eighth season. The track was included in the pre-show playlist for Taylor Swift's Eras Tour (2023–2024), played shortly before she came on stage.

== Track listings and formats ==
Remixes EP

1. "Applause" (Empire of the Sun Remix) – 4:08
2. "Applause" (Viceroy Remix) – 4:27
3. "Applause" (Purity Ring Remix) – 3:04
4. "Applause" (Bent Collective Club Mix) – 7:26
5. "Applause" (DJ White Shadow Electrotech Remix) – 5:49
6. "Applause" (Fareoh Remix) – 4:52
7. "Applause" (DJ White Shadow Trap Remix) – 4:09
8. "Applause" (Goldhouse Remix) – 4:34

Digital download / streaming

1. "Applause" – 3:32

CD single

1. "Applause" – 3:32
2. "Applause" (Instrumental) – 3:32

== Credits and personnel ==
=== Recording ===
- Recorded at Record Plant Studios, Hollywood, California and Platinum Sound Recording Studio, New York City, New York
- Mastered at Oasis Mastering Studios, Burbank, California

=== Publishing ===
- Stefani Germanotta P/K/A Lady Gaga (BMI) Sony ATV Songs LLC/House of Gaga Publishing, LLC/GloJoe Music Inc. (BMI), Maxwell and Carter Publishing, LLC (ASCAP), administered by Universal Music Publishing Group and Maxwell and Carter Publishing, LLC (BMI) administered by Universal Music Publishing Group, Etrange Fruit (SACEM), Mercer Music (SACEM), Guess Publishing (SACEM), Fuzion (SACEM) Administered by Get Familiar Music (ASCAP)

=== Personnel ===
- Lady Gaga – songwriter, vocals, producer
- Paul "DJ White Shadow" Blair – songwriter, producer
- Dino Zisis – songwriter, producer
- Nick Monson – songwriter, producer
- Martin Bresso – songwriter
- Nicolas Mercier – songwriter
- Julius Arias – songwriter
- William Grigahcine – songwriter
- Dave Russell – recording, mixing
- Benjamin Rice – recording and mixing assistant
- Andrew Robertson – recording assistant
- Bill Malina – additional mixing
- Ghazi Hourani – mixing assistant
- Rick Pearl – additional programming
- Gene Grimaldi – mastering

== Charts ==
=== Weekly charts ===
Weekly chart performance for "Applause"
Chart (2013–2014)	Peak position
Australia (ARIA)	11
Australia Dance (ARIA)	2
Austria (Ö3 Austria Top 40)	6
Belgium (Ultratop 50 Flanders)	10
Belgium (Ultratop 50 Wallonia)	5
Brazil (Billboard Brasil Hot 100)	53
Brazil Hot Pop Songs	16
Bulgaria Airplay (BAMP)	3
Canada Hot 100 (Billboard)	4
Canada AC (Billboard)	43
Canada CHR/Top 40 (Billboard)	7
Canada Hot AC (Billboard)	8
CIS Airplay (TopHit)	27
Croatia International Airplay (Top lista)	2
Czech Republic Airplay (ČNS IFPI)	12
Denmark (Tracklisten)	6
Finland (Suomen virallinen lista)	4
France (SNEP)	3
Germany (GfK)	5
Greece Digital Songs (Billboard)	1
Hungary (Dance Top 40)	29
Hungary (Rádiós Top 40)	2
Hungary (Single Top 40)	1
Ireland (IRMA)	9
Israel (Media Forest)	7
Italy Airplay (EarOne)	10
Italy (FIMI)	2
Japan Hot 100 (Billboard)	6
Lebanon (Lebanese Top 20)	1
Luxembourg Digital Songs (Billboard)	3
Mexico (Billboard Mexican Airplay)	5
Mexico Anglo (Monitor Latino)	7
Netherlands (Dutch Top 40)	13
Netherlands (Single Top 100)	15
New Zealand (Recorded Music NZ)	7
Norway (VG-lista)	8
Poland Airplay (ZPAV)	7
Portugal Digital Songs (Billboard)	8
Russia Airplay (TopHit)	27
Scottish Singles Sales (Official Charts)	5
Slovakia Airplay (ČNS IFPI)	18
Slovenia (SloTop50)	13
South Korea (Circle)	55
South Korea Foreign (Circle)	1
Spain (Promusicae)	1
Sweden (Sverigetopplistan)	17
Switzerland (Schweizer Hitparade)	7
UK Singles (Official Charts)	5
Ukraine Airplay (TopHit)	64
US Billboard Hot 100	4
US Adult Contemporary (Billboard)	24
US Adult Pop Airplay (Billboard)	8
US Dance Club Songs (Billboard)	1
US Hot Dance/Electronic Songs (Billboard)	1
US Pop Airplay (Billboard)	4
US Rhythmic Airplay (Billboard)	19
Venezuela Pop Rock (Record Report)	3

=== Year-end charts ===
2013 year-end chart performance for "Applause"
Chart (2013)	Position
Australia (ARIA)	93
Australia (ARIA Dance)	16
Austria (Ö3 Austria Top 40)	75
Belgium (Ultratop 50 Flanders)	87
Belgium (Ultratop 50 Wallonia)	76
Canada (Canadian Hot 100)	50
France (SNEP)	79
Germany (Media Control AG)	62
Hungary (Dance Top 40)	91
Hungary (Rádiós Top 40)	28
Italy Airplay (EarOne)	72
Italy (FIMI)	54
Japan Hot 100 (Billboard)	19
Japan Adult Contemporary (Billboard)	5
Japan Hot Overseas (Billboard)	4
Netherlands (Dutch Top 40)	83
Netherlands (Single Top 100)	80
Russia Airplay (TopHit)	150
South Korea Foreign (Circle)	90
Spain (PROMUSICAE)	46
Sweden (Sverigetopplistan)	93
Switzerland (Sweitzer Hitparade)	68
Taiwan (Hito Radio)	55
Ukraine Airplay (TopHit)	150
UK Singles (Official Charts)	75
US Billboard Hot 100	37
US Adult Pop Airplay (Billboard)	45
US Dance Club Songs (Billboard)	35
US Hot Dance/Electronic Songs (Billboard)	8
US Pop Airplay (Billboard)	37
US Radio Songs (Billboard)	48

2014 year-end chart performance for "Applause"
Chart (2014)	Position
US Hot Dance/Electronic Songs (Billboard)	11

=== Decade-end charts ===
2010s-end chart performance for "Applause"
Chart (2010–2019)	Position
US Hot Dance/Electronic Songs (Billboard)	28

== Certifications and sales ==
Certifications and sales for "Applause"
Region	Certification	Certified units/sales
Australia (ARIA)	4× Platinum	280,000^{‡}
Austria (IFPI Austria)	Platinum	30,000^{*}
Brazil (Pro-Música Brasil)	Diamond	250,000^{‡}
Canada (Music Canada)	5× Platinum	400,000^{‡}
France	—	60,000
Germany (BVMI)	Gold	150,000^{‡}
Italy (FIMI)	Platinum	30,000^{*}
Japan (RIAJ)	Gold	100,000^{*}
Mexico (AMPROFON)	Platinum	60,000^{*}
New Zealand (RMNZ)	Platinum	15,000^{*}
Norway (IFPI Norway)	2× Platinum	120,000^{‡}
South Korea	—	106,385
Spain (Promusicae) Since 2015	Gold	30,000^{‡}
Sweden (GLF)	2× Platinum	80,000^{‡}
United Kingdom (BPI)	Platinum	530,000
United States (RIAA)	4× Platinum	4,000,000^{‡}
Streaming
Denmark (IFPI Danmark)	Gold	900,000^{†}
^{*} Sales figures based on certification alone.^{‡} Sales+streaming figures based on certification alone.^{†} Streaming-only figures based on certification alone.

== Release history ==
Release dates and formats for "Applause"
Region	Date	Format(s)	Version	Label	Ref.
Canada	August 12, 2013	Digital download; streaming	Original	Interscope	
France	August 12, 2013	Radio airplay	Original	Universal	
United States	August 12, 2013	Digital download; streaming	Original	Interscope	
Belgium	August 13, 2013	Digital download; streaming	Original	Universal	
DACH	August 13, 2013	Digital download; streaming	Original	Universal	
Finland	August 13, 2013	Digital download; streaming	Original	Universal	
France	August 13, 2013	Digital download; streaming	Original	Universal	
Ireland	August 13, 2013	Digital download; streaming	Original	Universal	
Italy	August 13, 2013	Digital download; streaming	Original	Universal	
Luxembourg	August 13, 2013	Digital download; streaming	Original	Universal	
Netherlands	August 13, 2013	Digital download; streaming	Original	Universal	
New Zealand	August 13, 2013	Digital download; streaming	Original	Universal	
Norway	August 13, 2013	Digital download; streaming	Original	Universal	
Portugal	August 13, 2013	Digital download; streaming	Original	Universal	
Singapore	August 13, 2013	Digital download; streaming	Original	Universal	
Spain	August 13, 2013	Digital download; streaming	Original	Universal	
Sweden	August 13, 2013	Digital download; streaming	Original	Universal	
United Kingdom	August 13, 2013	Digital download; streaming	Original	Universal	
Italy	August 19, 2013	Radio airplay	Original	Universal	
United States	August 20, 2013	Contemporary hit radio; rhythmic contemporary radio	Original	Interscope	
Japan	September 11, 2013	CD	2-track	Universal	
Germany	September 13, 2013	CD	2-track	Universal	
France	September 16, 2013	Cardsleeve	2-track	Universal	
Singapore	September 16, 2013	CD	2-track	Universal	
United Kingdom	September 16, 2013	CD	2-track	Universal	
Various	September 30, 2013	Digital download; streaming	Remixes	Interscope	
United States	November 29, 2013	LP	Original	Interscope	

== See also ==
- List of number-one singles of the 2010s (Hungary)
- List of number-one singles of 2013 (Spain)
- List of Billboard Hot 100 top-ten singles in 2013
- List of number-one Billboard Dance Club Songs of 2013
- List of number-one Billboard Dance/Electronic Songs of 2013
