= Gaga: Five Foot Two =

2017 documentary film by Chris Moukarbel

- Directed by: Chris Moukarbel
- Produced by: Bobby Campbell; Chris Moukarbel; Heather Parry; Lady Gaga
- Starring: Lady Gaga
- Cinematography: Chris Moukarbel
- Edited by: Greg Arata
- Music by: Patrick Belaga
- Production companies: Live Nation Productions; Mermaid Films; Permanent Wave
- Distributed by: Netflix
- Release dates: September 8, 2017 (TIFF); September 22, 2017 (Worldwide)
- Running time: 100 minutes
- Country: United States
- Language: English

Gaga: Five Foot Two is a 2017 American documentary film directed by Chris Moukarbel about singer Lady Gaga. It was produced by Moukarbel, Gaga, Bobby Campbell, and Heather Parry. Shot in a cinéma vérité style and avoiding retrospective material and conventional interviews, it follows Gaga over the course of a year as she records, releases, and promotes her fifth studio album, Joanne (2016), while also preparing for her performance at the Super Bowl LI halftime show. The film presents an intimate portrait of Gaga's personal and professional life, including her relationships with family, friends, collaborators, and fans, and foregrounds her struggle with chronic pain, later identified as fibromyalgia. The project originated through Gaga's management team and was produced by Live Nation, with Moukarbel filming much of the documentary himself over an approximately eight-month period and shaping it as an intimate, present-tense portrait rather than a conventional retrospective.

Gaga: Five Foot Two premiered at the 2017 Toronto International Film Festival on September 8, 2017, and was released globally on Netflix on September 22. The film received generally favorable reviews from critics. Many reviewers praised its emotional candor, behind-the-scenes access, and Gaga's willingness to appear vulnerable, particularly in scenes dealing with chronic pain, family, and loneliness. Others commended Moukarbel's intimate approach and the documentary's portrayal of Gaga as more human and emotionally exposed than in earlier celebrity images. More critical reviews, however, argued that the film was too carefully managed, lacked narrative focus and context, and offered a limited or overly curated portrait of its subject, with several critics unfavorably comparing it to Madonna: Truth or Dare (1991). The film won Best Music Documentary at the 2018 MTV Movie & TV Awards, and also received awards from the NME Awards and the Webby Awards.

== Synopsis ==
Gaga: Five Foot Two is a documentary that follows a year in the life of American singer Lady Gaga at age 30 as she records, releases, and promotes her fifth studio album, Joanne. The film presents an intimate portrait of Gaga's personal and professional life, documenting her interactions with family members, friends, collaborators, employees, and fans. It also foregrounds her struggle with chronic pain, later identified as fibromyalgia, showing how it disrupts her daily routines, rehearsals, performances, and studio work, and tracing her attempts to manage it through treatment and physical therapy. The film juxtaposes scenes from Gaga's working life with more informal moments, including her cooking at home, sitting topless by a pool, and speaking candidly about men and the pressures surrounding her public life.

A central focus of the documentary is the creation and promotion of Joanne. Gaga is shown in recording sessions with collaborators including Mark Ronson and BloodPop, as well as with "Hey Girl" duet partner Florence Welch. The film follows several aspects of the album's rollout, including the shooting of the music video for "Perfect Illusion" in the desert, during which Gaga wonders whether fans will be disappointed by her departure from the elaborate costumes of her earlier career, getting a Joanne tattoo, the online leak of the album, and a visit to Walmart to check its placement in stores. A sequence of Gaga interacting with fans is intercut with archival footage of her earlier, more extravagant appearances, highlighting the contrast between her past image and the more stripped-back persona she adopted for Joanne.

The film also explores Gaga's emotional vulnerability during this period. It addresses the breakdown of her engagement to Taylor Kinney, her loneliness despite constant public attention, and her reflections on fame, heartbreak, and womanhood. She speaks about the ways she used performance and spectacle to reclaim control over her image, citing her 2009 performance of "Paparazzi" at the 2009 MTV Video Music Awards as an example, and discusses how fame and public scrutiny have affected women in entertainment, referring to figures such as Marilyn Monroe and Anna Nicole Smith. She also expresses frustration with the power male producers hold over women in the music industry. Her family forms another important part of the narrative, particularly in scenes related to the album's dedication to her late aunt Joanne, including one in which she plays the title track to her grandmother, as well as more private moments such as attending the baptism of musician Brian Newman's daughter Sistilia, of whom Gaga is the godmother.

Alongside its focus on Joanne, the documentary includes footage of other performances and appearances, such as Gaga singing "Bad Romance" on piano at the 90th birthday celebration of her longtime collaborator Tony Bennett, performing "You and I" at an event for the 2016 Democratic National Convention in Camden, New Jersey, and delivering "Angel Down" on the rooftop of the Bitter End in New York City. (Note: The performance at the Bitter End was part of Gaga's Dive Bar Tour (2016).) It also touches on other facets of her life and career, including a moment of distress on the set of American Horror Story: Roanoke, in which she had a guest role, receiving balloons from Bradley Cooper in celebration of their film A Star Is Born being greenlit, and her comments on Madonna, whom she says she continued to admire despite being hurt that Madonna had criticized her through the media rather than confronting her face to face.

Another major thread is the preparation for the Super Bowl LI halftime show, which also frames the documentary. The film follows the performance from early planning meetings, in which Gaga describes the opportunity as a dream come true and expresses her desire to defy public expectations, to the day of the show, when she reflects on its significance in her career and urges herself to enjoy the moment. The documentary concludes with Gaga preparing to take the stage, while the end credits feature footage from performances promoting Joanne.

== Appearances ==
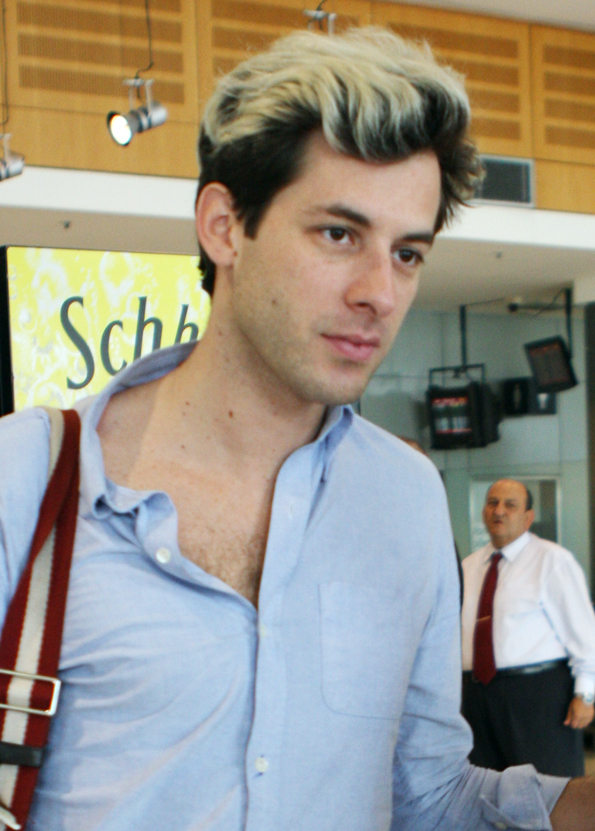
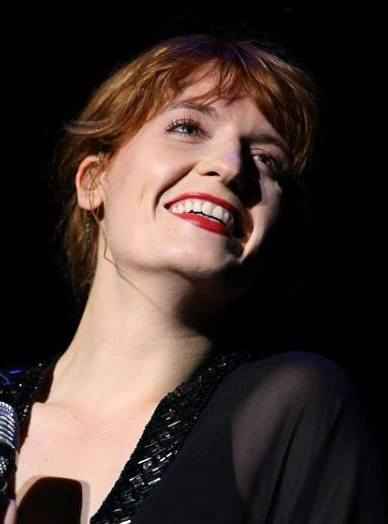
Joanne collaborators Mark Ronson and Florence Welch make appearances in the film.

As listed in the film's end credits.

- Lady Gaga
- Angelina Calderone Germanotta, grandmother
- Cynthia Germanotta, mother
- Joe Germanotta, father
- Natali Germanotta, sister
- Sonja Durham, Haus of Gaga member and friend
- Bobby Campbell, manager
- Tony Bennett, musician
- Brian Newman, musician
- Florence Welch, musician
- BloodPop, producer
- Mark Ronson, producer
- Richy Jackson, choreographer
- Frederic Aspiras, hairstylist
- Ruth Hogben, filmmaker
- Donatella Versace, fashion designer

== Production ==
=== Development ===
The project originated through Gaga's management team, which had discussed making a documentary about the singer for some time, though, according to the film's director, Chris Moukarbel, there was initially "no urgency" around it. The idea was first raised by Gaga's longtime manager Bobby Campbell in conversations with Live Nation, which produced the film, and the company subsequently suggested Moukarbel as director. Gaga was at first reluctant to participate, as she was focused on writing and recording and did not want a film project to become a distraction. According to Moukarbel, there was no formal preparation period before filming began, and that the project was introduced casually through Campbell while Gaga was working on her record.

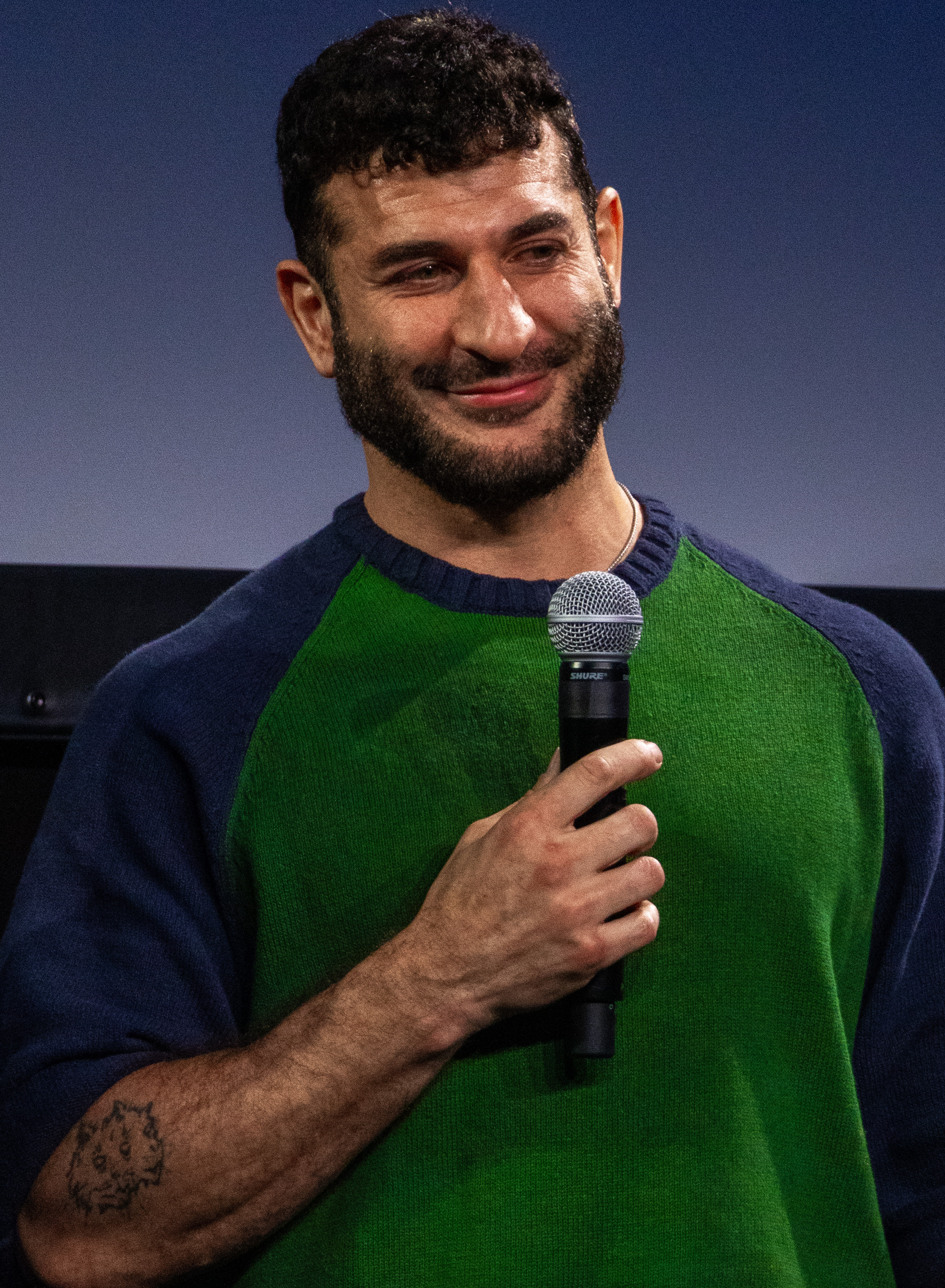
Director Chris Moukarbel conceived the film as a cinéma vérité-style portrait of Gaga.

Produced by Moukarbel, Gaga, Bobby Campbell, and Heather Parry, Gaga: Five Foot Two was conceived by its director as a cinéma vérité-style portrait centered on a limited period in Gaga's life, avoiding sit-down interviews, talking heads, and retrospective material about her past. He said he wanted to "keep the camera on her" and capture "what was happening in the moment", rather than rely on others to explain her work ethic or career. His intention, he added, was not to make "a movie about fame", but rather a portrait of "an artist who is famous" and the conditions she must navigate in order to create her work. The director also intentionally avoided making a film that resembled Madonna: Truth or Dare (1991), despite regarding it as a benchmark for the music documentary genre. Elsewhere, Moukarbel described the finished film as an "impressionistic portrait" rather than journalism or an attempt at establishing an "objective truth". He likewise said the film's style was meant to place viewers "in the present moment with her", minimizing archival material and backstory in favor of immediacy. Entertainment Weekly reported that the film was conceived as a "completely new project", unrelated to Gaga's abandoned documentary plans with Terry Richardson, and that both Gaga and Moukarbel wanted it to focus on "a very specific time in her life".

Filming took place over about eight months, as Moukarbel followed Gaga during the making of Joanne and, later, her preparation for the Super Bowl LI halftime show. The latter was not part of the original plan, but became the story's natural ending once Gaga learned during filming that she had been booked for the performance. Moukarbel said that the Super Bowl structure appealed to him because its live, high-pressure format made it a fitting way to bookend the documentary. Filming began in June 2016, after Gaga had already finished writing the album. Moukarbel recalled that the first day he filmed Gaga—at her home, as she cooked and then went to the studio—ultimately formed the basis of the film's opening scenes.

Moukarbel said he began editing while production was still underway, reviewing footage with his editor in order to identify the story early and shape later filming accordingly. Most of the documentary was shot by Moukarbel alone, as Gaga generally preferred not to have a larger crew around while she was writing or working, although additional crew members were brought in for larger-scale events such as the Super Bowl and music video shoots. He also noted that the camera's relationship to Gaga changes over the course of the film: early scenes are shot in close proximity, while later ones place her farther away and increasingly surrounded by staff as "the demands of her career start to take over". Despite Live Nation's financial backing, he said much of the production remained small-scale and was paid for out of his own pocket because the level of access required a minimal setup, often consisting only of himself and a camera. He later told Entertainment Tonight that he had initially imagined incorporating more overtly stylized or produced footage, but abandoned those ideas because they did not feel appropriate to the film's more intimate approach. Roughly half of the footage, he added, was shot in the studio, though much of it was omitted from the final cut because it became repetitive once the broader shape of Gaga’s life during the period came into focus.

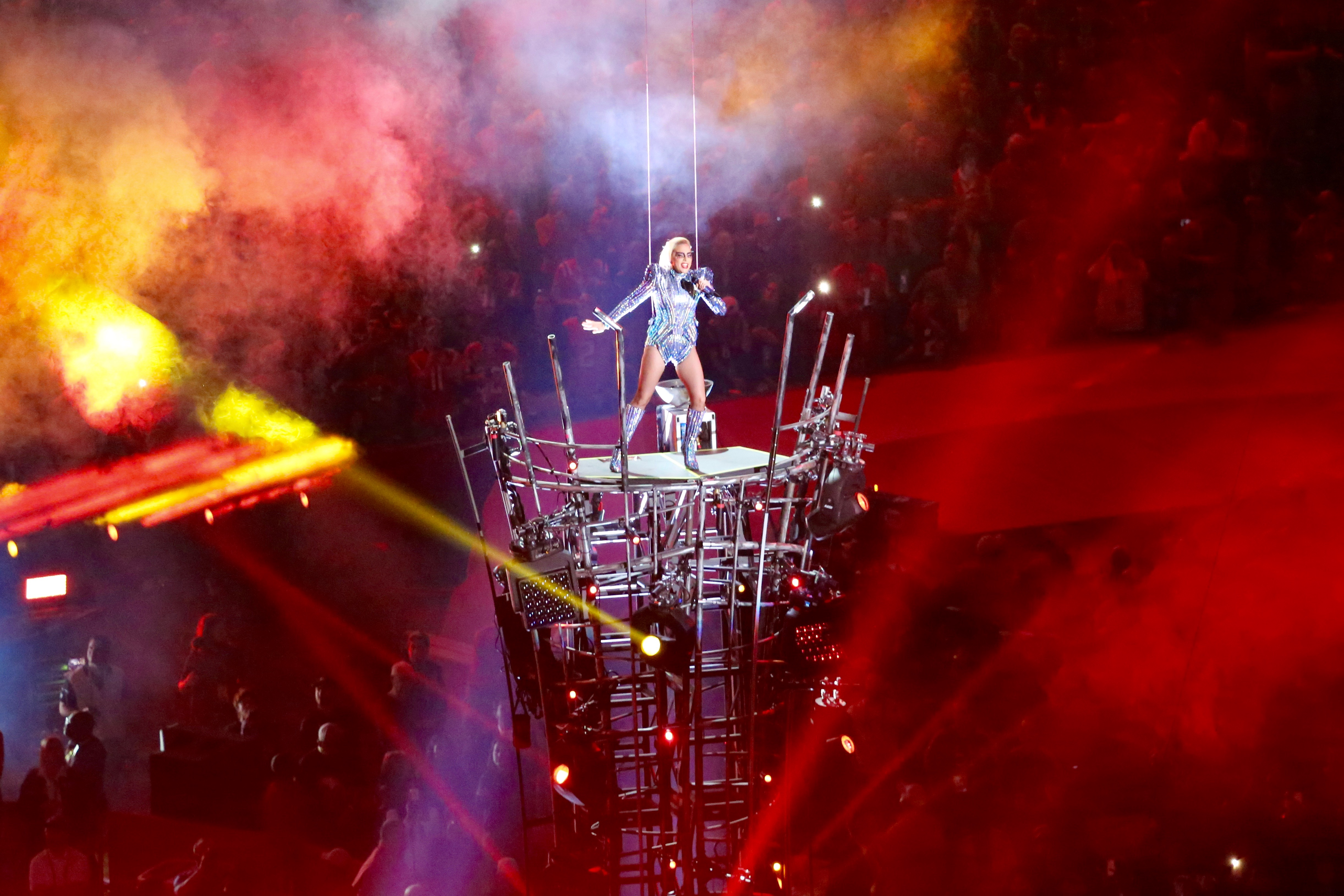
The Super Bowl LI halftime show became a central focus of the documentary during production.

Moukarbel and Gaga agreed that he would film everything he saw unless she asked him to stop, which happened only rarely. Filming was usually paused when conversations involved people who were not present or topics Gaga considered too sensitive, including aspects of her relationship with Taylor Kinney. In later interviews, Gaga shared that she had decided "really early on" to give Moukarbel "full access" to her life and that she tried to ignore the presence of the cameras so that the documentary could capture events as naturally as possible. She said she wanted to be fully invested as the documentary's subject, rather than shape it into "a commercial" about why audiences should admire her. Gaga also added that she and Moukarbel had not known each other before production began, and praised him for being "respectful of [her] space, even when it was very private moments". Although she described herself as a somewhat unwilling participant, she said the positive reactions of her friends and family to early cuts encouraged her to continue with the project. She believed the documentary carried a "positive message" about her experiences as a woman, and linked it to her broader belief in personal expression and in creating art that would inspire and entertain people. Moukarbel said the film did not maintain a strict fourth wall, and that he chose to retain moments when Gaga addressed the camera because they made the documentary feel more honest.

Gaga decided not to watch the documentary until its premiere at the Toronto International Film Festival, giving Moukarbel creative freedom in shaping the final film. One of the few elements she specifically wanted included was her chronic pain, as she hoped viewers dealing with similar conditions would feel less alone. Moukarbel added that Gaga's willingness to remove herself from her usual overseeing role ultimately "made for a better movie", and said that the trust between them developed gradually and organically as he followed her through everyday routines and studio sessions. Campbell said he wanted Gaga to feel "free enough to truly be herself and allow the cameras to disappear", rather than participate in what he described as a "hyper-produced, filtered look" at her life. One especially intimate moment used in the film originated from audio Moukarbel captured while Gaga was speaking off camera with her assistant; he included it only after obtaining her permission. Since Gaga did not review the film during editing, Moukarbel showed her only a small number of scenes he considered especially sensitive, such as the doctor's appointment and the discussion of Madonna, to make sure she was comfortable with their inclusion. He also said that Gaga viewed the project as "an artistic adventure", which helped explain her openness to emotionally difficult material.

=== Music ===
In addition to songs from Joanne – including "Million Reasons", "John Wayne", and "Diamond Heart" – and other performances by Gaga, the documentary also features music from other artists, including Sonnymoon's "Just Before Dawn", Chilly Gonzales's "Gogo", Sofi Tukker's "Matadora", Richard Swift's "Would You?", Guy Lombardo's recording of "Has Anybody Seen My Gal?", Trentemøller's remix of "The Mole" by Chimes & Bells, Anna Meredith's "Nautilus", and "Stand on the Word" by the Joubert Singers. Patrick Belaga was credited with the film's original score. Writing for i-D, Sophie Wilkinson argued that the soundtrack not only documents the creation and promotion of Joanne, but also offers insight into Gaga's musical tastes and helps communicate ideas of paranoia, hard work, beauty, and the costs of fame. She highlighted the use of "Kaval Sviri" by the Bulgarian State Television Female Vocal Choir during the Super Bowl sequences, Colin Stetson's instrumental music in quieter reflective passages, and Belaga's score in scenes depicting Gaga's chronic pain.

== Release ==
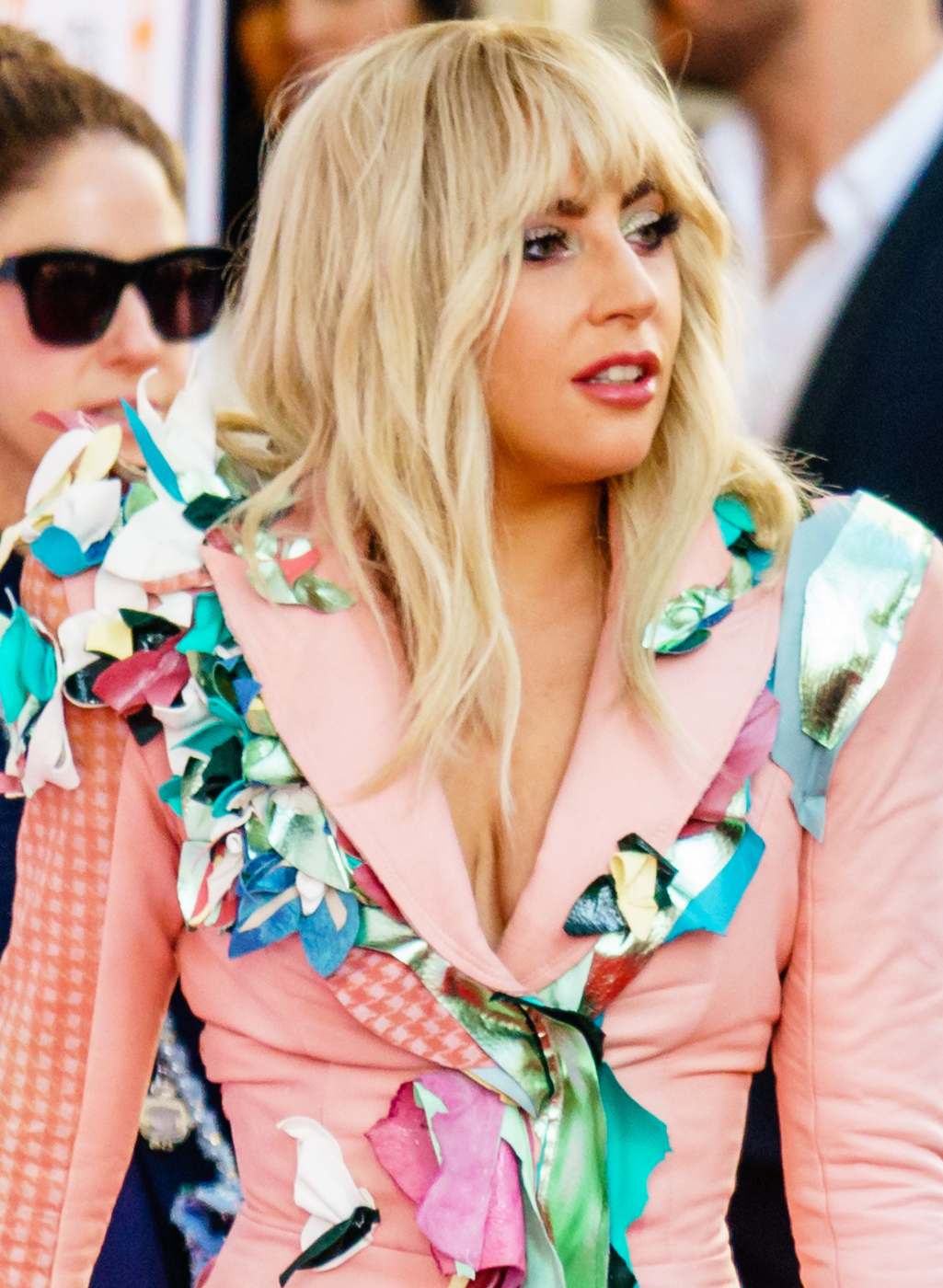
Lady Gaga at the premiere of Gaga: Five Foot Two at the 2017 Toronto International Film Festival

The documentary was announced by Netflix in August 2017, alongside a series of teaser clips shared by Gaga on social media. In promotional material, the streaming service described the film as "an intimate and unfettered portrait of a year in the life of Lady Gaga", while the teasers previewed scenes of Gaga preparing for the halftime show, receiving medical treatment, and speaking about loneliness and Madonna. In a separate video, Gaga stated that she had chosen not to watch most of the documentary before its release because she felt she could not be objective about herself, adding "So you'll see it before I do."

Gaga: Five Foot Two debuted at the Toronto International Film Festival on September 8, 2017, in the Princess of Wales Theatre. At the premiere, Gaga said it was important to her that viewers not see "how perfect everything is", as she wanted the film to present a more authentic portrayal of her life and career. She also expressed hope that the film's depiction of her struggle with chronic pain would help others facing similar challenges feel less alone. Shortly before the screening began, Gaga performed a piano rendition of "Bad Romance", which she dedicated to Moukarbel.

The film became available on Netflix on September 22, 2017, simultaneously in 190 countries. It was later also shown before each concert during the 2018 European leg of Gaga's Joanne World Tour.

=== Artwork ===
On August 24, 2017, Gaga unveiled the documentary's poster and cover artwork online. Created by Berlin-based German artist Pierre Schmidt (aka Drømsjel), it features rainbow waterfalls, flowers, and an extra eye streaming down Gaga's face. Drømsjel's work, characterized by a surreal combination of vintage collage and digital manipulation, attracted the attention of Moukarbel, who had been following the artist's work on Instagram before contacting him to create the poster. According to Drømsjel, the piece was a collaborative effort between himself, Gaga and her team, Netflix, and Dutch photography duo Inez and Vinoodh, who shot the photo used for the cover for Gaga's 2016 Harper's Bazaar editorial. The pair have photographed Gaga for a variety of past projects including the cover art for her 2013 single, "Applause". Schmidt stated that the collaborators discussed extensively how to produce a distinctive and "iconic" image for the documentary ahead of its premiere. He has also cited artists such as Salvador Dalí among the inspirations for his surreal visual style.

== Reception ==
=== Critical response ===
Gaga: Five Foot Two has received generally favorable reviews from critics. On Rotten Tomatoes, it has an approval rating of 73%, based on 44 reviews, with an average rating of 6.40/10. The website's critical consensus reads, "Gaga: Five Foot Two offers an absorbing glimpse of its superstar subject's backstage life, albeit one weakened by inconsistent focus and a dearth of performance footage." On Metacritic, the film has a weighted average score of 63 out of 100, based on 15 critics, indicating "generally favorable" reviews.

Daniel D'Addario of Time described Gaga: Five Foot Two as "a riveting piece of work", praising it for its rawness and emotional immediacy. Comparing the film to documentaries about other pop singers, he felt its power lies in Gaga's unusual openness and in its portrayal of a vulnerable period in her career that many pop stars would have concealed. Pitchfork's Judy Berman wrote that Gaga: Five Foot Two brings Gaga "several inches closer to earth" and found the documentary "intriguingly raw". Adam Graham of The Detroit News called Gaga: Five Foot Two an engaging portrait of Gaga that captures "very human moments", and praised the documentary for offering an intimate look at her life beyond fame without the need for outside voices or talking heads. Vanity Fair's Julie Miller called Gaga: Five Foot Two a "searingly raw" and "surprisingly emotional" documentary, praising Gaga's willingness to appear in vulnerable moments, including scenes of chronic pain and emotional distress, and noting her self-awareness and humor throughout the film. Jazz Tangcay of Awards Daily praised Moukarbel for offering a revealing look behind Gaga's celebrity image, highlighting the film's undercurrent of loneliness and its depiction of the toll fame has taken on her personal life. She deemed Gaga: Five Foot Two as a "captivating and terrific documentary" that offers "a treasure trove of new and refreshing insight". Jennifer Gannon of The Irish Times described the film as the moment "an icon of statuesque proportions is captured shrinking to human-size", praising it for showing Gaga in a rare period of uncertainty and vulnerability. She argued that the film ultimately suggests Gaga is most fully restored through the artifice of performance, particularly in its buildup to the Super Bowl LI halftime show.

Other reviewers responded with more nuance to the documentary's intimacy. Lauren O'Neill of Vice viewed the film as a revealing portrait of Gaga's loneliness amid fame and praised it for showing the physical and emotional toll of her demanding schedule. She found it most effective when it focused on Gaga's vulnerability, especially in scenes involving her family, singling out the moment she plays "Joanne" to her grandmother as its most moving passage. Although O'Neill noted that the documentary is not entirely candid, she ultimately considered its unpolished depiction of Gaga's ordinary, offstage self to be valuable. The New Yorker's Amanda Petrusich described Gaga: Five Foot Two as engaging and unusually coherent for a music documentary, but argued that its most compelling moments are the unintentional ones, when Gaga's self-presentation seems at odds with what the camera captures. She wrote that the film conveys the loneliness of fame and the troubling blur between personal and professional relationships in Gaga's entourage, while also questioning the documentary's carefully managed intimacy and selective candor.

The Hollywood Reporter's Leslie Felperin complimented scenes such as Gaga playing "Joanne" for her grandmother, but found that despite the jarring camerawork, the singer remained overly focused and scripted about her appearance. Felperin was nevertheless positive about the film's technical execution, praising its editing and sound design for conveying "the frenzy of Gaga's life". Caryn James of the BBC opined that, although Gaga: Five Foot Two carries an empowering message, it is ultimately "both raw and calculated", with Moukarbel's fragmented style helping to obscure how carefully the documentary controls Gaga's image. She concluded that it serves as a "carefully designed delivery system" for Gaga's more serious persona. For Ed Potton of The Times, Gaga appeared volatile in the documentary, pointing to moments such as her complaints about Madonna, removing her bikini top mid-conversation, and reacting angrily to an unapproved costume change. He added, however, that these diva-like moments are tempered by self-awareness and the pressure of preparing for a performance before a global audience of 117 million. Dan Callahan of TheWrap wrote that Gaga: Five Foot Two captures Gaga "at a down time in her life", portraying her as emotionally fragile and worn down by chronic pain. While he noted moments of openness and self-awareness, he suggested that the film shows a performer exhausted by spectacle and in need of renewed focus on her music.

Several writers responded especially positively to the documentary's depiction of chronic pain. Mauren Lee Lenker of Entertainment Weekly and Je Banach of Vogue, both of whom have fibromyalgia, praised Gaga's openness about her condition; Lenker wrote that the film left her "continually choking back tears" and made her feel seen and less alone, while Banach described it as a "rallying cry" for people with chronic pain and argued that its portrayal of vulnerability as strength helps confront the stigma surrounding invisible illnesses. Writing for The Atlantic, Spencer Kornhaber argued that the film and Gaga's public discussion of fibromyalgia highlighted the broader skepticism with which women's pain is often treated, and suggested that the documentary invites viewers to confront assumptions about whether a pop star's suffering should be believed.

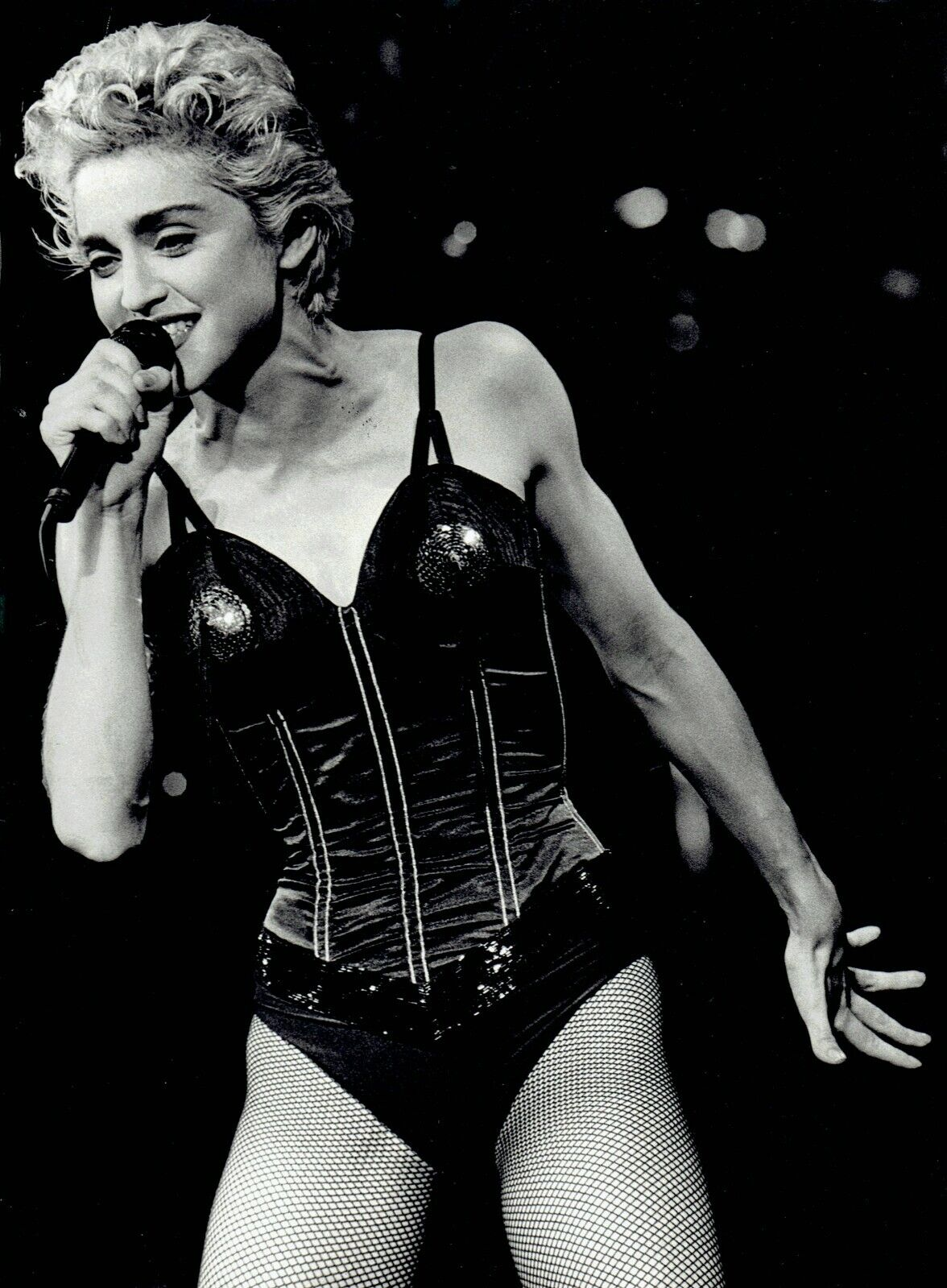
Some reviewers made comparisons to Truth or Dare, a 1991 documentary film about Madonna (pictured in 1987).

Film critic Owen Gleiberman reviewed the documentary for Variety, writing that "Gaga radiates a potent energy — she's intensely funny and aware", and compared it to other musical documentaries such as Madonna: Truth or Dare. He commended Moukarbel's direction, saying that he was able to "mix things up", showcasing Gaga's meltdowns as well as her camaraderie with fans. In his review on RogerEbert.com, Peter Sobczynski opined that, although Gaga: Five Foot Two does not reach the level of landmark music documentaries such as Bob Dylan's Dont Look Back (1967) or Truth or Dare, it still creates "a sense of intimacy and revelation", even if Gaga never appears fully unguarded. He added that what makes the documentary work is Gaga's "inspiring and engaging presence". Josh Modell of The A.V. Club wrote that Gaga: Five Foot Two feels less contrived than Truth or Dare, presenting Gaga as less cool but more human. While he found the documentary somewhat dull in its early attempts to humanize her, he praised its behind-the-scenes access and said it ultimately does "a nice job" of capturing her emotionally intense and "sometimes grotesquely glamorous life".

Among the more negative reviews, Eric Henderson of Slant Magazine argued that the film lacks the "momentum and artistic intent" of stronger music documentaries and often settles for "feigned realism as its own reward". CNN's Brian Lowry felt the documentary offers an intimate look at Gaga's life but rarely feels "as spontaneous or illuminating as [its] access would suggest", adding that parts of the film approach "the edge of tedium". Benjamin H. Smith of the Decider found the film engaging for fans but ultimately "a little disappointing", noting that despite attempts to reveal Gaga's ordinary side, "very little about her life is ordinary", and concluding that "sometimes the illusion is better than the reality". In a two-star review for The Guardian, Bryan Armen Graham described the documentary as "artfully directed" and "meticulously curated", but argued that it follows familiar genre beats and never becomes as revealing as it seems to promise. While he noted moments of vulnerability and sincerity, he concluded that Five Foot Two ultimately plays like "a longform advert" for Gaga's new phase, with "the mask still firmly in place". Patti Greco of Cosmopolitan felt that the documentary lacked a compelling dramatic structure, writing that "aside from the story about her aunt and a few brief mentions about her split from Taylor Kinney, there's not an arc to the documentary, let alone stakes."

Lorraine Ali of the Los Angeles Times unfavorably compared Gaga: Five Foot Two to Madonna's Truth or Dare, arguing that it is a disjointed pastiche of generic pop-star clichés that offers too little insight into Gaga beyond documenting a career reinvention. While she found scenes involving Gaga's chronic pain, her breakup with Taylor Kinney, and her family affecting, Ali ultimately concluded that "a star isn't born here, she's diminished". Brad Wheeler of The Globe and Mail described Gaga: Five Foot Two as "Madonna: Truth or Dare, but without the dare", calling the documentary "entertaining but manipulative". He argued that Gaga appears constantly self-aware on camera and that Moukarbel largely indulges her presentation, while also criticizing the film for ending before the Super Bowl halftime show itself, which he felt left its climax unsatisfying. The Village Voice's Kelsey McKinney similarly argued that the film lacks context and a clear narrative focus, criticizing it for presenting Gaga's pain without adequately explaining its origins or significance. She also found that, compared to Truth or Dare, the documentary offers too little insight into Gaga's relationships or inner life, concluding that it resembles "an extended Instagram story" more than a fully developed documentary. Emily Yoshida of Vulture felt that Gaga: Five Foot Two is too narrowly focused on events immediately preceding its production to provide a fuller sense of her life or career. Although she found the film superficially intimate and considered the Super Bowl scenes its most focused material, Yoshida criticized its lack of context about Gaga's roots and said it ultimately feels "like a rest stop before the comeback the film would never acknowledge is still on the horizon".

=== Accolades ===
| Award | Date of ceremony | Category | Recipient(s) and nominee(s) | Result | Ref(s) |
|---|---|---|---|---|---|
| Cinema Audio Society Awards | February 24, 2018 | Outstanding Achievement in Sound Mixing for a Motion Picture – Documentary | Jonathan Wales; Jason Dotts | Nominated | |
| Hollywood Music in Media Awards | November 17, 2017 | Music Documentary / Special Program | Gaga: Five Foot Two | Nominated | |
| MTV Movie & TV Awards | June 16, 2018 | Best Music Documentary | Gaga: Five Foot Two | Won | |
| NME Awards | February 13, 2018 | Best Music Film | Gaga: Five Foot Two | Won | |
| Webby Awards | May 14, 2018 | Online Film & Video: Best Music – People's Choice | Gaga: Five Foot Two; Live Nation Productions | Won | |
| Webby Awards | May 14, 2018 | Online Film & Video: Best Editing – People's Choice | Gaga: Five Foot Two; Live Nation Productions | Won | |

== See also ==
- List of original films distributed by Netflix
