= Joanne (Lady Gaga song) =

2017 single by Lady Gaga

- Piano version single cover

Single by Lady Gaga

from the album Joanne
- Released: December 22, 2017
- Recorded: 2016
- Studio: Shangri-La (Malibu); Pink Duck (Burbank)
- Genre: Country
- Length: 3:16 (album version); 4:39 (piano version)
- Label: Interscope
- Songwriters: Stefani Germanotta; Mark Ronson
- Producers: Album version: Mark Ronson; Lady Gaga; BloodPop; Piano version: Lady Gaga; DJ White Shadow; Mark Nilan Jr.; Nick Monson

Lady Gaga singles chronology
"The Cure" (2017)	"Joanne" (2017)	"Shallow" (2018)

Music video
- "Joanne (Where Do You Think You’re Goin’?)" on YouTube

"Joanne" is a song recorded by American singer Lady Gaga from her fifth studio album of the same name. It was released as the album's third official single on December 22, 2017, in Italy, and a piano version, titled "Joanne (Where Do You Think You're Goin'?)", followed in the rest of the world on January 26, 2018. The track was written and produced by Gaga and Mark Ronson, with additional production from BloodPop. Inspired by the singer's late aunt, Joanne Germanotta, the song became a focal point for the musical direction of the album. Gaga intended the song to have a healing effect for those dealing with loss and pain.

Musically, it is a country song with stripped-down acoustic composition. The lyrics talk about Joanne's death from the point of view of Gaga's family. The track was complimented for Gaga's vocals and the personal, stripped-down nature of the composition. Prior to being released as a single, "Joanne" had minor chart placements in France and the United Kingdom. Gaga performed "Joanne" at the 60th Grammy Awards and during her Joanne World Tour (2017–2018). It was also featured in the 2017 documentary Gaga: Five Foot Two, during a scene involving Gaga and her grandmother listening to the track.

The piano version of the song was accompanied by the release of a music video, which continued the loose storyline set in the previous videos for the album. The clip shows the singer belting the song around various natural settings and was critically praised. This version of the song won the Grammy Award for Best Pop Solo Performance at the 61st Annual Grammy Awards.

== Background and development ==
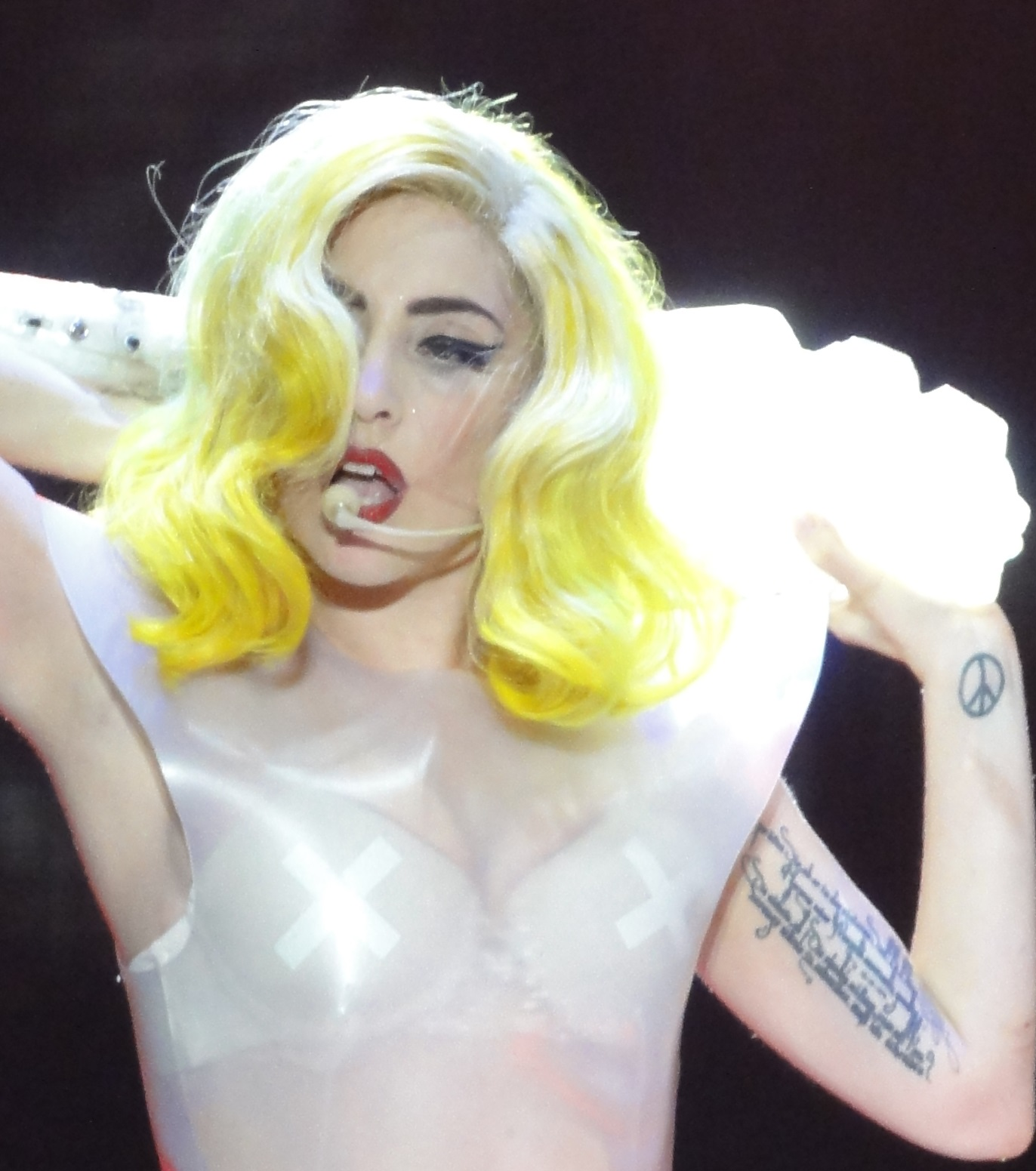
A tattoo on Gaga's left biceps displays the date of her aunt Joanne's death.

Lady Gaga's deceased aunt, Joanne Germanotta, had a profound effect on the singer's life and career. Gaga included one of her aunt's unpublished poems on her first album's booklet, and tattooed the date of her death on her left arm. She had initially written a song called "Paradise", inspired by her aunt, while making her fourth studio album, Cheek to Cheek, in 2014 with Tony Bennett. However, the song was not included on the album. While developing her fifth studio album in 2016, Joanne, Gaga wrote its title track with producer Mark Ronson at Shangri-La Studios, where the rest of the album was crafted. Describing the song as "the true heart and soul of the record", Gaga emphasized how much Joanne had influenced her family and herself.

Joanne died due to complications arising from the autoimmune disease lupus when she was 19 years old. In an interview, Gaga revealed that Joanne's lupus got more complicated after she experienced a sexual assault, and those complications resulted in her death. The incident affected the Germanotta family and according to Gaga, the grief never left them completely. Writing "Joanne" helped Gaga deal with her father's pain of losing his sister. During the New York City show of her Dive Bar Tour (2016), Gaga added that despite the song's relevance to her family, she wanted the track to appeal to everyone who had suffered the loss of any loved ones.

"My connection to her has been strong my whole life. I always wondered what it was—the mystery of Joanne—this person that I never got to meet that was an absolute tornado of both love and tragedy... She was a powerful, beautiful force in my family's life and then it's like a beautiful light that just goes out, so I've always used the fact that she didn't get to live the rest of her life as a sense of strength and power within me that I have to go out and live the rest for her."

== Recording and composition ==
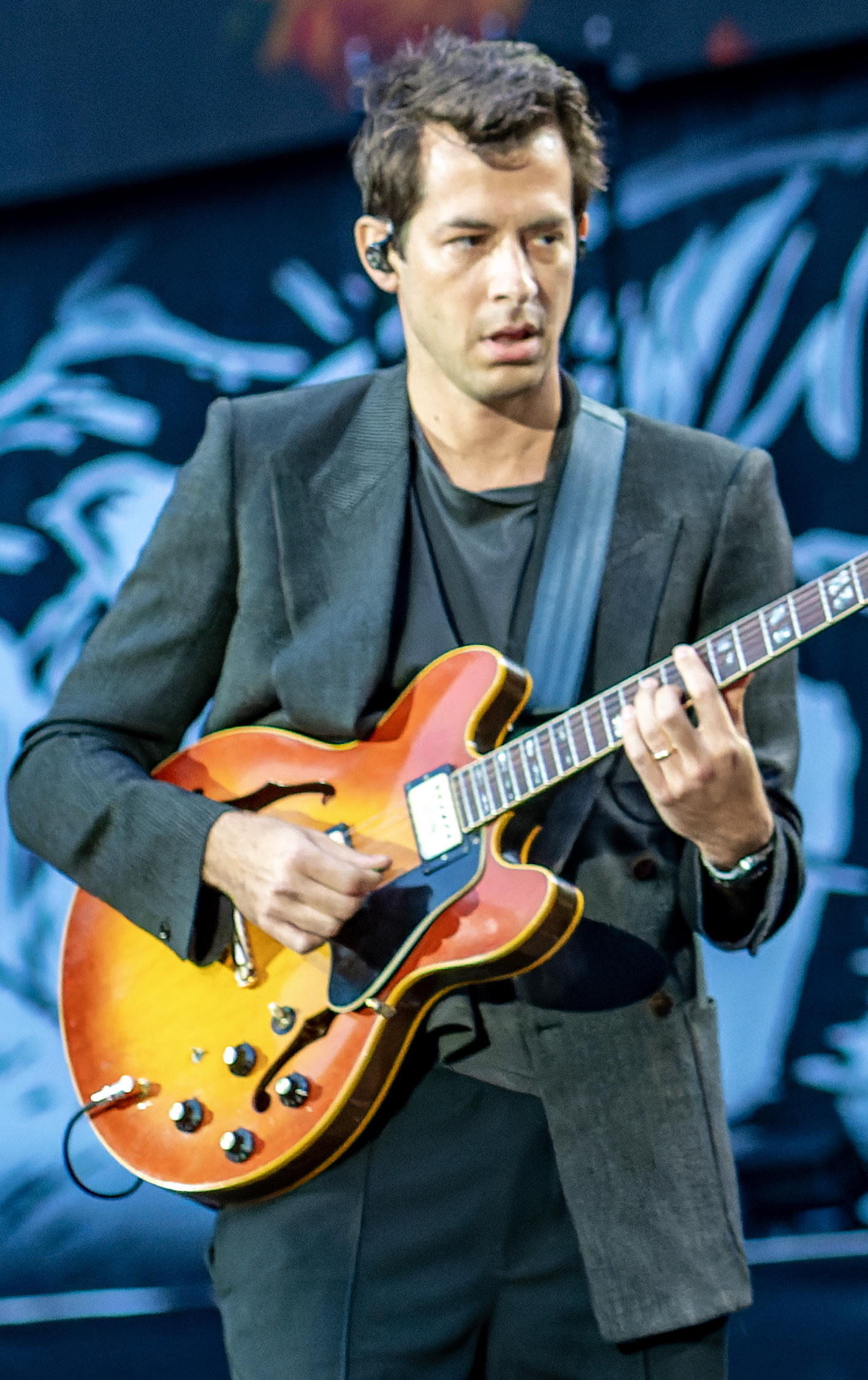
The song was co-written and co-produced by Mark Ronson (pictured in 2022).

"Joanne" is an acoustic country ballad; Stephen Thomas Erlewine of AllMusic stated that it "winks at" Dolly Parton's "Jolene" (1973). In an interview with Zane Lowe on Beats 1, Gaga revealed that it was recorded in one take. The song is written in the time signature of common time with a moderately slow tempo of 74 beats per minute. It is composed in the key of G major, with Gaga's vocals ranging from E_{3} to D_{5}. "Joanne"'s chord progressions follow a basic sequence of G–D–C–G–D–C during the verses, and C–D–Em–C–C/B–Am_{7}–D during the chorus. The album version runs for 3 minutes and 16 seconds while the piano version is 4 minutes and 39 seconds long.

The third track on the record, "Joanne" is the first time that the overall tempo of the album slows. The composition is stripped-down, with Gaga's vocals accompanied by an acoustic guitar. The singer uses a different vocal register, making the song sound like a lullaby with added percussion sounds. Andrew Unterberger of Billboard noted that the lyrics, which pay homage to Joanne, are written in the first person, but the context is derived from Gaga's family's perspective about her aunt's death. The tempo and somberness is further enhanced in the piano version, which highlighted only Gaga's vocals with only a piano in the back. This version of the song concludes with additional lyrics, as Gaga sings the line: "Call me Joanne. xo, Joanne. xoxo, Joanne." A Vulture article noted that by acknowledging her middle name, Gaga resolves the Joanne era "on a peaceful note" with the song.

The song featured writing and producing credit from Gaga and Ronson, with additional production on the track by BloodPop. Dave Russell and Joshua Blair recorded it at Shangri-La Studios, Malibu, California, where they were assisted by David Covell and Johnnie Burik. Additional recording work was performed by Blair and Justin Smith at Pink Duck Studios, Burbank, California. Tom Elmhirst did the audio mixing of "Joanne" at Electric Lady Studios in New York, with assistance from Joe Visciano and Brandon Bost. The mastering was done at Sterling Sound Studios in New York, by Tom Coyne and Randy Merrill. "Joanne" featured a number of instrumentations, including bass, guitar, keyboards, and Mellotron strings by Ronson; rhythmic tracks by BloodPop; acoustic guitars by Harper Simon; and percussion by Gaga.

== Critical reception ==
Rob Sheffield of Rolling Stone described "Joanne" as "a touching ballad", where "any trace of disco or glam" is muted by her "ostentatiously squeaky fingers on the guitar strings". NME's Emily Mackay wrote that it is "a leavetaking song of great, simple beauty, more tenderly affecting than anything Gaga's done before, showcasing the emotive power rather than the force of that great voice". Sal Cinquemani of Slant Magazine gave the track a positive review in comparison to other ballads on the album, stating that the song "boasts a sublime hook and a relatively restrained vocal performance". Marc Snetiker of Entertainment Weekly said that it was "Gaga's most disarming and original ballad in years".

Writing for The Daily Telegraph, Neil McCormich called the track "lovely" and said it was "sung with unpolished directness, emphasizing lyrical themes of living a purposeful life". Sandy Cohen of The Washington Times said that "the title song is fittingly tender, though Gaga's voice sounds affected. Backed by acoustic guitar and simple percussion, it ultimately lends the track a timeless feel." Writing for The Irish Times, Laurence Mackin called it "a gorgeous guitar ballad", saying that "it strips off the plastic pop armour and reveals a much tougher, rawer side." Conversely, Jon Caramanica wrote in The New York Times that, "The title track features what's presented as the least-performed singing—listen to how she flattens out the vowel sounds, as a sort of gesture of accessibility—but it is too unsteady to lean on."

Kristen S. Hé of Vulture favored the piano version of "Joanne", which she found "sparser and even more haunting", noting that "Gaga croons gently, letting the lyric speak for itself" in the track. Lauren O'Neill of Vice felt the revised version "gives the song new breathing space, and a more classic tone”. She further argued that this format (piano-only arrangements) is where Gaga might "achieve real timelessness, without gimmicks or schtick". This rendition of "Joanne" won in the category of Best Pop Solo Performance at the 61st Annual Grammy Awards.

== Music video ==
Gaga walking across a bridge in the music video. The scene was considered by Elite Daily's Hollee Actman Becker as a symbol of Joanne crossing into the afterlife.

On January 24, 2018, Gaga revealed on Twitter that she would be releasing a music video along with a piano version of the song. The release was accompanied by the singer asking for donation to the Lupus Research Alliance based in New York City. The clip, which debuted online two days later, continues the loose narrative depicted in the previous music videos for the Joanne album. It starts from where the music video of "John Wayne" had ended, with Gaga venturing into the woods carrying her guitar. The "Joanne" video alternates between black and white and colored scenes, showing the singer playing instruments, wandering outdoors, playing pool with her friends, and walking alone in the forest. The opening slide talks about who Joanne was, with the closing slide showing her birthday and the day of her death. The video features a cameo appearance from Gaga's sister, Natali Germanotta.

Joey Nolfi from Entertainment Weekly described the visual as "gorgeous", feeling that it "seems to favor the beauty of the journey over the destination... We still don't know where [Gaga] thinks she's going." Hollee Actman Becker from Elite Daily found symbolism in the scene showing Gaga crossing a bridge with a rainbow in the sky. She believed it to portray Joanne crossing into the afterlife. "What an amazing tribute — so beautiful and raw", Becker concluded. W magazine's Evelyn Wang commended Gaga for releasing a music video of an already old song, and noted how the clip was a "far cry from the psychedelic grindhouse bacchanalia of 'John Wayne', [and] is a stripped-down, folksy walk through the woods... Since 'Joanne' is a raw, emotional ballad, and the piano version of it even more so, the camera refuses to stray from the catharsis happening on Gaga's face." Megan Reynolds from Jezebel agreed with Wang, described the video as "soft and quietly sweet" and added that "Gaga gives us the best version of herself" in the clip.

== Live performances ==
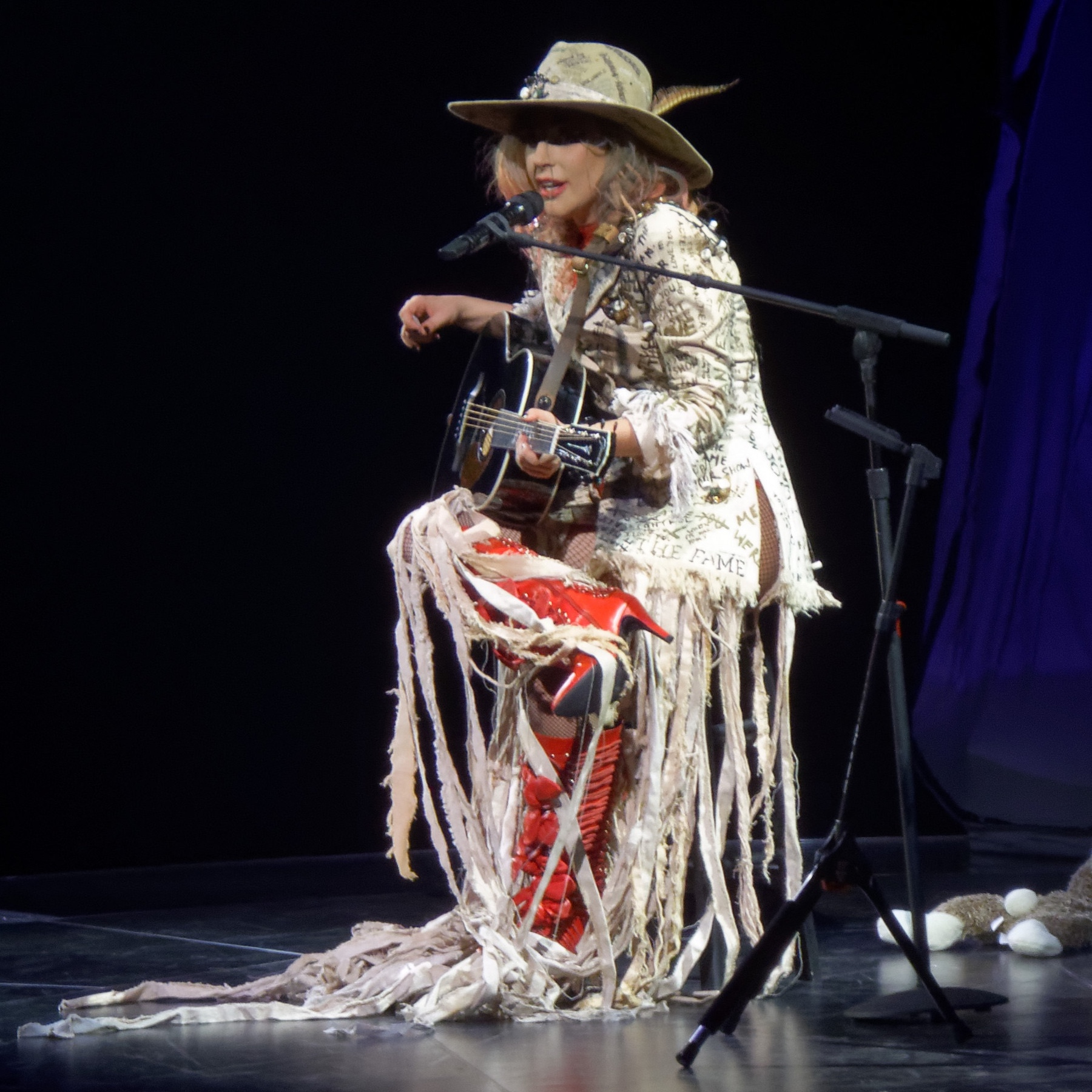
Gaga playing a guitar while performing the song on the Joanne World Tour

"Joanne"'s first public appearance was on October 21, 2016, in a 15-second Budweiser commercial showing Gaga dancing in a dive bar and singing the track. The advertisement was promoting her then-upcoming Dive Bar Tour, a brief three-date promotional tour of U.S. dive bars, where the track was performed. The next performance of the song took place on the television show News Zero in Japan. The song was part of Gaga's Joanne World Tour (2017–2018), where she performed it while sitting down and playing a guitar engraved with the name "Joanne". During the sequence, Gaga was wearing a fringe blazer and a wide-brimmed hat. Tom Murray of the Edmonton Journal said that the track was "the naked, emotional core of the show".

At the 60th Annual Grammy Awards, Gaga performed the song along with "Million Reasons". She was joined on stage by Ronson who played guitar, while the singer played the piano. The instrument was covered by large, illuminated angel wings. Before the performance, the singer dedicated the song to her late aunt and said: "This is for love and compassion. Even when you can’t understand." Writing for E! News, Vanessa Jackson said that "Lady Gaga always finds a way to bring the house down whenever she performs", and called the performance "powerful and heartbreaking". Maria Pasquini from People thought that the performance of "Joanne" was "stirring".

In 2025, Gaga included a piano rendition of "Joanne" at select shows of The Mayhem Ball tour. Before performing the song at her first concert in Assago, Italy, Gaga expressed pride in her Italian heritage and said she was dedicating it to her grandmother in gratitude for everything she had done. On October 31, 2025, in Barcelona, she again dedicated the song to her grandmother, and shared with the audience that she had passed away earlier in the month.

== Media appearance ==
"Joanne" was featured in the documentary film, Gaga: Five Foot Two, which chronicled the recording of the eponymous album and the singer's life. In one of the scenes, Gaga and her father visit her grandmother, so that she can listen to the track about Joanne. Gaga's father is "overcome with emotion, [and] steps out of the room during the visit", and her grandmother reassures the singer that she "got it right" with the song. Spencer Kornhaber of The Atlantic named it "the most memorable scene of the documentary". Bonnie Stiernberg of Billboard said that "the film reaches an apex during [this] key scene", calling it "an intimate single-camera shot that moves from Gaga's grandmother's face to her father to Gaga, who plays the song on her cellphone". Leslie Helperin of The Hollywood Reporter described the scene as "fascinating", adding that "[Gaga's] grandmother seems resistant to all this emotional hyperbole, insisting that the loss is well in the past now."

== Credits and personnel ==
These credits are adapted from the liner notes of Joanne.

=== Management ===
- Recorded at Shangri-La Studios (Malibu, California) and Pink Duck Studios (Burbank, California)
- Mixed at Electric Lady Studios (New York City, New York)
- Mastered at Sterling Sound Studios (New York City, New York)
- Published by Sony/ATV Songs LLC, House of Gaga Publishing (BMI) and Imagem CV/Songs of Zelig (BMI) (Songs of Zelig administered worldwide by Imagem CV)

=== Album version ===
- Lady Gaga – songwriter, lead vocals, producer, percussion
- Mark Ronson – songwriter, producer, bass, guitars, keyboards, Mellotron
- BloodPop – producer, keyboards, rhythm track
- Harper Simon – guitars
- Dave Russell – recording
- Joshua Blair – recording
- Justin Smith – recording
- David "Squirrel" Covell – recording assistant
- Johnnie Burik – recording assistant
- Tom Elmhirst – audio mixing
- Joe Visciano – mixing assistant
- Brandon Bost – mixing assistant
- Tom Coyne – mastering
- Randy Merrill – mastering

=== Piano version ===
Credits adapted from iTunes Store.

- Lady Gaga – songwriter, lead vocals, producer
- Mark Ronson – songwriter
- Paul "DJ White Shadow" Blair – producer
- Nick Monson – producer
- Mark Nilan Jr. – producer, piano
- Benjamin Rice – audio mixing

== Charts ==
Weekly chart performance for "Joanne"
Chart (2016–2018)	Peak position
France (SNEP)	190
Scottish Singles Sales (Official Charts)	58
UK Singles (Official Charts Company)	154

Weekly chart performance for "Joanne (Where Do You Think You're Goin'?)"
Chart (2018)	Peak position
Canadian Digital Songs (Billboard)	48
Greece Digital (IFPI)	82
Hungary (Single Top 40)	10
Spanish Digital (PROMUSICAE)	14
US Digital Song Sales (Billboard)	50

== Release history ==
Release dates and formats for "Joanne"
Region	Date	Format(s)	Version	Label	Ref.
Italy	December 22, 2017	Radio airplay	Original	Universal	
Various	January 26, 2018	Digital download; streaming	Piano	Interscope	
