= Heather Parry =

American film producer

- Born: 1971 (age 54–55); Macungie, Pennsylvania, U.S.
- Education: Colorado State University
- Occupations: TV and film producer
- Years active: 1993–present
- Known for: Pixels (2015), The House Bunny (2008), A Star Is Born (2018)

Heather Parry (born 1971) is an American television and film producer. She is best known for Pixels (2015), The House Bunny (2008), and A Star Is Born (2018).

== Background and early career ==
Parry was born in 1971, in Macungie, Pennsylvania. She attended and graduated from Emmaus High School in Emmaus, Pennsylvania in 1989. Parry graduated from Colorado State University at Fort Collins, Colorado. While a graduate student at Colorado State University, Parry began her career in the entertainment industry with an internship on The Dennis Miller Show.

== Career ==
=== MTV (1993–2005) ===
Parry was the West Coast Bureau Chief for MTV News from 1993 until 2005. In 2005, she co-produced Get Rich or Die Tryin’ starring 50 Cent and The Longest Yard starring Adam Sandler for MTV Films.

=== Happy Madison Productions (2005–2015) ===
From 2005 until 2015, Parry was head of film development and production at Happy Madison Productions, founded by Adam Sandler, and produced four movies for the company, The House Bunny in 2008, Just Go with It in 2011, That's My Boy in 2012, and Pixels in 2015.

=== Live Nation Productions (2015–2019) ===
In December 2015, Parry was named president of film and television production at Live Nation, where she oversaw production of four documentaries, Eagles of Death Metal: Nos Amis (Our Friends), Can’t Stop Won’t Stop: A Bad Boy Story and Gaga: Five Foot Two (all in 2017) and Believer in 2018.

In December 2018, Parry was placed on leave by Live Nation following publication of an exposé by Variety, reporting results of a four-month long investigation into her alleged workplace abuse and verbal harassment toward employees. Live Nation hired an outside firm, Paul Hastings LLP, to conduct an internal investigation. On February 21, 2019, Parry was fired from Live Nation Productions.

== Awards and recognition ==
- Believer was nominated for an Emmy Award for Outstanding Arts and Culture Documentary. It also won Best Documentary at the 30th GLAAD Media Awards.
- In 2018, Parry received the Hermes Platinum Award for two documentaries, Can't Stop, Won't Stop: A Bad Boy Story, which she shared with Daniel Kaufman (director) and Sean Combs (producer), and Gaga: Five Foot Two, shared with Chris Moukarbel (director), Lady Gaga (producer), and Bobby Campbell (producer).
- Parry was a producer on Can’t Stop Won’t Stop: A Bad Boy Story, which won a Hollywood Documentary Award at the Hollywood Film Awards in 2017.

== Filmography ==
Year	Title	Role	Notes
2019	Believer	Producer	
2018	A Star Is Born	Executive Producer	
2018	The After Party	Executive Producer	
2017	Gaga: Five Foot Two	Producer	Documentary
2017	Can't Stop, Won't Stop: A Bad Boy Story	Producer	Documentary
2017	Eagles of Death Metal: Nos Amis (Our Friends)	Producer	Documentary
2015	The Ridiculous 6	Executive Producer	
2015	Pixels	Executive Producer	
2012	That's My Boy	Producer	
2011	Just Go with It	Producer	
2008	The House Bunny	Producer	
2005	Get Rich or Die Tryin'	Co-Producer	
2005	The Longest Yard	Co-Producer	
2003	MTV Album Launch	Executive Producer - 1 episode	Television Series
2003	Limp Bizkit	Executive Producer	
2002	Movie House	Producer	Television Series
2002	'Til Death Do Us Part: Carmen and Dave	Supervising Producer	Television Movie Documentary
2001	Rage Against the Machine: The Battle of Mexico City	Producer	Video Documentary
1997	Rage Against the Machine	Producer: Live in Concert	Video Documentary
1995	"The Ghost of Tom Joad", Rage Against the Machine	Producer	Music Video
1994	Freaks, Nerds & Weirdos	Field Producer	Television Movie
