= A-Yo (Lady Gaga song) =

2016 promotional single by Lady Gaga

Promotional single by Lady Gaga

from the album Joanne
- Released: October 18, 2016
- Recorded: 2016
- Studio: Electric Lady (New York City); Shangri-La (Malibu); Pink Duck (Burbank); GenPop Laboratory (Los Angeles)
- Genre: Country pop
- Length: 3:27
- Label: Interscope
- Songwriters: Stefani Germanotta; Hillary Lindsey; Mark Ronson; Michael Tucker
- Producers: Mark Ronson; BloodPop; Lady Gaga

"A-Yo" is a song recorded by American singer Lady Gaga for her fifth studio album, Joanne (2016). It was released to Zane Lowe's Beats 1 radio show on October 18, 2016, as the record's second promotional single by Interscope Records. Gaga co-wrote and co-produced the song with Mark Ronson and BloodPop, with Hillary Lindsey being the additional songwriter. A funky, electro-tinged and rock-inspired upbeat country pop track, "A-Yo" lyrically delves on leaving behind haters.

Critical reception towards "A-Yo" was positive and the song entered the record charts of multiple countries, including reaching a peak of number 66 on United States' Billboard Hot 100. To promote the track's release, Gaga performed it on concert venues of her Dive Bar Tour and on television shows. It was later added to her set list at the Victoria's Secret Fashion Show 2016, the 2017 Coachella Valley Music and Arts Festival and the Joanne World Tour (2017–2018).

== Background and release ==
Following the release of "Perfect Illusion", the lead single from her fifth studio album Joanne, on September 9, 2016, Lady Gaga announced the Dive Bar Tour, a promotional concert series where the singer performed at various dive bars in the United States. The venues for the concert series remained undisclosed to have a more intimate approach. The campaign was sponsored by Bud Light, and premiered on October 5, 2016. Simultaneously, a live broadcast of the event was streamed on Bud Light's official Facebook page. On October 2, 2016, several publications claimed that during the first show of the tour, new songs would be sung.

Singer-songwriter Hillary Lindsey, who previously had experiences in writing country songs in Nashville, was identified by Interscope Records as a potential collaborator on Joanne. The label's A&R Aaron Bay-Schuck, who had heard the initial Joanne material, introduced Gaga and Lindsey. During the Dive Bar Tour, Gaga recalled that she and Lindsey were seated in couches and having a back-and-forth conversation with guitar and piano. They bonded over drinks and Gaga also played initial demos of some of the tracks she had written. Lindsey remembered that Gaga's personal experiences and stories resulted in many ideas for songs, including "A-Yo". On her Twitter account, Gaga clarified that the track was about different things like cigarettes, one's enemies as well as having sex, expanding with the message: "Leavin ur haters in the dust is a sexy feelin, drag em' like a smoke, leave ur blazin' tracks in the road #AYO".

"A-Yo" was originally planned as the album's second single, but another track, "Million Reasons", was chosen due to the latter's commercial success. "A-Yo" premiered on Zane Lowe's Beats 1 radio show on October 18, 2016, and was made available for digital download and streaming. She posted a link to the song on her Twitter account, while responding to Alex Pall of The Chainsmokers's dismissal of "Perfect Illusion", writing "maybe u guys'll like this 1 better [sic]". The single's cover art features Gaga topless and covering her chest with her hand, wearing a feathered hat that hides her eyes.

== Recording and composition ==
"A-Yo" was written and produced by Gaga with Mark Ronson and BloodPop, with Lindsey as an additional co-writer. It was recorded at Electric Lady Studios in New York City by Benjamin Rice who was assisted by Barry McCready. Joshua Blair continued the additional recording for the track at Shangri-La Studios, Malibu, California with David "Squirrel" Covell, and also at Pink Duck Studios in Burbank, California, assisted by Justin Smith. The mixing for "A-Yo" was performed by Serban Ghenea at MixStar Studios, Virginia Beach, Virginia, with engineering for the mix by Josh Hanes. Other instrumentation for "A-Yo" included guitars and percussion by Gaga, bass and guitars by Mark Ronson, and synthesizer and organ by BloodPop. Tom Coyne and Randy Merrill completed the audio mastering at Sterling Sound Studios in New York City.

"A-Yo" is a funky, "electro-tinged" and "rock-inspired" song. Yahoo! described "A-Yo as a country rock track, while Rolling Stone regarded it as an upbeat country pop song. According to the sheet music published at Musicnotes.com, "A-Yo" is written in the key of A major in common time with a tempo of 150 beats per minute. The chords alternate between A_{7} and D_{7}, and Gaga's vocals span two octaves from E_{3} to E_{5}. Michelle Lulic from Bustle felt that the lyrics seem to describe "things getting hot-and-heavy in her car": "I can't wait to rev you up /Faster than you can say "Ferrari" /Tearin' up the gravel, watching you unravel /Now it's a party". During the chorus, Gaga sings "A-Yo, A-Yo, we smokin' 'em all", emphasizing her explanation about "leaving your haters in the dust".

== Critical reception ==
Tricia Gilbride from Mashable called "A-Yo" "ridiculously catchy" and "a futuristic country-rock song egging you on to have a good time over guitar solos and digital beats". Bustle's Michelle Lulic noted that "this may just be one of Lady Gaga's most simplistic yet most visual songs yet" and thanks to its repetitive chorus, it was "near impossible not to start singing by the time you get to the end of your first listen of the song". Larry Bartleet of British magazine NME commented that "the transformation might grate on fans of Gaga's past few albums of pop, but from these lyrics it looks like on fifth album 'Joanne' she really doesn't care what people think". Andy Gill from The Independent complimented Josh Homme's "spiky but fluid breaks" on songs like "A-Yo" and "John Wayne", which were "undoubted album highlights". Daniel Welsh from The Huffington Post said that "A-Yo" sounded like a cross between "Manicure" from Artpop and "Americano" from Born This Way, but with touches of country. He went on to compliment Gaga for pulling off "perfecly" her wish of Joanne having a "dive bar feel" with the song.

Stereogum's Chris DeVille wrote, "Despite its funky digital beat, rap-inflected hook, and playfully tweaked guitar twang, it might actually go over pretty well on country radio if enough programmers gave it a chance. That said, this computerized juke-joint party track is far from M.O.R. by Nashville standards". Kristen S. Hé of Vulture found it a "fun" and "unpretentious" song, where Gaga is "having the time of her life — the perfect embodiment of her raucous, back-to-basics 2016 Dive Bar Tour." Carey O'Donnell from Paper magazine called it a "foot stomping, hand-clapping rock pop track", but said it sounded better live. Stephen Thomas Erlewine from AllMusic called the song "riotous". The New York Times's Jon Caramanica felt that "A-Yo" sounded like "a Britney Spears parody or a song drawn from one of those live musicals that have been littering network television" since Glee ended. Maeve McDermott of USA Today was negative, saying "songs that sound most like Gaga's earlier hits" like "A-Yo" were Joanne's weakest moments.

== Chart performance ==
In the United States, "A-Yo" reached number-one on the Billboard Twitter Real-Time chart following the release of Joanne. On the Billboard Hot 100 it debuted and peaked at number 66. On the Canadian Hot 100, "A-Yo" reached number 55. Similarly, in the United Kingdom the song reached number 66 on the UK Singles Chart, selling 8,332 equivalent units, and debuted with around the same numbers in Ireland and Scotland. Other European countries where the song debuted includes France, Portugal and Switzerland, and the digital charts of Czech Republic and Slovakia.

As of February 2020, the song has sold 5,500 digital downloads and acquired 6.47 million streams in the UK.

== Live performances ==
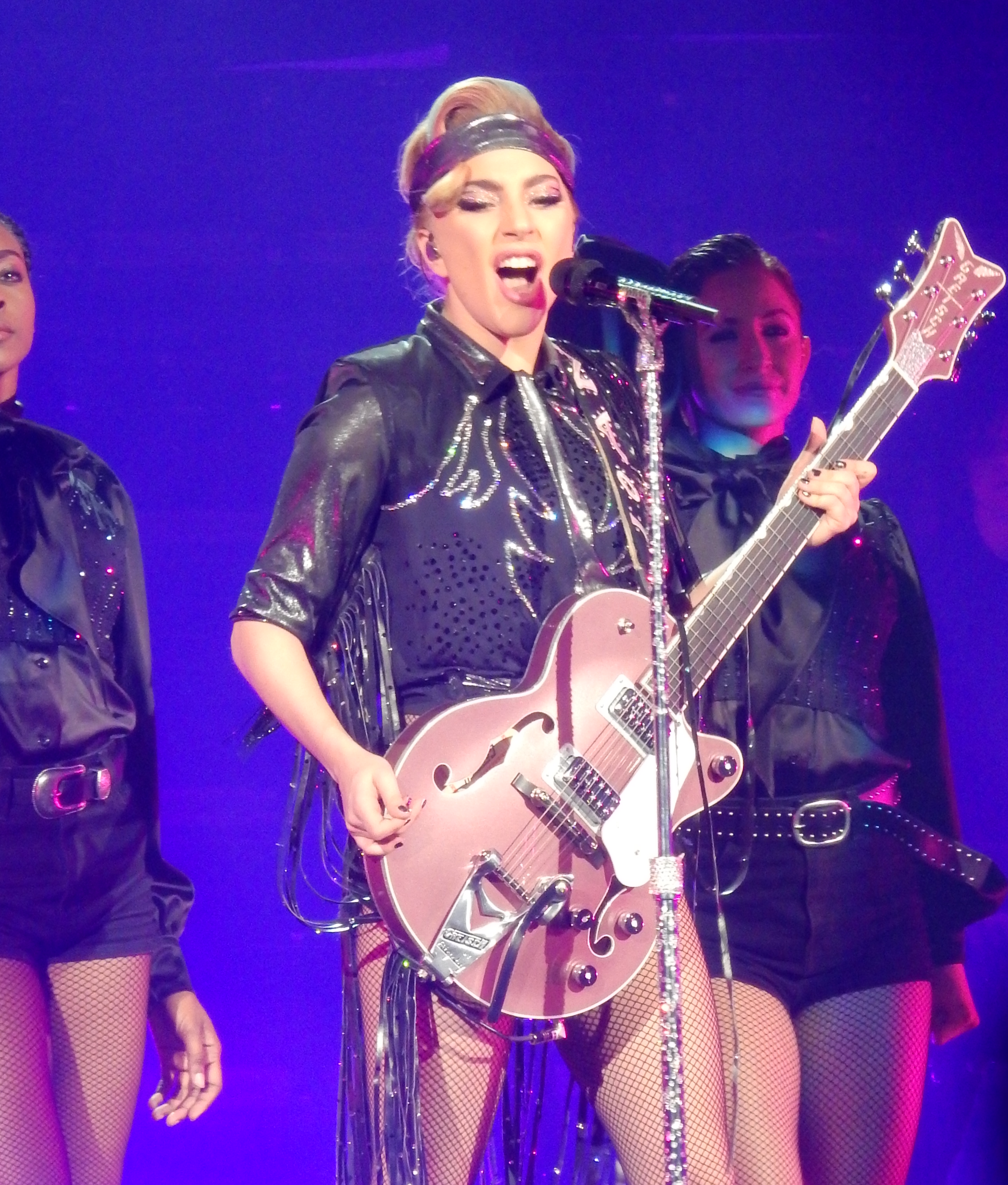
Gaga performing "A-Yo" during the Joanne World Tour, in 2018

Gaga first performed "A-Yo" on the Dive Bar Tour, a brief three-date promotional tour of U.S. dive bars, with Mark Ronson accompanying her by playing guitar during her performance in The Bitter End (New York City) and The Satellite (Los Angeles). She performed "A-Yo" live on network television along with "Million Reasons", as a musical guest on Saturday Night Live dated October 22, 2016. For "A-Yo", Ronson again assisted Gaga by playing guitar, and the singer did a honky-tonk and go-go dancing inspired performance. Rolling Stone's Daniel Kreps described it as intense singing, with Gaga "feverishly dancing and wildly shredding on her guitar". Paste's Chris White called Gaga an "incredible performer and vocalist" based on the performances, adding that she "understands the stagecraft of playing live music on [the SNL stage]".

Three days later, Gaga appeared on The Late Late Show with James Corden on CBS Television City studios, and delivered the opening monologue, while also performing "A-Yo". The same month she performed "A-Yo" during the Victoria's Secret Fashion Show, while wearing a glittering, black catsuit.

Gaga next performed "A-Yo" during her set at the 2017 Coachella Festival. While singing she played a special guitar, which was in wireless connection with her phone, allowing her to change its colour during the performance. "A-Yo" was performed as the second song on the Joanne World Tour (2017–2018) shows, where she again played the guitar. She wore a black bejeweled fringe leotard, often complimented with a crystallized hat for the performance.

== Credits and personnel ==
Credits adapted from the liner notes of Joanne.

=== Management ===
- Recorded at Electric Lady Studios (New York City), Shangri-La Studios (Malibu, California), Pink Duck Studios (Burbank, California) and GenPop Laboratory (Los Angeles, California)
- Mixed at MixStar Studios (Virginia Beach, Virginia)
- Sony/ATV Songs, LLC/ House of Gaga Publishing, LLC (BMI), BIRB Music (ASCAP) All Rights Administered by BMG Rights Management (US) LLC, Imagem CV/Songs Of Zelig (BMI), OWSLA Music Publishing, LLC/Check Your Pulse, LLC (ASCAP)

=== Personnel ===
- Lady Gaga – songwriter, lead vocals, producer, guitars, percussion
- Mark Ronson – songwriter, producer, bass, guitars
- BloodPop – songwriter, producer, synthesizer, organ, rhythm track
- Hillary Lindsey – songwriter
- Thomas Brenneck – guitars
- Josh Homme – guitars
- Dave Guy – trumpet
- Este Haim – percussion
- Ian Hendrickson-Smith – baritone saxophone
- J. Gastelum Cochemea – tenor saxophone
- Benjamin Rice – recording
- Joshua Blair – recording
- David "Squirrel" Covell – recording assistance
- Justin Smith – recording assistance
- Barry McCready – recording assistance
- Serban Ghenea – mixing
- John Hanes – mix engineering
- Tom Coyne – mastering
- Randy Merrill – mastering

== Charts ==
Weekly chart performance for "A-Yo"
Chart (2016)	Peak position
Canada Hot 100 (Billboard)	55
Czech Republic Airplay (ČNS IFPI)	93
Czech Republic Singles Digital (ČNS IFPI)	56
France (SNEP)	167
Ireland (IRMA)	67
New Zealand Heatseekers (RMNZ)	3
Portugal (AFP)	92
Scottish Singles Sales (Official Charts)	55
Slovakia Singles Digital (ČNS IFPI)	58
Switzerland (Schweizer Hitparade)	62
UK Singles (Official Charts)	66
US Billboard Hot 100	66
Venezuela English (Record Report)	42

== Certifications and sales ==
Certifications and sales for "A-Yo"
Region	Certification	Certified units/sales
Brazil (Pro-Música Brasil)	Gold	30,000^{‡}
^{‡} Sales+streaming figures based on certification alone.
