= Believer (2018 American film) =

- Promotional poster
- Directed by: Don Argott
- Produced by: Sheena M. Joyce; Heather Parry; Robert Reynolds
- Cinematography: Anton Floquet
- Edited by: Demian Fenton
- Music by: Hans Zimmer
- Release dates: January 20, 2018 (2018 Sundance Film Festival); June 25, 2018 (HBO)
- Running time: 101 minutes
- Country: United States
- Language: English

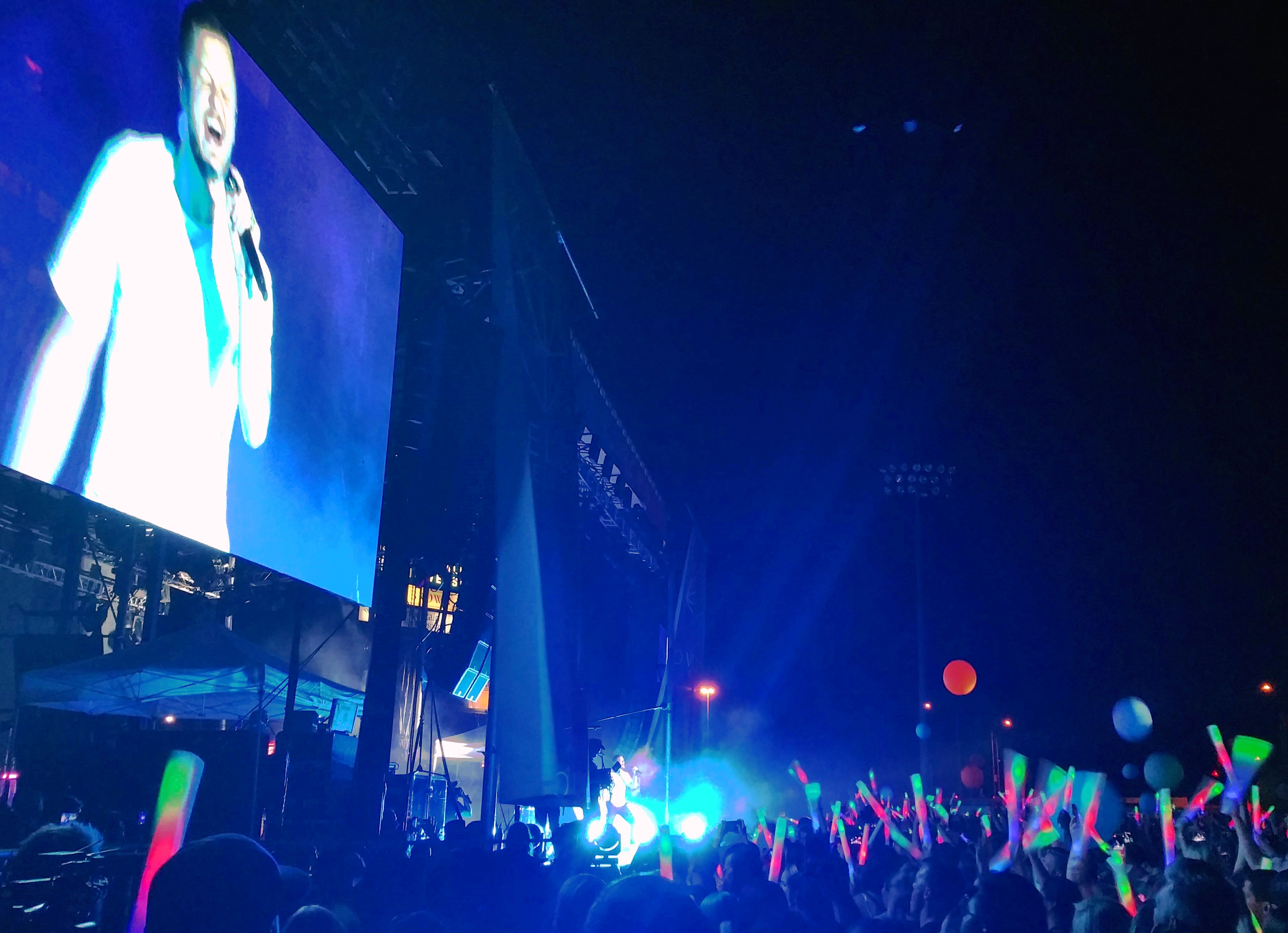
Believer focuses on Dan Reynolds of Imagine Dragons and the 2017 Utah LoveLoud Fest dedicated to LGBTQ+ youth.

Believer is a 2018 American documentary that examines the intersection between LGBT people and the Church of Jesus Christ of Latter-day Saints (LDS Church) through the eyes of Dan Reynolds, lead singer of pop rock band Imagine Dragons. It focuses on his efforts to organize the LOVELOUD Festival in Orem, Utah in support of Utah LGBTQ youth.

Filming took place in Salt Lake City and Orem, as well as New York City and Las Vegas, where Reynolds was born in 1987. The film's music was composed by Hans Zimmer. Also, Reynolds wrote two songs for the film. In January 2018, it was announced that HBO Documentary Films secured US distribution rights to the film.

The LDS Church released a statement just 10 days before the 2017 LOVELOUD event, supporting the effort "to foster a community of inclusion in which no one is mistreated because of who they are or what they believe."

== Cast ==
- Dan Reynolds
- Aja Volkman
- Ben McKee
- Daniel Platzman
- Wayne Sermon
- Tyler Glenn
- Savannah Skyler

== Awards ==
Believer won the GLAAD Media Award for Outstanding Documentary at the 30th GLAAD Media Awards. It was nominated for an Emmy Award for Outstanding Arts and Culture Documentary at the 40th News and Documentary Emmy Awards.

== See also ==
- Homosexuality and The Church of Jesus Christ of Latter-day Saints
- LGBT Mormon suicides
