= Dive Bar Tour (Lady Gaga) =

2016 concert tour by Lady Gaga

- Promotional tour by Lady Gaga
- Promotional poster
- Location: United States
- Associated album: Joanne
- Start date: October 5, 2016
- End date: October 27, 2016
- Legs: 1
- No. of shows: 3

Lady Gaga concert chronology
- Cheek to Cheek Tour (2014–2015); Dive Bar Tour (2016); Joanne World Tour (2017–2018)

The Dive Bar Tour was a promotional concert tour by American singer Lady Gaga, sponsored by American lager brand Bud Light, in support of her fifth studio album, Joanne (2016). The tour visited three dive bars in the United States on the 5, 20 and 27 of October in 2016. Gaga aspired to perform her new songs in a more intimate environment than her previous tours, which took place in arenas and stadiums, believing the small bars captured the "raw Americana vibe" of Joanne. During her gigs, Gaga debuted numerous songs from her then-upcoming album, and shared personal stories with the audience. Journalists appreciated the tour for its simplicity and found it emotional. All shows were live streamed on Bud Light's Facebook page.

== Background and development ==
On October 21, 2016, Lady Gaga released her fifth studio album, Joanne, which marked her return to pop music after 2014's Cheek to Cheek, a collaborative jazz record with Tony Bennett. It was largely inspired by her aunt Joanne Stefani Germanotta, who died at age 19 due to complications arising from lupus. Joanne was described as Gaga's first album which dipped into such genres as soft rock and country. Before its release, Gaga announced teaming up with American lager brand Bud Light to perform songs from it in front of very small crowds in dive bars across the United States, marking the "new chapter in her career". She believed that the venues would accentuate the "raw Americana vibe" of her upcoming album.

"My first performances were in dive bars in New York City and around the country, so working with Bud Light to go back to my roots to perform songs from my new album Joanne is such an exciting way to connect with my fans and share this music with them for the first time".

— Gaga talking about the tour in a press release

Gaga aimed to be close enough to her audience to be able to look into their eyes while performing, "to have a more natural human experience" with them, something which was not possible on her stadium and arena shows. She later further elaborated on her decision to give stipped-down performances after her numerous tours involving "massive" productions and multiple costume changes, saying: "It's not so much about taking it all off for the sake of it, like, 'Here I am, I had all these costumes before and now I don't!' But to begin all of this, we're going to wind back the clock – to the day I decided when I was 19 that I was going to go live the rest of the life that Joanne didn't get to live."

Gaga and Bud Light's collaboration was advertised with a number of TV spots, which included snippets of previously not heard tracks from the new album. Prior the tour, it was reported that the audience would be made up of winners of an unknown contest, and all shows would be live streamed on Bud Light's Facebook page. The locations of the shows were kept a secret, and passes were given to the selected audience members only shortly before each show took place, to avoid large groups of people turning up, who wouldn't be able to fit into the small clubs. The Dive Bar Tour visited three bars in Nashville, New York City and Los Angeles, on 5, 20 and 27 of October 2016, respectively. According to People, hearing impaired people representing the group Not Impossible were invited to the first concert, in Nashville, who were introduced to a "groundbreaking technology" that included "a custom vest, wristbands and ankle bands that vibrated in time with the music." In addition, all songs were performed in sign language by famed interpreter Amber Gallego.

In June 2017, Gaga announced to revive the tour for an additional concert the following month. The show, intended to take place in a Las Vegas bar, was later indefinitely postponed and then cancelled because of scheduling conflicts due to rehearsals for the Joanne World Tour (2017–2018). For Bud Light, Gaga's shows marked the beginning of further Dive Bar Tour gigs in similar small venues with other artists, such as John Mayer, G-Eazy, and Post Malone.

== Concert synopsis ==
For her Nashville show, at The 5 Spot, Gaga took the stage in a black and gold jacket and a pink hat with matching rhinestone-bedecked hat band. She sat down and started performing "Sinner's Prayer" while strumming an acoustic-guitar, before her band started to play their instruments. For "A-Yo", she stood up and played an electric guitar. After asking the audience to call her Joanne for the night, she invited Hillary Lindsey on stage, with whom she co-wrote two songs for the Joanne album. They then performed "Million Reasons" together, as the track's live premier. For the final song, "Perfect Illusion", Gaga removed the hat and jacket, and danced around the stage in a crop top, while whipping her ponytail around.

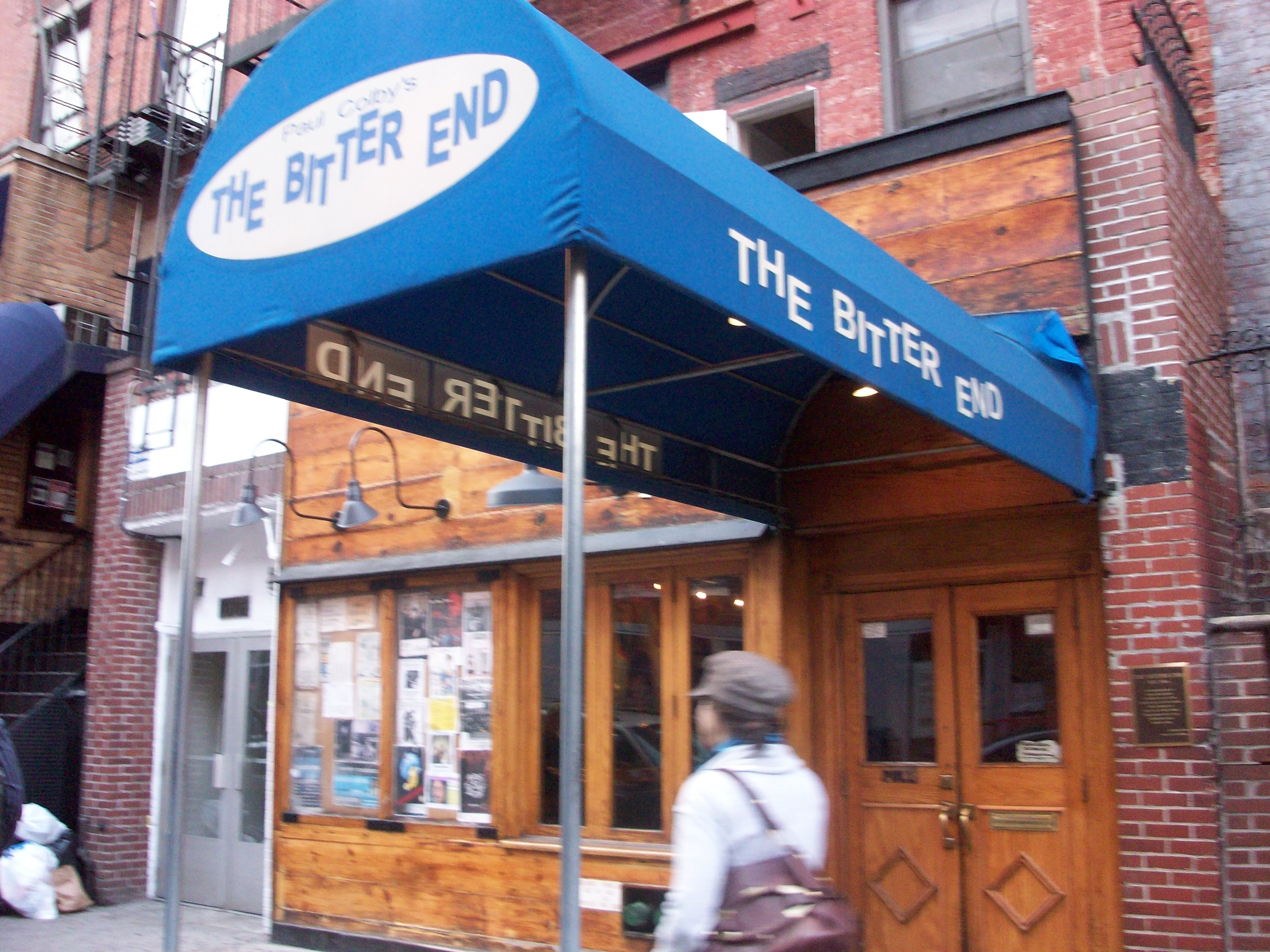
Gaga's second stop of the tour was at New York City's The Bitter End, where she also gave a spontaneous performance on the venue's rooftop after her main set ended.

At The Bitter End, in New York City, Gaga donned a see-through shirt, emblazoned with the logo of tour sponsor Bud Light, and jean shorts. After debuting the track "Diamond Heart", she invited Mark Ronson on stage, who served as Joanne's co-executive producer. They performed "A-Yo" together, with both of them playing electric guitar. Gaga then shared the story of her late aunt Joanne with the audience, and how her death impacted her family. She performed the song named after her while playing acoustic guitar, and dedicated it to her father. She called Lindsey on stage, telling the public how they wrote the following song, "Grigio Girls", together. Gaga then dedicated it to her friend, Sonja, who was battling cancer and was present in the audience. "Million Reasons" and "Just Another Day" were performed with Gaga playing a piano. After the concert was over, Gaga went on to the roof of the bar using the fire escape, where she reprised "Joanne" and sang "Angel Down" to the crowd standing outside, who were unable to get in due to the limited capacity of the venue.

The final show in Los Angeles's the Satellite started with Gaga walking through the audience with two of her dancers while performing "Come to Mama". They were dressed in matching jackets with two letters written on each of them, which made up the word Joanne when they stood next to each other. After performing "A-Yo", for which she was again joined on stage by Ronson, Gaga debuted the new song "John Wayne". She then thanked her global audience for purchasing the track "Million Reasons" and performed it. After giving a speech about the importance of love and respect, she sang "Angel Down" and changed its lyrics to reference shooting victim Trayvon Martin in the outro of the song. Talking about her family led to a performance of "Joanne". Before singing the final song, "Perfect Illusion", Gaga changed into a white crop top and denim shorts. During the performance, she crowd-surfed and poured beer onto her head.

== Critical reception ==
Reviewing Gaga's Nashville performance, Jewly Hight of Billboard opined that the Dive Bar Tour is "a return to her humble performing roots" and an "experiment with transforming how she presents her music and herself." She added that "judging from Wednesday's show, Gaga's latest reinvention has her embracing emotional directness, and coming from her, that too packs a punch."

After attending the show at New York City, Vanity Fair's Yohana Desta wrote that "the show featured some of Gaga's best characteristics: strong vocals, dedicated performance, coaxed emotions (she seemed to tear up at certain parts of the night, inspiring some fans to tear up too)." She highlighted her performance of "Just Another Day", "in which the singer hammed it up behind the piano, resting her foot on the instrument in a trademark move", and Gaga's impromptu performance on the bar's roof as the most memorable parts of the show.

LA Weekly's Eve Barlow reviewed the concert in Los Angeles, and called it "bonkers" to watch "one of the world's biggest superstars in a room with just 300 people", and appreciated the opportunity to get to see her up close, which was not possible with her stadium-sized shows. She added that "her set runs through emotions the way musicals move through scenes", while believing that "at the age of 30 she seems to have left some of the poses of her 20s behind, [...] she remains pure theater, a one-woman Annie Get Your Gun."

== Set lists ==
=== Nashville ===
1. "Sinner's Prayer"
2. "A-Yo"
3. "Million Reasons"
4. "Perfect Illusion"

=== New York City ===
1. "Diamond Heart"
2. "A-Yo"
3. "Joanne"
4. "Grigio Girls"
5. "Million Reasons"
6. "Just Another Day"

Note: After the performance, Gaga reprised "Joanne" and performed "Angel Down" on the roof of the bar to the crowd outside.

=== Los Angeles ===
1. "Come to Mama"
2. "A-Yo"
3. "John Wayne"
4. "Million Reasons"
5. "Angel Down"
6. "Joanne"
7. "Perfect Illusion"

== Shows ==
List of concerts, showing date, city, country, and venue
Date	City	Country	Venue
North America
October 5, 2016	Nashville	United States	The 5 Spot
October 20, 2016	New York City	United States	The Bitter End
October 27, 2016	Los Angeles	United States	The Satellite

=== Cancelled shows ===
List of cancelled concerts, showing date, city, country and reason for cancellation
Date	City	Country	Reason
July 13, 2017	Las Vegas	United States	Scheduling conflicts due to Joanne World Tour rehearsals
July 26, 2017	Los Angeles	United States	Scheduling conflicts due to Joanne World Tour rehearsals
August 30, 2017	New Orleans	United States	Scheduling conflicts due to Joanne World Tour rehearsals
