= John Wayne (song) =

Song by Lady Gaga

from the album Joanne
- Studio: Shangri-La, Dragonfly (Malibu); Pink Duck (Burbank); Electric Lady (New York City)
- Genre: Pop rock
- Length: 2:55
- Label: Interscope
- Songwriters: Stefani Germanotta; Mark Ronson; Michael Tucker; Josh Homme
- Producers: Mark Ronson; BloodPop; Lady Gaga

Music video
- "John Wayne" on YouTube

"John Wayne" is a song recorded by American singer Lady Gaga, for her fifth studio album, Joanne (2016). Gaga co-wrote and co-produced the track with Mark Ronson and BloodPop, with additional writing from Josh Homme who also played guitar. "John Wayne" is a pop rock song that features elements of country, disco, funk, and house music. It derives its name from American actor John Wayne, who was known for his roles in Western films. The lyrics talk about Gaga's romantic craving for a wild, blue-collar man and smoking cannabis. Some critics felt that "John Wayne" might portray Gaga's relationship with her ex-fiancé Taylor Kinney.

Reviewers noted the song's tongue-in-cheek lyrics, and some of them criticized its musical composition. The song had minor chart placements in Hungary and the United Kingdom. Jonas Åkerlund directed the song's accompanying music video released on February 8, 2017, through Apple Music. It continues a storyline that started with the videos for singles "Perfect Illusion" and "Million Reasons", and portrays Gaga in different action-packed sequences. The clip received positive feedback for hearkening back to Gaga's older videos, and taking inspiration from action films. Gaga performed "John Wayne" as part of her set at the Victoria's Secret Fashion Show 2016, the 2017 Coachella Valley Music and Arts Festival, and at the Joanne World Tour (2017–2018).

== Recording and composition ==
Lady Gaga recorded "John Wayne" at four locations in the United States. She began recording at Shangri-La Studios, in Malibu, California, with Joshua Blair, assisted by David Covell. They also recorded the song at Pink Duck Studios in Burbank, California, with Justin Smith. He continued recording at Electric Lady Studios in New York City, assisted by Barry McCready. Recording concluded at Dragonfly Recording Studios, in Malibu, assisted by Charley Pollard. Tom Elmhirst mixed the song at Electric Lady Studios, with assistance from Joe Visciano and Brandon Bost. Other personnel included Mark Ronson, who played bass and guitar for the song, BloodPop, who processed the rhythm track and synthesizers and Josh Homme, who played drums and guitar. Homme added a guitar part to the song after Ronson reached out to him.

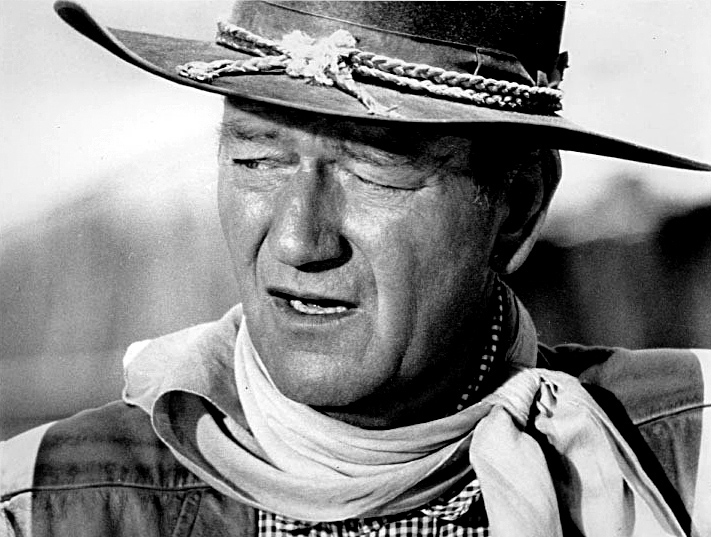
American actor John Wayne, the song's namesake, in 1961

"John Wayne" is composed in the key of B minor with a tempo of 92 beats per minute. Gaga's vocals span the nodes of A_{4} to D_{6}, and its chord progression follows a basic sequence of B_{5}–A_{5}–E–B_{5}–A_{5}.s It is a pop rock song, which has influences of other genres including country, disco, funk, and house music. According to Mikael Wood of the Los Angeles Times, classifying the genre of the song is difficult as it combines "tinny Euro-house synths, slowed-down funk drums and a boot-scooting bass line straight out of Nashville". The track has "tongue-in-cheek" lyrics, referring to a cowboy in the opening verse: "I just love a cowboy, I know it's bad, but I'm, like, can I just hang off the back of your horse and can you go a little faster?"

The track's lyrics allude to smoking cannabis, and dating working-class men from Republican states, rather than urban men. In an interview with Zane Lowe at Beats 1, Gaga revealed that with "John Wayne" she explored her constant need to chase wild men, and how she keeps getting "bored of the same old John". The song derives its title from John Wayne, an actor who starred in Western films. Sabienna Bowman of Bustle magazine felt that although Wayne did not have any connection with Gaga, his films served as the "perfect metaphor" for the song's protagonist and her craving for wild men. Rob Sheffield of Rolling Stone compared "John Wayne"'s lyrics with Paula Cole's "Where Have All the Cowboys Gone?" (1996); in the latter, Cole asks "Where is my John Wayne?" Andrew Unterberger of Billboard speculated that the lyrics, "He called, I cried, we broke," could relate to Gaga's breakup with her fiancé Taylor Kinney. Bustle's S. Atkinson noted that the song portrays an "intense, doomed relationship" comparable to Gaga and Kinney's; she concluded that the song is about Kinney, despite him being neither a blue-collar worker nor from a Republican state.

== Critical reception ==
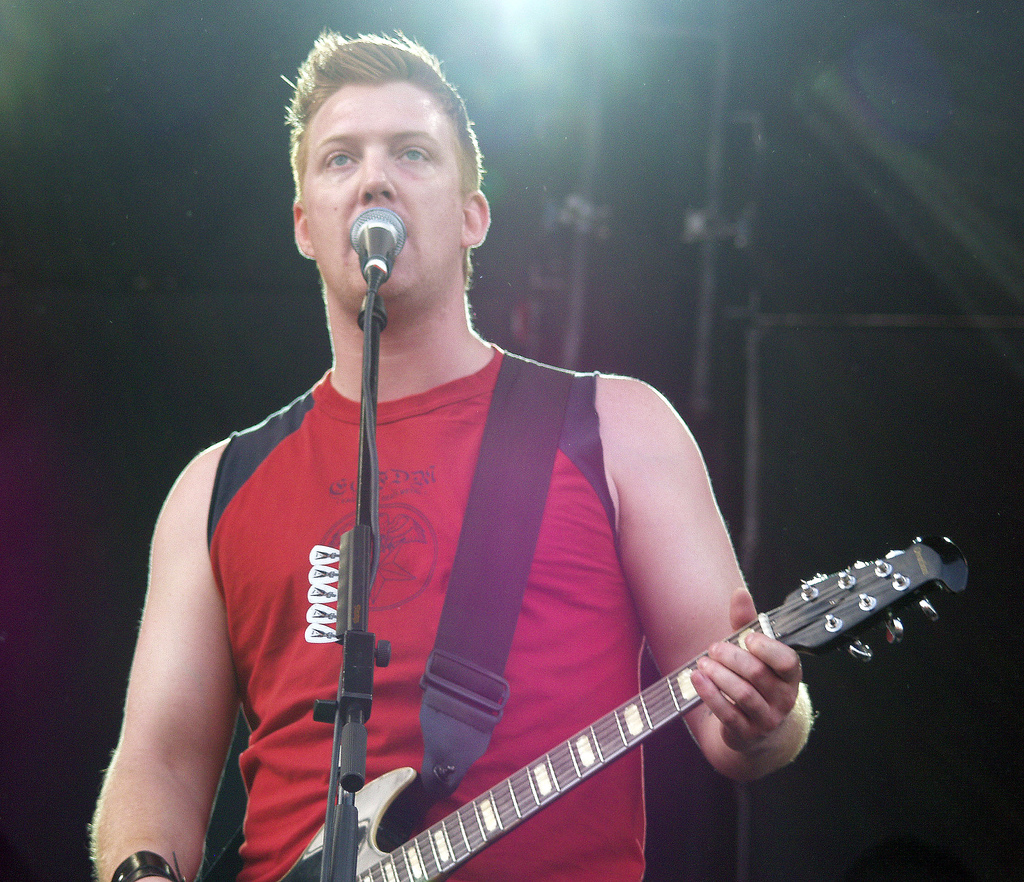
"John Wayne" was co-written by Josh Homme, who also played drums and guitar on the track.

While reviewing Joanne, The Atlantic's Spencer Kornhaber wrote that "John Wayne" was an indication of the musical direction the parent album could have gone, with Gaga's fascination with the Western genre. "When she screams 'go FASTER!' in the song's intro, it's one of the album's few examples of Gaga doing what Gaga got famous for, glorifying the extreme," he added. Similar thought was echoed by Andy Gill of The Independent, who found that the "more stolidly rockist fare" and "rock n' roll authenticity" that Gaga sought with Joanne, works best on "John Wayne" and "A-Yo". He believed Homme's "gritty riffing and imaginative lead lines," and "spiky but fluid breaks" made it one of the album highlights. Maeve McDermott of USA Today wrote that "Gaga proves she can still make pop songs that fit Joanne's twangier direction, nailing the balance" on "John Wayne", along with another song, "Diamond Heart", calling them "stadium-sized tracks that sound written with her huge Super Bowl halftime stage in mind".

Daniel Welsh of HuffPost was positive in his review of the track. He called it "one of the more important moments of Joanne, and a welcome relief". Welsh further described "John Wayne" as a stand-out of the album, and complimented Gaga's tongue-in-cheek references in the lyrics. Sal Cinquemani of Slant Magazine thought that "Gaga's fetishizing of blue-collar men as 'red-state treasure[s]' on 'John Wayne' is delivered with the same swagger she brandished on The Fame Monster's 'Teeth.'"

Mike Schiller of PopMatters had a negative view of "John Wayne" and gave it a 4/10 rating. He said the track has "lot of energy but [it] can't find a memorable melody to save its life". Scott Zuppardo of the same publication was dismissive of the song, writing, "Gaga makes more bubble gum pop, shocking!". Jezebel writer Bobby Finger called the song "silly", while Anna Gaca of Spin described it as "overstuffed". The Chicago Tribune's Greg Kot wrote that the song is an "embarrassing hoedown ... which piles on the bad-boy-goes-to-the-rodeo cliches". Mic writer Mathew Rodriguez felt that the song was a rehash of "4x4" (2013) by Miley Cyrus that "exposes how uncomfortable Gaga feels in her new persona". Time Out said that "John Wayne" took Joanne's country theme "too literally" and panned its title. Writing for Contactmusic.com, Eoin Hanlon said that "John Wayne" and another Joanne track, "Come to Mama", "are possibly some of the worst songs Gaga has ever released".

== Music video ==
=== Development and synopsis ===
Gaga performing her own stunts in the music video for "John Wayne". The image also shows part of the choreography similar to that in Michael Jackson's Thriller.

The song's music video, directed by Jonas Åkerlund, premiered on Apple Music on February 8, 2017. Gaga had previously worked with Åkerlund on the "Paparazzi" (2009) and "Telephone" (2010) music videos, and wanted to work with him again. She enlisted him to direct "John Wayne" thinking the song "perfect" for them to work on together. Gaga said, "[Åkerlund] got from me the visions on the song, like falling off the back of a horse but I hold on and carry on enjoying it, or a scene with a guy and me in a car and being reckless to see how reckless love can be. He has a very cinematic approach but doesn't forget to make it a music video".

Serial Pictures production company created the video with Violaine Etienne as executive producer, assisted by Scott Pourroy and Michel Waxman. Åkerlund was helped by Andy Coffing as first assistant director. Other personnel who worked on the video include: Par Ekberg as cinematographer, Emma Fairley as production designer, Matt Nee as the editor and Chimney Pot for the post-production scenes.

The "John Wayne" video begins with a clip from the end of the music video for "Million Reasons". Gaga wears her characteristic Joanne-era outfit: a pale pink suit and matching cowboy hat. Shortly after the video begins, she removes that clothing in favor of more-revealing cowgirl-inspired clothing. It continues with scenes of fast driving in cars and on motorcycles. The video cuts among a variety of exaggerated set pieces, and shots of Gaga dancing and singing. At the end of the video, Gaga is seen firing bullets from the heels of her thigh-high boots. The singer did her own stunts in most of the scenes, including jumping in high-heels from the top of a truck onto the cars.

=== Reception and analysis ===
Several critics noted that the video was comparable to Gaga's earlier music videos. Hunter Harris of New York magazine wrote that the video was "like something from Gaga's The Fame Monster or Born This Way (2011) eras". Andrew Unterberger of Billboard said that the music video for "John Wayne" was like the video for "'Telephone' ... if it used the Grindhouse double-bill as its primary Tarantino influence instead of Natural Born Killers". Kaitlyn Tiffany of The Verge considered the video an "entire B movie in under three minutes". She also felt the video was inspired by 1980s monster movies, the action film Mad Max (1979), as well as cowboy films starring Wayne. Tiffany compared the dance sequences to those in Michael Jackson's Thriller (1984), while another writer Lizzie Plaugic recommended watching the last sequences of the video, with all scenes mashed together.

Amy Phillips of Pitchfork wrote, "it's a return to the cheeky, fun maximalism of old Gaga videos", "there's a car chase, lots of fire, explosions, crazy costumes, and jokes. At one point, Gaga shoots bullets from her high heel"s. Time magazine's Raisa Bruner described the video's content as "return to peak Gaga": "shocking costumes, uninhibited group choreography and over-the-top stunt work for maximum visual impact". She gave the video's direction a positive review: "Gaga and Åkerlund aren't afraid to make the viewer uncomfortable and play with the destructive impacts of violence and passion, which is a good match for the masochism of the song". Spin's Anna Gaca wrote in her review of the video: "This Jonas Åkerlund-directed acid horror Western is a hell-on-wheels bad trip, jam-packed with neon lighting, vampy looks, and 'professional driver on a closed course' stunts". Gaca commented that the video was even more "overstuffed" than the song. At the 2017 Clio Awards, the clip was awarded the Silver Winner category for music videos.

== Live performances ==
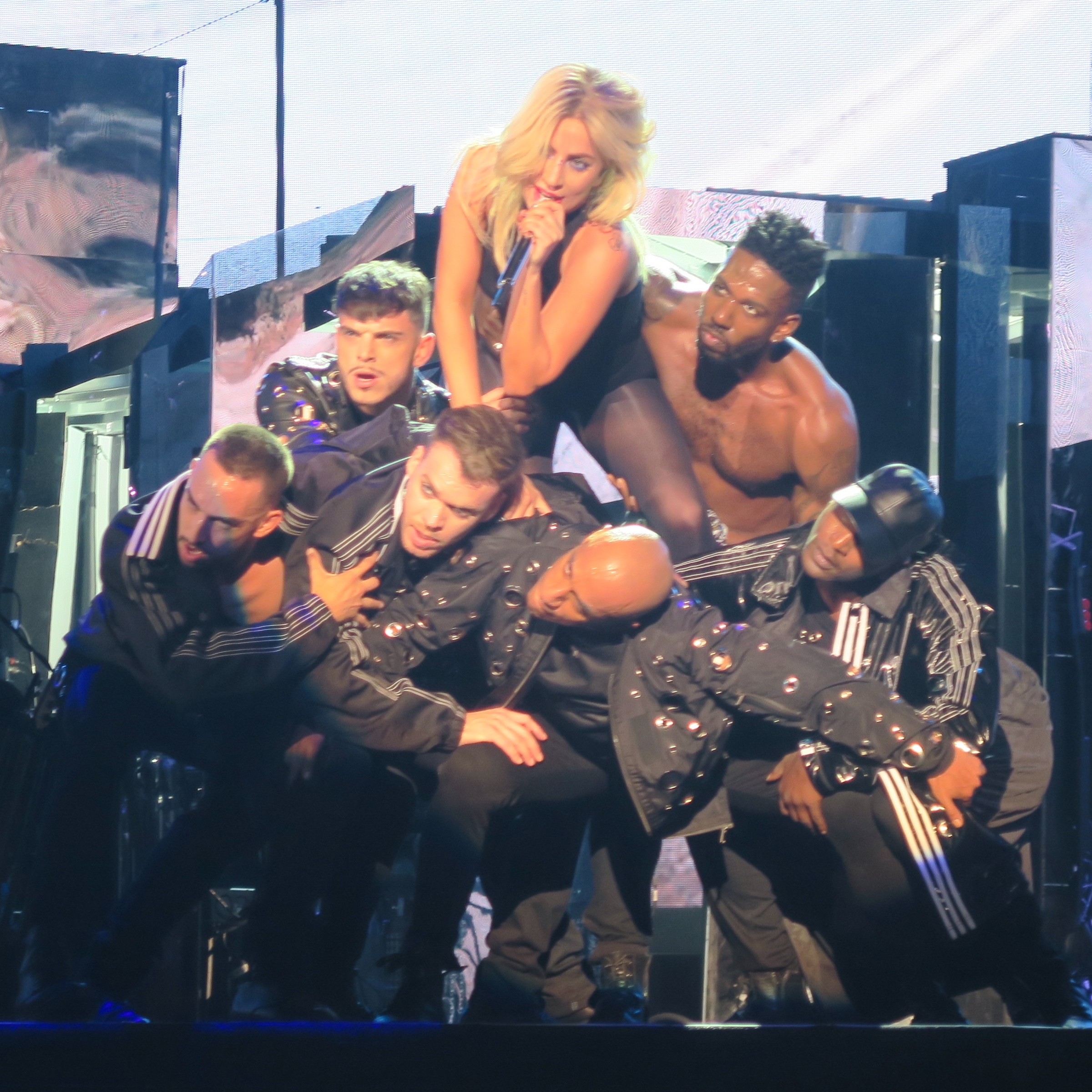
Gaga performing "John Wayne" at the 2017 Coachella Festival

Gaga first performed "John Wayne" live at the Satellite in October 2016, which was the third stop of her Dive Bar Tour, a brief promotional tour of dive bars in the United States. She next performed the song along with "A-Yo" during the Victoria's Secret Fashion Show in November 2016. The singer wore a glittering, black bodysuit with a big leather belt, high platform boots and a black, Swarovski-crystal-embellished hat for "John Wayne". Near the end of the performance, two women came on stage, putting a white leather jacket on the singer, with angel-wing-like white feathers attached to it. The wings enlarged when Gaga walked the runway during the end of the performance.

"John Wayne" was part of Gaga's set list at the 2017 Coachella Festival. She dedicated the track to all the "dangerous men" who come to music festivals. For the Joanne World Tour (2017–2018), Gaga performed "John Wayne" after her first costume change. It was preceded by a video interlude showing Gaga driving a vintage car, spinning up pink dust. After the clip, Gaga returned to the stage wearing black leather fringe costume-made by Alexander Wang, along with a black cowboy hat and over-the-knee boots. Flamethrowers accompanied Gaga and her dancers, spitting fire in the background.

== Credits and personnel ==
Management

- Stefani Germanotta P/K/A Lady Gaga (BMI) Sony ATV Songs LLC / House of Gaga Publishing, LLC / BIRB Music (ASCAP)
- All rights administered by BMG Rights Management / Songs of Zella (BMI)
- Recorded at Shangri-La Studios, Dragonfly Recording Studio (Malibu, California), Pink Duck Studios, (Burbank, California), Electric Lady Studios (New York City)
- Mixed at Electric Lady Studios (New York City)
- Mastered at Sterling Sound Studios (New York City)

Personnel

- Lady Gaga – vocals, production
- Joshua Blair – recording
- BloodPop – rhythm track, synthesizer, production
- Brandon Bost – mixing assistant
- David Covell – recording assistant
- Tom Elmhirst – mixing engineer
- Josh Homme – drums, guitar
- Barry McCready – recording assistant
- Charley Pollard – recording assistant
- Mark Ronson – bass, guitar, production
- Justin Smith – recording assistant
- Joe Visciano – mixing assistant

Credits adapted from Joanne liner notes.

== Charts ==
Weekly chart performance for "John Wayne"
Chart (2016–2017)	Peak position
Hungary (Single Top 40)	34
UK Singles (Official Charts Company)	180
US Dance Club Songs (Billboard)	52

== Certifications and sales ==
Certifications and sales for "John Wayne"
Region	Certification	Certified units/sales
Brazil (Pro-Música Brasil)	Gold	30,000^{‡}
^{‡} Sales+streaming figures based on certification alone.
