= List of Lady Gaga live performances =

Lady Gaga live performances
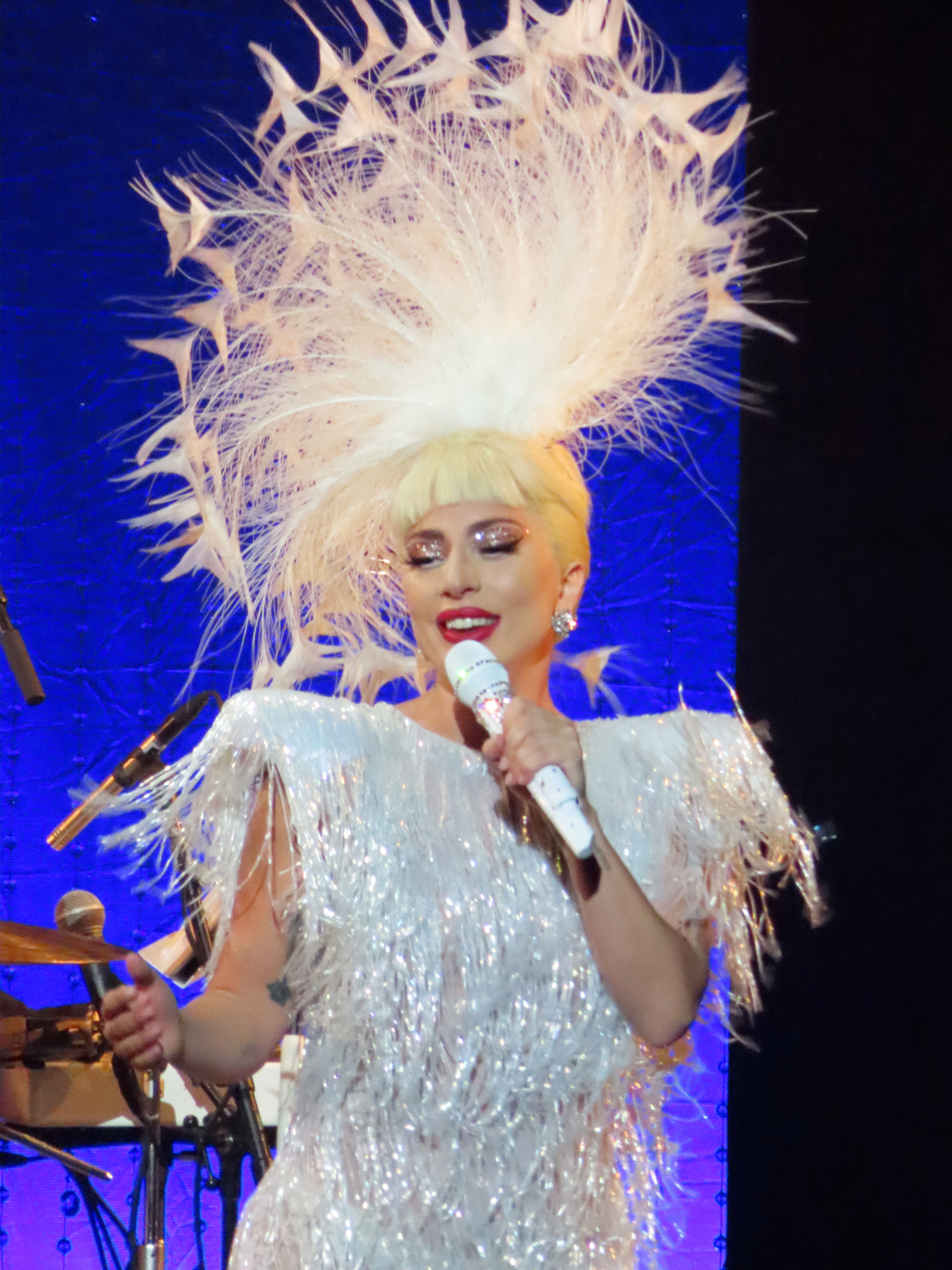
- Lady Gaga performing during her Las Vegas residency show, Jazz & Piano, in April 2022
- Concert tours: 8
- Concert residencies: 2
- Promotional concerts: 23
- Music festivals: 11
- Award shows: 36
- Television shows and specials: 128
- Radio broadcasts: 24
- Benefit and political events: 28
- Sporting events: 10
- Web performances: 12
- Other performances: 55
- Guest appearances: 42

With eight concert tours, American singer Lady Gaga has performed in every populated continent. The recipient of the Pollstar Award for Pop Touring Artist of the Decade (2010s), she has grossed more than $689.5 million in revenue from concert tours and residencies, with an attendance of 6.3 million, making her the fifth woman to cross the half-billion career total tour gross. Gaga has also performed live at award ceremonies and television shows. She promoted her debut single "Just Dance" through performances at the Miss Universe 2008 and So You Think You Can Dance. She first served as an opening act for the boy band New Kids on the Block and the girl group The Pussycat Dolls, before beginning her own headlining tour, The Fame Ball Tour, which began in March 2009 and ended in September 2009. Following the canceled tour Fame Kills: Starring Kanye West and Lady Gaga with rapper Kanye West, Gaga embarked on her second worldwide concert tour, The Monster Ball Tour. Staged in support of her extended play The Fame Monster (2009), the tour was critically acclaimed and grossed $227.4 million. Gaga also performed songs from the album at award ceremonies—the American Music Awards of 2009, 52nd Annual Grammy Awards and 2010 Brit Awards.

Gaga's second studio album Born This Way (2011) released the eponymous lead single, which she first performed at the 53rd Grammy Awards, where she emerged from an egg-like vessel. She also performed the album's track "You and I" at the 2011 MTV Video Music Awards, appearing as her male alter ego Jo Calderone. To promote the album, Gaga began the Born This Way Ball, which was critically and commercially successful. A hip injury that required surgery led Gaga to cancel some of the remaining tour dates. She performed songs from her third studio album Artpop (2013) at ArtRave, a two-day event hosted by her to promote the album. In 2014, she headlined her first residency show, with seven shows at the Roseland Ballroom in Manhattan, New York. Later that year, Gaga began the ArtRave: The Artpop Ball, which received positive reviews, but some criticized it as disjointed. After she and Tony Bennett released the joint album Cheek to Cheek (2014), they embarked on their critically acclaimed Cheek to Cheek Tour from December 2014 to August 2015.

Gaga performed a tribute to The Sound of Music (1965) at the 87th Academy Awards where she sang a medley of songs from the film's soundtrack. The performance, considered one of her best by Billboard, triggered over 214,000 interactions per minute globally on the social networking site Facebook. In 2015, Gaga released the song "Til It Happens to You", which she performed at the 2015 Billboard Women in Music, Producers Guild of America Awards 2015 and 88th Academy Awards. In 2016, she sang the US national anthem at Super Bowl 50, performed a tribute to late David Bowie at the 58th Annual Grammy Awards and sang "Million Reasons" at the American Music Awards of 2016. To promote her fifth studio album, Joanne (2016), Gaga embarked on a 3-date tour, called Dive Bar Tour, and on the Joanne World Tour. In February 2017, she performed as the headlining act at the Super Bowl LI halftime show, which became the third most-watched Super Bowl halftime show, with 117.5 million television viewers in the US. A total of 5.1 million tweets were made about Gaga's performance, making her the most tweeted about entertainer in the show's history.

Between 2018 and 2024, Gaga headlined her second residency show, called Enigma + Jazz & Piano, in Las Vegas, Nevada. She also performed "Shallow", the lead single from the soundtrack to A Star Is Born (2018), at the 61st Annual Grammy Awards and 91st Academy Awards. At the 2020 MTV Video Music Awards, Gaga performed a medley of songs from her sixth studio album, Chromatica (2020). In 2022, she embarked on The Chromatica Ball. During the 95th Academy Awards, she sang "Hold My Hand" in a stripped-down rendition. To promote her studio album Mayhem (2025), Gaga performed a series of promotional shows, including a headlining slot at Coachella 2025, where she became the second female artist to headline twice, and a free concert at Copacabana Beach in Rio de Janeiro, which was attended by an estimated 2.5 million people, making it the largest performance of Gaga's career and the most-attended free concert by a female artist in history. To further promote the album, she has embarked on her eight concert tour, The Mayhem Ball.

== Concert tours ==
=== Headlining ===
List of concert tours, showing dates, associated album(s), number of shows, and relevant statistics
| Title | Dates | Associated album | Continent(s) | Shows | Attendance | Gross | Adjusted gross (in 2025 dollar) | Ref. |
|---|---|---|---|---|---|---|---|---|
| The Fame Ball Tour | March 12 – September 29, 2009 | The Fame | North America; Europe; Oceania; Asia | 71 | —N/a | $3,150,000 | $4,727,199 | |
| The Monster Ball Tour | November 27, 2009 – May 6, 2011 | The Fame Monster | North America; Europe; Oceania; Asia | 203 | 1,583,999 | $227,400,000 | $325,457,840 | |
| Born This Way Ball | April 27, 2012 – February 11, 2013 | Born This Way | Africa; Asia; Europe; South America; North America; Oceania | 98 | 1,692,693 | $183,900,000 | $254,176,071 | |
| ArtRave: The Artpop Ball | May 4 – November 24, 2014 | Artpop | North America; Asia; Oceania; Europe | 79 | 920,088 | $83,000,000 | $112,879,533 | |
| Joanne World Tour | August 1, 2017 – February 1, 2018 | Joanne | North America; Europe | 49 | 841,935 | $94,900,000 | $121,674,728 | |
| The Chromatica Ball | July 17 – September 17, 2022 | Chromatica | Europe; North America; Asia | 20 | 834,000 | $112,400,000 | $123,660,450 | |
| The Mayhem Ball | July 16, 2025 – April 13, 2026 | Mayhem | North America; Europe; Oceania; Asia | 86 | 1,600,000 | $362,900,000 | $362,900,000 | |

=== Co-headlining ===
List of concert tours, showing dates, associated album(s), number of shows, and relevant statistics
| Title | Co-headliner | Dates | Associated album | Continent(s) | Shows | Attendance | Gross | Adjusted gross (in 2025 dollar) | Ref. |
|---|---|---|---|---|---|---|---|---|---|
| Cheek to Cheek Tour | Tony Bennett | December 30, 2014 – August 1, 2015 | Cheek to Cheek | North America; Europe | 36 | 176,267 | $15,300,000 | $20,781,623 | |

== Concert residencies ==
List of concert residencies, with the duration, number of shows, and relevant statistics
| Title | Dates | Venue | Shows | Attendance | Gross | Adjusted gross (in 2025 dollar) | Ref. |
|---|---|---|---|---|---|---|---|
| Lady Gaga Live at Roseland Ballroom | March 28, 2014 – April 7, 2014 | Roseland Ballroom, New York City | 7 | 24,532 | $1,520,000 | $2,067,191 | |
| Lady Gaga Enigma + Jazz & Piano | December 28, 2018 – July 6, 2024 | Dolby Live, Paradise, Nevada | 72 | 376,652 | $110,041,261 | $112,936,162 | |

== Promotional concerts ==
List of promotional concerts, with the duration, number of shows, and performed songs
| Date | Event | Venue | Location | Performed song(s) | Ref. |
|---|---|---|---|---|---|
| April 24, 2007 – February 14, 2008 | Lady GaGa and the Starlight Revue (with Lady Starlight) | Various | New York City | "Beautiful, Dirty, Rich"; "Paparazzi"; "Just Dance" | |
| March 27, 2008 – March 11, 2009 | Just Dance Promo Tour | Various | North America; Europe; Australia | "LoveGame"; "Eh, Eh (Nothing Else I Can Say)"; "Poker Face"; "Beautiful, Dirty, Rich"; "Paparazzi"; "Just Dance" | |
| July 3, 2011 | Born This Way Showcase | Fulfillment Amphitheater | Taichung | "Born This Way"; "Just Dance"; "Poker Face"; "Telephone"; "Alejandro"; "You and I"; "Hair"; "Bad Romance"; "The Edge of Glory"; "Judas" | |
| July 7, 2011 | Born This Way Showcase | Marina Bay Sands | Singapore | "Born This Way"; "Just Dance"; "Poker Face"; "Telephone"; "Alejandro"; "You and I"; "Hair"; "Bad Romance"; "The Edge of Glory"; "Judas" | |
| July 13, 2011 (Note: Televised as Gaga Live at Sydney Monster Hall.) | Born This Way Showcase | Sydney Town Hall | Sydney | "Born This Way"; "Just Dance"; "Poker Face"; "Telephone"; "Alejandro"; "You and I"; "Hair"; "Bad Romance"; "The Edge of Glory"; "Judas" | |
| November 11, 2013 | ArtRave | Duggal Greenhouse | New York City | "Aura"; "Artpop"; "Venus"; "Manicure"; "Sexxx Dreams"; "Gypsy"; "Dope"; "Applause"; "Do What U Want" | |
| July 28, 2014 | Cheek to Cheek Live (with Tony Bennett) | Jazz at Lincoln Center | New York City | "Anything Goes"; "Cheek to Cheek"; "They All Laughed"; "Nature Boy"; "Goody Goody"; "Bang Bang (My Baby Shot Me Down)"; "Bewitched, Bothered and Bewildered"; "Firefly"; "I Won't Dance"; "I Can't Give You Anything but Love"; "Lush Life"; "Let's Face the Music and Dance"; "Ev'ry Time We Say Goodbye"; "But Beautiful"; "It Don't Mean a Thing (If It Ain't Got That Swing)" | |
| September 22, 2014 | Cheek to Cheek Live (with Tony Bennett) | Grand-Place | Brussels | "They All Laughed"; "But Beautiful"; "Anything Goes"; "Bewitched, Bothered and Bewildered"; "I Can't Give You Anything but Love"; "Lush Life"; "It Don't Mean a Thing (If It Ain't Got That Swing)" (with Tony Bennett); "Ev'ry Time We Say Goodbye" | |
| October 5, 2016 | Dive Bar Tour | The 5 Spot | Nashville | "Sinner's Prayer"; "A-Yo"; "Million Reasons"; "Perfect Illusion" | |
| October 20, 2016 | Dive Bar Tour | The Bitter End | New York City | "Diamond Heart"; "A-Yo"; "Joanne"; "Grigio Girls"; "Million Reasons"; "Just Another Day" | |
| October 20, 2016 | Dive Bar Tour | The Bitter End | New York City | "Joanne"; "Angel Down" (Performance on the roof of the venue after the show) | |
| October 27, 2016 | Dive Bar Tour | The Satellite | Los Angeles | "Come to Mama"; "A-Yo"; "John Wayne"; "Million Reasons"; "Angel Down"; "Joanne"; "Perfect Illusion" | |
| December 30, 2016 | An Intimate Evening with Lady Gaga | Encore at Wynn Las Vegas | Paradise | "New York, New York"; "Coquette"; "Is You Is or Is You Ain't My Baby"; "Call Me Irresponsible"; "Firefly"; "Bewitched, Bothered and Bewildered"; "Ev'ry Time We Say Goodbye"; "I Can't Give You Anything but Love"; "Bang Bang (My Baby Shot Me Down)"; "Let's Face the Music and Dance"; "What a Diff'rence a Day Makes"; "Bad Romance"; "Million Reasons"; "The Lady Is a Tramp"; "La Vie en rose" | |
| August 3, 2021 | One Last Time (with Tony Bennett) | Radio City Music Hall | New York City | "Luck Be a Lady"; "Orange Colored Sky"; "Call Me Irresponsible"; "Someone to Watch Over Me"; "I Can't Give You Anything but Love"; "Bang Bang (My Baby Shot Me Down)"; "Coquette"; "What a Diff'rence a Day Makes"; "La Vie en rose"; "Let's Do It"; "New York, New York"; "Happy Birthday to You"; "The Lady Is a Tramp"; "Anything Goes"; "Love for Sale"; "It Don't Mean a Thing (If It Ain't Got That Swing)" | |
| August 5, 2021 | One Last Time (with Tony Bennett) | Radio City Music Hall | New York City | "Luck Be a Lady"; "Orange Colored Sky"; "Call Me Irresponsible"; "Someone to Watch Over Me"; "I Can't Give You Anything but Love"; "Bang Bang (My Baby Shot Me Down)"; "Coquette"; "What a Diff'rence a Day Makes"; "La Vie en rose"; "Let's Do It"; "New York, New York"; "Happy Birthday to You"; "The Lady Is a Tramp"; "Anything Goes"; "Love for Sale"; "It Don't Mean a Thing (If It Ain't Got That Swing)" | |
| September 30, 2024 | Harlequin Live (Note: Released on Gaga's YouTube channel as Lady Gaga in Harlequin Live: One Night Only on December 24, 2025; "Die with a Smile" was not included in the broadcast.) | The Belasco | Los Angeles | "Good Morning"; "Get Happy (2024)"; "Oh, When the Saints"; "World on a String"; "If My Friends Could See Me Now"; "That's Entertainment"; "Smile"; "The Joker"; "Folie à Deux"; "Gonna Build a Mountain"; "Die with a Smile"; "Close to You"; "Happy Mistake"; "That's Life" | |
| April 26, 2025 | Long Live Mayhem | Estadio GNP Seguros | Mexico City | "Bloody Mary"; "Abracadabra"; "Judas"; "Scheiße"; "Garden of Eden"; "Poker Face"; "Perfect Celebrity"; "Disease"; "Paparazzi"; "Alejandro"; "The Beast"; "Killah"; "Zombieboy"; "Die with a Smile"; "How Bad Do U Want Me"; "Shadow of a Man"; "Kill for Love"; "Born This Way"; "Blade of Grass" (Note: "Always Remember Us This Way" was performed in place of "Blade of Grass" on May 21 and 24, 2025, in Singapore.); "Shallow"; "Vanish into You"; "Bad Romance" | |
| April 27, 2025 | Long Live Mayhem | Estadio GNP Seguros | Mexico City | "Bloody Mary"; "Abracadabra"; "Judas"; "Scheiße"; "Garden of Eden"; "Poker Face"; "Perfect Celebrity"; "Disease"; "Paparazzi"; "Alejandro"; "The Beast"; "Killah"; "Zombieboy"; "Die with a Smile"; "How Bad Do U Want Me"; "Shadow of a Man"; "Kill for Love"; "Born This Way"; "Blade of Grass"; "Shallow"; "Vanish into You"; "Bad Romance" | |
| May 3, 2025 | Mayhem on the Beach | Copacabana Beach | Rio de Janeiro | "Bloody Mary"; "Abracadabra"; "Judas"; "Scheiße"; "Garden of Eden"; "Poker Face"; "Perfect Celebrity"; "Disease"; "Paparazzi"; "Alejandro"; "The Beast"; "Killah"; "Zombieboy"; "Die with a Smile"; "How Bad Do U Want Me"; "Shadow of a Man"; "Kill for Love"; "Born This Way"; "Blade of Grass"; "Shallow"; "Vanish into You"; "Bad Romance" | |
| May 18, 2025 | Lion City Mayhem | Singapore National Stadium | Singapore | "Bloody Mary"; "Abracadabra"; "Judas"; "Scheiße"; "Garden of Eden"; "Poker Face"; "Perfect Celebrity"; "Disease"; "Paparazzi"; "Alejandro"; "The Beast"; "Killah"; "Zombieboy"; "Die with a Smile"; "How Bad Do U Want Me"; "Shadow of a Man"; "Kill for Love"; "Born This Way"; "Blade of Grass"; "Shallow"; "Vanish into You"; "Bad Romance" | |
| May 19, 2025 | Lion City Mayhem | Singapore National Stadium | Singapore | "Bloody Mary"; "Abracadabra"; "Judas"; "Scheiße"; "Garden of Eden"; "Poker Face"; "Perfect Celebrity"; "Disease"; "Paparazzi"; "Alejandro"; "The Beast"; "Killah"; "Zombieboy"; "Die with a Smile"; "How Bad Do U Want Me"; "Shadow of a Man"; "Kill for Love"; "Born This Way"; "Blade of Grass"; "Shallow"; "Vanish into You"; "Bad Romance" | |
| May 21, 2025 | Lion City Mayhem | Singapore National Stadium | Singapore | "Bloody Mary"; "Abracadabra"; "Judas"; "Scheiße"; "Garden of Eden"; "Poker Face"; "Perfect Celebrity"; "Disease"; "Paparazzi"; "Alejandro"; "The Beast"; "Killah"; "Zombieboy"; "Die with a Smile"; "How Bad Do U Want Me"; "Shadow of a Man"; "Kill for Love"; "Born This Way"; "Blade of Grass"; "Shallow"; "Vanish into You"; "Bad Romance" | |
| May 24, 2025 | Lion City Mayhem | Singapore National Stadium | Singapore | "Bloody Mary"; "Abracadabra"; "Judas"; "Scheiße"; "Garden of Eden"; "Poker Face"; "Perfect Celebrity"; "Disease"; "Paparazzi"; "Alejandro"; "The Beast"; "Killah"; "Zombieboy"; "Die with a Smile"; "How Bad Do U Want Me"; "Shadow of a Man"; "Kill for Love"; "Born This Way"; "Blade of Grass"; "Shallow"; "Vanish into You"; "Bad Romance" | |
| January 14, 2026 | Mayhem: Requiem | Wiltern Theatre | Los Angeles | "Disease"; "Abracadabra"; "Garden of Eden"; "Perfect Celebrity"; "Vanish into You"; "Killah"; "Zombieboy"; "LoveDrug"; "How Bad Do U Want Me"; "Don't Call Tonight"; "Shadow of a Man"; "The Beast"; "Blade of Grass"; "Die with a Smile"; "Can't Stop the High" | |

== Music festivals ==
List of festival performances, showing dates, locations, and performed songs
| Date | Event | Venue | Location | Performed song(s) | Ref. |
|---|---|---|---|---|---|
| August 4, 2007 | Lollapalooza (with Lady Starlight) | Grant Park | Chicago, Illinois | "Blueberry Kisses"; "Dirty Ice Cream"; "Disco Heaven"; "Brown Eyes"; "Summerboy"; "Paparazzi"; "Boys Boys Boys" | |
| December 5, 2009 | Capital FM Jingle Bell Ball | The O2 Arena | London, England | "Just Dance"; "LoveGame"; "Poker Face"; "Paparazzi"; "Teeth"; "Bad Romance" | |
| May 15, 2011 | BBC Radio 1's Big Weekend | Carlisle Airport | Carlisle, England | "Born This Way"; "Bad Romance"; "Telephone" / "Poker Face" / "Alejandro"; "Orange Colored Sky"; "Speechless"; "The Edge of Glory"; "You and I"; "Americano"; "Just Dance"; "Judas" | |
| September 24, 2011 | iHeartRadio Music Festival | MGM Grand Garden Arena | Las Vegas, Nevada | "Scheiße"; "Judas"; "Bad Romance"; "Just Dance"; "LoveGame"; "Poker Face"; "Hair"; "You and I"; "Alejandro"; "Telephone"; "Paparazzi"; "Stand by Me" / "King of Pain" (with Sting); "The Edge of Glory"; "Born This Way" | |
| December 3, 2011 | KIIS-FM Jingle Ball | Nokia Theatre L.A. Live | Los Angeles, California | "The Edge of Glory"; "Bad Romance"; "Just Dance"; "Poker Face"; "Telephone"; "Judas"; "White Christmas"; "You and I"; "Hair"; "Born This Way"; "Marry the Night" | |
| December 9, 2011 | Z100 Jingle Ball | Madison Square Garden | New York City | "The Edge of Glory"; "Bad Romance"; "Just Dance"; "Poker Face"; "Telephone"; "Judas"; "White Christmas"; "You and I"; "Hair"; "Born This Way"; "Marry the Night" | |
| September 1, 2013 | iTunes Festival | Roundhouse | London, England | "Aura"; "Manicure"; "Artpop"; "Jewels n' Drugs" (with Too Short and Twista); "Sexxx Dreams"; "Swine"; "I Wanna Be with You"; "Applause" | |
| December 8, 2013 | Capital FM Jingle Bell Ball | The O2 Arena | London, England | "Poker Face"; "Just Dance"; "Bad Romance"; "Born This Way"; "Aura"; "Artpop"; "Do What U Want"; "Applause" | |
| March 13, 2014 | SXSW | Stubb's Bar-B-Q | Austin, Texas | "Aura" (with Zedd); "Manicure"; "Jewels n' Drugs" (with Twista); "Swine" (with Millie Brown); "Dope"; "Bad Romance"; "Monster for Life"; "Applause"; "Gypsy" | |
| April 14, 2017 | Coachella | Empire Polo Club | Indio, California | "Scheiße"; "LoveGame"; "John Wayne"; "Just Dance"; "Born This Way"; "Venus"; "A-Yo"; "Sexxx Dreams"; "Telephone"; "Alejandro"; "Teeth"; "The Cure"; "The Edge of Glory"; "Speechless"; "You and I"; "Million Reasons" (Andrelli Remix); "Poker Face"; "Bad Romance" | |
| April 21, 2017 | Coachella | Empire Polo Club | Indio, California | "Scheiße"; "LoveGame"; "John Wayne"; "Just Dance"; "Born This Way"; "Venus"; "A-Yo"; "Sexxx Dreams"; "Telephone"; "Alejandro"; "Teeth"; "The Cure"; "The Edge of Glory"; "Speechless"; "You and I"; "Million Reasons" (Andrelli Remix); "Poker Face"; "Bad Romance" | |
| April 11, 2025 | Coachella | Empire Polo Club | Indio, California | "Bloody Mary"; "Abracadabra"; "Judas"; "Scheiße"; "Garden of Eden"; "Poker Face"; "Perfect Celebrity"; "Disease"; "Paparazzi"; "Alejandro"; "The Beast"; "Killah"; "Zombieboy"; "Die with a Smile"; "How Bad Do U Want Me"; "Shadow of a Man"; "Born This Way"; "Shallow"; "Vanish into You"; "Bad Romance" | |
| April 18, 2025 | Coachella | Empire Polo Club | Indio, California | "Bloody Mary"; "Abracadabra"; "Judas"; "Scheiße"; "Garden of Eden"; "Poker Face"; "Perfect Celebrity"; "Disease"; "Paparazzi"; "Alejandro"; "The Beast"; "Killah"; "Zombieboy"; "Die with a Smile"; "How Bad Do U Want Me"; "Shadow of a Man"; "Born This Way"; "Shallow"; "Vanish into You"; "Bad Romance" | |

== Award shows ==
List of performances at award shows, with the location and performed songs
| Date | Event | Venue | Location | Performed song(s) | Ref. |
|---|---|---|---|---|---|
| June 7, 2008 | 2008 NewNowNext Awards | MTV Studios | New York City | "Just Dance" | |
| February 18, 2009 | 2009 Brit Awards | Earls Court | London, England | "What Have I Done to Deserve This?"; "West End Girls" (with Pet Shop Boys and Brandon Flowers) | |
| June 21, 2009 | 2009 MuchMusic Video Awards | 299 Queen Street West | Toronto, Canada | "LoveGame"; "Poker Face" | |
| September 13, 2009 | 2009 MTV Video Music Awards | Radio City Music Hall | New York City | "Poker Face" / "Paparazzi" | |
| November 22, 2009 | American Music Awards of 2009 | Nokia Theatre | Los Angeles, California | "Bad Romance"; "Speechless" | |
| January 31, 2010 | 52nd Annual Grammy Awards | Staples Center | Los Angeles, California | "Poker Face"; "Speechless" / "Your Song" (with Elton John) | |
| February 16, 2010 | 2010 Brit Awards | Earls Court | London, England | "Telephone" / "Dance in the Dark" | |
| February 13, 2011 | 53rd Annual Grammy Awards | Staples Center | Los Angeles, California | "Born This Way" | |
| June 19, 2011 | 2011 MuchMusic Video Awards | 299 Queen Street West | Toronto, Canada | "The Edge of Glory"; "Born This Way" | |
| June 25, 2011 | 2011 MTV Video Music Aid Japan | Makuhari Messe | Chiba, Japan | "The Edge of Glory"; "Born This Way" | |
| August 28, 2011 | 2011 MTV Video Music Awards | Nokia Theatre | Los Angeles, California | "You and I" (with Brian May) | |
| November 6, 2011 | 2011 MTV Europe Music Awards | Odyssey Arena | Belfast, Northern Ireland | "Marry the Night" | |
| November 10, 2011 | 2011 Bambi Award | Rhein-Main Halle | Wiesbaden, Germany | "Marry the Night" | |
| August 25, 2013 | 2013 MTV Video Music Awards | Barclays Center | New York City | "Applause" | |
| November 3, 2013 | 2013 YouTube Music Awards | Pier 36 | New York City | "Dope" | |
| November 24, 2013 | American Music Awards of 2013 | Nokia Theatre | Los Angeles, California | "Do What U Want" (with R. Kelly) | |
| December 7, 2014 | 37th Kennedy Center Honors | Kennedy Center | Washington, D.C. | "If I Ever Lose My Faith in You" | |
| February 8, 2015 | 57th Annual Grammy Awards | Staples Center | Los Angeles, California | "Cheek to Cheek" (with Tony Bennett) | |
| February 22, 2015 | 87th Academy Awards | Dolby Theatre | Hollywood, California | "The Sound of Music"; "My Favorite Things"; "Edelweiss"; "Climb Ev'ry Mountain" (tribute to The Sound of Music) | |
| June 18, 2015 | 46th Songwriters Hall of Fame Induction Ceremony | Marriott Marquis | New York City | "What's Up?" | |
| December 18, 2015 | 2015 Billboard Women in Music | Cipriani Wall Street | New York City | "Til It Happens to You" | |
| January 23, 2016 | Producers Guild of America Awards 2015 | Hyatt Regency Century Plaza | Los Angeles, California | "Til It Happens to You" | |
| February 15, 2016 | 58th Annual Grammy Awards | Staples Center | Los Angeles, California | "Space Oddity"; "Changes"; "Ziggy Stardust"; "Suffragette City"; "Rebel Rebel"; "Fashion"; "Fame"; "Under Pressure"; "Let's Dance"; "Heroes" (with Nile Rodgers) (tribute to David Bowie) | |
| February 28, 2016 | 88th Academy Awards | Dolby Theatre | Hollywood, California | "Til It Happens to You" | |
| November 20, 2016 | American Music Awards of 2016 | Microsoft Theater | Los Angeles, California | "Million Reasons" | |
| February 12, 2017 | 59th Annual Grammy Awards | Staples Center | Los Angeles, California | "Moth into Flame" (with Metallica) | |
| November 19, 2017 | American Music Awards of 2017 | Microsoft Theater | Los Angeles, California | "The Cure" (Note: Broadcast live from the Joanne World Tour show at Capital One Arena in Washington, D.C.) | |
| January 28, 2018 | 60th Annual Grammy Awards | Madison Square Garden | New York City | "Joanne"; "Million Reasons" (with Mark Ronson) | |
| February 10, 2019 | 61st Annual Grammy Awards | Staples Center | Los Angeles, California | "Shallow" (with Mark Ronson, Andrew Wyatt and Anthony Rossomando) | |
| February 24, 2019 | 91st Academy Awards | Dolby Theatre | Hollywood, California | "Shallow" (with Bradley Cooper) | |
| August 30, 2020 | 2020 MTV Video Music Awards | MTV Headquarters | New York City | "Chromatica II" / "911"; "Rain on Me" (with Ariana Grande); "Stupid Love" | |
| April 3, 2022 | 64th Annual Grammy Awards | MGM Grand Garden Arena | Paradise, Nevada | "Love for Sale"; "Do I Love You" | |
| March 12, 2023 | 95th Academy Awards | Dolby Theatre | Hollywood, California | "Hold My Hand" | |
| February 2, 2025 | 67th Annual Grammy Awards | Crypto.com Arena | Los Angeles, California | "California Dreamin'" (with Bruno Mars; tribute to Los Angeles) | |
| September 7, 2025 | 2025 MTV Video Music Awards | UBS Arena | Elmont, New York | "Abracadabra; "The Dead Dance" (Note: Broadcast from The Mayhem Ball show at Madison Square Garden.) | |
| February 1, 2026 | 68th Annual Grammy Awards | Crypto.com Arena | Los Angeles, California | "Abracadabra" | |

== Television shows and specials ==
Key
| † | Indicates television specials produced or created by Lady Gaga |

List of performances on television shows and specials, with the country of origin and performed songs
| Date | Event | Country | Performed song(s) | Ref. |
|---|---|---|---|---|
| July 14, 2008 | 57th Miss Universe Pageant | Vietnam | "Just Dance" | |
| July 31, 2008 | So You Think You Can Dance | United States | "Just Dance" | |
| August 20, 2008 | MuchOnDemand | Canada | "Just Dance"; "LoveGame" | |
| August 29, 2008 | The Dome | Germany | "Just Dance" | |
| August 30, 2008 | Sommarkrysset | Sweden | "LoveGame"; "Brown Eyes"; "Just Dance" | |
| September 26, 2008 | Sunrise | Australia | "Just Dance" | |
| September 28, 2008 | Rove | Australia | "Just Dance" | |
| October 23, 2008 | Jimmy Kimmel Live! | United States | "Just Dance"; "Poker Face" | |
| October 29, 2008 | Good Day New York | United States | "Just Dance" | |
| December 1, 2008 | The Ellen DeGeneres Show | United States | "Just Dance" | |
| December 31, 2008 | New Year's Eve Live | United States | "Just Dance" | |
| January 8, 2009 | The Tonight Show with Jay Leno | United States | "Just Dance" | |
| January 16, 2009 | GMTV | United Kingdom | "Just Dance" | |
| January 18, 2009 | T4 | United Kingdom | "Just Dance"; "Poker Face" | |
| January 18, 2009 | The Sunday Night Project | United Kingdom | "Just Dance" | |
| January 18, 2009 | MTV Spanking New Session | United Kingdom | "Beautiful, Dirty, Rich"; "LoveGame"; "Poker Face"; "Just Dance" | |
| January 28, 2009 | Freshly Squeezed | United Kingdom | "Just Dance"; "Poker Face" | |
| January 31, 2009 | Tubridy Tonight | Ireland | "Just Dance" | |
| February 4, 2009 | The Album Chart Show | United Kingdom | "Beautiful, Dirty, Rich"; "LoveGame"; "Paparazzi"; "Poker Face"; "Just Dance" | |
| February 4, 2009 | The Dome | Germany | "Just Dance"; "Poker Face" | |
| February 20, 2009 | Fama ¡A Bailar! | Spain | "Just Dance" | |
| March 5, 2009 | No disparen al pianista | Spain | "Poker Face"; "Just Dance" | |
| March 10, 2009 | The View | United States | "Just Dance" | |
| March 29, 2009 | Star Académie | Canada | "Poker Face" | |
| April 1, 2009 | American Idol | United States | "Poker Face" | |
| April 16, 2009 | Friday Night with Jonathan Ross | United Kingdom | "Poker Face" | |
| April 18, 2009 | Schlag den Raab | Germany | "Poker Face" | |
| April 19, 2009 | Quelli che... il Calcio | Italy | "Poker Face" | |
| April 20, 2009 | The Paul O'Grady Show | United Kingdom | "Poker Face" | |
| April 22, 2009 | Mooi! Weer De Leeuw | Netherlands | "Poker Face" | |
| April 23, 2009 | Le Grand Journal | France | "Poker Face" | |
| April 24, 2009 | LOS40 Primavera Pop | Spain | "Just Dance"; "Poker Face" | |
| April 28, 2009 | SWR3 Late Night | Germany | "LoveGame"; "Beautiful, Dirty, Rich"; "The Fame"; "Eh, Eh (Nothing Else I Can Say)"; "Poker Face" (Acoustic Version); "Paparazzi"; "Just Dance"; "Poker Face" | |
| May 11, 2009 | The Ellen DeGeneres Show | United States | "Poker Face" | |
| May 12, 2009 | Dancing with the Stars | United States | "LoveGame"; "Just Dance" | |
| May 17, 2009 | Rove | Australia | "LoveGame" | |
| May 25, 2009 | Live at the Chapel | Australia | "Paparazzi"; "LoveGame"; "The Fame"; "Eh, Eh (Nothing Else I Can Say)"; "Just Dance"; "Poker Face" | |
| June 12, 2009 | Music Station | Japan | "Just Dance" | |
| June 18, 2009 | M Countdown | South Korea | "Just Dance" | |
| July 16, 2009 | GMTV | United Kingdom | "Paparazzi" | |
| August 5, 2009 | SUKKIRI! | Japan | "Poker Face" | |
| August 28, 2009 | Music Japan Overseas | Japan | "Just Dance" | |
| September 8, 2009 | The Ellen DeGeneres Show | United States | "LoveGame" | |
| September 10, 2009 | Taratata | France | "Eh, Eh (Nothing Else I Can Say)"; "Maple Leaf Rag"; "Poker Face" | |
| October 3, 2009 | Saturday Night Live | United States | "Paparazzi"; "LoveGame" / "Bad Romance" / "Poker Face" | |
| November 16, 2009 | Gossip Girl – Season 3 ("The Last Days of Disco Stick") | United States | "Bad Romance" | |
| November 23, 2009 | The Tonight Show with Jay Leno | United States | "Bad Romance" | |
| November 27, 2009 | The Ellen DeGeneres Show | United States | "Bad Romance"; "Speechless" | |
| December 6, 2009 | The X Factor UK | United Kingdom | "Bad Romance" | |
| December 7, 2009 | Royal Variety Performance | United Kingdom | "Speechless" | |
| January 15, 2010 | The Oprah Winfrey Show | United States | "Monster" / "Bad Romance"; "Speechless" | |
| March 2, 2010 | Friday Night with Jonathan Ross | United Kingdom | "Brown Eyes"; "Telephone" | |
| April 16, 2010 | Music Station | Japan | "Telephone" | |
| May 5, 2010 | American Idol | United States | "Bad Romance"; "Alejandro" | |
| July 9, 2010 | Today | United States | "Someone to Watch Over Me"; "Bad Romance"; "You and I"; "Alejandro"; "Teeth" | |
| April 28, 2011 | The Ellen DeGeneres Show | United States | "Judas" | |
| May 5, 2011 | The Oprah Winfrey Show | United States | "Born This Way"; "You and I" | |
| May 7, 2011 (Note: Recorded from The Monster Ball Tour on February 21–22, 2011.) | Lady Gaga Presents the Monster Ball Tour: At Madison Square Garden † | United States | "Dance in the Dark"; "Glitter and Grease"; "Just Dance"; "Beautiful, Dirty, Rich"; "The Fame"; "LoveGame"; "Boys Boys Boys"; "Money Honey"; "Telephone"; "Speechless"; "You and I"; "So Happy I Could Die"; "Monster"; "Teeth"; "Alejandro"; "Poker Face"; "Paparazzi"; "Bad Romance"; "Born This Way" | |
| May 11, 2011 | Le Grand Journal | France | "Judas" | |
| May 13, 2011 | The Graham Norton Show | United Kingdom | "Born This Way"; "Judas" | |
| May 21, 2011 | Saturday Night Live | United States | "The Edge of Glory" / "Judas"; "Born This Way" | |
| May 25, 2011 | American Idol | United States | "The Edge of Glory" | |
| May 27, 2011 | Good Morning America | United States | "Bad Romance"; "The Edge of Glory"; "Judas"; "Born This Way"; "Hair" | |
| June 9, 2011 | Germany's Next Topmodel | Germany | "Scheiße"; "Born This Way"; "The Edge of Glory" | |
| June 13, 2011 | The X Factor France | France | "The Edge of Glory"; "Judas" | |
| June 15, 2011 | Le Grand Journal | France | "The Edge of Glory" | |
| June 17, 2011 | Paul O'Grady Live | United Kingdom | "Hair"; "The Edge of Glory"; "You and I"; "Born This Way" / "Judas" | |
| June 28, 2011 | Taratata | France | "Born This Way"; "Hair"; "The Edge of Glory" | |
| June 29, 2011 | SMAP×SMAP | Japan | "The Edge of Glory"; "You and I"; "Born This Way" (with SMAP) | |
| July 10, 2011 | Music Lovers | Japan | "Born This Way"; "The Edge of Glory"; "Judas" | |
| July 11, 2011 | A Current Affair | Australia | "Born This Way"; "The Edge of Glory"; "You and I" | |
| July 27, 2011 | So You Think You Can Dance | United States | "The Edge of Glory"; "You and I" | |
| July 28, 2011 | Jimmy Kimmel Live! | United States | "You and I"; "The Edge of Glory" | |
| August 1, 2011 | The View | United States | "You and I" | |
| October 6, 2011 | The Jonathan Ross Show | United Kingdom | "You and I" | |
| November 13, 2011 | The X Factor UK | United Kingdom | "Marry the Night" | |
| November 16, 2011 | Alan Carr: Chatty Man | United Kingdom | "Marry the Night" | |
| November 24, 2011 (Note: Recorded on October 22–23, 2011.) | A Very Gaga Thanksgiving (Note: A selection from this performance was included in the A Very Gaga Holiday EP.) † | United States | "The Lady Is a Tramp" (with Tony Bennett); "Born This Way"; "You and I"; "The Edge of Glory"; "White Christmas"; "Orange Colored Sky"; "Hair"; "Bad Romance"; "Marry the Night" | |
| November 30, 2011 | The Grammy Nominations Concert Live! – Countdown to Music's Biggest Night | United States | "Marry the Night"; "You and I" (with Sugarland) | |
| December 5, 2011 | The Ellen DeGeneres Show | United States | "Marry the Night" | |
| December 23, 2011 | Music Station | Japan | "Marry the Night"; "Born This Way" | |
| December 31, 2011 | Kōhaku Uta Gassen | Japan | "You and I"; "Born This Way" | |
| December 31, 2011 | Dick Clark's New Year's Rockin' Eve | United States | "Heavy Metal Lover"; "Marry the Night"; "Born This Way" | |
| September 9, 2013 | Good Morning America | United States | "Over the Rainbow" / "Applause" | |
| October 27, 2013 | The X Factor UK | United Kingdom | "Venus"; "Do What U Want" | |
| October 29, 2013 | The Graham Norton Show | United Kingdom | "Do What U Want"; "Venus" | |
| November 16, 2013 | Saturday Night Live | United States | "Do What U Want" (with R. Kelly); "Gypsy" | |
| November 28, 2013 (Note: Recorded on October 8–9, 2013.) | Lady Gaga and the Muppets Holiday Spectacular † | United States | "Venus" (with the Muppets); "Applause"; "Bennie and the Jets" / "Artpop" (with Elton John); "Manicure"; "Gypsy" (with Kermit the Frog); "Baby, It's Cold Outside" (with Joseph Gordon-Levitt); "Fashion!" (with RuPaul); "Applause" (with the Muppets) | |
| November 29, 2013 | Music Station | Japan | "Applause" | |
| December 2, 2013 | SMAP×SMAP | Japan | "Venus"; "Applause" (with SMAP) | |
| December 4, 2013 | Alan Carr: Chatty Man | United Kingdom | "Dope"; "Do What U Want" | |
| December 10, 2013 | SUKKIRI! | Japan | "Applause"; "Gypsy" | |
| December 17, 2013 | The Voice | United States | "Do What U Want" (with Christina Aguilera) | |
| January 24, 2014 | A MusiCares Tribute To Carole King | United States | "You've Got a Friend" | |
| February 18, 2014 | The Tonight Show Starring Jimmy Fallon | United States | "Artpop" | |
| April 2, 2014 | Late Show with David Letterman | United States | "Dope"; "G.U.Y." | |
| October 19, 2014 | Strictly Come Dancing | United Kingdom | "Anything Goes"; "It Don't Mean a Thing (If It Ain't Got That Swing)" (with Tony Bennett) | |
| October 24, 2014 (Note: Recorded on July 28, 2014.) | Tony Bennett and Lady Gaga: Cheek to Cheek Live! † | United States | "Anything Goes"; "Cheek to Cheek"; "Nature Boy"; "Bang Bang (My Baby Shot Me Down)"; "Firefly"; "I Won't Dance"; "I Can't Give You Anything but Love"; "Lush Life"; "Let's Face the Music and Dance"; "But Beautiful"; "It Don't Mean a Thing (If It Ain't Got That Swing)" (with Tony Bennett) | |
| November 26, 2014 | The View | United States | "Cheek to Cheek" (with Tony Bennett) | |
| December 2, 2014 | The Colbert Report | United States | "Cheek to Cheek" (with Tony Bennett) | |
| December 3, 2014 | Good Morning America | United States | "Cheek to Cheek" (with Tony Bennett) | |
| December 3, 2014 | Christmas in Rockefeller Center | United States | "Winter Wonderland"; "It Don't Mean a Thing (If It Ain't Got That Swing)" (with Tony Bennett) | |
| December 17, 2014 | The Tonight Show Starring Jimmy Fallon | United States | "Cheek to Cheek"; "It Don't Mean a Thing (If It Ain't Got That Swing)" (with Tony Bennett); "Ev'ry Time We Say Goodbye" | |
| December 25, 2014 | Good Morning America | United States | "Winter Wonderland" (with Tony Bennett) | |
| December 31, 2014 | New Year's Eve with Carson Daly | United States | "Cheek to Cheek"; "It Don't Mean a Thing (If It Ain't Got That Swing)" (with Tony Bennett) | |
| February 16, 2015 | Stevie Wonder: Songs in the Key of Life – An All-Star Grammy Salute | United States | "I Wish" | |
| December 6, 2015 | Sinatra 100 – All-Star Grammy Concert | United States | "New York, New York" | |
| October 22, 2016 | Saturday Night Live | United States | "A-Yo"; "Million Reasons" | |
| October 25, 2016 | The Late Late Show with James Corden | United States | "Perfect Illusion"; "Bad Romance"; "The Edge of Glory"; "Born This Way"; "Poker Face"; "Million Reasons" (Carpool Karaoke segment); "A-Yo" | |
| November 1, 2016 | SUKKIRI! | Japan | "Perfect Illusion" | |
| November 4, 2016 | News Zero | Japan | "Joanne" | |
| December 4, 2016 | The X Factor UK | United Kingdom | "Million Reasons" | |
| December 5, 2016 | Victoria's Secret Fashion Show 2016 | France | "Million Reasons"; "A-Yo"; "John Wayne" | |
| December 9, 2016 | Alan Carr: Happy Hour | United Kingdom | "Million Reasons" | |
| December 12, 2016 | SMAP×SMAP | Japan | "Million Reasons"; "Perfect Illusion"; "A-Yo" (with SMAP) | |
| December 13, 2016 | Royal Variety Performance | United Kingdom | "Million Reasons" | |
| December 20, 2016 | Tony Bennett Celebrates 90: The Best Is Yet to Come | United States | "The Lady Is a Tramp"; "La Vie en rose"; "Happy Birthday to You" / "Happy Birthday" / "Signed, Sealed, Delivered I'm Yours" (with Stevie Wonder) | |
| April 10, 2018 | Elton John: I'm Still Standing – A Grammy Salute | United States | "Your Song" | |
| April 18, 2020 | One World: Together At Home † | Various | "Smile"; "The Prayer" (with Celine Dion, Andrea Bocelli, Lang Lang and John Legend) | |
| May 27, 2021 | Friends: The Reunion | United States | "Smelly Cat" (with Lisa Kudrow as Phoebe Buffay) | |
| November 28, 2021 (Note: Recorded on August 3–5, 2021.) | One Last Time: An Evening with Tony Bennett and Lady Gaga † | United States | "Luck Be a Lady"; "Orange Colored Sky"; "Let's Do It"; "New York, New York"; "The Lady Is a Tramp"; "Love for Sale"; "Anything Goes" (with Tony Bennett) | |
| December 16, 2021 | MTV Unplugged | United States | "Night and Day"; "Love for Sale"; "I've Got You Under My Skin" (with Tony Bennett); "Let's Do It" | |
| May 25, 2024 (Note: Recorded from The Chromatica Ball on September 10, 2022.) | Gaga Chromatica Ball † | United States | "Bad Romance"; "Just Dance"; "Poker Face"; "Alice"; "Replay"; "Monster"; "911"; "Sour Candy"; "Telephone"; "LoveGame"; "Babylon"; "Free Woman"; "Born This Way"; "Shallow"; "Always Remember Us This Way"; "The Edge of Glory"; "Angel Down"; "Fun Tonight"; "Enigma"; "Stupid Love"; "Rain on Me"; "Hold My Hand" | |
| October 1, 2024 | Jimmy Kimmel Live! | United States | "Happy Mistake" | |
| December 15, 2024 | A Carpool Karaoke Christmas | United States | "Last Christmas"; "Disease"; "Christmas Tree"; "Highway to Hell" (with Brian Johnson); "Die with a Smile"; "Black Dog"; "Shallow"; "Santa Claus Is Comin' to Town" | |
| February 14, 2025 | SNL50: The Homecoming Concert | United States | "Shallow" / "Dick in a Box" / "Motherlover" / "Jizz in My Pants" (with The Lonely Island); "Shallow" | |
| March 8, 2025 | Saturday Night Live | United States | "Abracadabra"; "Killah" | |
| May 31, 2025 | Netflix Tudum | United States | "Zombieboy"; "Bloody Mary"; "Abracadabra" | |
| September 8, 2025 | The Late Show with Stephen Colbert | United States | "Vanish into You" | |

== Radio broadcasts ==
List of radio performances, showing the station/show names, dates, locations, and performed songs
| Date | Station/Show | Country | Performed song(s) | Ref. |
|---|---|---|---|---|
| February 10, 2009 | Planet Radio | Germany | "Poker Face" | |
| February 25, 2009 | NRJ | France | "Just Dance"; "Poker Face" | |
| February 27, 2009 | Fun Radio | France | "Eh, Eh (Nothing Else I Can Say)" | |
| March 8, 2009 | KIIS-FM | United States | "Out on the Weekend" / "Fooled Me Again"; "Poker Face"; "Paparazzi" | |
| March 23, 2009 | KDWB-FM | United States | "Poker Face"; "Fooled Me Again" | |
| March 24, 2009 | B96 | United States | "Poker Face" | |
| April 20, 2009 | BBC Radio 1 Live Lounge | United Kingdom | "Poker Face"; "Viva la Vida" | |
| April 22, 2009 | Capital FM | United Kingdom | "Paparazzi"; "Poker Face" | |
| April 27, 2009 | Fun Radio | France | "Just Dance"; "Paparazzi"; "Poker Face" | |
| May 21, 2009 | Nova 96.9 | Australia | "Paparazzi" | |
| September 9, 2009 | NRJ | France | "Eh, Eh (Nothing Else I Can Say)" | |
| July 18, 2011 | The Howard Stern Show | United States | "The Edge of Glory"; "Hair" | |
| July 26, 2011 | 97.1 AMP Radio | United States | "The Edge of Glory"; "You and I" | |
| July 26, 2011 | JoJo on the Radio | United States | "The Edge of Glory"; "You and I" | |
| November 12, 2013 | The Howard Stern Show | United States | "Dope"; "Gypsy" | |
| December 2, 2014 | The Howard Stern Show | United States | "Lush Life" | |
| October 3, 2016 | Mornings with Carson Daly | United States | "Perfect Illusion" | |
| October 4, 2016 | On Air with Ryan Seacrest | United States | "Just Another Day"; "Perfect Illusion" | |
| October 24, 2016 | The Howard Stern Show | United States | "Black Dog"; "Million Reasons" | |
| November 29, 2016 | C'Cauet | France | "Million Reasons"; "Just Another Day" | |
| December 10, 2016 | Nova 96.9 | Australia | "Million Reasons" | |
| June 24, 2019 | SiriusXM + Pandora Present Lady Gaga at The Apollo (Note: A selection from this performance was included in the Live from the Apollo EP.) | United States | "Just Dance"; "Poker Face"; "LoveGame"; "Dance in the Dark"; "Telephone"; "Applause"; "Paparazzi"; "Aura"; "The Edge of Glory"; "Alejandro"; "Million Reasons"; "You and I"; "Bad Romance"; "Born This Way"; "Shallow" | |
| March 11, 2025 | The Howard Stern Show | United States | "Abracadabra"; "Perfect Celebrity" | |
| October 3, 2025 | KCRW | United States | "Abracadabra"; "Vanish into You" | |

== Benefit and political events ==
List of benefit and political events, showing event names, dates, locations, and songs performed
| Date | Event | Venue | Location | Performed song(s) | Ref. |
|---|---|---|---|---|---|
| October 5, 2009 | An Evening with Gavin Friday and Friends | Carnegie Hall | New York City | "Poker Face" | |
| October 10, 2009 | Human Rights Campaign Dinner | Walter E. Washington Convention Center | Washington, D.C. | "Imagine" | |
| February 10, 2010 | amfAR Gala | Cipriani 42nd Street | New York City | "Future Love" | |
| May 3, 2010 | Met Gala | Metropolitan Museum of Art | New York City | "Alejandro"; "Bad Romance" | |
| May 13, 2010 | Rock for the Rainforest | Carnegie Hall | New York City | "Stand by Me" / "King of Pain" (with Sting); "Speechless" / "Your Song" (with Elton John); "Don't Stop Believin'" (with Sting, Shirley Bassey, Debbie Harry, Bruce Springsteen and Elton John) | |
| June 24, 2010 | White Tie & Tiara Ball | Old Windsor | Berkshire, England | "Dance in the Dark"; "Just Dance"; "Beautiful, Dirty, Rich"; "Teeth"; "Alejandro"; "Speechless" / "Your Song" (with Elton John); "Telephone"; "You and I"; "Poker Face"; "Bad Romance" | |
| May 9, 2011 | Robin Hood Foundation Gala | Javits Center | New York City | "Speechless"; "You and I"; "Americano"; "Alejandro"; "Judas"; "Orange Colored Sky"; "Born This Way"; "Bad Romance" | |
| June 11, 2011 | Europride | Circus Maximus | Rome, Italy | "Born This Way"; "The Edge of Glory" | |
| October 15, 2011 | A Decade of Difference: A Concert Celebrating 10 Years of the William J. Clinton Foundation | Hollywood Bowl | Los Angeles, California | "Born This Way"; "The Edge of Glory"; "Bad Romance"; "You and I" | |
| November 17, 2011 | Children in Need Rocks Manchester | Manchester Arena | Manchester, England | "Born This Way"; "The Edge of Glory"; "Marry the Night" | |
| November 30, 2011 | Concert for Grammy Museum's Educational Initiatives | Grammy Museum at L.A. Live | Los Angeles, California | "Marry the Night"; "You and I" | |
| November 25, 2012 | Performance for the students promoted by UNICEF | 5123 Francisco Bolognesi School | Lima, Peru | "Born This Way" | |
| January 22, 2013 | Barack Obama Staff Inaugural Ball | The White House | Washington, D.C. | "The Edge of Glory"; "Born This Way"; "The Lady Is a Tramp" (with Tony Bennett); "You and I" | |
| June 28, 2013 | NYC Pride March Kick Off Rally | Pier 26 | New York City | "The Star-Spangled Banner" | |
| June 24, 2015 | Hillary Clinton presidential campaign fundraiser (with Tony Bennett) | Plaza Hotel | New York City | Unknown | |
| October 10, 2015 | Columbus Citizens Foundation Gala | Waldorf Astoria | New York City | "La Vie en rose"; "'O sole mio" (with Tony Bennett) | |
| October 29, 2015 | amfAR Gala | Milk Studios | Los Angeles, California | "I Can't Give You Anything but Love, Baby"; "Bewitched, Bothered and Bewildered"; "Lush Life"; "Bang Bang (My Baby Shot Me Down)"; "Til It Happens to You"; "La Vie en rose"; "Call Me Irresponsible" | |
| April 7, 2016 | It's On Us Rally | Cox Pavilion | Paradise, Nevada | "Til It Happens to You" | |
| April 13, 2016 | Parker Institute for Cancer Immunotherapy launch | Parker Institute | Los Angeles, California | "New York, New York"; "Call Me Irresponsible"; "La Vie en rose"; "Let's Face the Music and Dance"; "Coquette"; "You and I"; "Bad Romance" | |
| July 17, 2016 | Performance for the orphans | Casa Hogar | Cabo San Lucas, Mexico | "Born This Way" | |
| July 28, 2016 | Camden Rising - The Democratic National Convention Concert | BB&T Pavilion | Camden, New Jersey | "This Land Is Your Land"; "Old Man"; "Bang Bang (My Baby Shot Me Down)"; "The War Is Over"; "Smile"; "Bad Romance"; "Born This Way"; "You and I"; "Come Together"; "La Vie en rose" | |
| November 7, 2016 | Hillary Clinton presidential campaign final rally | Reynolds Coliseum | Raleigh, North Carolina | "Come to Mama"; "Bad Romance"; "Angel Down"; "Born This Way"; "Livin' on a Prayer" (with Jon Bon Jovi) | |
| November 25, 2016 | Performance for the homeless LGBT youth | Ali Forney Center | New York City | "Million Reasons" | |
| October 21, 2017 | Deep from the Heart: The One America Appeal Concert | Reed Arena | College Station, Texas | "Million Reasons"; "You and I"; "The Edge of Glory" | |
| November 2, 2020 | Joe Biden presidential campaign final rally | Heinz Field | Pittsburgh | "Shallow"; "You and I" | |
| January 20, 2021 | Inauguration of Joe Biden | United States Capitol | Washington, D.C. | "The Star-Spangled Banner" | |
| November 4, 2024 | Kamala Harris presidential campaign Vote for Freedom final rally | Philadelphia Museum of Art | Philadelphia, Pennsylvania | "God Bless America"; "The Edge of Glory" | |
| January 30, 2025 | FireAid | Intuit Dome | Los Angeles, California | "Shallow"; "Always Remember Us This Way"; "Time Is a Healer" (Note: This song was specially written for this concert.) | |

== Sporting events ==
List of sporting event performances, showing event names, dates, locations, and songs performed
| Date | Event | Venue | Location | Performed song(s) | Ref. |
|---|---|---|---|---|---|
| February 22, 2009 | Italian Basketball Cup 2008–09 Serie A season final halftime show | Futurshow Station | Casalecchio di Reno, Italy | "Poker Face"; "Just Dance" | |
| October 30, 2011 | Formula One Indian Grand Prix after party | Buddh International Circuit | Greater Noida, India | "Born This Way"; "Judas"; "Marry the Night"; "Poker Face"; "The Edge of Glory"; "Bad Romance | |
| June 12, 2015 | 2015 European Games opening ceremony | Olympic Stadium | Baku, Azerbaijan | "Imagine" | |
| February 7, 2016 | Super Bowl 50 pregame | Levi's Stadium | Santa Clara, California | "The Star-Spangled Banner" | |
| February 5, 2017 | Super Bowl LI halftime show | NRG Stadium | Houston, Texas | "God Bless America" / "This Land Is Your Land"; "Poker Face"; "Born This Way"; "Telephone"; "Just Dance"; "Million Reasons"; "Bad Romance" | |
| February 1, 2020 | AT&T Super Saturday Night | Meridian | Miami, Florida | "Just Dance"; "Poker Face"; "LoveGame"; "Dance in the Dark"; "Telephone"; "Applause"; "Paparazzi"; "Aura"; "The Edge of Glory"; "Alejandro"; "Million Reasons"; "You and I"; "Bad Romance"; "Born This Way"; "Shallow" | |
| February 10, 2024 | Mark Davis The Dinner Show Super Bowl party | Fontainebleau Las Vegas | Winchester, Nevada | "Shallow"; "Bad Romance"; "Born This Way"; "Stupid Love"; "Poker Face"; "The Best Is Yet to Come"; "New York, New York"; "La Vie en rose" | |
| July 26, 2024 | 2024 Summer Olympics opening ceremony | Seine river | Paris, France | "Mon truc en plumes" | |
| February 9, 2025 | Super Bowl LIX pregame | Bourbon Street | New Orleans, Louisiana | "Hold My Hand" | |
| February 8, 2026 | Super Bowl LX halftime show | Levi's Stadium | Santa Clara, California | "Die with a Smile" | |

== Web performances ==
List of web performances, showing event names, dates, and songs performed
| Date | Event | Performed song(s) | Ref. |
|---|---|---|---|
| August 1, 2008 | Yahoo!'s Who's Next | "Just Dance"; "LoveGame" | |
| November 23, 2008 | Live at the Cherrytree House (Note: A selection from this performance was included in The Cherrytree Sessions EP.) | "Brown Eyes"; "Just Dance"; "Poker Face"; "Eh, Eh (Nothing Else I Can Say)" | |
| March 6, 2009 | AOL Sessions | "Poker Face" (Acoustic Version); "Beautiful, Dirty, Rich"; "LoveGame"; "Poker Face"; "Paparazzi"; "Just Dance" | |
| May 31, 2009 | Walmart Soundcheck | "Poker Face"; "Just Dance"; "LoveGame"; "Beautiful, Dirty, Rich" | |
| December 8, 2009 | Vevo launch event | "Speechless" | |
| October 24, 2013 | The AMPYA Moment with Lady Gaga | "Gypsy"; "Do What U Want" (a cappella) | |
| June 24, 2020 | Paper x Club Quarantine Presents: Lady Gaga's Chromatica Fundrager | "Scheiße" / "Born This Way"; "G.U.Y."; "Plastic Doll"; "Electric Chapel" (DJ set) | |
| November 23, 2020 | Lupus Research Alliance Gala | "Joanne" (Note: Pre-recorded live from the Joanne World Tour in 2018.) | |
| September 30, 2021 | Lady Gaga Celebrates Love for Sale presented by Westfield | "Luck Be a Lady"; "Orange Colored Sky" (with Brian Newman); "Love for Sale"; "Call Me Irresponsible"; "Poker Face"; "Bang Bang (My Baby Shot Me Down)"; "I Can't Give You Anything but Love, Baby"; "Night and Day"; "Born This Way"; "Let's Do It"; "La Vie en rose"; "Fly Me to the Moon"; "New York, New York" | |
| February 22, 2024 | Fortnite Festival – Season 2 ("Unlock Your Talent") | "Just Dance"; "Applause"; "Poker Face"; "Bloody Mary"; "Stupid Love"; "The Edge of Glory"; "Born This Way"; "Rain on Me" | |
| November 13, 2024 | The Antidote Live | "Disease" | |
| November 20, 2024 | The Poison Live | "Disease" | |

== Other performances ==
List of miscellaneous live performances, showing event, dates, locations, and songs performed where available
| Date | Event | Venue | Location | Performed song(s) | Ref. |
|---|---|---|---|---|---|
| March 27, 2008 | Winter Music Conference | Raleigh Hotel | Miami Beach, Florida | "Beautiful, Dirty, Rich"; "Paparazzi"; "Just Dance" | |
| June 26, 2008 | Miss Sixty Fall Fashion Preview | Miss Sixty Store | Miami Beach, Florida | "LoveGame"; "Beautiful, Dirty, Rich"; "Poker Face"; "Just Dance" | |
| October 14, 2008 | Fashion at the Park | NorthPark Center | Dallas, Texas | "Beautiful, Dirty, Rich”; "Poker Face"; "Just Dance" | |
| July 9, 2009 | NRJ Sessions | Alhambra | Paris, France | "Willkommen"; "Paparazzi"; "Brown Eyes"; "Eh, Eh (Nothing Else I Can Say)"; "Poker Face" | |
| September 14, 2009 | Marc Jacobs New York Fashion Week Party | Hiro Ballroom | New York City | "Poker Face"; "Just Dance" | |
| November 4, 2009 | Ballets Russes Italian Style (the Shortest Musical You Will Never See Again) | Museum of Contemporary Art | Los Angeles, California | "Speechless" (Performance art by Francesco Vezzoli) | |
| December 31, 2009 | New Year's Eve Countdown Party | Fontainebleau Miami Beach | Miami Beach, Florida | "Bad Romance"; "Just Dance"; "Monster"; "Poker Face" | |
| April 20, 2010 | GAGAKOH | Tabloid Club | Tokyo, Japan | "Speechless"; "Alejandro"; "Bad Romance" (Performance art with Terence Koh) | |
| February 13, 2011 | 53rd Annual Grammy Awards Afterparty | L'Ermitage | Beverly Hills, California | "You and I" | |
| March 12, 2011 | Surprise performance | Connections Club | Louisville, Kentucky | "Born This Way" | |
| March 13, 2011 | Surprise performance | Round Up Saloon | Dallas, Texas | "Born This Way" | |
| March 14, 2011 | Surprise performance | Station 4 | Dallas, Texas | "Born This Way" | |
| March 18, 2011 | Surprise performance | The Max | Omaha, Nebraska | "Born This Way" | |
| March 24, 2011 | Surprise performance | Krave | Las Vegas, Nevada | "Born This Way" | |
| March 28, 2011 | Lady Gaga 25th Birthday Party | La Cita Bar | Los Angeles, California | "Born This Way" (with Mariachi Sol de Mexico) | |
| April 17, 2011 | Surprise performance | Kennedy Lounge | Tampa, Florida | "Judas" | |
| May 12, 2011 | Belvedere Vodka Born This Way Party | Annabel's | London, England | "Speechless"; "Born This Way"; "Orange Colored Sky"; "You and I" | |
| June 15, 2011 | The Little Monsters Video Awards Party | Le Club 1515 | Paris, France | "Born This Way"; "You and I"; "The Edge of Glory" | |
| July 11, 2011 | Surprise performance | Nevermind | Sydney, Australia | "Born This Way"; "Judas"; "The Edge of Glory" | |
| July 11, 2011 | Surprise performance | Arq Nightclub | Sydney, Australia | "The Edge of Glory"; "Born This Way"; "Black Jesus + Amen Fashion"; "Judas" | |
| September 1, 2013 | Surprise performance | Boujis | London, England | "Jewels n' Drugs" (with T.I.); "Sexxx Dreams"; "Ratchet" | |
| September 7, 2013 | V magazine New York Fashion Week Party | (Le) Poisson Rouge | New York City | "Aura"; "Artpop"; "Sexxx Dreams"; "Swine"; "Applause" | |
| October 26, 2013 | Surprise performance | G-A-Y | London, England | "Venus" | |
| December 6, 2013 | Belvedere Vodka Artpop Party | Annabel's | London, England | "Bad Romance"; "Poker Face"; "Do What U Want"; "Dope" | |
| June 16, 2014 | Students Masterclass | Frank Sinatra School of the Arts | New York City | "Ev'ry Time We Say Goodbye"; "I Can't Give You Anything but Love"; "Cheek to Cheek" (with Tony Bennett) | |
| September 5, 2014 | Harper's Bazaar New York Fashion Week Party | Plaza Hotel | New York City | "I Can't Give You Anything but Love"; "Lush Life"; "Bang Bang (My Baby Shot Me Down)"; "It Don't Mean a Thing (If It Ain't Got That Swing)" | |
| December 4, 2014 | Bloomberg Businessweek 85th Anniversary (with Tony Bennett) | American Museum of Natural History | New York City | Unknown | |
| January 5, 2015 | William Morris Endeavor Party | Belly Up Tavern | Solana Beach, California | "Cheek to Cheek"; "It Don't Mean a Thing (If It Ain't Got That Swing)" (with Tony Bennett) | |
| March 22, 2015 | 13th Geffen Playhouse Gala | Geffen Playhouse | Los Angeles, California | "You and I" | |
| June 9, 2015 | Surprise performance | Ronnie Scott's Jazz Club | London, England | "Bewitched, Bothered and Bewildered"; "Ev'ry Time We Say Goodbye"; "Firefly"; "Orange Colored Sky"; "Bang Bang (My Baby Shot Me Down)"; "Lush Life"; "La Vie en rose" | |
| June 23, 2015 | Surprise performance | Rainbow Room | New York City | "Firefly"; "I Can't Give You Anything but Love"; "Bang Bang (My Baby Shot Me Down)"; "Bewitched, Bothered and Bewildered"; "Just a Gigolo"; "Ev'ry Time We Say Goodbye"; "Let's Face the Music and Dance"; "Orange Colored Sky" | |
| July 8, 2015 | Copenhagen Jazz Festival Afterparty | La Fontaine | Copenhagen, Denmark | "La Vie en rose" | |
| November 6, 2015 | Ron Baron Investment Conference | Metropolitan Opera House | New York City | "I Can't Give You Anything but Love"; "La Vie en rose"; "Nature Boy"; "Anything Goes" (with Tony Bennett) | |
| December 1, 2015 | The Hunting Ground Reception | Peninsula Hotel | Beverly Hills, California | "Til It Happens to You" | |
| January 5, 2016 | The Hunting Ground Reception | Peninsula Hotel | Beverly Hills, California | "Til It Happens to You" | |
| January 6, 2016 | CES 2016 Afterparty | SLS Las Vegas | Las Vegas, Nevada | "New York, New York"; "Coquette"; "La Vie en rose"; "Bang Bang (My Baby Shot Me Down)"; "Is You Is or Is You Ain't My Baby"; "Firefly"; "Let's Face the Music and Dance" | |
| February 17, 2016 | V magazine New York Fashion Week Party | Rainbow Room | New York City | "La Vie en rose"; "Call Me Irresponsible" | |
| April 4, 2016 | Jane Ortner Education Award Luncheon | Grammy Museum at L.A. Live | Los Angeles, California | "New York, New York"; "I Can't Give You Anything but Love, Baby"; "Let's Face the Music and Dance"; "Call Me Irresponsible"; "La Vie en rose"; "Til It Happens to You" | |
| May 2, 2016 | Met Gala Afterparty | Up & Down | New York City | "Burning Down the House" (with Mark Ronson) | |
| August 17, 2016 | iHeartMedia Music Summit | iHeartRadio Theater | New York City | "Perfect Illusion"; "Joanne" | |
| September 10, 2016 | Surprise performance | Moth Club | London, England | "Perfect Illusion"; "Bad Romance" | |
| October 19, 2016 | T magazine "The Greats" Party | Carlyle Hotel | New York City | "Angel Down" | |
| November 20, 2016 | Airbnb Open Spotlight | Downtown | Los Angeles | "Million Reasons"; "Bad Romance" | |
| December 1, 2016 | Westfield Intimate Gig | Westfield Shepherd's Bush | London, England | "Bad Romance"; "Joanne"; "Million Reasons" | |
| July 1, 2017 | Lolita Osmanova and Gaspar Avdolyan Wedding Party | Dolby Theatre | Los Angeles, California | "Bad Romance"; "The Edge of Glory"; "Paparazzi"; "Poker Face"; "Born This Way"; "Million Reasons"; "Marry the Night" | |
| September 8, 2017 | 2017 Toronto International Film Festival | Princess of Wales Theatre | Toronto, Canada | "Bad Romance" | |
| December 26, 2018 | Enigma Rehearsals | Dolby Live | Paradise, Nevada | "Million Reasons"; "Shallow" | |
| May 9, 2019 | Sapphire Now and ASUG Annual Conference | Amway Center | Orlando, Florida | "Just Dance"; "Poker Face"; "LoveGame"; "Dance in the Dark"; "Telephone"; "Applause"; "Paparazzi"; "Aura"; "The Edge of Glory"; "Alejandro"; "Million Reasons"; "You and I"; "Bad Romance"; "Born This Way"; "Shallow" | |
| May 17, 2019 | Apple Park Opening | Apple Park | Cupertino, California | "Just Dance"; "Poker Face"; "LoveGame"; "Dance in the Dark"; "Telephone"; "Applause"; "Paparazzi"; "Aura"; "The Edge of Glory"; "Alejandro"; "Million Reasons"; "You and I"; "Bad Romance"; "Born This Way"; "Shallow" | |
| May 20, 2019 | Amway's 60th Anniversary | Mandalay Bay Resort & Casino | Las Vegas | "Just Dance"; "Poker Face"; "LoveGame"; "Dance in the Dark"; "Telephone"; "Applause"; "Paparazzi"; "Aura"; "The Edge of Glory"; "Alejandro"; "Million Reasons"; "You and I"; "Bad Romance"; "Born This Way"; "Shallow" | |
| September 25, 2021 | Academy Museum of Motion Pictures Opening | Academy Museum of Motion Pictures | Los Angeles, California | "Luck Be a Lady"; "What a Diff'rence a Day Makes"; "La Vie en rose"; "Let's Do It" | |
| June 25, 2022 | Alan Howard and Caroline Byron Wedding Party | Villa Olmo | Como, Italy | "Luck Be a Lady"; "Bad Romance"; "Always Remember Us This Way"; "Shallow"; "Born This Way"; "Mambo Italiano" | |
| June 22, 2024 | Nemacolin Summer Solstice Party | Nemacolin Woodlands Resort | Pittsburgh, Pennsylvania | "Steppin' Out with My Baby"; "I Can't Give You Anything but Love"; "La Vie en rose"; "You and I"; "Bad Romance"; "Stupid Love"; "Sway"; "Americano"; "Shallow"; "Always Remember Us This Way"; "Born This Way" | |
| May 2, 2025 | Mayhem on the Beach public rehearsals | Copacabana Beach | Rio de Janeiro, Brazil | "How Bad Do U Want Me"; "Shallow"; "Vanish into You"; "Bloody Mary"; "Abracadabra"; "Judas"; "Scheiße"; "Garden of Eden"; "Poker Face"; "Perfect Celebrity"; "Disease"; "Paparazzi"; "Alejandro" | |
| May 14, 2025 | YouTube Brandcast | David Geffen Hall | New York City | "Abracadabra"; "Perfect Celebrity"; "How Bad Do U Want Me"; "Shallow"; "Vanish into You" | |

== Guest appearances ==
=== As opening act ===
List of concert tours as opening act, showing dates and headlining artist(s)
| Dates | Artist | Tour | Location | Shows | Performed songs | Ref. |
|---|---|---|---|---|---|---|
| October 8, 2008 – December 4, 2008 | New Kids on the Block | New Kids on the Block Live | North America | 26 | "Beautiful, Dirty, Rich"; "LoveGame"; "Paparazzi"; "Starstruck"; "Poker Face"; "Just Dance" | |
| October 8, 2008 – December 4, 2008 | New Kids on the Block | New Kids on the Block Live | North America | 26 | "Big Girl Now" (with the group during the show on select dates) | |
| January 18, 2009 – May 30, 2009 | The Pussycat Dolls | Doll Domination Tour | Europe; Oceania | 32 | "Paparazzi"; "LoveGame"; "Beautiful, Dirty, Rich"; "The Fame"; "Just Dance"; "Poker Face" | |
| July 4, 2009 – July 5, 2009 | Take That | Take That Presents: The Circus Live | London, England (Wembley Stadium) | 2 | "Paparazzi"; "LoveGame"; "Beautiful, Dirty, Rich"; "The Fame"; "Just Dance"; "Brown Eyes"; "Poker Face" | |

=== As featured act ===
List of appearances as featured act, showing main artist, dates, locations, and performed songs
| Date | Artist | Event | Location | Performed song(s) | Ref. |
|---|---|---|---|---|---|
| June 16, 2010 | Brian Newman | After Dark | New York City (Duane Park) | "Someone to Watch Over Me" | |
| September 29, 2010 | Brian Newman | After Dark | New York City (Oak Room) | "Orange Colored Sky"; "Someone to Watch Over Me"; "Ev'ry Time We Say Goodbye" | |
| October 2, 2010 | Plastic Ono Band | We Are the Plastic Ono Band | Los Angeles (Orpheum Theatre) | "The Sun Is Down!"; "It's Been Very Hard"; "Give Peace a Chance" | |
| January 5, 2011 | Brian Newman | After Dark | New York City (Oak Room) | "Orange Colored Sky"; "Someone to Watch Over Me" | |
| October 1, 2011 | Sting | Sixtieth Birthday Celebration | New York City (Beacon Theatre) | "King of Pain" | |
| May 12, 2012 | Delfina Oliver | Jazz at New York Bar | Tokyo, Japan (New York Bar) | "Orange Colored Sky" | |
| December 15, 2012 | The Rolling Stones | 50 & Counting | Newark, New Jersey (Prudential Center) | "Gimme Shelter" | |
| May 9, 2013 | Brian Newman | Rose Bar Residency | New York City (Rose Bar) | "Someone to Watch Over Me" | |
| July 1, 2014 | Tony Bennett | Montreal International Jazz Festival | Montreal, Canada (Salle Wilfrid-Pelletier) | "But Beautiful"; "Lush Life"; "It Don't Mean a Thing (If It Ain't Got That Swing)" | |
| July 28, 2014 | Brian Newman | Magic Monday Jeromes | New York City (Rivington F+B) | "Bang Bang (My Baby Shot Me Down)"; "I Can't Give You Anything but Love" | |
| August 27, 2014 | Queen + Adam Lambert | Tour 2014–2015 | Sydney, Australia (Allphones Arena) | "Another One Bites the Dust" | |
| June 20, 2015 | The Dirty Pearls | Live at the Gramercy Theatre | New York City (Gramercy Theatre) | "Who's Coming Back to Who"; "Sucker for a Sequel"; "Blitzkrieg Bop"; "Hot for Teacher"; "Applause"; "Rebel Yell"; "Panama" | |
| July 4, 2015 | Brian Newman | Monte-Carlo Sporting Summer Festival Afterparty | Monte Carlo, Monaco (Hôtel de Paris) | "La Vie en rose"; "Bang Bang (My Baby Shot Me Down)" | |
| July 26, 2015 | U2 | Innocence + Experience Tour | New York City (Madison Square Garden) | "Ordinary Love" | |
| July 29, 2015 | Brian Newman | Jazz Jam | Atlanta, Georgia (Churchill Grounds) | "Bang Bang (My Baby Shot Me Down)"; "Orange Colored Sky"; "La Vie en rose" | |
| February 18, 2016 | Brian Newman | Rose Bar Residency | New York City (Rose Bar) | "Call Me Irresponsible"; "La Vie en rose" | |
| February 27, 2016 | Elton John | Live on the Sunset Strip | Los Angeles (Sunset Boulevard) | "Don't Let the Sun Go Down on Me" | |
| July 26, 2016 | Brian Newman | Rose Bar Residency | New York City (Rose Bar) | "I Can't Give You Anything but Love"; "La Vie en rose"; "Bang Bang (My Baby Shot Me Down)"; "Just a Gigolo"; "Smile" | |
| August 3, 2016 | Tony Bennett | Ninetieth Birthday Celebration | New York City (Rainbow Room) | "New York, New York"; "Smile"; "Lush Life"; "I Can't Give You Anything but Love"; "I Left My Heart in San Francisco"; "La Vie en rose"; "'O sole mio"; "Bang Bang (My Baby Shot Me Down)"; "Bad Romance"; "Happy Birthday"; "I Wish"; "You Are the Sunshine of My Life" (with Stevie Wonder) | |
| March 25, 2017 | Elton John | Seventieth Birthday Celebration | Los Angeles (Red Studios Hollywood) | "Born This Way"; "Bad Romance"; "Happy Birthday to You" (with Stevie Wonder) | |
| July 15, 2017 | Tony Bennett | Live with the Los Angeles Philharmonic and Gustavo Dudamel | Los Angeles (Hollywood Bowl) | "The Lady Is a Tramp"; "Cheek to Cheek" | |
| September 1, 2017 | Brian Newman | After Hours | Boston, Massachusetts (House of Blues) | "Coquette" | |
| September 2, 2017 | Brian Newman | After Hours | Boston, Massachusetts (House of Blues) | "I Can't Give You Anything but Love"; "Coquette"; "What a Diff'rence a Day Makes"; "Call Me Irresponsible"; "Let's Face the Music and Dance"; "Just a Gigolo" | |
| December 5, 2017 | Brian Newman | After Hours | Austin, Texas (Antone's) | "I Can't Give You Anything but Love"; "Ev'ry Time We Say Goodbye" | |
| May 24, 2018 | Brian Newman | Rose Bar Residency | New York City (Rose Bar) | "I Can't Give You Anything but Love"; "Let's Face the Music and Dance"; "Ev'ry Time We Say Goodbye"; "Just a Gigolo"; "Bang Bang (My Baby Shot Me Down)"; "Cheek to Cheek" | |
| June 23, 2018 | Tony Bennett | 2018 summer concerts | Vienna, Virginia (Wolf Trap Filene Center) | "Cheek to Cheek"; "The Lady Is a Tramp" | |
| March 14, 2019 | Fred Durst | Thursday Jazz Nights | Hollywood, California (Black Rabbit Rose) | "Call Me Irresponsible"; "Fly Me to the Moon" | |
| June 2, 2019 | Brian Newman | After Dark | Paradise, Nevada (NoMad Bar) | "Don't Let Me Be Misunderstood" | |
| June 9, 2019 | Brian Newman | After Dark | Paradise, Nevada (NoMad Bar) | "Happy Birthday to You"; "Don't Let Me Be Misunderstood"; "Fly Me to the Moon"; "3-Way (The Golden Rule)"; "I Can't Give You Anything but Love"; "Luck Be a Lady"; "Call Me Irresponsible" | |
| June 15, 2019 | Brian Newman | After Dark | Paradise, Nevada (NoMad Bar) | "Fly Me to the Moon"; "Call Me Irresponsible"; "Just a Gigolo" | |
| October 27, 2019 | Brian Newman | After Dark | Paradise, Nevada (NoMad Bar) | "Fly Me to the Moon"; "Call Me Irresponsible"; "Just a Gigolo"; "I've Got You Under My Skin" (with Jaclyn McSpadden); "Foolish" / "Happy" (with Ashanti) | |
| November 9, 2019 | Brian Newman | After Dark | Paradise, Nevada (NoMad Bar) | "Is You Is or Is You Ain't My Baby"; "Call Me Irresponsible"; "I Can't Give You Anything but Love" | |
| January 1, 2020 | Brian Newman | After Dark | Paradise, Nevada (NoMad Bar) | "Is You Is or Is You Ain't My Baby"; "Fly Me to the Moon"; "Call Me Irresponsible" | |
| October 19, 2023 | The Rolling Stones | Live at Racket, NYC | New York City (Racket) | "Sweet Sounds of Heaven" | |
| October 25, 2023 | U2 | U2:UV Achtung Baby Live at Sphere | Paradise, Nevada (Sphere) | "All I Want Is You"; "Shallow"; "I Still Haven't Found What I'm Looking For" | |
| August 15, 2024 | Bruno Mars | Intuit Dome inaugural shows | Inglewood, California (Intuit Dome) | "Die with a Smile" | |
| August 16, 2024 | Bruno Mars | Intuit Dome inaugural shows | Inglewood, California (Intuit Dome) | "Die with a Smile" | |
| August 27, 2024 | Bruno Mars | Bruno Mars at Park MGM | Paradise, Nevada (Dolby Live) | "Die with a Smile" | |
| August 28, 2024 | Bruno Mars | Surprise performance | Paradise, Nevada (The Pinky Ring) | "Die with a Smile" | |

== Cancelled performances ==
List of planned shows, showing accompanying artist, scheduled dates, location(s), number of shows, and reason for cancellation
| Scheduled dates | With | Title | Location(s) | Shows | Reason | Ref. |
|---|---|---|---|---|---|---|
| July 13, 2009 – March 6, 2010 | Michael Jackson | This Is It (as opening act) | London, England (The O2 Arena) | 50 | Death of Michael Jackson | |
| November 10, 2009 – January 24, 2010 | Kanye West | Fame Kills: Starring Kanye West and Lady Gaga | United States; Canada | 34 | 2009 MTV Video Music Awards incident between Kanye West and Taylor Swift and creative differences between the artists | |
