= Teeth (Lady Gaga song) =

2009 song by Lady Gaga

Song by Lady Gaga

from the EP The Fame Monster
- Released: November 18, 2009
- Recorded: September 2009
- Studio: Record Plant (Los Angeles)
- Genre: R&B
- Length: 3:41
- Label: Streamline; KonLive; Cherrytree; Interscope
- Songwriters: Lady Gaga; Taja Riley; Pete Wyoming Bender (Note: While Pete Wyoming Bender and Teddy Riley are not credited as songwriters of "Teeth" in the album liner notes, they are listed as songwriters by BMI.); Teddy Riley
- Producers: Lady Gaga; Teddy Riley

Audio video
- "Teeth" on YouTube

"Teeth" is a song recorded by American singer Lady Gaga. The track appears on The Fame Monster (2009), her second major release and her third EP. The song was written by Gaga, Taja Riley, Pete Wyoming Bender, and Teddy Riley, and produced by Gaga and Riley. The R&B song has an oral theme and has been called a "perverse" march and an ode to sadomasochism.

Upon its release on The Fame Monster, "Teeth" peaked at number 107 on the UK Singles Chart and received a mixed reception from critics. Gaga performed the song during the Monster Ball Tour (2009–2011) and her 2017 Coachella set. In 2013, Riley sued Gaga for US$500,000 and punitive damages over the songwriting credits, saying he was not given 25 percent of royalties as he had been promised.

== Background and composition ==
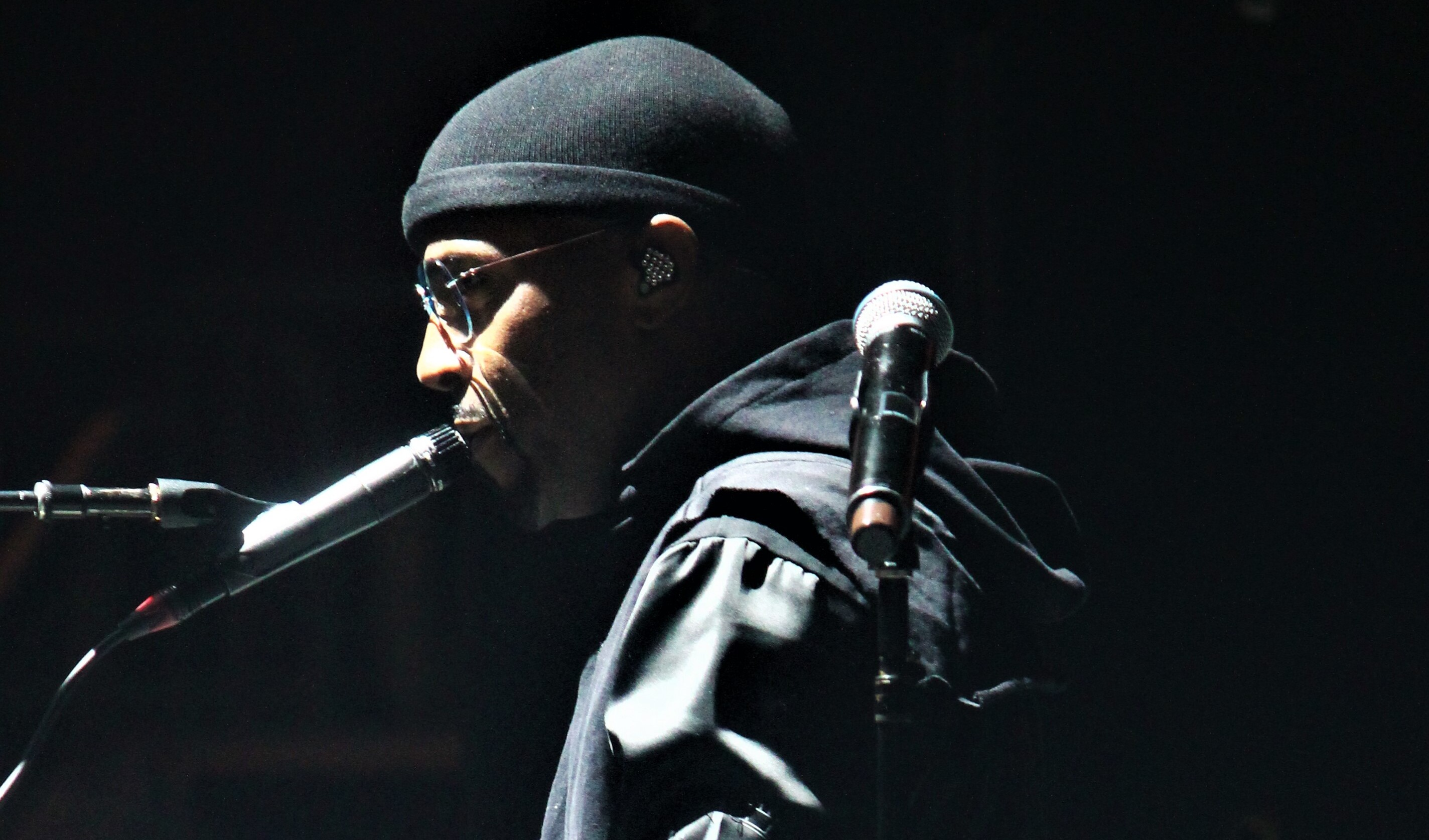
Teddy Riley (pictured in 2017) co-wrote and co-produced "Teeth".

"Teeth" was written by Lady Gaga, Taja Riley, Pete Wyoming Bender, and Teddy Riley, and was produced by Gaga and Teddy Riley. It has been described as a "perverse march" and a "gospel ode" to sadomasochism. Bradley Stern of MuuMuse said the song is "part musical, part country, and a little bit tribal in spots". Popjustice described "Teeth" as a "wobbly, stompy, bouncy marching song" that opens with the lyric "don't want no money, just want your sex" and later chants, "show me your teeth!"

Lyrically, Gaga asks her lover to display his teeth for her. According to MusicOMH, "In the background another voice intones strange messages, which may or may not revolve around dentistry". Music Times said the "skank-y" horns in the track exhibit Riley's work. In an interview with MTV, Gaga explained the meaning behind the song and its lyrics: "It is meant to mean two things, the first one kind of juvenile sexual provocative connotation is about oral sex, but also the monster in the song is fear of the truth. 'Show me your teeth' means 'tell me the truth' and I think that for a long time in my life that I replaced sex with the truth".

In 2013, Teddy Riley sued Gaga for US$500,000 and punitive damages over the songwriting credits, and said his daughter Taja "committed fraud and copyright abuse by earning a deal with EMI for her role in the song". Riley said he was not given the 25 percent of royalties he had been promised. He also tried to sue his daughter and said, "her participation in the creation of the composition, authorship, and ownership [of 'Teeth'] are all false and untrue". Music Times said Teddy Riley's work on "Teeth" was his only contribution to The Fame Monster and called the track the EP's "smallest".

== Reception ==
"Teeth" received a mixed reception from critics; some complimented the song and others called it the album's worst track. Gaga's vocals was compared to those of Christina Aguilera, particularly in her 2010 musical film Burlesque. Slant Magazine's Sal Cinquemani said the song "sounds like something from Michael Jackson's last studio album as sung by Christina Aguilera ... that the closest she gets to another human being involves being tied up and bitten is revealing". Blogcritics' Clayton Perry said "Teeth", along with the tracks "Monster" and "Telephone", "thump harder than anything she's released thus far". In his review for Consequence of Sound, Tony Hardy describes the song as a "repetitive chant which gets its point across in the first verse, rendering the rest of it almost redundant". Nick Levine of Digital Spy said "Teeth" is "the most sonically intriguing thing GaGa's put her name to, an ode to rough sex conducted over an intense, tribal production that recalls Cher's 'Half Breed' and Fleetwood Mac's 'Tusk'". Kristen S. Hé of Vulture described the track as a "funky, soulful stomper" and contrasted it with the EP's previous seven songs where Gaga confronted her fears, while in "Teeth" she became "ferocious in life and the bedroom".

MusicOMH called "Teeth" the album's "biggest curveball" and said in its review, "It doesn't really go anywhere, the chorus getting mixed in with the verses, but it's still a compellingly dancey listen and may be indicative of where she's heading next". MuuMuse's Bradley Stern described the song as a "stomping, hoot-and-holler-worthy chant-along" that invites listeners to "cut loose and ... well, sink their teeth into the music". He added, "It's an odd choice to end the album, though a surefire crowd pleaser for live shows if the addictive backing beat is anything to judge by". Popjustice rated the song six out of eight and said it "foray[ed] into Black Betty territory". PopMatters' Evan Sawdey called "Teeth" Gaga's "most sonically adventurous song yet". Nick Hyman of Under the Radar said the song was the worst on the album.

In 2017, Billboard ranked "Teeth" number six in its list of the 100 greatest "deep cuts" in 21st century pop music, writing that "what makes 'Teeth' so remarkable isn't its implied carnality... but the seething aggression lurking not far below the song's surface".

== Live performances and other appearances ==
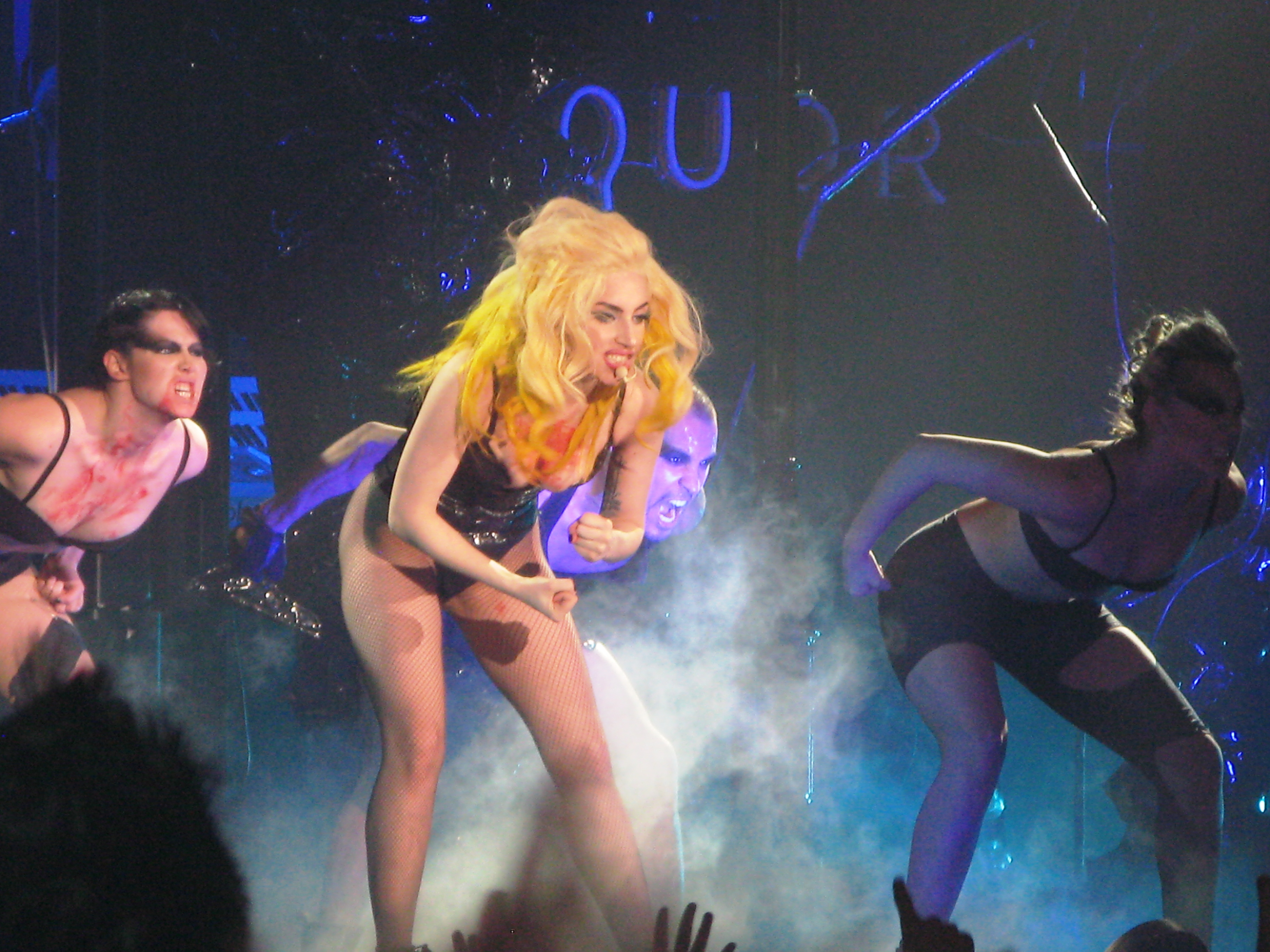
Lady Gaga performing "Teeth" on the Monster Ball Tour in Cardiff in 2010

Gaga performed "Teeth" during the Monster Ball Tour (2009–2011). The Riverfront Times said her January 2010 performance of the song in St. Louis was "fantastic" and described it as "a fierce Broadway strut full of vamps, vigor and choreographed dancing which recalled Chicago". Gaga performed an "angry version" of the song at Radio City Music Hall a few days later; she "hunched over in an animalistic crouch, surrounded by a predatory-looking pack of dancers" while images of a "ferocious" wolf were displayed. She grabbed her crotch and "snarled" to emphasize the song's lyrics; Dan Aquilante of the New York Post said these actions "didn’t seem all that inappropriate".

Gaga performed a "concert version" of the song at Lollapalooza in August 2010, during which a guitar solo was played between each iteration of the line, "Show me your teeth!". During some performances of the song, she told concert attendees she never lip syncs. In his review of Gaga's April 2011 performance in Montreal, Mike Lepage said the reminder was "needless" and wrote, "What idiot would actually have charged this canary-haired dynamo with that? If anything, you can’t shut the Gaga up, and she has both the chops and the pride to deliver it all live". In 2017, Gaga performed the song in her setlist for the 2017 Coachella Festival.

In 2011, Discovery Channel used "Teeth" to promote its Shark Week programming. Target Corporation was selling a "singing" toothbrush that plays two-minute excerpts of "Born This Way" and "Teeth".

== Credits and personnel ==
Credits adapted from the liner notes of The Fame Monster.

- Lady Gaga – vocals, songwriter, producer, background vocals
- Pete Wyoming Bender – songwriter
- Teddy Riley – producer, songwriter
- Taja Riley – songwriter
- Dave Russell – recording at Record Plant, Los Angeles, California, audio mixing at Mason Sound, North Hollywood, California
- Mike Daley – recording assistant

== Charts ==
Chart performance for "Teeth"
| Chart (2009) | Peak position |
|---|---|
| UK Singles (OCC) | 107 |
