= The Fame Monster =

2009 studio album reissue by Lady Gaga

- Deluxe edition cover (Note: Cover art for the double-disc release of The Fame Monster with The Fame.)

Studio album (reissue) and EP by Lady Gaga
- Released: November 17, 2009
- Recorded: 2009
- Studios: Record Plant, Darkchild (Los Angeles); FC Walvisch (Amsterdam); Metropolis (London); Studio Groove (Osaka)
- Genre: Electropop
- Length: 34:15
- Labels: Streamline; KonLive; Cherrytree; Interscope
- Producers: Ron Fair; Fernando Garibay; Rodney "Darkchild" Jerkins; Lady Gaga; RedOne; Teddy Riley; Space Cowboy

Lady Gaga chronology
Hitmixes (2009)	The Fame Monster (2009)	The Remix (2010)

Alternative cover
- EP cover (Note: Cover art for the single-disc release of The Fame Monster.)

Singles from The Fame Monster
- 1. "Bad Romance" Released: October 19, 2009; 2. "Telephone" Released: January 26, 2010; 3. "Alejandro" Released: April 20, 2010; 4. "Dance in the Dark" Released: August 25, 2010

The Fame Monster is a reissue of American singer Lady Gaga's debut studio album, The Fame (2008). (Note: The Fame Monster is occasionally counted as Gaga's second studio album separately from The Fame.) It was released on November 17, 2009, by Interscope Records, Streamline Records, KonLive Distribution, and Cherrytree Records. Initially planned solely as a deluxe edition reissue of The Fame, Interscope later decided to release the eight new songs as a standalone EP in some territories. The decision also reflected Gaga's view that the re-release was too expensive and that the albums were conceptually different; she described them as yin and yang. The deluxe edition is a double album featuring the eight new songs on the first disc and The Fame on the second disc. A super deluxe edition was released on December 15, 2009, containing additional merchandise, including a lock from Gaga's wig.

An electropop record, The Fame Monster incorporates influences from disco, glam rock, and 1970s and 1980s synth-pop, as well as industrial and gothic music. The album was also inspired by fashion shows and runways. According to Gaga, the album deals with the darker side of fame, with its theme lyrically expressed through a monster metaphor. The album's two covers were shot by Hedi Slimane. One of the covers has a Gothic theme and was initially declined for release by her record company, but Gaga persuaded them.

"Bad Romance", the album's lead single, was a commercial success, topping the charts in more than twenty countries and reaching number two on the Billboard Hot 100 in the US. The next two singles, "Telephone" and "Alejandro", reached the top ten in multiple countries worldwide, including the US. "Dance in the Dark" was released as a single only in select territories, achieving moderate chart success in the respective countries it was released in.

The Fame Monster received generally positive reviews from music critics. The album charted as The Fame in some countries and topped the charts in Australia, Belgium, Finland, New Zealand, and Poland. In the United States, the EP reached number five on the Billboard 200 and topped the Dance/Electronic Albums chart. It has since been certified five-times Platinum by the Recording Industry Association of America (RIAA). The album has won multiple awards since its release. It was nominated for six categories at the 53rd Annual Grammy Awards, including Gaga's second consecutive Album of the Year nomination. It won three, including Best Pop Vocal Album. To promote the album, Gaga embarked on The Monster Ball Tour (2009–2011), which became the highest-grossing tour in history by a debut headlining artist.

== Background and development ==
Lady Gaga released her debut studio album, The Fame, in 2008. Consisting of electropop and synthpop songs, the album commented on fame, the relationship between celebrities and fans, and wealthy lifestyles. After the worldwide success of The Fame, the idea of a re-release arose. However, Gaga felt that re-releases were a disservice to music artists because "it's artists sneaking singles onto an already finished piece of work in an effort to keep the album afloat." Her label, Interscope Records, initially wanted three songs for the project, titled The Fame Monster. Gaga had already composed a song, "Monster", by March 2009. She sought a darker and edgier concept than she had previously pursued, and cited her love of horror films and "the decay of the celebrity and the way that fame is a monster in society" as creative inspirations for The Fame Monster. Gaga explained in an interview with Daily Star:

I have an obsession with death and sex. Those two things are also the nexus of horror films, which I've been obsessing over lately. I’ve been watching horror movies and 1950s science fiction movies. My re-release is called The Fame Monster so I've just been sort of bulimically eating and regurgitating monster movies and all things scary. I've just been noticing a resurgence of this idea of monster, of fantasy, but in a very real way. If you notice in those films, there's always a juxtaposition of sex with death.

Unlike her debut album, the new record was inspired by the singer's personal experiences. The early musical direction was also shaped by Gaga's touring experiences with the Fame Ball Tour, during which she allegedly encountered "several monsters" that encapsulated her biggest fears. These fears were divided into various monster metaphors, such as the "Fear of Sex Monster", "Fear of Love Monster", "Fear of Alcohol Monster", and so forth. "I spent a lot of nights in Eastern Europe," the singer said. "And this album is a pop experimentation with industrial/Goth beats, 1990s dance melodies, an obsession with the lyrical genius of 1980s melancholic pop, and the runway". In an interview with MTV News, Gaga said that The Fame and The Fame Monster were like yin and yang because of their contrasting styles and concepts.

== Themes and composition ==
The standard edition of The Fame Monster contains eight tracks. The record showcases Gaga's taste for pastiche, drawing on "Seventies arena glam, perky ABBA disco, and sugary throwbacks like Stacey Q", according to Rolling Stone. Neil McCormick from The Daily Telegraph felt that while not as thematically unified as its predecessor, The Fame Monster had engaging songs composed by virtue of Gaga's "vivacious energy, bold melodies and almost comically relentless sensationalism". The lyrics contain zombie metaphors in songs like "Monster" ("He ate my heart..."), the Cossack-like music in "Teeth" ("Take a bite of my bad-girl meat..."), and "Dance in the Dark" ("Silicone, saline, poison, inject me..."). The last of those lyrics also refer to famous people who met a tragic end: Marilyn Monroe, Judy Garland, Sylvia Plath, Princess Diana, Liberace, and JonBenét Ramsey. Recording sessions were held in Los Angeles, London, Osaka, and Amsterdam. Four of the songs were primarily produced by RedOne, with additional productions on the other songs by Ron Fair, Fernando Garibay, Tal Herzberg, Rodney "Darkchild" Jerkins, Teddy Riley, and Space Cowboy. Gaga was the co-producer on all the tracks.

"Bad Romance"
A 30-second sample of "Bad Romance", which set the musical tone of The Fame Monster. It illustrates the chorus and the club beat, which forms the backbone of the track, as well as the "rah-rah" hook repeated throughout the track.

The Fame Monster begins with the track "Bad Romance", which Simon Price from The Independent felt set the tone for the album. He added that the track contained a "dominant atmosphere and a Gothic aesthetic, from the monochrome cover artwork of the single version to the crucifix logo". For Paul Lester from BBC, the refrain of "Bad Romance" has sonic similarities to songs by Boney M, and the composition is reminiscent of Depeche Mode's fifth studio album, Black Celebration (1986). A "catchy" chorus and a club-like beat is the crux of the song, talking about how love hurts in both good and bad ways. There is a sing-along hook—"Rah, rah, ah, ah, ah/Roma, roma ma/Gaga, ooh la la"—present in between the verses. The second track, "Alejandro", incorporates elements from music of ABBA and Ace of Base, with the lyrics talking about Gaga fending off a harem of Latino men. The lyrics were also interpreted as bidding farewell to a lover, accompanied by RedOne's production. "Monster" consists of stuttering synths and instrumentation from heavy drums. The intro contains a double four-square beat and Auto-Tune on Gaga's vocals as she sings the lyrics with a Don Juan womanizer metaphor.

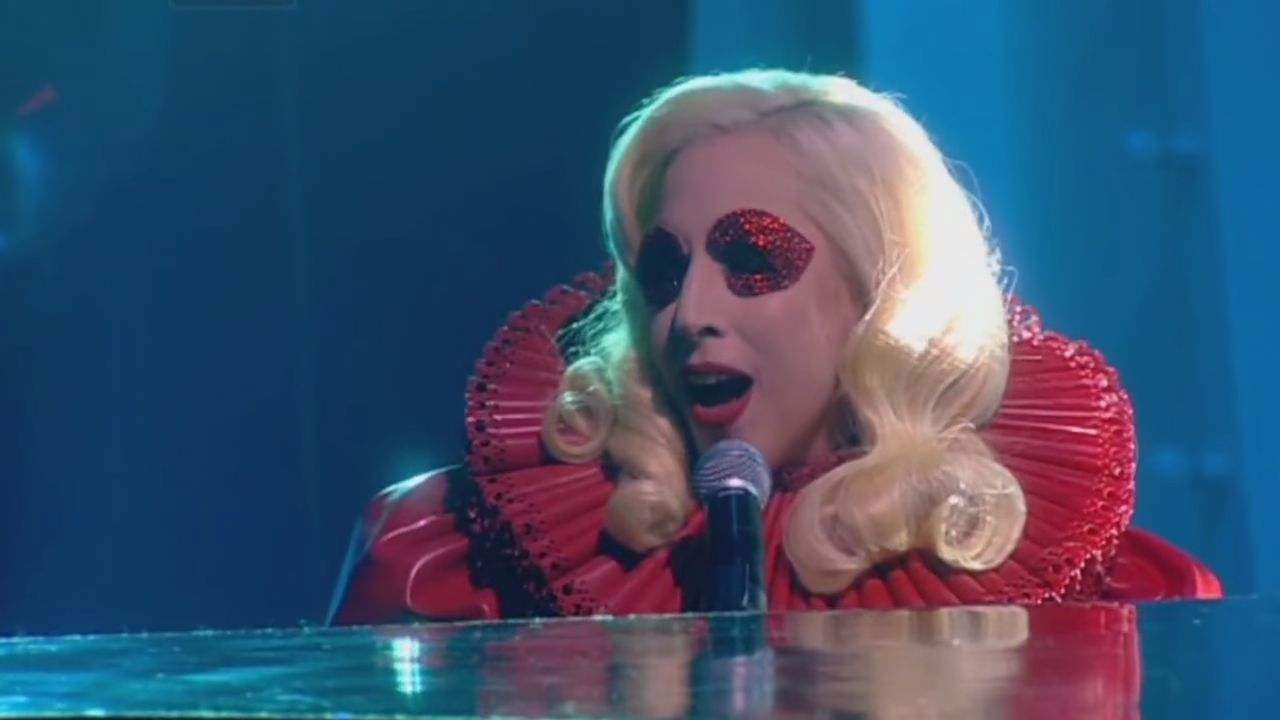
Gaga performing "Speechless" at the 2009 Royal Variety Performance. The song is a rock power ballad, which drew comparisons to the musical style of Freddie Mercury and Queen.

The fourth track is the ballad "Speechless", a 1970s rock-inspired song that discusses abusive relationships with lyrics like "I can't believe how you slurred at me with your half-wired broken jaw". It consists of vocal harmonies and guitar riffs, which, according to PopMatters, is comparable to the work of Freddie Mercury and Queen. Gaga's inspiration for the track was her father's heart condition. She recalls how her father used to call after having a few drinks, but the singer was speechless in her response, fearing that he might die. Produced by Ron Fair, "Speechless" was recorded with all live instruments such as drums, guitars, bass and piano played by Gaga. The album's fifth track, "Dance in the Dark", talks about a girl who likes to have sex with the lights off as she is ashamed of her body. Gaga has "resolute" vocals in the song, and the synths ultimately lead to the chorus where she belts, "Baby loves to Dance in the Dark, 'Cause when he's looking she falls apart".

"Telephone" was originally written by Gaga for singer Britney Spears's sixth studio album, Circus (2008), but Spears' label rejected it. Gaga later recorded it as a collaboration with Beyoncé for The Fame Monster. The song talks about the singer preferring the dance floor rather than answering her lover's call, with the verses sung in a rapid-fire style, accompanied by a double beat. Gaga explained that the song deals with her fear of suffocation, "fear [of] never being able to enjoy myself. 'Cause I love my work so much, I find it really hard to go out and have a good time." In "So Happy I Could Die", Gaga presents an ode to sexual feeling and actions, stating, "I love that lavender blonde, The way she moves the way she walks, I touch myself, can't get enough." The object of affection in the track becomes Gaga herself as she sings about drinking, dancing, observing, and touching herself, in a sedated, Auto-Tuned voice. The Fame Monster ends with the song "Teeth", which has a gospel style composition.

== Release and artwork ==
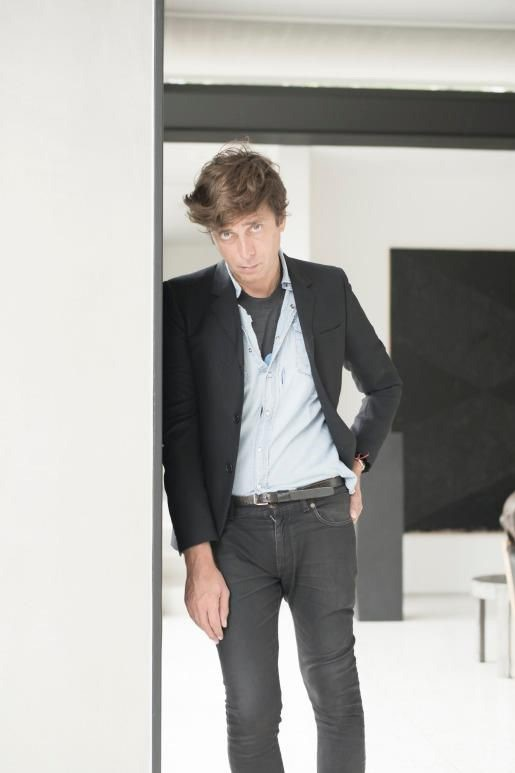
French photographer Hedi Slimane shot the album covers.

Gaga confirmed that the eight new songs would be released in North America as a standalone extended play (EP). She felt that The Fame Monster should be treated as her sophomore release and did not want to "add, nor take away any songs from this EP. It is a complete conceptual and musical body of work that can stand on its own two feet". The EP was released in North America on November 23, 2009. The deluxe-edition double album, featuring the eight new songs on the first disc and The Fame on the second, was released the same day. The limited edition, which included a lock of her wig, followed three weeks later. Interscope had planned to release only a double-disc deluxe edition of The Fame, but Gaga argued with the record label, saying that her fans who already purchased The Fame should be able to purchase only the new tracks. As a result, in countries such as the United States, The Fame Monster was also released as a separate standard EP. On May 3, 2010, The Fame Monster Limited Edition USB flash drive was released. It included the explicit version of the tracks, as well as nine remixes, eight music videos, a digital booklet, single cover artwork, and a photo gallery.

Two covers were created for The Fame Monster, both of which were shot by French photographer Hedi Slimane. The first cover artwork features Gaga sporting a blond wig and a sleek, angular black coat, the collar of which covers the lower half of her face. The angular obscuring of her face was a reference to the similar cover art for The Fame, but was relegated as "sleek" by Andrew Unterberger from Billboard. He added that "there's a danger in Gaga's eyes this time out, and the feeling of greater depth in its austerity: A star, but one with a lot to say." The second cover artwork is reminiscent of Gaga's appearance as "Stefani" before she became famous and developed her image. In this photo, Gaga is draped in thick brown hair similar in style and color to her natural hair with heavy, streaked black eyeliner running down her face to represent tears. In interviews, Gaga explained that the two album covers are part of the "yin and yang" concept depicting who she was before and after achieving fame. A vinyl picture disc edition of The Fame Monster features the "blonde" cover on the A-side and "brunette" cover on the B-side.

Gaga initially had a dispute with her record label over the artwork; Interscope found the brunette cover to be too dark and gothic for a mainstream release. However, Gaga convinced them by explaining that both would be suitable with the yin and yang concept of the album. The font used on the cover is the sans-serif letterform used by Christian Dior in their campaigns.

== Promotion ==
=== Singles ===
The album's lead single, "Bad Romance", was released for digital download on October 23, 2009. The song topped numerous record charts, as well as reaching a peak of number two in the United States, Australia, New Zealand, Belgium, and Switzerland, ultimately selling 12 million copies worldwide. The accompanying music video, featuring Gaga inside a surreal white bathhouse, garnered acclaim from critics, who praised the risqué and symbolic nature of the plot, as well as its artistic direction and vivid imagery. In 2011, the music video was voted the best video of the 2000s (decade) by readers of Billboard.

"Telephone" was released as the album's second single on January 26, 2010. The track reached number one on the UK Singles Chart, becoming Gaga's second consecutive UK number-one single and fourth overall. It peaked at number three on the Billboard Hot 100, making it her sixth consecutive single to reach the top ten. "Telephone" also reached number one on the Mainstream Top 40 chart, becoming Gaga's sixth consecutive number-one on the chart, tying with Mariah Carey for the most number-one singles since the chart's launch in 1992. The music video is a continuation of the clip for Gaga's previous single, "Paparazzi" (2010), with the plot showing Beyoncé bailing Gaga from jail and together going on a murder spree.

"Dance in the Dark" was intended by Gaga's record label to be the third single. However, Gaga chose "Alejandro" after a disagreement with her label and it was released on April 20, 2010. "Alejandro" reached the top five of the Australian and Canadian charts, as well as the top ten of the charts of other nations. In the United States, it reached number five, becoming her seventh consecutive top ten single on the Billboard Hot 100. "Dance in the Dark" was then released as the fourth and final single from The Fame Monster in France and Russia in the second half of 2010. It had minor chart placements, reaching number 24 in Australia and number 30 on the French Digital Charts.

=== Performances ===
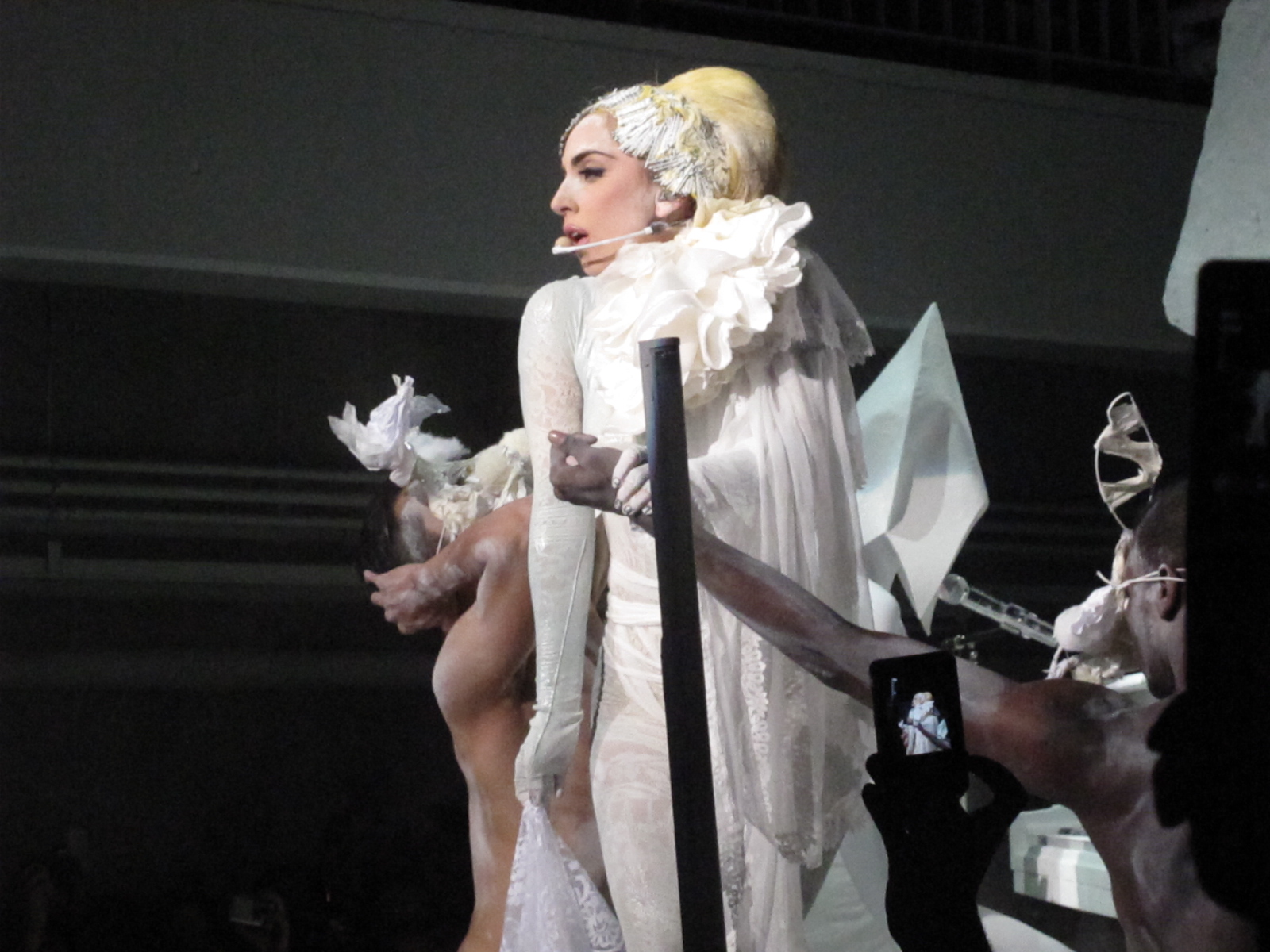
Gaga performing The Fame Monster's third single, "Alejandro", during "GagaKoh" in Tokyo, Japan

Promotion for The Fame Monster began with a performance on Saturday Night Live that included segments of a piano version of "Bad Romance". Gaga also appeared on various talk shows, including It's On with Alexa Chung and Germany's Wetten, dass..?. On November 16, 2009, Gaga performed "Speechless" at Los Angeles Museum of Contemporary Art's 30th Anniversary celebrations. She collaborated with artist Francesco Vezzolli and members of Russia's Bolshoi Ballet Academy. The same day she performed "Bad Romance" on CW's Gossip Girl, during an episode titled "The Last Days of Disco Stick". Gaga also performed "Bad Romance" at the 2009 American Music Awards, The Jay Leno Show, The Ellen DeGeneres Show and The X Factor UK. She then performed "Speechless" at the Royal Variety Performance.

Gaga appeared on The Oprah Winfrey Show in January 2010, and performed a medley of "Monster", "Bad Romance", and "Speechless". At the 52nd Grammy Awards, the singer opened the show by performing a medley of "Poker Face", "Speechless", and "Your Song" with Elton John. At the 2010 Brit Awards, Gaga sang a ballad version of "Telephone" and then "Dance in the Dark", in memory of designer Alexander McQueen. In March 2010, "Bad Romance" and "Monster" were added as downloadable content for the Rock Band video game series, along with "Just Dance" and "Poker Face" from The Fame. Gaga appeared on Friday Night with Jonathan Ross, and sang "Brown Eyes" (from The Fame) and "Telephone". The next month, she held a mini-concert in Japan for MAC Cosmetics, collaborating with Canadian performance artist, Terence Koh. Billed as "GagaKoh", the concert took place on a rotating stage where Koh had created a statue of a naked woman with rabbit ears. The singer performed "Speechless", "Alejandro", and "Bad Romance" at the event.

=== Tour ===
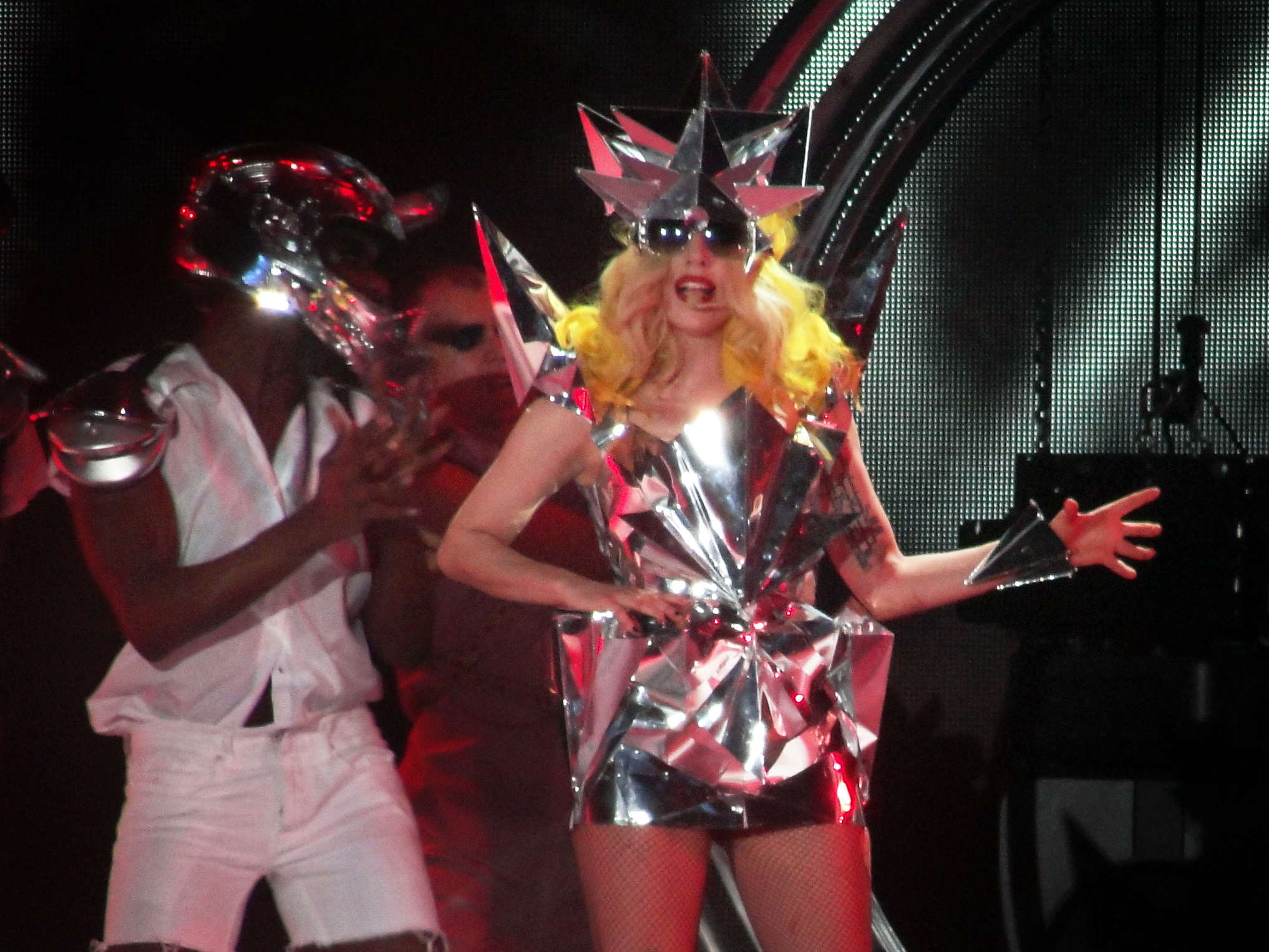
Gaga performing lead single "Bad Romance" at The Monster Ball Tour. The concert series became the highest-grossing tour by a debut headlining artist.

Gaga had initially planned to accompany rapper Kanye West on the concert tour Fame Kills: Starring Kanye West and Lady Gaga. After his controversy at the 2009 MTV Video Music Awards with Taylor Swift, West announced that he was taking a break from music. All the Fame Kills tour dates were immediately cancelled and Gaga confirmed that she was going on tour alone to promote The Fame Monster. Described by Gaga as "the first-ever pop electro opera", The Monster Ball Tour ran from November 2009 to May 2011. Gaga and her production team initially developed a stage that looked like a frame, with the show fitted within it. The singer felt that the design would allow her creative control. Since the album dealt with the paranoias faced by Gaga over the previous year, the main theme of the show became evolution, with Gaga portraying growth as the show progressed. The set list consisted of songs from both The Fame and The Fame Monster.

For the 2010 shows, Gaga felt that a revamp was needed as the original tour was constructed in a very short span of time. The new theme narrated a story where Gaga and her friends, traveling through New York, get lost while going to the Monster Ball. The show was divided into five segments with an encore as the final segment. Each segment featured Gaga in a new dress and was followed by a video interlude to the next one. The tour grossed an estimated US$227.4 million from 200 reported shows attended by an audience of 2.5 million, making it the highest-grossing tour by a debut headlining artist. A tour special was filmed by HBO during Gaga's February 2011 shows at Madison Square Garden in New York City.

== Critical reception ==
Professional ratings
Aggregate scores
Source	Rating
AnyDecentMusic?	6.6/10
Metacritic	78/100
Review scores
Source	Rating
AllMusic	5/5 stars
The Daily Telegraph	3/5 stars
Los Angeles Times	3/4 stars
MSN Music (Consumer Guide)	A−
NME	8/10
The Observer	4/5 stars
Pitchfork	7.8/10
Rolling Stone	3.5/5 stars
Slant Magazine	3.5/5 stars
Spin	6/10

The Fame Monster received generally positive reviews from music critics. At Metacritic, which assigns a normalized rating out of 100 to reviews from mainstream critics, it received a weighted average score of 78, based on 14 reviews. Sal Cinquemani from Slant Magazine felt that the album was not a huge leap forward for Gaga, but provided "small, if fleeting, glimpses behind the pretense." Simon Price of The Independent called it "a whole new piece of art in its own right." Kitty Empire from The Observer said that the album is "a lot more splendidly deranged" than the work of the Pussycat Dolls. MSN Music's Robert Christgau found it to be of "comparable quality" as The Fame and gave it a rating of A−, describing the tracks as "streamlined pop machines". Christgau further elaborated that "after being overwhelmed by the sheer visibility of her warp-speed relaunch did I realize how enjoyable and inescapable her hooks and snatches had turned out to be."

NME's Ben Patashnik described The Fame Monster as "as pristine as you'd expect, but has a sub-zero core of isolation and fear". Patashnik went on to call the album's release "the moment Gaga cements herself as a real star". Evan Sawdey from PopMatters commended Gaga for being "willing to try new things" and felt that the album shows "she's not complacent with doing the same thing over again [...] Gaga is allowed to make a few mistakes on her way toward pop nirvana—and judging what she's aiming for with The Fame Monster, there's a good chance she's going to get there sooner than later." Mikael Wood from Los Angeles Times felt that The Fame Monster continued to demonstrate Gaga's creative ambition and stylistic range.

Jon Dolan from Rolling Stone called the EP "largely on point," and gave it 3.5 stars out of 5. He also said that "half the disc is Madonna knock-offs, but that's part of the concept—fame monsters needn't concern themselves with originality." Edna Gundersen from USA Today observed that on The Fame Monster, "Gaga's icy aloofness and seeming aversion to a genuine human connection leave a disturbing void. With an avant-garde intellect, pop-electro eccentricities and freaky theatrics competing for attention, there's no room for heart."

Ed Power reviewed the album for Ireland's Hot Press magazine in which he complimented Gaga, saying she "always brings her A-game" in her music. Neil McCormick from The Daily Telegraph commented that the album has "an irrepressible quality that is given full rein. [...] Although not as thematically integrated as the original [The Fame], Gaga's vivacious energy, bold melodies and almost comically relentless sensationalism keeps things interesting." Josh Modell of Spin praised the fast-paced songs on the record, but felt that "When Gaga reaches for sincere balladry [...] she sounds lost". Writing for The Times, Sarah Hajibagheri criticized the album for lacking "the beat and bite that made us all go Gaga for the eccentric New Yorker".

== Commercial performance ==
In the United States, the individual disc of The Fame Monster charted at number five on the Billboard 200 with sales of 174,000 copies while the double-disc deluxe edition, including the original The Fame, moved up from number 34 to number 6 with sales of 151,000 copies. The album also topped the Digital Albums chart with sales of 65,000. Seven of the eight songs from the record also charted on the Hot Digital Songs chart, led by "Bad Romance" which held the top position for the second week with sales of 218,000 copies. In total, Gaga had 11 songs that week charting on the Digital Songs. The Fame Monster topped the Dance/Electronic Albums chart, replacing The Fame and becoming Gaga's second number one album on the chart.

In March 2020, the album was certified quintuple Platinum by the Recording Industry Association of America (RIAA) for shipments of five million copies. As of February 2018, The Fame Monster has sold 1.65 million copies in the United States, according to Nielsen Soundscan. For the 2010 Billboard year-end tabulation, The Fame Monster was ranked at number 13 on the Billboard 200 and number two on the Dance/Electronic Albums chart. In Canada, the album debuted and peaked at number six on the Billboard Canadian Albums Chart. It was the 23rd best-selling album in the country for 2010.

In Australia, The Fame Monster initially charted with The Fame, but was later considered a standalone entry. It debuted at number six on the ARIA Albums Chart and in its 18th week, the record climbed to number one. It received a quadruple platinum certification by the Australian Recording Industry Association (ARIA) for shipments of 280,000 copies of the album. In Japan, after spending more than 20 weeks on the Oricon Albums Chart, the album reached its peak position of number two in May 2010. By July 2011, the album had sold 548,000 copies in Japan and ranked at number 14 on the year-end list for 2010.

In the United Kingdom, The Fame Monster was only available as a deluxe edition, not as a standalone album, so it charted as part of The Fame. After The Fame Monster's release, The Fame moved from number 55 to number 7 on the UK Albums Chart. All the new tracks from The Fame Monster charted within the top 200 of the UK Singles Chart. In the week ending March 6, 2010, The Fame reached the top of the chart. Because of its chart activity across European markets, The Fame Monster peaked at number 13 on the European Top 100 Albums chart. It was certified triple platinum by the International Federation of the Phonographic Industry (IFPI) for shipment of three million copies across the continent.

== Recognition ==
In 2010, Gaga won the "Outstanding Music Artist" award for The Fame Monster, at the 21st GLAAD Media Awards. The album and its songs were nominated for six categories at the 53rd Annual Grammy Awards. The Fame Monster was nominated for Album of the Year and won Best Pop Vocal Album. "Bad Romance" won for Best Female Pop Vocal Performance and Best Short Form Music Video, while "Telephone" and "Dance in the Dark" were nominated for Best Pop Collaboration with Vocals and Best Dance Recording, respectively.

The album earned Best Album nominations at the 2010 International Dance Music Award and the Meteor Awards. It won Best English Album at the Premios Oye! 2010 awards in Mexico. At the 2011 Billboard Music Awards, it was nominated for Top Electronic/Dance Album.

Time magazine listed The Fame Monster in their "Top 10 Albums of 2009" list, noting that it demonstrates "a complete understanding of what dance audiences require and vocal talent that's easy to forget underneath all that platinum hair." Spin ranked the album at number 197 on their list of "The 300 Best Albums of the Past 30 Years" and characterized it as Gaga's magnum opus and a "mini-masterpiece".

In 2012, Complex ranked it sixth on its list of the "50 Best Pop Album Covers of the Past Five Years". Dale Eisenger from the publication called both covers "alluring and gorgeous", adding that Gaga's look was followed by a number of artists emulating it in later years. In 2015, Billboard included the standard album cover on their list of the "50 Greatest Album Covers of All Time". Andrew Unterberger from the publication wrote in a 2016 article that the cover artwork was "much starker and more angular than the party-diva framing of [The Fame]. It's still very sleek, but there's a danger in Gaga's eyes this time out, and the feeling of greater depth in its austerity: A star, but one with a lot to say." In November 2016, Billboard named The Fame Monster Gaga's best album. In 2024, Apple Music placed it at number 89 on its inaugural list of the "100 Best Albums".

== Legacy ==
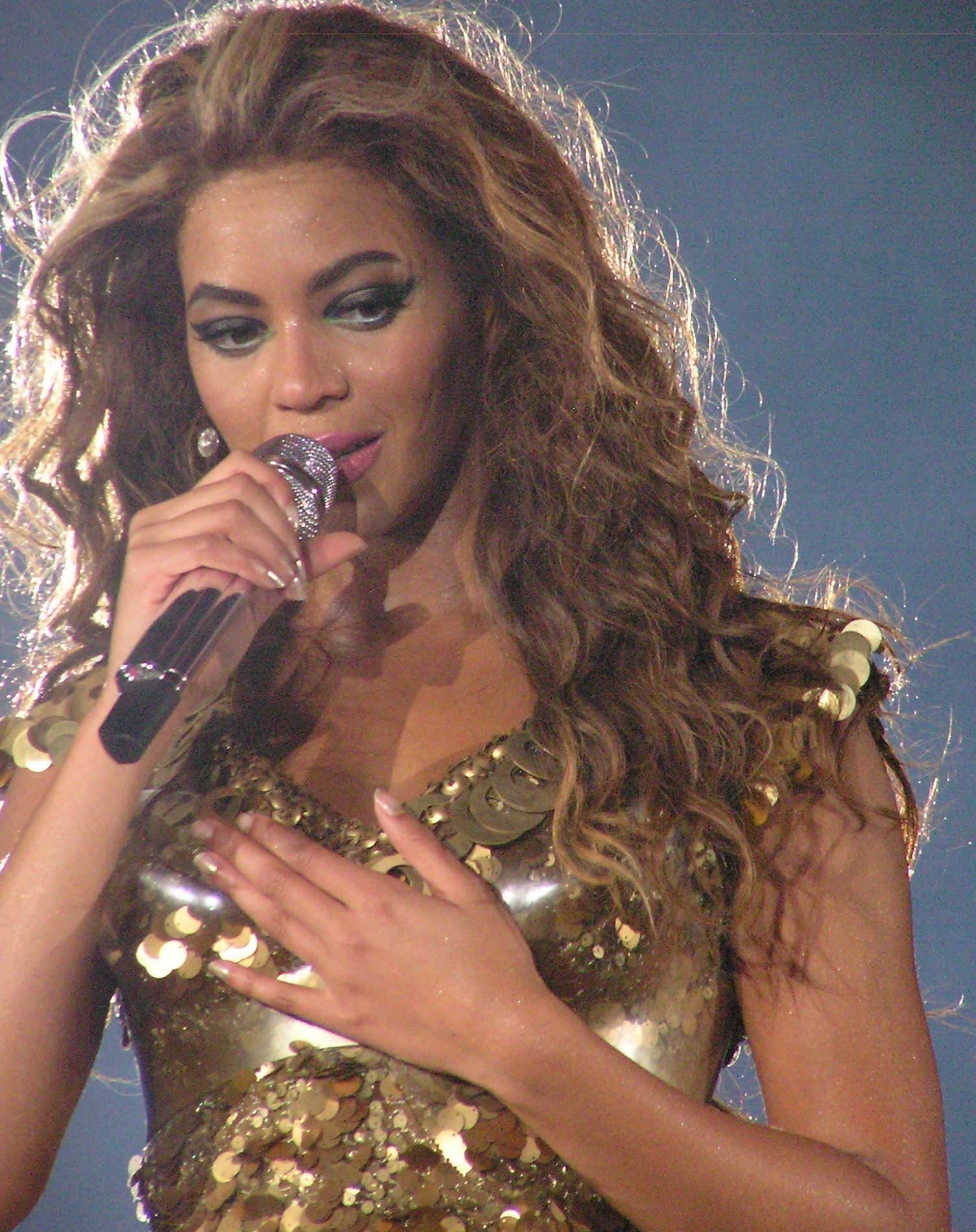
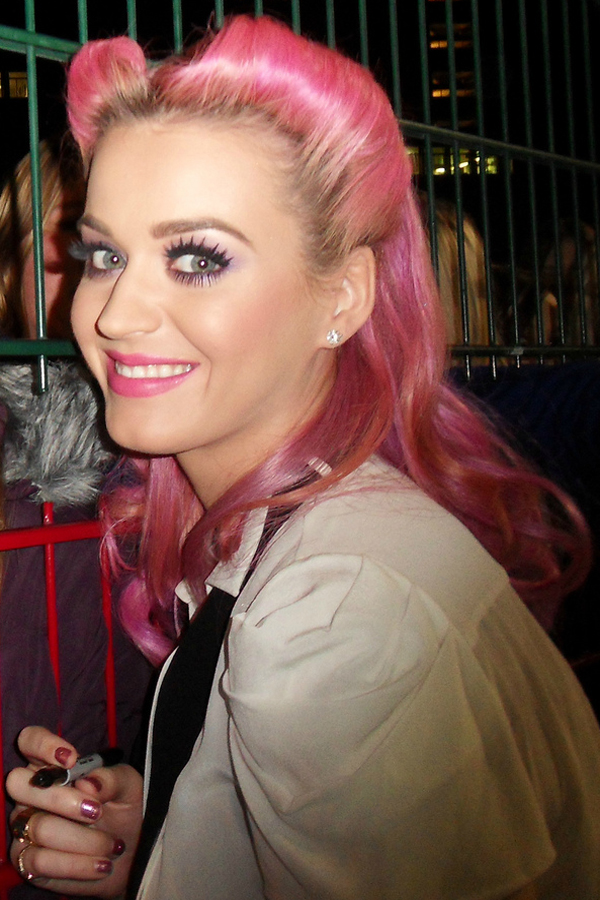
The impact of The Fame Monster was observed in the subsequent projects of artists such as Beyoncé (left) and Katy Perry (right).

According to Billboard, as of 2022, The Fame Monster is one of the 15 best-performing 21st-century albums without any of its singles reaching number one on the Billboard Hot 100. With the release of The Fame and The Fame Monster, Gaga was credited with helping revive electronic dance music in late-2000s popular music by professional critics, DJs Tommie Sunshine and Calvin Harris, and radio personality Zane Lowe. Additionally, Andrew Unterberger of Billboard stated that "Gaga raised the standards for ambition in pop", concluding that she "took American mainstream music at one of its least-interesting and most star-power-deprived moments and made it bigger, weirder, more visual and infinitely more personality-driven – in other words, much more fun."

Critics acknowledged that The Fame Monster also influenced the images of pop stars, helping popularize bizarre and outrageous outfits. Tracie Egan Morrissey from Jezebel, said that 2011 MTV Video Music Awards's red carpet "reeks of Lady Gaga's influence", particularly noting the effect on the attire of Nicki Minaj and Katy Perry at the show. Jon Caramanica from The New York Times in his article "Girl Pop's Lady Gaga Makeover" states: "It's Halloween-costume empowerment, sure, but her fingerprints are all over the revised images of Christina Aguilera, Rihanna, Katy Perry and Beyoncé; and on new artists like Kesha, Janelle Monáe and Nicki Minaj" and that "the work she's done since her 2008 debut album [...] has nudged loose conventional boundaries."

In 2019, Pitchfork ranked the album number 151 on its "Best Albums of the 2010s" list, noting that although it was officially released in November 2009, they made an exception as the album "cast such a long shadow over this decade". The Fame Monster ranked number 45 on Consequence's "The 100 Greatest Albums of All Time" and sixth on its "Top 75 Albums of the Last 15 Years". The publication commented on its continued relevance, stating that the album "laid a certain groundwork for many women in pop to follow."

== Track listing ==
The Fame Monster track listing
No.	Title	Writer(s)	Producer(s)	Length
1.	"Bad Romance"	RedOne; Lady Gaga	RedOne; Gaga^{[a]}	4:54
2.	"Alejandro"	RedOne; Gaga	RedOne; Gaga^{[a]}	4:34
3.	"Monster"	RedOne; Gaga; Space Cowboy	RedOne; Gaga^{[a]}	4:10
4.	"Speechless"	Gaga	Ron Fair; Gaga^{[a]}; Tal Herzberg^{[a]}	4:31
5.	"Dance in the Dark"	Gaga; Fernando Garibay	Garibay; Gaga^{[a]}	4:49
6.	"Telephone" (featuring Beyoncé)	Gaga; Rodney Jerkins; LaShawn Daniels; Lazonate Franklin; Beyoncé	Jerkins; Gaga^{[a]}; Mike "Handz" Donaldson^{[b]}	3:41
7.	"So Happy I Could Die"	Gaga; RedOne; Space Cowboy	RedOne; Gaga; Space Cowboy	3:55
8.	"Teeth"	Gaga; Taja Riley; Pete Wyoming Bender^{[c]}; Teddy Riley^{[c]}	Teddy Riley; Gaga^{[a]}	3:41
Total length:				34:15

=== Notes ===
- ^{^[a]} signifies a co-producer
- ^{^[b]} signifies an additional vocal producer
- ^{^[c]} While Bender and Teddy Riley are not credited as songwriters of "Teeth" in the album liner notes, they are listed as songwriters by Broadcast Music, Inc. (BMI).
- Deluxe edition disc two mirrors the track listing of The Fame.
- iTunes Store edition includes the Starsmith Remix of "Bad Romance" as track 9.
- USB edition includes eight remixes of "Bad Romance", "Telephone", "Paparazzi", "Just Dance", "LoveGame" and "Eh, Eh (Nothing Else I Can Say)", plus a live piano version of "Poker Face" recorded at The Cherrytree House.
- Japanese edition includes a DVD which features the music video and behind the scenes of "Bad Romance".

== Personnel ==
Credits adapted from the liner notes of The Fame Monster.

=== Musicians ===
- Lady Gaga – vocals (all tracks); vocal arrangement, background vocals (tracks 1–3, 7); piano (track 4); additional instrumentation, arrangement (track 5); all instruments, programming (track 7)
- RedOne – all instruments, programming, vocal arrangement, background vocals (tracks 1–3, 7)
- Space Cowboy – background vocals (track 3); all instruments, programming (track 7)
- Ron Fair – arrangement, conducting (track 4)
- Abraham Laboriel Jr. – drums (track 4)
- Tal Herzberg – bass (track 4)
- John Goux – all guitars (track 4)
- Fernando Garibay – instrumentation, programming, arrangement (track 5)
- Beyoncé – vocals (track 6)
- Rodney "Darkchild" Jerkins – all music (track 6)
- The Regiment Horns – horn (track 8)
- Eric Jackson – guitars (track 8)
- Teyonie – background vocals (track 8)
- Stacy Dulan – background vocals (track 8)

=== Technical ===
- RedOne – production, vocal editing, recording, engineering (tracks 1–3, 7)
- Lady Gaga – co-production (tracks 1–6, 8); production (track 7)
- Johnny Severin – vocal editing (tracks 1–3, 7); engineering (tracks 3, 7)
- Dave Russell – engineering (tracks 1, 3, 7); tracking engineering, mixing (track 8)
- Eelco Bakker – engineering (tracks 1, 2)
- Mark "Spike" Stent – mixing (tracks 1, 6)
- Matty Green – mixing assistance (tracks 1, 6)
- Robert Orton – mixing (tracks 2, 3, 5, 7)
- Space Cowboy – recording (track 3); production (track 7)
- Ron Fair – production (track 4)
- Tal Herzberg – co-production, recording engineering (track 4)
- Jack Joseph Puig – mixing {track 4)
- Frank Wolff – recording engineering (track 4)
- Ryan Kennedy – engineering assistance (track 4)
- Tal Oz – engineering assistance (track 4)
- Joe Cory – engineering assistance (track 4)
- Fernando Garibay – production (track 5)
- Jonas Wetling – recording engineering, tracking engineering (track 5)
- Dan Parry – recording engineering, tracking engineering (track 5)
- Christian Delano – recording engineering, tracking engineering (track 5)
- Rodney "Darkchild" Jerkins – production, mixing (track 6)
- Paul Foley – recording (track 6)
- Mike "Handz" Donaldson – recording (Lady Gaga's vocals), additional vocal production, special effects (track 6)
- Hisashi Mizoguchi – recording (Beyoncé's vocals) (track 6)
- Takayuki Matsushima – recording assistance (Beyoncé's vocals) (track 6)
- Teddy Riley – production, mixing (track 8)
- Mike Daly – mixing assistance (track 8)
- Vincent Herbert – executive production
- Lisa Einhorn Gilder – production coordination
- Andrea Ruffalo – production coordination
- Gretchen Anderson – production

=== Artwork ===
- Julian Peploe Studio – art direction
- Hedi Slimane – photography

== Charts ==
=== Weekly charts ===
Weekly chart performance
Chart (2009–2010)	Peak position
Australian Albums (ARIA)	1
Belgian Albums (Ultratop Flanders)	1
Belgian Albums (Ultratop Wallonia)	5
Brazilian Albums (ABPD)	3
Canadian Albums (Billboard)	6
Croatian International Albums (HDU)	1
Czech Albums (ČNS IFPI)	3
Danish Albums (Hitlisten)	2
Dutch Albums (Album Top 100)	4
European Top 100 Albums (Billboard)	13
Finnish Albums (Suomen virallinen lista)	1
French Albums (SNEP)	13
Greek Albums (IFPI)	37
Hungarian Albums (MAHASZ)	2
Italian Albums (FIMI)	2
Japanese Albums (Oricon)	2
New Zealand Albums (RMNZ)	1
Norwegian Albums (VG-lista)	8
Polish Albums (ZPAV)	1
Russian Albums (2M)	3
Slovenian Albums (IFPI)	13
South Korean Albums (Circle)	21
South Korean International Albums (Circle)	5
Spanish Albums (Promusicae)	26
Swedish Albums (Sverigetopplistan)	2
Taiwan International Albums (G-Music)	1
US Billboard 200	5
US Top Dance Albums (Billboard)	1
US Indie Store Album Sales (Billboard)	4

Weekly chart performance
Chart (2025)	Peak position
Portuguese Albums (AFP)	79

=== Monthly charts ===
Monthly chart performance
Chart (2010–2011)	Peak position
Argentinian Albums (CAPIF)	8
Uruguayan International Albums (CUD)	5

=== Year-end charts ===
Year-end chart performance
Chart (2009)	Position
Australian Albums (ARIA)	59
Australian Dance Albums (ARIA)	9
Danish Albums (Hitlisten)	28
Finnish Albums (Suomen virallinen lista)	15
German Albums (Offizielle Top 100)	4
Irish Albums (IRMA)	3
Italian Albums (FIMI)	28
Swedish Albums (Sverigetopplistan)	90

Year-end chart performance
Chart (2010)	Position
Australian Albums (ARIA)	6
Australian Dance Albums (ARIA)	1
Belgian Albums (Ultratop Flanders)	6
Belgian Albums (Ultratop Wallonia)	13
Canadian Albums (Billboard)	23
Croatian International Albums (HDU)	1
Danish Albums (Hitlisten)	10
Dutch Albums (Album Top 100)	10
European Top 100 Albums (Billboard)	16
Finnish Albums (Suomen virallinen lista)	4
French Albums (SNEP)	6
German Albums (Offizielle Top 100)	3
Hungarian Albums (MAHASZ)	3
Italian Albums (FIMI)	8
Japanese Albums (Oricon)	14
New Zealand Albums (RMNZ)	7
Russian Albums (2M)	4
South Korean International Albums (Circle)	13
Swedish Albums (Sverigetopplistan)	3
US Billboard 200	13
US Top Dance/Electronic Albums (Billboard)	2
Worldwide (IFPI)	2

Year-end chart performance
Chart (2011)	Position
Australian Albums (ARIA)	99
Australian Dance Albums (ARIA)	15
Japanese Albums (Oricon)	44
New Zealand Albums (RMNZ)	36
Swedish Albums (Sverigetopplistan)	93
US Top Dance/Electronic Albums (Billboard)	8

Year-end chart performance
Chart (2012)	Position
Australian Dance Albums (ARIA)	45

Year-end chart performance
Chart (2017)	Position
Australian Dance Albums (ARIA)	35

Year-end chart performance
Chart (2018)	Position
Australian Dance Albums (ARIA)	14

Year-end chart performance
Chart (2019)	Position
Croatian International Albums (HDU)	36

Year-end chart performance
Chart (2021)	Position
Swedish Albums (Sverigetopplistan)	62

Year-end chart performance
Chart (2022)	Position
Swedish Albums (Sverigetopplistan)	47

Year-end chart performance
Chart (2023)	Position
New Zealand Albums (RMNZ)	47
Swedish Albums (Sverigetopplistan)	29

Year-end chart performance
Chart (2024)	Position
Australian Dance Albums (ARIA)	49
Swedish Albums (Sverigetopplistan)	20

Year-end chart performance
Chart (2025)	Position
Australian Dance Albums (ARIA)	29
Swedish Albums (Sverigetopplistan)	14

=== Decade-end charts ===
Decade-end chart performance
Chart (2010–2019)	Position
Australian Albums (ARIA)	35
US Billboard 200	152
US Top Dance/Electronic Albums (Billboard)	16

== Certifications and sales ==
Certifications and sales
Region	Certification	Certified units/sales
Australia (ARIA)	4× Platinum	280,000^{‡}
Belgium (BRMA)	2× Platinum	60,000^{*}
Brazil (Pro-Música Brasil)	2× Platinum	120,000^{*}
Canada (Music Canada)	Diamond	800,000^{^}
Czech Republic	—	15,000
Denmark (IFPI Danmark)	5× Platinum	100,000^{‡}
Finland (Musiikkituottajat)	Platinum	32,922
France (SNEP)	2× Platinum	300,000
GCC (IFPI Middle East)	Gold	3,000^{*}
Greece (IFPI Greece)	Platinum	6,000^{^}
Japan (RIAJ)	2× Platinum	548,000
Netherlands (NVPI)	2× Platinum	120,000^{^}
New Zealand (RMNZ) Combined with The Fame	11× Platinum	165,000^{‡}
Norway (IFPI Norway)	3× Platinum	60,000^{‡}
Poland (ZPAV)	Diamond	100,000^{*}
Russia (NFPF)	4× Platinum	80,000^{*}
Singapore (RIAS)	Platinum	10,000^{*}
Spain (Promusicae)	Platinum	60,000^{^}
Sweden (GLF)	Platinum	40,000^{‡}
Taiwan	—	28,000 (Note: 2009 year-end sales, according to Taiwan Institute of Economic Research.)
United States (RIAA)	5× Platinum	5,000,000^{‡}
Summaries
Europe (IFPI)	3× Platinum	3,000,000^{*}
^{*} Sales figures based on certification alone.^{^} Shipments figures based on certification alone.^{‡} Sales+streaming figures based on certification alone.

== Release history ==
Release dates and formats
Region	Date	Edition(s)	Format(s)	Label(s)	Ref.
Italy	November 17, 2009	Deluxe	Double CD; digital download	Universal Music	
Japan	November 18, 2009	Deluxe	Double CD; digital download	Universal Music	
Germany	November 20, 2009	Deluxe	Double CD; digital download	Universal Music	
Poland	November 20, 2009	Deluxe	Double CD; digital download	Universal Music	
Australia	November 23, 2009	Deluxe	Double CD; digital download	Universal Music	
Denmark	November 23, 2009	Deluxe	Double CD; digital download	Universal Music	
France	November 23, 2009	Deluxe	Double CD; digital download	Polydor	
United Kingdom	November 23, 2009	Deluxe	Double CD; digital download	Polydor	
United States	November 23, 2009	Standard; deluxe	CD; double CD; digital download	Interscope; Streamline; Kon Live; Cherrytree	
France	December 1, 2009	Standard	CD	Polydor	
Colombia	December 4, 2009	Deluxe	Double CD; digital download	Universal Music	
United States	December 15, 2009	Standard	Vinyl	Interscope; Streamline; Kon Live; Cherrytree	
United States	December 15, 2009	Super deluxe	Box set	Interscope; Streamline; Kon Live; Cherrytree	
Australia	December 18, 2009	Standard	Digital download	Universal Music	
Japan	April 14, 2010	Standard	CD+DVD	Universal Music	
Various	May 3, 2010	Limited	USB flash drive	Interscope; Streamline; Kon Live; Cherrytree	
Japan	June 23, 2010	Limited	USB flash drive	Universal Music	
Denmark	October 21, 2010	Standard	CD	Universal Music	
Germany	October 22, 2010	Standard	CD	Universal Music	
Italy	October 26, 2010	Standard	CD	Universal Music	

== See also ==
- List of number-one albums of 2010 (Australia)
- List of number-one albums from the 2010s (UK)
- List of number-one albums of 2010 (Ireland)
- List of number-one albums in 2010 (New Zealand)
- List of number-one albums of 2010 (Finland)
- List of number-one albums of 2010 (Poland)
- List of number-one electronic albums (United States)
- List of number-one hits of 2010 (Germany)
- List of number-one hits of 2010 (Switzerland)
