= Shadow of a Man (song) =

2025 song by Lady Gaga

Song by Lady Gaga

from the album Mayhem
- Studio: Shangri-La (Malibu, CA)
- Genre: Disco-funk
- Length: 3:19
- Label: Streamline; Interscope
- Songwriters: Lady Gaga; Andrew Watt; Henry Walter
- Producers: Lady Gaga; Andrew Watt; Cirkut

Official audio
- "Shadow of a Man" on YouTube

"Shadow of a Man" is a 2025 song by Lady Gaga that was recorded for her eighth studio album, Mayhem (2025). It was first teased in the concert special Gaga Chromatica Ball (2024). Written and produced by Gaga, Andrew Watt, and Cirkut, it is a disco-funk song featuring electropop synths, with lyrics that convey a message of women's empowerment. Gaga described it as the track that most reflects where she was in her life at the time, saying the song embodied her experience of "learning how to dance in the shadow" of the men she often found herself surrounded by in her career.

Music journalists gave "Shadow of a Man" a generally positive reception, often picking it as one of the album's highlights. Michael Jackson's influence on the production and Gaga's singing style was also a common observation. Commercially, it entered several national and component charts following the release of Mayhem, including the Billboard Global 200 and the Canadian Hot 100. Between 2025 and 2026, Gaga performed the song live during various promotional concerts and the Mayhem Ball tour, with the choreography and her appearance also prompting journalist comparisons to Jackson. She also performed a reimagined rendition for Mayhem Requiem.

== Release and lyrical content ==
"Shadow of a Man" was written and produced by Lady Gaga alongside Andrew Watt and Cirkut. A short clip of the song was first teased at the end of Gaga Chromatica Ball (2024), a concert film of Gaga's 2022 stadium tour in support of the album Chromatica (2020). The full track was later released in 2025 as the eleventh song on the standard edition of her studio album Mayhem.

Talking about the song shortly after the album's release, Gaga said: "In my career, I was often the only woman in the room, and this record was a chance to proclaim that I've learned how to dance in the shadow of those men". She also stated it is the track from Mayhem that probably best represents where she was in her life at that time. JT Early of Beats per Minute interpreted the song's lyrics as a message of empowerment, particularly for pop artists facing constant scrutiny and questions about their relevance. Stephen Daw of Billboard highlighted the way in "Shadow of a Man", Gaga critiques the unequal pressures on female artists, who are expected to work harder for less recognition than are men. As the song builds to an intense, high-energy chorus, she fiercely pushes back, refusing to keep accepting blame for things that were not her fault ("I don't wanna be the one to fall on the knife"). Jason Collins of Black Girl Nerds found "Shadow of a Man" Gaga's most introspective song to date, writing it references the way Gaga has dealt with feelings of being overshadowed by male artists during her career, and addresses the complexities of identity and personal growth. In a round-table discussion by Atwood Magazine, Kevin Cost interpreted the song's main message as: "I am me, and not a single person can darken my light".

== Composition ==
"Shadow of a Man"
A sample of the song's pre-chorus and chorus, showcasing Gaga's dynamic vocals and the disco-infused electropop style critics compared to Michael Jackson's work.

"Shadow of a Man" is a disco-funk song featuring electropop synths and "gurning" guitars. Sputnikmusic's Dakota West Foss said both "Shadow of a Man" and "LoveDrug" create a sonic thread by blending a slightly dark ABBA-inspired vibe with "Ratatat-esque guitar licks". According to Arielle Gordon of Stereogum, the track "recalls the locomotive house of French Touch", a sound Gaga had already explored with Chromatica. The Evening Standard author India Block stated Gaga was "re-visiting some of her biggest hooks" on Mayhem, including "Shadow of a Man", which she thought "samples from her Beyoncé collab hit 'Telephone'".

"Shadow of a Man" was heavily compared to the singing style and catalogue of Michael Jackson; Pitchfork's Jaeden Pinder and Rolling Stone's Richard Burn described the track as "Michael Jackson-tinged" and "Michael Jackson-infused", respectively. Mary Siroky of Consequence and Gary Grimes of Attitude remarked that the influence was so pronounced it seemed as if Jackson's "spirit" was summoned for the production. Paste's Sam Rosenberg added that the song is "pure Michael Jackson, so much so that you half-expect to hear a 'Shamona!' or 'Hee-hee!' in the background". Comparisons were made to Jackson's "classic" eras, in particular Thriller (1982) and Bad (1987).

== Critical reception ==
Mary Siroky of Consequence described "Shadow of a Man" as "emotionally resonant" and noted it represents the undeniable peak of the album's energy. AllMusic's Neil Z. Yeung found it an "effortless pop anthem". Variety's Steven J. Horowitz remarked the track "struts with the type of cool of wearing sunglasses at night". Gary Grimes of Attitude chose "Shadow of a Man" as a standout moment on Mayhem that amplifies the album's momentum and pairs well with the lead single "Disease". He opined the closing electric-guitar riff adds a memorable punch, leaving listeners wanting more of that sound. JT Early of Beats per Minute found "Shadow of a Man" to be an "addictive", "defiant and triumphant" track that would have made an excellent album closer and a strong potential single. David Cobbald of The Line of Best Fit wrote that tracks such as "Zombieboy" and "Shadow of a Man" are "top scoring on the record". Writing for Salon, Coleman Spilde deemed the track "sensational", noting its hook outshines anything male pop artists have put out since American singer Justin Timberlake's FutureSex/LoveSounds (2006).

Screen Rant's Chris Hedden wrote that "Shadow of a Man" is "an empowering bop that reminds the listener that with the talent she has, Lady Gaga won't be put into anybody's shadow. Whether they be men or otherwise." Billboard's Stephen Daw ranked it as the fifth-best track on Mayhem, highlighting its message of female empowerment and the "bulldozing chorus". Elle included "Shadow of Man" in its list of the best new songs the reviewers heard in March 2025, saying: "With rapid-fire lyrics and an infectious energy, it's one of the high points of her latest album". Dazed writer Alim Kheraj singled out "Shadow of a Man" from Mayhem for avoiding the pitfalls of melodrama or cliché, arguing that the track presents Gaga in a more fully realised form, echoing the persona she embodied in the "Marry the Night" music video.

Vulture's Kristen S. Hé felt the song is "infectious, but it arguably suffers the most for being cut from the same cloth as Mayhem's other disco-funk tracks". Peter Piatkowski of PopMatters described "Shadow of a Man" as "perfectly serviceable MTV-pop" that "sounds like warmed-over 1980s dance-pop karaoke". The Independent's Adam White opined "Michael Jackson would be proud" of the track, and considered it a solid, if not top-tier, effort from Gaga. Ludovic Hunter-Tilney of the Financial Times was more critical, noting that although "Shadow of a Man" is impressive in how closely it echoes Michael Jackson, he felt it lacked further artistic purpose.

== Commercial performance ==
During the release week of Mayhem, "Shadow of a Man" entered the Billboard Global 200 at number 85. It was one of twelve tracks from the album to appear on the chart, ranking as the ninth highest-charting track among them. In the United States, the song reached number two on the Bubbling Under Hot 100 chart and number eleven on the Hot Dance/Pop Songs chart. On the latter chart, Gaga simultaneously placed nine songs from the album, with "Shadow of a Man" ranking as the eighth highest-positioned track. In Canada, the track debuted at number 91 on the Canadian Hot 100. Across Latin America, the track topped the Peru Anglo chart and reached number two on the Venezuela Anglo Airplay ranking. Although it did not chart in Brazil, Pro-Música Brasil awarded the song a double-platinum certification.

"Shadow of a Man" entered the UK charts for best-selling singles, most-downloaded singles, and most-streamed singles at lower positions. Elsewhere in Europe, it peaked at number 43 in Greece, number 120 in Portugal, and number 164 in France. It also appeared on several airplay charts, reaching number 55 in Russia, number 59 in Romania, number 84 in the Commonwealth of Independent States, and number 136 in Belarus.

== Live performances ==
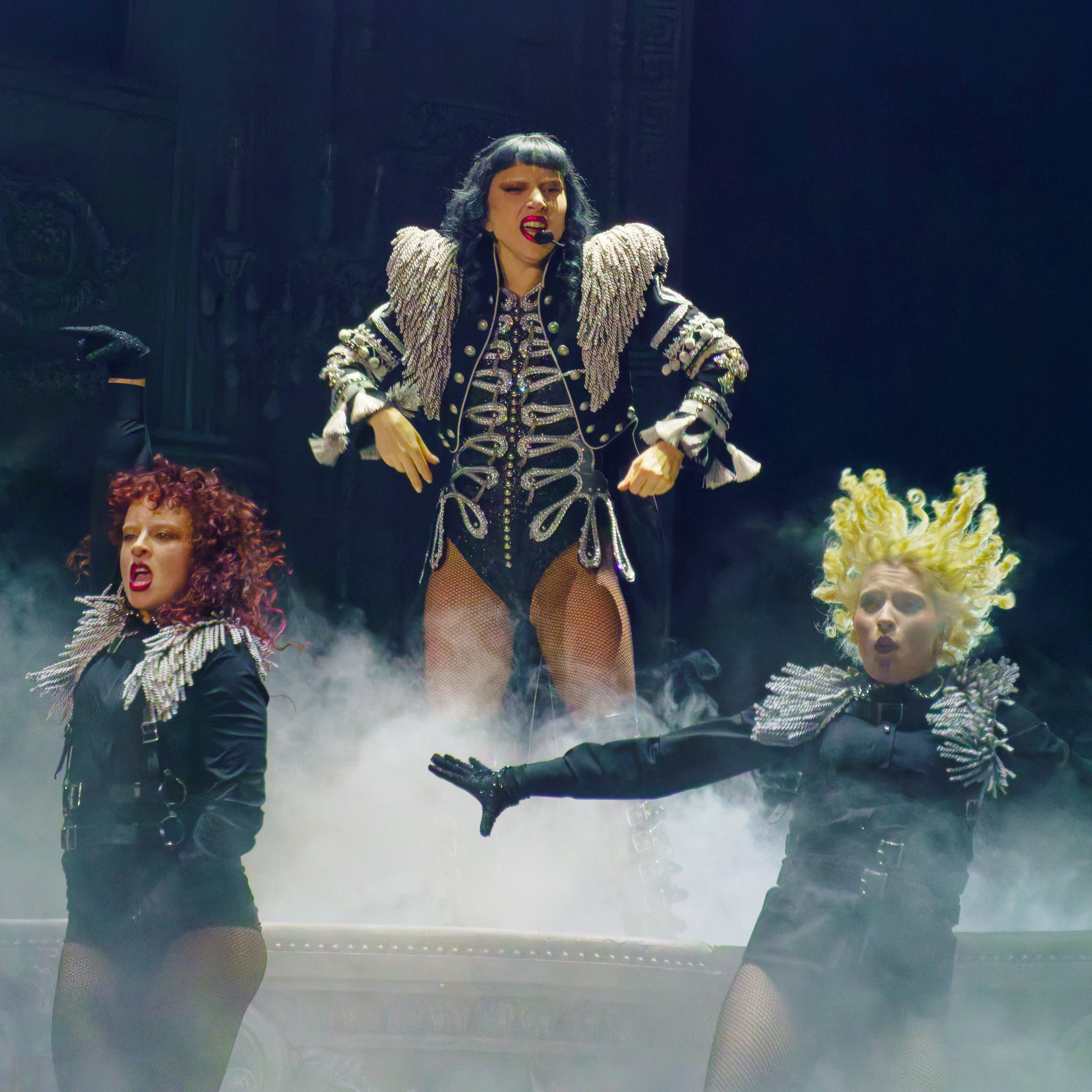
Gaga performing "Shadow of a Man" during the Mayhem Ball tour

Gaga performed "Shadow of a Man" during The Art of Personal Chaos concerts between 2025 and 2026. At the earlier promotional run of shows–which included a headlining set at Coachella–it was performed as a mash-up with fellow Mayhem track "Kill for Love". Gaga was dressed in a gray jacket and hot pants, with Los Angeles Times's Mikael Wood describing her look as "a sexy military officer". Variety's Chris Willman felt the song's "Michael Jackson-ism" was also reflected in the choreography during its live debut. "Shadow of a Man" returned for the show's revamped version for the Mayhem Ball tour, opening the fourth act with an extended introduction and no longer being performed as a mash-up with "Kill for Love". Gaga wore a custom military-style tailcoat by Louis Verdad, with silver crystal crosses, a fitted waist and two long tails. Livia Caligor of W saw the performance as another tribute to Michael Jackson. She found echoes of "Bad" and "Thriller" in the song, while Gaga's tailcoat and armband reminded her of Jackson's costumes from the Dangerous World Tour. Caligor added, "The parallel is clear: this is another artist who also blurred the boundaries between persona, performance, and pain." Robin Murray of Clash called the rendition "impressive".

A reimagined version of "Shadow of a Man" appeared in Gaga's live album and concert film Apple Music Live: Mayhem Requiem, which was released on May 14, 2026, and recorded during an invite-only performance at the Wiltern Theatre in Los Angeles in January 2026.

== Credits and personnel ==
Credits are adapted from the liner notes of Mayhem.

=== Recording ===
- Recorded at Shangri-La, and The Village.
- Mixed at MixStar Studios (Virginia Beach, Virginia)
- Mastered at Sterling Sound (New York City)

=== Personnel ===
- Lady Gaga – vocals, keyboards, synthesizer, composer, producer
- Andrew Watt – keyboards, bass, drums, electric guitar, percussion, composer, producer
- Henry Walter – keyboards, synthesizer, drum programming, composer, producer
- Paul Lamalfa – engineer
- Marco Sonzini – additional engineer
- Tyler Harris – additional engineer
- Serban Ghenea – mixing engineer
- Bryce Bordone – assistant mixing engineer
- Randy Merrill – mastering engineer

== Charts ==
=== Weekly charts ===
Chart (2025)	Peak position
Belarus Airplay (TopHit)	136
Canada Hot 100 (Billboard)	91
CIS Airplay (TopHit)	84
France (SNEP)	164
Global 200 (Billboard)	85
Greece International (IFPI)	43
Peru Anglo (Monitor Latino)	1
Portugal (AFP)	120
Romania Airplay (TopHit)	59
Russia Airplay (TopHit)	55
UK Singles Downloads (Official Charts)	41
UK Singles Sales (OCC)	42
UK Streaming (OCC)	93
US Bubbling Under Hot 100 (Billboard)	2
US Hot Dance/Pop Songs (Billboard)	11
Venezuela Anglo Airplay (Monitor Latino)	2

=== Monthly charts ===
Chart (2025)	Peak position
CIS Airplay (TopHit)	98
Romania Airplay (TopHit)	88
Russia Airplay (TopHit)	70

== Certifications ==
Certifications
Region	Certification	Certified units/sales
Brazil (Pro-Música Brasil)	2× Platinum	80,000^{‡}
^{‡} Sales+streaming figures based on certification alone.
