= Verdad =

Verdad may refer to:

- Verdad (1950), Uruguay
- Louis Verdad, American fashion designer

== See also ==
- La Verdad (disambiguation)
