= Zombieboy =

2025 song by Lady Gaga

Song by Lady Gaga

from the album Mayhem
- Released: March 7, 2025
- Studio: Shangri-La (Malibu)
- Genre: Disco
- Length: 3:33
- Label: Streamline; Interscope
- Songwriters: Lady Gaga; Andrew Watt; Henry Walter; James Fauntleroy
- Producers: Lady Gaga; Andrew Watt; Cirkut

Official audio
- "Zombieboy" on YouTube

"Zombieboy" is a song by Lady Gaga, released on her 2025 album Mayhem. It was written and produced by Lady Gaga, Andrew Watt and Cirkut, with James Fauntleroy providing additional songwriting. A disco track with funk elements, it was compared by journalists to Chic's music catalogue. Lyrically, it is about overindulging during a night out and anticipating an unpleasant morning, likening that feeling to waking up like a zombie. Gaga also pays tribute to the late model Rick Genest, who had the nickname "Zombie Boy". Critics gave positive reviews, praising the track's production and describing it as an album standout. It peaked at number 76 on the Billboard Global 200 and also charted in the United States, Canada, the United Kingdom, Brazil, France, Greece, and Portugal. The song has sparked a dance trend on social media.

Gaga sang "Zombieboy" live at several promotional concerts in 2025, while dancing alongside a skeleton. Further performances include Netflix's Tudum event, where she emerged from a vertical coffin to begin the song, and The Mayhem Ball tour (2025–2026), during which zombie eyes were projected onto audience members via screens. Journalists have frequently noted that the television series Wednesday, in which Gaga made a cameo appearance, was a major inspiration for the aesthetics of the song's live renditions. Gaga also performed a reimagined version of the song for Mayhem Requiem.

== Production and release ==
Lady Gaga wrote and produced "Zombieboy" with Andrew Watt and Cirkut, while James Fauntleroy provided additional songwriting. Paul Lamalfa recorded the track at Shangri-La Studios in Malibu, California; Marco Sonzini provided additional engineering, while Tyler Harris worked as the assistant engineer. "Zombieboy" was mixed by Serban Ghenea at Mixstar Studios in Virginia Beach, Virginia, and mastered by Randy Merrill at Sterling Sound Studios in Edgewater, New Jersey. Gaga additionally played Rhodes piano and keyboards; Watt played drums, percussion, bass guitar, electric guitar, and keyboards; and Cirkut played synthesizer and keyboards and provided drum and bass programming. Bryce Bordone worked as the assistant mixing engineer, and Marc VanGool served as the studio technician.

The track was first teased as a short snippet in the music for the single "Disease", released on October 29, 2024, where a mid-video scene briefly switches to audio from a car radio, momentarily revealing about fifteen seconds of the then-unreleased song as an injured Gaga appears before the vehicle. On March 7, 2025, "Zombieboy" was released as part of the studio album Mayhem (2025), as the seventh track of the record's standard edition.

== Composition and inspirations ==
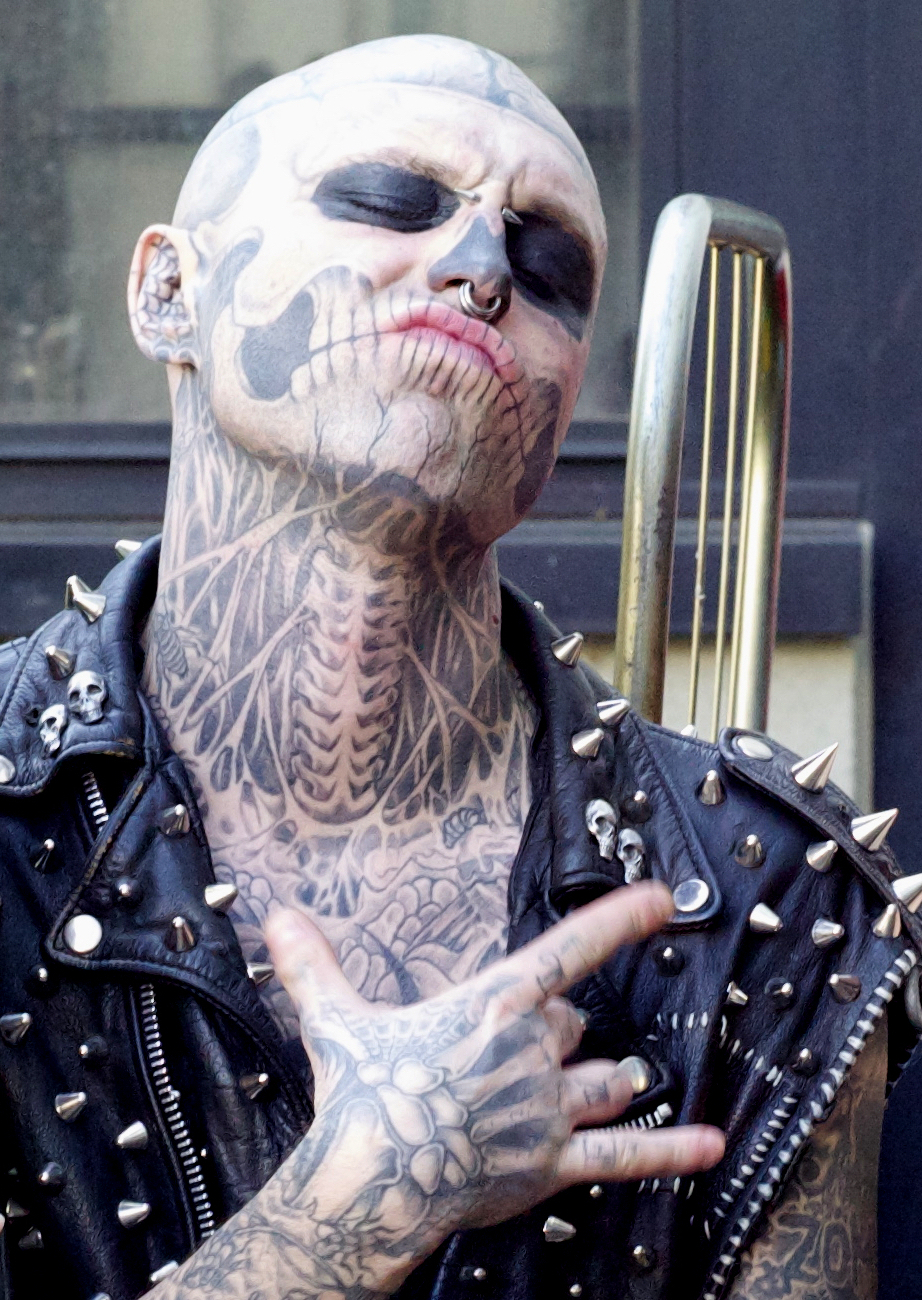
"Zombieboy" pays tribute to the late model Rick Genest (pictured), who appeared in Gaga's 2011 "Born This Way" music video.

"Zombieboy" is a tribute to the late model Rick Genest (1985–2018), who appeared in the music video for Gaga's 2011 song "Born This Way". Genest received the "Zombie Boy" moniker due to the extensive skeleton tattoos that covered much of his body. Gaga explained that Genest had always been a source of inspiration for her, and while working on the track — which she described as an upbeat, celebratory song — the term "zombieboy" simply came to mind. She said the song captures that late-night moment when friends realise they'll feel awful the next morning because they've been having too much fun, comparing it to waking up like a zombie.

"Zombieboy" has been described as a disco song with elements of funk, featuring a hand-clap drum beat, shimmering synths, a hair-metal guitar solo, and a chant reminiscent of double dutch rhymes. It showscases inspirations from the music of the 1980s. Gaga's vocals move between powerful belting and a manic, speak-sung delivery. Journalists from Stereogum noted that in the lyrics, Gaga pleads for the attention of a man who is long gone, and her line "Goodbye, I'll see you in my dreams" serves as a poignant gesture of releasing her demons while reconnecting with her human side. Some outlets highlighted the "Put your paws all over me" lyric as being a callback to Gaga's early songs, such as "Born This Way" and The Fame Monster's "Monster" (2009), where she similarly used the word "paws" as a substitute for hands.

Several journalists opined that the American disco band Chic was a clear inspiration for "Zombieboy". Due to its chanting segment, it received further comparisons to Gwen Stefani's 2005 pop/hip-hop song, "Hollaback Girl" (2005). For The Line of Best Fit's David Cobbald, "Zombieboy" evoked "Get Down On It" (1981) by Kool & The Gang, particularly recalling the line "Get your back up off the wall!". Helen Brown of The Independent compared the track's bassline to that of "Love Is the Drug" (1975) by Roxy Music. For Marcus Wratten of PinkNews, it felt like "classic glam-rock meets The B-52s".

== Critical reception ==
Stephen Daw of Billboard ranked "Zombieboy" as the third-best track on Mayhem, calling it a "one-of-a-kind jam" that provides "a much-needed switch-up" with its playful campiness—contrasting with the darker, more serious tone of much of the album—and channels the indulgent energy that first drew fans to Gaga in 2008. The Guardian's Alexis Petridis regarded it an illustration of the album's consistently sharp writing—full of hooks and marked by unexpected musical detours. Out's Taylor Henderson deemed it "instantly iconic", while Donovan Livesey of MusicOMH envisioned the song as one of Mayhem's "future classics". Entertainment Weekly's Wesley Stenzel and Paste's Sam Rosenberg both considered it a Halloween-inspired bop for the dancefloor. NME's Nick Levine found it a "disco-rap banger", noting that Gaga "sounds a bit like a musical theatre kid channelling Blondie's Debbie Harry – but just about gets away with it".

Vogue's Christian Allaire said "Zombieboy" and "Garden of Eden" are "sexy pop bangers certain to be hits in all the gay clubs". Stephen Ackroyd of Dork had a similar opinion, and considered the two tracks "a pair of gloriously camp club ragers destined to become late-night anthems for the creatures of the night". JT Early of Beats Per Minute called "Zombieboy" a "deliciously fun romp", and characterized it as "the darker sister to 'Killah' with its more aggressive retro stylings". Rolling Stone's Brittany Spanos described it as "a little Artpop meets The Fame," calling it "a cute and sexy track". Kristen S. Hé of Vulture opined it is "the one Mayhem track that actually could have appeared on The Fame exactly as it is", adding that Andrew Watt's Van Halen–inspired shredding gives it a fresh twist, and while it may feel like a retread, "a little nostalgia is welcome when it sounds this smooth". Gary Grimes of Attitude also felt that it recalls Gaga's early work, especially "Disco Heaven" from The Fame, while noting "she sounds at home, and the end result is a lot of fun".

Chris Hedden of Screen Rant wrote that, while the track functions more as a lighthearted filler than a centerpiece on Mayhem, its smooth, playful energy and Gaga's signature lively vocals are likely to appeal to fans. Megan Lapierre of Exclaim! said the track is the sort of delightfully weird, slightly cringey style she expects from Gaga, even if it's not exactly her thing. In a more negative assessment, Ludovic Hunter-Tilney of Financial Times felt it is "an expertly observed but flat recreation" of the music of the 1980s. Peter Piatkowski of PopMatters found it "shockingly dull and rote".

== Commercial performance ==
During the release week of Mayhem, "Zombieboy" entered the Billboard Global 200 at number 76. It was one of twelve tracks from the album to appear on the chart, ranking as the eighth highest-charting track among them. In the United States, it debuted at number 85 on the Billboard Hot 100 for the week of March 22, 2025, and reached number 6 on the Hot Dance/Pop Songs chart. On the latter chart, Gaga simultaneously placed nine tracks from the album, with "Zombieboy" ranking as the fifth highest-positioned track. In Canada, it peaked at number 85 on the Canadian Hot 100, while in Brazil it reached number 95 on the Brasil Hot 100 and received a double-platinum certification from Pro-Música Brasil. In the United Kingdom, the track debuted at number 76 on the UK Streaming Chart for the week of March 20. In France, it entered the top 200 at number 141, and in Greece, it charted at number 42 on the Digital Singles Chart.

== Live performances ==
The first live performances of "Zombieboy" took place during several promotional concerts for Mayhem in 2025, beginning with a headlining set at Coachella. Gaga appeared in a blue corset, and along with her backup dancers, partner-danced with skeletons during the song. Rolling Stone's Tomás Mier felt "Gaga was channeling a Wednesday Addams-esque narrative" for "Zombieboy". Reviewing one of the concerts in Mexico City, Jamie Fullerton of The Daily Telegraph observed a slight decrease in energy during the show's third segment and said that "Zombieboy" was styled more for an intimate, salon-like setting than a stadium performance, although the presence of Gaga and her dancers, along with the use of skeleton props, maintained audience engagement. Writing about the Rio de Janeiro show, Leonardo Lichote of Folha de S.Paulo noted that the performance contained elements familiar to Brazilian audiences, highlighting a festive, carnival-like aesthetic; the skeleton dance in "Zombieboy" evoked traditional Brazilian celebrations while still fitting into the context of a pop concert.

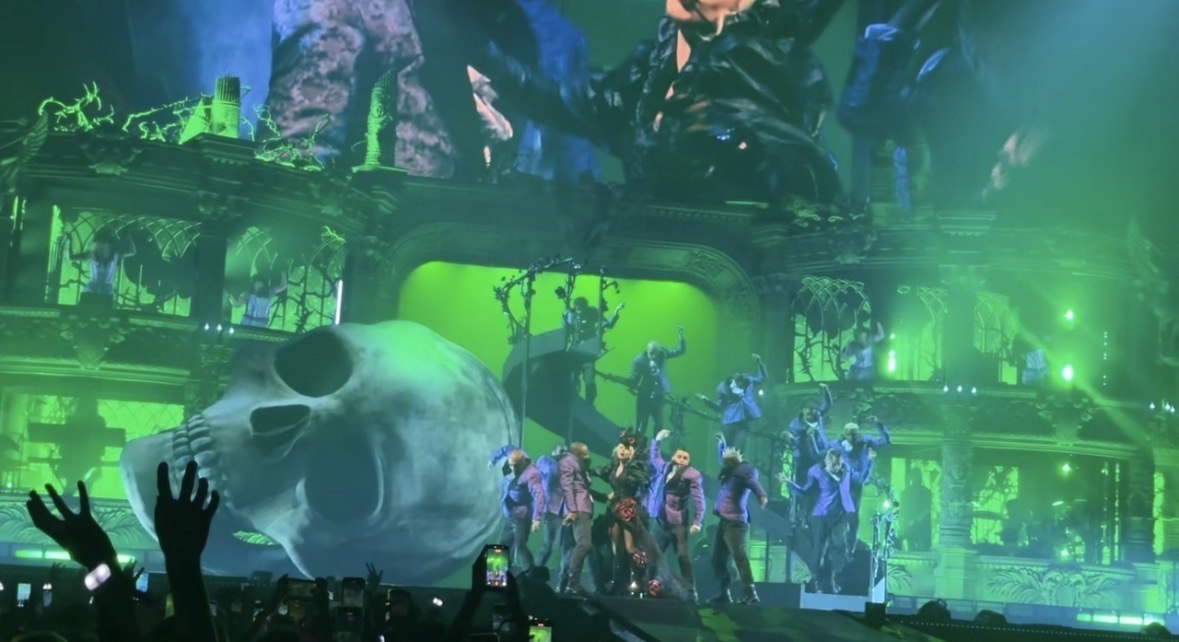
Gaga performing "Zombieboy" during the Mayhem Ball tour, in 2025

On May 31, 2025, Gaga took part in Netflix's Tudum event with a special performance inspired by Wednesday. She emerged from a vertical coffin bearing the inscription "Here lies the monster queen", and performed "Zombieboy" and "Abracadabra", both incorporating elements from The Addams Family theme song. For "Zombieboy", Gaga's gothic look involved a black robe adorned with rose appliqués along the collar, layered over a matching black dress. Her platinum-blonde hair was styled with height and volume in a dramatic bouffant, complemented by bold black eyeshadow and red lipstick. She was accompanied by dancers resembling The Addams Family and Wednesday character, Gomez Addams.

"Zombieboy" was included in the set list of the Mayhem Ball concert tour (2025–2026), with a giant skull placed on stage as prop. Gaga performed the song in a black, crisp taffeta gown, accompanied by her Gomez-inspired dancers dressed in purple jackets. During the performance, screens projected audience members with glowing green eyes resembling zombies. Journalists noted Wednesday and Beetlejuice (1988) as influences for the segment.

A reimagined version of "Zombieboy" appeared in Gaga's concert film and live album Apple Music Live: Mayhem Requiem, released on May 14, 2026. Recorded during an invite-only performance at the Wiltern Theatre in Los Angeles in January 2026, the version features a more prominent synthesizer-driven arrangement and a synthwave style.

== Other appearances ==
In March 2026, "Zombieboy" inspired a dance trend on TikTok featuring stiff, jerking movements reminiscent of a zombie, and choreography comparable to the dance from Michael Jackson's Thriller (1983). Gaga joined the trend by posting a 12-second video of herself performing the routine to the song's chorus while wearing a black dress and hat. In the clip, she convulses to the beat, extends her arms in a zombie-like pose and curls her fingers like claws. "Zombieboy" was also included in the rhythm game Just Dance 2026 Edition, which was released on October 14, 2025. In May 2026, the song appeared in "The Practice", the second episode of the Prime Video series Off Campus, and was also used in a lip-sync battle in the third episode of RuPaul's Drag Race All Stars season 11.

== Credits and personnel ==
Credits are adapted from the liner notes of Mayhem.

Recording

- Recorded at Shangri-La, and The Village.
- Mixed at MixStar Studios (Virginia Beach, Virginia)
- Mastered at Sterling Sound (New York City)

Personnel

- Lady Gaga – songwriter, producer, lead vocals, background vocals, Rhodes piano, keyboards
- Andrew Watt – songwriter, producer, drums, percussion, bass guitar, electric guitar, keyboards
- Cirkut – songwriter, producer, synthesizer, keyboards, drum programming, bass programming
- James Fauntleroy – songwriter
- Paul Lamalfa – recording engineer
- Serban Ghenea – mixing engineer
- Randy Merrill – mastering engineer
- Marco Sonzini – additional engineer
- Tyler Harris – assistant engineer
- Bryce Bordone – assistant mixing engineer
- Marc VanGool – studio technician

== Charts ==
Chart performance
Chart (2025)	Peak position
Brazil Hot 100 (Billboard)	95
Canada Hot 100 (Billboard)	85
France (SNEP)	141
Global 200 (Billboard)	76
Greece International (IFPI)	42
Portugal (AFP)	103
UK Streaming (OCC)	76
US Billboard Hot 100	85
US Hot Dance/Pop Songs (Billboard)	6

== Certifications ==
Certifications
Region	Certification	Certified units/sales
Brazil (Pro-Música Brasil)	2× Platinum	80,000^{‡}
^{‡} Sales+streaming figures based on certification alone.
