= LoveDrug =

2025 song by Lady Gaga

Song by Lady Gaga

from the album Mayhem
- Released: March 7, 2025
- Studio: Shangri-La (Malibu)
- Genre: Dance-rock
- Length: 3:13
- Label: Streamline; Interscope
- Songwriters: Lady Gaga; Andrew Watt; Henry Walter; Michael Polansky
- Producers: Lady Gaga; Andrew Watt; Cirkut

Official audio
- "LoveDrug" on YouTube

"LoveDrug" is a 2025 song by Lady Gaga, released on her album Mayhem (2025). It was written and produced by Lady Gaga, Andrew Watt and Cirkut, with Michael Polansky providing additional songwriting. Gaga, Watt and Walter not only produced the track, but also played its instrumentation. The song incorporates elements of pop and electronic music within the album's broader musical style.

The song received generally positive reviews, with several publications highlighting it as one of the stronger tracks on Mayhem. Commercially, it charted in multiple countries following the release of its parent album, including Canada, France, the United States and the United Kingdom, as well as on the Billboard Global 200. Between 2025 and 2026, Gaga performed the song during the Mayhem Ball tour and reimagined it for the one-off concert Mayhem Requiem.

== Production and composition ==
Lady Gaga wrote and produced "LoveDrug" with Andrew Watt and Cirkut, while Gaga's fiancé, Michael Polansky, provided additional songwriting. Paul Lamalfa recorded the track at Shangri-La Studios in Malibu, California; Marco Sonzini provided additional engineering, while Tyler Harris worked as the assistant engineer. "LoveDrug" was mixed by Serban Ghenea at Mixstar Studios in Virginia Beach, Virginia, and mastered by Randy Merrill at Sterling Sound Studios in Edgewater, New Jersey. Gaga additionally played keyboards; Watt played drums, percussion, acoustic guitar, electric guitar, and keyboards; and Cirkut played synthesizer and keyboards and provided drum and bass programming. Bryce Bordone worked as the assistant mixing engineer, and Marc VanGool served as the studio technician.

Stef Rubino of Autostraddle described "LoveDrug" as "heavy hooked" and "80's rock tinged". Billboard's Stephen Daw said, "Embodying AOR bands like Boston and Foreigner, 'LoveDrug' feels like a perfect transition song between Mayhem's front and back halves, bridging the gap between the twisted, dark imagery of the first seven songs and the more light-hearted, love-tinged fare of the last 6. It helps plenty that Gaga's voice sounds excellent as she belts out the instantly-catchy chorus". Alexis Petridis of The Guardian said the song "indulges Gaga's love of AOR, but a four-to-the-floor rhythm means it doesn't jar with its surroundings". Screen Rant's Chris Hedden said the song has a "thumping" dance beat. The Line of Best Fit's David Cobbald noted that Gaga is singing in her head voice during the main hook of the track.

== Critical reception ==
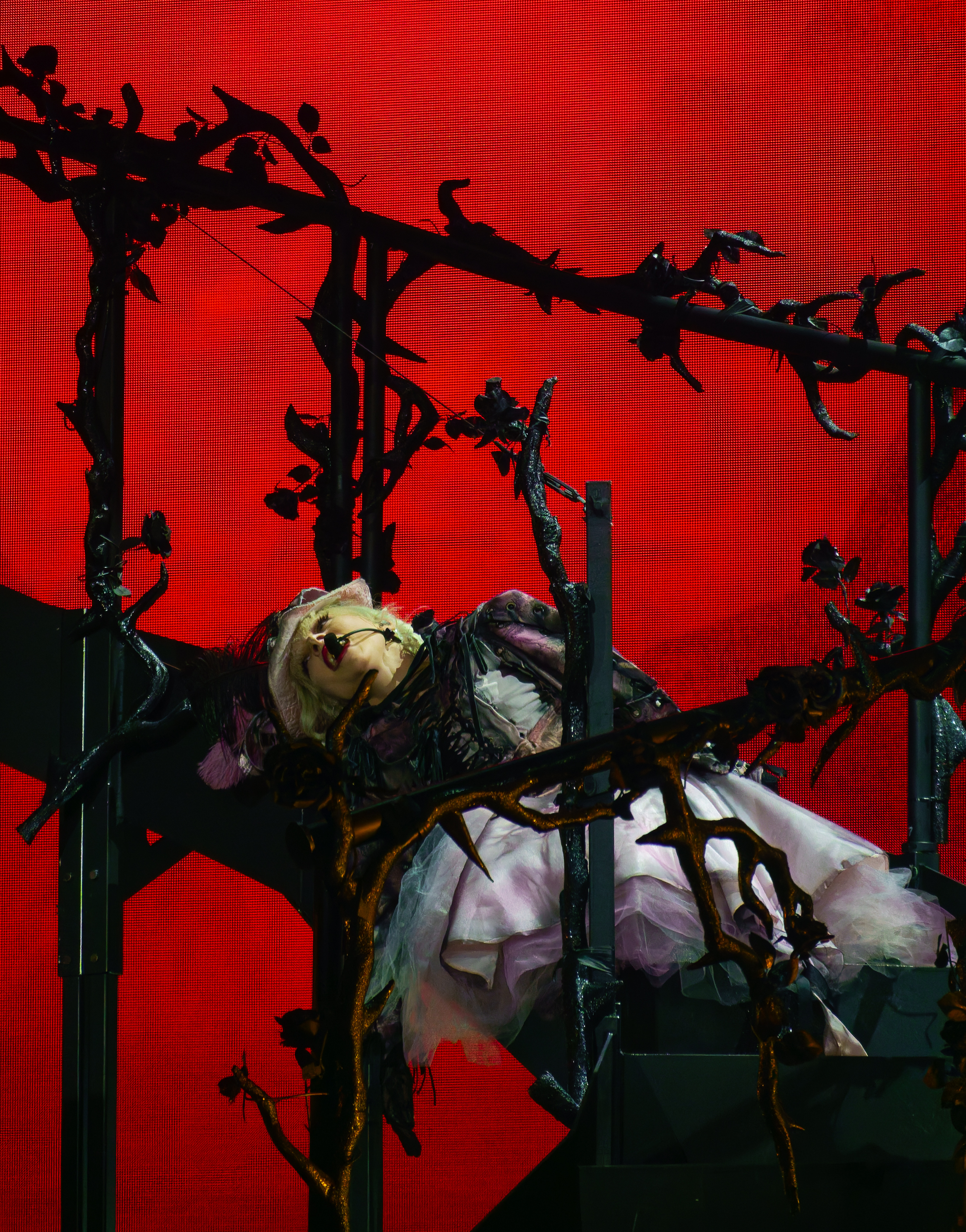
Gaga performing "LoveDrug" during The Mayhem Ball tour

"LoveDrug" received generally positive reviews, with several publications highlighting it as one of the stronger tracks on Mayhem. American Songwriter's Lauren Boisvert said the song "feels like a return to old Gaga perfectly blended with modern Gaga". Craig Jenkins of Vulture said it has "Olivia Newton-John and Pat Benatar vibes" and a "Ratatat-ish closing dual-lead-guitar riff [that] dovetails with Andrew Watt's production work, which yields either instant vintage or pre-distressed jeans and nothing in between". Kristen S. Hé, also from Vulture wrote, "It's one of Mayhem's stronger tracks, but it doesn't fully achieve liftoff, teasing an epic ending before flowing back into the suite that forms the album's second half". Adam White of The Independent wrote, "One of the more innocuous numbers on Mayhem, this sounds a lot like a Pat Benatar B-side from 1985 – which may have been the intention". Writing for Salon, Coleman Spilde found the track "a top-down-on-the-desert-highway '80s firecracker where Gaga uses her vocal prowess to an appropriately intoxicating effect".

The Atlantic's Spencer Kornhaber said the song "imagines what a duet between Daft Punk and the E Street Band would sound like", while Sam Rosenberg of Paste described it as feeling like a "leftover" from either the Weeknd's After Hours or Miley Cyrus's Plastic Hearts, both released in 2020. Megan Lapierre of Exclaim! highlighted "LoveDrug" for its lyrics, saying it was the only track on Mayhem that really surprised her, particularly with its "spectacular" opening lines, "River in my eyes, I've got a poem in my throat / I hear the music and it takes me by surprise". Dakota West Foss of Sputnikmusic said "LoveDrug" and "Shadow of a Man" give "some sonic consistency by going for a bit of an evil Abba vibe that contains Ratatat-esque guitar licks that hit pay dirt for some of the most moment-to-moment fun throughout". Robin Murray of Clash magazine called the song "superb" and said Gaga "leans on her imposing vocal chops".

In a more mixed assessment, Peter Piatkowski of PopMatters believed the track "has a lot of promise as a 2020s take on 1980s diva new wave rock, but lacks the delirious camp that defines Gagas's best musical moments". Gary Grimes of Attitude considered the song enjoyable but suggested that its limited ambition makes it seem somewhat out of place on a 2025 Gaga album. Lindsay Zoladz of The New York Times felt the midtempo track "gets lost in lyrical clichés".

== Commercial performance ==
"LoveDrug" charted in several countries following the release of Mayhem. The song debuted at number 103 on the Billboard Global 200, a chart that ranks the most streamed and best-selling songs worldwide. In the United States, it debuted at number 95 on the Billboard Hot 100 and reached number 9 on the Hot Dance/Pop Songs chart, both for the week of March 22, 2025. In Canada, it peaked at number 88 on the Canadian Hot 100. In the United Kingdom, it debuted at number 76 on the UK Singles Downloads Chart and number 80 on the UK Singles Sales Chart. In France, the track entered at number 183 on the SNEP Top 200. Although it did not chart in Brazil, Pro-Música Brasil awarded the song a Platinum certification.

== Live performances and media usage ==
Gaga first performed "LoveDrug" live during the Mayhem Ball tour (2025–2026), descending a spiral staircase as she sang the song. At the September 29, 2025, concert in London, Wednesday cast members Emma Myers and Evie Templeton joined her on stage for the performance of "The Dead Dance" and "LoveDrug". A stripped-down rendition of "LoveDrug" appeared in Gaga's live album and concert film Apple Music Live: Mayhem Requiem, which was released on May 14, 2026, and recorded during an invite-only performance at the Wiltern Theatre in Los Angeles in January 2026. It incorporated elements of electronica and vocodered vocals.

The song is featured in the film The Thursday Murder Club (2025).

== Credits and personnel ==
Credits are adapted from the liner notes of Mayhem.

- Lady Gaga – songwriter, producer, lead vocals, background vocals, keyboards
- Andrew Watt – songwriter, producer, drums, percussion, acoustic guitar, electric guitar, keyboards
- Cirkut – songwriter, producer, synthesizer, keyboards, drum programming, bass programming
- Michael Polansky – songwriter
- Paul Lamalfa – recording engineer
- Serban Ghenea – mixing engineer
- Randy Merrill – mastering engineer
- Marco Sonzini – additional engineer
- Tyler Harris – assistant engineer
- Bryce Bordone – assistant mixing engineer
- Marc VanGool – studio technician

== Charts ==
Chart (2025)	Peak position
Canada Hot 100 (Billboard)	88
France (SNEP)	183
Global 200 (Billboard)	103
UK Singles Downloads (Official Charts)	76
UK Singles Sales (OCC)	80
US Billboard Hot 100	95
US Hot Dance/Pop Songs (Billboard)	9

== Certifications ==
Certifications
Region	Certification	Certified units/sales
Brazil (Pro-Música Brasil)	Platinum	40,000^{‡}
^{‡} Sales+streaming figures based on certification alone.
