= Killah (song) =

2025 song by Lady Gaga featuring Gesaffelstein

Song by Lady Gaga featuring Gesaffelstein

from the album Mayhem
- Released: March 7, 2025
- Studio: Shangri-La (Malibu)
- Genre: Electro-funk; industrial; techno; funk rock
- Length: 3:30
- Label: Interscope
- Songwriters: Lady Gaga; Andrew Watt; Henry Walter; Mike Lévy
- Producers: Lady Gaga; Gesaffelstein; Andrew Watt; Cirkut

Official audio
- "Killah" on YouTube

"Killah" is a song by American singer Lady Gaga featuring French musician Gesaffelstein, from Gaga's seventh studio album, Mayhem (2025). It was written and produced by Gaga, Gesaffelstein, Andrew Watt, and Cirkut, and recorded at Shangri-La Studios in Malibu, California. Gaga had initially sought to collaborate with Gesaffelstein while developing Artpop (2013), but the collaboration did not materialize until Mayhem. She later identified "Killah" as her favorite song to create for the album, describing it as a departure from her previous musical work.

Musically, "Killah" is an electro-funk and industrial song incorporating elements of funk rock and techno. It combines prominent guitar riffs, heavy bass, and electronic programming, culminating in an extended techno breakdown featuring a prolonged scream from Gaga. Its lyrics portray Gaga as a femme fatale, intertwining sexual desire with murderous imagery. Music critics compared the song's sound to the work of Prince and David Bowie, with several identifying it as a standout track on Mayhem. "Killah" received praise for its experimental sound, genre combinations, and Gaga's vocal delivery, although some reviewers were less enthusiastic about its production. Billboard ranked it at number 56 on its list of the best songs of 2025.

"Killah" appeared on several national record charts, including the US Billboard Hot 100, where it peaked at number 93, and the Hot Dance/Pop Songs chart, where it reached number eight. It was also certified platinum in Brazil. Gaga debuted the song live on Saturday Night Live in March 2025 and subsequently performed it during The Art of Personal Chaos concerts, including her Coachella headlining performance, where Gesaffelstein joined her onstage. The song remained in the setlist when the show was revised for the Mayhem Ball tour. It also appeared in Gaga's concert film Apple Music Live: Mayhem Requiem (2026).

== Background and recording ==
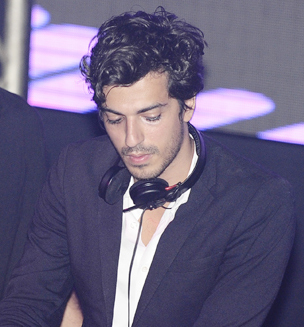
Gesaffelstein (pictured in 2012) is a featured artist on the track.

Lady Gaga first sought to collaborate with French producer Gesaffelstein while developing her third studio album, Artpop (2013), but the collaboration did not materialize. More than a decade later, they worked together during the recording of her album Mayhem (2025), which took place throughout 2023 and 2024 at Shangri-La Studios in Malibu, California. Gesaffelstein contributed to three songs on the album: "Killah", "Garden of Eden", and "Blade of Grass". Gaga explained that she had initially approached their collaboration with preconceived ideas about his musical style, but discovered that he had a strong appreciation for classic music. She felt that their shared rebellious approach to making music was more important than adhering to a particular sound. Gesaffelstein's longtime manager Alexandra Pilz-Hayot described his work with Gaga as an especially easy collaboration, attributing this to the two artists' mutual musical understanding.

Gaga wrote and produced "Killah" alongside Gesaffelstein, Andrew Watt, and Cirkut. The song was recorded by Paul Lamalfa at Shangri-La Studios, with Watt contributing electric guitar, Chad Smith playing drums, and the producers providing keyboards, synthesizers, and electronic programming. It was mixed by Serban Ghenea at Mixstar Studios in Virginia Beach, Virginia, and mastered by Randy Merrill at Sterling Sound Studios in Edgewater, New Jersey. Recalling the recording process, Cirkut said that Gaga surprised the producers with a prolonged scream during the song's bridge. The atmosphere in the studio prompted them to record their own shouting and laughter, which they incorporated into the finished track.

Gaga described "Killah" as primarily Gesaffelstein's creative vision, noting that its musical approach was unfamiliar to both of them. At a press conference hosted by Spotify, she named it her favorite song to create for Mayhem, although she selected "Blade of Grass" as her favorite finished track. She also identified "Killah" as one of the songs that pushed her furthest outside her comfort zone because its rhythm and groove differed from anything she had previously recorded. Although she acknowledged experiencing personal insecurity, Gaga regarded the song as an expression of her greatest confidence. She likened its place within the album's narrative of a night out to the moment when someone feels at their best.

== Music and lyrics ==
"Killah" is an electro-funk and industrial song incorporating elements of funk rock and techno. Gaga characterized its sound as "industrial funk", noting that neither she nor Gesaffelstein had previously made a recording quite like it. The composition combines prominent electric guitar riffs, synthesizers, heavy bass, and programmed percussion. Steffanee Wang of The Fader identified the bright guitar tones as reminiscent of Prince, while Rolling Stone compared the song's sound to David Bowie's "Fame" (1975) and "I'm Afraid of Americans" (1997). CJ Thorpe-Tracey of The Quietus similarly compared the song's music and lyrics to Prince's work during his Sign o' the Times era, particularly noting similarities in the verse melodies. Rich Juzwiak of Pitchfork additionally compared the song's combination of funk and industrial elements to KMFDM's "Money" (1992).

"Killah"
A 21-second excerpt of the song's industrial techno breakdown, featuring Gesaffelstein's synthesizers and electronic percussion alongside Gaga's prolonged scream.

The song's arrangement combines a funk-driven rhythm with a more abrasive electronic sound, culminating in an extended instrumental breakdown. Towards its conclusion, the guitars and electronic percussion intensify before the rhythm shifts into double time. Alexis Petridis of The Guardian described the accelerated section as incorporating elements of new wave rock and techstep drum and bass, while Thorpe-Tracey compared the outro to Berlin-style techno. The breakdown also features a prolonged scream from Gaga, after which the instrumentation continues to build. James Factora of Them identified a recurring synthesizer bass riff as the song's foundation. He described the instrumental breakdown towards the end as progressively accelerating before briefly fading to a low hum and returning to the main riff. Billboard's Stephen Daw noted Gaga's staccato breathing and theatrical vocal delivery, and Pitchfork's Juzwiak described her final lines as featuring a Dracula-like quaver.

Lyrically, "Killah" portrays Gaga as a nightclub femme fatale who uses murderous imagery to describe her encounters with men, as observed by Livia Caligor of Teen Vogue. India Block of the Evening Standard similarly noted that the lyrics alternate between expressions of sexual desire and threats of violence. Gaga described the song as being primarily about sex and lust, contrasting its confident perspective with the insecurity expressed in "Blade of Grass", another track from Mayhem.

== Critical reception ==
Steven J. Horowitz of Variety described "Killah" as "a bold and confident track," noting its fusion of electro-funk and industrial techno. Dakota West Foss of Sputnikmusic considered it one of the album's biggest sonic surprises, praising its "impressive switcheroo" and particularly strong bass. Billboard's Stephen Daw noted that Gesaffelstein's collaboration "elevates the song to another dimension, with an interlude that transports us to a Berlin nightclub." Spencer Kornhaber of The Atlantic found it to be "wonderfully unhinged", with Gaga adopting a darker "nightclub seductress" persona. CJ Thorpe-Tracey of The Quietus saw it as an homage to Prince's sound, emphasizing "the mix of sensuality and danger in Gaga's performance." Ludovic Hunter-Tilney of the Financial Times similarly viewed "Killah" as a Prince tribute blended with Gaga's signature electronic pop, calling the track "a treat" despite his otherwise negative assessment of Mayhem.

Evening Standard's India Block praised the track's sonic combination, calling it "fun and cruel." JT Early of Beats Per Minute found the song "the pinnacle of slick, funky rock", complimenting its 1980s-style guitar riffs, Gaga's confident delivery and "gloriously catchy" hook. Chris Hedden of Screen Rant praised "Killah" for its humor and playful delivery, noting Gaga's "confident self-assurance", double entendres and climactic scream. Kristen S. Hé of Vulture called it "an absolute joy", where everyone "were clearly having the time of their lives making this", adding that Gaga was at her "silliest" since the release of "Applause" (2013). Gary Grimes of Attitude compared "Killah" to the Born This Way (2011) tracks "Electric Chapel" and "Bad Kids". MusicOMH's Donovan Livesey similarly linked the song to the darker dance-pop of The Fame Monster (2009) and Born This Way, praising its "gloriously excessive, more-is-more production" and its lasting impact despite not matching the instant-classic quality of "Bad Romance".

Alexis Petridis of The Guardian stated that "Killah" stands out within the album for its "unexpected production shifts." AllMusic's Neil Z. Yeung found the track one of the album's best moments, describing it as "a collaboration with Gesaffelstein that blends Bowie and Prince's influence with the intensity of St. Vincent or Trent Reznor." David Cobbald of The Line of Best Fit felt that while the production was ambitious, it did not reach the depth of Gesaffelstein's previous works with The Weeknd. Peter Piatkowski of PopMatters found the "sassy" track a "superb moment", and a "sincere tribute to Bowie". Billboard included "Killah" on its list of the 100 best songs of 2025, placing it at number 56 and noting its chaotic energy and experimental blend of industrial and funk elements. Stephen Daw highlighted its "wonderfully weird" production, its intense techno breakdown, and Gaga's 17-second scream.

== Commercial performance ==
After the release of Mayhem, "Killah" debuted at number 95 on the Billboard Global 200 for the chart dated March 22, 2025. It was one of twelve tracks from the album to appear on the chart, ranking as the tenth highest-charting track among them. In the United States, the song entered the Billboard Hot 100 at number 93, while reaching number 8 on the Hot Dance/Pop Songs chart. On the latter chart, Gaga simultaneously placed nine songs from the album, with "Killah" ranking as the sixth highest-positioned track. In Canada, it debuted at number 87 on the Canadian Hot 100, while in the United Kingdom, it entered the UK Streaming Chart at number 82. Although it did not chart in Brazil, Pro-Música Brasil awarded the song a platinum certification.

== Live performances ==
On March 8, 2025, Gaga performed "Killah" live for the first time on Saturday Night Live as part of its fiftieth season, along with "Abracadabra". The performance began in the hallways of Studio 8H, where Gaga and her dancers interacted with security cameras before returning to the main stage. For the performance, she wore a purple outfit, interpreted by Variety's Chris Willman as a tribute to Prince, one of the song's primary influences. Willman described the performance as "one of her most frenetic and immersive." Kristen S. Hé of Vulture called it "unforgettable", describing Gaga as "skulking" through the hallways "like a woman possessed".

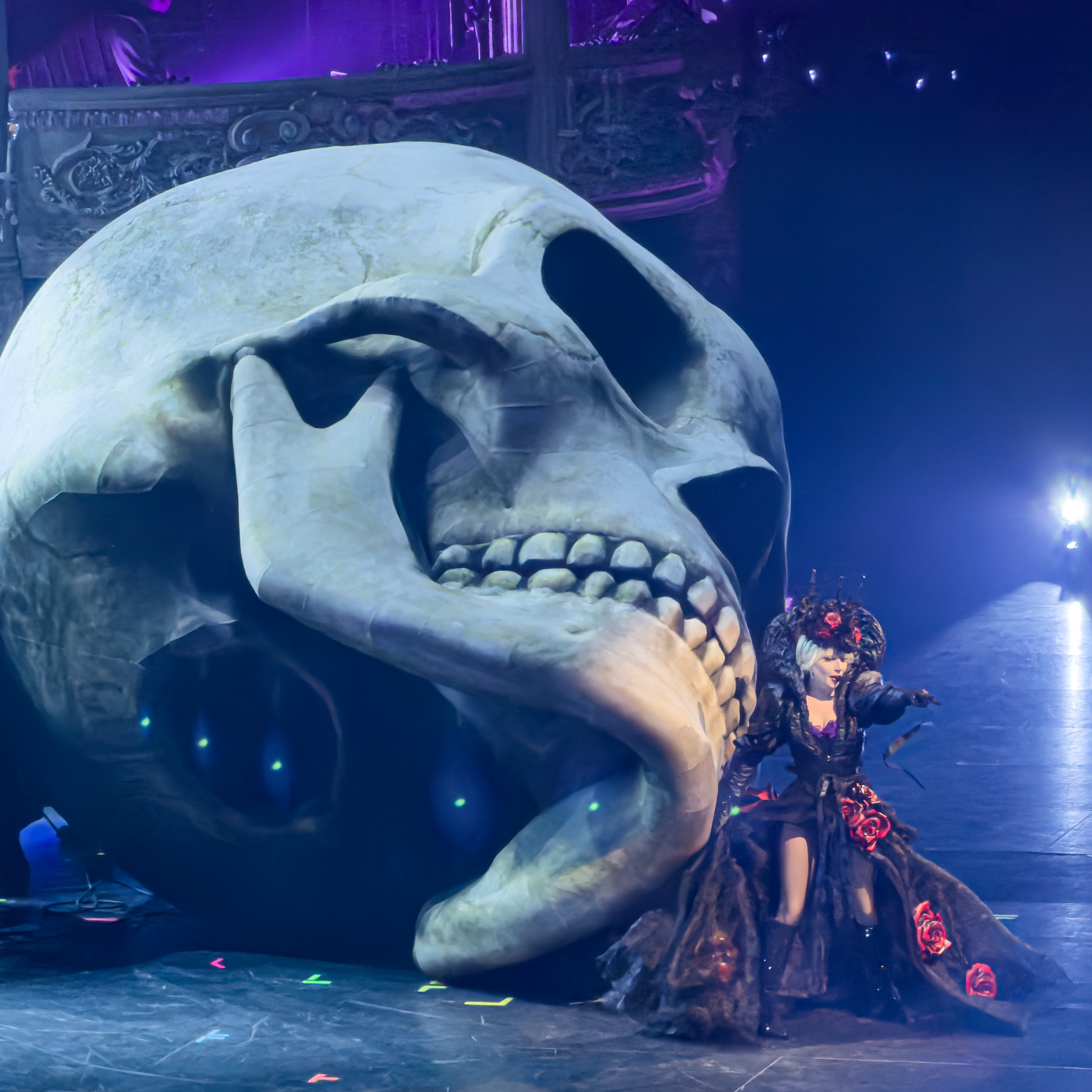
Gaga performing "Killah" during the Mayhem Ball tour in front of a giant skull

In 2025–2026, Gaga added "Killah" to the setlist of The Art of Personal Chaos concerts. In its initial run of shows, which included a headlining set at Coachella, she was wearing a blue and glittering black leotard paired with a dramatic blue ruffled coat during the song. For the first weekend of Coachella, she was accompanied on keyboard by Gesaffelstein, who appeared on stage wearing his trademark sleek black suit and a gleaming chrome mask. Gaga paused to quickly dance with him before walking down the stage, where she played a drum set lifted by her dancers. Reviewing the Mexico City show for The Daily Telegraph, Jamie Fullerton wrote that the concert's third act lost momentum during "Killah", comparing its riffs unfavourably to Prince's "Kiss" (1986). The Art of Personal Chaos show was updated for the Mayhem Ball tour, where "Killah" was staged with gothic imagery, as Gaga performed before a large spinning skull in a darkly ornate costume adorned with roses. The stage was illuminated with purple lights during the performance; Melissa Ruggieri of USA Today found it to be another nod to Prince. Joe Lynch of Billboard wrote that the staging allowed Gaga to appear "funky and freaky", as she spun down the runway before delivering an extended scream. Reviewing the tour for The Times, Will Hodgkinson described "Killah" as a "searing gothic metal overload" that nevertheless fit into Gaga's camp theatricality, writing that it was "about as heavy as a guest spot by Cher in a drag club".

"Killah" also appeared in Gaga's live album and concert film Apple Music Live: Mayhem Requiem, which was released on May 14, 2026, and recorded during an invite-only performance at the Wiltern Theatre in Los Angeles in January 2026. The song was presented in a heavier industrial arrangement that incorporated elements of Nine Inch Nails' "Closer" (1994), with Paper's Taylor Lomax singling out the performance as one of the project's highlights.

While touring in support of his 2024 studio album Gamma, Gesaffelstein performed "Killah" in a mashup with his own tracks "Mania" and "Hysteria". On January 23, 2026, he released the live album Enter the Gamma (Live), which contains the mashup as its final track.

== Credits and personnel ==
Credits are adapted from the liner notes of Mayhem.

- Lady Gaga – songwriter, producer, lead vocals, background vocals, keyboards
- Andrew Watt – songwriter, producer, electric guitar, keyboards
- Cirkut – songwriter, producer, synthesizer, keyboards, drum programming, bass programming
- Gesaffelstein – songwriter, producer, synthesizer, drum programming, bass programming
- Chad Smith – drums
- Paul Lamalfa – recording engineer
- Serban Ghenea – mixing engineer
- Randy Merrill – mastering engineer
- Marco Sonzini – additional engineer
- Tyler Harris – assistant engineer
- Bryce Bordone – assistant mixing engineer
- Marc VanGool – studio technician

== Charts ==
Chart (2025)	Peak position
Canada Hot 100 (Billboard)	87
France (SNEP)	194
Global 200 (Billboard)	95
Greece International (IFPI)	73
Portugal (AFP)	136
UK Streaming (OCC)	82
US Billboard Hot 100	93
US Hot Dance/Pop Songs (Billboard)	8

== Certifications ==
Certifications
Region	Certification	Certified units/sales
Brazil (Pro-Música Brasil)	Platinum	40,000^{‡}
^{‡} Sales+streaming figures based on certification alone.
