= Perfect Celebrity =

2025 song by Lady Gaga

Song by Lady Gaga

from the album Mayhem
- Released: March 7, 2025
- Studio: Shangri-La (Malibu, CA)
- Genre: Electropop; trip hop; arena rock
- Length: 3:49
- Label: Interscope
- Songwriters: Lady Gaga; Andrew Watt; Henry Walter; Mike Lévy
- Producers: Lady Gaga; Andrew Watt; Cirkut

Audio video
- "Perfect Celebrity" on YouTube

"Perfect Celebrity" is a song by the American singer-songwriter Lady Gaga, released as the fourth track from her sixth solo studio album, Mayhem (2025). An electropop, trip hop and arena rock song, She produced it alongside Cirkut and Andrew Watt, and the three wrote the track with additional writing from Gesaffelstein. Lyrically, "Perfect Celebrity" explores Gaga's relationship with fame, addressing the tension between her public image and private self. The song received praise for its sound from music critics, some of whom deemed it as a standout on the album despite its "tired" subject matter.

Following the release of its parent album, "Perfect Celebrity" entered the national charts in Brazil, Canada, France, Portugal, and the United States, as well as the Billboard Global 200. In 2025–2026, Gaga performed the song live at The Art of Personal Chaos concerts, incouding her Coachella set and the Mayhem Ball tour. During these shows, she emerged from a grave-like set in a corseted white dress, surrounded by dancers wearing skull masks. She also performed stripped-down renditions of the song on The Howard Stern Show and at her one-off Mayhem Requiem concert.

== Background and release ==
Lady Gaga began writing the studio album Mayhem after her fiancé Michael Polansky convinced her to make a new pop album. Gaga noted that the song was inspired by the band the Cure and their song "Never Enough", and that she felt like the song "had been inside of me for 15 years". After having finished the song, she had briefly considered turning the entirety of Mayhem into a grunge album, before being persuaded against the idea by Polansky.

"Perfect Celebrity" was written by Lady Gaga, Andrew Watt, Henry Walter, and Mike Lévy, and produced by Gaga, Watt, and Walter. Gaga performed lead vocals and played keyboards. Watt contributed keyboards, bass, drums, electric guitar, acoustic guitar, and percussion, while Walter handled programming, keyboards, synthesizers, and drum programming. The song was engineered by Paul Lamalfa, with additional engineering by Marco Sonzini and Tyler Harris. It was mixed by Serban Ghenea, with Bryce Bordone as assistant mixing engineer, and mastered by Randy Merrill. In an interview with People, Watt said that the song came together very quickly during a studio session, explaining that he began playing a synth line minutes before Gaga arrived and that she instantly started writing upon hearing it. He described the process as "one of those really fluid things," noting that Gaga wrote the song "in one fell swoop" of about twenty minutes.

The song was originally announced as the fourth track of the album on February 18, 2025. It was subsequently previewed by Gaga on February 24, 2025, during an interview for InStyle.

== Composition ==
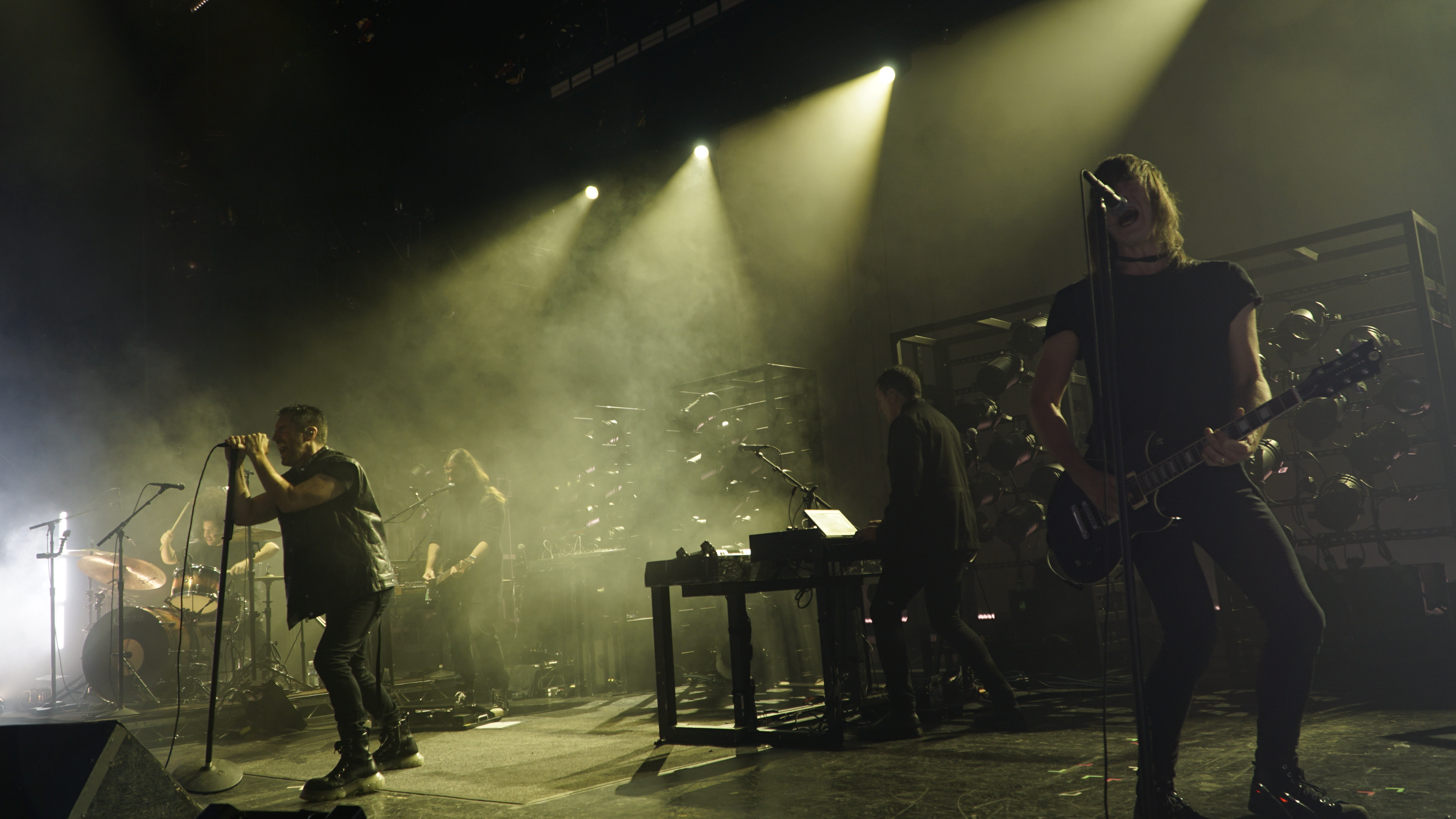
Several journalists compared the song’s composition to the music catalogue of American industrial rock band Nine Inch Nails (pictured in 2022).

"Perfect Celebrity" is an electropop, trip hop, and arena rock song, described as being "electro-grunge" by Stephen Daw of Billboard and "alt-goth" by Robert Moran of The Sydney Morning Herald. Instrumentally, the song consists of heavy synthesizers, keyboards, and an "onslaught of lashing guitars". Multiple critics have compared the song stylistically to the work of Nine Inch Nails, (Note: Attributed to Victoria Wasylak of The Boston Globe, Jaeden Pinder of Pitchfork, Brittany Spanos of Rolling Stone, Mary Siroky of Consequence, Neil Yeung of AllMusic, and Mikael Wood of the Los Angeles Times.) while Alim Kheraj of Dazed also drew parallels to Van Halen. Sheet music published by Musicnotes lists the song in D major, with the voice range spanning from C4 to F5. Gaga's vocals move from a sweeter tone into a raspy snarl, with a forceful delivery throughout the song. Ed Potton of The Times likened her vocal performance to that of Madonna.

Lyrically, "Perfect Celebrity" focuses on Gaga's relationship with fame. Speaking with Zane Lowe for Apple Music, Gaga described it as the most angry song on Mayhem, saying it expressed anger toward herself over her own desire for fame. Although she had written about fame before on songs such as "Paparazzi", Gaga said the track had "a particular venom" and reflected her unresolved anger about fame: "I don't even really know why I did this, or why I'm this angry, I just am." In an interview with Vogue, Gaga said she was nervous both to write the song and to include it on the album, describing it as anger partly directed at herself. She said her relationship with fame had changed since her early twenties, when sudden celebrity affected her sense of real life and shaped her songwriting; by the time of Mayhem, she said she valued artistry over fame and chose not to soften the song because she wanted the album to remain honest.

"Perfect Celebrity"
A 22-second sample of the song, featuring Gaga's forceful vocal delivery, heavy synthesizers and rock-influenced production. The lyrics reflect the song's themes of fame, public image, and celebrity scrutiny.

The song further examines the duality between the personal and public sides of celebrity, which Gaga identified as one of its central themes. In the Apple Music interview, Gaga described this duality as "comical", explaining that she felt divided between her true self, Stefani, and Gaga, having to determine "which body to be in". Richard Burn of Rolling Stone UK wrote that it "speaks of a star that has felt a lot of torture and pressure because of said stardom". For Kristen S. Hé of Vulture, the track moved toward "tearing down the idolatry that comes with wanting to be an artist but becoming a public figure instead".

Critics also linked "Perfect Celebrity" to Gaga's earlier treatments of fame. Alexis Petridis of The Guardian noted that the lyric "Sit in the front row, watch the princess die" functions both as a pun and as a reference to Gaga's 2009 MTV Video Music Awards performance of "Paparazzi", which she described at the time as a "performance art piece enacting the death of celebrity". Business Insider's Callie Ahlgrim similarly viewed "Perfect Celebrity" as a continuation of Gaga's satirical treatment of fame, highlighting lyrics that mock expectations of perfection and public image, and noting parallels to her "Paparazzi" performance at the VMAs. However, she described the song as more confrontational in tone, with lines such as "Rip off my face in this photograph" reading as a rejection of her own constructed persona. Dylan Kickham of Nylon identified several allusions to Gaga's other songs in the lyrics, including the Chromatica track "Plastic Doll" and the unreleased "Princess Die". CJ Thorpe-Tracey of The Quietus framed the song as exploring the conflict between a mythologized celebrity persona and the person behind it, likening fame to a form of "Faustian bargain". Thorpe-Tracey noted that such themes had already been a central focus of Gaga's work, particularly on Born This Way (2011).

== Critical reception ==
While ranking every song from Mayhem, Stephen Daw of Billboard named "Perfect Celebrity" the album's best track. He praised its "biting, electro-grunge edge" and what he called Gaga's "best rock sound to date". Mary Siroky of Consequence similarly considered it a standout on the album, while Marcus Wratten of PinkNews called the song the "nucleus" of Mayhem, praising its lyrical vividness. Brittany Spanos of Rolling Stone described the song as "sinister and heavy", and regarded it as one of the standout tracks in Gaga's catalog. Stephen Ackroyd of Dork praised the song for embodying "the kind of wry pop satire only Gaga can pull off", while Joey Nolfi of Entertainment Weekly lauded it as a "defiant middle finger to those who still think, after two decades, that they can put [Gaga] in a box". Writing for Salon, Coleman Spilde found the track one of Gaga's "most electrifying commentaries on her own fame".

Christian Allaire of Vogue described "Perfect Celebrity" as "cathartic", while Dazed's Kheraj called it "gnarly and haunted". MusicOMH's Donovan Livesey named it one of the album's "future classics". DIY's Ben Tipple considered the track part of a series of "brilliantly camp, often theatrical numbers" that pair Gaga's established legacy with a sharp, irreverent edge. Jaeden Pinder of Pitchfork wrote that "Perfect Celebrity" sounded like Gaga "expelling a demon from her soul", finding it refreshing to hear her sing "with her full chest" compared with the lighter vocal style of pop singers in the mid-2020s. Dakota West Foss of Sputnikmusic felt the song's "playful arena rock [...] helps to cancel out the bitter taste" of its critique of fame and "turn[s] a middle-finger gesture into devil horns". Karlie Rogers of Exclaim! regarded "Perfect Celebrity" an enjoyable take on celebrity and fan culture, noting that its vocal inflections recall Gaga's earlier style, and concluding that while not especially innovative, it remains entertaining.

Lindsay Zoladz of The New York Times lauded the song as a "sonic highlight" of Mayhem, yet called its subject matter "tired". Alexa Camp of Slant Magazine similarly criticized it for "lack[ing] invention", despite praising the catchiness. Gary Grimes of Attitude called the song "perfectly serviceable", while noting its subject feels "a touch recycled from previous efforts" by Gaga.

== Commercial performance ==
During the release week of Mayhem, "Perfect Celebrity" entered the Billboard Global 200 at number 67. It was one of twelve tracks from the album to appear on the chart, ranking as the seventh highest-charting track among them. In the United States, the song debuted at number 81 on the Billboard Hot 100. In Canada, it entered the Canadian Hot 100 at number 76, while in Brazil the song reached number 89 on the Brasil Hot 100 and received a double-platinum certification from Pro-Música Brasil.

"Perfect Celebrity" was unable to enter the UK Singles Chart, as chart rules prohibit a single artist from having more than three songs charting in the same week; Gaga already had "Abracadabra", "Die with a Smile", and "Garden of Eden" charted at the time. However, the song entered the UK charts for best-selling singles, most-downloaded singles, and most-streamed singles at lower positions. Elsewhere in Europe, "Perfect Celebrity" reached number 45 in Greece and charted at lower positions in Portugal and France. In New Zealand, the song debuted at number seven on the Hot 40 Singles Chart, an extension of the main chart.

== Live performances and cover version ==
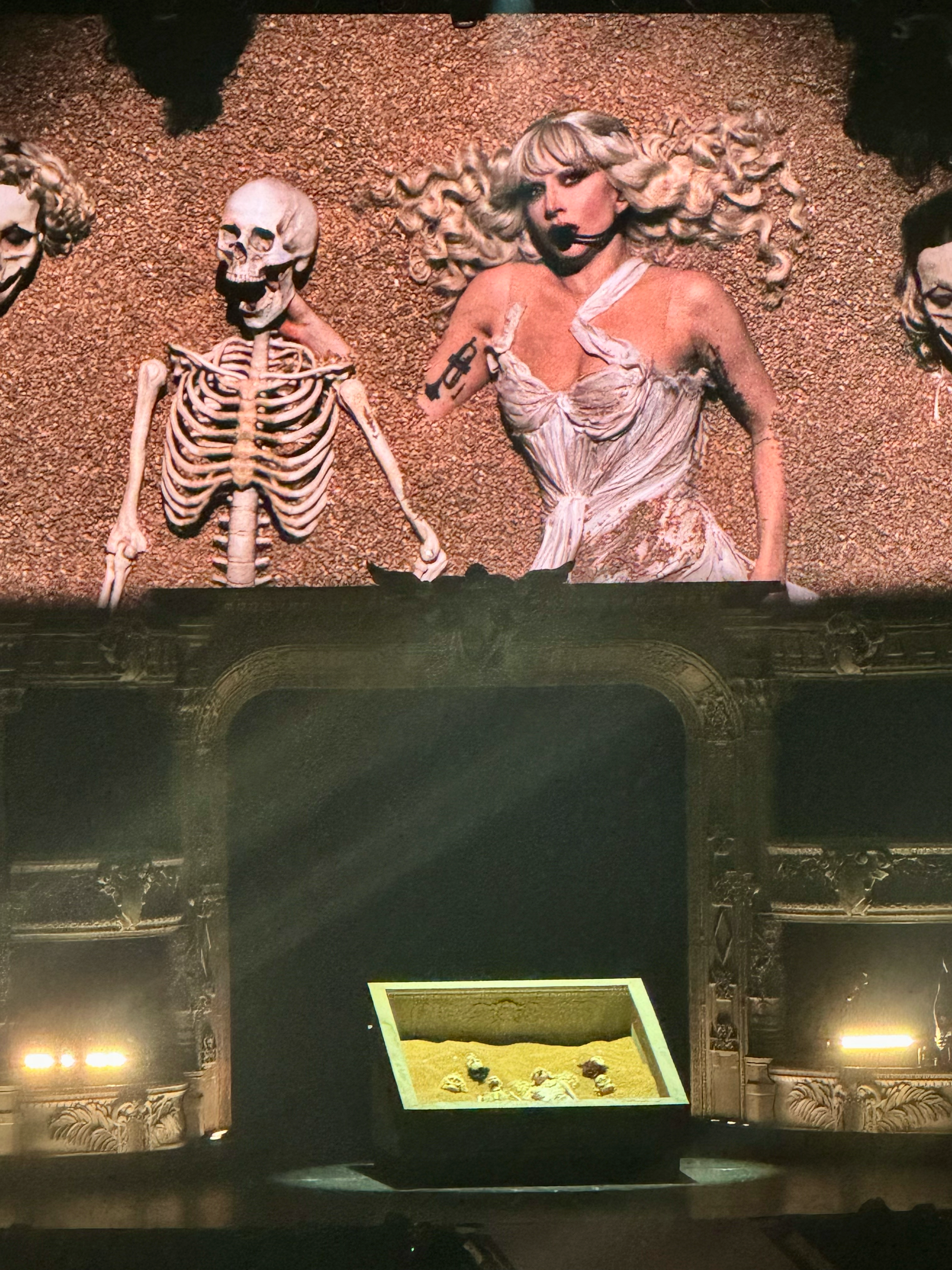
Gaga performing "Perfect Celebrity" during the Mayhem Ball tour

On March 11, 2025, Gaga performed an acoustic voice-and-guitar version of "Perfect Celebrity" live on The Howard Stern Show. Stereogum's Tom Breihan praised Gaga's vocal performance and said the song worked better in a stripped-down setting than he had expected. Later that year, Gaga included "Perfect Celebrity" in the setlist for The Art of Personal Chaos shows, which indluded promotional concerts, such as her headlining set at Coachella, as well as her seventh solo headlining tour, the Mayhem Ball (2025–2026). It was the first song of "Act II". A dance-battle scene set to "Poker Face" ended with the "Mistress of Mayhem" pushing "Light Gaga" to her death. For "Perfect Celebrity", "Light Gaga" returned in a corseted white dress, rising from a dirt-filled, grave-like sandbox surrounded by dancers in skull masks, and began the number with her arm draped around a skeleton prop. Reviewing Gaga's Coachella set for Rolling Stone, Tomás Mier interpreted the staging as a "poignant, yet clear acknowledgement that the only way stars reach perfection is once they've left us". Parris Goebel, choreographer of the concert series, revealed that she used cat litter to fill the sandbox where the performance took place.

On May 13, 2025, Gaga performed "Perfect Celebrity" during a five-song set at the YouTube Brandcast event, held at the David Geffen Hall in New York City. The song also appeared in Gaga's live album and concert film Apple Music Live: Mayhem Requiem, which was released on May 14, 2026. Recorded during an invite-only performance at the Wiltern Theatre in Los Angeles in January 2026, it was performed in a piano-led arrangement, foregrounding the song's grunge elements and adding a countermelody during the second pre-chorus.

In October 2025, American singer Demi Lovato performed a mashup of "Perfect Celebrity" and Mayhem track "Disease" on BBC Radio 1's Live Lounge, joined by a backup band.

== Credits and personnel ==
Credits are adapted from the liner notes of Mayhem.

Recording

- Recorded at Shangri-La and The Village.
- Mixed at MixStar Studios (Virginia Beach, Virginia)
- Mastered at Sterling Sound (New York City)

Personnel

- Lady Gaga – vocals, keyboards, songwriter, producer
- Andrew Watt – keyboards, bass, drums, electric guitar, percussion, acoustic guitar, songwriter, producer
- Henry Walter – programming, keyboards, synthesizer, drum programming, songwriter, producer
- Mike Lévy – songwriter
- Randy Merrill – mastering engineer
- Serban Ghenea – mixing engineer
- Bryce Bordone – assistant mixing engineer
- Paul Lamalfa – engineer
- Marco Sonzini – additional engineer
- Tyler Harris – additional engineer

== Charts ==
Chart (2025)	Peak position
Brazil Hot 100 (Billboard)	89
Canada Hot 100 (Billboard)	76
France (SNEP)	126
Global 200 (Billboard)	67
Greece International (IFPI)	45
New Zealand Hot Singles (RMNZ)	7
Portugal (AFP)	93
UK Singles Downloads (Official Charts)	89
UK Singles Sales (OCC)	94
UK Streaming (OCC)	65
US Billboard Hot 100	81

== Certifications ==
Certifications
Region	Certification	Certified units/sales
Brazil (Pro-Música Brasil)	2× Platinum	80,000^{‡}
^{‡} Sales+streaming figures based on certification alone.
