= Apple Music Live: Mayhem Requiem =

2026 live album by Lady Gaga

Live album by Lady Gaga
- Released: May 14, 2026
- Recorded: January 14, 2026
- Venue: Wiltern Theatre (Los Angeles)
- Length: 66:58
- Label: Interscope
- Producers: Lady Gaga; Johnny Natural; Tim Stewart; Brockett Parsons; Kris Pooley

Lady Gaga chronology
Mayhem (2025)	Apple Music Live: Mayhem Requiem (2026)

Apple Music Live: Mayhem Requiem is a concert film and live album by American singer and songwriter Lady Gaga. It was released on May 14, 2026, through Interscope Records, as part of the promotion for her sixth solo studio album Mayhem (2025). It was recorded during a one-night-only concert held at the Wiltern Theatre in Los Angeles, United States, on January 14, 2026. Produced in collaboration with Apple Music, the project was teased during the final show of the Mayhem Ball tour at Madison Square Garden on April 13, 2026.

During the show, Gaga performed the full track list of Mayhem's standard edition in order, presenting a darker and more stripped-back interpretation of the album. Conceived as an encore to the Mayhem Ball, the concert used a destroyed version of the tour's opera-house set. Gaga said the concept reflected the idea of rebuilding from life's "broken pieces" while musically reimagining Mayhem. The project received particular praise from critics for its stripped-down presentation, Gaga's creative approach, and the album's reworked arrangements. Commercially, the live album reached number two in album downloads in the United Kingdom and also charted in Australia, Belgium, France, Japan, and Switzerland.

== Background and development ==
On March 7, 2025, Lady Gaga released Mayhem, her sixth solo studio album, through Interscope and Streamline Records. She wrote and produced the album alongside Andrew Watt, Cirkut and Gesaffelstein, among others. Mayhem was characterized by a mix of synth-pop, industrial dance, electro, disco, funk and rock influences, and explored themes of love, chaos, fame, identity and desire. It received critical acclaim, with reviewers praising its production, stylistic diversity and cohesive concept. It was commercially successful, topping the charts in several countries, (Note: Attributed to multiple sources:) and ranking as the ninth best-selling album globally of 2025. To support the album, Gaga staged several promotional concerts and embarked on the Mayhem Ball, her eighth concert tour; the combined shows grossed $419.5 million, placing the overall concert run among the ten highest-grossing concert tours by a female artist in history.

On January 14, 2026, between the tour's stadium dates in Australia and Japan, Gaga held Mayhem Requiem, a private performance organized with Apple Music at the Wiltern Theatre in Los Angeles, a venue with an approximate capacity of 2,300 people. Separate from the larger-scale Mayhem Ball tour, the concert was conceived as a one-night-only, intimate event for a limited audience. Tickets were made available through a lottery for fans who had signed up for Gaga's updates, rather than through regular ticketing platforms. They were priced between $225 and $450, and the event sold out. Attendees were required to place recording devices in locked pouches at the venue, while Apple Music recorded the performance for its Apple Music Live series.

== Production ==
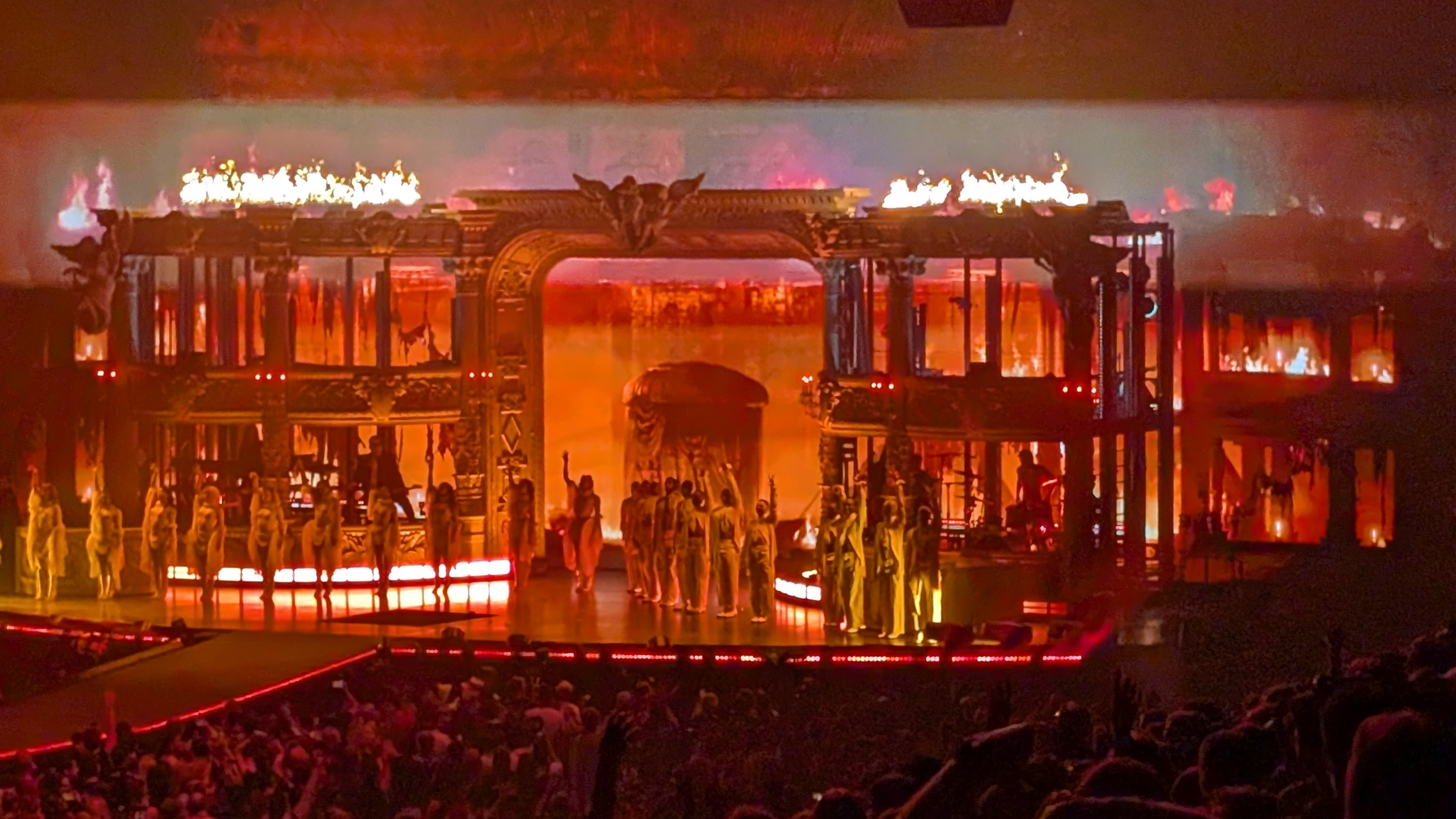
The Mayhem Ball featured an opera-house set that appeared to burn during the finale (pictured). Mayhem Requiem later presented the same setting in ruins.

Mayhem Requiem was billed as the culmination of Gaga's Mayhem era. It served as an encore to The Mayhem Ball, with the tour's opera-house set presented as if reduced to rubble, with crumbled stone, shattered stained glass and pipe organs rising from the debris, as Gaga performed among cracked columns and scattered ruins. Gaga said the concept came from imagining the opera-house setting of the album's visual world as having fallen apart, allowing the album to be torn down, reconstructed and musically reimagined. She linked the idea to the album's themes, saying it reflected taking "the broken pieces" of life and putting them back together. According to Apple Music's release notes, she appears as "the phantom of her own gothic opera". The staging remained largely static, with lasers, smoke, neon lighting and shifting colors used as the main visual effects.

Gaga produced all of the songs and the opening interlude, with Johnny Natural, Tim Stewart, Brockett Parsons and Kris Pooley also credited as producers across the album's tracks and interludes. In an Instagram post, Gaga said she built Mayhem Requiem around influences from musicians and artists she had admired throughout her career, naming Kavinsky as a major influence on several albums. Discussing "Die with a Smile", she said she wanted to bring "French electronic energy" and a "relentless arpeggio" to the song, creating a dystopian contrast with its original melody and themes of love and hope. On the performance, she added:

I tried to perform how it would feel to me to say goodbye to my record, my loved one, or my fans if the world around me was changing.

The concert film was directed and produced by Morningview, while Gaga and Michael Polansky served as executive producers. The show's costumes, curated by stylist Sandra Amador, incorporated designs by Iris van Herpen, Robert Wun, Elsa Schiaparelli, Maison Margiela, and further 1990s archival Givenchy pieces by Alexander McQueen.

== Release ==
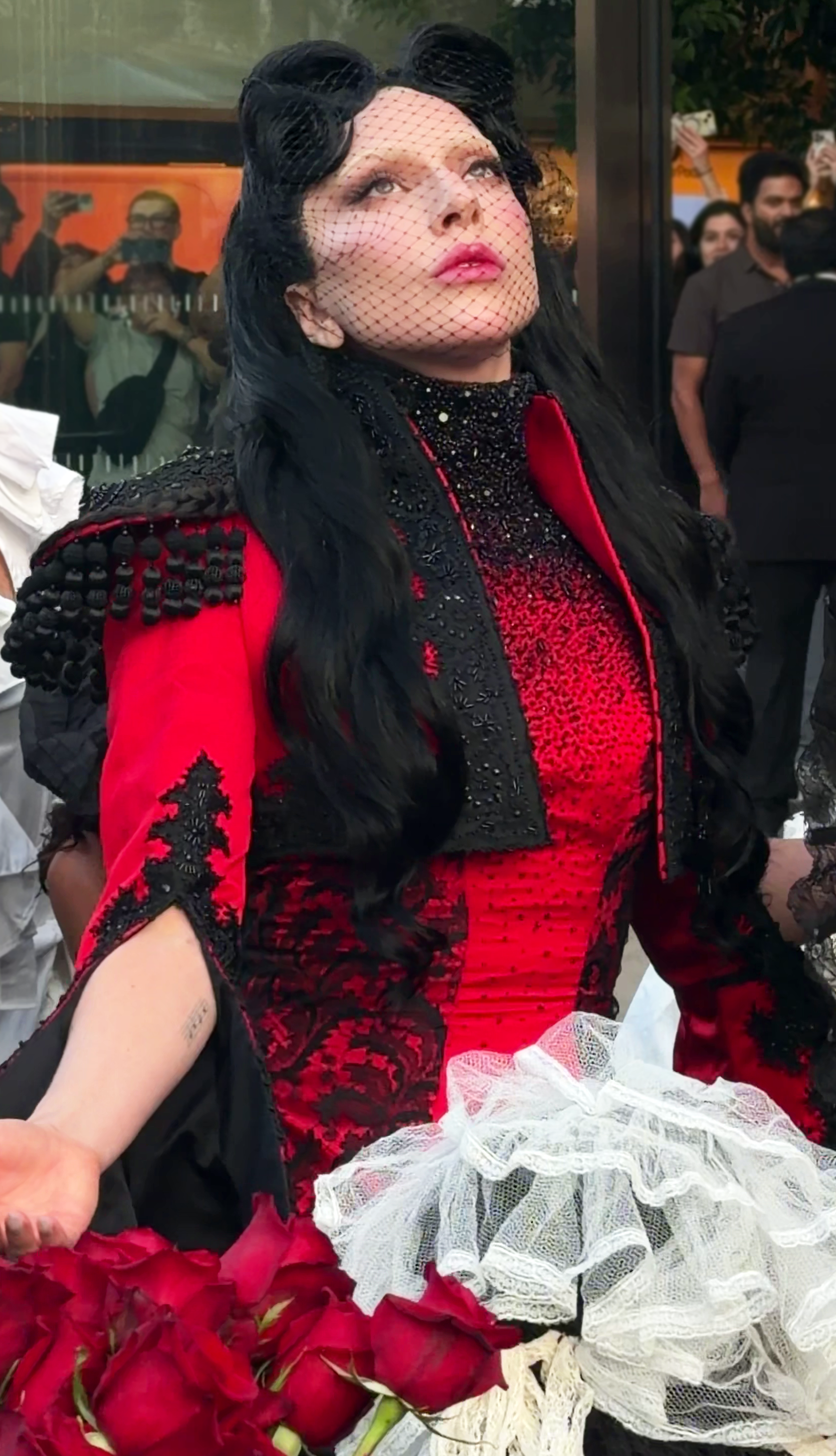
Gaga during the Mayhem Requiem premiere at The Grove, Los Angeles

On April 13, 2026, at the final show of the Mayhem Ball at Madison Square Garden in New York City, Gaga teased the upcoming concert film Mayhem Requiem. A trailer for the project premiered on May 12, 2026, alongside Gaga's performance of "Shadow of a Man". The film debuted globally on Apple Music and Apple TV on May 14, 2026, with simultaneous one-night screenings at fifteen AMC Theaters across the United States. The premiere was available to watch on Apple Music without a subscription. The platform also released a 15-minute video featuring behind-the-scenes footage of the concert's production.

To promote the release, Gaga appeared at The Grove in Los Angeles on the day of the film's debut, leading a funeral-style procession from the Apple Store to the AMC theater hosting one of the screenings. The procession featured a New Orleans-style marching band playing songs from Mayhem, alongside 40 performers dressed in the red, black and white palette associated with the Mayhem era. The performers threw roses and petals before forming a tableau vivant outside the theater, where they remained as a photo backdrop for fans after Gaga's departure. Gaga wore an archival red-and-black Givenchy haute couture dress from Alexander McQueen's Fall/Winter 1997–98 collection, which Vogue Adria linked to the funeral-procession theme of the event. At the screening, attendees received a Mayhem-inspired zine designed by Apple Music senior art director Rose Zhang, who said its art direction followed the Gothic tone of Gaga's stage design and was inspired by Gaga's idea of the tour's set being discovered centuries after the final show. Zhang also designed the album's cover artwork. Shazam users could also unlock special content related to the project, including themed wallpapers and Apple Watch faces. Additional cinema screenings were held in Brazil, the only country outside the United States to show the film theatrically. The special screened on May 25, 2026, with free tickets made available through Vivo's app to customers with an active Apple Music subscription.

== Synopsis ==
For the show, Gaga performs all songs from Mayhem's standard edition in sequence, (Note: The bonus track "Can't Stop the High" served as the concert's encore, but was not included in the concert film or live album.) presenting a "rawer, moodier" version of the album. The concert opens with the epigraph "Stranger, Remember Me" before Gaga emerging dressed in black, wearing a chain-mail veil. She begins the main sequence with "Disease", with an arrangement remaining relatively close to the studio version, followed by a darker techno-pop reinterpretation of "Abracadabra", which Gaga starts at the piano before a sharper beat enters after the first chorus. "Garden of Eden" features more prominent guitarplay in the mix. "Perfect Celebrity" is performed in a piano-led arrangement that emphasizes the song's grunge elements and includes a countermelody during the second pre-chorus. For "Vanish into You", Gaga uses an arrangement between the song's standard version and a more stripped-back rendition, while crawling around the stage.

After an interlude, Gaga returns with a new veil that exposes her white-blonde hair. "Killah" is presented in a heavier industrial arrangement, incorporating portions of Nine Inch Nails' "Closer" (1994). "Zombieboy" is reworked with a more prominent synthesizer-driven arrangement and a synthwave style, while "LoveDrug" incorporates electronica elements and vocodered vocals. After another interlude, Gaga returns with a new headpiece for "How Bad Do U Want Me", which began with a synth-driven arrangement before shifting into a rock-oriented version. "Don't Call Tonight" stays close to the album version, followed by "Shadow of a Man".

After the fourth interlude, Gaga sings "The Beast" from the remains of the balcony in a piano-heavy arrangement, laying on the floor for a large portion of the performance. "Blade of Grass" follows after another interlude, expanding on the piano-based versions Gaga previously performed with a fuller arrangement. For the finale, Gaga reappears in a cyberpunk-inspired armor-like outfit with a helmet and ruffled skirt. She performs "Die with a Smile", which is substantially reworked around elements of Kavinsky's "Nightcall" (2010) and includes processed vocals. The version alters the song's arrangement, tempo and instrumentation, moving it toward an electro-funk sound and making it one of the concert's largest departures from the studio recording.

== Critical reception ==
Steven J. Horowitz of Variety described Mayhem Requiem as "the other side of the Mayhem Ball coin", noting that it removed the tour's arena-scale spectacle in favor of a more static, music-centered performance. He compared its stripped-down approach to Lady Gaga in Harlequin Live: One Night Only and her Jazz & Piano residency in Las Vegas, and wrote that the concert brought Gaga's larger artistic ambitions back to the music, where she "thrives as a showwoman". Horowitz concluded that the special centered on the "malleability of her songwriting" and served as a testament to her creative power. Tony Bravo of the San Francisco Chronicle described both the concert film and live album as imaginative reinventions of the Mayhem material, saying the project would appeal to live-music audiences and viewers nostalgic for MTV Unplugged-style performances and HBO concert specials. He described the costumes as a "masterclass" in dark glamour that avoided resembling a Tim Burton film character.

Taylor Lomax of Paper said the piano-led version of "Abracadabra" reflected what he saw as a broader theme of the Mayhem era: Gaga's strength as a vocalist and musician. He also singled out "Killah" for its industrial reworking and "Die with a Smile" for its vocoder-heavy reinvention. Emma Madden of Highsnobiety remarked that it is rare to see "a pop star of this magnitude scaled down like this", noting the absence of dancers and the use of only a small group of musicians. She described the slightly gated sound as "imperfect in a way that felt human and charming", and compared the show's mechanical, industrious and self-contained quality to a Broadway production.

== Commercial performance ==
In the United States, Mayhem Requiem debuted at number 12 on the Top Dance Albums chart for the week of May 30, 2026, marking Gaga's tenth entry on the chart. In the United Kingdom, it debuted at number 2 on the UK Album Downloads Chart and at number 50 on the UK Albums Sales Chart for the week of May 28, 2026. Elsewhere in Europe, the live album reached number 42 in Switzerland, number 172 in France, and in Belgium, number 186 in Flanders and number 142 in Wallonia. In Australia, it debuted at number 65 on the ARIA Albums Chart. In Japan, it debuted at number 62 on Billboard Japan's Download Albums Chart for the week of May 20, 2026, after six days of availability.

== Track listing ==
Apple Music Live: Mayhem Requiem
No.	Title	Writer(s)	Length
1.	"Intro"	Lady Gaga; Kris Pooley	0:50
2.	"Disease"	Gaga; Andrew Watt; Henry Walter; Michael Polansky	3:51
3.	"Abracadabra"	Gaga; Watt; Walter; Susan Janet Ballion; Peter Edward Clarke; Steven Severin; John McGeoch	4:04
4.	"Garden of Eden"	Gaga; Watt; Walter; Mike Lévy	4:42
5.	"Perfect Celebrity"	Gaga; Watt; Walter; Lévy	3:37
6.	"Vanish into You"	Gaga; Watt; Walter; Polansky	4:33
7.	"Interlude I"	Brockett Parsons	1:13
8.	"Killah"	Gaga; Watt; Walter; Lévy; Trent Reznor	3:38
9.	"Zombieboy"	Gaga; Watt; Walter; James Fauntleroy	3:40
10.	"Interlude II"	Parsons	0:37
11.	"LoveDrug"	Gaga; Watt; Walter; Polansky	3:31
12.	"Interlude III"	Parsons	1:51
13.	"How Bad Do U Want Me"	Gaga; Polansky; Watt; Walter	4:38
14.	"Don't Call Tonight"	Gaga; Watt; Walter; Polansky	3:51
15.	"Shadow of a Man"	Gaga; Watt; Walter	3:36
16.	"Interlude IV"	Parsons	0:34
17.	"The Beast"	Gaga; Watt; Walter; Polansky	4:09
18.	"Interlude V"	Parsons	2:03
19.	"Blade of Grass"	Gaga; Watt; Lévy; Polansky	4:16
20.	"Interlude VI"	Parsons	1:36
21.	"Die with a Smile"	Gaga; Bruno Mars; Dernst Emile II; Fauntleroy; Watt; Guy-Manuel de Homem-Christo; Vincent Belorgey	6:08
Total length:			66:58

=== Notes ===
- The release also includes video performances of each song and interlude.
- "Killah" contains elements of "Closer" performed by Nine Inch Nails, adding Trent Reznor to the songwriting credits.
- "Die with a Smile" contains elements of "Nightcall" performed by Kavinsky featuring Lovefoxxx, adding Guy-Manuel de Homem-Christo and Vincent Belorgey to the songwriting credits.

== Personnel ==
Credits were adapted from Apple Music.

=== Musicians ===
- Lady Gaga – lead vocals (tracks 2–6, 8, 9, 11, 13–15, 17, 19 and 21), synthesizer (2, 8, 9 and 21), piano (3, 5, 6, 11 and 19), Moog (3 and 17), electric guitar (4)
- Bruno Mars – lead vocals (21)
- Kris Pooley – synthesizer (1), programming (15)
- Johnny Natural – programming (2–5, 7–14 and 16–21)
- Brockett Parsons – keyboards (2–6, 8, 9, 11, 13–15, 17, 19 and 21), synthesizer (2–21), piano (12, 16 and 18)
- Tosh Peterson – drums (2–6, 8, 9, 11, 13–15, 17, 19 and 21)
- Eric Ingram – bass (2–6, 8, 9, 11, 14, 15 and 21), synth bass (2–5, 8, 9, 13, 17 and 19)
- Tim Stewart – electric guitar (2–4, 6, 8, 9, 14 and 15), acoustic guitar (11, 13, 17 and 19), guitar (21), programming (8)
- Ricky Tillo – electric guitar (2–4, 6, 8, 9 and 13), acoustic guitar (3, 11, 14, 15 and 17), guitar (19 and 21), synthesizer (3, 8, 13 and 21)

=== Technical ===
- Lady Gaga – production (1–6, 8, 9, 11, 13–15, 17, 19 and 21)
- Johnny Natural – production (2–8, 10–14 and 16–21), engineering (all tracks)
- Brockett Parsons – production (7, 10, 12, 16, 18 and 20)
- Kris Pooley – sound design (1), production (9 and 15)
- Tim Stewart – production (6, 8 and 15)
- Andre Bowman – engineering (all tracks)
- Bill Malina – mix engineering, immersive mix engineering (all tracks)

== Charts ==
Chart performance for Apple Music Live: Mayhem Requiem
Chart (2026)	Peak position
Australian Albums (ARIA)	65
Belgian Albums (Ultratop Flanders)	186
Belgian Albums (Ultratop Wallonia)	142
French Albums (SNEP)	172
Japanese Download Albums (Billboard Japan)	62
Swiss Albums (Schweizer Hitparade)	42
UK Album Downloads (Official Charts)	2
UK Albums Sales (OCC)	50
US Top Dance Albums (Billboard)	12

== Release history ==
Release history for Apple Music Live: Mayhem Requiem
Region	Date	Format(s)	Label	Ref.
Various	May 14, 2026	Digital download; streaming	Interscope	
