= Garden of Eden (Lady Gaga song) =

Song by Lady Gaga

from the album Mayhem
- Released: March 7, 2025
- Studio: Shangri-La (Malibu)
- Genre: Electro; electroclash; synth-pop; dance-pop
- Length: 3:59
- Label: Interscope
- Songwriters: Lady Gaga; Andrew Watt; Henry Walter; Mike Lévy
- Producers: Lady Gaga; Gesaffelstein; Andrew Watt; Cirkut

Audio video
- "Garden of Eden" on YouTube

"Garden of Eden" is a song by American singer-songwriter Lady Gaga. It was released on March 7, 2025, through Interscope Records, as the third track from Gaga's studio album, Mayhem (2025). It was written and produced jointly by Gaga, Andrew Watt, Cirkut, and Gesaffelstein. "Garden of Eden" is an electro, electroclash, synth-pop, and dance-pop track whose lyrics describe a one-night adventure at a rave, using the Garden of Eden as a reference to paradise.

The song received generally positive reviews from critics, who singled it out as one of the strongest tracks on Mayhem and praised its production while also noting influences from her earlier works. Commercially, it charted in several countries following the release of its parent album, including Australia, Brazil, Canada, France, Ireland, Japan, the United Kingdom, and the United States, as well as on the Billboard Global 200.

Gaga performed "Garden of Eden" live at several events, including her 2025 promotional concerts and The Mayhem Ball tour (2025–2026). During these shows, she appeared in a black outfit and played electric guitar, with the stage illuminated in green lighting. Gaga also performed a reimagined version of the song for Mayhem Requiem.

== Background and release ==
In March 2024, Lady Gaga stated that she was writing "some of the best songs she could remember" and revealed that work on her upcoming album had begun in 2022 while she was on her Chromatica Ball tour (2022). Following the announcement of her studio album Mayhem (2025), Gaga revealed the song title as part of the tracklist on February 18, 2025. Lyrics from the song circulated a day earlier on her official website in a string of cryptic teasers. On March 5, she previewed the song through an ESPN commercial that features the song over clips and montages of Formula One racing.

== Composition ==
"Garden of Eden" was written and produced by Gaga, Andrew Watt, Cirkut, and Gesaffelstein. Gaga performed lead vocals and played synthesizers, while Watt contributed bass, drums, guitars, percussion, and synthesizers. Cirkut handled drums, programming, synthesizers, and keyboards, and Gesaffelstein provided programming. It was recorded at Shangri-La in Malibu, California, by Paul Lamalfa, with additional engineering by Marco Sonzini. Tommy Turner and Tyler Harris served as assistant recording engineers. The song was mixed by Serban Ghenea at Mixstar Studios in Virginia Beach, Virginia, with Bryce Bordone as assistant mixing engineer, and mastered by Randy Merrill at Sterling Sound Studios in Edgewater, New Jersey.

"Garden of Eden"
A 24-second sample of the song's chorus, featuring electronic beats, and lyrics about a one-night adventure in a rave-like setting.

"Garden of Eden" is an electro, electroclash, synth-pop, and dance-pop track, which incorporates sharp, rock-infused guitar riffs, a chuffing beat, and squelching synths throughout the arrangement. It showcases influences from some of Gaga's earlier works, including The Fame (2008), The Fame Monster (2009), Born This Way (2011) and Artpop (2013). Some journalists suggested that Gaga's unreleased track "Private Audition", which predates The Fame, was reworked into "Garden of Eden". Billboard's Stephen Daw described the track as an "eclectic" club song that incorporates elements from Gaga's expansive career while leaning into 2000s pop influences. Nick Levine of NME found the song's stuttering vocal hook reminiscent of "Poker Face", while Los Angeles Times contributor Mikael Wood felt the "whoa-oh-oh" motif is borrowed from "Bad Romance" (2009). Consequence's Mary Siroky found traces of Artpop tracks "Swine" and "Manicure" in the song's "devil-may-care energy". Adam White of The Independent described it as an example of Mayhem's eclectic pop aesthetic, pivoting from a mid-2000s Nelly Furtado–style delivery to a serene chorus reminiscent of Born This Way, and then into surf-pop in the style of the B-52s. AllMusic's Neil Z. Yeung noted that "Garden of Eden" blends early-2010s electroclash influences with a bright, melodic chorus, drawing comparisons to the style of Christina Aguilera's Bionic (2010).

Lyrically, the song depicts a hedonistic one-night encounter set in a rave-like environment. According to Walden Green of Pitchfork, the lyrics draw heavily on biblical imagery, reimagining the Garden of Eden as a contemporary dancefloor. Writing for The i, Emily Bootle described the song as portraying a bacchanalian party in which Gaga depicts herself "falling over in my nine-inch heels" while seeking fleeting romantic connections. Consequence's Siroky wrote that the song finds Gaga reaching back to a simpler moment — one that embraces the effortless clarity of a "girlfriend for the weekend, boyfriend for the night" kind of arrangement.

== Critical reception ==
Upon release, "Garden of Eden" received mostly positive reviews from music critics with many declaring the song a standout. In a ranking of all songs on the album for Billboard, Stephen Daw placed it second, calling the track an "A+ pop gem" as well as a conglomeration of "all the sounds that have helped make Gaga the icon that she is". Alexis Petridis of The Guardian viewed the song as an example of "the fleeting clubland hook-up as balm for the soul". Vogue editor Christian Allaire called "Garden of Eden", along with "Zombieboy", the album's two "sexy pop bangers certain to be hits in all the gay clubs". Similarly, Stephen Ackroyd of Dork felt that these two track form "a pair of gloriously camp club ragers destined to become late-night anthems for the creatures of the night." Variety's Steven J. Horowitz called it a "snapping sweet treat", suggesting it fulfills the promise of high-impact, low-stakes art first hinted at in "Abracadabra", the last single issued before the album's release.

Ludovic Hunter-Tilney of the Financial Times opined that "Garden of Eden" features Gaga attempting, in an eccentric yet brilliant way, "to reverse the fall of mankind with a paradisiacal hook-up on the dancefloor." In a review for Pitchfork, Walden Green praised the track on which "Gaga invokes MDMA, nine-inch stilettos, and some good old-fashioned blasphemy, envisioning the site of original sin as a warehouse rave with God in the DJ booth." Kristen S. Hé of Vulture called the song "pure musical hedonism" and complimented its production, particularly the contrast between the verses and Europop chorus, the pitch-shifted guitars and the call-and-response vocals. Beats Per Minute's JT Early called it a "wonder", praising its production, while The New York Times's Lindsay Zoladz described it as "skronky, gloriously hedonistic".

Alexa Camp at Slant Magazine thought the track was "an attempt to revive the messy party-girl shtick" hailing from The Fame with a "shamelessness of someone half her age". Gary Grimes of Attitude remarked that listeners anticipating a harsh, industrial sound from the collaboration with Gesaffelstein might be let down. Instead, he likened the track to songs from The Fame such as "Disco Heaven" and "Beautiful, Dirty, Rich", as well as some of her pre-The Fame material.

Ed Power of The Irish Times was critical of "Garden of Eden", describing it as reminiscent of "a random Spice Girl fronting The Prodigy" — albeit poorly — and criticized its lyrics as clichéd to the point of parody, citing lines such as "DJ hit the lights … I could be your girlfriend for the weekend." Megan Lapierre of Exclaim! found it a less impressive version of "Abracadabra".

== Commercial performance ==
During the release week of Mayhem, "Garden of Eden" entered the Billboard Global 200 at number 31. It was one of twelve tracks from the album to appear on the chart, ranking as the third highest-charting track among them. In the United States, the song debuted at number 52 on the Billboard Hot 100 and at number three on the Hot Dance/Pop Songs chart. On the latter chart, Gaga simultaneously placed nine songs from the album, with "Garden of Eden" ranking as the second highest-positioned track. In Canada, it entered the Canadian Hot 100 at number 43, while in Brazil it reached number 47 on the Brasil Hot 100 and received a diamond certification from Pro-Música Brasil.

In the United Kingdom, "Garden of Eden" debuted at number 23 on the UK Singles Chart, marking her 32nd song to enter the top 40 of the chart. Across Europe, the song peaked at number 17 in Greece and reached the top 40 in Ireland and Finland, while also charting in Switzerland (43), Poland (51), Portugal (51), Slovakia (65), the Netherlands (75), the Czech Republic (77), France (82), Spain (84), Germany (92), Sweden (92), and Italy (97).

Elsewhere, "Garden of Eden" charted in Australia, where it peaked at number 77 on the ARIA Singles Chart, and reached number four on New Zealand's Hot Singles chart. In Asia, the song peaked at number 11 on Billboard Japan's Hot Overseas chart and entered the charts in Singapore, where it reached number 16.

== Live performances ==
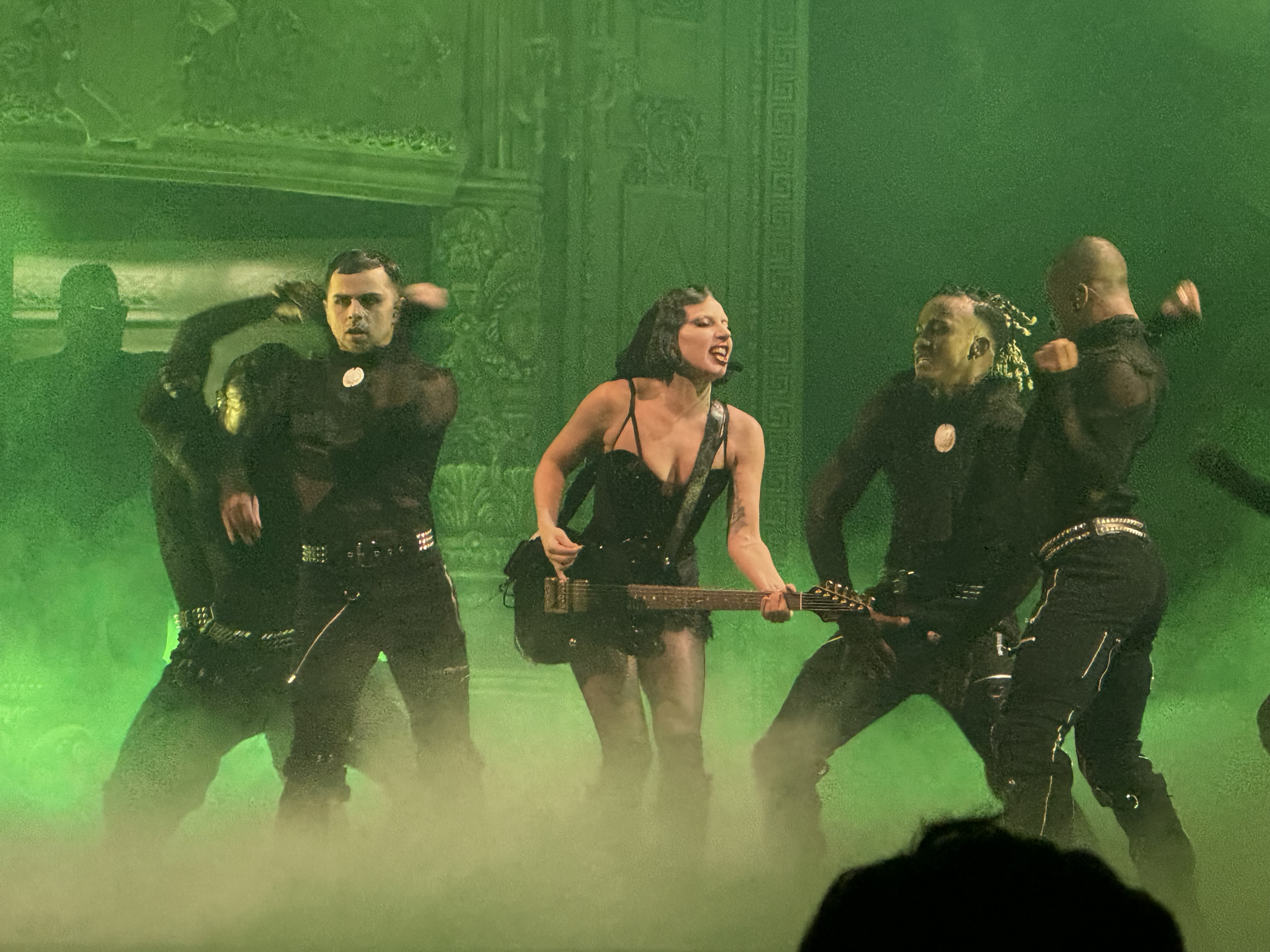
Gaga performing "Garden of Eden" during the Mayhem Ball tour

Gaga included "Garden of Eden" in the set list of her 2025 promotional concerts for Mayhem, as well as her seventh solo headlining tour, the Mayhem Ball (2025–2026). During these performances, the stage turned green for the song as Gaga played on electric guitar, moving with her dancers toward the tip of the catwalk near the end of the track. Gaga, matching her dancers, took the stage in an all-black ensemble that featured a short, gothic-styled hairstyle, a veil reminiscent of mourning attire, tall leather boots, and translucent lingerie pieces. Robin Murray of Clash found the "epic, wildly over-the-top" performance one of the highlights. Poppy Burton of NME noted the track was "given an operatic revamp". Chris Willman of Variety's remarked that for "Garden of Eden" Gaga and her dancers "engaged in a funkier style of movement than at other times, and it was delightful."

A reimagined version of "Garden of Eden" appeared in Gaga's live album and concert film Apple Music Live: Mayhem Requiem, which was released on May 14, 2026, and recorded during an invite-only performance at the Wiltern Theatre in Los Angeles in January 2026.

== Credits and personnel ==
Credits are adapted from the liner notes of Mayhem.

Recording

- Recorded at Shangri-La.
- Mixed at MixStar Studios (Virginia Beach, Virginia)
- Mastered at Sterling Sound (New York City)

Personnel

- Lady Gaga – vocals, songwriting, production, synthesizers
- Andrew Watt – songwriting, production, bass, drums, guitars, percussion, synthesizers
- Gesaffelstein – songwriting, production, programming
- Cirkut – songwriting, production, drums, programming, synthesizers, keyboards
- Randy Merrill – mastering engineer
- Serban Ghenea – mixing engineer
- Bryce Bordone – assistant mixing engineer
- Paul Lamalfa – recording engineer
- Marco Sonzini – additional engineer
- Tommy Turner – assistant recording engineer
- Tyler Harris – assistant recording engineer

== Charts ==
=== Weekly charts ===
Chart (2025)	Peak position
Australia (ARIA)	77
Brazil Hot 100 (Billboard)	47
Bolivia Anglo Airplay (Monitor Latino)	5
Canada Hot 100 (Billboard)	43
Croatia International Airplay (Top lista)	68
Czech Republic Singles Digital (ČNS IFPI)	77
Finland (Suomen virallinen lista)	36
France (SNEP)	82
Germany (GfK)	92
Global 200 (Billboard)	31
Greece International (IFPI)	17
Ireland (IRMA)	31
Italy (FIMI)	97
Japan Hot Overseas (Billboard Japan)	11
Latvia Airplay (LaIPA)	11
Lebanon English Airplay (Lebanese Top 20)	14
Lithuania (AGATA)	60
Lithuania Airplay (TopHit)	43
Netherlands (Single Top 100)	75
New Zealand Hot Singles (RMNZ)	4
Nicaragua Anglo Airplay (Monitor Latino)	7
Poland (Polish Streaming Top 100)	51
Portugal (AFP)	51
Singapore (RIAS)	16
Slovakia Singles Digital (ČNS IFPI)	65
South Korea Download (Circle)	179
Spain (PROMUSICAE)	84
Sweden (Sverigetopplistan)	92
Switzerland (Schweizer Hitparade)	43
UK Singles (Official Charts)	23
Uruguay Anglo Airplay (Monitor Latino)	8
US Billboard Hot 100	52
US Hot Dance/Pop Songs (Billboard)	3

=== Monthly charts ===
Chart (2025)	Peak position
Lithuania Airplay (TopHit)	82

=== Year-end charts ===
Chart (2025)	Position
US Hot Dance/Pop Songs (Billboard)	21

== Certifications ==
Certifications
Region	Certification	Certified units/sales
Brazil (Pro-Música Brasil)	Diamond	160,000^{‡}
^{‡} Sales+streaming figures based on certification alone.
