= Disease (Lady Gaga song) =

2024 single by Lady Gaga

Single by Lady Gaga

from the album Mayhem
- Released: October 25, 2024
- Studio: Shangri-La (Malibu)
- Genre: Electropop; dark pop; dance-pop; synth-pop; industrial dance; industrial pop; EDM
- Length: 3:49
- Label: Interscope
- Songwriters: Lady Gaga; Andrew Watt; Henry Walter; Michael Polansky
- Producers: Lady Gaga; Andrew Watt; Cirkut

Lady Gaga singles chronology
"Die with a Smile" (2024)	"Disease" (2024)	"Abracadabra" (2025)

Music video
- "Disease" on YouTube

"Disease" is a song by American singer and songwriter Lady Gaga. It was released as the lead single from her sixth solo studio album, Mayhem, on October 25, 2024, by Interscope Records. She wrote and produced the track with Andrew Watt and Cirkut, while Michael Polansky provided additional songwriting. "Disease" is an electropop, dark pop, dance-pop, synth-pop, industrial dance, industrial pop, and EDM song with grungy guitars and four-on-the-floor beats. The lyrics explore how love can cure a partner's affliction. "Disease" received acclaim from critics, who praised its production and Gaga's vocal performance. It received a nomination for Best Pop Solo Performance at the 2026 Grammy Awards.

The track peaked at number 14 on the Billboard Global 200 and reached the top 20 in the Czech Republic, Greece, Ireland, Latvia, Slovakia, and the United Kingdom. It was certified double platinum in Brazil and platinum in Canada. The music video for "Disease", directed by Tanu Muiño, depicts Gaga facing different versions of herself and trying to control her personified fears. Gaga first performed the track during a Christmas special of Carpool Karaoke in December 2024. She later included it in the set list of The Art of Personal Chaos concerts, including the Mayhem Ball concert tour (2025–2026). Gaga also performed a reimagined version of the song for Mayhem Requiem.

== Background and production ==
Lady Gaga revealed that she was working on new music on March 28, 2024, stating, "I am writing some of my best music in as long as I can remember". Cirkut was invited to work with Gaga through Andrew Watt; the three produced the song "Disease", which was conceived "fairly early in the process" of their creative collaboration and became a "cornerstone" of their work for her then-upcoming studio album. Cirkut characterized it as a "very aggressive" track and an "in-your-face" introduction to the project. Gaga stated that both the song and its music video were inspired by her confrontation with her fears and "inner darkness": "No matter how scary the question, the answers are inside of me. Essential, inextricable parts of what makes me me. I save myself by keeping going". In later interviews, she further described "Disease" as being about "somebody that wants to harm you — and it being you", and said that she chose it as the album's lead single because it had a "strong sound".

Gaga wrote the track with Watt, Cirkut, and Michael Polansky. Paul Lamalfa recorded it at Shangri-La Studios in Malibu, California; Marco Sonzini provided additional engineering, while Tyler Harris worked as the assistant engineer. "Disease" was mixed by Serban Ghenea at Mixstar Studios in Virginia Beach, Virginia, and mastered by Randy Merrill at Sterling Sound Studios in Edgewater, New Jersey. Gaga additionally played synthesizer; Watt played synthesizer, drums, bass guitar, electric guitar, and percussion; and Cirkut played synthesizer and keyboards and provided drum and bass programming. Bryce Bordone worked as the assistant mixing engineer, and Marc VanGool served as the studio technician.

== Release ==
Following the release of "Die with a Smile" on August 16, 2024, and while attending the 81st Venice International Film Festival ahead of the premiere of her film Joker: Folie à Deux (2024), Gaga announced that the lead single from her then-upcoming studio album was to be released in October 2024. On October 18, Spotify updated the titles of seven tracks from her discography to spell out the word "disease", hinting at an upcoming single. Three days later, the song's release was confirmed by Universal Music Group through a pre-save website, which depicted a glitch of the phrase "I could play the doctor" against a black screen. Via her social media, Gaga revealed the official logo of "Disease", a promotional poster, and the release time for cities globally. On October 25, Interscope Records released "Disease" worldwide digitally for download and streaming, and Universal sent it to Italian radio airplay. Four days later, Interscope released it in the United States to contemporary hit radio. Gaga unveiled the track listing of her studio album Mayhem on February 18, 2025, with "Disease" appearing as the album's opening track.

=== Alternative versions ===
Gaga released two self-produced live versions of "Disease", one performed on piano and the other on electric guitar. On November 13, 2024, a live version subtitled "The Antidote Live" was released worldwide digitally by Interscope and to Italian radio airplay by Universal. Another live version, subtitled "The Poison Live", was released digitally on November 20 by Interscope. They were both accompanied by visual videos and instrumental versions. Filmed at Woodshed Studios in Malibu, California, the video for "The Antidote Live" version features Gaga performing a stripped-down rendition on a black grand piano with acoustic guitar accompaniment and a backing track. Gaga stated that this version was "really delicate and almost somber" because the song's chorus was originally written on piano. In the video for "The Poison Live" version, she performs an electric guitar rendition with assistance from guitarist Tim Stewart. Gaga explained that the use of electric guitar introduced a "sense of fun" that contrasted with the emotional "torture" of the lyrics, while Stewart's chord inversions added a feeling of "hurt", which she found interesting.

== Composition ==
"Disease"
A sample of the chorus of "Disease", featuring industrial, EDM, and techno-heavy beats, and Gaga's growling vocals

"Disease" is 3 minutes and 49 seconds long. It is an electropop, dark pop, dance-pop, synth-pop, industrial dance, industrial pop, and EDM song, with gothic, industrial rock, rock, rage, and punk influences. It features an upbeat arrangement, a midtempo rhythm, grungy guitars, and industrial, EDM, and techno-heavy four-on-the-floor beats. Gaga sings with growling vocals in the chorus and uses her falsetto register in the bridge. Peter Piatkowski of PopMatters described "Disease" as a "bouncing, strutting" track that "employs a large Wall of Sound-like approach." Several critics compared the song's heavy electronic and industrial production to the music of Nine Inch Nails. Roisin O'Connor from The Independent thought that Gaga's vocals and the "squelching" synth line evoked George Michael's single "Freeek!" (2002). Writing for V magazine, Stephanie Wong believed that the song's "bold" EDM-heavy sound evoked Gaga's early work and "the maximalist style being popularized by artists like Charli XCX". Ed Power of The Irish Times opined that "Disease" contained "gravity-warping beats and a chorus that goes off like a jet-fuelled Eurovision anthem".

Several journalists found "Disease" similar to Gaga's singles "Bad Romance" (2009) and "The Cure" (2017)". (Note: Attributed to multiple references:) Alexis Petridis of The Guardian particularly compared her "strident, imperious" vocals to those of "The Cure" and "Poker Face" (2008). He compared the track to Gaga's album The Fame (2008), while Alexa Camp from Slant Magazine likened its composition to The Fame Monster (2009) and Born This Way (2011). Kristen S. Hé of Vulture opined that "Disease" recalled the themes of "sex and sickness" of Gaga's 2013 songs "Do What U Want" and "Swine", although "she's no longer consumed by darkness but in control of it". Hé interpreted the track as a rejection of the idea that "great art must come from suffering". For American Songwriter's Tom Donovan, the track harks back to Gaga's cover version of "The Joker" from her 2024 album Harlequin.

Gaga said that "Disease" served as an entry point "into the chaos of the album", symbolizing uncomfortable emotions and negative internal dialogues. The lyrics explore love's ability to heal a partner's "tortured" disease and "seeing the vulnerabilities of being in a dark place ... and how this can lead to self-nurturing and coexistence". Gaga sings in the chorus, "I could play the doctor, I can cure your disease / If you were a sinner, I could make you believe / Lay you down like one, two, three / Eyes roll back in ecstasy". Nick Levine of the BBC dubbed the lyrics "melodramatic" and wrote that the song was a "welcome reminder that she stormed the mainstream by making music that was catchy and freaky in equal measure."

== Critical reception ==
Professional ratings
Review scores
Source	Rating
Clash	9/10
Evening Standard	5/5 stars
The Guardian	4/5 stars
The Independent	4/5 stars

"Disease" received acclaim from critics, who praised its production and Gaga's vocal performance. Journalists from Consequence named it the "Song of the Week" upon its release, describing it as a "four minute reminder that pop music is where so many elements of performance have the opportunity to coalesce." Stephen Ackroyd of Dork found it "dark, dramatic and impossibly catchy". Clash's Robin Murray praised the chorus and described "Disease" as "lustful, salacious, and industrial". Evening Standard's India Block praised the production, religious themes, and Gaga's vocals, deeming the track a "high gothic blast that's perfect for spooky season". The Independent's Helen Brown similarly commended Gaga's vocals and the song's "compellingly wonky pace". Adam White from the same publication found the track "incredibly frenetic", and "really made by Gaga's snarling vocal". V magazine's Wong praised Gaga's "gorgeously powerful vocals" and the song's "thunderous beats".

Stephen Daw of Billboard listed "Disease" as the ninth-best track on Mayhem and considered it a brooding dark-pop return to Gaga's "twisted pop origins". Paste's Sam Rosenberg wrote that it was an "exciting, promising" introduction to Mayhem's thematic exploration of chaos, adding that its dark nature was engaging enough to keep the album's energy flowing. Beats Per Minute's JT Early thought that the contrast between the song's "empowering" message and "clanging" production highlighted "darkness as a constant thing to overcome". Slant Magazine's Camp and O'Connor considered the lyrics generic but praised the sound and production; the latter said that "Disease" was "her best in a long while".

Rolling Stone ranked "Disease" as the 17th-best song of 2024, with Brittany Spanos calling it a "thrilling and very welcome return to form". The Guardian picked it as the 18th-best track of 2024; Ben Beaumont-Thomas dubbed it a "triumphant return to her core electro-pop sound". In a 2024 ranking of Gaga's seven lead singles, Marcus Wratten of PinkNews placed "Disease" at number four and praised its production.

== Commercial performance ==
"Disease" reached number 14 on the Billboard Global 200 chart dated November 9, 2024. In the United States, the track peaked at number 5 on the Hot Dance/Pop Songs chart, number 16 on the Adult Pop Airplay chart, number 17 on the Pop Airplay chart, and number 27 on the Billboard Hot 100 chart. In the United Kingdom, "Disease" debuted at number seven on the UK Singles Chart, marking the sixteenth top-ten song in Gaga's career. "Disease" additionally reached the top 30 on the charts of Greece (6), the Czech Republic (10), Ireland (11), Latvia (14), Slovakia (20), Brazil (21), the Netherlands (25), Portugal (25), Lithuania (26), Switzerland (27), and Canada (28). The track was certified diamond in Brazil, platinum in Canada, gold in France, New Zealand, and Poland, and silver in the United Kingdom.

== Music video ==
=== Background and synopsis ===
Gaga shared a snippet from the music video for "Disease" on her social media on October 22, 2024. It depicts her wearing a white dress and running from a car driving towards her on a suburban street; she turns back to the mystery driver several times throughout the video as she tries to escape. Vulture's Jason P. Frank compared the dress in the video to that of Samara Morgan from the 2002 psychological horror film The Ring. On October 29, Gaga announced via social media that, in celebration of Halloween, the music video would be released later that day as part of a double feature, alongside a live video of her and Bruno Mars performing "Die with a Smile" during Mars's Las Vegas residency.

The video was directed by Tanu Muiño and choreographed by Parris Goebel. Gaga stated that "we started exploring with the choreography this idea of me battling myself". She expressed that "chaos and turmoil" makes her feel "claustrophobic" and that she eventually faces "the parts of myself that scare[s] me" no matter how much she tries to avoid them. In an interview with Rolling Stone, Gaga said that the video was a response to the negative reception of her film Joker: Folie à Deux: "I put so much of that energy into that video ... I was like, 'I'll show you who I am, and I'll show you what this fight is like'". She remarked that the video's filming left her mentally unsettled and that it lingered in her thoughts for weeks as she tried to understand its meaning; she realized that it revealed a "side of me that's scared of another side", which showed that she "was not done healing".

The four-and-a-half-minute video mostly takes place in a quiet suburban neighborhood, while a scene where one of Gaga's dancers is standing on her shoulders was shot inside a mental asylum in Pasadena, California. The video opens with a "possessed-looking" Gaga lying across the hood of a car. The visuals depict Gaga facing different versions of herself and trying to regain control of her personified fears. One incarnation shows a red-eyed figure dressed in an all-black leather outfit, complete with a zippered mask and steel-studded fingernails. She runs over a "more innocent" counterpart wearing a nightgown with a floral print. A white-clad figure in a crop top and briefs steps over her clone while being handcuffed to the ceiling, and another incarnation emerges from a dark pool of vomit before becoming trapped between two colliding walls. Throughout the video, these figures of Gaga are shown engaging in fights, running down the street, dancing, or embracing each other.

=== Reception and analysis ===
In the music video for "Disease", Gaga embraces a macabre version of herself with an all-black outfit and long fingernails, which was compared to the film Edward Scissorhands (1990).

The video received praise from fans and critics. HuffPost UK's Daniel Welsh wrote that it lives up to Gaga's reputation of "pushing the envelope" with her music videos. Elle's Erica Gonzales deemed it "haunting and at times disturbing", and Attitude's Jamie Tabberer dubbed it "dark, twisted, and deeply personal" and compared it to horror films. Christian Allaire from Vogue and Gonzales praised its theme and avant-garde fashion costumes. Uproxx's Flisadam Pointer commended the production, costumes, and Gaga's performance. Matthew Velasco from W magazine dubbed the video "cinematic" and said that it has "almost theater-like experience". He found its theme reminiscent of The Fame Monster era and the music videos for Gaga's singles "Bad Romance" and "Alejandro" (2010). Nylon's Dylan Kickham similarly compared its horror-leaning theme to Gaga's previous works. Elamin Abdelmahmoud from CBC Radio thought that it recalled Marilyn Manson's videos from the mid-1990s.

American Songwriter's Donovan thought that the video's gothic aesthetic was reminiscent of the film Edward Scissorhands (1990); he also opined that it recalled the music video for Nine Inch Nails' song "Closer" (1994) due to its themes of fetishism, sadomasochism, and self-destruction. Danielle Chelosky from Stereogum similarly thought that the video evoked Edward Scissorhands, particularly due to the character dressed in all black with long fingernails. Rolling Stone's Brian Hiatt wrote that while Gaga had previously explored horror-inspired visuals, the "Disease" video stands out as "remarkably uncompromising" and a "coded tour of her darkest thoughts". He compared the scene where the masked character "retches up a large quantity of black bile" to Gaga's performance of her song "Swine" at South by Southwest in 2014, where performance artist Millie Brown vomited paint over her.

== Live performances and cover versions ==
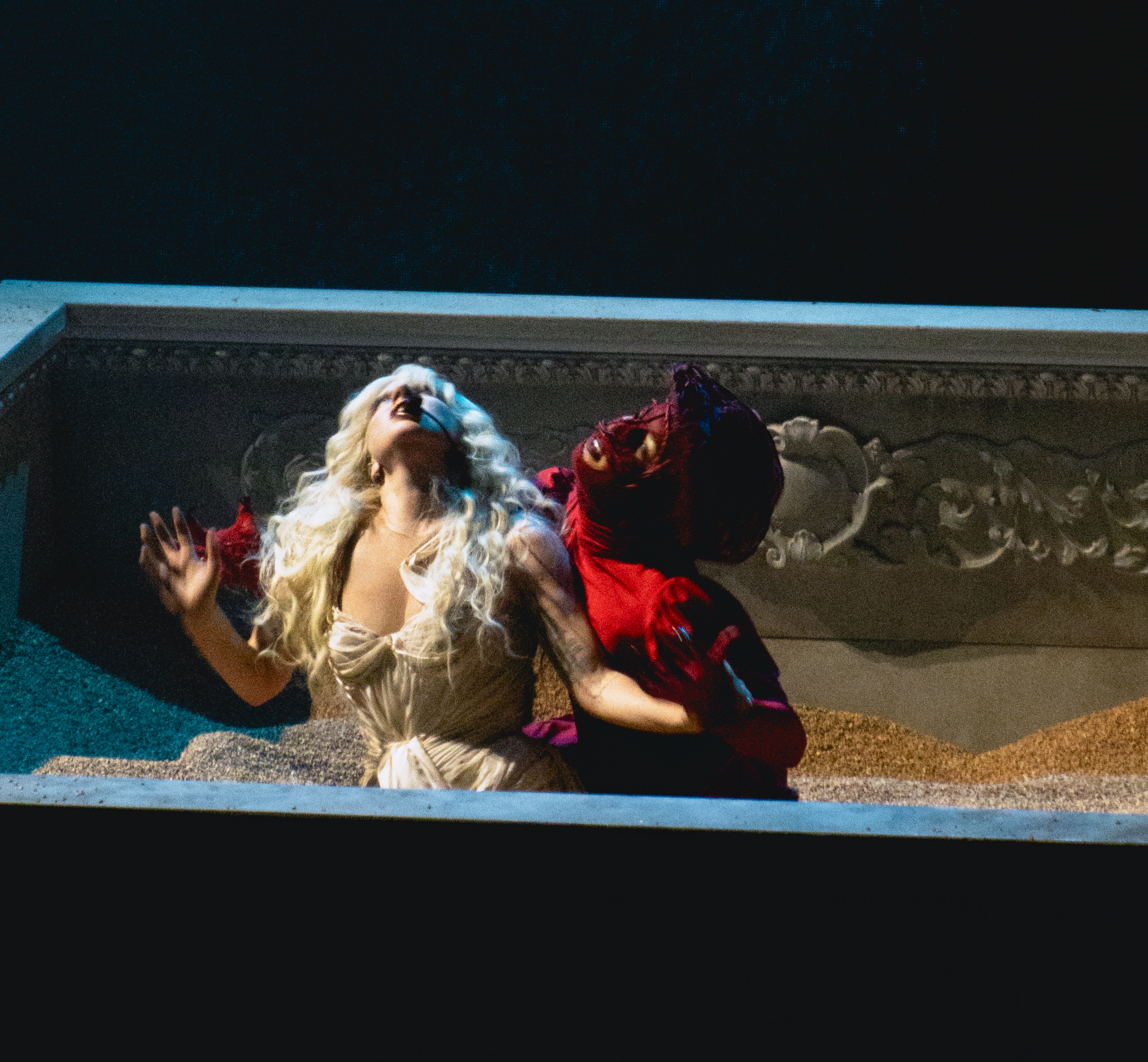
Gaga performing "Disease" at the Mayhem Ball in 2025

Gaga first performed "Disease" during a Christmas special of the television series Carpool Karaoke, which premiered on December 15, 2024, on Apple Music and Apple TV+. She included the track in the set list of The Art of Personal Chaos concerts in 2025–2026, including a headlining set at Coachella and the Mayhem Ball tour. During the performance, Gaga, dressed in a white gown and platinum blonde hair, fights several skull-faced dancers and a red-dressed doppelgänger; they fight in a sandbox–representing a grave–before Gaga is ultimately strangled. Livia Caligor from W magazine wrote that the performance revisited the "Gothic dreamscape of [Gaga's] past" and thought that the skeletal dancers represented her "inner demons". Adrian Horton of The Guardian picked "Disease" as the highlight of Gaga's show, and Wesley Morris from The New York Times Magazine commended how "in spite of all the tussling and writhing, she didn't miss a note." The performance was choreographed by Parris Goebel, who revealed that she used cat litter to fill the sandbox.

A reimagined version of "Disease" appeared in Gaga's concert film and live album Apple Music Live: Mayhem Requiem, released on May 14, 2026. The performance was recorded during an invite-only concert at the Wiltern Theatre in Los Angeles in January 2026. As the opening number, Gaga appeared dressed in black and wearing a chain-mail veil, while the song's arrangement remained relatively close to the studio version.

In November 2024, Cassyette shared a video singing a screamcore rendition of "Disease", to which Gaga reacted favorably. The full cover version was released on December 7, 2024. In October 2025, Demi Lovato performed a mashup of "Disease" and fellow Mayhem track "Perfect Celebrity" on BBC Radio 1's Live Lounge, joined by a backup band. The cover of "Disease" featured a slight rock edge compared to the original version.

== Accolades ==
Awards and nominations for "Disease"
Organization	Year	Category	Result	Ref.
BMI Pop Awards	2026	Most-Performed Songs of the Year	Won	
Grammy Awards	2026	Best Pop Solo Performance	Nominated	
Hollywood Music Video Awards	2025	Music Video of the Year	Nominated	
Hollywood Music Video Awards	2025	Best Hair & Makeup	Won	
Hollywood Music Video Awards	2025	Best Sci-Fi & Thriller	Nominated	
MTV Video Music Awards Japan	2025	Video of the Year	Nominated	
MTV Video Music Awards Japan	2025	Best Solo Artist Video – International	Won	

== Credits and personnel ==
Credits are adapted from the liner notes of Mayhem.

- Lady Gaga – songwriter, producer, lead vocals, background vocals, synthesizer
- Andrew Watt – songwriter, producer, synthesizer, drums, bass guitar, electric guitar, percussion
- Cirkut – songwriter, producer, synthesizer, keyboards, bass programming, drum programming
- Michael Polansky – songwriter
- Paul Lamalfa – recording engineer
- Serban Ghenea – mixing engineer
- Randy Merrill – mastering engineer
- Marco Sonzini – additional engineer
- Tyler Harris – assistant engineer
- Bryce Bordone – assistant mixing engineer
- Marc VanGool – studio technician

Recording

- Recorded at Shangri-La.
- Mixed at MixStar Studios (Virginia Beach, Virginia)
- Mastered at Sterling Sound (New York City)

== Charts ==
=== Weekly charts ===
Weekly chart performance for "Disease"
Chart (2024–2025)	Peak position
Australia (ARIA)	39
Austria (Ö3 Austria Top 40)	52
Belarus Airplay (TopHit)	30
Brazil Hot 100 (Billboard)	21
Canada Hot 100 (Billboard)	28
Canada CHR/Top 40 (Billboard)	24
Canada Hot AC (Billboard)	24
CIS Airplay (TopHit)	6
Croatia International Airplay (Top lista)	12
Czech Republic Airplay (ČNS IFPI)	10
Czech Republic Singles Digital (ČNS IFPI)	58
Estonia Airplay (TopHit)	48
Finland (Suomen virallinen lista)	40
France (SNEP)	66
Germany (GfK)	70
Greece International (IFPI)	6
Global 200 (Billboard)	14
Ireland (IRMA)	11
Israel International Airplay (Media Forest)	8
Italy (FIMI)	53
Japan Hot Overseas (Billboard Japan)	3
Kazakhstan Airplay (TopHit)	7
Latvia (LaIPA)	14
Latvia Airplay (LaIPA)	7
Lebanon Airplay (Lebanese Top 20)	9
Lithuania (AGATA)	26
Netherlands (Dutch Top 40)	25
Netherlands (Single Top 100)	54
New Zealand Hot Singles (RMNZ)	5
Poland (Polish Airplay Top 100)	44
Poland (Polish Streaming Top 100)	43
Portugal (AFP)	25
Russia Airplay (TopHit)	8
San Marino Airplay (SMRRTV Top 50)	9
Slovakia Airplay (ČNS IFPI)	20
Slovakia Singles Digital (ČNS IFPI)	40
South Korea Download (Circle)	179
Spain (Promusicae)	58
Sweden (Sverigetopplistan)	53
Switzerland (Schweizer Hitparade)	27
Ukraine Airplay (TopHit)	49
UK Singles (Official Charts)	7
Uruguay Anglo Airplay (Monitor Latino)	4
US Billboard Hot 100	27
US Adult Pop Airplay (Billboard)	16
US Hot Dance/Pop Songs (Billboard)	5
US Pop Airplay (Billboard)	17
Venezuela Airplay (Record Report)	38

=== Monthly charts ===
Monthly chart performance for "Disease"
Chart (2024–2025)	Peak position
Belarus Airplay (TopHit)	37
CIS Airplay (TopHit)	11
Czech Republic (Rádio Top 100)	77
Estonia Airplay (TopHit)	44
Kazakhstan Airplay (TopHit)	12
Latvia Airplay (TopHit)	5
Lithuania Airplay (TopHit)	3
Russia Airplay (TopHit)	14
Slovakia (Rádio Top 100)	26
Ukraine Airplay (TopHit)	63

=== Year-end charts ===
Year-end chart performance for "Disease"
Chart (2024)	Position
CIS Airplay (TopHit)	179
Russia Airplay (TopHit)	194

Year-end chart performance
Chart (2025)	Position
Belarus Airplay (TopHit)	195
Canada CHR/Top 40 (Billboard)	72
Canada Hot AC (Billboard)	70
CIS Airplay (TopHit)	122
Russia Airplay (TopHit)	103
US Hot Dance/Pop Songs (Billboard)	18

== Certifications ==
Certifications for "Disease"
Region	Certification	Certified units/sales
Brazil (Pro-Música Brasil)	Diamond	160,000^{‡}
Canada (Music Canada)	Platinum	80,000^{‡}
France (SNEP)	Gold	100,000^{‡}
New Zealand (RMNZ)	Gold	15,000^{‡}
Poland (ZPAV)	Gold	62,500^{‡}
United Kingdom (BPI)	Silver	200,000^{‡}
^{‡} Sales+streaming figures based on certification alone.

== Release history ==
"Disease" release history
Region	Date	Format(s)	Version(s)	Label	Ref.
Various	October 25, 2024	Digital download; streaming	Original	Interscope	
Italy	October 25, 2024	Radio airplay	Original	Universal	
United States	October 29, 2024	Contemporary hit radio	Original	Interscope	
Various	November 13, 2024	Digital download; streaming	The Antidote Live; The Antidote Live Instrumental	Interscope	
Italy	November 13, 2024	Radio airplay	The Antidote Live	Universal	
Various	November 20, 2024	Digital download; streaming	The Poison Live; The Poison Live Instrumental	Interscope	
