= La Verdad =

La Verdad may refer to:

- La Verdad (horse), a racehorse
- La Verdad (Maracaibo), a Venezuelan regional newspaper
- La Verdad (Murcia), a daily newspaper based in Murcia, Spain
