= Verdad (1950) =

- Type: Daily
- Format: Tabloid
- Publisher: Communist Party of Uruguay
- Founded: 1950
- Ceased publication: 1951
- Language: Spanish
- Headquarters: Montevideo
- Sister newspapers: Justicia

Verdad ('Truth') was a short-lived daily tabloid newspaper published in Montevideo, Uruguay, published in the early 1950s as an organ of the Communist Party of Uruguay. The publication was launched in late August 1950, in the run-up to the general election held in that year.

Verdad carried four pages. The newspaper carried the byline Vocero diario del Partido Comunista ('Daily organ of the Communist Party'). Initially the newspaper was mainly oriented towards Communist Party cadres, but was available for external subscriptions.

The financial situation of the newspaper was dire, and it was run by a small editorial team. The editorial office of Verdad was based in Casa de La Prensa Comunista, together with the party fortnightly Justicia and the monthly Nosotras. Héctor Rodríguez, Member of Parliament, textile workers' leader and the National Propaganda Secretary of the Communist Party, served as the director of Verdad (albeit this was more of a symbolic appointment, Rodríguez lacked time to manage the day-to-day affairs of the newspaper). Editors and key contributors of Verdad included Niko Schvarz, César Reyes Daglio, Ismael Weinberger, Luciano Weinberger and Juan Carlos Urruzola.

In February 1951 Rodríguez was demoted by the party leadership and removed from the post as Verdad director. Verdad was closed down in late 1951, as the Communist Party opted to concentrate its resources on converting the main party organ Justicia into a daily. The editorial team of Verdad joined Justicia.
