= Louis Verdad =

Mexican American fashion designer

Louis Verdad is a Mexican-American fashion designer. Verdad was born in Chicago, Illinois to immigrant parents, and relocated to his family's native Mexico at the age of four. At age 20 he returned to Chicago, where the first art school he attended dismissed him because his English was poor. He eventually graduated from the Ray-Vogue College of Design, then moved to Atlanta, Georgia, where he struggled to make ends meet.

Verdad later moved to Los Angeles and took a job as a product developer for Target. He started a small workshop at his home and created a small clothing line. He received his first big break when actress Milla Jovovich purchased one of his designs. From there, other stars followed. His rise followed Hollywood's so-called recent "Latin Boom", and his first clients included Christina Aguilera.

Verdad's style has come to be defined as "sensually vintage", which he defines as "sensual, rather than sexual." Today, he is known for designing the two-piece cashmere suit Madonna wore during her performance at the 2003 MTV Video Music Awards. He consults with Vogue editor Anna Wintour and is a favorite of Eva Longoria. He has also designed for Cate Blanchett, Cher, Paris Hilton, Halle Berry and Oprah Winfrey.

His clothes now sell in Neiman Marcus and Saks Fifth Avenue.
