= Hot Dance/Pop Songs =

Weekly music chart ranking dance and pop songs

The Hot Dance/Pop Songs chart has been published weekly by Billboard beginning in January 2025. A sister chart to their Hot Dance/Electronic Songs chart, the creation of the Hot Dance/Pop Songs chart was announced on December 10, 2024. The chart contains 15 positions and ranks the most popular dance pop songs in the U.S. according to audience impressions, physical and digital song sales, and streaming. The first number-one on the chart, in the issue dated January 18, 2025, was "It's OK I'm OK" by Tate McRae.

The current number-one song is "Midnight Sun" by Zara Larsson.

== Background and eligibility criteria ==
As a result of the increase in the popularity of dance and electronic music, Billboard introduced the Dance/Electronic Songs chart in January 2013 to rank the most popular dance and electronic song according to airplay audience impressions, digital downloads, streaming and club play and publishes it on a weekly basis. On December 10, 2024, Billboard announced that they would be revamping the chart in order to "better recognize the varied sounds" of the electronic music genre. As of the chart dated January 18, 2025, songs eligible to debut on that chart will be those primarily recorded by DJs or producers, with an emphasis on electronic-based production. Billboard advised that the Dance/Pop Songs chart will feature tracks with more of a focus on "dance-centric vocals, melody, and hooks by artists not rooted in the dance genre". Songs co-billed to both a DJ/producer and a singer who extends beyond the dance genre may be eligible for both Hot Dance/Electronic Songs and Hot Dance/Pop Songs. Artists such as Charli XCX, bbno$ and Kesha, all of which had multiple songs on the Hot Dance/Electronic Songs on the issue dated January 11, 2025, were completely removed off the chart the next week and debuted on the Hot Dance/Pop Songs chart.

The Hot Dance/Pop Songs chart uses the same methodology as the Hot Dance/Electronic Songs chart, with ranking being based on U.S. streams and sales tracked by Luminate, as well as radio airplay audio impressions measured by Mediabase.

== Artist achievements ==
=== Artists with most number-one songs ===
Artists with at least two number-ones
Position	Artist name	Tally of number-ones	Ref.
1	Tate McRae	3	
2	Zara Larsson	2	

=== Most consecutive top positions simultaneously occupied ===
Number	Artist	Date	Ref.
3	Zara Larsson	May 2, 2026	

== Song achievements ==
=== Most weeks at number one ===
Weeks	Song	Artist(s)	Year(s)	Ref.
29	"How It's Done"	Huntrix: Ejae, Audrey Nuna and Rei Ami	2025–26	
20	"Stateside"	PinkPantheress with Zara Larsson	2026	
18	"Abracadabra"	Lady Gaga	2025–26	
18	"Midnight Sun"	Zara Larsson	2026	
4	"It's OK I'm OK"	Tate McRae	2025	
4	"Aperture"	Harry Styles	2026	

== See also ==
- List of Billboard number-one dance songs of 2025
- List of Billboard number-one dance songs of 2026
