= Lady Gaga discography =

Recordings by American singer

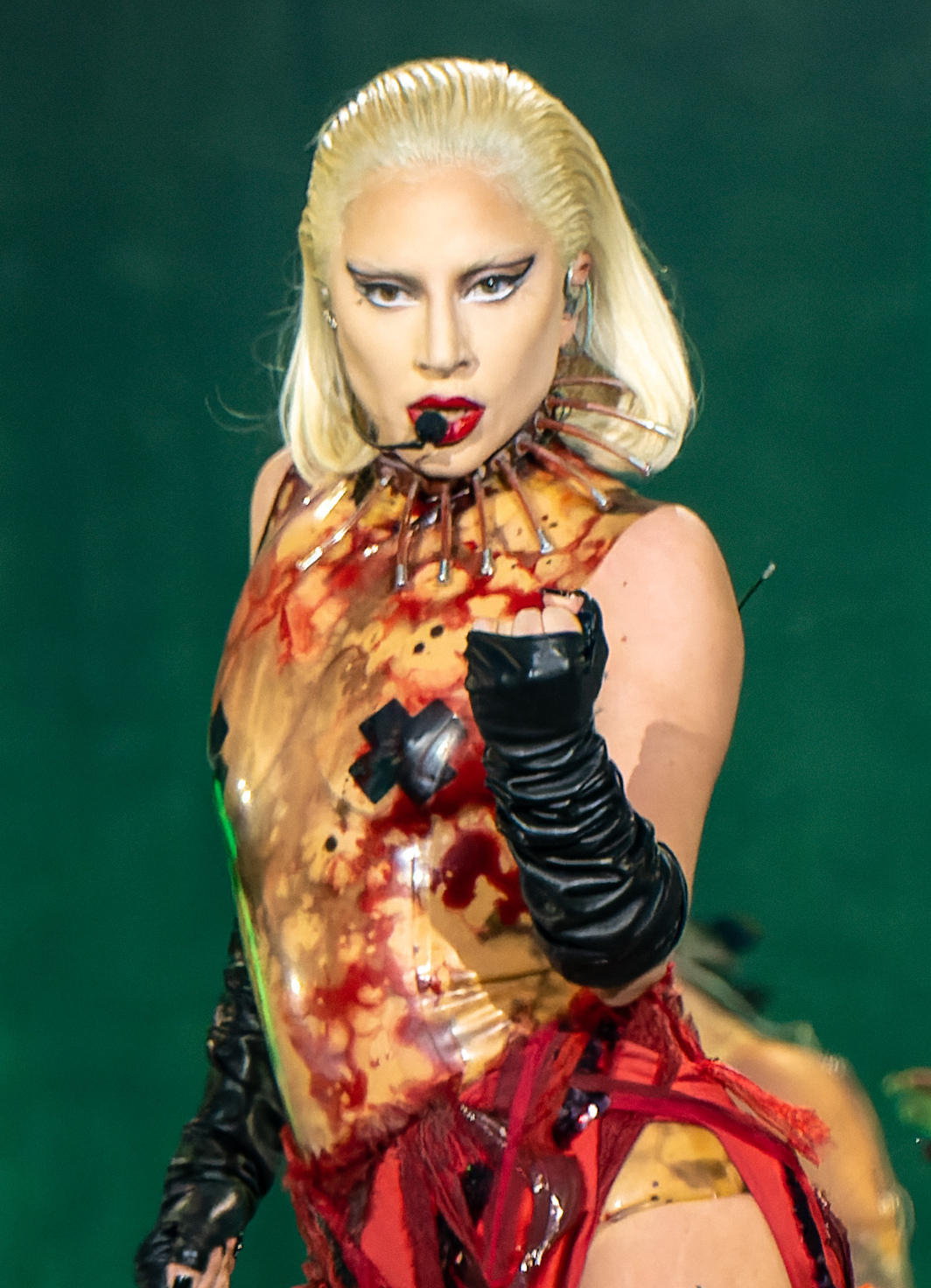
- Lady Gaga performing during The Chromatica Ball tour (2022), in support of her fifth studio album, Chromatica
- Studio albums: 8
- Extended plays: 4
- Soundtrack albums: 4
- Live albums: 2
- Singles: 42
- Video albums: 2
- Remix albums: 3
- Promotional singles: 16
- Reissue albums: 2
- Box sets: 2

American singer Lady Gaga has released six solo studio albums, two collaborative studio albums, four film soundtracks, three remix albums, two box sets, four extended plays (EPs), three live albums, 42 singles (including four as a featured artist), and 16 promotional singles. Gaga made her debut in August 2008 with the studio album The Fame, which peaked at number two in the United States, where it was subsequently certified triple Platinum, while topping the charts in Austria, Canada, Germany, Switzerland, and the United Kingdom. Its first two singles, "Just Dance" and "Poker Face", reached number one in Australia, Canada, the United Kingdom, and the United States, and for the latter, becoming the world's biggest single of the 2009 calendar year. The album spawned three more singles: "Eh, Eh (Nothing Else I Can Say)", "LoveGame" and "Paparazzi". The latter reached the top ten in many countries worldwide, and number one in Germany.

Gaga later released The Fame Monster in November 2009, as a deluxe edition or reissue of The Fame, which was ultimately released also as a standalone EP. It reached number one in Australia, New Zealand, and the United Kingdom, as well as number five in the United States, where it was certified Platinum. Its lead single, "Bad Romance", became an international hit and reached number one in twelve countries while topping at number two in the United States. Subsequent singles, "Telephone" and "Alejandro", were top ten hits in many countries. Consisting of various remixes of songs from both The Fame and The Fame Monster, Gaga's first compilation album The Remix was released in 2010. It peaked at number six in the United States while reaching the top five in Canada and the United Kingdom. The remix album has sold 500,000 copies worldwide, therefore making it one of the best-selling remix albums of all time.

The singer's second studio album, Born This Way, was released in May 2011 and reached the number-one spot in the United States along with twenty other countries. Its eponymous lead single was an international success, peaking at number one in nineteen countries including the United States, where it became her third number-one single. The other singles from the album were "Judas", "The Edge of Glory", "You and I", "Marry the Night", and "Bloody Mary". Gaga's third studio album, Artpop, was released in November 2013 and includes the singles "Applause" and "Do What U Want". In September 2014, Gaga and Tony Bennett released the collaborative album Cheek to Cheek, which debuted at number one in the US, becoming Gaga's third consecutive number one album. Her fifth album, Joanne, was released in October 2016. Its lead single, "Perfect Illusion", debuted at number one in France, while second single "Million Reasons" reached number four in the United States. When Joanne reached number one in the United States, Gaga became the first woman to have four number one albums in the nation during the 2010s.

She extended the record in 2018 with the release of the soundtrack to A Star Is Born. The soundtrack and its lead single, "Shallow" (with Bradley Cooper), were international hits, reaching number one in the United States, Australia, New Zealand, Switzerland, and the United Kingdom. Her sixth studio album, Chromatica (2020), similarly topped the charts in numerous countries around the world, and also featured the single, "Rain on Me" (with Ariana Grande), which topped the charts in the US, Canada, the UK and several other territories. In September 2021, she released another collaborative album with Bennett titled Love for Sale. Gaga subsequently recorded "Hold My Hand" for the 2022 film Top Gun: Maverick and composed its score alongside Lorne Balfe, Harold Faltermeyer, and Hans Zimmer. She also recorded "Die with a Smile" (2024) with Bruno Mars, which topped both the Billboard Global 200 for seventeen weeks and other charts in more than twenty countries, became the longest-reigning daily hit in Spotify history, and made Gaga the first artist to have multiple number one songs in the United States in the 2000s, 2010s and 2020s. The track along with the singles "Disease" and "Abracadabra" were included on Gaga's album, Mayhem, released on March 7, 2025.

Gaga is one of the world's best-selling music artists, with sales of 124 million records, and has produced some of the best-selling singles of all time. She has also sold around 7.25 million singles in the United Kingdom, and 11.46 million albums in the US; in the latter country she is the first and only artist to have two songs pass 7 million downloads sold ("Poker Face" and "Just Dance"). According to the Recording Industry Association of America (RIAA), Gaga is among the top digital singles artist in the United States, with cumulative single certifications of 87.5 million digital downloads and on-demand streaming, (Note: As of September 2023, Gaga has had cumulative single certifications of 82.5 million digital downloads and on-demand streaming as a solo artist, and 5 million with Bradley Cooper.) being the first woman to receive the Digital Diamond Award certification from RIAA, and one of the few artists with at least three Diamond certified songs ("Bad Romance", "Poker Face" and "Just Dance"). By 2020, six of her singles appeared on the International Federation of the Phonographic Industry's annual Top 10 Global Singles chart ("Just Dance", "Poker Face", "Bad Romance", "Telephone", "Born This Way" and "Shallow"), setting the record for the most entries by any female artist.

== Albums ==
=== Solo studio albums ===
List of solo studio albums, with selected chart positions, sales figures and certifications
Title	Details	Peak chart positions										Sales	Certifications
Title	Details	US	AUS	AUT	CAN	FRA	GER	ITA	NZ	SWI	UK	Sales	Certifications
The Fame	Released: August 19, 2008; Labels: Streamline, KonLive, Cherrytree, Interscope; Formats: CD, digital download, LP, streaming, USB flash drive	2	3	1	1	2	1	13	2	1	1	US: 4,830,000; CAN: 315,000; FRA: 700,000; UK: 3,074,496	RIAA: 6× Platinum; ARIA: 6× Platinum; BPI: 12× Platinum; BVMI: 13× Gold; FIMI: 5× Platinum; IFPI AUT: 7× Platinum; IFPI SWI: 4× Platinum; MC: 7× Platinum; SNEP: 3× Diamond
Born This Way	Released: May 23, 2011; Labels: Streamline, KonLive, Interscope; Formats: CD, digital download, LP, streaming, USB flash drive	1	1	1	1	1	1	1	1	1	1	US: 2,430,000; CAN: 93,000; FRA: 237,000; UK: 1,050,000	RIAA: 4× Platinum; ARIA: 3× Platinum; BPI: 4× Platinum; BVMI: 3× Gold; FIMI: 2× Platinum; IFPI AUT: Platinum; IFPI SWI: Platinum; MC: 6× Platinum; RMNZ: 2× Platinum; SNEP: 2× Platinum
Artpop	Released: November 6, 2013; Labels: Streamline, Interscope; Formats: CD, digital download, LP, streaming	1	2	1	3	3	3	2	2	2	1	US: 781,000; FRA: 60,000; UK: 256,000	RIAA: Platinum; ARIA: Gold; BPI: Gold; BVMI: Gold; FIMI: Gold; IFPI AUT: Gold; IFPI SWI: Platinum; MC: Platinum; RMNZ: Platinum; SNEP: Platinum
Joanne	Released: October 21, 2016; Labels: Streamline, Interscope; Formats: CD, digital download, LP, streaming	1	2	9	2	9	6	2	2	3	3	US: 649,000; FRA: 20,000; UK: 168,564	RIAA: Platinum; ARIA: Gold; BPI: Gold; FIMI: Gold; IFPI AUT: Gold; MC: Gold; RMNZ: Platinum; SNEP: Gold
Chromatica	Released: May 29, 2020; Labels: Streamline, Interscope; Formats: Cassette, CD, digital download, LP, streaming	1	1	1	1	1	3	1	1	1	1	US: 331,000; CAN: 30,000; FRA: 36,300; UK: 31,709	RIAA: Platinum; ARIA: Gold; BPI: Gold; FIMI: Platinum; IFPI AUT: Gold; IFPI SWI: Gold; MC: Platinum; RMNZ: Platinum; SNEP: Platinum
Mayhem	Released: March 7, 2025; Labels: Streamline, Interscope; Formats: Cassette, CD, digital download, LP, streaming	1	1	1	1	2	1	1	1	1	1	US: 238,000	RIAA: Platinum; ARIA: Gold; BPI: Gold; BVMI: Gold; FIMI: Platinum; IFPI SWI: Platinum; MC: Platinum; RMNZ: Platinum; SNEP: Platinum

=== Collaborative studio albums ===
List of collaborative studio albums, with selected chart positions, sales figures and certifications
Title	Details	Peak chart positions										Sales	Certifications
Title	Details	US	AUS	AUT	CAN	FRA	GER	ITA	NZ	SWI	UK	Sales	Certifications
Cheek to Cheek (with Tony Bennett)	Released: September 19, 2014; Labels: Streamline, Columbia, Interscope; Formats: CD, digital download, LP, streaming	1	7	6	3	9	12	6	3	7	10	US: 773,000; FRA: 40,000	RIAA: Gold; ARIA: Gold; BPI: Silver; MC: Platinum
Love for Sale (with Tony Bennett)	Released: September 30, 2021; Labels: Streamline, Columbia, Interscope; Formats: Cassette, CD, digital download, LP, streaming	8	11	4	33	6	5	8	—	2	6	US: 38,000	
"—" denotes items which did not chart in that country.

=== Reissues ===
List of reissues, with selected chart positions, sales figures and certifications
Title	Details	Peak chart positions										Sales	Certifications
Title	Details	US	AUS	BEL (WA)	CAN	FRA	ITA	JPN	NLD	NZ	SWE	Sales	Certifications
The Fame Monster	Released: November 18, 2009; Labels: Streamline, KonLive, Cherrytree, Interscope; Formats: CD, digital download, LP, streaming, USB flash drive	5	1	5	6	13	2	2	4	1	2	US: 1,650,000; FRA: 300,000; JPN: 548,000	RIAA: 5× Platinum; ARIA: 4× Platinum; BEA: 2× Platinum; GLF: Platinum; MC: Diamond; NVPI: 2× Platinum; RMNZ: 11× Platinum
Born This Way The Tenth Anniversary	Released: June 25, 2021; Labels: Interscope; Formats: Cassette, CD, digital download, LP, streaming	—	—	—	—	—	—	—	—	—	—		
"—" denotes items which did not chart in that country.

=== Soundtrack albums ===
List of soundtrack albums, with selected chart positions, sales figures and certifications
Title	Details	Peak chart positions										Sales	Certifications
Title	Details	US	AUS	AUT	CAN	FRA	GER	ITA	NZ	SWI	UK	Sales	Certifications
A Star Is Born (with Bradley Cooper)	Released: October 5, 2018; Label: Interscope; Formats: CD, digital download, LP, streaming	1	1	2	1	1	4	4	1	1	1	US: 1,148,000; CAN: 157,000; FRA: 340,000; UK: 544,913	RIAA: 2× Platinum; ARIA: 3× Platinum; BPI: 2× Platinum; BVMI: Platinum; FIMI: 3× Platinum; IFPI AUT: 3× Platinum; IFPI SWI: Platinum; MC: 3× Platinum; RMNZ: 7× Platinum; SNEP: Diamond
Top Gun: Maverick (with Lorne Balfe, Harold Faltermeyer and Hans Zimmer)	Released: May 27, 2022; Label: Interscope; Formats: CD, digital download, LP, streaming	17	11	7	23	17	16	74	16	3	— (Note: Top Gun: Maverick did not enter the UK Albums Chart, but peaked at number one on the UK Compilation Chart.)		BPI: Silver; FIMI: Gold; IFPI SWI: Gold; RMNZ: Platinum; SNEP: Platinum
Harlequin	Released: September 27, 2024; Label: Interscope; Formats: CD, digital download, LP, streaming	20	40	8	66	10	9	12	28	4	11		
Joker: Folie à Deux (with Joaquin Phoenix)	Released: October 4, 2024; Label: Interscope; Formats: CD, digital download, LP, streaming	— (Note: Joker: Folie à Deux did not enter the Billboard 200, but peaked at number 6 on the US Soundtrack Albums chart.)	—	10	—	39	43	92	—	21	— (Note: Joker: Folie à Deux did not enter the UK Albums Chart, but peaked at number 9 on the UK Compilation Chart.)		
"—" denotes items which did not chart in that country.

=== Live albums ===
List of live albums with selected details
Title	Live album details	Peak chart positions		
Title	Live album details	AUS	SWI	UK Down.
Tony Bennett and Lady Gaga: Cheek to Cheek Live!	Release date: October 1, 2021; Label: Interscope; Format: CD, LP	—	—	—
Apple Music Live: Mayhem Requiem	Release date: May 14, 2026; Label: Interscope; Format: Streaming	65	42	2

=== Remix albums ===
List of remix albums, with selected chart positions, sales figures and certifications
Title	Details	Peak chart positions										Sales	Certifications
Title	Details	US	AUS	BEL (WA)	CAN	FRA	ITA	JPN	NZ	SWE	UK	Sales	Certifications
The Remix	Released: March 3, 2010; Labels: Streamline, KonLive, Cherrytree, Interscope; Formats: CD, digital download, LP, streaming	6	12	6	5	19	22	7	9	40	3	US: 316,000; FRA: 50,000; UK: 166,440	BPI: Gold; RIAJ: Platinum
Born This Way: The Remix	Released: November 21, 2011; Labels: Streamline, KonLive, Interscope; Formats: CD, digital download, LP, streaming	105	62	69	49	71	89	14	—	—	77	US: 62,000; FRA: 10,000; UK: 16,094	RIAJ: Gold
Dawn of Chromatica	Released: September 3, 2021; Labels: Streamline, Interscope; Formats: CD, digital download, LP, streaming	66	31	85	89	108	49	279	32	—	56		
"—" denotes items which did not chart in that country.

=== Box sets ===
List of box sets, with selected chart positions
Title	Details	Peak chart positions			
Title	Details	GRE	ITA	JPN	KOR
The Singles	Released: December 8, 2010; Label: Universal Music Japan; Format: 9 CDs	—	—	166	—
Born This Way: The Collection	Released: November 21, 2011; Labels: Streamline, KonLive, Interscope; Format: 2 CDs + DVD	49	98	—	18
"—" denotes items which did not chart in that country.

=== Video albums ===
All charts listed here pertain to the DVD or Music Video charts of that nation
Title	Details	Peak chart positions										Certifications
Title	Details	US	AUS	AUT	FRA	GER	ITA	JPN	NLD	SWI	UK	Certifications
Lady Gaga Presents the Monster Ball Tour: At Madison Square Garden	Released: November 21, 2011; Labels: Streamline, KonLive, Interscope; Formats: Blu-ray, digital download, DVD	1	2	5	1	55	1	3	3	2	4	ARIA: 2× Platinum; BPI: Gold; SNEP: 2× Platinum
Tony Bennett and Lady Gaga: Cheek to Cheek Live!	Released: January 20, 2015; Labels: Streamline, Columbia, Interscope; Formats: Blu-ray, DVD, digital download	1	3	7	3	—	3	—	3	—	10	
"—" denotes items which did not chart in that country.

== Extended plays ==
List of EPs, with selected chart positions, sales figures and certifications
Title	Details	Peak chart positions				Sales
Title	Details	US	US Hol.	CAN	MEX	Sales
The Cherrytree Sessions	Released: February 3, 2009; Labels: Streamline, KonLive, Cherrytree, Interscope; Formats: CD, digital download, streaming	—	—	—	32	US: 9,000
Hitmixes	Released: August 25, 2009; Label: Universal Music Canada; Formats: CD	—	—	8	—	
A Very Gaga Holiday	Released: November 22, 2011; Labels: Streamline, KonLive, Interscope; Formats: Digital download, streaming	52	9	74	—	US: 46,000
Live from the Apollo (as Broadcast on SiriusXM)	Released: June 28, 2019; Label: Interscope; Format: Streaming	—	—	—	—	
"—" denotes items which did not chart in that country.

== Singles ==
=== As lead artist ===
==== 2000s ====
List of singles as lead artist released in the 2000s, with selected chart positions and certifications, showing year released and album name
Title	Year	Peak chart positions										Sales	Certifications	Album
Title	Year	US	AUS	AUT	CAN	FRA	GER	ITA	NZ	SWI	UK	Sales	Certifications	Album
"Just Dance" (featuring Colby O'Donis)	2008	1	1	8	1	14	10	36	3	8	1	US: 7,200,000; CAN: 174,000; FRA: 88,000; UK: 968,000	RIAA: 11× Platinum; ARIA: 14× Platinum; BPI: 4× Platinum; BVMI: 2× Platinum; FIMI: Platinum; IFPI AUT: 2× Platinum; IFPI SWI: 2× Platinum; MC: Diamond; RMNZ: 5× Platinum	The Fame
"Poker Face"	2008	1	1	1	1	1	1	2	1	1	1	US: 7,500,000; CAN: 315,000; FRA: 300,000; UK: 1,190,000	RIAA: Diamond; ARIA: 15× Platinum; BPI: 4× Platinum; BVMI: 4× Platinum; FIMI: 2× Platinum; IFPI AUT: 3× Platinum; IFPI SWI: 3× Platinum; MC: Diamond; RMNZ: 6× Platinum	The Fame
"Eh, Eh (Nothing Else I Can Say)"	2009	—	15	—	68	7	—	—	9	—	—	FRA: 52,000	RIAA: Gold; ARIA: 2× Platinum; RMNZ: Gold	The Fame
"LoveGame"	2009	5	4	6	2	5	7	—	12	15	19	US: 2,670,000; FRA: 74,000	RIAA: 3× Platinum; ARIA: 4× Platinum; BPI: Platinum; BVMI: Gold; IFPI AUT: Gold; MC: 2× Platinum; RMNZ: Platinum	The Fame
"Paparazzi"	2009	6	2	3	3	6	1	3	5	4	4	US: 3,600,000; FRA: 120,000	RIAA: 5× Platinum; ARIA: 6× Platinum; BPI: 2× Platinum; BVMI: 3× Gold; FIMI: Platinum; IFPI AUT: Platinum; IFPI SWI: Gold; RMNZ: 2× Platinum	The Fame
"Bad Romance"	2009	2	2	1	1	1	1	1	2	2	1	US: 5,900,000; CAN: 160,000; FRA: 250,000; UK: 1,050,000	RIAA: 11× Platinum; ARIA: 11× Platinum; BPI: 4× Platinum; BVMI: 3× Gold; FIMI: 2× Platinum; IFPI AUT: 2× Platinum; IFPI SWI: Platinum; MC: Diamond; RMNZ: 5× Platinum; SNEP: Platinum	The Fame Monster
"—" denotes a recording that did not chart in that territory.

==== 2010s ====
List of singles as lead artist released in the 2010s, with selected chart positions and certifications, showing year released and album name
Title	Year	Peak chart positions										Sales	Certifications	Album
Title	Year	US	AUS	AUT	CAN	FRA	GER	ITA	NZ	SWI	UK	Sales	Certifications	Album
"Telephone" (featuring Beyoncé)	2010	3	3	3	3	3	3	2	3	4	1	US: 3,500,000; FRA: 120,000; UK: 736,000	RIAA: 5× Platinum; ARIA: 8× Platinum; BPI: 3× Platinum; BVMI: Gold; FIMI: Platinum; IFPI AUT: Platinum; IFPI SWI: Gold; MC: 3× Platinum; RMNZ: 3× Platinum; SNEP: Gold	The Fame Monster
"Alejandro"	2010	5	2	2	4	3	2	2	11	3	7	US: 2,630,000; FRA: 130,000	RIAA: 4× Platinum; ARIA: 4× Platinum; BPI: Platinum; BVMI: Platinum; FIMI: 2× Platinum; IFPI AUT: Platinum; IFPI SWI: Platinum; RMNZ: Platinum; SNEP: Gold	The Fame Monster
"Dance in the Dark"	2010	— (Note: "Dance in the Dark" did not enter the Billboard Hot 100, but peaked at number 22 on the Bubbling Under Hot 100 chart.)	24	—	88	—	—	—	—	—	89	US: 120,000	ARIA: Platinum	The Fame Monster
"Born This Way"	2011	1	1	1	1	2	1	2	1	1	3	US: 4,300,000; FRA: 100,000; UK: 726,000	RIAA: 6× Platinum; ARIA: 8× Platinum; BPI: 2× Platinum; BVMI: Platinum; FIMI: Platinum; IFPI AUT: 2× Platinum; IFPI SWI: Platinum; MC: 9× Platinum; RMNZ: 3× Platinum	Born This Way
"Judas"	2011	10	6	6	8	7	23	3	12	8	8	US: 1,000,000; FRA: 70,000	RIAA: 2× Platinum; ARIA: 3× Platinum; BPI: Platinum; BVMI: Gold; FIMI: Gold; IFPI AUT: Gold; RMNZ: Platinum	Born This Way
"The Edge of Glory"	2011	3	2	3	3	7	3	2	3	10	6	US: 3,000,000	RIAA: 4× Platinum; ARIA: 5× Platinum; BPI: 2× Platinum; BVMI: Gold; FIMI: Platinum; IFPI AUT: Platinum; IFPI SWI: Gold; RMNZ: Gold	Born This Way
"You and I"	2011	6	14	8	10	98	21	19	5	32	23	US: 2,400,000	RIAA: 3× Platinum; ARIA: 2× Platinum; BPI: Silver; RMNZ: Gold	Born This Way
"The Lady Is a Tramp" (with Tony Bennett)	2011	— (Note: "The Lady Is a Tramp" did not enter the Billboard Hot 100, but peaked at number 21 on the Bubbling Under Hot 100 chart.)	—	—	—	—	—	50	—	—	188			Duets II
"Marry the Night"	2011	29	88	13	11	50	17	42	—	34	16	US: 713,000	RIAA: Platinum; ARIA: Platinum; BPI: Silver	Born This Way
"Applause"	2013	4	11	6	4	3	5	2	7	7	5	US: 2,700,000; FRA: 60,000; UK: 530,000	RIAA: 4× Platinum; ARIA: 4× Platinum; BPI: Platinum; BVMI: Gold; FIMI: Platinum; IFPI AUT: Platinum; MC: 5× Platinum; RMNZ: Platinum	Artpop
"Do What U Want" (featuring R. Kelly)	2013	13	21	10	3	8	14	3	12	14	9	US: 1,300,000; UK: 383,000	RIAA: Platinum; ARIA: Platinum; BPI: Gold; BVMI: Gold; FIMI: Platinum; MC: Gold; RMNZ: Gold	Artpop
"G.U.Y."	2014	76	88	—	—	92	—	94	—	—	115			Artpop
"Anything Goes" (with Tony Bennett)	2014	—	—	—	—	178	—	65	—	—	174	US: 16,000		Cheek to Cheek
"I Can't Give You Anything but Love" (with Tony Bennett)	2014	—	—	—	—	173	—	76	—	—	—			Cheek to Cheek
"Til It Happens to You"	2015	95	—	—	46	46	—	—	—	—	171	US: 71,000		Non-album single
"Perfect Illusion"	2016	15	14	21	17	1	31	5	31	16	12	US: 100,000	RIAA: Gold; ARIA: Platinum; BPI: Silver; FIMI: Gold; MC: Gold; RMNZ: Gold	Joanne
"Million Reasons"	2016	4	34	52	16	29	85	12	— (Note: "Million Reasons" did not enter the NZ Top 40 Singles Chart, but peaked at number two on the NZ Heatseekers Singles Chart.)	7	39	US: 1,100,000	RIAA: 3× Platinum; ARIA: 4× Platinum; BPI: Platinum; BVMI: Gold; FIMI: 3× Platinum; IFPI AUT: Platinum; MC: Gold; RMNZ: 3× Platinum; SNEP: Platinum	Joanne
"The Cure"	2017	39	10	37	33	108	57	36	— (Note: "The Cure" did not enter the NZ Top 40 Singles Chart, but peaked at number three on the NZ Heatseekers Singles Chart.)	41	19	US: 407,215	RIAA: Platinum; ARIA: 3× Platinum; BPI: Gold; FIMI: Platinum; RMNZ: Platinum	Non-album single
"Joanne" (album or piano version)	2017	— (Note: "Joanne" did not enter the Billboard Hot 100, but peaked at number 50 on the US Billboard Digital Song Sales.)	—	—	— (Note: "Joanne" did not enter the Billboard Canadian Hot 100 chart, but peaked at number 48 on the Canadian Digital Song Sales.)	190	—	—	—	—	154			Joanne
"Shallow" (with Bradley Cooper)	2018	1	1	1	1	3	4	2	1	1	1	US: 1,287,000; CAN: 134,000; UK: 224,000	RIAA: 4× Platinum; ARIA: 16× Platinum; BPI: 6× Platinum; BVMI: 2× Platinum; FIMI: 6× Platinum; IFPI AUT: 5× Platinum; IFPI SWI: 2× Platinum; MC: 8× Platinum; RMNZ: 10× Platinum; SNEP: Diamond	A Star Is Born
"Always Remember Us This Way"	2019	41	12	25	26	18	84	41	14	8	25	US: 248,000	RIAA: Platinum; ARIA: 9× Platinum; BPI: 3× Platinum; BVMI: Gold; FIMI: 2× Platinum; IFPI AUT: 2× Platinum; IFPI SWI: Gold; RMNZ: 7× Platinum; SNEP: Diamond	A Star Is Born
"I'll Never Love Again" (with Bradley Cooper)	2019	36	15	73	43	61	—	61	— (Note: "I'll Never Love Again" did not enter the NZ Top 40 Singles Chart, but peaked at number 13 on the NZ Hot Singles Chart.)	14	27	US: 226,000	RIAA: Platinum; ARIA: 3× Platinum; BPI: Platinum; FIMI: Platinum; IFPI AUT: Gold; RMNZ: Platinum; SNEP: Diamond	A Star Is Born
"—" denotes a recording that did not chart in that territory.

==== 2020s ====
List of singles as lead artist released in the 2020s, with selected chart positions and certifications, showing year released and album name
Title	Year	Peak chart positions										Certifications	Album
Title	Year	US	AUS	CAN	FRA	GER	ITA	NZ	SWI	UK	WW	Certifications	Album
"Stupid Love"	2020	5	7	7	36	21	15	23	6	5	—	RIAA: Platinum; ARIA: 2× Platinum; BPI: Platinum; FIMI: Gold; MC: 2× Platinum; RMNZ: Platinum; SNEP: Platinum	Chromatica
"Rain on Me" (with Ariana Grande)	2020	1	2	1	12	9	5	2	5	1	22	RIAA: 2× Platinum; ARIA: 5× Platinum; BPI: 3× Platinum; BVMI: Gold; FIMI: Platinum; MC: 6× Platinum; RMNZ: 3× Platinum; SNEP: Platinum	Chromatica
"911"	2020	— (Note: "911" did not enter the Billboard Hot 100, but peaked at number one on the Bubbling Under Hot 100 chart.)	76	85	141	—	92	— (Note: "911" did not enter the NZ Top 40 Singles Chart, but peaked at number 5 on the NZ Hot Singles Chart.)	—	—	—	ARIA: Gold; FIMI: Gold	Chromatica
"Free Woman"	2021	— (Note: "Free Woman" did not enter the Billboard Hot 100, but peaked at number two on the Bubbling Under Hot 100 chart.)	75	80	143	—	—	— (Note: "Free Woman" did not enter the NZ Top 40 Singles Chart, but peaked at number 6 on the NZ Hot Singles Chart.)	—	—	—		Chromatica
"I Get a Kick Out of You" (with Tony Bennett)	2021	—	—	—	—	—	—	—	—	—	—		Love for Sale
"Hold My Hand"	2022	49	29	25	32	72	57	33	5	24	37	ARIA: 2× Platinum; BPI: Platinum; BVMI: Gold; FIMI: Platinum; IFPI SWI: Platinum; MC: Platinum; RMNZ: Platinum; SNEP: Diamond	Top Gun: Maverick
"Bloody Mary"	2022	41	—	50	43	31	20	—	29	22	31	ARIA: Platinum; BPI: Platinum; FIMI: Platinum; MC: Gold; RMNZ: Gold	Born This Way
"Die with a Smile" (with Bruno Mars)	2024	1	2	1	7	4	16	1	1	2	1	ARIA: 8× Platinum; BPI: 3× Platinum; BVMI: Platinum; FIMI: Platinum; IFPI SWI: Platinum; MC: 8× Platinum; RMNZ: 6× Platinum; SNEP: Diamond	Mayhem
"Disease"	2024	27	39	28	66	70	53	— (Note: "Disease" did not enter the NZ Top 40 Singles Chart, but peaked at number 5 on the NZ Hot Singles Chart.)	27	7	14	BPI: Silver; MC: Platinum; RMNZ: Gold; SNEP: Gold	Mayhem
"Abracadabra"	2025	13	12	12	13	4	28	13	5	3	5	ARIA: 2× Platinum; BPI: Platinum; BVMI: Gold; FIMI: Gold; IFPI SWI: Platinum; MC: 2× Platinum; RMNZ: Platinum; SNEP: Diamond	Mayhem
"The Dead Dance" (Note: "The Dead Dance" was included on the digital reissue of Mayhem.)	2025	40	43	28	24	12	56	— (Note: "The Dead Dance" did not enter the NZ Top 40 Singles Chart, but peaked at number three on the NZ Hot Singles Chart.)	17	13	13	BPI: Silver; SNEP: Platinum	Mayhem
"Runway" (with Doechii)	2026	50	90	36	—	—	—	— (Note: "Runway" did not enter the NZ Top 40 Singles Chart, but peaked at number 5 on the NZ Hot Singles Chart.)	—	32	70		The Devil Wears Prada 2
"—" denotes a recording that did not chart in that territory.

=== As featured artist ===
List of singles as featured artist, with selected chart positions, showing year released and album name
Title	Year	Peak chart positions										Sales	Album
Title	Year	US	AUS	BEL (FL) Tip	CAN	GER	IRL	ITA	KOR	NZ	UK	Sales	Album
"Chillin" (Wale featuring Lady Gaga)	2009	99	29	20	73	—	19	—	—	—	12		Attention Deficit
"Video Phone" (extended remix) (Beyoncé featuring Lady Gaga)	2009	65	31	4	—	—	—	14	75	32	58	US: 280,000	I Am... Sasha Fierce
"3-Way (The Golden Rule)" (The Lonely Island featuring Justin Timberlake and Lady Gaga)	2011	— (Note: "3-Way (The Golden Rule)" did not enter the Billboard Hot 100, but peaked at number three on the Bubbling Under Hot 100 chart.)	—	—	—	—	—	—	13	—	—		The Wack Album
"Sweet Sounds of Heaven" (The Rolling Stones featuring Lady Gaga)	2023	— (Note: "Sweet Sounds of Heaven" did not enter the Billboard Hot 100, but peaked at number 29 on the US Billboard Digital Song Sales.)	—	—	— (Note: "Sweet Sounds of Heaven" did not enter the Billboard Canadian Hot 100 chart, but peaked at number 19 on the Canadian Digital Song Sales.)	84	—	—	—	— (Note: "Sweet Sounds of Heaven" did not enter the NZ Top 40 Singles Chart, but peaked at number 23 on the NZ Hot Singles Chart.)	— (Note: "Sweet Sounds of Heaven" did not enter the UK Singles Chart, but peaked at number two on the UK Sales Chart.)		Hackney Diamonds
"—" denotes items which did not chart in that country.

=== Promotional singles ===
List of promotional singles, with selected chart positions, showing year released and album name
Title	Year	Peak chart positions										Certifications	Album
Title	Year	US	AUS	CAN	FRA	GER	ITA	JPN	NZ	SWI	UK	Certifications	Album
"Beautiful, Dirty, Rich"	2008	—	—	—	—	—	—	—	—	—	83	RIAA: Gold	The Fame
"Vanity"	2008	—	—	—	—	—	—	—	—	—	—		Non-album promotional singles
"Christmas Tree" (featuring Space Cowboy)	2008	— (Note: "Christmas Tree" did not enter the Billboard Hot 100, but peaked at number 15 on the US Billboard Holiday Digital Song Sales chart.)	—	79	—	—	—	— (Note: "Christmas Tree" did not enter the Billboard Japan Hot 100, but peaked at number 18 on the Japan Digital Tracks.)	—	—	—		Non-album promotional singles
"LoveGame / Poker Face"	2009	—	—	—	—	—	—	—	—	—	—		Non-album promotional singles
"Boys Boys Boys"	2009	—	—	—	—	—	—	—	—	—	—	RIAA: Gold	The Fame
"Poker Face / Speechless / Your Song" (featuring Elton John)	2010	— (Note: "Poker Face / Speechless / Your Song" did not enter the Billboard Hot 100, but peaked at number 13 on the Bubbling Under Hot 100 chart.)	—	94	—	—	—	—	—	—	—		Non-album promotional single
"Hair"	2011	12	20	11	16	—	5	—	9	—	13		Born This Way
"Venus"	2013	32	31	19	9	35	7	—	20	18	76		Artpop
"Dope"	2013	8	34	96	8	34	5	—	20	15	124		Artpop
"Nature Boy" (with Tony Bennett)	2014	—	—	—	—	—	—	—	—	—	—		Cheek to Cheek
"Winter Wonderland" (with Tony Bennett)	2014	—	—	—	—	—	—	—	—	—	—		Non-album promotional single
"A-Yo"	2016	66	—	55	167	—	—	—	— (Note: "A-Yo" did not enter the NZ Top 40 Singles Chart, but peaked at number three on the NZ Heatseekers Singles Chart.)	62	66		Joanne
"Your Song"	2018	— (Note: "Your Song" did not enter the Billboard Hot 100, but peaked at number 21 on the US Pop Digital Song Sales.)	—	—	—	—	—	27	—	—	—		Revamp
"Sour Candy" (with Blackpink)	2020	33	8	18	62	—	46	43	12	30	17	RIAA: Gold; ARIA: Gold; BPI: Silver; MC: Gold; RMNZ: Gold	Chromatica
"Love for Sale" (with Tony Bennett)	2021	—	—	—	—	—	—	—	—	—	—		Love for Sale
"Santa Claus Is Coming to Town"	2024	—	—	—	—	—	—	— (Note: "Santa Claus Is Coming to Town" did not enter the Billboard Japan Hot 100, but peaked at number 19 on the Billboard Japan Hot Overseas chart.)	— (Note: "Santa Claus Is Coming to Town" did not enter the NZ Top 40 Singles Chart, but peaked at number 26 on the NZ Hot Singles Chart.)	—	—		Non-album promotional single
"—" denotes items which did not chart in that country.

== Other charted and certified songs ==
=== 2000s ===
List of other charted songs, with selected chart positions, showing year released and album name
Title	Year	Peak chart positions									Sales (Note: Pure sales and not equivalent units (streaming and song downloads).)	Certifications	Album
Title	Year	US	US Dance Digital	US Dance Club	AUS	CAN	HUN	NZ	SWE	UK	Sales	Certifications	Album
"The Fame"	2008	—	39	—	73	—	—	—	—	—			The Fame
"Big Girl Now" (New Kids on the Block featuring Lady Gaga)	2008	—	—	—	—	84	—	—	—	—			The Block
"Starstruck" (Note: "Starstruck" did not appear in the initial release of The Fame, it was first featured in the US edition of the album.) (featuring Space Cowboy and Flo Rida)	2008	— (Note: "Starstruck" did not enter the Billboard Hot 100, but peaked at number 7 on the Bubbling Under Hot 100 chart.)	19	—	—	74	—	—	—	191	US: 803,000	RIAA: Platinum; ARIA: Gold	The Fame
"Monster"	2009	— (Note: "Monster" did not enter the Billboard Hot 100, but peaked at number 12 on the Bubbling Under Hot 100 chart.)	20	29	80	— (Note: "Monster" did not enter the Billboard Canadian Hot 100 chart, but peaked at number 73 on the Canadian Digital Song Sales.)	6	29	—	68	US: 207,000	RIAA: Gold; ARIA: Gold; BPI: Silver; RMNZ: Gold	The Fame Monster
"Speechless"	2009	94	—	—	—	67	—	—	—	88	US: 197,000; UK: 60,000	RIAA: Gold	The Fame Monster
"So Happy I Could Die"	2009	—	35	—	—	—	10	—	53	84			The Fame Monster
"Teeth"	2009	—	—	—	—	—	—	—	—	107			The Fame Monster
"—" denotes items which did not chart in that country.

=== 2010s ===
List of other charted songs, with selected chart positions, showing year released and album name
Title	Year	Peak chart positions										Certifications	Album
Title	Year	US	US Dance Elec.	US Jazz Digital	AUS	CAN	FRA	HUN	NZ	SWE Heat	UK	Certifications	Album
"Government Hooker"	2011	—	— (Note: "Government Hooker" did not enter the Billboard Hot Dance/Electronic Songs chart, but peaked at number 16 on the Dance/Electronic Digital Song Sales.)	—	—	—	—	—	—	—	—		Born This Way
"Americano"	2011	—	— (Note: "Americano" did not enter the Billboard Hot Dance/Electronic Songs chart, but peaked at number 17 on the Dance/Electronic Digital Song Sales.)	—	—	—	—	—	—	—	—		Born This Way
"Scheiße"	2011	— (Note: "Scheiße" did not enter the Billboard Hot 100, but peaked at number 11 on the Bubbling Under Hot 100 chart.)	— (Note: "Scheiße" did not enter the Billboard Hot Dance/Electronic Songs chart, but peaked at number 6 on the Dance/Electronic Digital Song Sales.)	—	—	— (Note: "Scheiße" did not enter the Billboard Canadian Hot 100 chart, but peaked at number 72 on the Canadian Digital Song Sales.)	—	—	—	—	136		Born This Way
"Black Jesus + Amen Fashion" (Note: "Black Jesus + Amen Fashion", "Fashion of His Love", and "The Queen" were only included in the "Special" edition of Born This Way.)	2011	—	—	—	—	—	—	—	—	—	172		Born This Way
"Fashion of His Love"	2011	—	— (Note: "Fashion of His Love" did not enter the Billboard Hot Dance/Electronic Songs chart, but peaked at number 13 on the Dance/Electronic Digital Song Sales.)	—	—	—	—	—	—	—	140		Born This Way
"Highway Unicorn (Road to Love)"	2011	—	— (Note: "Highway Unicorn (Road to Love)" did not enter the Billboard Hot Dance/Electronic Songs chart, but peaked at number 27 on the Dance/Electronic Digital Song Sales.)	—	—	—	—	—	—	—	—		Born This Way
"Electric Chapel"	2011	—	— (Note: "Electric Chapel" did not enter the Billboard Hot Dance/Electronic Songs chart, but peaked at number 23 on the Dance/Electronic Digital Song Sales.)	—	—	—	—	—	—	—	—		Born This Way
"The Queen"	2011	—	—	—	—	—	—	—	—	—	150		Born This Way
"White Christmas"	2011	—	—	—	—	—	—	—	—	—	87		A Very Gaga Holiday
"Aura"	2013	—	14	—	—	—	—	—	—	—	—		Artpop
"Artpop"	2013	—	—	—	—	—	185	—	—	—	—		Artpop
"Swine"	2013	—	23	—	—	—	—	—	—	—	—		Artpop
"Donatella"	2013	—	21	—	—	—	—	—	—	—	—		Artpop
"Cheek to Cheek" (with Tony Bennett)	2014	—	—	5	—	—	—	—	—	—	—		Cheek to Cheek
"Lush Life"	2014	—	—	17	—	—	—	—	—	—	—		Cheek to Cheek
"Ev'ry Time We Say Goodbye" (Note: "Ev'ry Time We Say Goodbye" was only included in the deluxe edition of Cheek to Cheek.)	2014	—	—	12	—	—	—	—	—	—	—		Cheek to Cheek
"It Don't Mean a Thing (If It Ain't Got That Swing)" (with Tony Bennett)	2014	—	—	15	—	—	—	—	—	—	—		Cheek to Cheek
"Bang Bang (My Baby Shot Me Down)" (Note: "Bang Bang (My Baby Shot Me Down)" was only included in the iTunes Store edition of Cheek to Cheek.)	2014	—	—	1	—	—	—	—	—	—	—		Cheek to Cheek
"Diamond Heart"	2016	—	—	—	—	—	—	—	— (Note: "Diamond Heart" did not enter the NZ Top 40 Singles Chart, but peaked at number 7 on the NZ Heatseekers Singles Chart.)	—	155		Joanne
"John Wayne"	2016	—	— (Note: "John Wayne" did not enter the Billboard Hot Dance/Electronic Songs chart, but peaked at number 52 on the Dance Club Songs chart.)	—	—	—	—	34	—	—	180		Joanne
"Dancin' in Circles"	2016	—	—	—	—	—	—	—	—	—	186		Joanne
"Angel Down"	2016	—	—	—	—	—	—	—	—	—	152		Joanne
"I Want Your Love" (Nile Rodgers & Chic featuring Lady Gaga)	2018	—	39	—	—	—	—	—	—	—	— (Note: "I Want Your Love" did not enter the UK Singles Chart, but peaked at number 51 on the UK Singles Sales Chart and number 49 on the UK Singles Download Chart.)		It's About Time
"La Vie en rose"	2018	— (Note: "La Vie en Rose" did not enter the Billboard Hot 100, but peaked at number 1 on the Billboard World Digital Song Sales chart.)	—	—	—	—	—	—	—	—	—		A Star Is Born
"Music to My Eyes" (with Bradley Cooper)	2018	— (Note: "Music to My Eyes" did not enter the Billboard Hot 100, but peaked at number 17 on the US Billboard Digital Song Sales.)	—	—	—	—	—	—	— (Note: "Music to My Eyes" did not enter the NZ Top 40 Singles Chart, but peaked at number 32 on the NZ Hot Singles Chart.)	6	—	BPI: Silver; RMNZ: Gold	A Star Is Born
"Diggin' My Grave" (with Bradley Cooper)	2018	—	—	—	—	—	—	—	—	—	—	ARIA: Gold	A Star Is Born
"Look What I Found"	2018	— (Note: "Look What I Found" did not enter the Billboard Hot 100, but peaked at number 46 on the US Billboard Digital Song Sales.)	—	—	95	—	—	25	— (Note: "Look What I Found" did not enter the NZ Top 40 Singles Chart, but peaked at number 27 on the NZ Hot Singles Chart.)	5	— (Note: "Look What I Found" did not enter the UK Singles Chart, but peaked at number 93 on the UK Sales Chart and number 92 on the UK Singles Download Chart.)	ARIA: Platinum; BPI: Silver; RMNZ: Gold	A Star Is Born
"Heal Me"	2018	—	—	—	—	—	—	—	—	—	—	ARIA: Gold	A Star Is Born
"I Don't Know What Love Is" (with Bradley Cooper)	2018	—	—	—	—	—	—	—	—	—	—	ARIA: Gold	A Star Is Born
"Is That Alright?"	2018	63	—	—	96	85	—	22	— (Note: "Is That Alright?" did not enter the NZ Top 40 Singles Chart, but peaked at number 40 on the NZ Hot Singles Chart.)	—	— (Note: "Is That Alright?" did not enter the UK Singles Chart, but peaked at number 23 on the UK Singles Sales Chart and the UK Singles Download Chart.)	ARIA: Gold; BPI: Silver; RMNZ: Gold	A Star Is Born
"Before I Cry"	2018	— (Note: "Before I Cry" did not enter the Billboard Hot 100, but peaked at number 45 on the US Billboard Digital Song Sales.)	—	—	—	—	—	—	—	—	— (Note: "Before I Cry" did not enter the UK Singles Chart, but peaked at number 100 on the UK Singles Sales Chart and number 99 on the UK Singles Download Chart.)		A Star Is Born
"—" denotes items which did not chart in that country.

=== 2020s ===
List of other charted songs, with selected chart positions, showing year released and album name
Title	Year	Peak chart positions										Certifications	Album
Title	Year	US	US Dance Elec.	US Dance Pop	AUS	CAN	FRA	ITA	SWE	UK	WW	Certifications	Album
"Chromatica I"	2020	— (Note: "Chromatica I" did not enter the Billboard Hot 100, but peaked at number 25 on the Bubbling Under Hot 100 chart.)	—	—	—	—	—	—	—	—	—		Chromatica
"Alice"	2020	84	7	—	59	78	112	84	—	29	—		Chromatica
"Fun Tonight"	2020	— (Note: "Fun Tonight" did not enter the Billboard Hot 100, but peaked at number 11 on the Bubbling Under Hot 100 chart.)	12	—	91	—	199	—	—	— (Note: "Fun Tonight" did not enter the UK Singles Chart, but peaked at number 87 on the UK Singles Sales Chart and the UK Singles Download Chart, as well as at number 91 on the UK Streaming Chart.)	—		Chromatica
"Plastic Doll"	2020	— (Note: "Plastic Doll" did not enter the Billboard Hot 100, but peaked at number 17 on the Bubbling Under Hot 100 chart.)	15	—	—	—	—	—	—	—	—		Chromatica
"Enigma"	2020	— (Note: "Enigma" did not enter the Billboard Hot 100, but peaked at number 15 on the Bubbling Under Hot 100 chart.)	13	—	—	—	—	—	—	—	—		Chromatica
"Replay"	2020	— (Note: "Replay" did not enter the Billboard Hot 100, but peaked at number 21 on the Bubbling Under Hot 100 chart.)	16	—	—	—	—	—	—	—	—		Chromatica
"Chromatica III"	2020	—	—	—	—	—	—	—	—	— (Note: "Chromatica III" did not enter the UK Singles Chart, but peaked at number 16 on the UK Video Streaming Chart.)	—		Chromatica
"Sine from Above" (with Elton John)	2020	— (Note: "Sine from Above" did not enter the Billboard Hot 100, but peaked at number 16 on the Bubbling Under Hot 100 chart.)	14	—	93	—	200	—	—	— (Note: "Sine from Above" did not enter the UK Singles Chart, but peaked at number 68 on the UK Singles Sales Chart, number 59 on the UK Singles Download Chart, and number 85 on the UK Streaming Chart.)	—		Chromatica
"1000 Doves"	2020	—	18	—	—	—	—	—	—	—	—		Chromatica
"Babylon"	2020	—	17	—	—	—	—	—	—	—	—		Chromatica
"Alice" (Lsdxoxo remix)	2021	—	26	—	—	—	—	—	—	—	—		Dawn of Chromatica
"Stupid Love" (Coucou Chloe remix)	2021	—	27	—	—	—	—	—	—	—	—		Dawn of Chromatica
"Rain on Me" (with Ariana Grande; Arca remix)	2021	—	23	—	—	—	—	—	—	—	—		Dawn of Chromatica
"Free Woman" (Rina Sawayama and Clarence Clarity remix)	2021	—	20	—	—	—	—	—	—	—	—		Dawn of Chromatica
"911" (Charli XCX and A. G. Cook remix)	2021	—	14	—	—	—	—	—	—	—	—		Dawn of Chromatica
"Sour Candy" (with Blackpink; Shygirl and Mura Masa remix)	2021	—	24	—	—	—	—	—	—	—	—		Dawn of Chromatica
"Replay" (Dorian Electra remix)	2021	—	28	—	—	—	—	—	—	—	—		Dawn of Chromatica
"Sine from Above" (with Elton John; Chester Lockhart, Mood Killer, and Lil Texas remix)	2021	—	39	—	—	—	—	—	—	—	—		Dawn of Chromatica
"Babylon" (Haus Labs version)	2021	—	30	—	—	—	—	—	—	—	—		Dawn of Chromatica
"Main Titles (You've Been Called Back to Top Gun)" (with Harold Faltermeyer, Lorne Balfe, and Hans Zimmer)	2022	— (Note: "Main Titles (You've Been Called Back to Top Gun)" did not enter the Billboard Hot 100, but peaked at number 29 on the US Billboard Digital Song Sales.)	—	—	—	—	—	—	—	— (Note: "Main Titles (You've Been Called Back to Top Gun)" did not enter the UK Singles Chart, but peaked at number 27 on the UK Singles Sales Chart and number 25 on the UK Singles Download Chart.)	—		Top Gun: Maverick
"Top Gun Anthem" (with Harold Faltermeyer, Lorne Balfe, and Hans Zimmer)	2022	— (Note: "Top Gun Anthem" did not enter the Billboard Hot 100, but peaked at number 11 on the US Billboard Rock Digital Song Sales.)	—	—	—	—	—	—	—	— (Note: "Top Gun Anthem" did not enter the UK Singles Chart, but peaked at number 77 on the UK Singles Sales Chart and number 74 on the UK Singles Download Chart.)	—		Top Gun: Maverick
"The Joker"	2024	—	—	—	—	—	—	—	—	— (Note: "The Joker" did not enter the UK Singles Chart, but peaked at number 91 on the UK Singles Sales Chart and the UK Singles Download Chart.)	—		Harlequin
"Happy Mistake"	2024	—	—	—	—	—	—	—	—	— (Note: "Happy Mistake" did not enter the UK Singles Chart, but peaked at number 93 on the UK Singles Sales Chart and the UK Singles Download Chart.)	—		Harlequin
"Garden of Eden"	2025	52	—	3	77	43	82	97	92	23	31		Mayhem
"Perfect Celebrity"	2025	81	—	—	—	76	126	—	—	— (Note: "Perfect Celebrity" did not enter the UK Singles Chart, but peaked at number 94 on the UK Singles Sales Chart, number 89 on the UK Singles Download Chart, and number 65 on the UK Streaming Chart.)	67		Mayhem
"Vanish into You"	2025	61	—	4	—	53	91	—	— (Note: "Vanish into You" did not enter the Swedish Singellista Chart, but peaked at number three on the Swedish Heatseeker Chart.)	— (Note: "Vanish Into You" did not enter the UK Singles Chart, but peaked at number 86 on the UK Singles Sales Chart, number 81 on the UK Singles Download Chart, and number 46 on the UK Streaming Chart.)	38		Mayhem
"Killah" (featuring Gesaffelstein)	2025	93	—	8	—	87	194	—	—	— (Note: "Killah" did not enter the UK Singles Chart, but peaked at number 82 on the UK Streaming Chart.)	95		Mayhem
"Zombieboy"	2025	85	—	6	—	85	141	—	—	— (Note: "Zombieboy" did not enter the UK Singles Chart, but peaked at number 76 on the UK Streaming Chart.)	76		Mayhem
"LoveDrug"	2025	95	—	9	—	88	183	—	—	— (Note: "LoveDrug" did not enter the UK Singles Chart, but peaked at number 80 on the UK Singles Sales Chart and number 76 on the UK Singles Download Chart.)	103		Mayhem
"How Bad Do U Want Me"	2025	69	—	—	—	55	153	—	—	— (Note: "How Bad Do U Want Me" did not enter the UK Singles Chart, but peaked at number 32 on the UK Singles Sales Chart, number 31 on the UK Singles Download Chart, and number 64 on the UK Streaming Chart.)	52		Mayhem
"Don't Call Tonight"	2025	— (Note: "Don't Call Tonight" did not enter the Billboard Hot 100, but peaked at number 6 on the Bubbling Under Hot 100 chart.)	—	13	—	—	—	—	—	—	183		Mayhem
"Kill for Love" (Note: "Kill for Love" was included on various physical editions of Mayhem, as well as its digital reissue.)	2025	—	— (Note: "Kill for Love" did not enter the Billboard Hot Dance/Electronic Songs chart, but peaked at number eight on the Billboard Dance Digital Song Sales.)	—	—	—	—	—	—	— (Note: "Kill for Love" did not enter the UK Singles Chart, but peaked at number 96 on the UK Singles Sales Chart and number 93 on the UK Singles Download Chart.)	—		Mayhem
"Shadow of a Man"	2025	— (Note: "Shadow of a Man" did not enter the Billboard Hot 100, but peaked at number two on the Bubbling Under Hot 100 chart.)	—	11	—	91	164	—	—	— (Note: "Shadow of a Man" did not enter the UK Singles Chart, but peaked at number 42 on the UK Singles Sales Chart, number 41 on the UK Singles Download Chart, and number 93 on the UK Streaming Chart.)	85		Mayhem
"The Beast"	2025	— (Note: "The Beast" did not enter the Billboard Hot 100, but peaked at number 22 on the Bubbling Under Hot 100 chart.)	—	—	—	—	—	—	—	—	—		Mayhem
"Shape of a Woman"	2026	— (Note: "Shape of a Woman" did not enter the US Billboard Hot 100, but peaked at number 14 on the US Billboard Digital Song Sales.)	— (Note: "Shape of a Woman" did not enter the Billboard Hot Dance/Electronic Songs chart, but peaked at number 5 on the Billboard Dance Digital Song Sales.)	—	—	—	—	—	—	— (Note: "Shape of a Woman" did not enter the UK Singles Chart, but peaked at number 18 on the UK Singles Sales Chart and number 17 on the UK Singles Download Chart.)	—		The Devil Wears Prada 2
"Glamorous Life"	2026	—	—	—	—	—	—	—	—	— (Note: "Glamorous Life" did not enter the UK Singles Chart, but peaked at number 40 on the UK Singles Sales Chart and number 37 on the UK Singles Download Chart.)	—		The Devil Wears Prada 2
"—" denotes items which did not chart in that country.

== See also ==
- List of songs recorded by Lady Gaga
- List of best-selling music artists
- List of best-selling singles
  - List of best-selling singles by country
- List of best-selling albums of the 21st century
- List of best-selling albums by women
- List of artists who have achieved simultaneous number-one single and album in the United States
