= Joint German – British airship expedition to New Guinea =

Prior to World War I, the island of New Guinea was controlled by three European powers: Germany, Great-Britain, and the Netherlands.

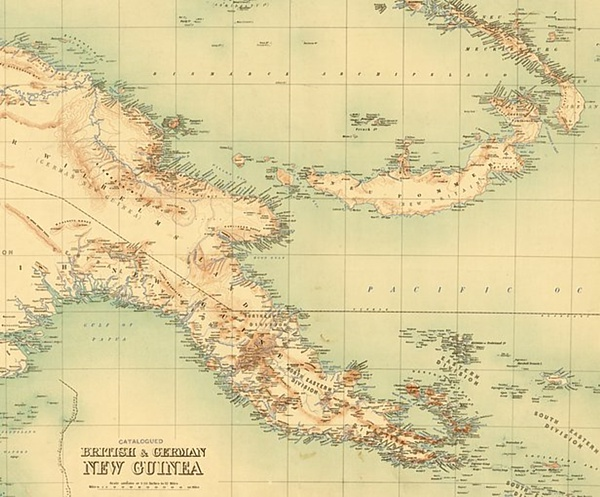
New Guinea before World War I

Although all the three powers had claims concerning the entirety of the territory, very little of the land had actually been explored. The interior of the island was one of the most inhospitable places on Earth, and the colonial powers confined their settlements primarily to the coastal plains.

== First notice April 1911 ==
In April 1911, Dr Wegener passed by Sydney, Australia, in the vessel Apia, whilst en route to his appointment as director of the Meteorological Observatory in Apia. He announced that he was on his way to German New Guinea, to make preliminary arrangements for a series of journeys by airship across the mainland, the purpose of which was to make aerial surveys.

== Official planning ==
In 1913, the three colonial powers began planning for a joint expedition to New Guinea with the purpose of exploring and mapping the interior of the island via airship. However, the Dutch backed out of the project at its very beginning. Nonetheless, the Germans and English continued on to schedule a planned expedition. The voyage was postponed to 1914. The project assembled a joint British-German crew for the airship, with scientists from both countries. The selected commander was to be Lt Paul Graetz, a German officer who had been the first man to drive across Africa in an automobile.

== Audacity of the plan ==
The proposal was considered audacious by the press of the time. The crew planned to fly across the virtually unexplored New Guinea mainland and survey Dutch, German and British territories. The longest planned flight would be of 800 kilometres, from the Gulf of Papua in a north-westerly direction, and would take an estimated three days and three nights to complete.

In the words of the would-be commander of the expedition, Paul Graetz, at that point, all lands and seas on Earth had been surveyed, except for large parts of New Guinea which were still unknown, Millions of marks had been expended on protracted land expeditions such as the Sepik River explorations. Much cheaper, and speedier, results could be obtained by photomechanical means from the air. Two special cameras sited 70 metres apart would be installed on the airship that would be employed. Vertical and oblique photographs would be taken by both cameras simultaneously, so that maps could later be produced at any desired scale. Aerial surveys would be much superior to land surveys using theodolites and other conventional surveying instruments.

== Failure of the project ==
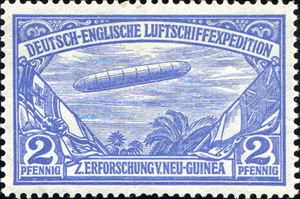
German British Joint New Guinea Expedition Stamp

Although there were no technical reason why this project could not have succeeded, the expedition did not take place. The concentration of talent and experience behind the planning was formidable. However, there was an unforeseeable variable in between: The Airship Expedition was scheduled for the second half of 1914. Exactly the period of time when World War I broke out. In August Germany was at war with Great-Britain and Zeppelin dirigibles were being used to drop bombs on British cities. Had the project succeeded, it would have transformed the process of surveying in New Guinea. But it was not to be.

== Stamp issuing ==
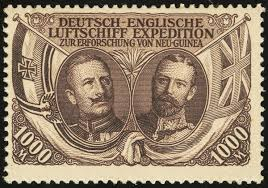
Stamp commemorating the joint New Guinea Zeppelin Expedition

Concerning the financial support of the expedition, a series of stamps was printed beginning in July 1913 These stamps are considered cinderellas, as they were not valid for postage, but could be purchased as collector's items or for use with valid postage. The stamps never made it into widespread circulation, and are considered rare.
