= Rainbow of Love =

Rainbow of Love may refer to:

- "Rainbow of Love", a song on Bob Sinclar's 2012 album Disco Crash
- "Rainbow of Love", a hymn written by Marion W. Easterling in 1942
