= Luther G. Presley =

American songwriter and composer

- Born: March 6, 1887; Beckett Mountain, Faulkner County, Arkansas
- Died: December 6, 1974 (aged 87); White County, Arkansas
- Resting place: St. Mary's Cemetery, Rose Bud, Arkansas
- Occupation: Musician/Songwriter
- Years active: 1901-1974
- Employer(s): Stamps-Baxter Music and Printing Company
- Notable work: "I'd Rather Have Jesus," "Getting Ready to Leave This World," "Shouting Time In Heaven"

Luther G. Presley (March 6, 1887 – December 6, 1974) was a songwriter, musician, and Southern gospel music composer who is credited with writing more than 1,100 hymns.

== Biography ==
Luther G. Presley was born on Beckett Mountain in Faulkner County, Arkansas on March 6, 1887. He studied music beginning at the age of 14, where he excelled. He soon became choir director. He wrote his first song, "Gladly Sing," when he was 17. He furthered his study in singing and music, under renowned teachers. His first song was published in the Showalter-Patton Company songbook in 1907.

Presley married Julia Magdaline "Maggie" Yingling of Clay, Arkansas in 1911. Together they had two sons before Maggie and their third child, another son, died in childbirth in 1922. In late 1923, Presley married Rena Henderson of Faulkner County. Henderson was also a songwriter who wrote many works of her own as well as authoring stories for children. The couple had one child together.

From 1928 until early 1930, Presley edited songbooks and was in charge of the mailing department for the Hartford Music Company in Hartford, Arkansas. He also worked fourteen years for the Central Music Company of Little Rock, Arkansas. However, he is most closely associated with the Stamps-Baxter Music and Printing Company, with whom Presley worked for the majority of his professional life spanning from 1930 until his death in 1974. Presley composed hymns for Stamps-Baxter while running a music supply store out of his home in Pangburn, Arkansas.

At the time of his death, Presley was working for the Stamps-Baxter Music and Printing Company. He is buried at St. Mary's Cemetery near Rose Bud, Arkansas. For the decade following his death, his wife continued to operate the Stamps-Baxter Music store out of their home in Pangburn.

== Work ==
Luther Presley is alleged to have written the lyrics for the song "When the Saints Go Marching In" in 1937 with Virgil O. Stamps however this is unlikely to be true as the song was an African American Spiritual (music) and numerous recordings of this song exist from the 1920s and early 1930s.

Presley told friends that he believed his best song was "I'd Rather Have Jesus," which has been translated into a number of languages. Other works for which he is known include "God's Wonderful Book Divine," "Getting Ready to Leave This World," "In Mother's Way," "I'll Have a New Body," and "He Wills It So." Many of Presley's hymns were directly inspired by events in his life, including an automobile accident which inspired "The Lord Is with Me" and the return of his two eldest sons from Europe at the conclusion of the Second World War which inspired "Give Them Red Roses (The Boys Will Be Coming Home)."

Luther Presley was inducted into the Southern Gospel Music Association Hall of Fame in 2008. Many of his songs and hymnbooks are preserved in archives at the University of Central Arkansas.

== See also ==
- Jazz funeral
