= Lady Gaga in Harlequin Live: One Night Only =

- Promotional poster
- Directed by: mtla.studio
- Produced by: Lady Gaga; Michael Polansky
- Starring: Lady Gaga
- Cinematography: Marcell Rév
- Music by: Lady Gaga
- Production company: Morningview Productions
- Release dates: December 18, 2025 (Los Angeles); December 24, 2025 (Online)
- Running time: 51 minutes
- Country: United States
- Language: English

Lady Gaga in Harlequin Live: One Night Only is a concert film by American singer Lady Gaga, documenting the live debut of her 2024 album Harlequin. The film was recorded on September 30, 2024, during an intimate, fan-exclusive performance at The Belasco in Los Angeles. Gaga and Michael Polansky acted as co-executive producers.

Staged in a dimly lit, disheveled apartment set inspired by a photoshoot for Harlequin, the special follows Gaga through multiple costume changes as she performs the album's tracklist in order. The film premiered at the Grammy Museum on December 18, 2025, and was released online via Gaga's YouTube channel on December 24, 2025. Critics praised the intensity of Gaga's performance and the striking visual style shaped by Marcell Rév's cinematography.

== Background and release ==
On September 27, 2024, Gaga released Harlequin (2024), a concept album conceived as a companion project for the musical psychological thriller film Joker: Folie à Deux (2024), in which she portrays the DC Comics character Harley Quinn opposite Joaquin Phoenix as the Joker. The album consists primarily of reinterpretations of American jazz standards, alongside two original compositions written by Gaga, "Happy Mistake" and "Folie à Deux". On September 30, 2024, Gaga performed it in full during an intimate one-off concert at The Belasco in Los Angeles, a performance that later served as the basis for the concert film. (Note: The only track performed during the event that was not from Harlequin was "Die with a Smile"; however, it is not included in the concert film.) The event commenced after midnight, attended exclusively by fans who had received invitations.

According to Gaga, the gig was initially planned as a brief three-song set following the premier of Joker: Folie à Deux, but the scope of the performance was expanded only days beforehand to include the full album. She explained that the change was possible because she had already fully internalized the material, having rehearsed the arrangements extensively prior to the show. The concert ultimately received only limited rehearsal and was conceived to preserve a sense of emotional rawness and spontaneity, which she described as the culmination of years of preparation rather than a heavily staged production.

After the recording, the film was deliberately delayed to allow what Gaga described as the "lore" of the Belasco performance to develop among fans before the footage was made public. The concert film debuted at the Grammy Museum in Los Angeles on December 18, 2025, accompanied by a public discussion about the project. On December 23, 2025, a trailer video was shared online, featuring Gaga performing "Happy Mistake" and "That's Life". The following day, the concert film was released on Gaga's YouTube channel, at 4 p.m. PT. Gaga considered the project a Christmas gift for her fans and felt that "by Harlequin standards, Christmas is the perfect time to release something rebellious."

== Production ==
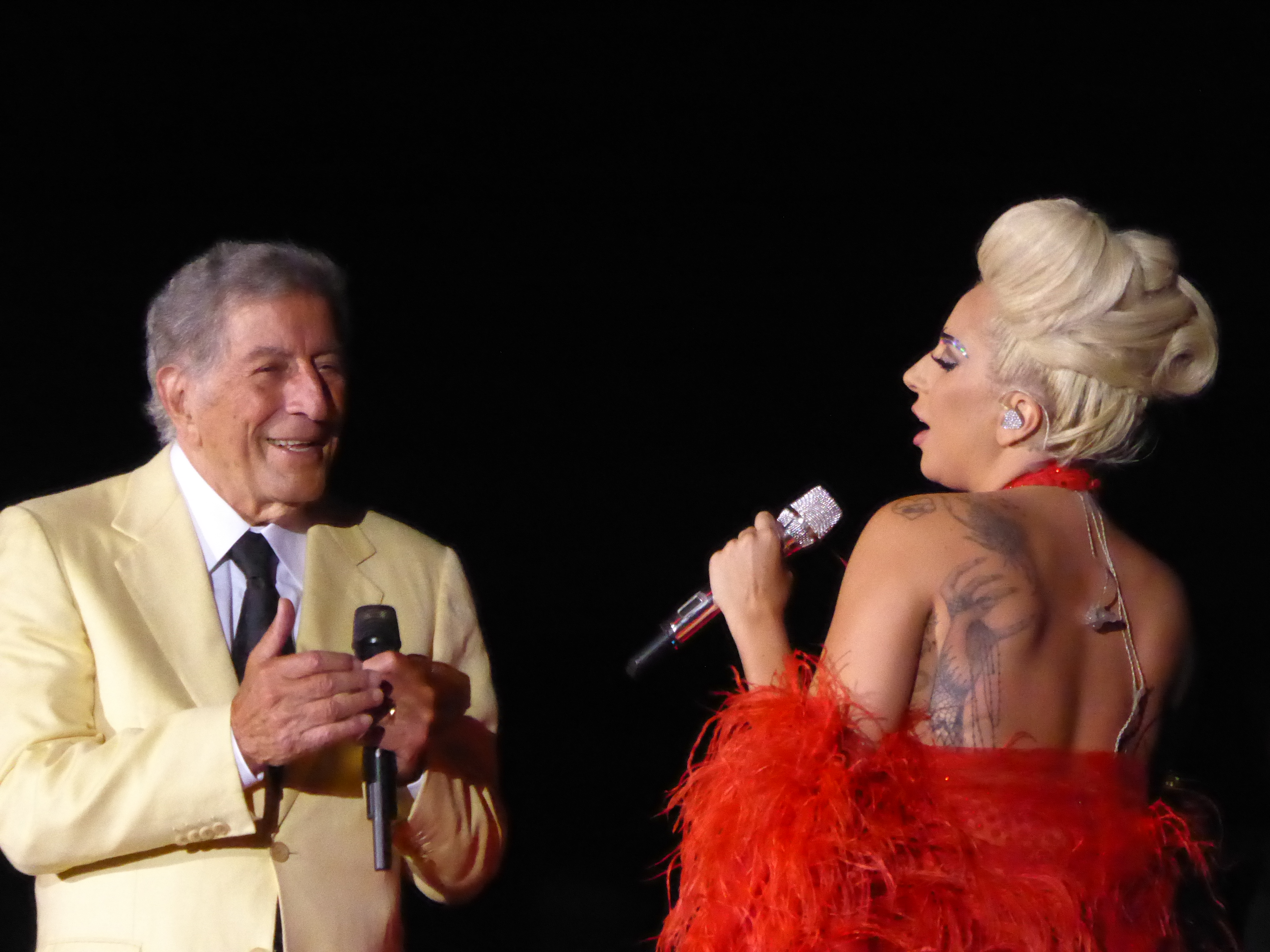
While the special saw Gaga embracing a different, more raw approach than her previous jazz work, she included a tribute to longtime duet partner Tony Bennett (pictured with Gaga in 2015).

The film was produced under Gaga's Morningview Production banner, with her and Michael Polansky serving as executive producers. The creative direction was handled by Todd Tourso and Mel Roy, along with Gaga and Polansky. Marcell Rév served as cinematographer, while musical direction was credited to Gaga alongside her band members Brian Newman, Tim Stewart, and Alex Smith. Rév previously worked with Gaga on the music video for the single "Disease" (2024), and she brought him back for this project, describing him as an "incredible artist".

The production design for the filmed performance was inspired by a photo shoot created for the Harlequin album artwork. The stage was conceived as a dimly lit, disheveled apartment setting, featuring crooked venetian blinds, shadowy lighting, and an unmade mattress placed on the floor. Gaga explained that the visual concept drew on memories of her early years as a developing artist, when she lived in similar apartment settings and first formulated many of her creative ideas. She stated that the visual approach emerged alongside the late decision to perform the album in full and was developed in close collaboration with Polansky. Gaga emphasized that the intention was to create an environment that reflected the emotional and raw qualities of the music, rather than the polished aesthetic associated with her previous jazz-oriented projects. This less formal, more visceral approach to the Great American Songbook was also reflected in small details, including a band member performing in a sleeveless tuxedo that revealed his tattoos.

Despite this departure from her earlier jazz work, Gaga included a tribute to Tony Bennett with a performance of "Smile", a song he performed frequently throughout his career. Bennett, who passed away in 2023, had been Gaga's longstanding duet partner for jazz music; they collaborated on two studio albums (Note: Cheek to Cheek (2014) and Love for Sale (2021).) and embarked on a joint tour together.

== Synopsis ==
The special opens with Gaga peeking out from behind the curtain, wearing a bob hairstyle, before beginning the performance with "Good Morning". She is joined by a barbershop quartet dressed in boater hats and striped The Music Man-like outfits. Following this prelude, the show is organized into compact two- and three-song acts in which Gaga and her six-piece band – featuring trumpet, trombone, saxophone, acoustic piano, upright bass, and electric guitar – shift fluidly between scat-based vocals, brisk jazz arrangements, and sudden turns into rock and funk textures. These acts are accompanied by four costume changes by Gaga, including a white lace blouse, a simple shift dress, a distressed ballerina-inspired outfit, and a Renaissance-style harlequin ruffle. She performs the songs in the order they appear on the Harlequin album.

The staging is deliberately disordered and shadowy, with a worn mattress as a recurring set piece. Gaga is shown jumping on it, and at other points tearing open pillows and scattering feathers. She also interacts with a small rag doll prop, occasionally picking it up and using it as a performing partner. During "Smile", performed on the mattress, the camera briefly shows a small black-and-white television at the foot of the bed looping footage of Tony Bennett, while Gaga remains lying under the covers as she sings. "Happy Mistake" is captured almost entirely in a single continuous take – aside from the first 30 seconds – with the camera rotating around Gaga as she sings. She plays piano for portions of the special, sometimes dances atop the instrument, and picks up an electric guitar for a performance.

== Reception and interpretation ==
Johnny Loftus from Decider opined that the film reinvigorates Gaga's connection to the jazz standards-inspired Harlequin material and successfully channels the energy of her large-scale tours into a smaller, more intimate setting. He also praised Marcell Rév's cinematography, noting that it turns the stage's spatial limitations into a visual strength, blending elements of urban decay from the Joker films with Gaga's theatricality, while highlighting the production's darker corners. Loftus considered the result a woozy, drunken cabaret atmosphere that subtly incorporates gothic imagery reminiscent of Mayhem, Gaga's 2025 pop record.

Writing for Variety, Chris Willman described the concert as "utterly bonkers" and wrote that Gaga appeared to be having "the manic time of her life," calling it one of the most compelling performances of her career. He noted that the show drew on the best of mid-century Broadway and movie musicals while remaining delightfully unpredictable and genre-defying, giving it a slight edge over her Jazz & Piano residency in Las Vegas (2018–2024) by feeling more inherently Gaga-esque rather than a nostalgic cosplay. Willman observed that the concert occasionally conveyed a punk sensibility through its set, energy, and Gaga's unhinged performance style, while her singing remained "flawless" throughout.

Willman further suggested that the cluttered, rundown apartment set might initially resemble the hideout of Gaga's Joker: Folie à Deux character, particularly for viewers who had not yet seen the film she had just premiered. However, he argued that full-on "insanity" was not the intended concept; Gaga paused mid-show to explain that the performance focused on reconnecting with the raw joy of making music before career pressures dulled it. In this context, the chaotic set functions as a visual metaphor for an artist so consumed by creative intensity that everyday concerns fade into the background. Willman concluded that the set design added an ironic and intriguing dimension that would not have been present with a conventional backdrop.

== Credits and personnel ==
Credits and personnel adapted from the concert special program.

Primary Credits

- Lady Gaga – creator, executive producer, creative direction, musical direction, lead vocals
- Michael Polansky – executive producer, creative direction
- Todd Tourso – creative direction
- Mel Roy – creative direction
- mtla.studio – directing
- Marcell Rév – director of photography
- Bill Malina – mixing, recording engineer
- Bobby Campbell – co-producer
- Ryan Hahn – film executive producer
- Tom O'Connell – film head of production
- Roisin Moloney – film producer
- Janelle Lee – film production manager
- Ernie Gilbert – editor
- Carina Mak – post producer

Band

- Brian Newman – band leader, trumpet
- Steve Kortyka – saxophone
- Alex Smith – piano
- Tim Stewart – guitar
- Daniel Foose – bass
- Donald Barrett – drums

Barbershop Quartet (Sunday Night Social)

- Tyler Wigginton
- Ashley Wigginton
- Tim Brooks
- Seth Fetzer
