= WKLF =

- Clanton, Alabama; United States
- Frequency: 1000 kHz
- Branding: The Peach

Programming
- Format: Southern Gospel - Oldies

Ownership
- Owner: WKLF LLC

History
- First air date: November 2, 1947

Technical information
- Licensing authority: FCC
- Facility ID: 61222
- Class: D
- Power: 1,000 watts (days only)
- Transmitter coordinates: 32°49′55″N 86°41′36″W
- Translator: 95.5 W238CS (Clanton)

Links
- Public license information: Public file; LMS
- Webcast: Listen live (Southern gospel); Listen live (Oldies)
- Website: www.wklfradio.com

WKLF (1000 AM, "The Peach") is a radio station licensed to Clanton, Alabama. The station is owned by WKLF LLC and it airs a Southern gospel and oldies format. The studios and offices are on Alabama State Route 22 in Clanton.

WKLF is a daytimer station powered at 1,000 watts. AM 1000 is a clear channel frequency. To avoid interference with other stations, at night WKLF must go off the air. Programming continues around the clock on 250-watt FM translator W238CS at 95.5 MHz.

== History ==
While it was still a construction permit, the station was assigned the WKLF call letters by the Federal Communications Commission on March 4, 1947. WKLF signed on the air on November 2, 1947. It originally broadcast on 980 AM.

WKLF added an FM station at 97.7 MHz in 1953. That station today is WRYD in Jemison. In the 1960s and 70s, they were owned by the Southern Broadcasting Company.

Marion W. Easterling once hosted a Southern Gospel radio show on WKLF.
