= Bo Weavil Jackson =

American singer-guitarist

- Also known as: Sam Butler
- Born: probably James Jackson; Unknown
- Died: Unknown
- Genres: Blues; Gospel
- Occupation: Musician
- Instruments: Vocal; Guitar

Bo Weavil Jackson (dates and places of birth and death unknown) was an American blues singer and guitarist. He was one of the first country bluesmen to be recorded, in 1926, for Paramount Records and Vocalion Records. On the latter label he was credited as Sam Butler, which has become the name most commonly used to identify him. His 78-rpm records are highly sought by collectors and have been re-released on numerous LP and CD compilation albums. His technique is distinctive for its upbeat tempo, varied melodic lines, and impromptu instrumentals.

It is widely believed that Jackson was active in Birmingham, Alabama, since he referred to that area in his lyrics, and because that was apparently where the talent scouts found him performing on the street, but he was promoted as originating from North Carolina. According to Eugene Chadbourne, Paramount promoted him as having "come down from the Carolinas". Apart from his 1926 recordings, no further documentation of him exists.

His recordings have been published in both notation and tablature transcriptions, which have enabled contemporary detailed study of his style and technique.

== Recordings ==
As Bo Weavil Jackson, circa September 1926, in Chicago, Illinois

- "You Can't Keep No Brown" / "Pistol Blues", Paramount 12389
- "When the Saints Come Marching Home" / "I'm on My Way to the Kingdom Land", Paramount 12390
- "Why Do You Moan" / "Some Scream High Yellow", Paramount 12423

As Sam Butler, September 30, 1926, in New York City

- "You Can't Keep No Brown" / "Devil and My Brown Blues", Vocalion 1055 (unreleased)
- "Heaven Is My View" / "Christians Fight On (Your Time Ain't Long)", Vocalion 1056
- "Poor Boy Blues" / "Jefferson County Blues", Vocalion 1057

== Compilations ==
- Bo Weavil Jackson (Sam Butler) 1926, Complete Recordings in Chronological Order (Matchbox, 1982)
- Backwoods Blues (1926–1935): The Complete Recorded Works in Chronological Order of Sam Butler (Bo Weavil Jackson), Bobby Grant, King Solomon Hill, Lane Hardin (Document, 1991)
