= J. R. Baxter =

American Southern Gospel composer and publisher

- Born: Jesse Randall Baxter, Jr. December 8, 1887; DeKalb County, Alabama, U.S.
- Died: January 29, 1960 (aged 72); Dallas, Texas, U.S.
- Other name: Pap
- Known for: Christian music

Jesse Randall Baxter Jr. (December 8, 1887 – January 29, 1960) was an American Southern Gospel composer and publisher. He was sometimes referred to as “Pa” or "Pap". He has been in the Gospel Music Hall of Fame since 1973.

== Biography ==
J. R. Baxter was born on December 8, 1887, in Lebanon, Alabama in Dekalb County. He was a farmer and married Clarice Howard in 1918.

He studied with Thomas B. Mosley and Anthony Johnson Showalter, and in 1926 bought a stake in Virgil O. Stamps' gospel music publishing company. The Stamps-Baxter Music & Printing Company became one of the leading publishers of gospel songs in the early 20th century. Baxter ran the company's Chattanooga, Tennessee, office until Stamps's death in 1940; following this Baxter moved to Dallas, Texas, to run the main office. He ran the company until his death.

Baxter's interest in school teaching led him to publish shape-note songbooks and sponsor a Stamps-Baxter School of Music, both of which contributed to the popularity of Gospel music.

Baxter also composed Gospel songs himself; his works include "Try Jesus", "Travel the Sunlit Way", "Something Happens (When You Give Your Heart to God)", "I Have Peace in My Soul", "Living Grace", and "I Want to Help Some Weary Pilgrim".

He died on January 21, 1960.

== Legacy ==
After Baxter's death, his wife continued to run the business until she died, after which it was sold to Zondervan. In 1973, he was inducted into the Gospel Music Hall of Fame. In 1997, Baxter was inducted into the Southern Gospel Music Association Hall of Fame along with his wife Clarice. In 2001, he was inducted into the Alabama Music Hall of Fame.
