= Michael Polansky =

American entrepreneur (born 1983)

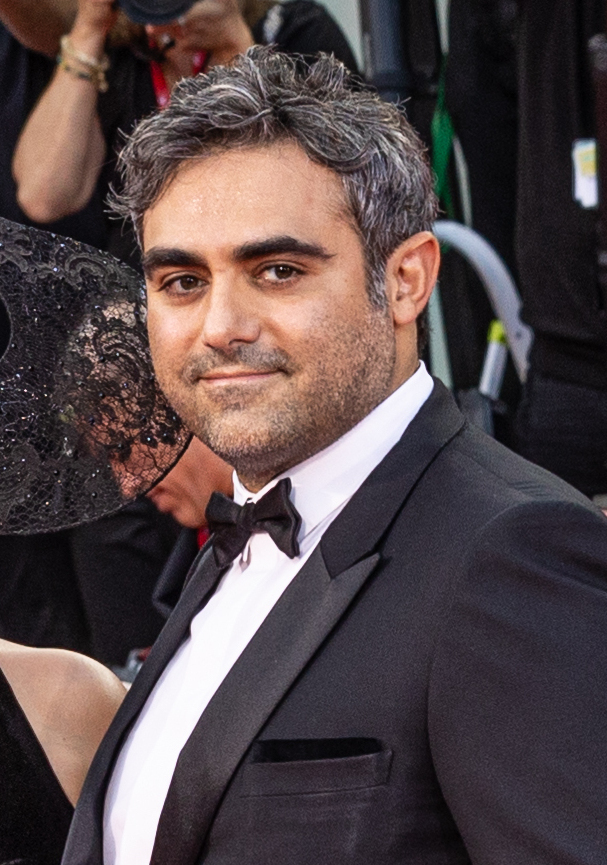
- Polansky in 2024
- Born: Michael Woods Polansky; September 26, 1983 (age 43); Minnesota, U.S.
- Education: Harvard University
- Occupation: Executive director of Parker Foundation
- Board member of: Haus Labs; Parker Institute for Cancer Immunotherapy
- Partner: Lady Gaga (eng. 2024)
- Children: 1

Michael Woods Polansky (born September 26, 1983) is an American entrepreneur, venture capitalist, music producer, and songwriter. He is engaged to Lady Gaga and has co-written various songs with her.

== Early life and education ==
Polansky was born in Minnesota on September 26, 1983 to Steven Polansky and Ellen Woods. He studied applied mathematics and computer science at Harvard University and graduated in 2006.

His father, Steven Polansky, is an American author of Jewish background.

== Career ==
Polansky is founder or co-founder of the companies Avos Capital Management, Hawktail, and Outer Biosciences. He is a board member of Parker Institute for Cancer Immunotherapy and Lady Gaga's cosmetics brand Haus Labs. Polansky is the executive director of the Parker Foundation, which he co-founded with Sean Parker in 2015. He has also been the chief operating officer of Airtime.com, which was founded by Parker and Shawn Fanning in 2011. Polansky has been involved in other projects by Parker.

Polansky was a co-executive producer of Lady Gaga's 2024 soundtrack album Harlequin and co-wrote and reworked the traditional songs "Get Happy", "Good Morning", "If My Friends Could See Me Now", and "Oh, When the Saints". He also has writing and production credits on Lady Gaga's 2025 studio album Mayhem, including "The Beast", "Blade of Grass", "Disease", "Don't Call Tonight", "How Bad Do U Want Me", "LoveDrug", and "Vanish into You". He and Lady Gaga also co-wrote the original song "All I Need Is Time". In addition, he co-produced the Mayhem Ball, Gaga's 2025–2026 world tour, and the music video for her 2026 single "Runway".

== Personal life ==
Polansky is based in San Francisco, as of 2024. As of 2025, he is engaged to Lady Gaga. The couple started dating in 2020. When he asked how he should propose to her, she suggested using a blade of grass, which inspired her song of the same name on Mayhem.

== Songs written ==
All songs written by Polansky and Gaga, with the other writers listed below.

List of songs co-written
Song	Performer(s)	Co-writer(s)	Album	Year	Ref(s).
"Good Morning"	Lady Gaga	Nacio Herb Brown; Arthur Freed	Harlequin	2024	
"Get Happy" (2024)	Lady Gaga	Harold Arlen; Ted Koehler	Harlequin	2024	
"Oh, When the Saints"	Lady Gaga	Traditional	Harlequin	2024	
"If My Friends Could See Me Now"	Lady Gaga	Cy Coleman; Dorothy Fields	Harlequin	2024	
"All I Need Is Time"	Lady Gaga	—N/a	Unreleased	2025	
"Disease"	Lady Gaga	Andrew Watt; Henry Walter	Mayhem	2025	
"Vanish into You"	Lady Gaga	Andrew Watt; Henry Walter	Mayhem	2025	
"LoveDrug"	Lady Gaga	Andrew Watt; Henry Walter	Mayhem	2025	
"How Bad Do U Want Me"	Lady Gaga	Andrew Watt; Henry Walter	Mayhem	2025	
"Don't Call Tonight"	Lady Gaga	Andrew Watt; Henry Walter	Mayhem	2025	
"The Beast"	Lady Gaga	Andrew Watt; Henry Walter	Mayhem	2025	
"Blade of Grass"	Lady Gaga	Andrew Watt; Mike Lévy	Mayhem	2025	
"Glamorous Life"	Lady Gaga	Andrew Watt; Henry Walter	The Devil Wears Prada 2	2026	

== See also ==
- List of Harvard University people
