= Virgil Oliver Stamps =

American music publisher (1892–1940)

Virgil Oliver Stamps (1892–1940) was a shape note promoter, singer, composer, and singing school teacher. He was the first to promote southern-style gospel singing across America using radio and published the most song books in America for decades.

== Biography ==
V. O. Stamps was born in and raised in the Stamps Community in Upshur County, Texas, and was a key individual in early gospel music publishing. As a youth, he worked with his father in a sawmill, and used his earnings to purchase every gospel songbook he could find. In 1907 he attended the singing school of Richard M. Morgan. Sometime after that, his father bought a small store and V. O. worked there while teaching singing schools until 1914.

In 1914 he became a field representative for the James D. Vaughan Music Company of Lawrenceburg, Tennessee. Stamps worked for the Tennessee Music Company, Samuel Beazley and J. D. Vaughan from 1914–24, including singing in a quartet representing the Vaughan company. Around 1915 he composed his first song, entitled "The Man Behind the Plow”. Stamps also had organized a gospel quartet in 1924 with his younger brother Frank Stamps called The Frank Stamps All-Star Quartet (or Stamps Quartet) in which he sang bass.

In 1924 he founded the V. O. Stamps Music Company in Jacksonville, Texas. In that year the first session of the V. O. Stamps School of Music was held, with a faculty that included Thomas Benton, C. C. Stafford, R. B. Vaughan, and Otis Deaton. They became the largest developer of gospel singers in the south for decades. In 1924 he published Harbor Bells - his first song book. In 1927, with J. R. Baxter, Stamps formed the Stamps-Baxter Music Company, based in Dallas, Texas. By the late 1930’s, it published the most shape note songbooks in America.

He was a pioneer is the use of radio for promoting Southern gospel music and quartet singing. Radio station KRLD gave the Stamps-Baxter Quartet a daily show in 1936, after a large response from their radio performance at the Texas Centennial Exposition. They also had a regular program on WFFA. At one point they represented over 100 quartets on radio stations across America. Frank Stamps would leave the quartet in 1945 to start his own Stamps Quartet Music Company, creating some confusion.

V.O. Stamps died in 1940.

== Work ==
Virgil Stamps wrote the music and melody for the famous gospel song "When the Saints Go Marching In", in 1937, while Luther G. Presley wrote the lyrics.

Among the songs written by V. O. Stamps are "Love Is the Key," "Singing on My Way," and "I Am Going." V. O. Stamps was inducted into the Gospel Music Hall of Fame in 1973 along with his brother Frank Stamps. The pair were also both inducted into the Hall of Fame for the Southern Gospel Music Association in 1997 along with J.R. Baxter and his wife Clarice.

== Stamps Quartet ==
Virgil O. Stamps and Frank Stamps started The Frank Stamps All Star Quartet (also referred to as Stamps Quartet) in Gilmer, Texas in 1924 in which V.O. Stamps sang base. They were the first gospel group to record for RCA-Victor in 1927. They also recorded with Victor in Atlanta at Egleston Hall in 1932 under the direction of Ralph Peer. Frank Stamps also taught in the music school for decades before dying in 1965. The popularity of the quartet increased dramatically after the group toured with Elvis Presley from 1971-1977. The group was inducted in the Gospel Music Hall of Fame in 1998.
