= How Bad Do U Want Me =

2025 song by Lady Gaga

Song by Lady Gaga

from the album Mayhem
- Released: March 7, 2025
- Studio: Shangri-La (Malibu); Henson (Hollywood)
- Genre: Synth-pop
- Length: 3:58
- Label: Interscope
- Songwriters: Lady Gaga; Michael Polansky; Andrew Watt; Henry Walter
- Producers: Lady Gaga; Andrew Watt; Cirkut

Official audio
- "How Bad Do U Want Me" on YouTube

"How Bad Do U Want Me" is a song by American singer and songwriter Lady Gaga from her studio album Mayhem (2025). It was written and produced by Gaga, Andrew Watt, and Cirkut, with additional songwriting contributions from Michael Polansky. A synth-pop track, it has drawn comparisons to the pop-driven style of Taylor Swift. The lyrics explore the tension between Lady Gaga's public "bad girl" persona and her private self, examining desire, stereotypes, and the expectations placed on her image.

Several music critics praised "How Bad Do U Want Me" for its production, energy, and chorus, highlighting Gaga's distinctive style and playful charm, while others were more critical, viewing the track as derivative of Swift's pop sound and less original than her usual work. Commercially, it achieved minor chart placements in several countries following the release of Mayhem. Gaga performed the song live on multiple occasions, including her 2025 promotional concerts—where she walked along the runway in a Victorian-style outfit—and as the encore of The Mayhem Ball tour (2025–2026), during which the camera followed her as she returned from backstage in casual clothing after removing her makeup. She also performed a reimagined version of the song for Mayhem Requiem.

== Production and release ==
In an interview with Las Culturistas, Lady Gaga revealed that she began writing "How Bad Do U Want Me" on her own at home, before being joined by her fiancé Michael Polansky. Polansky was interested in the song's lyrical content, asking whether she is singing about him, which she denied. The two finished the track with Andrew Watt and Cirkut, who both additionally produced it alongside Gaga. Paul Lamalfa recorded the track at Shangri-La Studios in Malibu, California and Henson Recording Studios in Hollywood, Los Angeles; Marco Sonzini provided additional engineering, while Tyler Harris and Tommy Turner worked as assistant engineers. The song was mixed by Serban Ghenea at Mixstar Studios in Virginia Beach, Virginia, and mastered by Randy Merrill at Sterling Sound Studios in Edgewater, New Jersey. Gaga additionally played keyboards; Watt played drums, electric guitar, and keyboards; and Cirkut played synthesizer and keyboards and provided drum and bass programming. Bryce Bordone worked as the assistant mixing engineer, and Marc VanGool served as the studio technician.

Gaga announced her studio album Mayhem on January 27, 2025, setting its release date on March 7. Next month, she unveiled the track listing, featuring "How Bad Do U Want Me" as the album's ninth track. Gaga admitted that she almost scrapped the song from the album, stating that she gets anxious about her "super pop" tracks, pointing out that she almost removed "Just Dance" from The Fame (2008) for the same reason.

== Music and lyrics ==
"How Bad Do U Want Me" is a 1980s-inspired synth-pop song with a dreamy, prom-ballad feel. According to the sheet music published by Sony/ATV Music Publishing on Musicnotes, it is composed in the key of A♭ major and has a moderately slow tempo. The vocal range spans from A♭3 to F_{5}. Multiple journalists found the song sonically comparable to the English duo Yazoo, especially their 1982 single "Only You", with some suggesting it might have actually sampled from the band. The Arts Desk's Thomas H. Green described it as "Yazoo-goes-Europop". Writers from Pitchfork, Attitude, and Salon compared the track to music by Ally Maine, Gaga's character from A Star Is Born (2018).

Several fans and critics pointed out that "How Bad Do U Want Me" bears a strong resemblance to the pop style of Taylor Swift. Many specifically compared it to the synth-polished sound of her album 1989 (2014), (Note: Attributed to multiple sources:) and to "Gorgeous" from Reputation (2017). (Note: Attributed to multiple sources:) Others felt it echoed elements of "Snow on the Beach" and "Hits Different" from Midnights (2022)—the first because of its airy, distant background vocals, and the second due to a similar overall sonic vibe. Her Campus writer Makalah Wright added that while "Gorgeous" and Gaga's track sound alike, their lyrics entirely diverge. Fran Hoepfner of Vulture observed that while the track's "beep-boop-beep-boop" intro and nostalgic mid-2000s pop vibe evoke "Gorgeous", she ultimately found it more akin to Gaga's own "The Cure" (2017) and the Artpop (2013) track "Gypsy", noting that none of them showcase Gaga's typical sound. She wrote that "How Bad Do U Want Me" functions as a form of artifice, showcasing a version of Gaga she adopts only briefly, and stands apart from Mayhem's clubbier songs by emphasizing a pop identity that isn't truly hers, even when she experiments with it. KTLA's Russell Falcon suggested Gaga might intentionally be channeling Swift's pop sensibilities. He described it as Gaga being "haunted" by Swift—perhaps using Swift's pervasive influence as a metaphor for the trajectory Gaga's own career once seemed destined to follow, and what it means to confront that legacy artistically. Other journalists noted that the song's narrative tone and vocal delivery both bear similarities to Swift. Some fans speculated that Swift may have contributed backing vocals, though this claim was subsequently refuted.

"How Bad Do U Want Me"
A 21-second sample of the song, featuring the opening lines of the chorus in which Gaga satirizes the "bad girl" stereotype.

Discussing "How Bad Do U Want Me" on the Las Culturistas podcast, Gaga said the song reflected a feeling she had carried throughout her life: being cast as the "bad girl". She called the idea that wearing ripped jeans made a girl "bad" "silly and humorous". She also said she had long worried that her former partners actually wanted "good girls". Gaga also clarified that the song was not about her fiancé, Michael Polansky, although they had written it together. Kristen S. Hé of Vulture interpreted the lyrics as Gaga questioning whether a romantic partner sees her as Stefani Germanotta or as the public figure Lady Gaga. Hé interpreted the chorus as Gaga questioning whether her partner wants her for who she is or for the rebellious image associated with her. Samantha Olson of Cosmopolitan similarly contrasted Gaga's public persona with her private identity, noting that the second verse shifts toward the couple's physical attraction.

== Critical reception ==
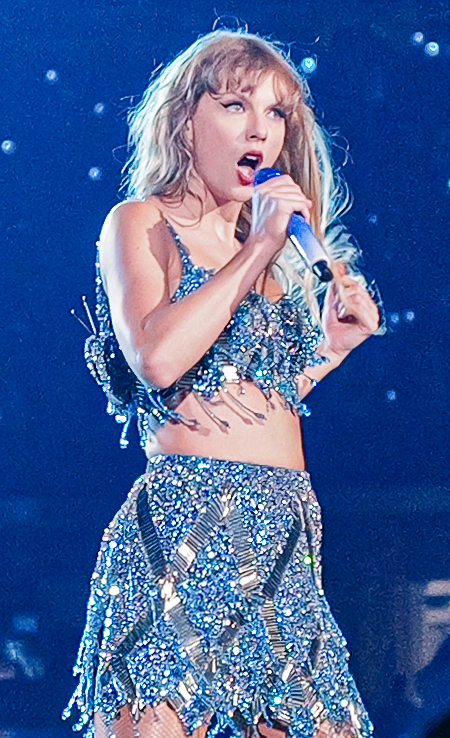
Music critics from Variety and Entertainment Weekly compared the song favorably to Taylor Swift's work, while others argued it leans too heavily on Swift's pop formula.

Ben Tipple of DIY called "How Bad Do U Want Me" a straightforward yet unmistakably Gaga track, "brimming with her distinctive energy," and praised its chorus as "another example of Gaga's skills for unfiltered earworms." CJ Thorpe-Tracey of The Quietus found the song a downtempo shift from the album's usual energy, a move that works "beautifully". Thomas Stremfel of Spectrum Culture believed it aligns more closely with Carly Rae Jepsen's melodic and thematic style than with Mayhem's lead single, "Disease"–previously the only clue to the record's potential sound–, ultimately emerging as a standout track thanks to its "big sing-along" chorus. Clash's Robin Murray felt "the electronic erotica of 'How Bad Do U Want Me' is ready to induce heart palpitations across the globe." Chris Hedden of Screen Rant suggested that the song channels the chaos of a troubled relationship into the liberating thrill of a wind-in-your-hair car ride, and with Gaga fully in her element, "How Bad Do U Want Me" is bound to become a frequent replay. Beats Per Minute praised the track for "amping up the inherent kitschiness of the era" with its "euphoric chorus" and highlighted Gaga's charm in playing a "cheeky eighties pop star who is not quite as innocent as her sweet voice suggests." Slant Magazine's Alexa Camp appreciated the production, writing that the track is "approaching something close to synth-pop splendor". Entertainment Weekly's Wesley Stenzel and Variety's Stephen J. Horowitz both found it one of the best Taylor Swift songs not actually written and recorded by Swift.

Other music critics noted that the song appears derivative of the pop aesthetics associated with Swift. Stephen Daw of Billboard found it to be the worst song of the album, thinking it "falls flat with its power-pop leanings." He compared its lyrics and instrumental to those from Swift's discography, elaborating that the song feels out of place on the "decidedly Gaga" Mayhem, and it is not in line with Gaga's vision. MusicOMH's Donovan Livesey also saw "How Bad Do U Want Me" as the album's weakest point; while enjoying it as well-produced and engaging, he found the chorus overly influenced by Swift, making Gaga seem less original than usual. Dakota West Foss of Sputnikmusic felt "How Bad Do U Want Me" is a tongue-in-cheek take at the "modern (bad) iteration of Taylor Swift's lifeless synthpop that is every bit the knockout that Gaga dropping a weight class would be – there's even a stratospheric bridge that calls 'Cruel Summer' to mind." Sydney Brasil of Exclaim! called it one of her least favorite tracks on Mayhem and suggested Gaga added it partly to "throw the Swifties a bone." Megan Lapierre from the same outlet found it "pandering" in a way she had not anticipated from Gaga, adding that she usually expects "Taylor bullshit from Taylor, but it somehow sounds even clunkier coming from Gaga." The Australian Broadcasting Corporation's Jared Richards claimed it is "more random than bad, with Gaga rarely chasing her contemporaries."

== Commercial performance ==
During the release week of Mayhem, "How Bad Do U Want Me" entered the Billboard Global 200 at number 52. It was one of twelve tracks from the album to appear on the chart, ranking as the sixth highest-charting track among them. In the United States, the song debuted at number 69 on the Billboard Hot 100, while in Canada, it entered the Canadian Hot 100 at number 55. Internationally, the song appeared on several other charts, reaching number 2 on Poland's Airplay Top 100, number 6 on New Zealand's Hot Singles chart, number 22 in Singapore (RIAS), number 44 on Greece's International IFPI chart, number 97 in Portugal (AFP), and number 153 in France (SNEP). "How Bad Do U Want Me" entered the UK charts for best-selling singles, most-downloaded singles, and most-streamed singles at lower positions. Although it did not chart in Brazil, Pro-Música Brasil awarded the song a double-platinum certification.

== Live performances ==
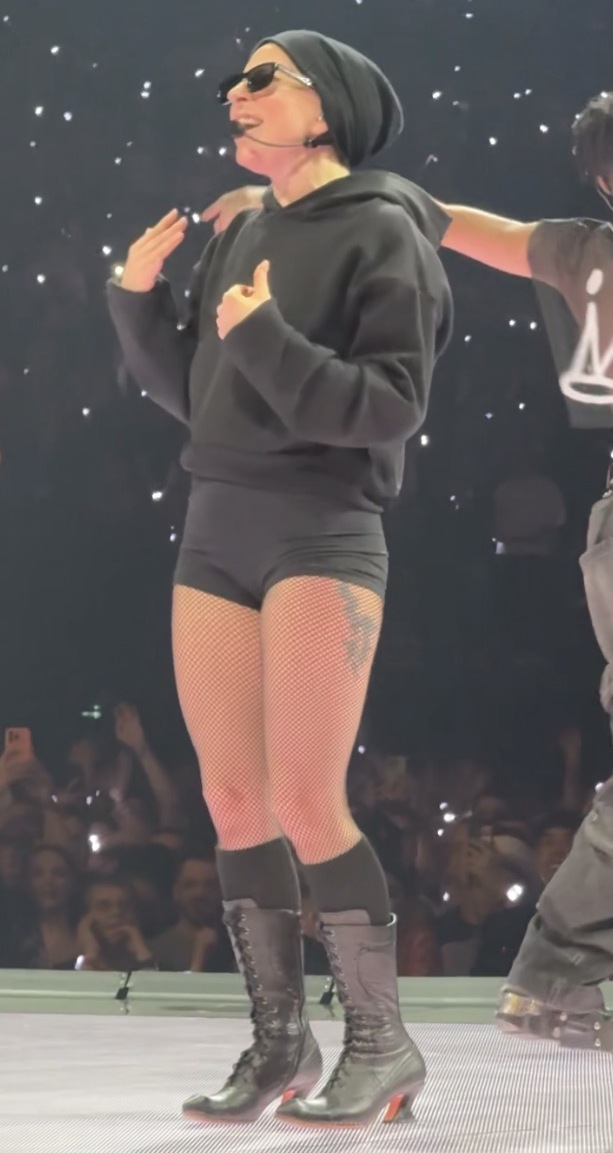
Lady Gaga performing "How Bad Do U Want Me" during the encore of The Mayhem Ball tour

Gaga first sang "How Bad Do U Want Me" live at her 2025 promotional concerts for Mayhem, which included a headlining set at Coachella. She began her performance at a skull-covered keyboard, then moved along the runway by the second verse, wearing a blue Victorian-style coat, black "Maleficent-esque" horns, and lace-up stiletto boots reminiscent of those she wore in the music video for "Rain on Me" (2020). Reviewing Gaga's performance at Copacabana beach, Correio da Manhã's Lanna Silveira wrote it was one of the few weak points of the show, as it clashed with the other songs from the setlist, and slowed the pace of the concert. On May 13, 2025, the track was part of a five-song set at the YouTube Brandcast event, held at the David Geffen Hall in New York City.

Gaga performed "How Bad Do U Want Me" as the closing song during The Mayhem Ball (2025–2026), as part of the encore. The performance featured a live backstage video feed projected on screen, showing Gaga in her dressing room backstage, wiping off her makeup with a towel and changing into casual clothing, including an oversized sweater, a beanie, and dark sunglasses, before returning to the main arena to finish the show. Billboard's Joe Lynch believed the performance "was clearly a victory lap for Mother Monster, who dropped the dramatic pretenses and simply allowed herself to exist as a human on a stage". Adam Maidment of Manchester Evening News found it a "simple, effective and a beautiful finish". The performance received journalist comparisons to Gaga's similarly makeup-free rendition of "Hold My Hand" (2022) at the 95th Academy Awards. At a few select 2026 dates of the tour, Gaga also performed the song acoustically during the piano segment of the show.

A reworked rendition of "How Bad Do U Want Me" appears on Gaga's live album and concert film Apple Music Live: Mayhem Requiem, released on May 14, 2026, and recorded at an invite-only performance at the Wiltern Theatre in Los Angeles in January 2026. The performance began with a synth-driven arrangement before shifting into a rock-oriented interpretation.

== Credits and personnel ==
Credits are adapted from the liner notes of Mayhem.

- Lady Gaga – songwriter, producer, lead vocals, background vocals, keyboards
- Andrew Watt – songwriter, producer, drums, electric guitar, keyboards
- Cirkut – songwriter, producer, synthesizer, keyboards, drum programming, bass programming
- Michael Polansky – songwriter
- Paul Lamalfa – recording engineer
- Serban Ghenea – mixing engineer
- Randy Merrill – mastering engineer
- Marco Sonzini – additional engineer
- Tyler Harris – assistant engineer
- Tommy Turner – assistant engineer
- Bryce Bordone – assistant mixing engineer
- Marc VanGool – studio technician

== Charts ==
=== Weekly charts ===
Weekly chart performance for "How Bad Do U Want Me"
Chart (2025)	Peak position
Canada Hot 100 (Billboard)	55
France (SNEP)	153
Global 200 (Billboard)	52
Greece International (IFPI)	44
New Zealand Hot Singles (RMNZ)	6
Poland (Polish Airplay Top 100)	2
Portugal (AFP)	97
Singapore (RIAS)	22
UK Singles Downloads (Official Charts)	31
UK Singles Sales (OCC)	32
UK Streaming (OCC)	64
US Billboard Hot 100	69

=== Year-end charts ===
Year-end chart performance for "How Bad Do U Want Me"
Chart (2025)	Position
Poland (Polish Airplay Top 100)	25

== Certifications ==
Certifications
Region	Certification	Certified units/sales
Brazil (Pro-Música Brasil)	2× Platinum	80,000^{‡}
Poland (ZPAV)	Gold	62,500^{‡}
^{‡} Sales+streaming figures based on certification alone.
