= Marion W. Easterling =

American composer

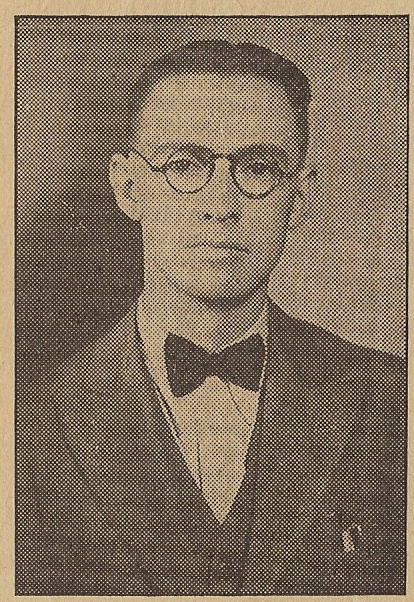
- Marion W. Easterling in 1939
- Born: March 12, 1910; Chilton County, Alabama, USA
- Died: December 10, 1989 (aged 79); Birmingham, Alabama, USA
- Occupation: Composer

Marion Wesley Easterling (March 12, 1910 - December 10, 1989) was an American music composer in the genre of southern gospel who claimed he had written around 300 songs. His compositions include "When I Wake Up To Sleep No More", "Lord Lead Me On", "Standing By The River", "Rainbow Of Love", and "When He Reached Down His Hand For Me".

== Biography ==
Marion Wesley Easterling was born in Chilton County, Alabama on March 12, 1910. He attended the public schools in Chilton County and then attended various music schools including the Vaughan School of Music. He also took correspondence courses from New York and Chicago to further his musical education. His first song to become a hit was "Lord Lead Me On" written in 1937. Other hit songs written by Easterling include "Standing By The River", "Rainbow Of Love", "When He Reached Down His Hand For Me", and "When I Wake Up To Sleep No More". In 1938, Easterling was the youngest composer to sign a five-year contract with Stamps-Baxter Music Company.

Easterling also brought gospel music through the media of radio to Chilton County. He hosted a morning gospel show "America's Favorites" on WKLF radio station in Clanton, Alabama. His first broadcast was on December 2, 1947 and it became the nation's longest continuously running daily Gospel radio program. In 1974 Easterling's composition "When I Wake Up To Sleep No More" as performed by The Inspirations was number one on the Singing News magazine's gospel charts for seven consecutive months. It held that position from April through October and then again for December. He was awarded the Broadcast Media Gospel Award in 1976. On April 17, 1986, Easterling was recognized on the U.S. Senate floor in a tribute by Alabama Senator Jeremiah Denton. Easterling died December 10, 1989, in a Birmingham, Alabama hospital and is buried in Martin Memorial Cemetery in Clanton, Alabama.
