= Vanish into You =

2025 song by Lady Gaga

Song by Lady Gaga

from the album Mayhem
- Released: March 7, 2025
- Studio: Shangri-La (Malibu, CA)
- Genre: Glam rock; disco; power pop
- Length: 4:04
- Label: Interscope
- Songwriters: Lady Gaga; Andrew Watt; Henry Walter; Michael Polansky
- Producers: Lady Gaga; Andrew Watt; Cirkut

Official audio
- "Vanish into You" on YouTube

"Vanish into You" is a song by American singer Lady Gaga from her studio album Mayhem (2025). It was released on March 7, 2025, through Interscope Records as the album's fifth track. Gaga began writing the song with Andrew Watt in 2023, making it the first track recorded for Mayhem. Cirkut and Michael Polansky also received songwriting credits, while Gaga, Watt and Cirkut produced it. Combining glam rock, disco and power pop, the song drew comparisons to the music of David Bowie and ABBA. Gaga described it as an "apocalyptic love song" about wanting to disappear into the person she loves most.

"Vanish into You" received generally positive reviews from music critics, several of whom considered it among the strongest songs on Mayhem and praised Gaga's vocals. Others were less enthusiastic about its production and lyrics. The song reached number 38 on the Billboard Global 200 and number 61 on the US Billboard Hot 100, while also charting in Brazil, Canada and several European countries. Gaga performed it during her 2025–2026 concert series in promotion of Mayhem, where she approached fans at the barricades during the song. She also performed piano-led versions on The Late Show with Stephen Colbert and KCRW, and included the song in her 2026 Mayhem Requiem concert.

== Background and release ==
Gaga began writing "Vanish into You" with producer Andrew Watt in 2023 at The Village recording studio in Los Angeles. According to Brian Hiatt of Rolling Stone, it was the first song recorded for Mayhem, and Watt later suggested involving Cirkut in its production. In December 2024, Gaga spoke about the then-unreleased track, describing its "hard-hitting beats", Queen-inspired vocals and guitars influenced by David Bowie.

The title was announced on February 18, 2025, when Gaga unveiled the track listing for Mayhem, with "Vanish into You" appearing as the fifth song. At a fan press conference hosted by Spotify in March, Gaga confirmed that it was the first song written for the album. She called it an "apocalyptic love song", explaining that she imagined wanting to "disappear into the person I love most". Elle suggested that she was referring to her fiancé, Michael Polansky.

== Recording and composition ==
"Vanish into You"
A 25-second sample of "Vanish into You" highlighting its glam rock– and disco-infused production, as well as the screeching vocals and "pining yelps" that prompted comparisons to Gaga's 2009 single "Bad Romance" and evoke ABBA-like melodies.

"Vanish into You" was written by Gaga, Andrew Watt, Cirkut and Michael Polansky, and produced by Gaga, Watt and Cirkut. The song was recorded at Shangri-La in Malibu and The Village Studios in Los Angeles, California. It is a glam rock, disco, and power pop song, featuring a four-on-the-floor beat that draws on funk influences. The Independent's Adam White and Pitchfork's Jaeden Pinder stated the track showcases screeching vocals and "pining yelps" from Gaga. "Vanish into You" slightly slows down the tempo of Mayhem, when compared to the preceding songs. Lyrically, Gaga reminisces about a past romance, expressing a longing to merge with the memory of that experience. Talia M. Wilson from Riff magazine said the track examines the merging of one's identity with a partner's as a way to shield from emotions. Paper Mag's Justin Moran called it "a discovery of love". Spencer Kornhaber from The Atlantic described the track as portraying innocent, lighthearted romance while also hinting at darker, more dependent emotional undertones.

Both Stephen Daw from Billboard and Jem Aswad from Variety identified influences from David Bowie. Variety's Steven J. Horowitz further observed that the song's ascent into its chorus exhibits a tension similar to that found in "Bad Romance" (2009). Likewise, India Block from The London Standard felt it "takes 'Bad Romance' into a major key". Robin Murray from Clash magazine highlighted the "disco-fringed synths recalling ABBA's imperial phase" and the "slight retro touch". Vulture's Kristen S. Hé called it "an ABBA song through and through" with "happy-sad Swedish chords and melodies". Neil Z. Yeung from AllMusic believed the track evokes the style of The Fame, Gaga's 2008 debut album. Some fans pointed out parallels with Gaga's late collaborator Tony Bennett, based on lyrics that evoked some of his best-known songs, including "Blue Moon" (1958) and "For Once in My Life" (1967). It is performed in the key of D major with a tempo of 112 beats per minute in common time. The chorus follows a chord progression of G–A–D–Bm, while the verses follow Bm–D–A–G–Em. Gaga's vocals span nearly two octaves in the song, from E_{3} to D_{5}.

== Reception ==
"Vanish into You" received generally positive reviews from music critics, particularly for Gaga's vocals and the song's production. Stephen Daw of Billboard considered it one of the most impressive vocal performances on Mayhem, praising the chorus harmonies and Gaga's use of her vocal range. Richard Burn of Rolling Stone UK regarded the song as a career highlight, praising its combination of dance, funk and experimental pop. Ben Beaumont-Thomas of The Guardian praised Gaga's "stentorian operatics" and included the track among several album cuts he considered strong enough to have been singles. Drew Gillis of The A.V. Club praised Gaga's melodramatic delivery, describing the song as one of the album's strongest ballads. In Pitchfork, Rich Juzwiak noted Gaga's "self-consciously corny swagger" during the verses and the unusually high backing vocals in the chorus. Coleman Spilde of Salon named "Vanish into You" among the album's strongest songs, describing it as a romantic track about longing to become inseparable from a loved one, even after their departure. Hazel Cills of NPR Music regarded the song as an example of Gaga's confidence in returning to the pop style that established her career.

Other reviewers were less impressed. Adam White of The Independent criticized the song's uneven production and Gaga's strained vocals, ranking it 86th in his retrospective of her discography. Ludovic Hunter-Tilney of the Financial Times was similarly critical, describing the lyrics as "rote expressions of passion" and unfavorably comparing Gaga's singing to a Coldplay anthem. Gary Grimes of Attitude compared the verses to the music of Pet Shop Boys and Bronski Beat, but called it the album's "first song that feels quite inessential".

The song later appeared on several year-end lists. Variety included it among the best songs of 2025, with Ethan Shanfeld praising the contrast between its ballad-like opening and dance-pop chorus. Paste ranked it at number 39 on its list of the year's best songs. Matt Mitchell praised its high-pitched chorus and polished production, describing it as one of Gaga's most joyful performances in over a decade. In a readers' poll conducted by Billboard, "Vanish into You" was voted the favorite track from Mayhem.

== Commercial performance ==
Following the release of Mayhem, "Vanish into You" debuted at number 38 on the Billboard Global 200. In the United States, it entered the Billboard Hot 100 at number 61 and the Hot Dance/Pop Songs chart at number four. Gaga had nine songs on the latter chart that week, with only "Abracadabra" and "Garden of Eden" placing higher than "Vanish into You". Elsewhere in the Americas, the song reached number 53 on the Canadian Hot 100 and number 28 on the Brasil Hot 100. It also received a diamond certification from Pro-Música Brasil.

In the United Kingdom, "Vanish into You" did not enter the UK Singles Chart, which limits artists to three entries at a time. During its release week, Gaga was represented by "Abracadabra" at number three, "Die with a Smile" at number 18 and "Garden of Eden" at number 23. "Vanish into You" nevertheless appeared on three other UK rankings, reaching number 46 on the Official Audio Streaming Chart, number 81 on the UK Singles Downloads Chart and number 86 on the UK Singles Sales Chart. The song also charted in Greece, France and Spain.

== Live performances ==
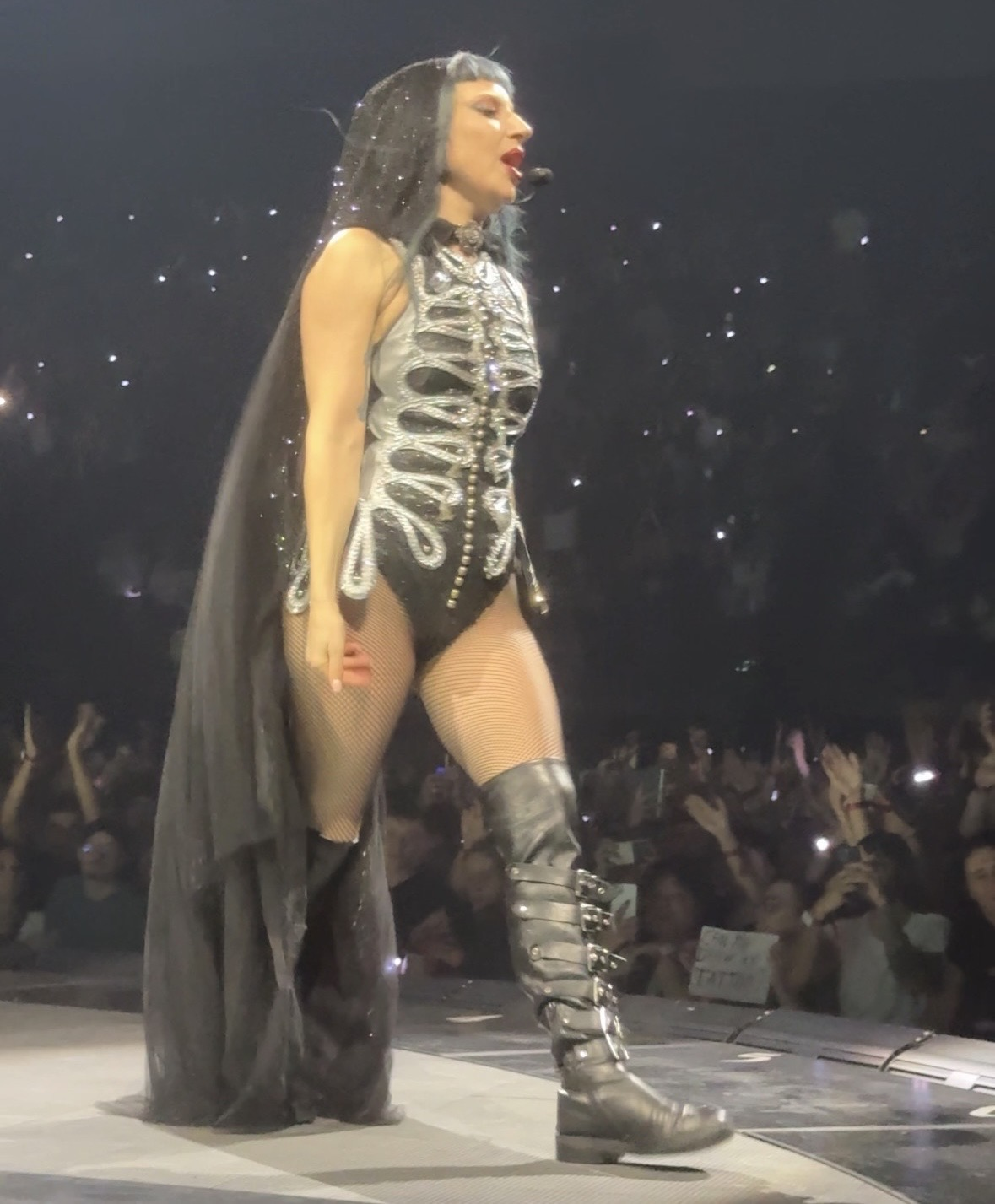
Gaga performing "Vanish into You" at The Mayhem Ball tour in 2025

Gaga performed "Vanish into You" at her 2025–2026 The Art of Personal Chaos shows, which included promotional concerts, such as her headlining set at Coachella, as well as her seventh solo headlining tour, the Mayhem Ball. During the song, she leapt down from the stage and moved toward the barricade, where she greeted fans, accepted bouquets, and signed autographs. For the early version of the show, Gaga wore a grey military-style jacket designed by Louis Verdad in collaboration with costume director Samuel Lewis, while on the Mayhem Ball, she wore a black hooded cloak inspired by The Phantom of the Opera, according to Deadline Hollywood.

On May 13, 2025, Gaga performed "Vanish into You" during a five-song set at the YouTube Brandcast event, held at the David Geffen Hall in New York City. On September 8, 2025, she sang it on The Late Show with Stephen Colbert, delivering a stripped-down rendition. She was accompanied by two guitarists — one electric and one acoustic — while sitting in a black dress behind the piano, which she started playing with the second verse. The projections behind Gaga alternated between black-and-white close-ups of her performing and dramatic images of stormy, cloud-filled skies. Paolo Ragusa of Consequence praised Gaga's "mesmerizing and heartfelt" vocals, while Billboard's Gil Kaufman described her rendition as a "spare, chilling" ballad.

On October 3, 2025, Gaga performed "Vanish into You" on piano at Santa Monica, California's radio station KCRW. The song also appeared in Gaga's live album and concert film Apple Music Live: Mayhem Requiem, which was released on May 14, 2026, and recorded during an invite-only performance at the Wiltern Theatre in Los Angeles in January 2026.

== Credits and personnel ==
Credits are adapted from the liner notes of Mayhem.

Recording

- Recorded at Shangri-La, and The Village.
- Mixed at MixStar Studios (Virginia Beach, Virginia)
- Mastered at Sterling Sound (New York City)

Personnel

- Lady Gaga – vocals, keyboards, producer
- Andrew Watt – keyboards, bass, drums, electric guitar, percussion, acoustic guitar, composer, producer
- Henry Walter – keyboards, synthesizer, drum programming, composer, producer
- Michael Polansky – composer
- Paul Lamalfa – engineer
- Marco Sonzini – additional engineer
- Tyler Harris – additional engineer
- Serban Ghenea – mixing engineer
- Bryce Bordone – assistant mixing engineer
- Randy Merrill – mastering engineer

== Charts ==
Chart (2025)	Peak position
Brazil Hot 100 (Billboard)	28
Bolivia Anglo Airplay (Monitor Latino)	12
Canada Hot 100 (Billboard)	53
France (SNEP)	91
Global 200 (Billboard)	38
Greece International (IFPI)	32
New Zealand Hot Singles (RMNZ)	5
Panama Anglo Airplay (Monitor Latino)	13
Portugal (AFP)	67
Singapore (RIAS)	14
South Korea Download (Circle)	198
Spain (PROMUSICAE)	96
Sweden Heatseeker (Sverigetopplistan)	3
UK Singles Downloads (Official Charts)	81
UK Singles Sales (OCC)	86
UK Streaming (OCC)	46
US Billboard Hot 100	61
US Hot Dance/Pop Songs (Billboard)	4

== Certifications ==
Certifications
Region	Certification	Certified units/sales
Brazil (Pro-Música Brasil)	Diamond	160,000^{‡}
^{‡} Sales+streaming figures based on certification alone.
