= When the Saints Go Marching In =

African-American gospel hymn

"When the Saints Go Marching In"
Performed by the Scallywags of the United States Air Force Band of the West

"When the Saints Go Marching In", often referred to as simply "The Saints", is a traditional African-American spiritual. It originated as a Christian hymn and became a jazz standard associated with New Orleans, Louisiana, where it is traditionally performed at jazz funerals. One of the most famous jazz recordings of "The Saints" was made on 13 May 1938, by Louis Armstrong and his orchestra.

The song is sometimes confused with a similarly titled 1896 composition: "When the Saints Are Marching In" by Katharine Purvis (lyrics) and James Milton Black (music). In June 2026, CBS News included the hymn in its list of the 250 essential American songs of the past 250 years.

== Origins and usage ==
The origins of this song are unclear. It apparently evolved in the early 1900s from a number of similarly titled gospel songs, including "When the Saints Are Marching In" (1896) and "When the Saints March In for Crowning" (1908). The first known recorded version was in 1923 by the Paramount Jubilee Singers on Paramount 12073. Although the title given on the label is "When All the Saints Come Marching In", the group sings the modern lyrics beginning with "When the saints go marching in". No author is shown on the label. Several other gospel versions were recorded in the 1920s, with slightly varying titles but using the same lyrics, including versions by The Four Harmony Kings (1924), Elkins-Payne Jubilee Singers (1924), Wheat Street Female Quartet (1925), Bo Weavil Jackson (1926), Deaconess Alexander (1926), Rev. E. D. Campbell (1927), Robert Hicks (AKA Barbecue Bob, 1927), Blind Willie Davis (1928), and the Pace Jubilee Singers (1928).

The earliest versions were slow and stately, but as time passed, the recordings became more rhythmic, including a distinctly up-tempo version by the Sanctified Singers on British Parlophone in 1931.

Even though the song had folk roots, a number of composers claimed copyright in it in later years, including Luther G. Presley and Virgil Oliver Stamps, R. E. Winsett. The tune is particularly associated with the city of New Orleans. A jazz standard, it has been recorded by many jazz and pop artists.

== Lyrics ==
As with many numbers with long traditional folk use, there is no one "official" version of the song or its lyrics. This extends so far as confusion as to its name, with it often being mistakenly called "When the Saints Come Marching In". As for the lyrics themselves, their very simplicity makes it easy to generate new verses. Since the first and second lines of a verse are exactly the same, and the third and four are standard throughout, the creation of one suitable line in iambic tetrameter generates an entire verse.

It is extremely difficult to list every version of the song, but a common standard version runs:

Oh, when the saints go marching in
Oh, when the saints go marching in
Oh Lord I want to be in that number
When the saints go marching in.

Oh, when the drums begin to bang
Oh, when the drums begin to bang
Oh Lord I want to be in that number
When the saints go marching in.

Oh, when the stars fall from the sky
Oh, when the stars fall from the sky
Oh Lord I want to be in that number
When the saints go marching in.

Oh, when the sun refuse to shine
Oh, when the sun refuse to shine
Oh Lord I want to be in that number
When the saints go marching in.

Oh, when the moon turns red with blood
Oh, when the moon turns red with blood
Oh Lord I want to be in that number
When the saints go marching in.

Oh, when the trumpet sounds its call
Oh, when the trumpet sounds its call
Oh Lord I want to be in that number
When the saints go marching in.

Oh, when the horsemen begin to ride
Oh, when the horsemen begin to ride
Oh Lord I want to be in that number
When the saints go marching in.

Oh, brother Charles you are my friend
Oh, brother Charles you are my friend
Yea, you gonna be in that number
When the saints go marching in.

Oh, when the saints go marching in
Oh, when the saints go marching in
Oh Lord I want to be in that number
When the saints go marching in.

Often the first two words of the common third verse line ("Lord, how I want...") are sung as either "Oh how", "Oh, Lord" or even "Lord, Lord" as cue notes to the simple melody at each third line.

Arrangements vary considerably. The simplest is just an endless repetition of the chorus. Verses may be alternated with choruses, or put in the third of four repetitions to create an AABA form with the verse as the bridge.

Some traditional arrangements often have ensemble rather than individual vocals. It is also common as an audience sing-along number. Versions using call and response are often heard, e.g.:

- Call: Oh when the Saints
- Response: Oh when the Saints!

The response verses can echo the same melody or form a counterpoint melody, often syncopated opposite the rhythm of the main verses, and a solo singer might sing another counterpoint melody (solo soprano or tenor) as a 3rd part in more complex arrangements.

== Analysis of the traditional lyrics ==
The song takes much of its imagery from the Book of Revelation, but excluding its more alarming depictions of the Last Judgment. The verses about the sun and moon (often interpreted as solar and lunar eclipses) correlate to prophecy in the Book of Joel, which is also referenced by the Apostle Peter in Acts of the Apostles: ("The sun will be turned to darkness and the moon to blood before the coming of the great and glorious day of the Lord"). The trumpet is the way in which the Last Judgment is announced. As the hymn expresses the wish to go to Heaven, picturing the saints going in (through the pearly gates), it is sometimes played at funerals.

== Bill Haley and His Comets version ==
"The Saints Rock 'N' Roll"

Single by Bill Haley & His Comets
- B-side: "R-O-C-K"
- Released: March 1956
- Recorded: 23 September 1955
- Genre: Rock and roll, gospel
- Length: 3:28
- Label: Decca Records

Bill Haley & His Comets recorded a rock and roll version of the song titled "The Saints Rock 'N' Roll". Bill Haley started the song, which he learned through his mother, with the line "Rocking and rolling all the way". The song was recorded on 23 September 1955, and released in March 1956 backed with "R-O-C-K" on Decca Records. It reached No. 18 on Billboard's Best Sellers chart, and No. 5 in the UK chart. A version of the song was included in the soundtrack of the 1956 film Rock, Pretty Baby.

=== Charts ===
Chart (1956)	Peak position
UK Singles (Official Charts)	5
US Best Sellers in Stores (Billboard)	18
US Cash Box Top 100	23

== Other versions ==
=== As gospel hymn ===
- First recorded by the Paramount Jubilee Singers on Paramount 12073, mid-November 1923. This group may be related to the Elkins-Payne Jubilee Singers.
- Four Harmony Kings, Vocalion 14941, mid-November 1924.
- Elkins-Payne Jubilee Singers, Okeh 8170. c. 24 November 1924.
- Bo Weavil Jackson, c. August 1926 in Chicago, IL, under the title "When the Saints Come Marching Home", Paramount 12390.
- Recorded by bluesman Sleepy John Estes accompanied by second guitar and kazoo for Bluebird Records in Chicago, 1941.
- This song is available in the Elvis Presley compilation Peace in the Valley: The Complete Gospel Recordings. Sony BMG/Elvis Music

=== With traditional lyrics ===
- Louis Armstrong helped make The Saints into a jazz standard with his 1938 Decca recording, which was added to the National Recording Registry by the Library of Congress in 2021.
- The tune was brought into the early rock and roll repertory by Fats Domino as one of the traditional New Orleans numbers he often played to rock audiences. Domino would usually use "The Saints" as his grand finale number, sometimes with his horn players leaving the stage to parade through the theater aisles or around the dance floor. Domino's version is also played by the New Orleans Saints at home games after scoring a touchdown.
- Judy Garland sang it in her own pop style.
- Connee Boswell recorded the number with the Original Memphis Five in 1957.
- Elvis Presley performed the song during the Million Dollar Quartet jam session and also recorded a version for his film, Frankie and Johnny.
- Bing Crosby included the song in a medley on his album 101 Gang Songs (1961)
- Other early rock artists to follow Domino's lead included Jerry Lee Lewis.
- Donna Hightower recorded the song in 1962 for Barclay Records as a swinging Twist number, complete with a scat vocal and imitation of Louis Armstrong.
- Larry Groce sang the song on Disney Children's Favorite Songs 2 in 1979.
- The Kidsongs Kids sang this song at the end of their "Day At Camp" video.
- In 1990, John Rutter arranged a lively version of the song for the Cambridge Singers, piano or organ accompaniment, and a Dixieland jazz-style clarinet obbligato.
- Etta James performed the song during the 1984 Summer Olympics opening ceremony.
- Briefly featured in the intro of Church Heathen music video of Jamaican reggae musician Shaggy.
- Lady Gaga recorded a soul-funk version of the song for Harlequin (2024), her companion album to the American musical thriller film Joker: Folie à Deux (2024). The song was also sung by different characters throughout the film.

=== With non-traditional lyrics ===
- Louis Armstrong and Danny Kaye performed a comedy duet version in the 1959 film The Five Pennies, naming composers and musicians who would play "on the day that the saints go marching in".
- Woody Guthrie sang a song called "When The Yanks Go Marching In" in 1943.*(The Weaver's) at Carnegie Hall track 16.1955 VMD-73101.
- Tony Sheridan made a successful rock and roll arrangement of the song which he recorded in 1961 with the then-unknown band The Beatles as a backing group, significantly deviating some verses from the original lyrics. It was originally released as the B-side of a single coupled with "My Bonnie".
- In 1983, Aaron Neville, along with New Orleans musicians Sal and Steve Monistere and Carlo Nuccio and a group of players for the New Orleans Saints American football team, recorded a popular version of the song incorporating the team's "Who Dat?" chant.
- A version was released by John Edmond on his album "All Time Rhodesian Evergreens" entitled "The Saints" with additional verses about soldiers going on parade, doing fireforce, among other things.

=== As sports chants ===
"When the Saints Go Marching In" is frequently sung as football chants by fans during association football matches, as well as by Rugby Union (particularly fans of Northampton Saints) and Rugby League most notably by the NRL team, St George Illawarra Dragons as well as fans in the English equivalent, the Super League, by St Helens RLFC and Oldham RLFC with saints replaced by "yeds".

Examples include "When the Saints Go Marching In" (St Johnstone F.C., Southampton F.C., St Albans City F.C., and St Patrick's Athletic F.C.), "When the Reds Go Marching In (Liverpool FC)", "When the Posh Go Steaming In" (Peterborough United F.C.), "When the Greens Go Marching In" (Plymouth Argyle F.C.), "When the Spurs Go Marching In" or "When the Stripes Go Marching In" (Tottenham Hotspur), and "When the Blues Go Steaming In" (Chelsea FC and Bengaluru FC), "Oh when the beans come oot the tin". Liverpool fans may have been introduced the chant when they used it for their star player Ian St John in the 1960s. However, Southampton fans claimed to have used it in the 1950s.

A less traditional version with edited lyrics is used as the club song for the St Kilda Football Club that compete in the Australian Football League.

=== Instrumental ===
- Bunk Johnson's Band recorded an instrumental version on 2 August 1944.
- Big Chief Jazzband recorded the tune in Oslo on 10 May 1953. It was released on the 78 rpm record by the His Master's Voice.
- Al Hirt released a version on his 1963 album, Our Man in New Orleans and was on The Best of Al Hirt.
- Bo Diddley and Chuck Berry released a version on the 1964 album, Two Great Guitars.
- Harry James released a version on his 1972 album Mr. Trumpet. (Longines Symphonette Society)
- It was recorded under the title "Revival" by Johnny and the Hurricanes. The band's management claimed authorship.
- The rhythm of "When the Saints Go Marching In" was adapted by Dick Powell's Four Star Television for its legal drama The Law and Mr. Jones starring James Whitmore, which ran on ABC from 1960 to 1962.
- "When The Saints Go Marching In" was the regimental quick march for the Rhodesian Light Infantry until its disbanding in 1980.
- Dominique, the battalion quick march of the 5th Battalion of the Royal Australian Regiment, has the melody of "When the Saints Go Marching In" adapted in its tune, along with the eponymous 1960s hit, sung by Jeanine Deckers (1933–1985).
- An arrangement of "When the Saints Go Marching In" is the official march of the Hälsinge Wing (F 15) in Sweden.
- Tuts Washington released a version on his 1983 album New Orleans Piano Professor.
- "The Saints Will Never Come" is an instrumental, sped-up and distorted version played in "The Parish", a campaign set in New Orleans of the 2009 video game Left 4 Dead 2.

== See also ==
- Communion of saints
- List of pre-1920 jazz standards
- "When the Saints Go Marching In" in sports
- Christian child's prayer § Spirituals
