= The Beast (Lady Gaga song) =

Song by Lady Gaga

from the album Mayhem
- Released: March 7, 2025
- Length: 3:54
- Label: Streamline; Interscope
- Songwriters: Lady Gaga; Andrew Watt; Henry Walter; Michael Polansky
- Producers: Lady Gaga; Andrew Watt; Cirkut

"The Beast" is a 2025 song by Lady Gaga, originally released on her studio album Mayhem. The song was written by Lady Gaga, Andrew Watt, Henry Walter (also known as Cirkut), and Michael Polansky.

== Composition ==
Billboard described the song as a "B-movie-esque pseudo-ballad" and said, " Singing to her lover — who also is a werewolf in this particular scenario — the pop star’s voice growls with anticipation, making you wonder which person is really the beast in this scenario. The strait-laced, dramatic production ends up giving way to a gratuitous guitar solo that adds a little edge to this otherwise fine track." Stereogum called the song "rapturous". Slant Magazine said the song "finds Gaga channeling Taylor Dayne via a Michael Jackson-style pop-rock hybrid, yet it doesn’t feel very dangerous at all". NME compared the song to the "melodrama" of Jackson's Bad (1987) era.

== Live performances ==
Gaga's debut live performance of the song was at Coachella 2025. She performs the song on Apple Music Live: Mayhem Requiem.

== Charts ==
Chart performance for "The Beast"
Chart (2025)	Peak position
US Bubbling Under Hot 100 (Billboard)	22
