= Stamps-Baxter Music Company =

Former Southern Gospel Music Publishing Company

- Status: Defunct
- Founded: 1924; 102 years ago
- Founder: Virgil Oliver Stamps; J.R. Baxter
- Defunct: 1986; 40 years ago
- Successor: Universal Music Group
- Country of origin: United States
- Headquarters location: Dallas, Texas, U.S. Chattanooga, Tennessee, U.S. Pangburn, Arkansas, U.S.
- Publication types: Music, magazines
- Fiction genres: Southern music

The Stamps-Baxter Music Company was an influential publishing company in the shape note Southern gospel music field. The company issued several paperback publications each year with cheap binding and printed on cheap paper. Thus, the older books are now in delicate condition. These songbooks were used in church singing events, called "conventions," as well as at other church events, although they did not take the place of regular hymnals. Among the country music and bluegrass "standards" that were first published by Stamps-Baxter are "Rank Strangers to Me", "Just a Little Talk with Jesus", "Precious Memories", "Farther Along", "If We Never Meet Again", "Victory in Jesus", and "I Won't Have to Cross Jordan Alone".

Stamps and Baxter operated a music school which was the primary source of the thousands of gospel songs they published. Another major part of the corporation was its sponsorship of gospel quartets who sang the company's music in churches throughout the southern United States. At the end of World War II they were sponsoring 35 such quartets. The company also had a quartet who sang on radio station KRLD in Dallas, beginning in 1936. This station would boost its transmitting power at midnight, so that it could be heard across the nation. An additional part of the Stamps-Baxter music empire was a magazine, Gospel Music News. Each part of the corporation supported every other part, giving strength to the entire organization.

== History ==
Virgil Oliver Stamps founded the company in 1924 and J. R. Baxter Jr. joined him to form the Stamps-Baxter Music Company, which was based in Dallas, Texas, with offices in Chattanooga, Tennessee and Pangburn, Arkansas. Stamps got his start working for the James D. Vaughan Publishing Company from which he got many of his business ideas.

In 1945, Frank Stamps, younger brother of V. O. Stamps, left the organization to form the rival Stamps Quartet Music Company. At the same time a number of quartets left Stamps-Baxter resulting in the end of the company's quartet sponsorship coinciding with the end of the war. Frank's defection did not hurt the Stamps-Baxter company in the long run, although it did lead to some confusion among the public. The Stamps-Baxter School of Music declined after World War II, but its successor continues to this day as an annual two-week singing school under the leadership of Ben Speer.

Stamps died in 1940, leaving the company to J. R. Baxter. After Baxter died in 1960, his widow, Clarice Howard "Ma" Baxter, ran the company until her death in 1972. In 1974, the company was sold to Zondervan, which became part of the Benson Company in 1986, and is now part of Universal Music Group. The choral publishing arm was subsequently sold to the Cooperative Baptist Fellowship-associated Celebrating Grace, Inc. in 2023.

== Songbooks ==
The "convention" song books typically included 140 songs. The first song would be on the inside front cover, numbered 00 with the first song inside the book being numbered 1-A, and the rest of the songs were numbered 1 through 138. Each book included four or five older public domain songs such as John Newton's "Amazing Grace", Mackay's "Revive Us Again", Stennett's "I Am Bound for the Promised Land", and Smith's "America". In addition, one or two songs from earlier Stamps-Baxter publications might be included. The other 134 songs would consist of new material that had never been published before. The authors and composers of these songs were paid as much as $7.00 for each song, which would be the only monetary compensation that they would get.

=== Copyrights ===
The Stamps-Baxter company was careful to renew its copyrights under United States copyright law. The collections, not the individual songs, were copyrighted, so that anyone looking up records for the songs must know in which collection it was first published. Under current U. S. copyright law, works published between 1922 and 1963 will not enter public domain until 95 years after their initial year of copyright if the copyright was renewed. Thus, a Stamps-Baxter song last copyrighted in 1929 will enter public domain in 2024.

There is also a claim to copyright on these songs. On October 16, 1998, three corporations, Brentwood-Benson Music Publishing, Inc., Stamps-Baxter Music, and Bridge Building Music, Inc., filed for copyright on "Glory Special" & 19,618 other titles. This large collection includes all of the Stamps-Baxter convention songs. Universal Music Publishing International MGB Limited now owns Stamps-Baxter Music and Bridge Building Music. Therefore, the copyright is maintained by Universal Music Publishing International MGB Limited.

=== Titles ===
Stamps-Baxter titles and copyright dates
- Crystal Rays (1929)
- Priceless Pearls (1929)
- Glory Gleaner (1930)
- Cheerful Chimes (1931)
- Tuneful Praise (1931)
- Singers Choice (1932)
- Harbor Bells Number Two (1933)
- Boundless Joy (1933?)
- Harbor Bells Number Three (1934)
- Leading Light (1934)
- New Day Spirituals (1934)
- Harbor Bells Number Four (1935)
- Thankful Hearts (1935)
- Glory Dawn (1936)
- Harbor Bells Number Five (1936)
- Harbor Bells Number Six (1937)
- Starlit Crown (1937)
- Brightest Beams (1938)
- Guiding Star (1938)
- Gospel Tide (1939)
- Joyful Songs (1939)
- Comfort and Consolation (1940)
- Golden Key (1940?)
- Pearly Gates (1940)
- Faithful Guide (1941)
- Golden Key (1941?)
- Pilgrim Songs (1941)
- Lasting Peace (1942)
- Blessed Hope (1942)
- Heaven's Lamp (1943)
- Anchored Faith (1943)
- Songs Supreme (1943)
- Grateful Praise (1944)
- Calvary Sings (1944)
- Zion's Call (1944)
- Living Grace (1945)
- Humble Hearts (1945)
- Jubilee Spirituals (1945)
- Rainbow Rays (1946)
- Shining Path (1946)
- Sentimental Songs (1946)
- Sunlit Way (1947)
- Highest Praise (1947)
- Garden of Melody (1947)
- Harmony Gems (1947)
- Glory Waves (1948)
- Silver Tones (1948)
- Peaceful Echoes (1948)
- Morning Light (1949)
- Boundless Love (1949)
- Chords of Love (1949)
- Star of Hope (1949)
- Better Songs (1950)
- Sharon's Rose (1950)
- Crimson Glow (1951)
- Precious Name (1951)
- Melodies of Joy (1951)
- Inspirational Melodies (1952)
- Singers Pride (1952)
- Solid Rock (1952)
- Songs of Cheer (1952)
- Harvest Songs (1953)
- Celestial Songs (1953)
- Gospel Ship (1953)
- Songs of Joy (1953)
- Chiming Bells (1954)
- Carols of Love (1954)
- Higher Ground (1954)
- Joyful Melodies (1954)
- Gospel Light (1955)
- Shepherd's Love (1955)
- Heaven's Banner (1955)
- Happy Praise (1956)
- Matchless Gift (1956)
- Sacred Tones (1956)
- Crowning Joy (1957)
- Master's Call (1957)
- Melodies of Love (1957)
- Living Gems (1958)
- Silver Gleams (1958)
- Perfect Joy (1959)
- Golden Chimes (1959)
- Dawning Light (1960)
- Vict'ry Songs (1960)
- Good Songs (1960)
- Precious Abiding Peace (1960)
- Holy Light (1961)
- Saving Grace (1961)
- Glory Bells (1962)
- Endless Joy (1962?)
- Gospel Way (1962)
- Herald of Good Tidings (1962)
- Endless Joy (1963?)
- Temple Gates (1963)
- Upward Way (1963?)
- Upward Way (1964?)
- Winning Songs (1964)
- Chapel Chords (1964?)
- Chapel Chords (1965?)
- Morning Sunbeams (1965)
- Redeeming Love (1965)
- Harbor Lights (1966)
- Wondrous Love (1966?)
- Wondrous Love (1967?)
- Redemption Songs (1967)
- Radiant Gems (1967?)
- Radiant Gems (1968?)
- Chapel Bells (1968)
- Glory Beams (1968)
- Glory Beams (1969)
- Harps of Gold (1969)
- Eternal Praise (1969)
- Eternal Praise (1970)
- Supernal Joy (1970)
- Gospel Songs (1970?)
- Gospel Songs (1971?)
- Glad Tidings (1971?)
- Joyful Praise (1971)
- Glad Tidings (1972?)
- Gospel Praise (1972?)
- Love Divine (1972)
- Gospel Praise (1973?)
- Songs of Zion (1973)
- Sacred Gems (1973?)
- Sacred Gems (1973?)
- Saving Power (1973)
Stamps-Baxter of Zondervan titles and copyright dates
- New Gospel Songs (1975)
- Golden Songs of Glory (1976)
- Gospel Songs of Cheer (1976)
- Gospel Songs of Cheer (1977)
- Songs of Rejoicing (1977)
- New Songs of Praise (1977)
- Songs of Victory (1978)
- Songs of Jubilation (1978)
- Praising Him (1979)
- Joy in Singing (1979)
- Sing a New Song (1980)
- Voices in Song (1980)
- Music is Ringing (1981)
- Notes of Praise (1981)
- Heaven's Harmony (1982)
- Sing for Joy (1982)
- Songs of the Kingdom (1983)
- Christian Praise (1984)
- Gospel Hymnal Volume III (1985)
- Great Gospel (1985)
- Praising His Name (1985)
- Singing Together (1986)
- Let All Rejoice (1986)
Stamps-Baxter of Universal Music (fka Zondervan/Benson Company) titles and copyright dates
- A Time to Sing (1987)
- Divine Joy (1988)
- Master's Voice (1988)
- Calvary’s Song (1989)
- Joyous Praise (1989)
- Matchless Love (1990)

== See also ==
- Marion W. Easterling
