= The Art of Personal Chaos =

2025–2026 concert tour by Lady Gaga

- Tour by Lady Gaga
- Promotional poster for the Mayhem Ball iteration of the concert series
- Location: Asia; Europe; North America; Oceania; South America
- Associated album: Mayhem
- Start date: April 11, 2025
- End date: April 13, 2026
- No. of shows: 95 (Note: Nine promotional concerts were followed by 86 shows of the Mayhem Ball.)
- Producer: Live Nation
- Attendance: 4.4 million (Note: Combined reported attendance for the Mayhem Ball and the promotional concerts in Brazil, Mexico, and Singapore. Gaga's two Coachella performances are excluded because no official attendance figures specific to her sets were reported.)
- Box office: $419.5 million (Note: The reported gross covers 92 shows, including the Mayhem Ball and the ticketed promotional concerts.)
- Website: ladygaga.com/live

Lady Gaga concert chronology
- The Chromatica Ball (2022); The Art of Personal Chaos (2025–2026)

The Art of Personal Chaos was a concert series by American singer Lady Gaga in support of her eighth studio album, Mayhem (2025), beginning with promotional performances and continuing with her eighth concert tour, the Mayhem Ball. Gaga first presented the show with headlining performances at the Coachella festival on April 11 and 18, followed by concerts in Mexico, Brazil, and Singapore, marking her first appearances in those countries since the Born This Way Ball in 2012. The Mayhem Ball began on July 16, 2025, at T-Mobile Arena in Paradise, Nevada, and concluded on April 13, 2026, at Madison Square Garden in New York City, spanning 86 shows across Asia, Europe, North America, and Oceania. In Australia, these were her first shows since 2014's ArtRave: The Artpop Ball.

The Art of Personal Chaos presented a five-act theatrical show built around themes of duality and inner chaos, with large-scale staging, a Colosseum-like opera house set, couture-inspired fashion, and a narrative exploring duality, death, and rebirth. The production was revised for the arena-based Mayhem Ball, with changes to the setlist and several new outfits. Gaga developed the show with Parris Goebel, who also served as choreographer, and her fiancé, Michael Polansky. Both the initial incarnation of the show (Note: Attributed to multiple sources:) and the tour version (Note: Attributed to multiple sources:) received widespread critical acclaim, particularly for their theatricality, Gaga's vocal performance, production design, costumes, and choreography. Critics also regarded the Mayhem Ball as a celebration of Gaga's career, and the tour received several industry award nominations, including from the American Music Awards, Pollstar Awards, and iHeartRadio Music Awards.

Following the final concert of the series on April 13, 2026, Billboard reported that it had grossed $419.5 million and sold nearly two million tickets across 93 shows, including the Mayhem Ball and the ticketed promotional concerts in Mexico City and Singapore. The free concert at Copacabana Beach in Rio de Janeiro attracted an estimated 2.5 million people, becoming the largest performance of Gaga's career and the most-attended concert by a female artist. (Note: Promoter Live Nation and Gaga's representatives estimated the audience at 2.5 million, while local authorities reported 2.1 million.)

== Background ==
Lady Gaga's last headlining concert tour, the Chromatica Ball (2022), consisted of a brief itinerary of 20 shows at outdoor stadiums throughout North America, Europe, and Japan. As the tour began, Gaga revealed that she was able to perform without much of the chronic pain caused by her long-term fibromyalgia for the first time "in ages". Health improvements and the tour's commercial success and positive critical reception reignited her confidence in her performance and her ability to tour. The tour was chronicled via Gaga Chromatica Ball, a critically acclaimed concert film released on May 25, 2024, in collaboration with HBO and its streaming service, HBO Max.

Alongside editing Gaga Chromatica Ball and completing her duties associated with her role in Joker: Folie à Deux (2024) and its accompanying soundtrack, Gaga spent most of 2023 and 2024 recording what she referred to as "some of the best songs [she] can remember". These sessions culminated in two studio albums, 2024's Harlequin and 2025's Mayhem, the latter of which reached the top of music charts in over 20 countries around the world and was described as a "chaotic blur of genres" focused in Gaga's pop roots. Before the concert series, the album was supported by the release of the singles, "Disease" and "Abracadabra".

== Announcements ==
=== Original shows ===
The Coachella performances and concerts in Mexico City, Rio de Janeiro, and Singapore were each marketed under distinctive titles; the latter three also received individual promotional posters (pictured).

Gaga first headlined Coachella in 2017 as a last-minute replacement for Beyoncé, who stepped down due to her pregnancy. In November 2024, Gaga announced her return to the festival in 2025 on social media. Describing it as "a massive night of chaos in the desert", she explained that she had a vision for Coachella that she could not fully realize earlier because of timing constraints, but was ready to present it to fans. In the days leading up to the event, Gaga told Rolling Stone that she had worked with choreographer Parris Goebel on a "very special" performance, crafted "moment by moment," while choosing not to reveal further details. Prior to the festival, her performance had been teased as "Mayhem in the Desert".

The concerts held in Mexico City were hinted during the Brazilian press conference on February 21, 2025, indicating that Gaga would be offering "a couple of stadium shows between her appearances at Coachella and Copacabana". The official announcement was released on March 3, with the event dubbed "Long Live Mayhem" (Spanish: Viva la Mayhem), and scheduled for April 26 and 27 at Estadio GNP Seguros.

Gaga performed a free concert on May 3, 2025, at Copacabana Beach in Rio de Janeiro, Brazil. She announced the event with the moniker "Mayhem on the Beach" (Portuguese: Mayhem na Praia) on February 21, 2025, through her social media. Her statement coincided with a press conference at the Prio Theater in Rio de Janeiro, where the event's production company, Bonus Track, confirmed that it was organized as part of the Todo Mundo no Rio initiative, in collaboration with the city government and the state administration. A public rehearsal with an incomplete, out-of-order set list was held the day before the show. She last visited the country as part of the Born This Way Ball tour in 2012, which included shows in Rio de Janeiro, São Paulo, and Porto Alegre. She was scheduled to headline the Rock in Rio festival in September 2017, but had to cancel due to severe pain caused by fibromyalgia, the same condition that ultimately forced her to end the Joanne World Tour later that year.

On March 10, Gaga announced on Instagram that she would perform four shows at Singapore National Stadium. This followed media speculation that Singapore would be the exclusive Southeast Asian host for Gaga's "largest world tour in her career". The concerts, billed as "Lion City Mayhem" (Malay: Mayhem Singapura), were promoted as Gaga's only shows in Asia in 2025.

=== The Mayhem Ball ===
On March 26, 2025, Gaga announced the Mayhem Ball concert tour through her social media accounts, unveiling an initial run of thirty-two dates in North American and European cities. Due to an overwhelming commercial response, additional concerts in both continents were announced throughout the next week, which included extra dates in New York City, Paradise, London and Paris, among others. Following these announcements, Hits and Rolling Stone identified the previously revealed outdoor promotional concerts as part of the tour, though Live Nation, the official promoter, and Billboard listed them separately under distinct titles, indicating they were not part of the Mayhem Ball.

To promote the tour, Gaga launched a tarot-themed minigame that invited fans to discover their "lyrical prophecy" through cards inspired by the show's narrative themes and connected to the tour's imagery and merchandise. On April 8, 2025, Gaga announced three dates scheduled for December at outdoor stadiums in Australia, marking her first shows in the country since ArtRave: The Artpop Ball tour in 2014. Due to initial demand, second shows in both Melbourne and Sydney, respectively, were added to the tour's itinerary. On April 22, 2025, succeeding Gaga's performances at Coachella, three shows in San Francisco and four shows in Inglewood were announced.

On June 9, 2025, Gaga announced five shows in Japan, scheduled at the Tokyo Dome and Osaka Dome for the following January. This announcement officially extended the tour to 2026. One month later, an additional show in Tokyo was announced due to overwhelming demand. In September 2025, Gaga announced additional dates throughout North America scheduled for 2026, including stops in new cities such as Washington, D.C., Montréal, Boston, and Saint Paul.

== Production ==
=== Production of the original shows ===
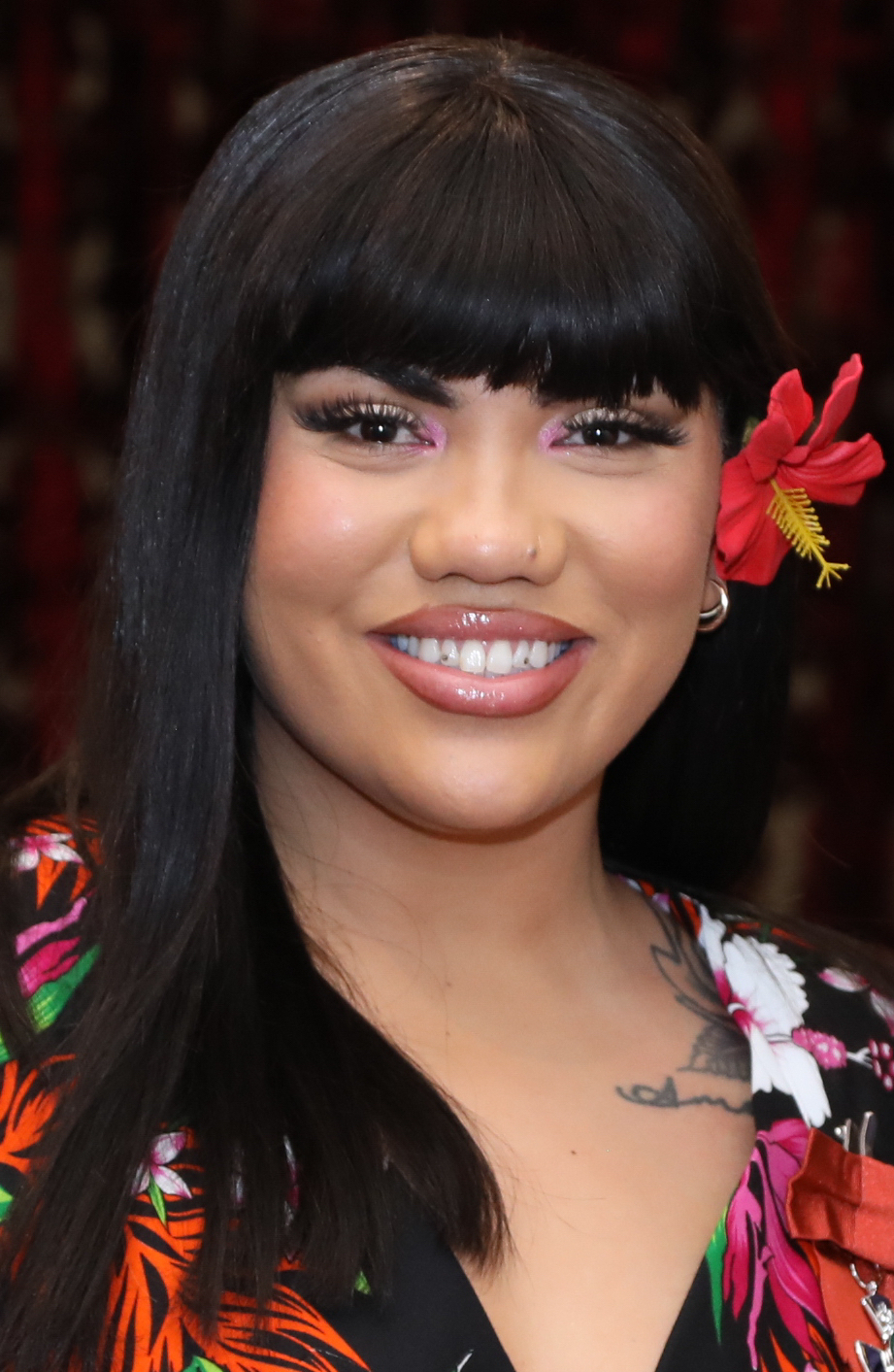
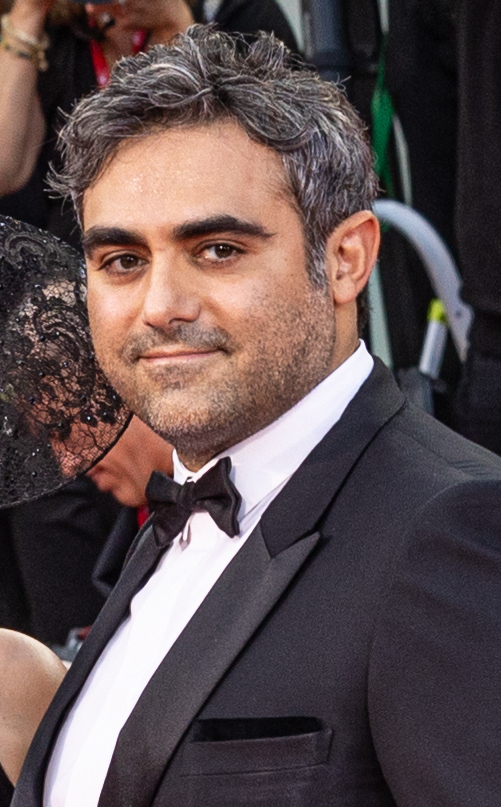
Parris Goebel (left) and Michael Polansky (right) developed the show together with Lady Gaga.

The first performance, held at the Coachella festival, marked the beginning of the stage proposal, with production directed by Gaga alongside Goebel, who also handled choreography. The two worked collaboratively from the overall concept to the staging, sharing visual references and designing each segment as a vignette with its own aesthetic and choreography. According to Goebel, the team began rehearsals on a short timeline and only managed one full run-through before the debut, due to the show's technical complexity. The set design, custom-made costumes, and lighting were crafted to reflect different facets of the Mayhem universe, drawing influence from experimental theater and designers such as Alexander McQueen, whose aesthetic inspired moments like the "Poker Face" performance. Several dance routines blended elements from Gaga's past choreography with new concepts, which Goebel described as balancing her legacy with a "fresh twist". Goebel emphasized the importance of the show's on-screen presentation, noting that much of the festival audience watched through large screens and that she worked closely with the director of photography to ensure the performance translated effectively to both the venue screens and the livestream.

For the Copacabana Beach concert in Rio de Janeiro, the production involved a large-scale technical deployment. The main stage covered 1,260 square meters and was elevated 2.2 meters above the sand to improve visibility. Behind it, a continuous LED screen measuring 60 meters wide and 806.25 square meters in surface area was installed, accompanied by 16 delay towers equipped with 9-meter-high screens distributed along the beach, providing consistent visuals across the venue.

=== Conception and stage setup ===
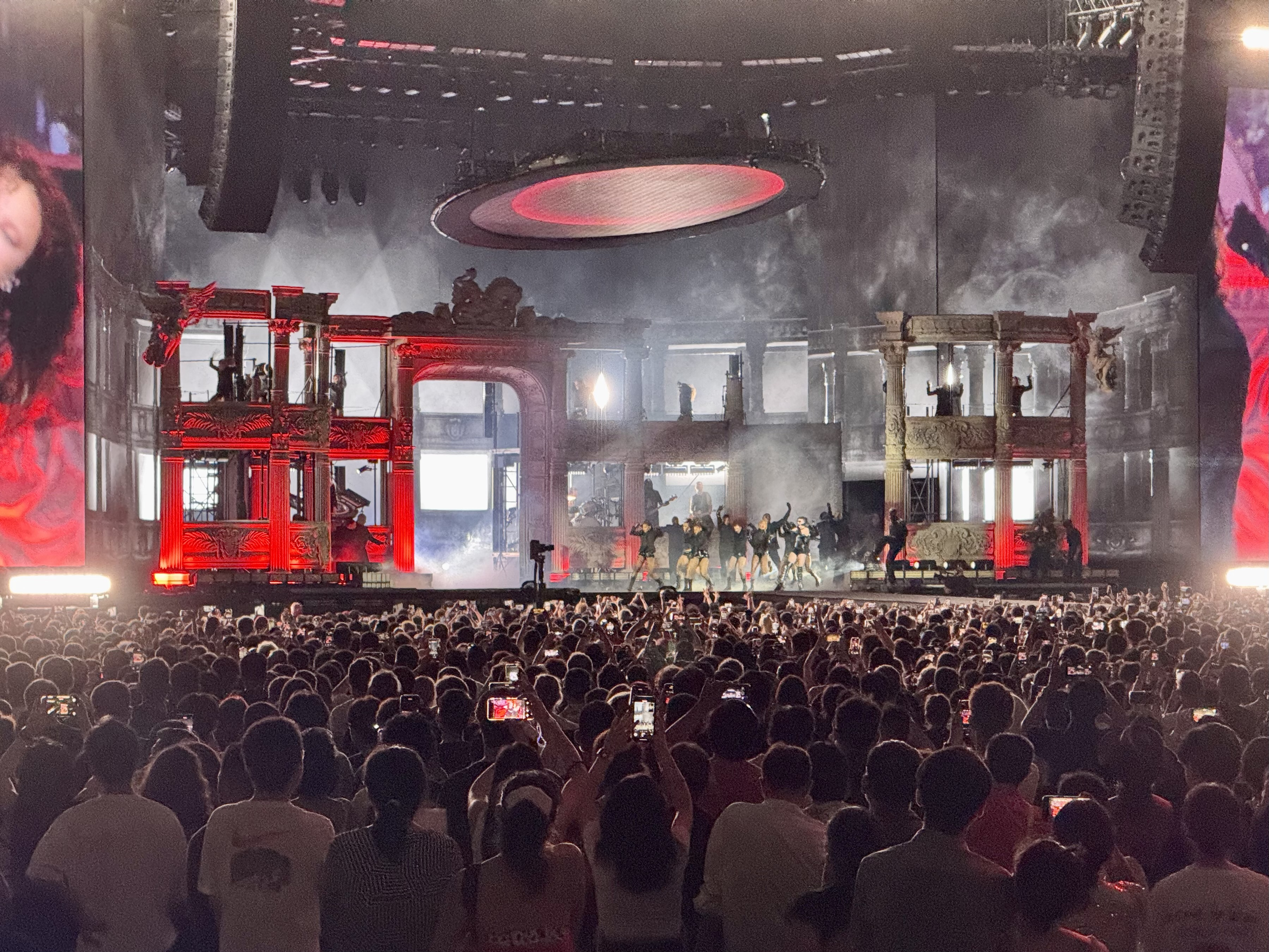
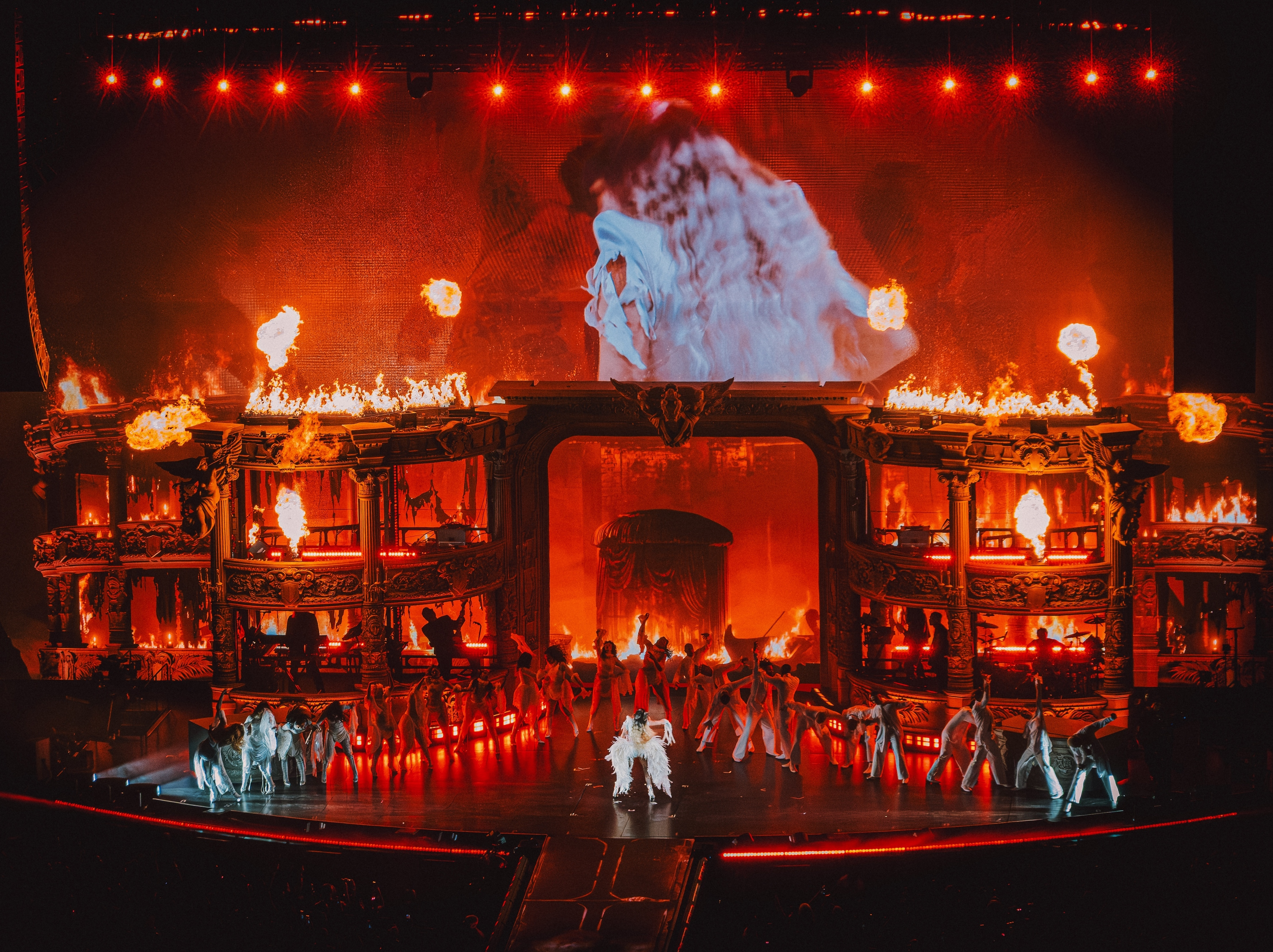
The stage with the opera house set in Singapore (top), and the structure engulfed in flames at a London show of the Mayhem Ball (bottom)

Both the initial promotional concerts and the tour were conceived as a theatrical show divided into acts, with a visual narrative inspired by opera and psychological drama. The tour was produced by Lady Gaga and Michael Polansky, and directed by Gaga and Ben Dalgleish of Human Person. Creative direction was handled by Gaga, Polansky, Human Person, and Goebel, who also served as choreographer. The production and stage design were created by Jason Ardizzone-West and Es Devlin. During the production phase, Gaga emphasized creative control and theatrical ambition, explaining that arenas allowed her to "control the details" in ways stadiums could not, while designing the production as a "theatrical and electrifying experience" intended to bring Mayhem to life as she envisioned it.

The main set piece is a Colosseum-like opera house with balconies and boxes, where Gaga, the band, and twenty-two dancers perform, featuring a pendulum-shaped catwalk that extends into the crowd as a B-stage and changes appearance throughout the show, with effects such as simulated blood flow or a multicolored parquet floor depending on the number. The show expanded on the operatic and psychological themes first introduced earlier that year, incorporating new choreography, custom-made costumes, and large-scale staging that emphasized transformation and chaos within the Mayhem universe.

In an interview with Variety, Goebel said the opening sequence was conceived as "a theatrical opera that would immediately establish the show's grand scale." She further explained envisioning colossal gowns that eventually evolved into a cage-like dress with dancers inside, creating a "really innovative and mic drop" moment, while also reimagining "Paparazzi" as "a slow, emotional rendition", with Gaga emerging from a sandbox representing a grave and using a flowing cape to symbolize "her soaring and finding her wings again". Goebel also revealed that the grave-like sandbox used in the second act was filled with cat litter. On the "Poker Face" performance, she explained that the chessboard was conceived as a recognizable visual device that audiences could immediately understand. After considering the concept for several songs, she felt it was particularly suited to "Poker Face", and the sequence was developed around the idea of a strategic "push and pull" between Gaga and an alternate version of herself. Goebel said that placing the familiar imagery of a chess game within Gaga's emotional storyline helped make the conflict between the two figures more visually direct and powerful.

In a later interview with Rolling Stone, Gaga described the show's conceptual structure as "a gothic dream" tied to themes she had "struggled with [her] whole life". She also added a redesigned version of "Shallow" - incorporating an unused electronic drum loop by co-writer Mark Ronson-during final rehearsals, explaining that she wanted to bring the song into her own aesthetic because "it doesn't have [her] signature style". Polansky explained that the team had considered how Gaga would reach the secondary stage, ultimately devising a gondola, pulled across the catwalk by dancers during "Shallow". The staging of the number drew inspiration from Andrew Lloyd Webber's 1986 musical The Phantom of the Opera, an interpretation Webber himself later endorsed.

=== Costume design ===
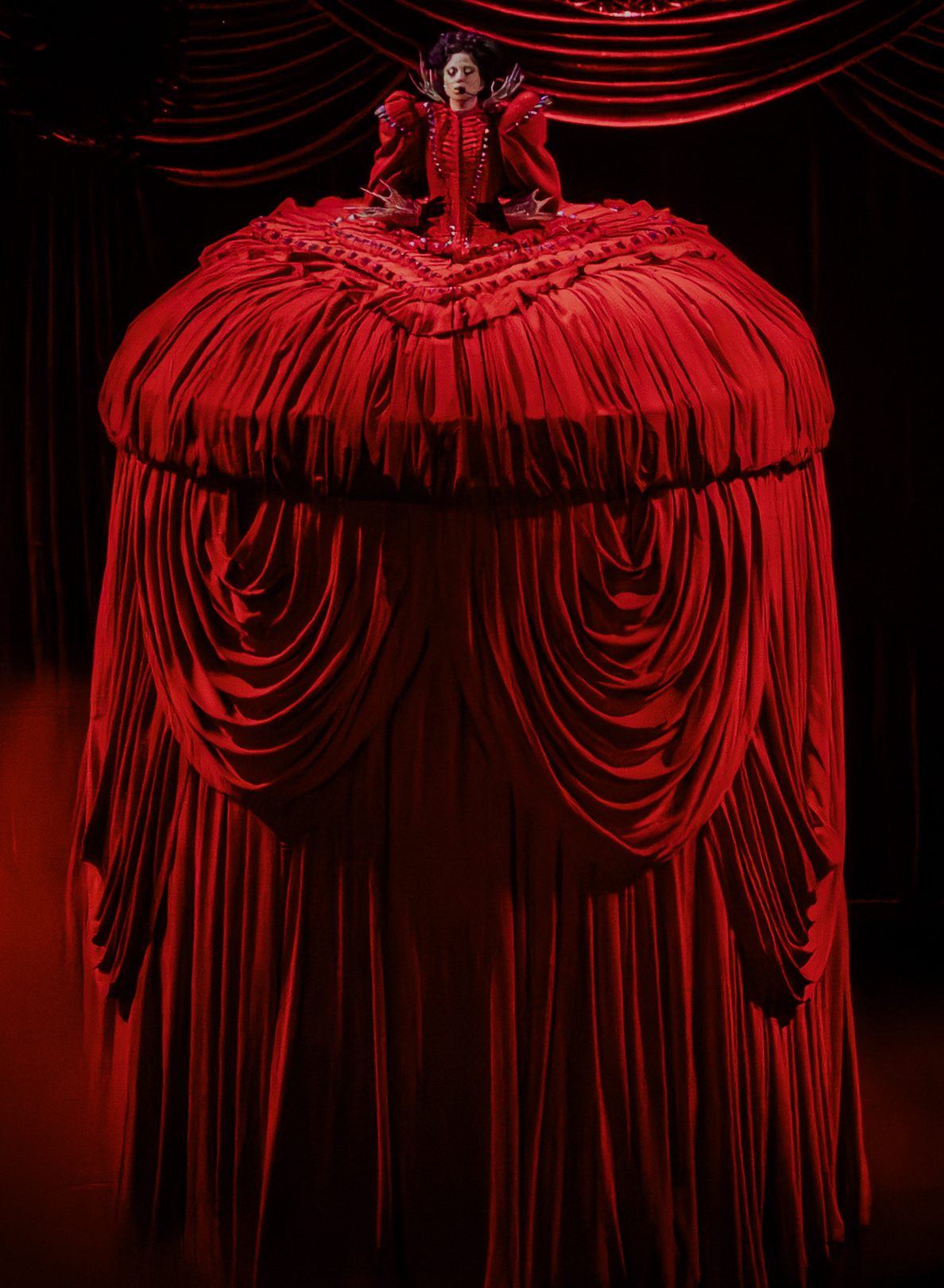
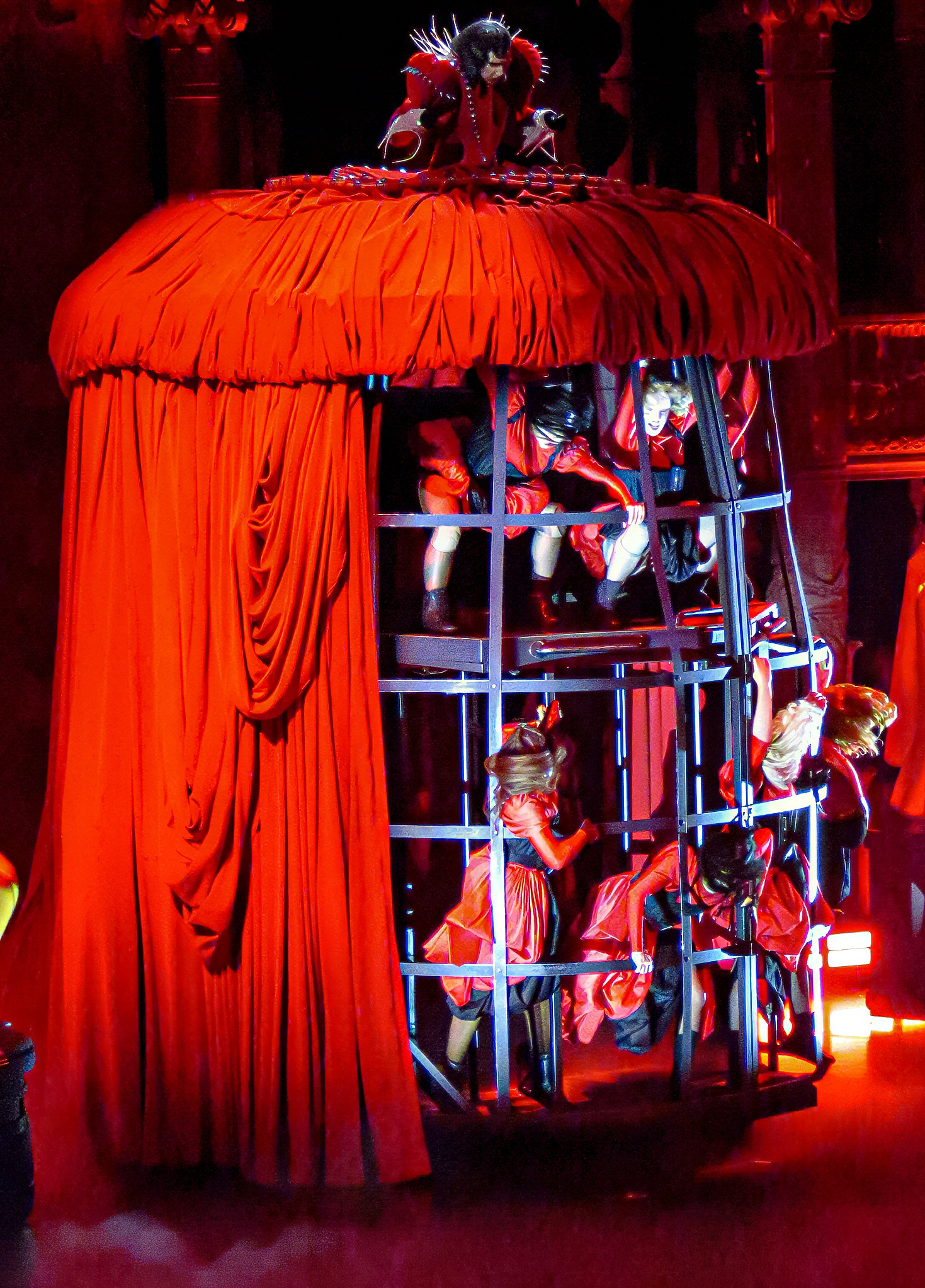
Gaga started both iterations of the show by performing "Bloody Mary" atop a multi-tiered Tudor-style red gown (left), which opened for "Abracadabra" to reveal a steel-frame cage enclosing her dancers (right).

For the Copacabana concert, Gaga incorporated the colors of the Brazilian flag into several costumes. Early in the first act, her red gown transformed to reveal a green look with a blue-and-gold stripe. In the third act, she wore another Brazil-inspired outfit in yellow, blue and green, while her dancers appeared in Brazilian national football team shirts. For the Singapore concerts, Gaga debuted a red-and-white dress for the first act, reflecting the country's national colors.

The costumes for the Mayhem Ball expanded on the aesthetic first introduced during the earlier promotional concerts, continuing Gaga's exploration of duality between darkness and purity. She worked with stylists Natali Germanotta (Gaga's sister), Hunter Clem and Hardstyle's Peri Rosenzweig and Nick Royal to curate gothic and operatic looks across four acts, combining religious iconography, sculptural silhouettes, and metallic constructions.

Custom designs were created by Sam Lewis, Athena Lawton, Manuel Albarran, Dilara Findikoglu, Francesco Risso for Marni, and Matières Fécales, with additional pieces by Seth Pratt, Gyouree Kim, Louis Verdad, and accessories from Chrome Hearts and Yaz XL. (Note: Part of the wardrobe previously donned during the outdoor promotional concerts. Attributed to multiple sources:) Footwear include custom rhinestone work by Disco Daddy Studio, Stuart Weitzman items and Steve Madden boots with handmade modifications by designer Lacey Dalimonte.

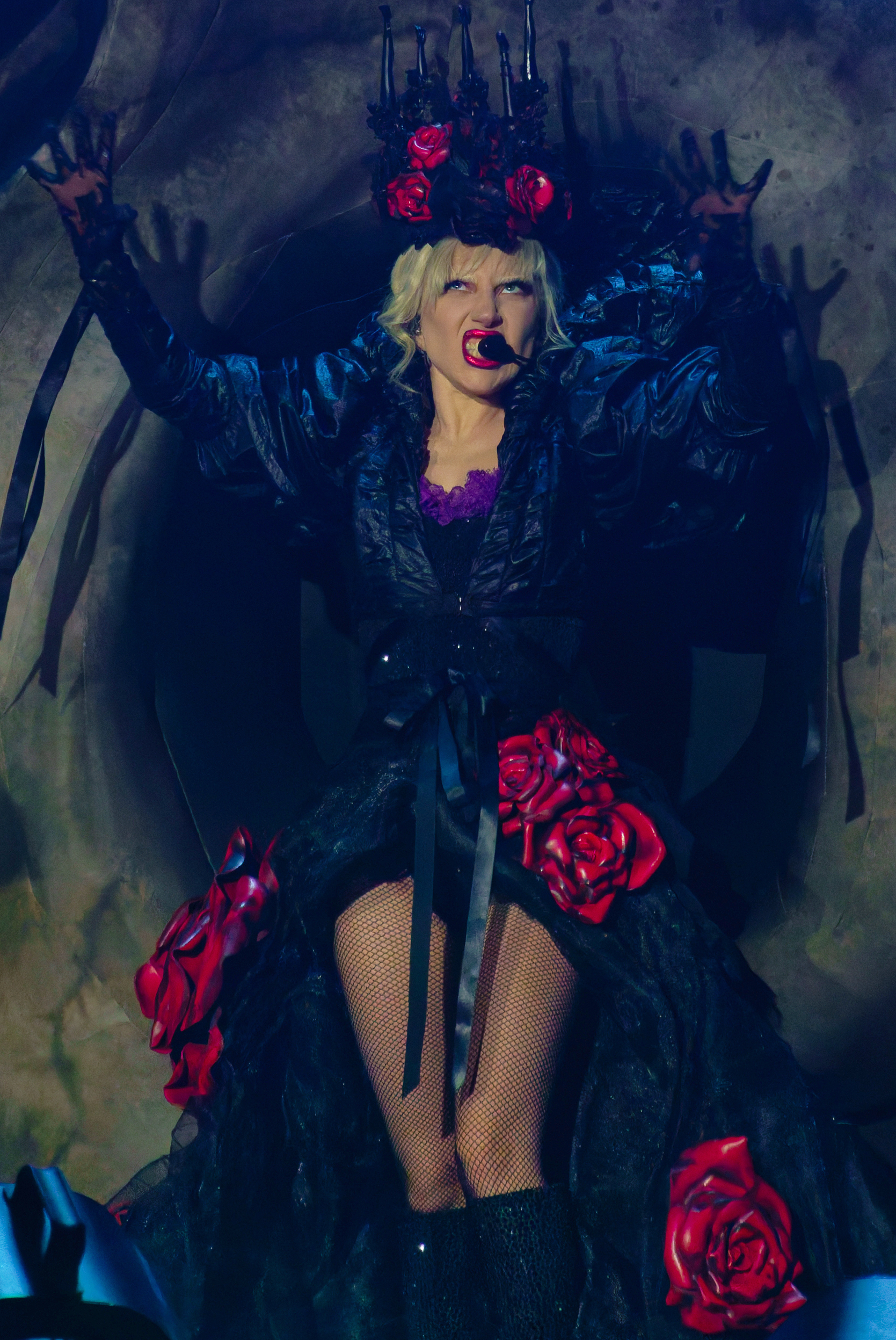
The revised show for the Mayhem Ball introduced several new outfits, including a rose-adorned black gown Gaga changed into for "Killah".

Several looks drew direct inspiration from historical haute couture and pop-cultural icons. The opening crimson gown, designed by Samuel Lewis, Athena Lawton and William Ramseur, was structured as a multi-story steel cage engineered by Jet Sets, incorporating Elizabethan corsetry and metallic studs in an homage to Thierry Mugler's 1985 Lady Macbeth design, and symbolizing the tension between control and chaos. Another key motif referenced the red lace gown from Alexander McQueen's Fall/Winter 1998 Joan collection—worn by Gaga at the 2009 MTV Video Music Awards—reframing her early fame within themes of sacrifice and rebirth, and subtly recalling the visual language of her early videos such as "Bad Romance".

The wardrobe also revisited her 2009 "Paparazzi" music video imagery, featuring armor-like bodysuits, metallic crutches, and a billowing cape that nodded to the visual motifs of the original video. Elements of McQueen's Spring/Summer 2005 It's Only a Game and Fall/Winter 2003 Scanners collections also informed later acts, blending chess-like visuals and surreal tailoring with psychological symbolism. Additional designs evoked Michael Jackson's Dangerous tour (1992) uniforms through military tailoring by Louis Verdad, while a hooded cloak inspired by The Phantom of the Opera (1986) appeared later in the show.

Throughout the tour she alternated between black leather bodysuits, spiked armor, and white gowns with illuminated trains and elongated prosthetic gloves, occasionally incorporating archival pieces like her original Born This Way (2011) jacket by Thomas Knight. Fashion publications such as Vogue, Cosmopolitan, W, Vanity Fair, and Variety highlighted the wardrobe's theatrical scale and "gothic glamour", noting its blend of haute couture and performance art, its recurring references to designers like McQueen and Mugler, and how each look "pushed the boundary between fashion and performance further."

== Synopsis ==
Top: Gaga in black after defeating her "Light" counterpart during "Poker Face". Bottom: the fallen "Light Gaga" performing "Disease" on a grave-like set. The first two acts largely mirror each other in the original and revamped versions of the show.

The concert opens with a visual interlude showing two versions of Gaga—a brunette in a crimson gown and her dark counterpart known as the Mistress of Mayhem—reciting the "Manifesto of Mayhem". Act I: Of Velvet and Vice begins with a brief orchestral rendition of "Bloody Mary", performed by Gaga as she emerges atop a 25-foot Tudor red gown. She then declares, "the category is dance or die" before transitioning into "Abracadabra", with the dancers encased in a steel-frame cage beneath her skirt. In the first act, Gaga appears as her "lady in red" dark side of herself whom she sings about on that song. As the track progresses, she descends to join her freed dancers, followed by a performance of "Judas". The tour version of the show also incorporates elements of "Aura" into the song. The performance of "Scheiße" follows, featuring oversized quill pens in a Last Supper-style tableau. For "Garden of Eden", the stage is illuminated in green lights, and Gaga plays the electric guitar. At the end of the song, she processes with her dancers toward the end of the catwalk and drops to her knees. During "Poker Face", the B-stage is transformed into a life-sized chessboard for a choreographed dance sequence featuring two opposing groups, one led by Gaga and the other by a veiled doppelganger dressed in white. The battle ends with red-Gaga's group prevailing, as she chants "Off with Her Head" toward the defeated figure.

In Act II: And She Fell into a Gothic Dream, Gaga performs "Perfect Celebrity" inside a grave-like setting, surrounded by skeletal figures partially buried in the sand. "Disease" follows, during which the skeletons begin to move, revealing themselves as her dancers, while her red alter-ego reappears to confront her before ending with Gaga's strangulation. Walking out of the grave on crutches and with a white fabric train billowing behind her, Gaga emotionally sings a stripped-back version of "Paparazzi". In the tour version, her long white train is illuminated with vivid colors towards the end of the song, and is followed by "LoveGame". Gaga makes her way to the balcony of the opera-house-inspired set, where she addresses the audience before performing "Alejandro". "The Beast" concludes the act in a shortened version during the original show, while the tour version features the song in its entirety, with Gaga playing an electric guitar.

The set diverges more between the original and revamped shows after the second act. For the original show, Act III: The Beautiful Nightmare That Knows Her Name commences with Gaga returning to stage in a blue corset. The performance of "Killah" sees her playing on a drum set, then for "Zombieboy", partner-dancing with skeletons along with her backup dancers. Next, a skull-clad keyboard is brought onstage, and Gaga performs a shortened solo rendition of "Die with a Smile". She starts singing "How Bad Do U Want Me" at the instrument, then moves along the runway by the second verse, wearing black horns. For Act IV: To Wake Her Is to Lose Her, Gaga dons a gray jacket and hot pants, and performs a mash-up of "Shadow of a Man" and "Kill for Love". Following a brief speech about self-acceptance, Gaga and the dancers perform "Born This Way", accompanied by fireworks. "Shallow" is sung on the piano, where Gaga also starts to perform "Vanish into You" before traversing the stage barricades to interact with the audience.

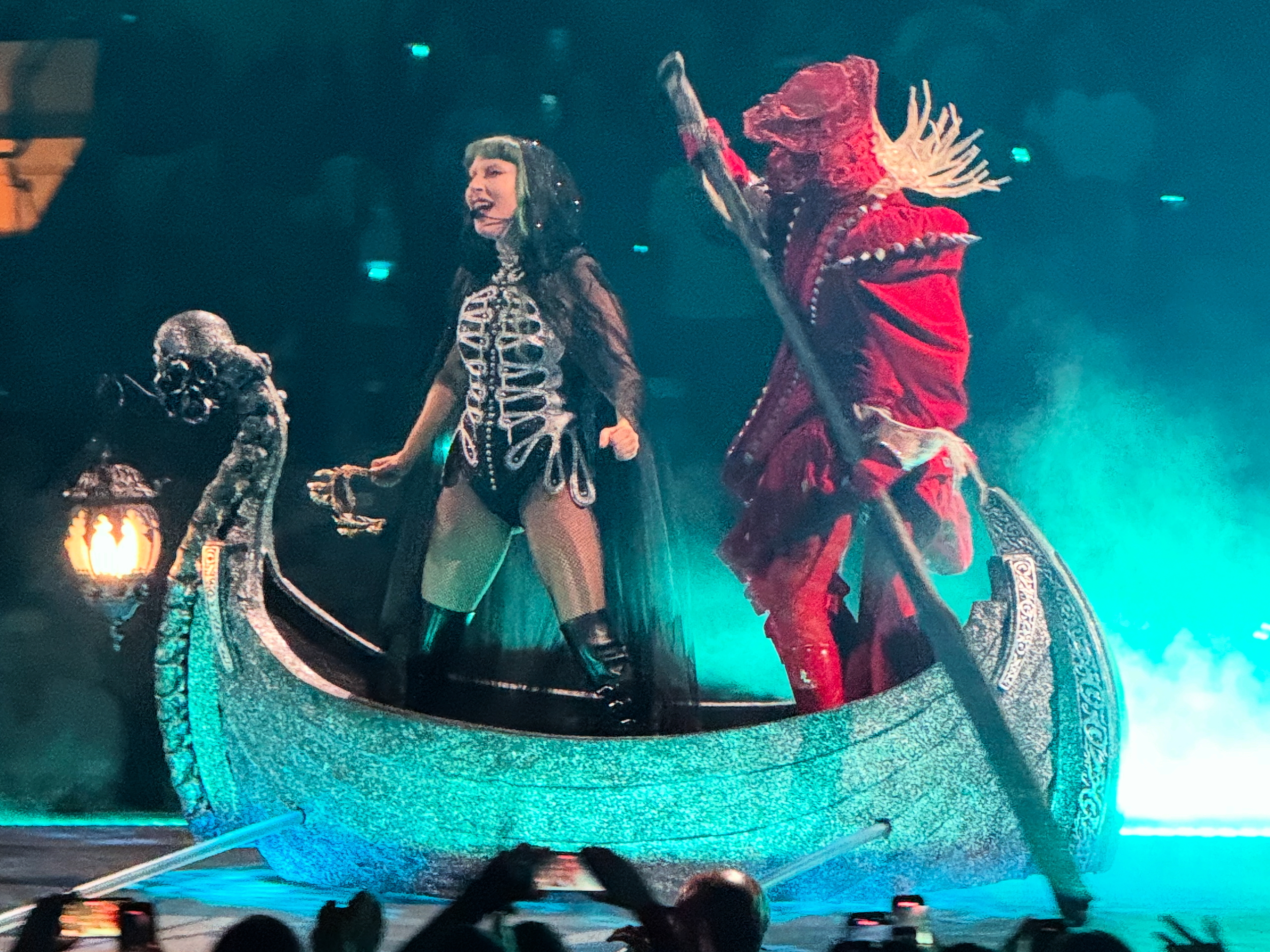
Gaga singing "Shallow" from a gondola during the Mayhem Ball, in a segment symbolizing the union of her dual identities. Their interplay is a central element of both incarnations of the show.

The revamped show's third act bears the same name and opens with Gaga stepping out of a giant skull in a gothic outfit decorated with roses to perform "Killah", with the stage illuminated in purple lights. For "Zombieboy", she is accompanied by Gomez Addams-inspired dancers dressed in purple jackets, while the screens are projecting audience members with glowing green eyes resembling zombies. She changes into a voluminous white dress for "The Dead Dance", and walks down a staircase during "LoveDrug". Her dress is gradually removed as shortened versions of "Applause" and "Just Dance" close the segment. In the completely revised fourth act, titled Every Chessboard Has Two Queens, Gaga wears a military-style tailcoat to perform "Shadow of a Man" and "Kill for Love", this time as standalone songs. She continues with "Summerboy", playing on an electric guitar, while surrounded by her dancers in a steamy nightclub setting. "Born This Way" follows with its original choreography and some additional vogueing elements. Clad in a black hooded cloak, Gaga performs "Million Reasons" as a plea to the Mistress of Mayhem, who reappears atop the red gown from the opening act. The scene marks a transitional moment in the show, as the light and dark versions of Gaga face each other before joining hands in the center of the stage, signifying their coexistence in harmony. For "Shallow", which receives a moodier arrangement, the pair board a Venetian-style gondola illuminated by a lantern. The gondola, paddled by the red-masked figure, carries Gaga along the catwalk to the B-stage. Gaga then performs "Die with a Smile" on piano, followed by surprise songs on select dates. Closing the fourth act, Gaga again interacts with fans near the barricades, singing "Vanish into You".

The finale at both versions of the show, titled Eternal Aria of the Monster Heart, features a recorded speech that symbolizes the union of Gaga and the Mistress of Mayhem, as Gaga declares, "We are monsters, and monsters never die". It is followed by "Bad Romance", where Gaga and her dancers wear white Elizabethan attire and red plague doctor outfits in a scene simulating a medical operation, as the credits roll on screen and the opera house set appears to burn. For the tour shows, "How Bad Do U Want Me" is moved to the very end as an encore performance, during which Gaga removes her costume and makeup while singing backstage, with the camera following her return to the stage to bow with the dancers and thank the audience.

== Critical reception ==
=== Original shows ===
The original version of the show received widespread critical acclaim, with particular praise directed at its theatricality, visual presentation and Gaga's performance. Paolo Ragusa of Consequence compared the production favorably to Beyoncé's 2018 Coachella set, describing Gaga as an "unparalleled theatrical performer" and praising the precision and intensity of the production. Lyndsey Havens of Billboard interpreted the narrative as a "commentary on fame and performance" and the demands of sustaining both. Rolling Stone's Tomás Mier found Gaga's storytelling "transformative" and considered the spectacle a demonstration of her stature as a pop performer. Adrian Horton of The Guardian described it as a fully realized vision that demonstrated Gaga's experience as a performer and placed its production and execution above that of her peers.

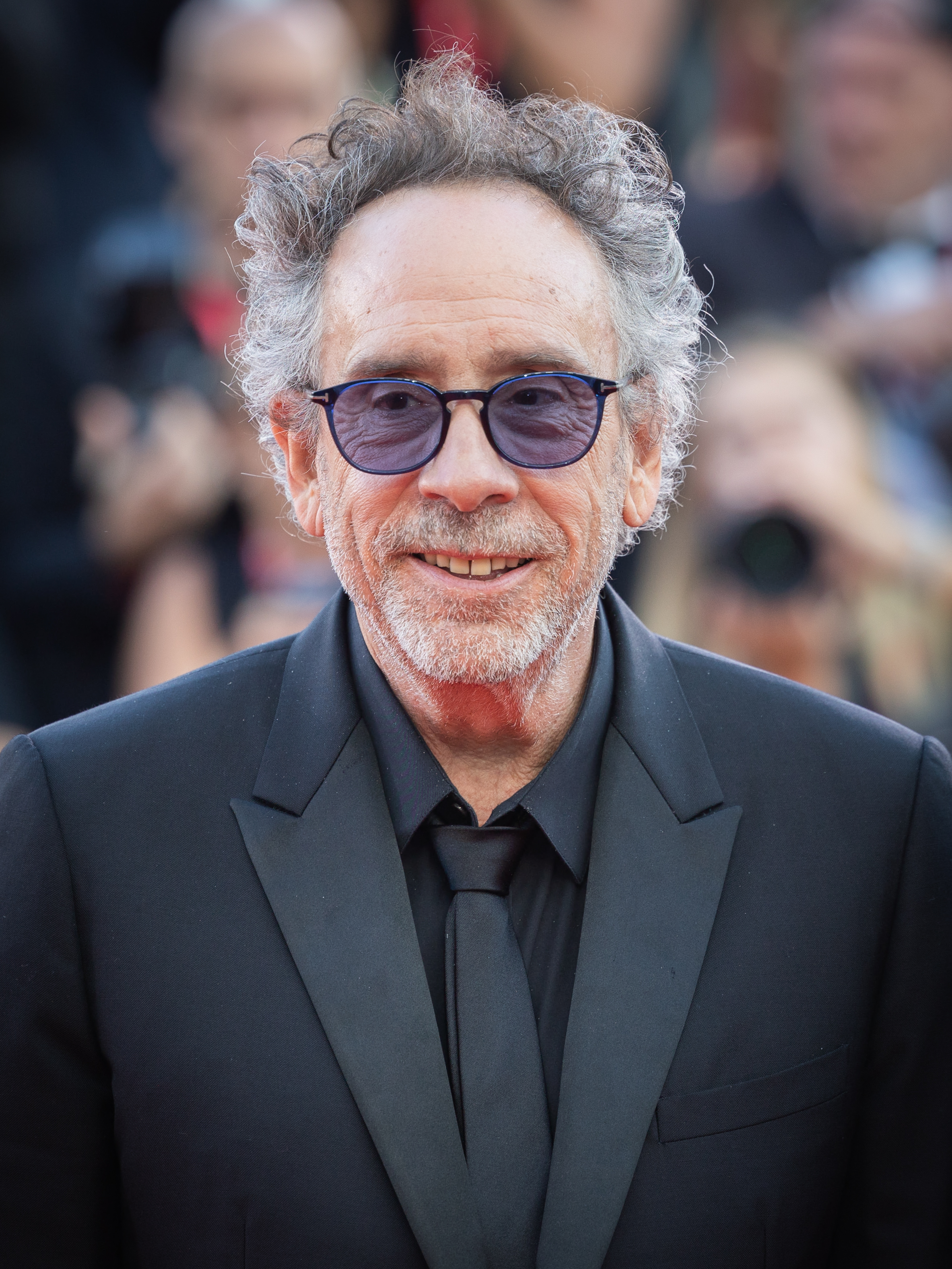
The show's gothic aesthetic drew comparisons to the work of Tim Burton (pictured).

The show's visual style and theatrical influences were often singled out for praise. Chris Willman of Variety praised Gaga's vocals and costumes and characterized the production as "equal parts bizarro and sentimental". Mikael Wood of the Los Angeles Times was less convinced by the overarching narrative, but felt the individual set pieces were sufficiently "vivid and funny and weird" to compensate, while also commending Gaga's vocals. Jamie Fullerton of The Daily Telegraph described the production as a "Tim Burton meets Rocky Horror high-concept, high-camp goth opera", though he felt the third act briefly lost momentum. Jorge Emilio Sánchez of Excélsior likewise emphasized the dark atmosphere, fashion and stage design, comparing the latter to a painting by Salvador Dalí.

Other reviewers similarly focused on the balance between spectacle and music. Leonardo Lichote of Folha de S.Paulo considered the prevalence of the visual over the musical "undeniable" and praised the arrangements for reinforcing the show's dramatic qualities. O Globo likewise commended the production and fashion design, while Correio da Manhã's Lanna Silveira praised Gaga's vocals, stage presence and increasing engagement with the audience, though she found her connection with the crowd lacking during the first act. She also criticized "Die with a Smile" as underutilized and felt that "How Bad Do You Want Me" disrupted the concert's momentum. Correio Braziliense interpreted the show's central narrative as a conflict between Lady Gaga, representing the singer's fame, and Stefani Germanotta, the person behind the persona.

The theatrical format remained a recurring point of praise. Eddino Abdul Hadi of The Straits Times noted the "tight choreography", elaborate staging, props and numerous costume changes, while Nylon Singapore regarded it as "a theatrical experience that transcends the traditional concert format." Hazeeq Sukri of CNA Lifestyle described the show as a "polished theatrical production" that demonstrated Gaga's growth as an artist, and Mel Wang of Rolling Stone Philippines credited Gaga's showmanship with turning the concert "into a world of her own".

=== The Mayhem Ball ===
The revised show for the Mayhem Ball received further acclaim for its theatricality and Gaga's performance, with particular praise directed at the production design, costumes and choreography. Tomás Mier of Rolling Stone regarded the tour as an expansion and refinement of the original production, writing that Gaga had "expanded it, sharpened it" and fully realized the gothic concept introduced in the earlier shows; he also felt that the arena setting made the production more intimate. Joe Lynch of Billboard praised the way material from Mayhem was combined with Gaga's earlier dance songs, describing the result as a "theatrical, electric and delicious live affair". Melissa Ruggieri of USA Today felt the show's theatricality could rival a Broadway musical and praised the way its format accommodated Gaga's stylistically varied catalogue. Steven J. Horowitz of Variety similarly praised the precision of the production and Gaga's versatility, calling it a "breathless, finely-tuned spectacular".

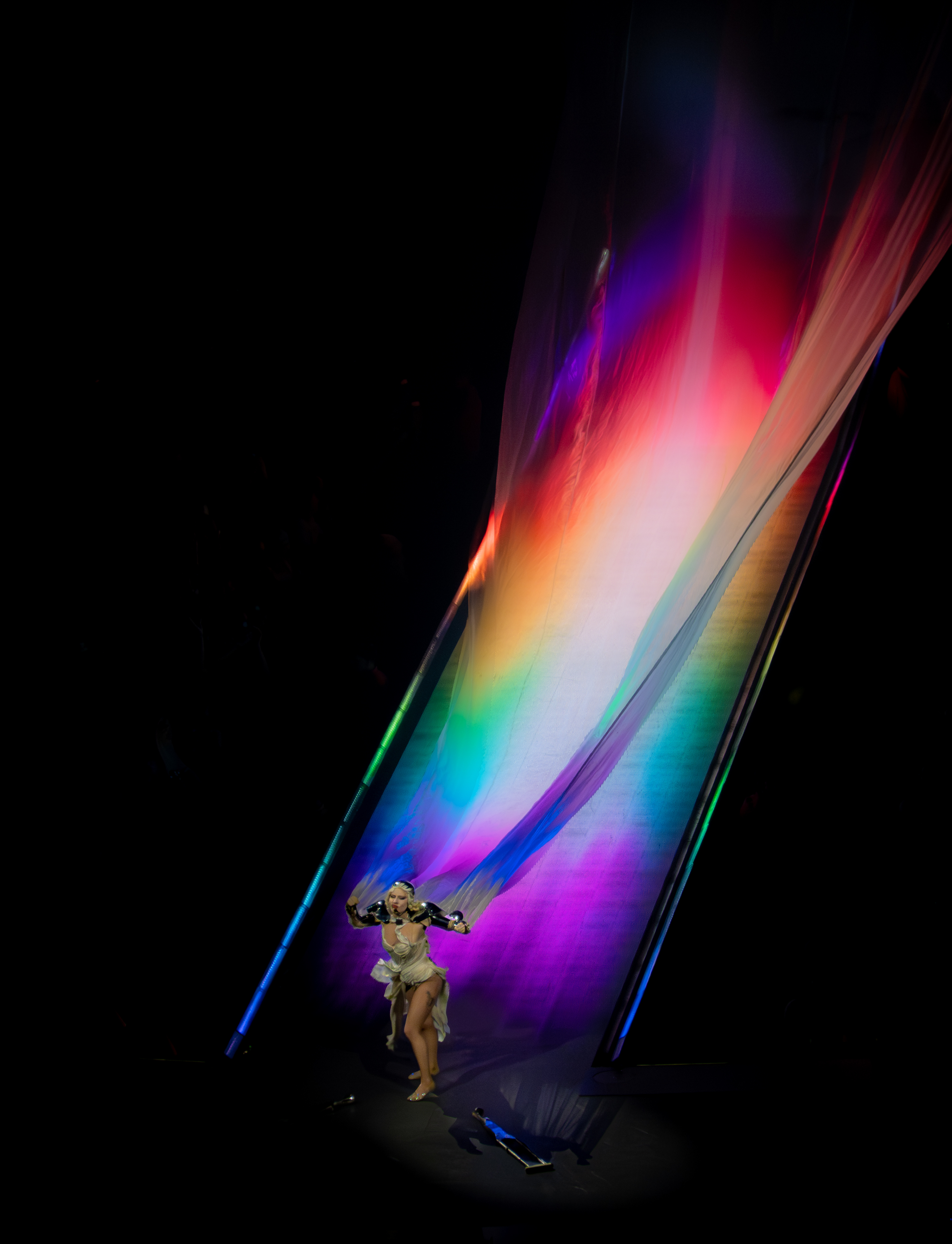
The performance of "Paparazzi" was staged similarly in both versions of the show, with Gaga walking on crutches as billowing white fabric trailed behind her; for the Mayhem Ball, it was illuminated with vivid colors. The sequence was singled out as a visual highlight by several critics.

Several critics viewed the tour's production as a culmination of Gaga's career and stagecraft. Lindsay Zoladz of The New York Times considered Gaga to be "at the peak of her powers", praising the show's combination of theatricality, humor and precision and its connection between her past and present work. Drew Gillis of The A.V. Club called it "a fan's dream" and considered its "over-the-top spectacle" reminiscent of Gaga's Artpop era, while acknowledging the relative intimacy afforded by arenas. Anthony D'Alessandro of Deadline viewed the production as a celebration of the elements that define Gaga and compared its ambition favorably with the Monster Ball Tour. Adam Maidment of Manchester Evening News considered the tour a career highlight, and singled out the stripped-back "How Bad Do You Want Me" finale as an effective contrast to the preceding spectacle, calling it "a beautiful finish".

The production's gothic, operatic and maximalist aesthetic was a recurring focus of reviews. Adam White of The Independent named it "the concert of the year", praising its elaborate construction, costume changes and balance of bombast and sincerity. Alexis Petridis of The Guardian observed that there was "always something astonishing to look at", emphasizing the production's deliberately exaggerated and outrageous visual staging. NME characterized the performance as "impeccable camp theater from a true pop icon", while Emily Bootle of The i Paper described it as "an extravaganza of gothic and operatic pop theater". Robert van Gijssel of de Volkskrant considered the show "an overwhelming and exhausting piece of musical theatre", praising its operatic staging and exploration of Gaga's inner chaos. Olivier Nuc of Le Figaro likewise emphasized the "baroque and gothic" aesthetic, high-energy choreography and maximalist staging, while Odile de Plas of Télérama praised its elegance, humor and exploration of duality.

Gaga's vocals and musicianship were also frequently singled out. Neil McCormick of The Daily Telegraph argued that, despite the scale of the surrounding spectacle, Gaga remained at its center through her vocal and musical abilities. Will Hodgkinson of The Times praised Gaga as an "extremely hard working pop star", highlighting her ability to sing live while performing demanding choreography and arguing that the show's straightforward pop music was elevated by the "power of performance". He was less convinced by her guitar playing, however, remarking during "Garden of Eden" that she appeared to be "wearing a guitar, if not necessarily playing it". The Sydney Morning Herald's Vyshnavee Wijekumar praised Gaga's "passionate live vocal" delivery, while Bryget Chrisfield of Rolling Stone Australia described Gaga as being "at the peak of her powers", complimenting her vocal strength and the production's theatrical ambition.

==== Accolades ====
The Mayhem Ball received several accolades and nominations from major industry organizations and music publications. In 2025, the tour won Tour of the Year at the Nylon Nights Awards. For the 2026 award season, the production earned two nominations at the Pollstar Awards, including Major Tour of the Year and Pop Tour of the Year, and was also nominated for Tour of the Year at the American Music Awards. Additional recognition included a nomination for The Top Tour Award at The Arthur Awards and Favorite Tour Style at the 2026 iHeartRadio Music Awards. International branches of Ticketmaster also recognized the tour, with a win for International Concert of the Year in France, alongside nominations for Best Production Design and Best Tour of the Year in Italy and Spain, respectively.

Accolades
Award/Organization	Year	Category	Result	Ref.
American Music Awards	2026	Tour of the Year	Nominated	
The Arthur Awards	2026	The Top Tour Award	Nominated	
Grindr Unwrapped Awards	2025	Tour of the Year	Won	
iHeartRadio Music Awards	2026	Favorite Tour Style	Nominated	
Nylon Nights Awards	2025	Tour of the Year	Won	
Pollstar Awards	2026	Major Tour of the Year	Nominated	
Pollstar Awards	2026	Pop Tour of the Year	Nominated	
Ticketmaster Awards (France)	2026	International Concert of the Year	Won	
Ticketmaster Awards (Italy)	2026	Best Production Design	Nominated	
Ticketmaster Awards (Spain)	2026	Best Tour of the Year	Nominated	

== Commercial performance and impact ==
Following the last concert in the series on April 13, 2026, Billboard reported a final gross of $419.5 million and nearly two million tickets sold across 93 shows, including the entirety of the tour and the ticketed promotional concerts in Mexico City and Singapore.

=== Original shows ===
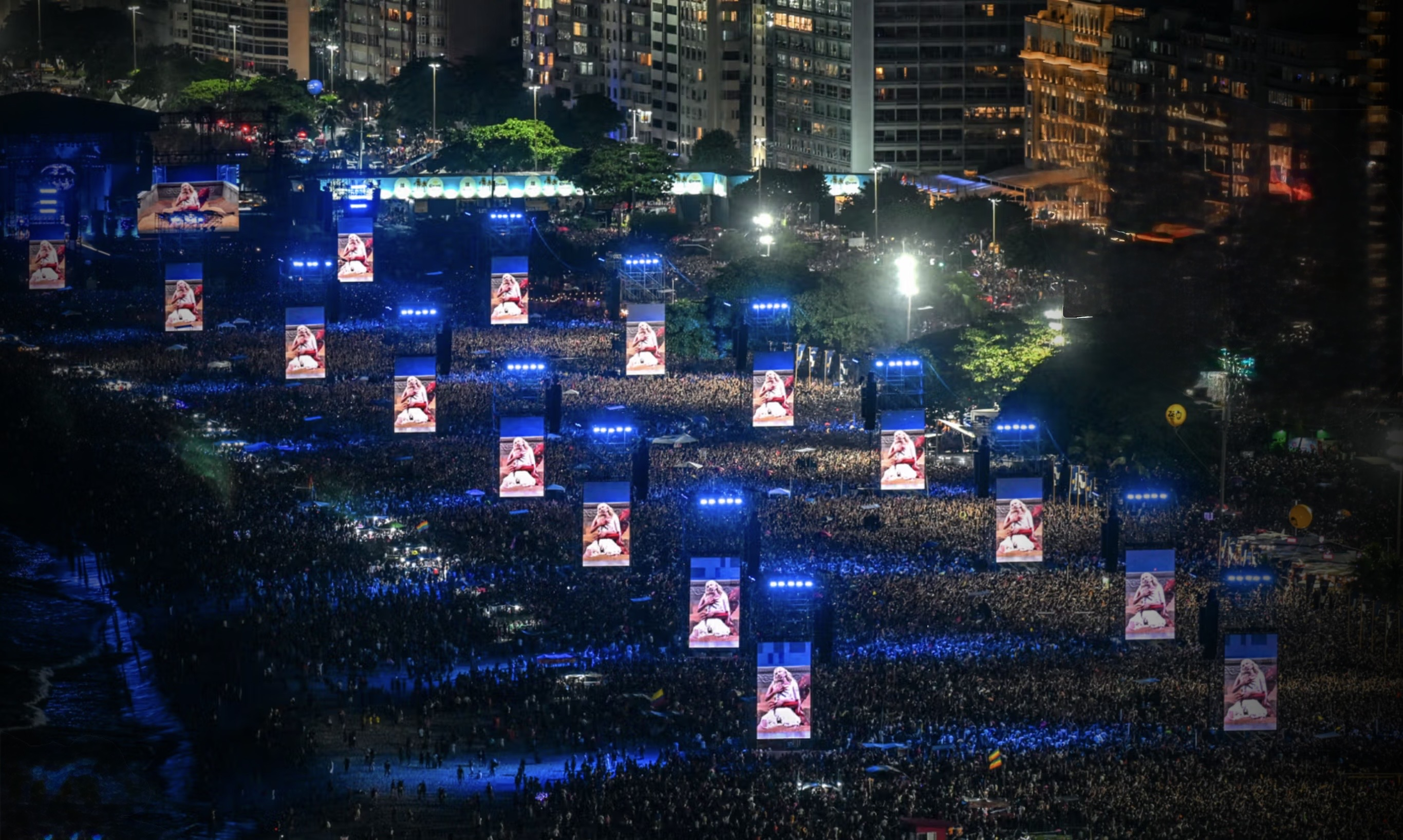
Aerial view of the crowd during the Copacabana Beach show (Rio de Janeiro). The free concert gathered an estimated 2.5 million people, becoming the largest of Gaga's career and by a female artist.

For the first Mexico City show, Banamex holders gained access to a presale on March 6, followed by a sale to the general public the next day. Due to high demand, a second date for April 27 was added, with presale access granted to the bank's clients on March 11. Tickets for both concerts sold out immediately. Ticket presales for the Singapore shows began on March 18 for Mastercard cardholders, with queue numbers exceeding 2 million. High site traffic caused login issues and crashes. Minutes after tickets went on sale, ticket scalpers listed event tickets on third-party platforms such as Carousell and Stubhub for inflated prices, including a listing of S$30,000 for VIP packages. Additional presales were scheduled for event partner Klook on March 19 and for KrisFlyer and Live Nation on March 20. The four sold-out shows ultimately grossed $10.2 million per night, Gaga's highest single-night gross at the time. Altogether, the six ticketed shows held in Mexico City and Singapore grossed $56.6 million and sold more than 300,000 tickets.

Attendance for the Copacabana Beach concert was estimated at 2.5 million people, making it the largest show of Gaga's career, as well as breaking the record for largest audience ever for a concert by a female artist. The concert generated an estimated R$600 million (US$109 million) for Rio de Janeiro's local economy, according to the city's government. Following the concert, Gaga's streams on Spotify increased by 60% in Brazil over seven days, with 16 of her songs appearing in the platform's national Top 200 by the following day. In Singapore, the concerts generated significant activity in tourism, hospitality, and food and beverage, with regional hotel bookings on Agoda increasing by 358% following their announcement. Singapore Airlines also anticipated higher first-quarter earnings from increased travel associated with the concerts. Analysts estimated that the Singapore shows generated up to S$300 million in revenue across various economic sectors.

=== The Mayhem Ball ===
Originally planned to have 32 dates, promoter Live Nation added an additional 13 concerts across multiple cities, due to the demand. On April 3, 2025, it was reported the tour sold out during the first day of general sale. In an initial sales report, Billboard suggested the Mayhem Ball could be Gaga's biggest tour in over a decade, with an estimation of "$100 million to surging toward $125 million". They also said the decision to move from stadiums to arenas could possibly "drive higher prices than on the Chromatica Ball, with far fewer seats available each night".

The first North American leg of the tour far exceeded the commercial performance of her past arena tours, such as the Born This Way Ball (2012–2013) and 2014's ArtRave: The Artpop Ball. The first run of shows in the US and Canada grossed over $103 million with only 27 dates reported, nearly crossing initial estimates projected for the entire tour. Thus, this leg became Gaga's highest grossing run of shows across any of her tours or residencies in any territory. According to Billboard, the tour could "potentially [triple]" their initial estimates and cross $300 million following the performance of the first leg and the addition of further arena shows in North America and stadium shows in Japan and Australia.

As of late 2025, the tour had grossed $166 million from 35 reported shows and ranked as the highest-grossing pop tour of the year by a female artist and second overall on Billboard's year-end Boxscore charts, which covered the period between October 1, 2024, and September 30, 2025. In March 2026, the boxscore figures were reported with a total gross of $296 million from 68 dates and a total of 1.4 million tickets sold. During the first half of the 2026 Boxscore tracking year, which ran from October 1, 2025, to March 31, 2026, the tour grossed $236.2 million and sold 1.2 million tickets across 52 shows. It consequently topped the midyear Top Tours chart and achieved the highest midyear gross in Billboard Boxscore history.

The Mayhem Ball became Gaga's highest-grossing tour and the ninth highest-grossing concert tour by a female artist in history, rising to sixth when the warm-up concerts were included.

== Political statements ==
During the concert at the Tokyo Dome on January 29, 2026, Gaga addressed the audience and spoke out against US Immigration and Customs Enforcement (ICE). She expressed concern for immigrants and communities in the United States, saying her "heart is aching" for "the people, the children, the families… who are being mercilessly targeted by ICE", and referred to the fear experienced by entire communities. In her remarks, Gaga also mentioned the recent shooting of intensive care nurse Alex Pretti by US Customs and Border Protection (CBP) agents in Minneapolis, Minnesota, and said that when communities lose their sense of safety and belonging, "it breaks something in all of us". She then dedicated "Come to Mama", from her 2016 album Joanne, to those who are suffering or feeling alone, and called for a return to "a place of safety and peace and accountability", expressing hope that political leaders would change their course of action.

== Bomb threat ==
Operation Fake Monster is a codename given by Brazilian police to an alleged plot to bomb the Copacabana Beach concert on May 3, 2025. According to police, the group behind the plot specifically attempted to recruit teenagers with violent content and anti-LGBT hate speech, and took the form of a collective social media challenge. The codename was derived from Gaga's fans, who call themselves "little monsters", as the suspects allegedly used fake social media profiles to pose as members of the fan community, according to the Ministry of Justice, which collaborated in the operation.

Rio state police began an investigation after receiving a tip-off from police intelligence. During the event, 5,000 police and military officers acted as security, with the aid of drones and facial recognition. Attendees had to pass through metal detectors. The investigation led to 15 homes being searched in the states of Rio de Janeiro, Mato Grosso, Rio Grande do Sul, and São Paulo, and a number of electronic devices being searched. Two search warrants were carried out with assistance from the U.S. Consulate. Two individuals were arrested prior to the start of the concert. The concert faced no disruptions due to the threat. Gaga's team were not told of the bomb plot, only learning of it through media reports on the morning of May 4.

As of May 4, 2025, the investigation has resulted in one adult being arrested on illegal weapons charges and one teenager being charged with possessing child pornography. Authorities also arrested and charged a third person with terrorism, who they accused of planning to perform a Satanic human sacrifice of a child or baby during the concert.

== Set list ==
=== Original shows ===
This set list is from the April 11, 2025, concert at Indio, California. It may not represent all concerts.

Act I: Of Velvet and Vice

1. "Bloody Mary"
2. "Abracadabra"
3. "Judas"
4. "Scheiße"
5. "Garden of Eden"
6. "Poker Face" (followed by an interlude of "Abracadabra (Gesaffelstein remix)")

Act II: And She Fell into a Gothic Dream

7. "Perfect Celebrity"
8. "Disease"
9. "Paparazzi"
10. "Alejandro"
11. "The Beast"

Act III: The Beautiful Nightmare That Knows Her Name

12. "Killah"
13. "Zombieboy"
14. "Die with a Smile"
15. "How Bad Do U Want Me"

Act IV: To Wake Her Is to Lose Her

16. "Shadow of a Man" (with elements of "Kill for Love") (Note: While sources related to the Coachella show either don't mention "Kill for Love" or list it as a standalone performance, sources from subsequent concerts specify that only elements of the song were incorporated into "Shadow of a Man". Later sources from Gaga's the Mayhem Ball tour highlight that performance as the first time she performed the full song.)
17. "Born This Way"
18. "Shallow"
19. "Vanish into You"

Finale: Eternal Aria of the Monster Heart

20. "Bad Romance"

==== Notes ====
- For the first Coachella show, Gaga was joined on stage for "Killah" by Gesaffelstein.
- From the first Mexico City show, to the second Singapore show, "Blade of Grass" was added to the set list, preceding "Shallow".
- At the third and fourth Singapore shows, "Always Remember Us This Way" was added to the set list, preceding "Shallow".

=== The Mayhem Ball ===
This set list is from the July 16, 2025, concert in Paradise. (Note: Labeled as Las Vegas in promotional material.) It may not represent all concerts.

Act I: Of Velvet and Vice

1. "Bloody Mary"
2. "Abracadabra"
3. "Judas" / "Aura" (medley)
4. "Scheiße"
5. "Garden of Eden"
6. "Poker Face"

Act II: And She Fell into a Gothic Dream

7. "Perfect Celebrity"
8. "Disease"
9. "Paparazzi"
10. "LoveGame"
11. "Alejandro"
12. "The Beast"

Act III: The Beautiful Nightmare That Knows Her Name

13. "Killah"
14. "Zombieboy"
15. "LoveDrug"
16. "Applause"
17. "Just Dance"

Act IV: Every Chessboard Has Two Queens

18. "Shadow of a Man"
19. "Kill for Love"
20. "Summerboy"
21. "Born This Way"
22. "Million Reasons"
23. "Shallow"
24. "Die with a Smile"
25. "Vanish into You"

Finale: Eternal Aria of the Monster Heart

26. "Bad Romance"

Encore

27. "How Bad Do U Want Me"

==== Surprise songs ====
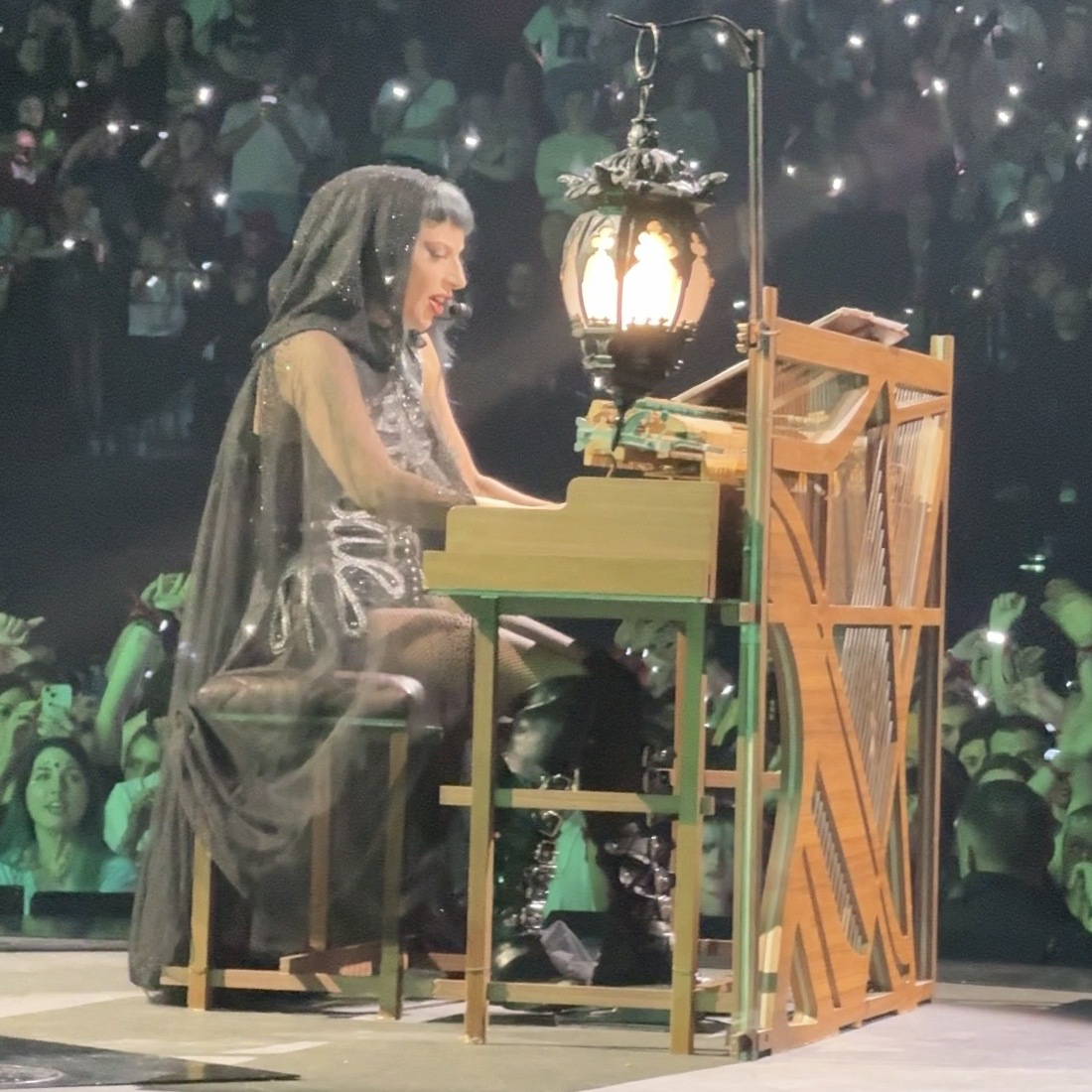
Gaga performing "Hair" during a concert in Lyon, France. The majority of stops on the Mayhem Ball tour involved surprise songs performed on piano.

On the majority of the tour, Gaga performed one or two surprise songs (Note: Gaga first introduced a surprise song segment during her Madison Square Garden shows in New York City, beginning on August 22, 2025. On one occasion, at the final show in Paris, France, she performed three surprise songs on piano.) on the piano (with the band sometimes playing along) after "Die with a Smile", from several of her albums. These included,

- from the album The Fame (2008): "Brown Eyes";
- from the album The Fame Monster (2009): "Speechless" and "Dance in the Dark";
- from the album Born This Way (2011): "Hair", "Marry the Night", "The Edge of Glory", and "You and I";
- from the album Joanne (2016): "Joanne", "Grigio Girls", "Come to Mama", "Hey Girl", and "Angel Down";
- from the album A Star Is Born (2018): "Always Remember Us This Way" and "Is That Alright?";
- from the album Chromatica (2020): "Rain on Me" and "1000 Doves";
- from the album Top Gun: Maverick (2022): "Hold My Hand";
- from the album Mayhem (2025): "Abracadabra", "How Bad Do U Want Me", and "Blade of Grass";
- and the unreleased song "Brooklyn Nights", which was considered for Gaga's 2013 album, Artpop.

Furthermore, at each show, Gaga played a surprise song from tape during the encore, occasionally singing along to it. The selections have included tracks from all her major pop album releases, (Note: The Fame, The Fame Monster, Born This Way, Artpop, Joanne, A Star Is Born, Chromatica, Mayhem, and The Devil Wears Prada 2.) as well as standalone singles and unreleased songs. During the July 22, 2025, concert in San Francisco, "Crazy Train" (1980) by Ozzy Osbourne was played at the end of the show, as a tribute to Osbourne following his death.

==== Notes ====
- "The Dead Dance" was included in the set list following "Zombieboy" between September 11, 2025, in Toronto and February 23, 2026, in Inglewood, California.
- During the September 29, 2025, concert in London, Wednesday cast members Emma Myers and Evie Templeton joined Gaga on stage for the performance of "The Dead Dance" and "LoveDrug".

== Broadcast and recording ==
Gaga's concerts at Coachella's first and second week were both streamed online on the festival's official YouTube channel. The show in Rio de Janeiro was broadcast live on television by TV Globo and Multishow and streamed on Globoplay. The telecast drew 34.5 million viewers.

At the Mayhem Ball tour's September 6, 2025, concert in New York City, "Abracadabra" and "The Dead Dance" were performed consecutively before the main show, and filmed for the 2025 MTV Video Music Awards.

The February 2026 Mayhem Ball shows at Kia Forum were filmed for a concert film project.

== Concert dates ==
Original run of shows
Date	City	Country	Venue	Attendance	Revenue	Ref.
April 11, 2025 (Note: The concerts on April 11 and 18, 2025, at the Empire Polo Club in Indio were part of the Coachella Valley Music and Arts Festival.)	Indio	United States	Empire Polo Club	—N/a	—N/a	
April 18, 2025	Indio	United States	Empire Polo Club	—N/a	—N/a	
April 26, 2025	Mexico City	Mexico	Estadio GNP Seguros	117,174	$15,516,599	
April 27, 2025	Mexico City	Mexico	Estadio GNP Seguros	117,174	$15,516,599	
May 3, 2025 (Note: The concert in Rio de Janeiro on May 3, 2025, was a free access show as a part of Todo Mundo no Rio.)	Rio de Janeiro	Brazil	Copacabana Beach	2,500,000	—N/a	
May 18, 2025	Singapore		Singapore National Stadium	192,807	$40,809,884	
May 19, 2025	Singapore		Singapore National Stadium	192,807	$40,809,884	
May 21, 2025	Singapore		Singapore National Stadium	192,807	$40,809,884	
May 24, 2025	Singapore		Singapore National Stadium	192,807	$40,809,884	

The Mayhem Ball dates
Date	City	Country	Venue	Attendance	Revenue
July 16, 2025	Paradise	United States	T-Mobile Arena	44,530 / 44,530	$11,094,860
July 18, 2025	Paradise	United States	T-Mobile Arena	44,530 / 44,530	$11,094,860
July 19, 2025	Paradise	United States	T-Mobile Arena	44,530 / 44,530	$11,094,860
July 22, 2025	San Francisco	United States	Chase Center	40,657 / 40,657	$10,424,203
July 24, 2025	San Francisco	United States	Chase Center	40,657 / 40,657	$10,424,203
July 26, 2025	San Francisco	United States	Chase Center	40,657 / 40,657	$10,424,203
July 28, 2025	Inglewood (Note: Labeled as Los Angeles in promotional material.)	United States	Kia Forum	54,809 / 54,809	$15,388,147
July 29, 2025	Inglewood	United States	Kia Forum	54,809 / 54,809	$15,388,147
August 1, 2025	Inglewood	United States	Kia Forum	54,809 / 54,809	$15,388,147
August 2, 2025	Inglewood	United States	Kia Forum	54,809 / 54,809	$15,388,147
August 6, 2025	Seattle	United States	Climate Pledge Arena	43,419 / 43,419	$11,240,782
August 7, 2025	Seattle	United States	Climate Pledge Arena	43,419 / 43,419	$11,240,782
August 9, 2025	Seattle	United States	Climate Pledge Arena	43,419 / 43,419	$11,240,782
August 22, 2025	New York City	United States	Madison Square Garden	81,585 / 81,585 (Note: The concerts in New York City on August 22 – September 7, 2025, had their data combined into a single boxscore.)	$27,108,989
August 23, 2025	New York City	United States	Madison Square Garden	81,585 / 81,585	$27,108,989
August 26, 2025	New York City	United States	Madison Square Garden	81,585 / 81,585	$27,108,989
August 27, 2025	New York City	United States	Madison Square Garden	81,585 / 81,585	$27,108,989
August 31, 2025	Miami	United States	Kaseya Center	27,038 / 27,038	$7,463,886
September 1, 2025	Miami	United States	Kaseya Center	27,038 / 27,038	$7,463,886
September 6, 2025	New York City	United States	Madison Square Garden		
September 7, 2025	New York City	United States	Madison Square Garden		
September 10, 2025	Toronto	Canada	Scotiabank Arena	43,175 / 43,175	$8,895,547
September 11, 2025	Toronto	Canada	Scotiabank Arena	43,175 / 43,175	$8,895,547
September 13, 2025	Toronto	Canada	Scotiabank Arena	43,175 / 43,175	$8,895,547
September 15, 2025	Chicago	United States	United Center	43,016 / 43,016	$11,772,225
September 17, 2025	Chicago	United States	United Center	43,016 / 43,016	$11,772,225
September 18, 2025	Chicago	United States	United Center	43,016 / 43,016	$11,772,225
September 29, 2025	London	England	The O_{2} Arena	63,629 / 63,629	$12,443,857
September 30, 2025	London	England	The O_{2} Arena	63,629 / 63,629	$12,443,857
October 2, 2025	London	England	The O_{2} Arena	63,629 / 63,629	$12,443,857
October 4, 2025	London	England	The O_{2} Arena	63,629 / 63,629	$12,443,857
October 7, 2025	Manchester	England	Co-op Live	31,657 / 31,657	$6,611,714
October 8, 2025	Manchester	England	Co-op Live	31,657 / 31,657	$6,611,714
October 12, 2025	Stockholm	Sweden	Avicii Arena	43,528 / 43,528	$7,282,982
October 13, 2025	Stockholm	Sweden	Avicii Arena	43,528 / 43,528	$7,282,982
October 15, 2025	Stockholm	Sweden	Avicii Arena	43,528 / 43,528	$7,282,982
October 19, 2025	Assago (Note: Labelled as Milan in promotional material.)	Italy	Unipol Forum	23,755 / 23,755	$4,262,890
October 20, 2025	Assago	Italy	Unipol Forum	23,755 / 23,755	$4,262,890
October 28, 2025	Barcelona	Spain	Palau Sant Jordi	54,181 / 54,181	$7,510,759
October 29, 2025	Barcelona	Spain	Palau Sant Jordi	54,181 / 54,181	$7,510,759
October 31, 2025	Barcelona	Spain	Palau Sant Jordi	54,181 / 54,181	$7,510,759
November 4, 2025	Berlin	Germany	Uber Arena	27,209 / 27,209	$5,060,570
November 5, 2025	Berlin	Germany	Uber Arena	27,209 / 27,209	$5,060,570
November 9, 2025	Amsterdam	Netherlands	Ziggo Dome	16,375 / 16,375	$3,219,043
November 11, 2025	Antwerp	Belgium	AFAS Dome	19,672 / 19,672	$3,312,843
November 13, 2025	Décines-Charpieu (Note: Labelled as Lyon in promotional material.)	France	LDLC Arena	26,324 / 26,324	$5,297,329
November 14, 2025	Décines-Charpieu	France	LDLC Arena	26,324 / 26,324	$5,297,329
November 17, 2025	Paris	France	Accor Arena	61,815 / 61,815	$10,556,309
November 18, 2025	Paris	France	Accor Arena	61,815 / 61,815	$10,556,309
November 20, 2025	Paris	France	Accor Arena	61,815 / 61,815	$10,556,309
November 22, 2025	Paris	France	Accor Arena	61,815 / 61,815	$10,556,309
December 5, 2025	Melbourne	Australia	Marvel Stadium	125,941 / 125,941	$24,009,941
December 6, 2025	Melbourne	Australia	Marvel Stadium	125,941 / 125,941	$24,009,941
December 9, 2025	Brisbane	Australia	Suncorp Stadium	49,146 / 49,146	$10,248,316
December 12, 2025	Sydney	Australia	Accor Stadium	143,859 / 143,859	$27,477,195
December 13, 2025	Sydney	Australia	Accor Stadium	143,859 / 143,859	$27,477,195
January 21, 2026	Osaka	Japan	Kyocera Dome	72,118 / 72,118	$13,338,700
January 22, 2026	Osaka	Japan	Kyocera Dome	72,118 / 72,118	$13,338,700
January 25, 2026	Tokyo	Japan	Tokyo Dome	184,855 / 184,855	$31,028,582
January 26, 2026	Tokyo	Japan	Tokyo Dome	184,855 / 184,855	$31,028,582
January 29, 2026	Tokyo	Japan	Tokyo Dome	184,855 / 184,855	$31,028,582
January 30, 2026	Tokyo	Japan	Tokyo Dome	184,855 / 184,855	$31,028,582
February 14, 2026	Glendale	United States	Desert Diamond Arena	26,926 / 26,926	$7,143,305
February 15, 2026	Glendale	United States	Desert Diamond Arena	26,926 / 26,926	$7,143,305
February 18, 2026	Inglewood	United States	Kia Forum	53,847 / 53,847	$14,261,550
February 19, 2026	Inglewood	United States	Kia Forum	53,847 / 53,847	$14,261,550
February 22, 2026	Inglewood	United States	Kia Forum	53,847 / 53,847	$14,261,550
February 23, 2026	Inglewood	United States	Kia Forum	53,847 / 53,847	$14,261,550
February 28, 2026	Fort Worth	United States	Dickies Arena	23,004 / 23,004	$7,218,862
March 1, 2026	Fort Worth	United States	Dickies Arena	23,004 / 23,004	$7,218,862
March 4, 2026	Atlanta	United States	State Farm Arena	23,250 / 23,250	$6,754,244
March 5, 2026	Atlanta	United States	State Farm Arena	23,250 / 23,250	$6,754,244
March 8, 2026	Austin	United States	Moody Center	24,158 / 24,158	$7,021,682
March 9, 2026	Austin	United States	Moody Center	24,158 / 24,158	$7,021,682
March 13, 2026 (Note: The concert in Miami on March 13, 2026, was originally planned for September 3, 2025, but it was rescheduled due to vocal strain.)	Miami	United States	Kaseya Center	13,630 / 13,630	$3,773,173
March 19, 2026	New York City	United States	Madison Square Garden	27,324 / 27,324 (Note: The concerts in New York City on March 19 – April 13, 2026, had their data combined into a single boxscore.)	$13,460,442
March 20, 2026	New York City	United States	Madison Square Garden	27,324 / 27,324	$13,460,442
March 23, 2026	Washington, D.C.	United States	Capital One Arena	27,158 / 27,158	$7,600,601
March 24, 2026	Washington, D.C.	United States	Capital One Arena	27,158 / 27,158	$7,600,601
March 29, 2026	Boston	United States	TD Garden	26,579 / 26,579	$7,779,425
March 30, 2026	Boston	United States	TD Garden	26,579 / 26,579	$7,779,425
April 2, 2026	Montreal	Canada	Centre Bell	28,946 / 28,946	$5,638,788
April 3, 2026	Montreal	Canada	Centre Bell	28,946 / 28,946	$5,638,788
April 9, 2026	Saint Paul	United States	Grand Casino Arena	29,910 / 29,910	$7,028,954
April 10, 2026	Saint Paul	United States	Grand Casino Arena	29,910 / 29,910	$7,028,954
April 13, 2026	New York City	United States	Madison Square Garden		
Total				1,627,075 / 1,627,075 (100%)	$362,994,471

=== Canceled concerts ===
List of canceled concerts
Date	City	Country	Venue	Reason	Ref.
April 6, 2026	Montreal	Canada	Bell Centre	Upper respiratory infection	

== See also ==
- List of highest-grossing concert tours by women
- List of Billboard Boxscore number-one concert series of the 2020s
