= Todo Mundo no Rio =

Free international music megashow

- Genre: Various
- Frequency: Annually
- Locations: Copacabana, Rio de Janeiro
- Countries: Brazil
- Years active: 2024–present
- Founder: Eduardo Paes
- Attendance: 5.7 million
- Organiser: Bonus Track Entretenimento
- Sponsors: Corona; Santander; LATAM; Zé Delivery; Guaraná Antarctica; Beats; C&A; TRESemmé; 99; Eventim; Deezer
- Website: todomundonorio.com

Todo Mundo no Rio (English: Everyone in Rio) is a series of international music megashows promoted by the City of Rio de Janeiro. The project aims to transform Copacabana Beach into a stage for major international music attractions, as well as to establish May as a month of cultural celebration in the city. Since its inaugural edition in 2024, the event has brought together world-renowned artists and is scheduled to be held annually until 2028.

== History ==
The project was founded in 2024 by Eduardo Paes, then Rio de Janeiro's mayor. It gained prominence after Madonna's inaugural show in May of that year, which attracted an audience of 1.6 million people – the largest in the singer's career, according to data from Riotur. Additionally, the event generated approximately R$300 million for the local economy. Inspired by the success of this performance, Paes expressed his desire to institutionalize the experience by hosting a new show every year until 2028, when his term was expected to end. Subsequently, Lady Gaga's participation was confirmed as the event's next headliner.

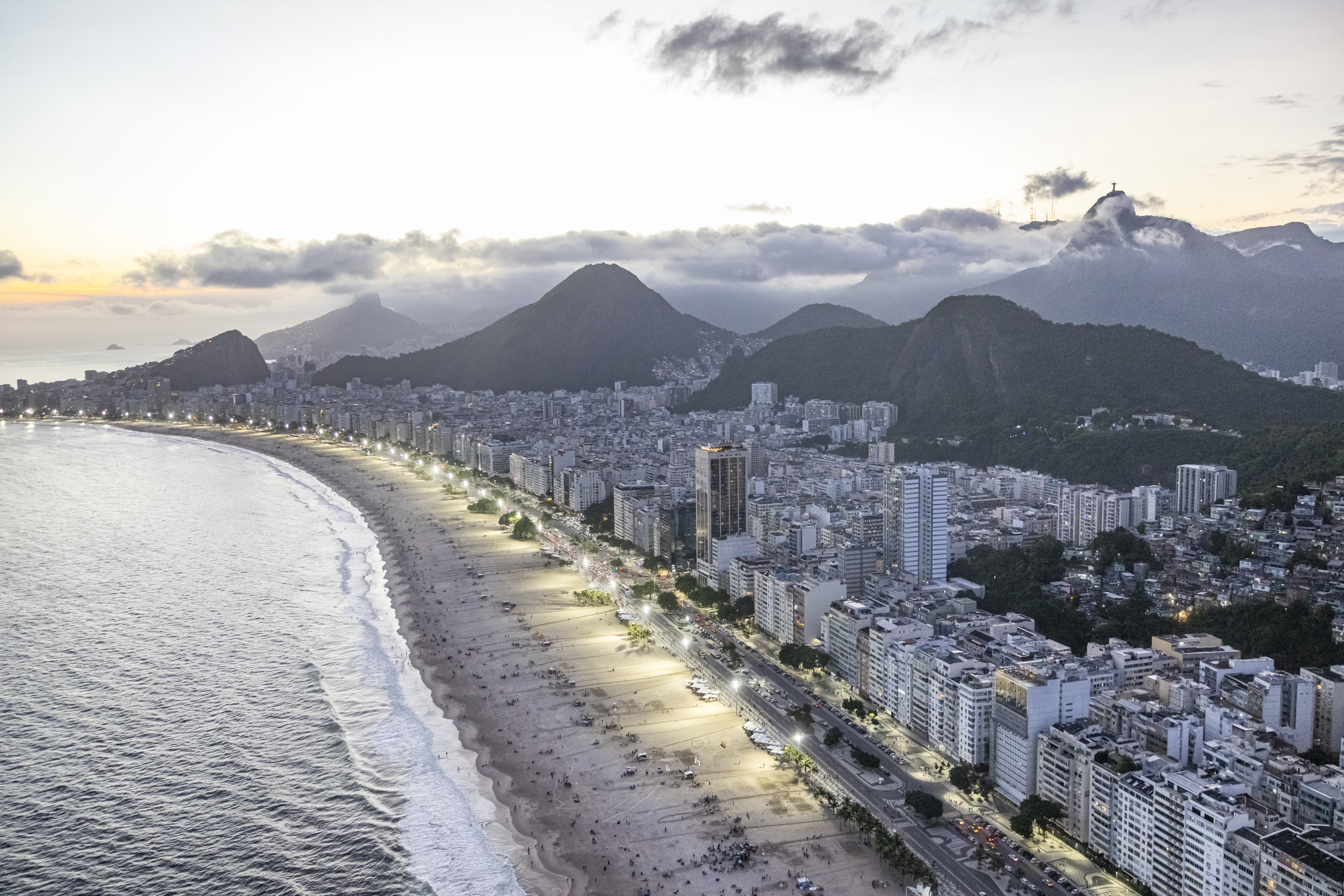
Aerial view of Copacabana Beach

In the following year, Gaga's performance on 3 May drew a record audience of 2.1 million people, (Note: Promoter Live Nation and Gaga's representatives estimated an audience of 2.5 million, while local authorities reported 2.1 million.) surpassing the previous mark set by Madonna. This made it the biggest show of Gaga's career, exceeding all her previous concerts in terms of attendance. Moreover, it was the largest solo artist concert of the 21st century and also set the record for the largest audience at a solo concert by a woman in music history. The economic impact was estimated at around R$600 million (US$109 million) for the city.

On 11 February 2026, Shakira was officially confirmed as the headlining artist for the third edition of the event, scheduled for May 2. During preparations for the show, part of the stage structure collapsed on the afternoon of April 26. The accident killed a worker, who was identified as 28-year-old Gabriel de Jesus Firmino. According to officials, the professional suffered severe crushing injuries to his lower limbs while involved in a lifting system during the stage assembly. A public statement by Shakira followed, in which she said she was "devastated" by the news and expressed condolences.

On 21 March 2026, Rio mayor Eduardo Cavaliere permanently banned artist Chappell Roan from performing at the event following a controversy involving the alleged mistreatment towards the stepdaughter of Jorginho by Roan's security guard. The event was later disproven by both Roan's team and the security guard himself, Pascal Duvier. Cavaliere did not provide another statement after the situation was publicly resolved.

== Operation ==
The event is held free of charge and is funded by both the City Hall of Rio de Janeiro and private sponsors. The megashow's format is designed to offer the public a high-quality cultural experience, gathering major international music stars in an atmosphere of integration and celebration. The project also intends to turn the first Saturday of May into an iconic date – initially dubbed "Celebration May".

== Broadcast and coverage ==
To broaden access to the event, the shows are broadcast live. For instance, Madonna and Lady Gaga's performances have been confirmed to be simultaneously broadcast by TV Globo, Multishow, and Globoplay. This strategy ensures that even those who are unable to attend Copacabana Beach in person can follow the show and participate in the celebration.

== Economic impact and outlook ==
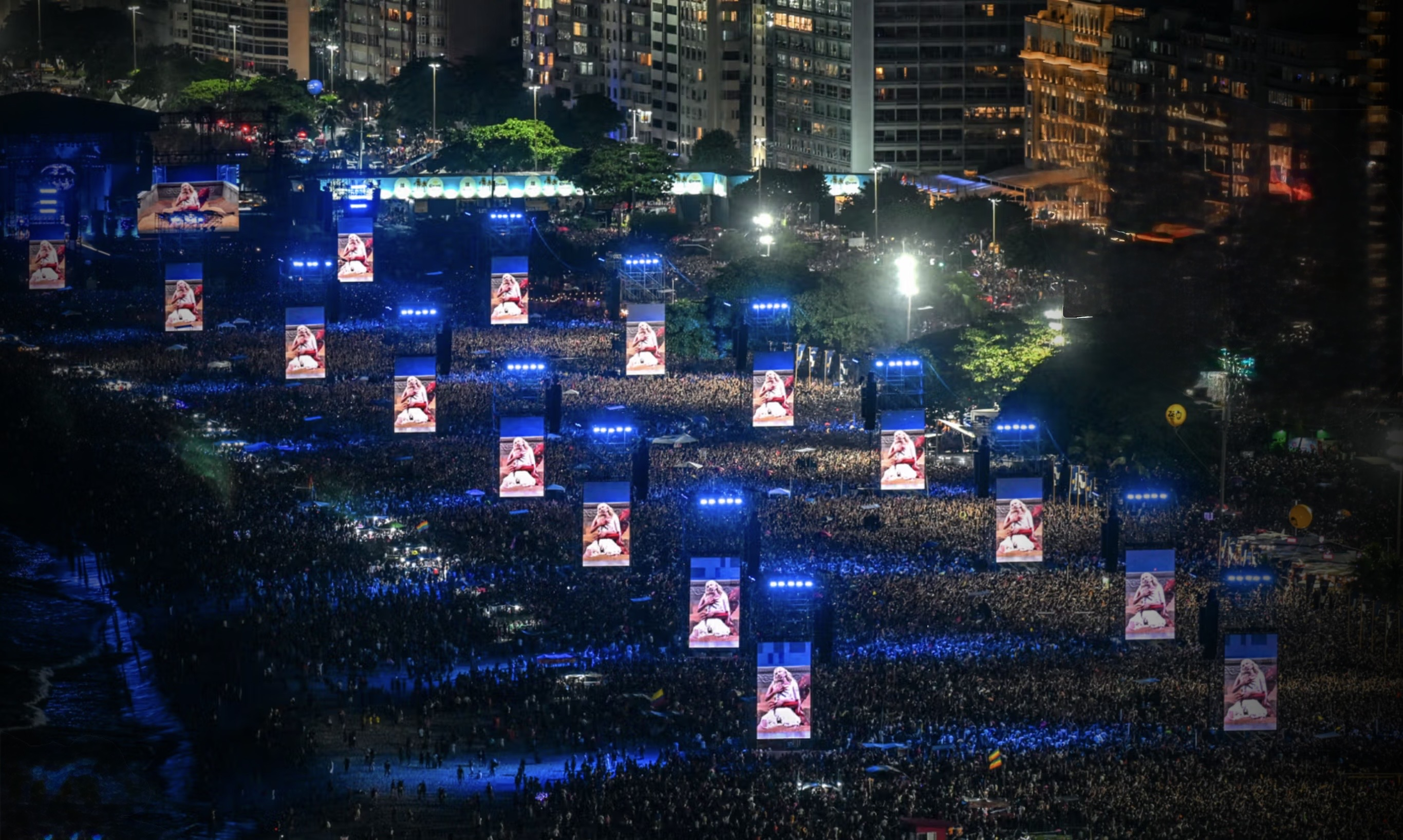
Aerial view of the crowd during Lady Gaga's concert in 2025

The success of Madonna's show, which generated an economic impact of around R$300 million, provided a strong argument for continuing the project. In an interview with the PodK Liberados podcast, Mayor Eduardo Paes stated:

"Are you going to spend public money on Lady Gaga? I will. I spent on Madonna too. Do you know why? Because it fills all the hotels, fills all the restaurants."

These positive results reinforce the expectation that the megashows will not only promote culture but also boost the local economy, benefiting sectors such as hospitality and dining. It is expected that the positive results of the project will encourage the continuation and strengthening of this series of events, attracting new partnerships and sponsors for future editions. Moreover, the Todo Mundo no Rio project reinforces the image of Rio de Janeiro as a global city capable of hosting large-scale cultural events with international appeal.

== Program and show history ==
The table below presents the history of the shows held.

Artist	Date	Part of	Supporting acts	Guests	Attendance	Ref.
Madonna	4 May 2024	The Celebration Tour	Diplo; Barata	Anitta; Pabllo Vittar	1.6 million	
Set list Act I: 1. "It's a Celebration" (Bob the Drag Queen introduction; includes elements of "Lucky Star", "Celebration", "Material Girl", "Vogue", "Express Yourself", and "Bitch I'm Madonna"); 2. "Nothing Really Matters"; 3. "Everybody" (With elements of "Where's the Party"); 4. "Into the Groove" (With elements of "Into the Hollywood Groove"); 5. "Burning Up"; 6. "Open Your Heart" (With elements of "Live to Tell"); 7. "Holiday" (With elements of "I Want Your Love"); 8. "Live to Tell"; 9. "Like a Prayer" (Includes elements of "Girl Gone Wild", "Act of Contrition", "Unholy" and "Let's Go Crazy"); Act II: 11. "Blond Ambition Interlude" (Includes elements of "Living for Love", "Fever", "Erotica" and "Justify My Love"); 12. "Erotica" (With elements of "Final Demo 2" and "Papa Don't Preach"); 13. "Justify My Love" (Includes elements of "Gangsta"); 14. "Fever" (snippet); 15. "Hung Up" (Includes elements of "Hung Up on Tokischa"); 16. "Bad Girl"; 17. "Ballroom Interlude" (Includes elements of "Up Down Suite", "Break My Soul (The Queens Remix)" and "Vogue"); 18. "Vogue" (with Anitta); 19. "Human Nature"; 20. "Crazy for You"; Act III: 21. "The Beast Within" (Interlude); 22. "Die Another Day"; 23. "Don't Tell Me" (Includes elements of "The Good, the Bad and the Ugly"); 24. "This Little Light of Mine" (Harry Dixon Loes song); 25. "Express Yourself"; 26. "La Isla Bonita"; 27. "Music" (with Pabllo Vittar); Act IV: 29. "Bedtime Story"; 30. "Ray of Light" (Sasha Ultra Violet mix); 31. "Rain"; Act V: 33. "Bitch I'm Madonna" (With elements of "Give Me All Your Luvin'" and "Unapologetic Bitch"); 34. "Celebration" (Outro; contains elements of "Celebration" (Benny Benassi remix) and "Music")						
Lady Gaga	3 May 2025	Mayhem on the Beach	Cat Dealers; Pabllo Vittar; Duda Beat	—N/a	2.1 million	
Set list Act I: Of Velvet and Vice: 1. "Bloody Mary"; 2. "Abracadabra"; 3. "Judas"; 4. "Scheiße"; 5. "Garden of Eden"; 6. "Poker Face" (followed by an interlude of "Abracadabra (Gesaffelstein remix)"); Act II: And She Fell into a Gothic Dream: 7. "Perfect Celebrity"; 8. "Disease"; 9. "Paparazzi"; 10. "Alejandro"; 11. "The Beast"; Act III: The Beautiful Nightmare That Knows Her Name: 12. "Killah"; 13. "Zombieboy"; 14. "Die with a Smile"; 15. "How Bad Do U Want Me"; Act IV: To Wake Her Is to Lose Her: 16. "Shadow of a Man" (with "Kill for Love" outro); 17. "Born This Way"; 18. "Blade of Grass"; 19. "Shallow"; 20. "Vanish into You"; Finale: Eternal Aria of the Monster Heart: 21. "Bad Romance"						
Shakira	2 May 2026	Las Mujeres Ya No Lloran World Tour	Vintage Culture; DJ Maz	Anitta; Caetano Veloso; Maria Bethânia; Ivete Sangalo	2 million	
Set list: 1. "Eu Te Amo Brasil" (Intro) (contains elements of "La Huesera" and "Caloris"); 2. "La Fuerte"; 3. "Girl Like Me"; 4. "Las de la Intuición"; 5. "Estoy Aquí"; 6. "Empire"; 7. "Inevitable"; 8. "Te Felicito"; 9. "TQG"; 10. "Don't Bother"; 11. "Acróstico"; 12. "Copa Vacía"; 13. "La Bicicleta"; 14. "La Tortura"; 15. "Hips Don't Lie"; 16. "Chantaje"; 17. "Monotonía"; 18. "Loca"; 19. "Soltera"; 20. "Choka Choka" (with Anitta); 21. "Can't Remember to Forget You"; 22. "Ojos Así"; 23. "Pies Descalzos, Sueños Blancos"; 24. "Antología"; 25. "O Leãozinho" (with Caetano Veloso); 26. "O Que É, O Que É?" (with Maria Bethânia); 27. "Objection (Tango)"; 28. "País Tropical" (with Ivete Sangalo); 29. "Whenever, Wherever"; 30. "Waka Waka (This Time for Africa)"; 31. "She Wolf"; 32. "Shakira: Bzrp Music Sessions, Vol. 53"						

== See also ==
- Operation Fake Monster, foiled bomb plot targeting the 2025 concert
